= 1914 College Football All-Southern Team =

American all-star college football team

The 1914 College Football All-Southern Team consists of American football players selected to the College Football All-Southern Teams selected by various organizations for the 1914 Southern Intercollegiate Athletic Association football season.

Tennessee and Auburn both had claims to the SIAA championship. It was Tennessee's first championship of any kind. Washington and Lee and Virginia both had claims to the SAIAA championship. Ted Shultz of Washington & Lee was selected an All-American by the Philadelphia Public Ledger.

== Composite eleven ==
The composite All-SIAA eleven compiled from a total of seven sports writers, coaches, and others by Zora Clevenger, University of Tennessee athletic director:

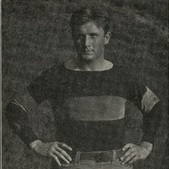
Farmer Kelly of Tennessee.

- Goat Carroll, end for Tennessee. Carroll scored all the points in the 16 to 14 victory over Vanderbilt, the school's first over its rival. An account of the first touchdown reads "Four minutes of play had barely drifted by when Tennessee's weird, mystic, elusive forward pass, May to Carroll, deadly in accuracy, went sailing home for the first touchdown of the game. The chesty Tennessee quarterback sent the oval whizzing for a distance of thirty-five yards and Carroll gathered in the ball near his goal line, when he hurried beneath the posts with all the speed at his command."
- Rabbit Curry, quarterback for Vanderbilt, included on Outing magazine's "FOOTBALL ROLL OF HONOR: The Men Whom the Best Coaches of the Country Have Named as the Stars of the Gridiron in 1914.". During the First World War, he was killed in aerial combat over France. He was a beloved player of Coach Dan McGugin, described by one writer as "the player who has most appealed to the imagination, admiration, and affection of the entire university community through the years."
- Bull Kearley, end for Auburn, last year moved to this position from halfback. Donahue's 7-Box or 7-2-2 defensive scheme required fast ends which could disrupt a play from the start. This was role was filled by Kearley. He recovered three fumbles in the game with Georgia Tech in 1914, a 14 to 0 victory. "Bull Kearley was the star on both sides and gave an exhibition of football the like of which has never been seen on a southern gridiron before. He covered every punt and nearly every time nailed the man in his tracks, once coming down the field so hard that the man, receiving the punt, fumbled it to get out of the way."
- Mush Kerr, guard for Tennessee. One account of the Sewanee game reads "Mush Kerr played a wonderful game in the line as did Capt. Kelly. The work of the Tennessee line was easily the feature of the contest, and Sewanee early discovered that it was practically useless to rely on line plunges to gain ground."
- Farmer Kelly, tackle and captain for Tennessee, included on Outing magazine's "FOOTBALL ROLL OF HONOR."
- Hunter Kimball, halfback for Mississippi A&M. In 1932, he was appointed the first Executive Director of the Mississippi Game and Fish Commission.
- Rus Lindsay, fullback for Tennessee. In the Sewanee game: "Lindsay, as usual, ploughed through the opposing line for consistent gains, and when it was absolutely necessary that Tennessee gain a certain number of yards 'Russ' was sure to be called upon."
- David Paddock, quarterback for Georgia, the school's second All-American. He was named such by Parke H. Davis. Paddock is the only player in school history to have a petition circulated by the student body requesting that he play for the Bulldogs. Included on Outing magazine's "FOOTBALL ROLL OF HONOR."
- Boozer Pitts, center for Auburn, the lone unanimous selection. One writer claims "Auburn had a lot of great football teams, but there may not have been one greater than the 1913-1914 team." Included on Outing magazine's "FOOTBALL ROLL OF HONOR." Pitts later coached and was once professor of mathematics at Auburn.
- Big Thigpen, guard for Auburn. The Atlanta Constitution praised his "smashing brilliant game in the line."
- Bully Van de Graaff, tackle for Alabama. He was selected for the Associated Press Southeast Area All-Time football team 1869-1919 era. The brother of the inventor of the Van de Graaff generator which produces high voltages.

== Composite overview ==
The composite All-SIAA overview. Boozer Pitts was the only unanimous selection.

Name	Position	School	First-team selections
Boozer Pitts	Center	Auburn	7
Goat Carroll	End/Fullback	Tennessee	6
Farmer Kelly	Tackle	Tennessee	5
Bully Van de Graaff	Tackle/End	Alabama	5
Big Thigpen	Guard	Auburn	5
David Paddock	Quarterback	Georgia	5
Hunter Kimball	Tackle	Mississippi A&M	5
Bull Kearley	End	Auburn	4
Mush Kerr	Guard	Tennessee	4
Rabbit Curry	Quarterback/Halfback	Vanderbilt	4
Ammie Sikes	Halfback/Fullback	Vanderbilt	4
Baby Taylor	Guard/Tackle	Auburn	3
Lee Tolley	Quarterback/Halfback	Sewanee	3
Rus Lindsay	Fullback	Tennessee	3
Jim Senter	End	Georgia Tech	2
Robbie Robinson	End	Auburn	2
Bob Taylor Dobbins	Tackle	Sewanee	2
Jimmie Hicks	Guard	Alabama	2
Red Harris	Fullback	Auburn	2
Josh Cody	Tackle	Vanderbilt	1
Shorty Schilletter	Tackle	Clemson	1
Kirby Lee Spurlock	Tackle	Mississippi A&M	1
J. S. Patton	Halfback	Georgia Tech	1

== All-Southerns of 1914 ==
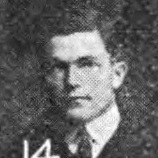
Bull Kearley of Auburn.

=== Ends ===
- Alonzo "Goat" Carroll, Tennessee (ZC, C, EG, DVG, UT-1, WGF)
- Bull Kearley, Auburn (ZC, C, IB, DJ, HC, H)
- Jim Senter, Georgia Tech (ZC, C, IB, H)
- Robbie Robinson, Auburn (ZC, C, EG, DVG, UT-2, WGF)
- Bob Winston, North Carolina (DJ)
- Big Parker, Sewanee (HC, UT-2)
- Jim MacDougal, North Carolina A & M (WL)
- Roy Homewood, North Carolina (WL)

=== Tackles ===
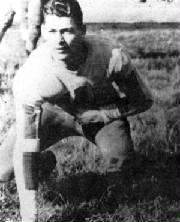
Bully Van de Graaff of Alabama.

- Farmer Kelly, Tennessee (ZC, C, IB, DJ, H, UT-1)
- Bully Van de Graaff, Alabama (ZC, C, HC, EG, H, DVG, UT-1 [as e], WGF)
- Bob Taylor Dobbins, Sewanee (ZC, C, IB, HC, UT-2 [as g], WGF)
- Shorty Schilletter, Clemson (ZC, C, UT-2)
- Ted Shultz, Washington & Lee (DJ, WL)
- Josh Cody, Vanderbilt (College Football Hall of Fame) (ZC, DVG, UT-1)
- Rube Barker, Virginia (DJ)
- Pete Mailhes, Tulane (EG)
- A. B. Stoney, South Carolina (WL)
- Lou Louisell, Auburn (UT-2)

=== Guards ===
- Big Thigpen, Auburn (ZC, C, HC, EG, H, DVG, UT-1, WGF)
- Mush Kerr, Tennessee (ZC, C, IB, HC, UT-1, WGF)
- Baby Taylor, Auburn (ZC, C, DJ, EG, H)
- Jimmie Hicks, Alabama (ZC, C, IB, DVG)
- Kirby Lee Spurlock, Mississippi A&M (ZC, C, DJ)
- Harris Coleman, Virginia (WL)
- S. D. Bayer, Tennessee (UT-2)

=== Centers ===
- Boozer Pitts†, Auburn (ZC, C, IB, HC, EG, H, DVG, UT-1, WGF)
- Yank Tandy, North Carolina (DJ, WL-as guard)
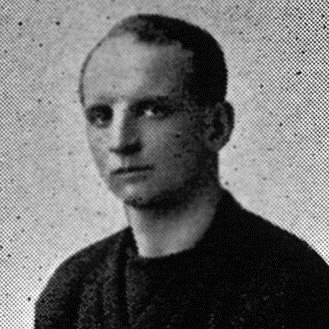
  David Paddock of Georgia.
- John Petritz, Georgetown (WL)
- Evan McLean, Tennessee (UT-2)

=== Quarterbacks ===
- David Paddock, Georgia (ZC, C, IB, EG, H, UT-1)
- Lee Tolley, Sewanee (ZC, HC, UT-1 [as hb], WGF)
- Robert Kent Gooch, Virginia (DJ, WL)
- Bill May, Tennessee (UT-2)

=== Halfbacks ===
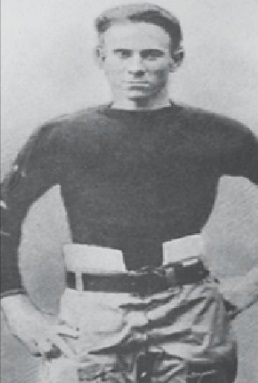
Rabbit Curry of Vanderbilt.

- Hunter Kimball, Mississippi A&M (ZC, C, IB, DJ, HC, WL [as fb], H, UT-2)
- Rabbit Curry, Vanderbilt (ZC, C, HC, WL, UT-1)
- Ammie Sikes, Vanderbilt (ZC, C, IB, EG, H, WGF)
- Buck Mayer, Virginia (DJ [as fb], WL)
- J. S. Patton, Georgia Tech (ZC, WGF)
- Harry Young, Washington & Lee (College Football Hall of Fame) (DJ)
- Garrett George, Tulane (EG)
- M. B. "Jimmy" James, Clemson (UT-2)

=== Fullbacks ===
- Rus Lindsay, Tennessee (ZC, C, IB, HC, H. UT-1, WGF)
- Red Harris, Auburn, (ZC, C, UT-2)
- Bedie Bidez, Auburn (EG)

== Key ==
Bold = Composite selection

† = Unanimous selection

ZC = received votes a composite All-SIAA compiled from a total of seven sports writers, coaches, and others by Zora Clevenger, University of Tennessee athletic director. The seven were coaches Clevenger and Pontius of Tennessee, Innis Brown, John Heisman, Dick Jemison, Innis Brown, Jack Nye, W. G. Foster, and Bill Streit.

C = received selections in a composite of five selectors: Atlanta Constitution, the Atlanta Journal, the Birmingham Ledger, the Birmingham Age-Herald, and the Atlanta Sunday American.

IB = selected by Innis Brown, sporting editor for the Atlanta Journal.

DJ = selected by Dick Jemison, sporting editor for the Atlanta Constitution. He also had an All-SIAA team, used in the above composite.

HC = selected by Harris G. Cope, coach at University of the South.

EG = selected by Ewing Gillis of the New Orleans Item.

WL = selected by W. A. Lambeth, professor at the University of Virginia, "from the opinion of local observers and critics"

H = selected by John Heisman, published in Fuzzy Woodruff's A History of Southern Football 1890-1928.

DVG = selected by D. V. Graves, coach at the University of Alabama.

UT = selected by coach Clevenger and "Butch" Pontius of the University of Tennessee.

WGF = selected by W. G. Foster of the Chattanooga Times.

== See also ==
- 1914 College Football All-America Team
