= History of Auburn Tigers football =

The Auburn Tigers football team represents Auburn University in American football.

== Overview ==
=== Early history (1892–1950) ===
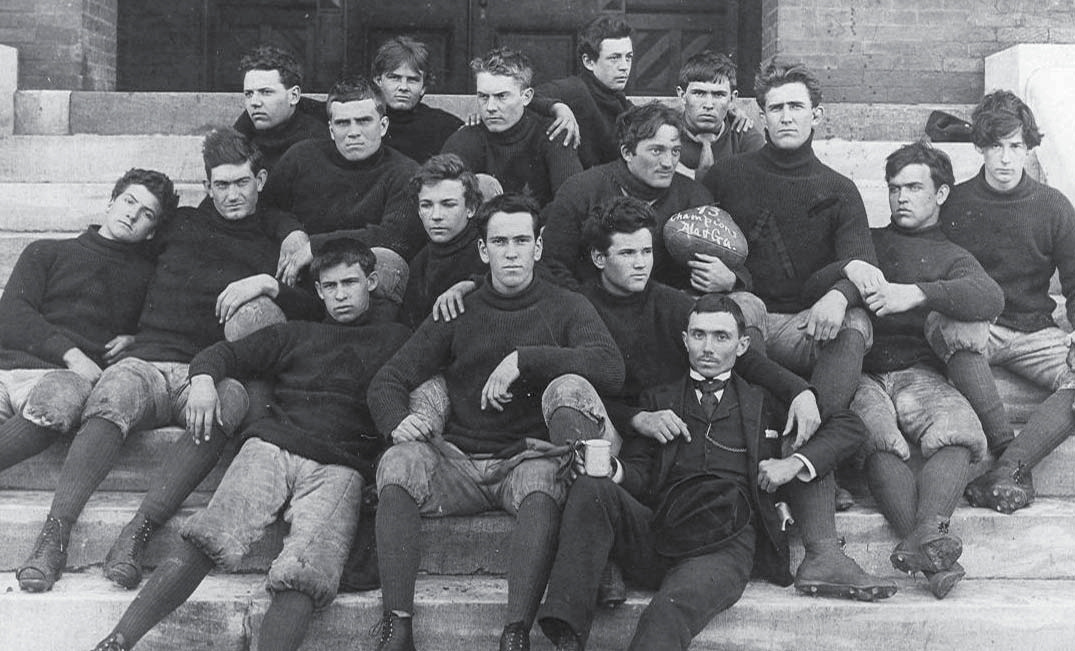
The team in 1893.

Auburn was led by nine different coaches over a 12-year span. The organization of Auburn's first football team is credited to George Petrie, who led the 1892 Tigers to a 2–2 record. Petrie also chose burnt orange and navy blue as the official colors for Auburn athletic teams, which was inspired by his alma mater, the University of Virginia. The first game was against the University of Georgia at Piedmont Park in Atlanta, Georgia. Auburn won, 10–0, in front of a crowd of 2,000, in a game that would establish the Deep South's Oldest Rivalry. Auburn and Alabama played their first football game in Lakeview Park in Birmingham, Alabama, on February 22, 1893. Head coach D. M. Balliet led Auburn to a 32–22 victory, before an estimated crowd of 5,000. It is the first recorded, intercollegiate football game in the state of Alabama. Alabama considered the game to be the final matchup of the 1892 season and Auburn recorded it as the first of 1893. G. H. Harvey coached the four games that Auburn played the following fall. The 1894 team was led by head coach Forrest M. Hall, in his first and only year as head coach of the Tigers. The team finished with a record of one win and three losses (1–3). While the team had a losing record, the squad has the distinction of achieving the largest win in Auburn history, defeating Georgia Tech 94–0.

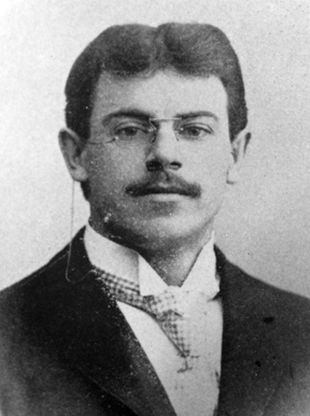
Heisman at Auburn.

The most prominent coach of this early period is John Heisman, for whom the Heisman trophy is named. During five years, Heisman compiled a 12–4–2 record, before departing for Clemson in 1900. Auburn's very first conference membership came in 1895, when it joined the Southern Intercollegiate Athletic Association (SIAA). The 1895 team executed a "hidden ball trick" with quarterback Reynolds Tichenor in the game against Vanderbilt, as Auburn seemed to run a revolving wedge. Vanderbilt still won however, 9–6; the first time in the history of southern football that a field goal decided a game. (Note: The Tigers again used the play against Georgia. Georgia coach Pop Warner later used the trick in 1897 while at Cornell against Penn State; and again and most famously in 1903 while at Carlisle against Harvard, attracting national attention in a close loss.) Auburn suffered its only loss to Pop Warner's champion Bulldogs in 1896. (Note: Georgia's quarterback was Richard Von Albade Gammon. The next year, Tichenor transferred to Georgia and Gammon died on the field in a game against UVA.) Auburn received its first national publicity when Heisman was able to convince Harper's Weekly to publish the 1896 team's photo. The 1897 team finished $700 in debt, and Heisman was the actor, director, and producer of David Garrick to raise the money. As such, he is founder of Auburn's first theatrical group: The A.P.I. Dramatic Club. The 1898 team went 2–1 with its only loss to SIAA champion North Carolina. In Heisman's opinion, the 1899 team was his best while at Auburn. Captained by Arthur Feagin, the squad is remembered as the only team to score on the legendary Sewanee Tigers team that went undefeated and beat Texas, Texas A&M, Tulane, LSU and Ole Miss over a 6-day span. Auburn lost their matchup to the "Iron Men" by a single point. The first undefeated season came in 1900, when the Tigers went 4–0 under coach Billy Watkins.

The 1902 Tigers were coached by two men that year: Robert Kent and M. S. Harvey. A little over halfway through the season, Kent stepped down after going 2–2–1. Harvey followed and in his only season as head coach went 0–2. The season featured Auburn's first All-Southern selection: the massive, 230 pound guard James C. Elmer.

The 1903 team was coached by William Penn Bates in his only season as Auburn's head coach.

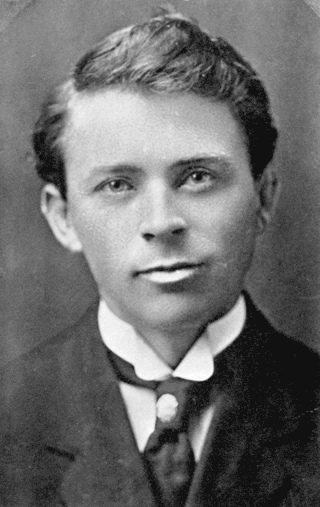
Coach Donahue.

Mike Donahue became the tenth head coach of the Auburn Tigers. Donahue's tenure at Auburn helped elevate the program to new heights, including the school's first national championship, three SIAA championships, and three undefeated seasons. In 1904, his first team finished with a 5–0 record and a share of the conference championship. Willis Kienholz coached the team temporarily. The 1907 season would mark the last time Auburn would play Alabama until 1948, after a 7–7 tie between the two rivals. The 1908 team was led by All-Southerns quarterback Tom McLure and halfback Lew Hardage. The Tigers lost to Hall of Famer Doc Fenton and undefeated LSU, but controversy surrounded LSU's season and Auburn also claimed a conference title. The 1910 team claimed a share of the conference championship with a 6–1 record, led by leading scorer and fullback Bradley Streit.

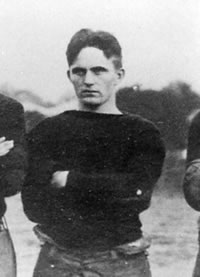
Kirk Newell.

Donahue's peak came in the 1913 and 1914 seasons, without a single team crossing Auburn's goal through the line. The 1913 team, led by captain Kirk Newell, (Note: Newell received the Distinguished Service Award for his service in the First World War. According to David Housel, while in France Newell laid on top of a hand grenade set to explode on a group of people he knew, taking the brunt of the explosion himself. Newell was severely wounded after the act of selflessness. 36 pieces of scrap iron were removed from his body.) claimed Auburn's first outright conference championship with an 8–0 record. (Note: The 1913 Tigers were also named national champions by Billingsley Report, which is Auburn's first national championship recognized in the NCAA records book.) The 1914 Tigers posted all shutouts and also won a conference championship with an 8–0–1 record. (Note: They were also named national champions by minor selector Howell Ratings.) Bull Kearley was a key feature of Donahue's 7–2–2 defense.

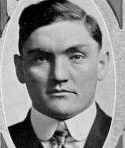
Baby Taylor.

The 1915 team went 6–2, losing to both southern champions (Vanderbilt and Georgia Tech). Guard Baby Taylor was a unanimous All-Southern selection and a third-team All-American selection by Walter Camp. The 1917 team was very strong, including Moon Ducote as a standout, but lost 60–7 to the South's first national champion: Heisman's Georgia Tech Golden Tornado.

The Tigers would return to the top of the conference once again in 1919 with an 8–1 record. Fatty Warren ran for a 40-yard gain in the 14–7 victory over Georgia Tech, the game which netted the SIAA championship and gave Tech its first loss to an SIAA school in five years, since Auburn in 1914. It was Heisman's last game at Georgia Tech. Zelda Sayre sent All-Southern tackle Pete Bonner a telegram after the win, it read:

"Shooting a seven, aren't we awfully proud of the boys, give them my love—knew we could." (Note: She signed it "Zelder Sayre.")

The 1920 team outscored its opponents by a margin of 332–49, a then-school record for points, but was held scoreless in its two losses to the conference co-champions (Georgia and Georgia Tech). Auburn moved to the Southern Conference (SoCon) in 1922. The 1922 team is considered one of Auburn's greatest football teams. (Note: It was considered Auburn's best by Ed Sherling, who Walter Camp gave honorable mention in 1922.) The Tigers upset defending Southern champion Centre. One year later, Donahue became the coach at LSU. Boozer Pitts was promoted from assistant coach to Auburn's head football coach, serving from 1923 to 1924 and again in 1927. Pitts failed to win more than four games in a single season during his tenure that included an 0–4–2 1927 season.

In September 1925, Dave Morey was hired as the head football coach. Morey was the head coach at Auburn for three years (1925–1927), compiling an overall record of 10–10–1 at the school. The highlight of Morey's tenure with Auburn was a 2–0 win over Bernie Bierman's Tulane squad in the game that dedicated New Orleans' famous Sugar Bowl. In 1927, the Auburn football team lost its starting quarterback, who was expelled after being caught sneaking into the women's dormitory following a night of drunken reverie. The team opened the 1927 season with an 0–3 record, including embarrassing losses to Stetson College and Clemson. At a pep rally six days after the loss to Clemson, Morey announced his resignation. George Bohler was Auburn's head football coach for two seasons from 1928 to 1929. He posted a 3–11 record in those two seasons before he was replaced due to the poor record and support. Chet A. Wynne was Auburn's head football coach for four seasons (1930–1933), posting a 22–15–2 record before departing to take the head football coach position at Kentucky. Wynne's 1932 team posted a 9–0–1 record and won the Southern Conference championship in its final year in the conference before moving to the SEC. Jimmy Hitchcock was consensus All-American. Jack Meagher came to Auburn from Rice. Auburn's first bowl appearance came in 1936 under Coach Meagher after a 7–2–2 season. The Tigers traveled to Havana, Cuba to play Villanova in the Bacardi Bowl, which ended in a 7–7 tie. Auburn's first bowl win came after the 1937 season against Michigan State in the Orange Bowl. Meagher's final record at Auburn in 48–37–10. Due to the events surrounding World War II, Auburn did not field a team in 1943, but resumed competition in 1944 under Carl Voyles. During Earl Brown's tenure, Auburn met Alabama for the first time since 1907, which ended with an Alabama victory. The Tigers quickly responded in 1949, as they stunned the heavily favored Crimson Tide in a 14–13 victory. An 0–10 season in 1950 called for a change, and marked the end of a trying era for Auburn football.

=== Ralph "Shug" Jordan era (1951–1975) ===
In 1951, Auburn hired Ralph "Shug" Jordan to become the new head coach of the Tigers. During his first season, Auburn finished with a 5–5 record. He led the Tigers to three consecutive bowl appearances in 1953, 1954, and 1955. Jordan is most recognized for his 1957 squad, which finished the season with a 10–0 record, and won Auburn's first SEC Championship. The Associated Press named the Auburn Tigers no. 1 in its postseason poll, marking the school's first consensus national championship in the modern era. The 1957 Auburn team was ineligible for Bowl participation due to NCAA Sanctions, having been placed on probation indefinitely. The 1958 team was also named national champions by minor selector Montgomery Ratings, after a 9–0–1 season. Auburn went on to appear in bowl games in 1963 and 1965. Beginning in 1968, the Tigers enjoyed seven consecutive bowl appearances under coach Jordan.

In 1970 James Owens, a fullback from Fairfield, Alabama, became Auburn's first African American football player. He played for three seasons. He was followed in 1971 by Thom Gossom. In 1971, Auburn quarterback Pat Sullivan led the Tigers to a 9–2 record, and became the school's first Heisman Trophy winner. Auburn would go on to lose the 1972 Sugar Bowl to Oklahoma, 40–22. One of Jordan's biggest victories came against Alabama in 1972, when the Tigers shocked the Crimson Tide in a 17–16 upset. The 1972 Iron Bowl became known as the "Punt Bama Punt" game, due to two blocked Alabama punts in the fourth quarter, which were both returned for Auburn touchdowns. In 1973, Auburn's Cliff–Hare Stadium was renamed Jordan–Hare Stadium, which was the first stadium in the nation to be named for an active coach. After the 1975 season, Jordan retired after a 25-year tenure at Auburn, with a 176–83–7 record and a .675 winning percentage. The 176 career wins remain a record for an Auburn coach.

=== Doug Barfield era (1976–1980) ===
Following Jordan's retirement, Auburn hired Doug Barfield to become the new head coach. From 1976 to 1980, Barfield's Tigers compiled a 27–27–1 on-field record, with no bowl appearances. He lost all five games to rival Alabama during his tenure, and was later awarded two victories due to forfeits by Mississippi State in 1976 and 1977, making his record 29–25–1. He was dismissed from his position after a disappointing season in 1980, as the Tigers finished with a 5–6 record. Auburn then hired Pat Dye, a former assistant coach at Alabama under Coach Paul W. Bryant, and head coach at Wyoming at the time. During his first season in 1981, Auburn finished with a 5–6 record.

=== Pat Dye era (1981–1992) ===
In 1982, Pat Dye led Auburn to a 9–3 record and its first bowl appearance in eight years. The 1982 season would also begin a streak of nine consecutive bowl game appearances. The highlight of the season came against Alabama in the Iron Bowl, when Auburn snapped the Tide's 9-game winning streak. The 1982 Iron Bowl is widely known as the "Bo Over the Top" game, for Auburn running back Bo Jackson's leap over the top of a pile from the one-yard line to secure a 23–22 victory over Alabama. This would be the final Iron Bowl for Alabama's legendary coach, Bear Bryant, who retired after the 1982 season and died on January 26, 1983.

Dye's best season came in 1983, when the Tigers went 11–1, claiming the conference championship. Auburn went on to defeat Michigan in the Sugar Bowl 9–7. Some felt that #3 Auburn should have been crowned the national champions, due to #5 Miami's upset of #1 Nebraska in the Orange Bowl, and #7 Georgia's upset of #2 Texas in the Cotton Bowl. Nonetheless, Miami jumped from No. 5 to No. 1 in both the AP and Coaches polls, while Auburn remained in the No. 3 spot behind #2 Nebraska. The 1983 team is recognized by the NCAA as Auburn's third national championship in school history, citing selectors such as the New York Times and Billingsley Report. In 1985, running back Bo Jackson would become the school's second Heisman Trophy winner. Auburn would go on to win three consecutive SEC championships in 1987, 1988, and 1989. In 1988, defensive tackle Tracy Rocker became the school's first Lombardi Award winner and also won the Outland Trophy. Pat Dye is credited for organizing the first ever Iron Bowl played in Auburn. On December 2, 1989, Bill Curry's #2 Crimson Tide (10–0) traveled to Jordan–Hare Stadium, which had surpassed the seating capacity of Legion Field, to face the #11 Auburn Tigers, who defeated the Tide, 30–20. The 1989 Iron Bowl would continue a 4-game winning streak over Alabama. Since 1981, Auburn is 18–17 in Iron Bowl games.

Dye's tenure on the plains ended when Auburn was penalized for payments by boosters and assistant coaches to a player, Eric Ramsey. Tape recordings were released that implicated a booster named "Corky" Frost, and former Troy University head coach Larry Blakeney. The controversy landed the Auburn program a spot on 60 Minutes and an eventual NCAA investigation. While the investigation did not find Dye personally responsible for rules violations, the NCAA determined that as head coach and athletic director, Dye should have known about and stopped the payments to Ramsey. The fallout from the NCAA probation against the football team pushed Dye out as athletic director in 1991, and as head coach the following year. Over 12 seasons, Dye achieved a 99–39–4 record, the third highest number of wins in Auburn football history, only behind Mike Donahue and Ralph "Shug" Jordan. In 2005, the playing surface of Jordan–Hare Stadium was named "Pat Dye Field" in honor of Dye's achievements and contributions he made to Auburn during his tenure.

=== Terry Bowden era (1993–1998) ===
Following the departure of Pat Dye, Auburn named Samford head coach Terry Bowden, son of legendary coach Bobby Bowden, head coach of the Tigers. In 1993, while serving a one-year television ban and two-year postseason bowl ban due to NCAA probation, Auburn shocked the nation by completing the season with a perfect 11–0 record. The Tigers were not eligible to play in the SEC Championship Game, nor a bowl game, but are recognized by the NCAA as national champions by National Championship Foundation ratings. The most memorable game of the 1994 season was the "Interception Game" versus LSU. In which the Auburn defense intercepted 7 LSU passes, returning 3 for touchdowns in the 4th quarter (Ken Alvis, Fred Smith and Brian Robinson). During the first two seasons under Bowden, the Tigers amassed a 20–1–1 record. After serving two years of probation, Auburn made three consecutive bowl game appearances from 1995 to 1997. Bowden's 1997 team won the SEC Western Division title, and played in the SEC Championship Game, falling to Tennessee, 30–29. In 1998, Bowden faced criticism for recruiting woes, off-the-field issues, and player discipline, which eventually led to his resignation after a 1–5 start on the season. Interim head coach Bill Oliver finished out the season, which ended with a 3–8 record. Bowden compiled a 47–17–1 record at Auburn after six seasons as head coach.

=== Tommy Tuberville era (1999–2008) ===
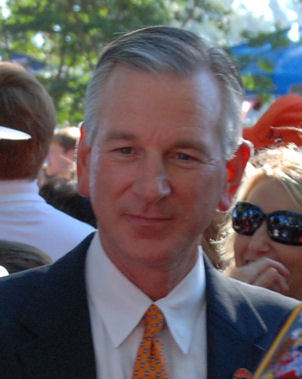
Coach Tuberville.

Following the 1998 season, Ole Miss head coach Tommy Tuberville left Oxford to become the new head coach of the Auburn Tigers. In his first season, the Tigers finished with a 5–6 record, but would return to the SEC Championship Game in 2000, following a 9–0 victory over Alabama, which was played in Tuscaloosa for the first time in 99 years. The Tigers fell to Florida, 28–6, but would begin a streak of eight consecutive bowl appearances. Auburn would win a share of the SEC Western Division title in 2001 and 2002. The high point of the 2002 season was Auburn's 17–7 upset victory over Alabama, which began a six-year winning streak over the Tide. Tuberville's 2004 team completed the season with a perfect 13–0 record and an SEC Championship. Auburn was left out of the BCS National Championship Game, due to two other undefeated teams ranked higher, #1 USC (12–0) and #2 Oklahoma (12–0). The Tigers went on to defeat Virginia Tech, 16–13, in the Sugar Bowl, completing Auburn's third perfect season in the modern era of college football. USC defeated Oklahoma, 55–19, to win the national championship; however, they were later stripped of their title due to improper recruiting practices. Auburn finished the season ranked No. 2 in the final AP and Coaches polls. The Tigers were recognized as national champions by various polling organizations, including FansPoll and Golf Digest. Tuberville came under much criticism during the 2008 season for his lackluster performance and coaching staff, including offensive coordinator Tony Franklin, whom he fired after a shocking 14–13 loss to Vanderbilt in October. At that time, the team was 4–2. Auburn finished the year with a 5–7 record, after a disappointing 36–0 loss to rival Alabama in the Iron Bowl, marking the Tide's first victory over Auburn in Tuscaloosa and snapping Auburn's six-year winning streak. Tuberville voluntarily resigned the following week, stating that he would take a year off from coaching. Over ten seasons, Tuberville compiled an 85–40 record at Auburn, while winning one conference championship, five division championships, and completing Auburn's sixth perfect season in school history.

=== Gene Chizik era (2009–2012) ===
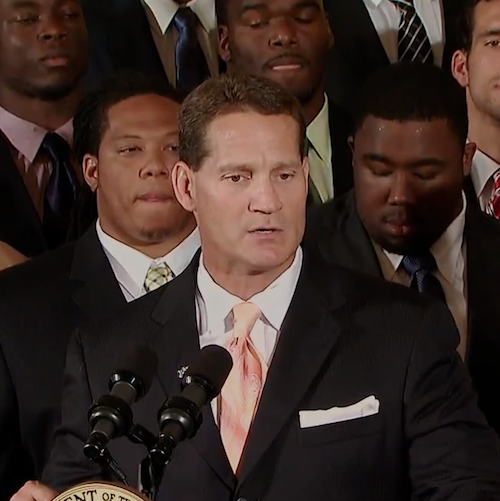
Coach Chizik.

On December 13, 2008, athletic director Jay Jacobs announced Gene Chizik, former Auburn defensive coordinator and then Iowa State head coach, as the new Auburn head coach. He received early criticism for his 5–19 record during his time at Iowa State during 2007 and 2008. He quickly began forming his new coaching staff, including offensive coordinator Gus Malzahn, who had coached the nation's top offense at Tulsa for the previous two seasons. During his first season, Auburn finished with a 7–5 record, and defeated Northwestern 38–35 in the Outback Bowl, its first bowl game since 2007.

Following the 2009 season, Chizik and his staff recruited a top-5 recruiting class, highlighted by junior college transfer quarterback Cam Newton and running back Mike Dyer. Auburn's 2010 "A-Day" spring scrimmage drew a crowd of 63,217 fans to Jordan–Hare Stadium, setting a new spring game attendance record. Auburn, led by quarterback Cam Newton, running back Michael Dyer, and defensive tackle Nick Fairley, completed the regular season with a perfect 12–0 record, highlighted by a comeback victory over Alabama. The Tide led Auburn 24–0 in the first half, only to lose the game in the second half, 28–27. It was the largest lead ever blown by Alabama in Tuscaloosa and the largest ever comeback through the 75-year history of the game. Auburn went on to defeat South Carolina 56–17 in the SEC Championship Game, which secured a spot in the BCS National Championship Game. This would be the first BCS bowl game appearance for Auburn since 2004, when the Tigers were left out of the national championship picture. Cam Newton became the third Heisman Trophy winner in school history, while also winning the AP Player of the Year Award, the Walter Camp Award, the Davey O'Brien Award, the Manning Award, and the Maxwell Award. Nick Fairley became the second Auburn player in school history to win the Lombardi Award. Auburn faced the Oregon Ducks on January 10, 2011, in Glendale, Arizona, which ended with a 22–19 Auburn victory, secured by a game-winning field goal kick by senior Wes Byrum, who also kicked the game-winning field goals against Clemson and Kentucky during the regular season. Auburn finished the season with a perfect 14–0 record, and its first consensus national championship since 1957. Auburn celebrated their national championship with a special ceremony at Jordan–Hare Stadium two weeks following the championship game in Arizona. The coaches and players were honored, along with players from the 1957, 1993, and 2004 undefeated teams. The event drew over 78,000 fans, covering Jordan–Hare Stadium lower decks, spilling into both upper decks. A special "reverse" Tiger Walk and special rolling of Toomer's Corner also took place. After settling down from the magical 2010 season, Chizik and his staff began preparing to defend their national title.

Auburn opened the 2011 season with dramatic wins against Utah State and Mississippi State. Auburn then fell to eventual ACC Champion Clemson on the road in Death Valley, which snapped Auburn's 17-game winning streak, which began on January 1, 2010, vs. Northwestern in Outback Bowl. The Tigers would go on to complete the regular season with a 7–5 record and ranked no. 25 in the final BCS poll, with wins against Florida Atlantic, no. 9 South Carolina, Florida, Ole Miss, and Samford. Auburn fell to Arkansas, LSU (SEC Champions), Georgia (eastern division champion), and arch-rival Alabama (National Champions). The Tigers won their 37th bowl appearance by a score of 43–24 over the Virginia Cavaliers in the 2011 Chick-fil-A Bowl on December 31, 2011. This would be Gus Malzahn's final game as offensive coordinator for Auburn before becoming head coach at Arkansas State. Defensive coordinator Ted Roof would also depart following the 2011 season, leaving for UCF.

Following a 3–9 (0–8 in conference play) season in 2012, the program's worst season in 60 years, Chizik was terminated as head football coach. In addition to the remarkably poor 2012 season, mounting player disciplinary issues and the lack of on-field success delivered from several consecutive highly rated recruiting classes contributed to Chizik's firing. Over his four-season tenure as head coach at Auburn, Chizik compiled an overall record of 33–19 (15–17 in conference play), delivering one SEC Championship and a national championship in 2010 and three consecutive bowl wins from 2009 to 2011 before not qualifying for a bowl in 2012.

=== Gus Malzahn era (2013–2020) ===
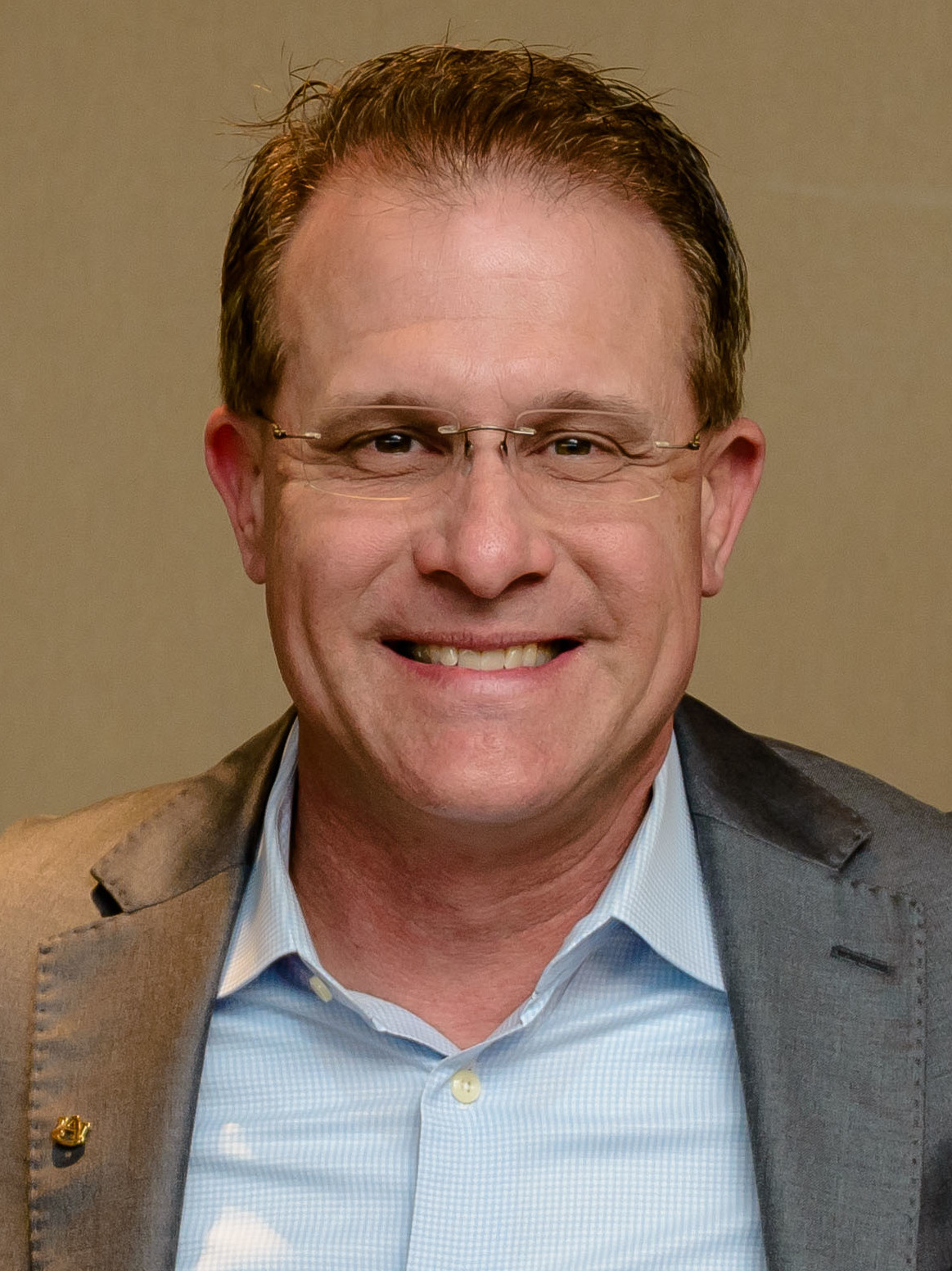
Coach Malzahn

After Gene Chizik's termination at the end of the 2012 season, athletic director Jay Jacobs formed a search committee headed by former Auburn Heisman Trophy winners Bo Jackson and Pat Sullivan along with fellow former player Mac Crawford to find the program's next head coach. The committee unanimously selected Arkansas State head coach and former Auburn offensive coordinator from 2009 to 2011 Gus Malzahn. On December 4, 2012, it was officially announced that Malzahn would assume the position of head coach at Auburn University. He is currently in his third season, and his 2013 Tigers went 12–2 and won the SEC Championship versus the Missouri Tigers. The season was highlighted by two of the greatest plays in Auburn football history. After allowing number 25 Georgia to take a 38–37 lead with less than two minutes remaining, quarterback Nick Marshall threw a 73-yard Hail Mary pass to Ricardo Louis for the game-winning touchdown after being tipped up by two Georgia defenders. The Tigers put the game away in the final 25 seconds and won 43–38 over the Bulldogs. Auburn also defeated number 1 Alabama in dramatic fashion. After lobbying for one second to be restored to the game clock in the fourth quarter, tied 28–28 with the Tigers, Alabama head coach Nick Saban chose to attempt a 57-yard game-winning field goal. The Tide was 0–3 in field goal attempts on the day with veteran kicker Cade Foster, thus chose to use Adam Griffith for the final attempt. Griffith's kick did not have the distance and the ball landed in the hands of Chris Davis, who returned the ball unofficially 109 yards end zone to end zone for an Auburn touchdown and sealed a victory for the Tigers along with a berth in the SEC Championship Game. Auburn would face number 5 Missouri in the 2013 SEC Championship Game, eventually winning 59–42 in an offensive showdown which produced 677 total yards for Auburn, including a 304-yard performance by game MVP Tre Mason. The Tigers faced number 1 Florida State in the 2014 BCS National Championship Game in Pasadena, California, on January 6, 2014. They lost by a score of 34–31, as Florida State scored the go-ahead touchdown with 13 seconds remaining in the game, ending the SEC streak of winning BCS national championships at seven. They were only the second SEC team to lose in a BCS championship game, and the only SEC team to do so against non-SEC competition. The Tigers finished number 2 in both the final AP and Coaches polls. Since the end of the 2013 season Malzahn's Auburn Tigers have compiled a record of 27–13 and 13–11 in SEC play. Auburn finished 8–5 in 2014, including a 34–31 loss to Wisconsin in the 2014 Outback Bowl. Before the 2015 season, Auburn was ranked number six and was supposed to be in the mix for the College Football Playoff but, after an almost upset by FCS Jacksonville State and an embarrassing loss at thirteen ranked LSU at the beginning of the season, those dreams were gone. Auburn compiled a 6–6 record, 2–6 in the SEC and a trip to the Birmingham Bowl to face Memphis. Auburn defeated Memphis 31–10 in front of a crowd of 59,430, to end its season with a 7–6 record. This season was considered the worst since the 2012 season when Auburn went 3-9 and 0–8 in SEC play.

In the 2016 season, Auburn had the fourth-toughest schedule in the country. Despite the schedule and various team injuries, Malzahn managed to lead the Tigers to a New Year's Six Sugar Bowl appearance against Oklahoma. Kamryn Pettway led the SEC and ranked 11th in the nation in rushing yards per game, which made him a Doak Walker Award semifinalist (top running back in college football). Seven players were selected to the 2016 All-SEC football team. In 2017, Malzahn led the Tigers to the SEC Championship game by defeating #1 ranked Georgia and #1 ranked Alabama over the span of three weeks. In a rematch with the Georgia Bulldogs, Auburn lost the 2017 SEC Championship Game 28–7. They went on to play UCF in the NY6 Peach Bowl where they would lose 34–27. Kerryon Johnson earned the 2017 SEC Offensive Player of the Year award and seven players selected to the 2017 All-SEC football team. Immediately after the season, Malzahn agreed to a seven-year, $49 million contract extension with Auburn. In the 2018 season, Malzahn led the Tigers to a 7–5 regular season record. The team defeated Purdue 63–14 in the Music City Bowl to cap off the season. In the 2019 season, Malzahn led the Tigers to a 9–3 regular season record. The season was highlighted by ranked victories over Oregon, Texas A&M, and Alabama. The Tigers fell to Minnesota in the Outback Bowl.

On December 13, 2020, Malzahn was fired as Auburn head coach at the conclusion of his eighth winning season. He finished with a 68–35 record, including 39–27 in the SEC. Auburn committed to buy out the remainder of his contract, for $21.45 million. Malzahn's buyout is the largest buy out of a fired coach in the history of college football. Malzahn reached fifth on Auburn's all-time wins list, behind only Shug Jordan, Mike Donahue, Pat Dye and Tommy Tuberville. During his time at Auburn he coached 12 All-America Team players. Malzahn had a total of 36 players selected in the NFL Draft under him, averaging 4.6 draft picks per year. The third-most in history by an Auburn coach. He has produced three NFL Draft classes of at least five players drafted and in 2019, 2020 they had back-to-back years of six players drafted. A feat none of the last three previous Auburn coaches ever did once. Malzahn wasn't out of coaching long, however. On February 15, 2021, UCF hired Malzahn as their new head coach.

=== Bryan Harsin era (2021–2022) ===
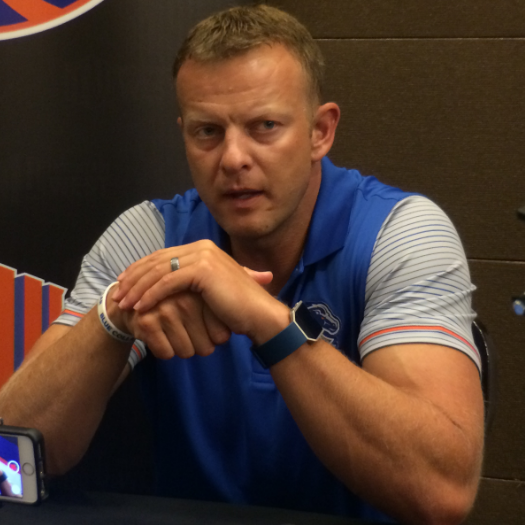
Coach Harsin

On December 22, 2020, Boise State head coach Bryan Harsin was announced as the 27th head coach of the Auburn Tigers, taking over after the termination of Gus Malzahn. His annual salary was $5.25 million. Interestingly, Harsin had also replaced Gus Malzahn as head coach at Arkansas State after Malzahn took the Auburn head coaching job. Harsin was a bit of a curious hire for Auburn, as he had never coached at a school east of the Mississippi River and, aside from a two-year stint as offensive coordinator at Texas and one year as head coach at Arkansas State, had no ties to the southern United States.

In Harsin's first season with the Tigers, the Tigers went 6–7, the team's worst record since 2012. Despite the losing record, the season saw ranked victories over Arkansas and Ole Miss to go along with a narrow 24–22 4OT loss to #3 Alabama. Following the season, Harsin fired offensive coordinator Mike Bobo and hired former Seattle Seahawks quarterback coach, Austin Davis, to replace Bobo before losing Davis just six weeks later for personal reasons. Harsin also lost defensive coordinator Derek Mason to Oklahoma State where Mason took the same role for less money. In addition to the coordinatoring changeovers, twenty players left the program including starting quarterback Bo Nix who described his time under Harsin as "miserable".

Following the loss of players and coaches, as well as rumors that began circulating in February 2022, Auburn began to collect information to understand any issues surrounding the football program. Harsin told ESPN that "I'm not planning on going anywhere". Multiple players, current and former, came out both in support of and in opposition to Harsin. In the end, Auburn decided to retain Harsin as head coach. Harsin would later, in July 2022, describe the situation this way: "There was an inquiry. It was uncomfortable. It was unfounded. It presented an opportunity for people to personally attack me, my family and also our program. And it didn't work." Harsin was fired as Auburn's head coach on Monday, October 31, 2022, following a 3–5 start to the season. He finished with a 9–12 record and recorded the lowest win percentage by an Auburn head coach since Earl Brown (1948–1950). Running backs coach Carnell Williams finished the 2022 season as interim head coach.

=== Hugh Freeze era (2023–2025) ===
After Harsin's firing, Auburn initially pursued Ole Miss head coach Lane Kiffin but Kiffin chose to stay with the Rebels and signed a contract extension. To fill its head coaching vacancy, Auburn ultimately turned to a former Ole Miss head coach. On November 28, 2022, Liberty head coach Hugh Freeze was announced as the next Auburn head coach. Freeze achieved success at Ole Miss, leading the Rebels to a 10–3 record and a victory in the 2016 Sugar Bowl before a personal scandal forced his resignation on July 20, 2017. Freeze signed a six-year contract with Auburn worth $6.5 million annually excluding incentives. His contract also allows for several more million dollars in bonus money for team performance incentives.

=== Alex Golesh era (2026-present) ===
After Hugh Freeze's disappointing 3-season stint at Auburn, the Tigers chose to go in a new direction. Four weeks after terminating the contract with Freeze, on November 30, 2025, Auburn hired South Florida's Alex Golesh as the new head coach. He signed a six-year contract, $44.4 million contract and became Auburn's fourth head football coach in just seven seasons. At USF he went 23-15 over three seasons, include 9-3 in 2025, and his offense ranked fourth nationally in scoring. Golesh also has experience in the SEC, having worked as the offensive coordinator at Tennessee. At his introductory press conference Golesh promised an up-tempo, physical offense, saying "We're going to be explosive on offense." Defensive coordinator Coach D. J. Durkin was retained as defensive coordinator for continuity from the previous coaching staff.
