= 1914 Southern Intercollegiate Athletic Association football season =

- League: NCAA
- Sport: College football
- Duration: September 26, 1914 through December 5, 1914
- Teams: 19

Regular Season
- Season champions: Tennessee; Auburn

Football seasons
- ← 1913 1915 →

1914 Southern Intercollegiate Athletic Association football standings
	Conf.					Overall
Team	W		L		T	W		L		T
Tennessee +	6	–	0	–	0	9	–	0	–	0
Auburn +	4	–	0	–	1	8	–	0	–	1
Texas A&M	2	–	0	–	0	6	–	1	–	1
Ole Miss	2	–	1	–	1	5	–	4	–	1
Mississippi A&M	4	–	2	–	0	6	–	2	–	0
Sewanee	4	–	2	–	0	5	–	3	–	0
Florida	3	–	2	–	0	5	–	2	–	0
Georgia	2	–	2	–	1	3	–	5	–	1
Clemson	2	–	2	–	0	5	–	3	–	1
Alabama	3	–	3	–	0	5	–	4	–	0
Kentucky	1	–	1	–	0	5	–	3	–	0
LSU	1	–	2	–	1	4	–	4	–	1
Chattanooga	1	–	3	–	0	5	–	4	–	0
Vanderbilt	1	–	3	–	0	2	–	6	–	0
Mississippi College	0	–	1	–	1	4	–	3	–	1
Wofford	0	–	1	–	0	1	–	7	–	1
Central University	0	–	1	–	0	1	–	3	–	1
Mercer	0	–	3	–	0	5	–	4	–	0
Tulane	0	–	3	–	1	3	–	3	–	1
The Citadel	0	–	3	–	0	2	–	5	–	0
+ – Conference co-champions

The 1914 Southern Intercollegiate Athletic Association football season was the college football games played by the member schools of the Southern Intercollegiate Athletic Association as part of the 1914 college football season. The season began on September 26.

Tennessee and Auburn both claim conference championships. It was the first championship of any kind for the Tennessee program. Vanderbilt no longer dominated the South by 1914.

== Regular season ==
Index to colors and formatting
Non-conference matchup; SIAA member won
Non-conference matchup; SIAA member lost
Non-conference matchup; tie
Conference matchup

SIAA teams in bold.

=== Week One ===
Date	Visiting team	Home team	Site	Result	Attendance	Reference
September 26	Marion	**Auburn**	Drake Field • Auburn, AL	**W** 39–0		
September 26	North Georgia	**Georgia**	Sanford Field • Athens, GA	**W** 81–0		
September 26	Wilmington (OH)	**Kentucky**	Stoll Field • Lexington, KY	**W** 87–0		
September 26	Carson–Newman	**Tennessee**	Waite Field • Knoxville, TN	**W** 89–0		
September 26	Southwestern Louisiana Industrial	**LSU**	State Field • Baton Rouge, LA	**W** 54–0		
September 26	**Chattanooga**	Rhea County High School	Dayton, TN	**W** 7–6		
September 28	Gordon	**Mercer**	Central City Park • Macon, GA	**W** 44–0		

=== Week Two ===
Date	Visiting team	Home team	Site	Result	Attendance	Reference
October 2	Mississippi State Normal	**Mississippi College**	Clinton, MS	**W** 40–0		
October 2	Austin	**Texas A&M**	Kyle Field • College Station, TX	**W** 32–0		
October 3	Howard (AL)	**Alabama**	The Quad • Tuscaloosa, AL	**W** 13–0		
October 3	Fourth District Agricultural School	**Auburn**	Drake Field • Auburn, AL	**W** 60–0		
October 3	Kentucky Military Institute	**Central University**	Cheek Field • Danville, KY	**W** 18–6		
October 3	**Clemson**	Davidson	Sprunt Athletic Field • Davidson, NC	**T** 0–0		
October 3	**The Citadel**	**Georgia**	Sanford Field • Athens, GA	**UGA** 12–0		
October 3	Maryville (TN)	**Kentucky**	Stoll Field • Lexington, KY	**W** 80–0		
October 3	Louisiana Industrial	**LSU**	State Field • Baton Rouge, LA	**W** 60–0		
October 3	Marion	**Mississippi A&M**	New Athletic Field • Starkville, MS	**W** 54–0		
October 3	Cumberland (TN)	**Sewanee**	Hardee Field • Sewanee, TN	**W** 59–0		
October 3	King (TN)	**Tennessee**	Waite Field • Knoxville, TN	**W** 55–3		
October 3	Henderson-Brown	**Vanderbilt**	Dudley Field • Nashville, TN	**W** 42–6		
October 3	Riverside Military Academy	**Wofford**	Spartanburg, SC	**T** 0–0		
October 3	**Chattanooga**	**Mercer**	Central City Park • Macon, GA	**CHAT** 16–0		
October 5	Jonesboro Aggies	**Ole Miss**	Oxford, MS	**W** 20–0		

=== Week Three ===
Date	Visiting team	Home team	Site	Result	Attendance	Reference
October 9	Trinity (TX)	**Texas A&M**	Kyle Field • College Station, TX	**T** 40–0		
October 9	Maryville (TN)	**Chattanooga**	Chamberlain Field • Chattanooga, TN	**W** 37–7		
October 10	Birmingham	**Alabama**	The Quad • Tuscaloosa, AL	**W** 54–0		
October 10	**Auburn**	**Florida**	Barrs Field • Jacksonville, FL	**AUB** 20–0		
October 10	Porter Military Academy	**The Citadel**	College Park Stadium • Charleston, SC	**W** 12–0		
October 10	**Georgia**	**Sewanee**	Hardee Field • Sewanee, TN	**UGA** 7–6		
October 10	**Mercer**	Georgia Tech	Grant Field • Atlanta, GA	**L** 0–105		
October 10	**Mississippi College**	**LSU**	State Field • Baton Rouge, LA	**LSU** 14–0		
October 10	Southwestern Presbyterian	**Ole Miss**	Oxford, MS	**W** 14–0		
October 10	Cumberland (TN)	**Mississippi A&M**	New Athletic Field • Starkville, MS	**W** 77–0		
October 10	**Vanderbilt**	Michigan	Ferry Field • Ann Arbor, MI	**L** 3–23	5,282	
October 10	**Wofford**	Furman	Greenville, SC	**L** 12–19		

=== Week Four ===
Date	Visiting team	Home team	Site	Result	Attendance	Reference
October 16	TCU	**Texas A&M**	Kyle Field • College Station, TX	**W** 40–0		
October 17	Georgia Tech	**Alabama**	Rickwood Field • Birmingham, AL	**W** 13–0		
October 17	**Clemson**	**Auburn**	Drake Field • Auburn, AL	**AUB** 28–0		
October 17	King (TN)	**Florida**	University Field • Gainesville, FL	**W** 36–0		
October 17	**Mississippi A&M**	**Kentucky**	Stoll Field • Lexington, KY	**UK** 19–13		
October 17	**Ole Miss**	**LSU**	State Field • Baton Rouge, LA	**MISS** 21–0		
October 17	North Carolina	**Georgia**	Grant Field • Atlanta, GA	**L** 6–41		
October 17	**Chattanooga**	**Sewanee**	Hardee Field • Sewanee, TN	**SEW** 46–3		
October 17	**Tennessee**	Louisville	Eclipse Park • Louisville, KY	**W** 66–0		
October 17	Southwestern Louisiana Industrial	**Tulane**	Tulane Stadium • New Orleans, LA	**W** 33–0		
October 17	**Central University**	**Vanderbilt**	Dudley Field • Nashville, TN	**VAN** 59–0		
October 17	Davidson	**Wofford**	Spartanburg, SC	**L** 6–86		
October 17	Jefferson (LA)	**Mississippi College**	Clinton, MS	**W** 25–0		

=== Week Five ===
Date	Visiting team	Home team	Site	Result	Attendance	Reference
October 21	King (TN)	**Mercer**	Central City Park • Macon, GA	**W** 27–7		
October 22	**Clemson**	Furman	Greenville, SC	**W** 57–0		
October 23	Haskell	**Texas A&M**	Morris Park • Fort Worth, TX	**L** 0–6	3,000	
October 24	**Mississippi A&M**	**Auburn**	Rickwood Field • Birmingham, AL	**AUB** 19–0		
October 24	**The Citadel**	Davidson	Wearn Field • Charlotte, NC	**L** 0–16		
October 24	**Georgia**	Virginia	Lambeth Field • Charlottesville, VA	**L** 0–28		
October 24	Earlham	**Kentucky**	Stoll Field • Lexington, KY	**W** 81–3		
October 24	Jefferson (LA)	**LSU**	State Field • Baton Rouge, LA	**W** 14–13		
October 24	**Sewanee**	**Florida**	Barrs Field • Jacksonville, FL	**SEW** 26–0		
October 24	Centenary	**Tulane**	Tulane Stadium • New Orleans, LA	**W** 82–0		
October 24	**Alabama**	**Tennessee**	Waite Field • Knoxville, TN	**TENN** 17–7		
October 24	North Carolina	**Vanderbilt**	Dudley Field • Nashville, TN	**L** 9–10		
October 24	Presbyterian	**Wofford**	Spartanburg, SC	**W** 7–0		
October 24	Howard (AL)	**Chattanooga**	Chamberlain Field • Chattanooga, TN	**W** 14–0		
October 24	**Mercer**	Georgia Military College	Milledgeville, GA	**W** 26–0		

=== Week Six ===
Date	Visiting team	Home team	Site	Result	Attendance	Reference
October 26	**Ole Miss**	**Mississippi College**	Mississippi State Fairgrounds • Jackson, MS	**T** 7–7		
October 27	Jefferson College (LA)	**Tulane**	Tulane Stadium • New Orleans, LA	**W** 24–7		
October 28	**Wofford**	Newberry	State Fairgrounds • Columbia, SC	**L** 0–36		
October 29	**Clemson**	South Carolina	State Fairgrounds • Columbia, SC	**W** 29–6		
October 31	**Clemson**	**The Citadel**	College Park Stadium • Charleston, SC	**CLEM** 14–0		
October 31	**Tulane**	**Alabama**	The Quad • Tuscaloosa, AL	**ALA** 58–0		
October 31	Southern College	**Florida**	Plant Field • Tampa, FL	**W** 59–0		
October 31	**Sewanee**	Georgia Tech	Grant Field • Atlanta, GA	**L** 0–20		
October 31	**Mississippi A&M**	**Georgia**	Sanford Field • Athens, GA	**MSA&M** 9–0		
October 31	**Kentucky**	Cincinnati	Carson Field • Cincinnati, OH	**L** 7–14		
October 31	**LSU**	**Texas A&M**	Fair Park • Dallas, TX	**TXA&M** 63–9		
October 31	**Ole Miss**	Ouachita Baptist	Red Elm Park • Memphis, TN	**L** 0–7		
October 31	**Chattanooga**	**Tennessee**	Waite Field • Knoxville, TN	**TENN** 67–0		
October 31	Virginia	**Vanderbilt**	Dudley Field • Nashville, TN	**L** 7–20		
October 31	Louisiana Industrial	**Mississippi College**	Mississippi State Fairgrounds • Jackson, MS	**W** 38–8		
October 31	Furman	**Mercer**	Macon, GA	**MER** 38–8		

=== Week Seven ===
Date	Visiting team	Home team	Site	Result	Attendance	Reference
November 4	South Carolina	**Wofford**	Spartanburg Fairgrounds • Spartanburg, SC	**L** 0–25		
November 7	**Auburn**	Georgia Tech	Grant Field • Atlanta, GA	**W** 14–0		
November 7	Kentucky Wesleyan	**Central University**	Cheek Field • Danville, KY	**T** 6–6		
November 7	Newberry	**The Citadel**	College Park Stadium • Charleston, SC	**W** 14–13		
November 7	**Clemson**	**Georgia**	Sanford Field • Athens, GA	**CLEM** 35–13		
November 7	**Wofford**	**Florida**	University Field • Gainesville, FL	**FLA** 66–0		
November 7	**Kentucky**	Purdue	Stuart Field • West Lafayette, IN	**L** 6–40		
November 7	Arkansas	**LSU**	Fair Grounds Field • Shreveport, LA	**L** 12–20		
November 7	**Mercer**	**Mississippi A&M**	New Athletic Field • Starkville, MS	**MSA&M** 73–0		
November 7	**Ole Miss**	**Tulane**	Tulane Stadium • New Orleans, LA	**MISS** 21–6		
November 7	Christian Brothers	**Mississippi College**	Memphis, TN	**L** 0–62		
November 7	**Chattanooga**	Transylvania	Thomas Field • Lexington, KY	**L** 7–26		
November 8	**Tennessee**	**Vanderbilt**	Dudley Field • Nashville, TN	**TENN** 16–14		
November 9	**Texas A&M**	Rice	Rice Field • Houston, TX	**W** 32–7		

=== Week Eight ===
Date	Visiting team	Home team	Site	Result	Attendance	Reference
November 13	**Chattanooga**	**Alabama**	The Quad • Tuscaloosa, AL	**ALA** 63–0		
November 13	Ouachita Baptist	**Mississippi College**	Clinton, MS	**L** 0–19		
November 14	**Vanderbilt**	**Auburn**	Rickwood Field • Birmingham, AL	**AUB** 6–0	10,000	
November 14	**Clemson**	VMI	Broad Street Park • Richmond, VA	**W** 27–23		
November 14	**The Citadel**	**Florida**	University Field • Gainesville, FL	**FLA** 7–0		
November 14	**Georgia**	Georgia Tech	Grant Field • Atlanta, GA	**L** 0–7		
November 14	Louisville	**Kentucky**	Stoll Field • Lexington, KY	**W** 42–0		
November 14	Haskell	**LSU**	Pelican Park • New Orleans, LA	**L** 0–31		
November 14	**Ole Miss**	Arkansas	Kavanaugh Field • Little Rock, AR	**W** 13–7		
November 14	**Tulane**	**Mississippi A&M**	Mississippi State Fairgrounds • Jackson, MS	**MSA&M** 61–0		
November 14	**Sewanee**	**Tennessee**	Andrews Field • Chattanooga, TN	**TENN** 14–7		
November 14	**Mercer**	Stetson	Jacksonville, FL	**W** 45–0		

=== Week Nine ===
Date	Visiting team	Home team	Site	Result	Attendance	Reference
November 17	**Ole Miss**	Texas	Clark Field • Austin, TX	**L** 7–66		
November 17	Oklahoma A&M	**Texas A&M**	Kyle Field • College Station, TX	**W** 24–0		
November 20	**Ole Miss**	Southwestern (TX)	Georgetown, TX	**L** 0–18		
November 20	**Central University**	Georgetown (KY)	Hinton Field • Georgetown, KY	**L** 0–66		
November 21	**Auburn**	**Georgia**	Grant Field • Atlanta, GA	**T** 0–0		

=== Week Ten ===
Date	Visiting team	Home team	Site	Result	Attendance	Reference
November 26	**Sewanee**	**Vanderbilt**	Dudley Field • Nashville, TN	**SEW** 14–13		
November 26	**The Citadel**	South Carolina	Davis Field • Columbia, SC	**L** 6–7		
November 26	**Central University**	Transylvania	Thomas Field • Lexington, KY	**L** 3–53		
November 26	**Clemson**	Georgia Tech	Grant Field • Atlanta, GA	**L** 6–26		
November 26	**Mercer**	**Florida**	University Field • Gainesville, FL	**FLA** 14–0		
November 26	**Kentucky**	**Tennessee**	Waite Field • Knoxville, TN	**TENN** 23–6		
November 26	**Ole Miss**	**Texas A&M**	Baseball Park • Beaumont, TX	**TXA&M** 14–7	500	
November 26	**Mississippi A&M**	**Alabama**	Rickwood Field • Birmingham, AL	**MSA&M** 9–0		
November 26	**LSU**	**Tulane**	Tulane Stadium • New Orleans, LA	**T** 0–0		
November 26	Howard (AL)	**Mississippi College**	Mississippi State Fairgrounds • Jackson, MS	**W** 27–6		
November 26	Cumberland (TN)	**Chattanooga**	Chamberlain Field • Chattanooga, TN	**W** 61–7		
November 28	Newberry	**Wofford**	Spartanburg, SC	**L** 7–15		

=== Week Eleven ===
Date	Visiting team	Home team	Site	Result	Attendance	Reference
December 2	Carlisle	**Alabama**	Rickwood Field • Birmingham, AL	**L** 3–20		
December 5	Carlisle	**Auburn**	Grant Field • Atlanta, GA	**W** 7–0		
December 5	**Wofford**	Wake Forest	Wake Forest, NC	**L** 0–41		

== Awards and honors ==
=== All-Americans ===
- QB - David Paddock, Georgia (PHD)

=== All-Southern team ===
The composite All-Southern team compiled from a total of seven sports writers, coaches, and others by Zora Clevenger, University of Tennessee athletic director included:

Position	Name	First-team selectors	Team
QB	David Paddock	ZC, C	Georgia
HB	Hunter Kimball	ZC, C	Mississippi A&M
HB	Rabbit Curry	ZC, C	Vanderbilt
FB	Rus Lindsay	ZC, C	Tennessee
E	Alonzo Carroll	ZC, C	Tennessee
T	Farmer Kelly	ZC, C	Tennessee
G	Big Thigpen	ZC, C	Auburn
C	Boozer Pitts	ZC, C	Auburn
G	Mush Kerr	ZC, C	Tennessee
T	Bully Van de Graaff	ZC, C	Alabama
E	Bull Kearley	ZC, C	Auburn
