= 1913 College Football All-Southern Team =

American all-star college football team

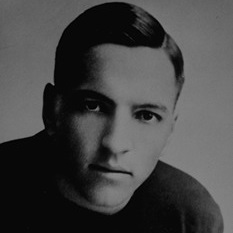
Bob McWhorter

The 1913 College Football All-Southern Team consists of American football players selected to the College Football All-Southern Teams selected by various organizations for the 1913 Southern Intercollegiate Athletic Association football season.

The Auburn Tigers won the SIAA.

== Composite eleven ==
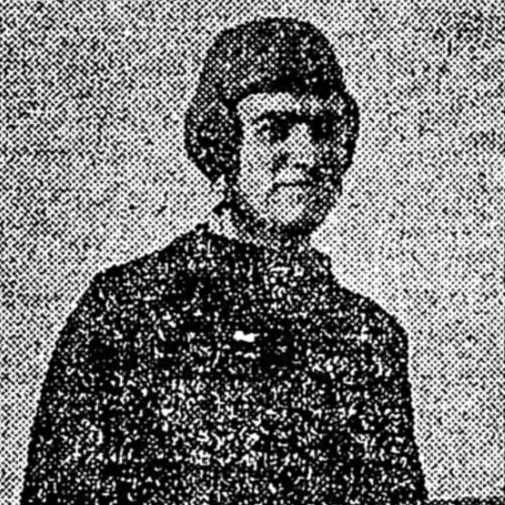
Big Thigpen of Auburn was a unanimous selection.

The composite All-Southern eleven formed by the selection of 18 sporting writers culled by the Atlanta Constitution included:

- Enoch Brown, end and captain for Vanderbilt, unanimous selection. Known as "Nuck," he was also a Rhodes Scholar.
- Tom Brown, tackle for Vanderbilt, unanimous selection. He played professional football with the Toledo Maroons and was later a prominent physician of Toledo. "He had no peers in his orthopedic ability and contributed greatly to Toledo medicine."
- Red Harris, fullback for Auburn. One writer describes his featured role in the offense: "Coach Donahue loved the fullback dive and would run the play over and over again before sending the elusive Newell wide on a sweep."
- R. N. MacCallum, guard for Sewanee. MacCallum was later a reverend serving several parishes.
- Bob McWhorter, halfback for Georgia. He was the school's first All-American, inducted into the College Football Hall of Fame in 1954. Sportswriter Dick Jemison said "When you mention football to an Athens fan its definition is Bob McWhorter, and vice-versa." He was selected for the Associated Press Southeast Area All-Time football team 1869-1919 era. McWhorter later had a lengthy law career.
- Kirk Newell, halfback and captain for Auburn. Newell gained 1,707 yards that year, 46% of the team's entire offensive output; and 5,800 yards rushing, 350 yards receiving, and 1,200 yards on punt returns for his career.
- David Paddock, quarterback for Georgia. He is the only player in school history to have a petition circulated by the student body requesting that he play for the Bulldogs.
- Boozer Pitts, center for Auburn. He later coached and was once professor of mathematics at Auburn.
- Robbie Robinson, end for Auburn. Robinson is selected at the end position for several all-time Auburn teams.
- Big Thigpen, guard for Auburn, unanimous selection. The Atlanta Constitution claimed he "rated as good as, if not better than, any guard in the south."
- Paul Turner, tackle for Georgia. His defensive work in the rivalry game against Georgia Tech was cited as helping the Bulldogs on the way to a 14–0 victory.

== Composite overview ==
Enoch Brown, Tom Brown, and Big Thigpen were unanimous selections.

Name	Position	School	First-team selections
Enoch Brown	End	Vanderbilt	18
Tom Brown	Tackle	Vanderbilt	18
Big Thigpen	Guard	Auburn	18
Bob McWhorter	Halfback	Georgia	17
Kirk Newell	Halfback	Auburn	16
Boozer Pitts	Center	Auburn	14
David Paddock	Quarterback	Georgia	13
Robbie Robinson	End	Auburn	11
Red Harris	Halfback	Auburn	9
Ammie Sikes	Fullback	Vanderbilt	9
Paul Turner	Tackle	Georgia	7
Tom Dutton	Tackle/Guard	LSU	7
Hugh Morgan	Center	Vanderbilt	7
Red Rainey	Halfback	Tennessee	6
R. N. MacCallum	Guard	Sewanee	5
Shorty Schilletter	Tackle	Clemson	4
Hargrove Van de Graaff	End	Alabama	3
Frank W. Lockwood	Guard	Auburn	3
Lee Tolley	Quarterback	Sewanee	3
Lou Louisell	Tackle	Auburn	2
John G. Henderson	Tackle	Georgia	2
Goat Carroll	End	Tennessee	2
Adrian Van de Graaff	Halfback	Alabama	2
W. K. McClure	End	Tennessee	1
Big Parker	End	Sewanee	1
Hugh Conklin	End	Georgia	1
Kirby Malone	Tackle	Georgia	1
Farmer Kelly	Tackle	Tennessee	1
E. B. Means	Guard	Georgia Tech	1
Sam Hayley	Guard	Tennessee	1
Carl Woodward	Guard	Tulane	1
Arthur Delaperriere	Center	Georgia	1
Alf Reid	Fullback	LSU	1

== All-Southerns of 1913 ==
=== Ends ===
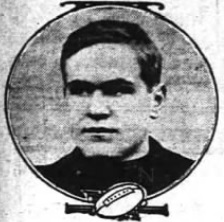
Enoch Brown of Vanderbilt.

- Enoch Brown†, Vanderbilt (C, ZC-1, SP-1, BC, D-1, AP, WL, AR)
- Robbie Robinson, Auburn (C, ZC-1, SP-1, D-1, AP)
- Hargrove Van de Graaff, Alabama (C, ZC-2, SP-2, BC)
- Goat Carroll, Tennessee (C)
- W. K. McClure, Tennessee (C)
- Big Parker, Sewanee (C)
- Hugh Conklin, Georgia (C, ZC-2, SP-2, D-2, AR)
- Bull Kearley, Auburn (D-2)
- William Huske, North Carolina (WL)
- Jenks Gillem, Sewanee (AR)
- Rip Major, Auburn (AR)
- William Jennings Gardner, Carlisle (AR)

=== Tackles ===
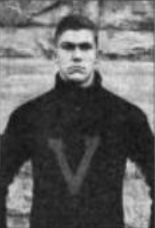
Tom Brown

- Tom Brown†, Vanderbilt (C, ZC-1, SP-1, BC, AP, AR)
- Paul Turner, Georgia (C, ZC-1, SP-1)
- Tom Dutton, LSU (C, SP-1 [as g], D-1)
- Shorty Schilletter, Clemson (C, SP-2, D-1, AP)
- John G. Henderson, Georgia (C, BC)
- Lou Louisell, Auburn (C, D-2)
- Farmer Kelly, Tennessee (C, ZC-2, SP-2)
- Sam Hayley, Tennessee (C, ZC-2, SP-2)
- Monroe Esslinger, Auburn (D-2)
- Ooch Moriarty, Georgetown (WL)
- Pichegru Woolfolk, Virginia (WL)
- B. J. Lamb, Auburn (AR)
- Guts Meadows, Auburn (AR)
- Arthur Maddox, Georgia (AR)
- Homer Cogdell, Auburn (AR)

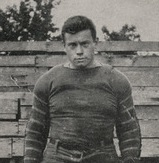
R. N. MacCallum of Sewanee.

=== Guards ===
- Big Thigpen†, Auburn (C, ZC-1, SP-1, BC, D-1, AP)
- R. N. MacCallum, Sewanee (C, ZC-2)
- Frank W. Lockwood, Auburn (C, ZC-2, D-1, AP, AR)
- Kirby Malone, Georgia (C, SP-2, BC, D-2)
- E. B. Means, Georgia Tech (C, AR)
- Carl Woodward, Tulane (C)
- Arthur Klock, LSU (SP-2, D-2)
- Miller, Washington & Lee (WL)
- Aubrey L. Carter, Virginia (WL)
- David Peacock, Georgia (AR)
- Louis Hasslock, Vanderbilt (AR)
- Eric Cheape, Sewanee (AR)
- Everett, Auburn (AR)

=== Centers ===
- Boozer Pitts, Auburn (C, ZC-1 [as g], SP-1, BC, D-1, AP, AR)
- Hugh Morgan, Vanderbilt (C, ZC-1, WL)
- Arthur Delaperriere, Georgia (C)
- Al Loeb, Georgia Tech (ZC-2, AR)
- Emmett Putnam, Vanderbilt (SP-2, D-2)

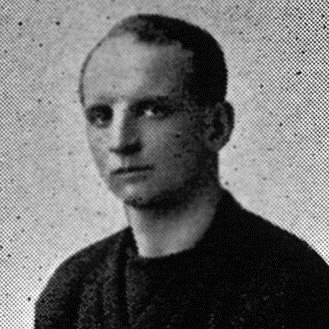
David Paddock.

=== Quarterbacks ===
- David Paddock, Georgia (C, ZC-1, SP-1, BC, D-1, AP)
- Red Rainey, Tennessee (C, ZC-1 [as hb], SP-2)
- Lee Tolley, Sewanee (C)
- Hord Boensch, Vanderbilt (ZC-2, D-2)
- Robert Kent Gooch, Virginia (WL)
- Ray Morrison, Vanderbilt (College Football Hall of Fame) (AR)
- Joe Smith, Unknown (AR)

=== Halfbacks ===
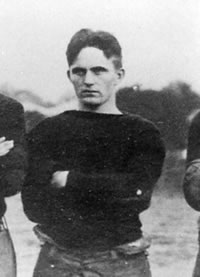
Kirk Newell of Auburn.

- Bob McWhorter, Georgia (College Football Hall of Fame) (C, ZC-1, SP-1, BC, D-1, AP, WL, AR [as fb])
- Kirk Newell, Auburn (C, ZC-1, SP-1, BC, D-1, AR)
- Adrian Van de Graaff, Alabama (C, D-2)
- Homer Cook, Georgia Tech (SP-2, D-2, AR)
- Harry Costello, Georgetown (WL)
- Stephen Crump, Georgia (SP-2)
- Lew Hardage, Vanderbilt (AR)

=== Fullbacks ===
- Red Harris, Auburn (C, ZC-1, SP-2, BC, D-2, AP)
- Ammie Sikes, Vanderbilt (C, ZC-2 [as hb], SP-1, D-1, AP [as hb])
- Alf Reid, LSU (C)
- Frank Hart, Auburn (ZC-2)
- Tenny, North Carolina A&M (WL)
- John E. Davis, Auburn (AR)
- E. K. Thomason, Georgia Tech (AR)

== Key ==
Bold = Composite selection

† = Unanimous selection

C = received votes for a composite All-Southern eleven compiled from 18 sports writers by the Atlanta Constitution.

ZC = compiled from sports writers, coaches, and others by Zora Clevenger, coach at University of Tennessee The coaches involved in the compilation were Clevenger of Tenn, Cunningham of Georgia, Graves of Alabama, Major of Clemson, Hardage of Mercer; McGugin of Vanderbilt, Cope of Sewanee, and Heisman of Tech. McWhorter and Rainey tied in votes, as many moved McWhorter to fullback to make room for him.

SP = posted by coach Bill Cunningham of the University of Georgia, combining selections of sports writers and coaches in the South.

BC = the personal selection of coach Cunningham of Georgia.

D = selected by Mike Donahue, coach at Auburn University. It had a first and second team.

AP = posted by the Associated Press.

WL = W. A. Lambeth of the University of Virginia.

AR = member of a Southern all star team which played against the Seventeenth Infantry of Army at West Point. It featured stars of previous seasons as well.

== See also ==
- 1913 College Football All-America Team
