= Baby Taylor =

American football player and coach (1892–1926)

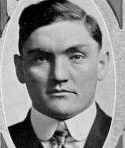
- Taylor from Auburn's yearbook, the Glomerata c. 1915

Profile
- Position: End/Tackle/Guard

Personal information
- Born: March 6, 1892; Birmingham, Alabama, U.S.
- Died: March 24, 1926 (aged 34); Birmingham, Alabama, U.S.
- Listed height: 6 ft 2 in (1.88 m)
- Listed weight: 194 lb (88 kg)

Career information
- College: Auburn (1913–1915)

Awards and highlights
- SIAA championship (1913, 1914); Third-team All-American (1915); All-Southern (1914, 1915)

George Ellis "Baby" Taylor (March 6, 1892 – March 24, 1926) was an American college football player and coach. He assisted the 1916 Spring Hill Badgers football team.

== Auburn University ==
=== Football ===
Taylor was a prominent tackle for Mike Donahue's Auburn Tigers of Auburn University from 1913 to 1915.

==== 1913 ====
He was a member of the undefeated Southern Intercollegiate Athletic Association (SIAA) champion 1913 team. One account of the enthusiasm after the victory over the Mississippi A & M Aggies that year reads '“If the Orange and Blue can show the same punch and the same speed against a heavier team, it is not believed that the Tigers will have to lower her colors to any team this year." Injuries became a concern when 220-pound right guard F.W. Lockwood and 194-pound end G.E. Taylor had knee and ankle problems. Taylor didn’t return. “These are the heaviest players on the Auburn squad and their loss deprives the line of any advantage it might have had because of superior weight.”'

==== 1914 ====
Taylor drew praise for his play against Georgia Tech in a 14 to 0 victory in 1914. In 1914 Auburn featured four All-Southern linemen; Taylor along with Bull Kearley, Boozer Pitts, and Big Thigpen. The student newspaper recalls in its announcement of Auburn as champions, "Babe Taylor, Auburn warrior, and by the way, Birmingham-bred, displayed a vast amount of gameness yesterday afternoon. In the early part of the first quarter someone, unthoughtedly of course, kicked in the upper section of Babe’s face, in the neighborhood of the left eye. Babe’s face wore an expression of agony and the blood trickled down his features in doublequick time, but he stood by the fort and played a grand game of football." One writer claims "Auburn had a lot of great football teams, but there may not have been one greater than the 1913–1914 team."

==== 1915 ====
Taylor was the only regular left at the start of the 1915 season. Taylor was a unanimous All-Southern selection along with Alabama's first All-American Bully Van de Graaff and Vanderbilt legend Rabbit Curry.

Weighing just under 200 pounds, Taylor would be a small player today, but he was then considered quite large, "worth three ordinary men."

Miss Virginia Gilmer, an Auburn fan of some 13 years of age once told Taylor that “if she were a boy and as big as he and had any sense at all she would be an all-southern tackle.”
