= Kirby Malone =

American football player and coach

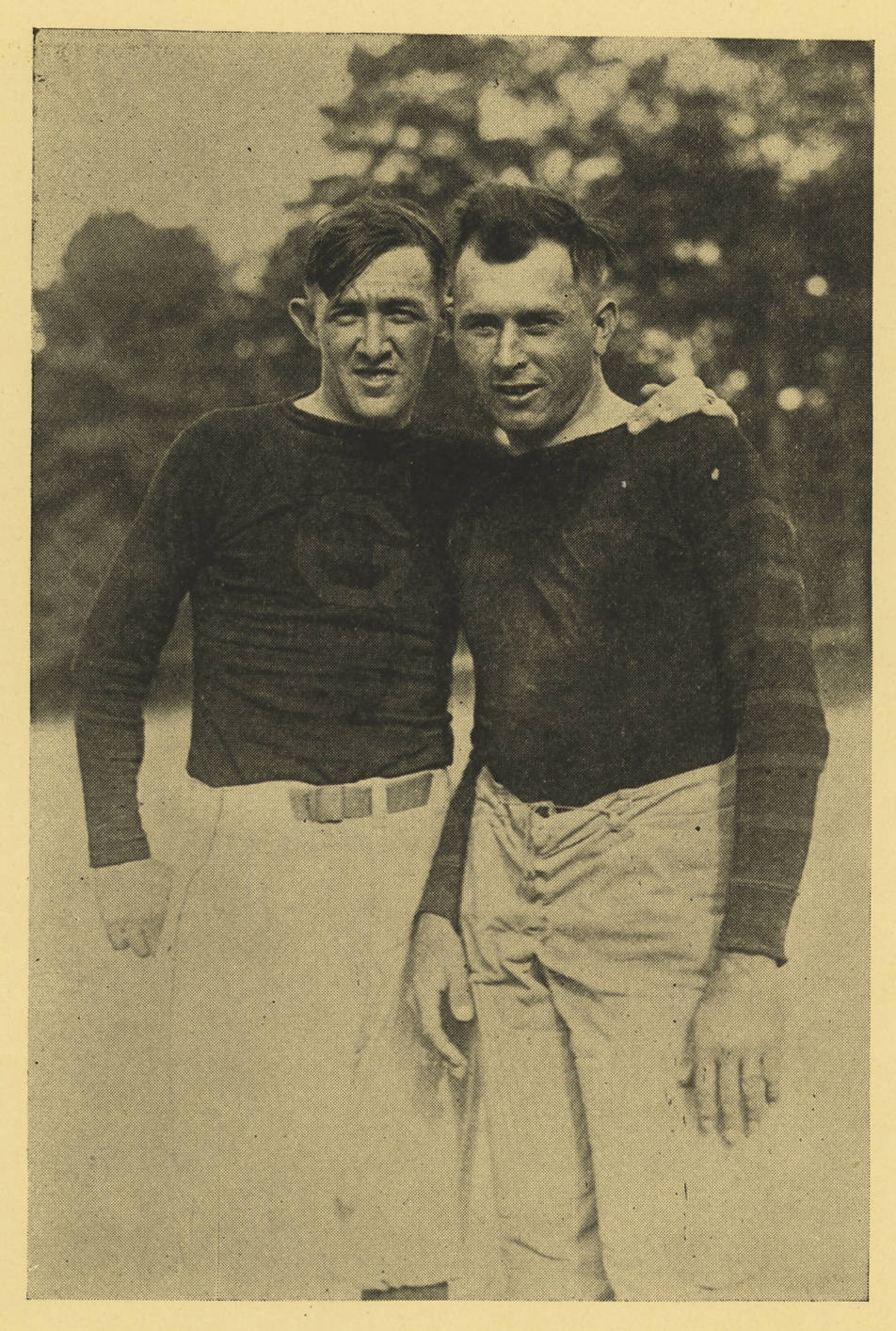
- Frank B. Anderson on the left and Malone.

Biographical details
- Born: May 14, 1891
- Died: March 1, 1951 (aged 59)
- Education: University of Georgia

Playing career
- 1911–1913: Georgia
- Position: Guard

Coaching career (HC unless noted)
- 1919–1920: Oglethorpe (assistant)

Accomplishments and honors

Awards
- All-Southern (1913)

Kirby Smith "Punk" Malone (May 14, 1891 – March 1, 1951) was a college football player, coach, and coal salesman.

== University of Georgia ==
Malone was a prominent guard and tackle for the Georgia Bulldogs football team of the University of Georgia. He had come from Stone Mountain University School and weighed 185 pounds.

=== 1913 ===
In 1913, Malone was selected All-Southern. Bob McWhorter and David Paddock were teammates.

== Coaching career ==
Malone was an assistant coach under Frank B. Anderson (1919) and Jogger Elcock (1920) at Oglethorpe University.
