= J. H. Thigpen =

American football player

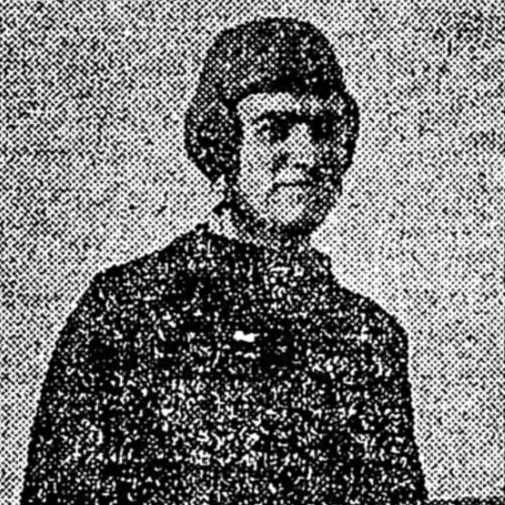
- Thigpen c. 1913

Profile
- Position: Guard

Personal information
- Listed weight: 200 lb (91 kg)

Career information
- College: Auburn (1912–1915)

Awards and highlights
- SIAA championship (1913, 1914); All-Southern (1912, 1913, 1914)

Jim H. Thigpen was a college football player.

== Auburn University ==
Thigpen was a prominent guard for Mike Donahue's Auburn Tigers of Auburn University from 1912 to 1915. He was a member of two teams which won a Southern Intercollegiate Athletic Association (SIAA) title in 1913 and 1914. He was a member of an All-time Auburn Tigers football team selected in 1935, as well as coach Donahue's all-time Auburn team. He was nominated though not selected for an Associated Press All-Time Southeast 1869-1919 era team.

=== 1913 ===
The Atlanta Constitution said he "rated as good as, if not better than, any guard in the south."

=== 1914 ===
In 1914 Auburn featured four All-Southern linemen: Thigpen along with Bull Kearley, Boozer Pitts, and Baby Taylor. The Constitution noted his "smashing brilliant game in the line." One writer claims "Auburn had a lot of great football teams, but there may not have been one greater than the 1913-1914 team."
