= Hugh Conklin =

American football player

Profile
- Position: End

Personal information
- Born: Atlanta, Georgia, U.S.

Career information
- College: Georgia (1910–1913)

Awards and highlights
- All-Southern (1913)

Hughbert William "Hugh" Conklin was an American college football player.

== University of Georgia ==
Conklin was a prominent end for the Georgia Bulldogs football team of the University of Georgia from 1910 to 1913. Conklin was from Atlanta.

=== 1912 ===
In 1912, Conklin caught the pass from Bob McWhorter to beat Auburn.

=== 1913 ===
He was selected All-Southern in 1913.
