= Alfred Reid =

Alfred Reid may refer to:

- Alfred Reid (bishop) (?–2019), bishop of the Anglican Diocese of Jamaica
- Alfred Reid (Australian politician) (1867–1945), Australian politician in the New South Wales Legislative Assembly
- Alfred E. Reid (1891–1955), Canadian politician in the Nova Scotia House of Assembly
- Alf Reid (Alfred J. Reid), college football player and chemist

== See also ==
- Al Reed (Alfred Lloyd Reed, 1925–1990), American musician
- Al Read (Alread Read, 1909–1987), British comedian
- Alfred Reed (1921–2005), American composer
- Blind Alfred Reed (1880–1956), American musician
- Alfred Hamish Reed, New Zealand publisher
