= Frank Lockwood =

Frank Lockwood may refer to:

- Frank Lockwood (politician) (1846–1897), English lawyer and Liberal Party politician
- Frank Lockwood (architect) (1865–1935), architect in Montgomery, Alabama
- Frank W. Lockwood (1890–1954), American college football guard
