= Reuben S. Parker =

American football player (1893–1957)

Big Parker
Profile
- Position: End/Fullback

Personal information
- Born: July 18, 1893; El Paso, Texas
- Died: September 10, 1957 (aged 64); El Paso, Texas

Career information
- College: Sewanee (1912–1914)

Awards and highlights
- All-Southern (1913, 1914); second-team All-time Sewanee football team

Reuben Samuel "Big" Parker Jr. (July 18, 1893 – September 10, 1957) was an American college football player.

== Sewanee ==
He was a prominent fullback and end for the Sewanee Tigers football team of Sewanee: The University of the South, chosen for the second-team all-time Sewanee football team. As a fullback he was touted as "'some' line plunger." Parker was from El Paso, Texas.

=== 1913 ===
Parker was selected All-Southern.

== World War I ==
Parker was a veteran of World War I.
