= Jimmie Hicks =

American football player

Profile
- Position: Guard

Career information
- College: Alabama (1911–1914)

Awards and highlights
- All-Southern (1914)

James W. Hicks was a college football player for the Alabama Crimson Tide of the University of Alabama from 1912 to 1914. He was selected All-Southern in 1914. Coach D. V. Graves said of his player Hicks: "There is no other guard down here who can break through the line and run down under punts as Hicks has done all the year."
