= Kirby Lee Spurlock =

American football player (1893–1977)

Profile
- Position: Guard

Personal information
- Born: April 7, 1893; Amite County, Mississippi
- Died: July 12, 1977 (aged 84)

Career information
- College: Mississippi A&M (1913–1916)

Awards and highlights
- All-Southern (1914, 1915)

Kirby Lee Spurlock (April 7, 1893 – July 12, 1977) was a college football player. He was a prominent guard for the Mississippi A&M Aggies from 1913 to 1916, captain of the 1916 team. He was selected All-Southern in 1914 and 1915.
