= W. K. McClure =

American football player

Profile
- Position: End

Career information
- College: Tennessee (1912–1915)

Awards and highlights
- All-Southern (1913)

W. K. McClure was a college football player. He was a prominent end for the Tennessee Volunteers of the University of Tennessee from 1912 to 1916. McClure was selected All-Southern in 1913. He was also a member of the Tennessee Kappa chapter of Sigma Alpha Epsilon.
