= R. N. MacCallum =

American football player and reverend (1888–1956)

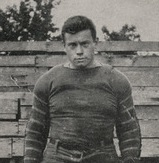
- MacCallum in football uniform c. 1913

Profile
- Position: Guard

Personal information
- Born: November 5, 1888; New York City, New York, U.S.
- Died: August 24, 1956 (aged 67); El Paso, Texas, U.S.
- Listed height: 5 ft 9 in (1.75 m)
- Listed weight: 191 lb (87 kg)

Career information
- High school: Mt. Vernon
- College: Sewanee (1910–1913)

Awards and highlights
- All-Southern (1912, 1913)

Robert Nelson MacCallum (November 5, 1888 – August 24, 1956) was a college football player and reverend.

== Early life ==
MacCallum attended Mt. Vernon High School.

== Sewanee ==
He was an All-Southern guard for the Sewanee Tigers of Sewanee: The University of the South, captain of the 1913 team. He graduated with a theology degree.

== Reverend ==
MacCallum was a seminarian who served parishes in Tennessee, Georgia, Texas, New Mexico, and South Carolina. He was admitted as a candidate for Holy Orders on June 23, 1914 in Savannah, Georgia.
