= Frank W. Lockwood =

American football player (1890–1954)

Profile
- Position: Guard

Personal information
- Born: July 14, 1890; Anniston, Alabama, U.S.
- Died: June 7, 1954 (aged 63); Foley, Alabama, U.S.
- Listed weight: 220 lb (100 kg)

Career information
- College: Auburn (1912–1914)

Awards and highlights
- SIAA championship (1913); All-Southern (1913)

Frank Wayne "Tubby" Lockwood (July 14, 1890 – June 7, 1954) was an American All-Southern college football guard for Mike Donahue's Auburn Tigers of Auburn University.

== Early life ==
Frank Wayne Lockwood was born on July 14, 1890, in Anniston, Alabama, the son of architect Frank Lockwood. He grew up in Montgomery, Alabama.

== College football ==
He and Big Thigpen made up the core of the line of the undefeated SIAA champion 1913 Auburn Tigers football team. One account of the enthusiasm after the victory over the Mississippi A & M Aggies that year reads '“If the Orange and Blue can show the same punch and the same speed against a heavier team, it is not believed that the Tigers will have to lower her colors to any team this year,” a story said. Injuries became a concern when 220-pound right guard F.W. Lockwood and 194-pound end G.E. Taylor had knee and ankle problems. Taylor didn't return. “These are the heaviest players on the Auburn squad and their loss deprives the line of any advantage it might have had because of superior weight.”' Lockwood was selected to coach Donahue's all-time Auburn team. One writer claims "Auburn had a lot of great football teams, but there may not have been one greater than the 1913-1914 team."
