= Bull Kearley =

American football player (1891–1977)

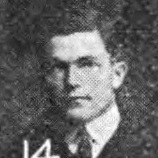
- Kearley from the 1914 team picture

Profile
- Position: Halfback/End

Personal information
- Born: August 25, 1891; Franklin, Alabama, U.S.
- Died: August 11, 1977 (aged 85); Andalusia, Alabama, U.S.
- Listed weight: 180 lb (82 kg)

Career information
- College: Auburn (1911–1914)

Awards and highlights
- SIAA championship (1913, 1914); All-Southern (1913, 1914)

Richard Irven "Bull" Kearley (August 25, 1891 – August 11, 1977) was an American college football player.

== Early life ==
"Bull" Kearley was born on August 25, 1891, in Franklin, Alabama of Monroe County to Irvin James Kearley and Frances E. Gaines.

== Auburn University ==
Kearley was a prominent football player for Mike Donahue's Auburn Tigers of Auburn University from 1911 to 1914, winning two Southern Intercollegiate Athletic Association (SIAA) titles with Auburn and selected for All-Southern teams in 1913 and 1914.

=== 1913 ===
He was shifted from halfback to end in 1913, playing opposite Robbie Robinson. Donahue's 7-Box or 7-2-2 defensive scheme required fast ends which could disrupt a play from the start; a role filled by Kearley.

=== 1914 ===
He recovered three fumbles in the game with Georgia Tech in 1914, a 14 to 0 victory. "Bull Kearley was the star on both sides and gave an exhibition of football the like of which has never seen on a southern gridiron before. He covered every punt and nearly every time nailed the man in his tracks, once coming down the field so hard that the man, receiving the punt, fumbled it to get out of the way." One writer claims "Auburn had a lot of great football teams, but there may not have been one greater than the 1913-1914 team."
