= Sam Hayley =

American football player (1890–1970)

Profile
- Position: Tackle

Personal information
- Born: July 31, 1890; Jackson, Tennessee, U.S.
- Died: November 1, 1970 (aged 80); Fairfield, Alabama, U.S.
- Listed weight: 168 lb (76 kg)

Career information
- High school: Jackson
- College: Tennessee (1911–1913)

Awards and highlights
- All-Southern (1913)

Samuel Benjamin Hayley (July 31, 1890 – November 1, 1970) was an American college football player. His registration for the First World War says he was a chemist. Hayley was from Jackson, Tennessee.

== University of Tennessee ==
Hayley was a prominent tackle for the Tennessee Volunteers football teams of the University of Tennessee, captain of the 1913 team. He was selected All-Southern the same year. At Tennessee, he was a member of Sigma Alpha Epsilon.
