= Paul Turner (tackle) =

American football player

Profile
- Position: Tackle

Career information
- College: Georgia (1913)

Awards and highlights
- All-Southern (1913)

Paul Turner was a college football player.

== Georgia Bulldogs ==
Turner was a prominent tackle for the Georgia Bulldogs of the University of Georgia, selected All-Southern in 1913. His defensive work in the game against Georgia Tech that year was cited as helping the Bulldogs on the way to a 14–0 victory.
