= William Schilletter =

American football player and lieutenant (1893–1974)

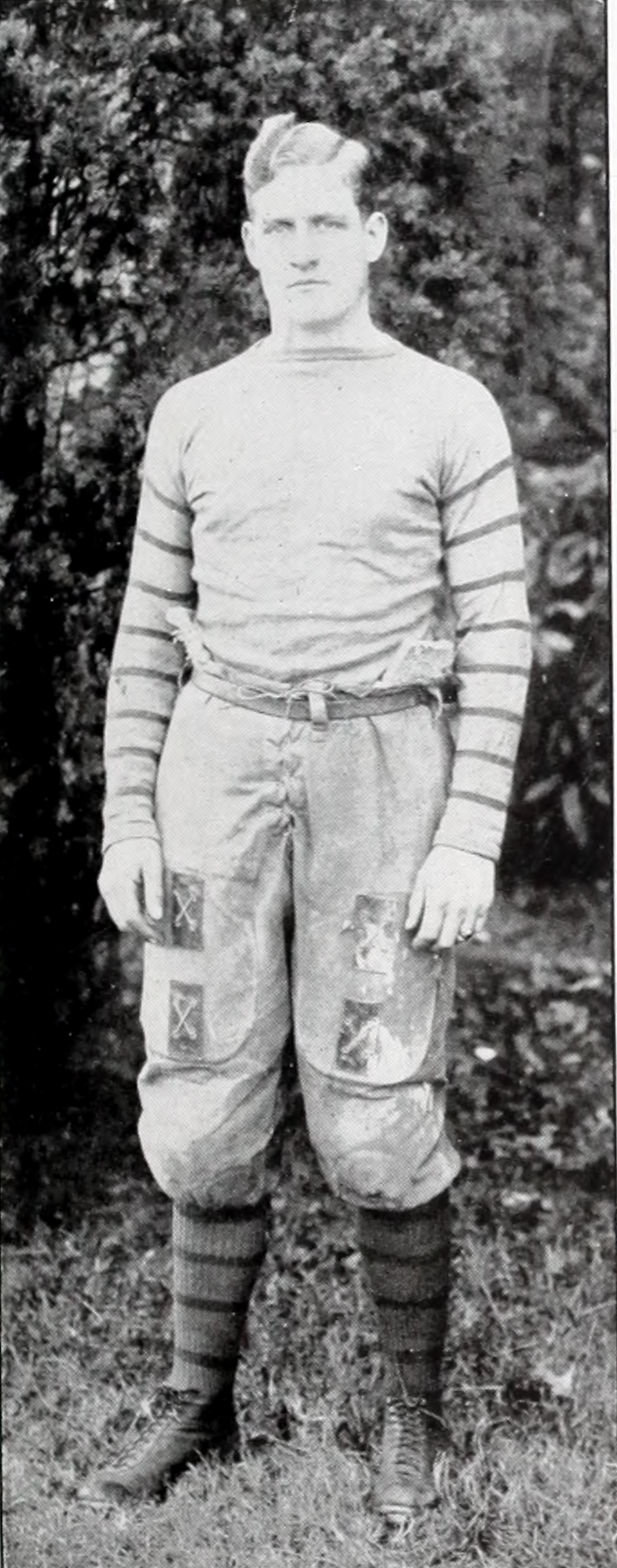

Profile
- Position: Tackle/Guard

Personal information
- Born: December 25, 1893; Anderson, South Carolina, U.S.
- Died: September 14, 1974 (aged 80); Goldsboro, North Carolina, U.S.
- Listed weight: 200 lb (91 kg)

Career information
- College: Clemson (1911–1914)

Awards and highlights
- All-Southern (1913, 1914); Clemson Athletic Hall of Fame

William Albert "Shorty" Schilletter (December 25, 1893 – September 14, 1974) was a college football player and lieutenant.

== Early life ==
William was the son of Augustus "Shorty" Schilletter, a German immigrant in charge of the Clemson College dining hall.

== College football ==
Schilletter was an All-Southern tackle for the Clemson Tigers of Clemson University, captain of the 1914 team. He was a charter member of the Clemson Athletic Hall of Fame inducted in 1973.

== Military ==
Following his playing career, he went into the military.
