= Henry W. Robinson =

American football player and coach

Robbie Robinson
Profile
- Position: End

Personal information
- Born: October 26, 1893; Brooklyn, Conecuh County, Alabama, U.S.
- Listed weight: 170 lb (77 kg)

Career information
- College: Auburn (1911–1914)

Awards and highlights
- SIAA championship (1913, 1914); All-Southern (1913, 1914)

Henry William "Robbie" "Captain" Robinson (October 26, 1893 – ?) was an American college football player and coach. During the First World War, he played for the 1917 Camp Gordon football team.

== Auburn University ==
He was a prominent end for Mike Donahue's Auburn Tigers of Auburn University from 1911 to 1914. He was a member of an All-time Auburn Tigers football team selected in 1935, as well as coach Donahue's all-time Auburn team. He was nominated though not selected for an Associated Press All-Time Southeast 1869-1919 era team.

=== 1913 ===
Robinson was All-Southern in 1913.

=== 1914 ===
He was captain of the 1914 team. One writer claims "Auburn had a lot of great football teams, but there may not have been one greater than the 1913-1914 team."

== Coaching career ==
Robinson assisted coach Bill Alexander and the national champion 1928 Georgia Tech Golden Tornado football team by coaching the ends.
