= Red Harris =

Biographical details
- Born: May 15, 1892; Fayette, Alabama, U.S.
- Died: August 18, 1953 (aged 61); Birmingham, Alabama, U.S.
- Education: Auburn University, University of Alabama

Playing career
- 1912–1914: Auburn
- Position: Fullback

Coaching career (HC unless noted)
- 1915: Spring Hill

Head coaching record
- Overall: 6–1

Accomplishments and honors

Awards
- All-Southern (1913)

Festus Urban "Red" Harris (May 15, 1892 – August 18, 1953) was an American college football and baseball player and coach.

== Auburn ==
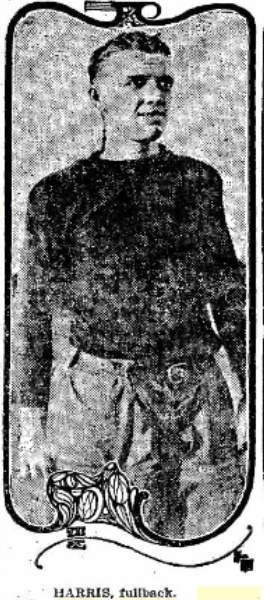
Harris c. 1913

Harris was a prominent football and baseball player. One account reads:

"In the athletic history of Auburn, there never has been a single man who has ever exceeded the records that the famous "Red" Harris made there. He was for three years member of Auburn's varsity baseball team and captain of the same team during the past year. He was fullback on the varsity football team for the last three years, and has another year in which to play, but owing to the severe injuries sustained in the Carlisle–Auburn game of football at Atlanta last December in the post-season game, will be unable to finish his four years of football at Auburn."

=== Football ===
Harris was a fullback on Mike Donahue's Auburn Tigers of Auburn University. He weighed 148 pounds.

=== 1913 ===
Harris featured on the offense of the 1913 team which won the Southern Intercollegiate Athletic Association (SIAA) title. One writer summarizes this: "Coach Donahue loved the fullback dive and would run the play over and over again before sending the elusive Newell wide on a sweep." Harris was selected All-Southern. One writer claims "Auburn had a lot of great football teams, but there may not have been one greater than the 1913-1914 team."

== Mobile ==
Harris then went to Mobile, Alabama to attend the University of Alabama school of medicine and took the job coaching football at Spring Hill College.

== Head coaching record ==
Year	Team	Overall	Conference	Standing	Bowl/playoffs
Spring Hill Badgers (Independent) (1915)
1915	Spring Hill	6–1			
Spring Hill:		6–1			
Total:		6–1			
