= R. V. Kerr =

American football player and educator (1891–1960)

No. 2
- Position: Guard

Personal information
- Born: June 29, 1891; Savannah, Tennessee, US
- Died: August 11, 1960 (aged 69); Bossier City, Louisiana, US
- Listed weight: 180 lb (82 kg)

Career information
- High school: Savannah Institute
- College: Tennessee (1911–1914)

Awards and highlights
- SIAA championship (1914); All-Southern (1914)

Robert Vance "Mush" Kerr (June 29, 1891 – August 11, 1960) was a college football player. After college, he was a prominent educator.

== College football ==
Kerr was a prominent guard for the Tennessee Volunteers of the University of Tennessee from 1911 to 1914. Kerr was selected All-Southern, and anchored the line with captain Farmer Kelly on the SIAA champion 1914 team, the first championship of any kind for the Tennessee program. Winning all nine of their games, the 1914 squad was only the second undefeated team in Tennessee history. The 1914 Vols were retroactively awarded a national championship by 1st-N-Goal, though this remains largely unrecognized. One account of the Sewanee game reads "Mush Kerr played a wonderful game in the line as did Capt. Kelly. The work of the Tennessee line was easily the feature of the contest, and Sewanee early discovered that it was practically useless to rely on line plunges to gain ground."

== Educator ==
After completing his formal education, Kerr was coach and teacher of Mathematics and science at Amory, Mississippi. He resigned that position to join the teaching staff at Tennessee Polytechnic Institute at Cooksville.
