= P. R. Bidez =

American football player, coach, and bandleader

Bedie Bidez
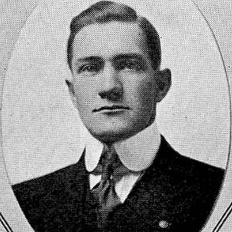
- Bidez in the 1915 Glomerata

Biographical details
- Born: January 14, 1892; Georgia, U.S.
- Died: February 5, 1961 (aged 69); Auburn, Alabama, U.S.
- Education: Auburn University

Playing career
- 1913–1915: Auburn
- Position: Fullback

Coaching career (HC unless noted)
- 1919: Auburn (assistant)

Accomplishments and honors

Championships
- 2 SIAA (1913, 1914)

Awards
- 2x All-Southern (1914, 1915)

Paul Rubens "Bedie" Bidez (January 14, 1892 – February 5, 1961) was an American football player and coach for the Auburn Tigers of Auburn University and a director of its band from 1919 to 1951. Bidez was a member of the 1913 and 1914 teams. He weighed 175 pounds. One writer claims "Auburn had a lot of great football teams, but there may not have been one greater than the 1913–1914 team." Bidez was captain of the 1915 team. Under his watch, the band tripled in size and the university established a Department of Music.

An account of the 1915 Auburn–Georgia game features Bidez:

Of a sudden we saw the ball on Georgia's 12-yard line. Big Bidez humped his back like an enraged bobeat and flew into the Red and Black line like a runaway box car. And again...and again...and then there was a dancing and a cavorting on the side lines, and you could see mouths open to an unbelievable extent, but if any sounds issued therefrom it made no difference, for all the world was one smear of sound and fury.

"Bedie was a proud bandmaster. His love for Auburn was deep-seated and he worked long hours to elevate the boys and girls at Auburn into crack drill teams. Yet, Bedie refused to permit flairs and color to take away the depth and quality of the music."
