= Alf Reid =

American football player and chemist

Profile
- Position: Fullback

Personal information
- Born: Lake Charles, Louisiana

Career information
- College: LSU (1912–1915)

Awards and highlights
- All-Southern (1913)

Alfred J. Reid was a college football player and chemist. A native of Lake Charles, he was a prominent fullback for the LSU Tigers. He was selected All-Southern in 1913. He was captain of the 1915 team.
