= Lou Louisell =

American football player and coach (1895–1957)

Biographical details
- Born: March 2, 1895; Manistee, Alabama, US
- Died: July 2, 1957 (aged 62); Washington, D. C., US
- Education: Auburn University

Playing career
- 1911–1914: Auburn
- 1921: Fort Benning
- Position: Tackle

Coaching career (HC unless noted)
- 1915–1919: Auburn (assistant)

Accomplishments and honors

Championships
- 1 SIAA (as player) (1913); 1 SIAA (as assistant) (1919)

Awards
- second-team All-Southern (1913)

William Charles "Lou" or "Bill" Louisell (March 2, 1895 – July 2, 1957) was a college football player and coach for Mike Donahue's Auburn Tigers of Auburn University. After playing one year in the backfield, he was shifted to the line and was chosen second-string All-Southern as a member of the undefeated 1913 SIAA championship team. He made the varsity in his first year, and was also the team's best punter. He weighed 183 pounds and was "one of the most aggressive tackles has ever had." One writer claims "Auburn had a lot of great football teams, but there may not have been one greater than the 1913–1914 team."

He was an assistant coaching the scrub team after he graduated, including for the SIAA champion 1919 team. He then joined the Army. In 1921, he played for the Fort Benning team which Auburn defeated. He was assistant professor of military science and tactics at the University of Michigan.
