= 1914 Auburn Tigers football team =

American college football season

1914 Auburn Tigers football
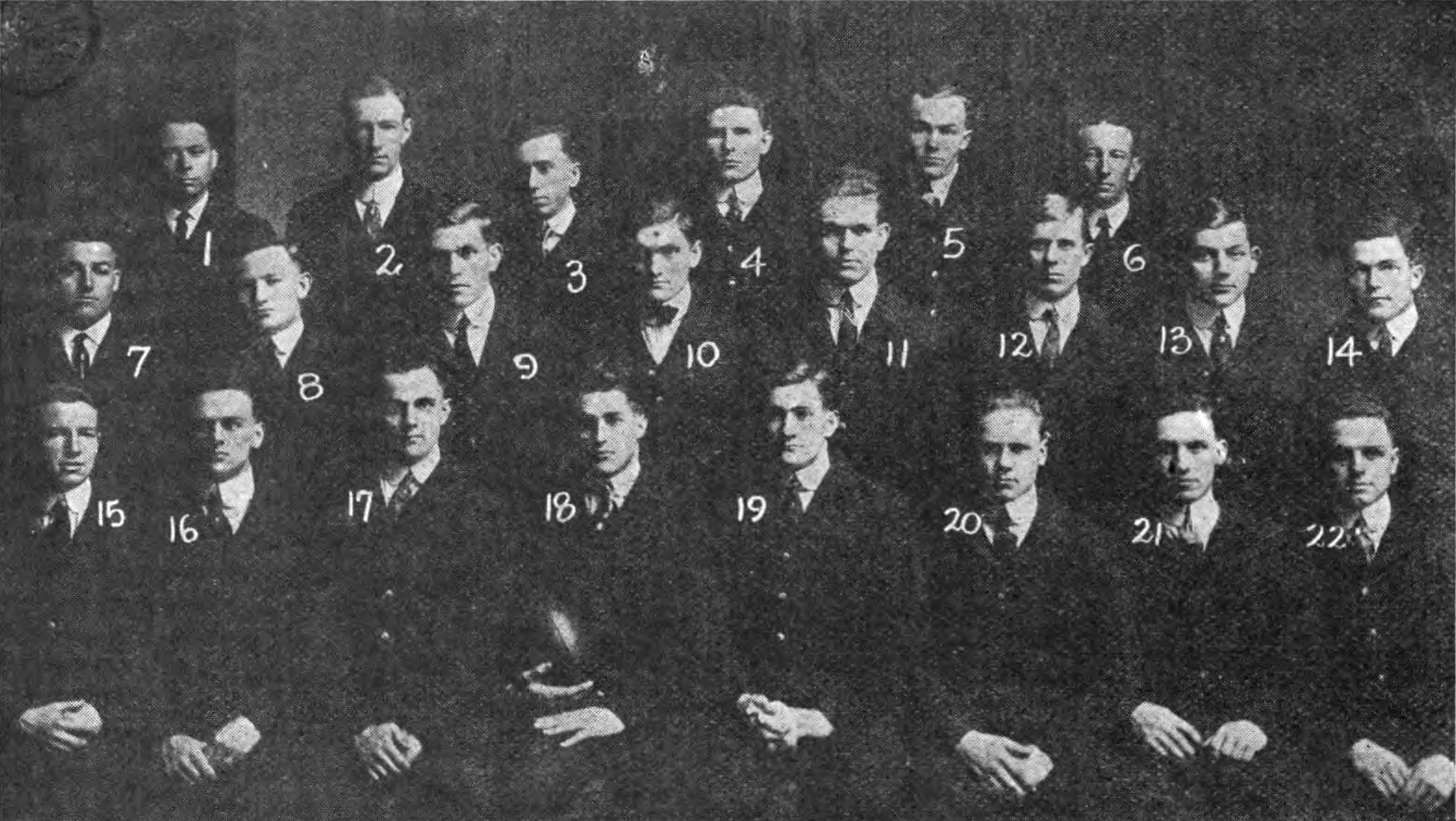

National Champion (James Howell’s Power Ratings) SIAA co-champion
- Conference: Southern Intercollegiate Athletic Association
- Record: 8–0–1 (4–0–1 SIAA)
- Head coach: Mike Donahue (10th season)
- Base defense: 7–2–2
- Captain: Henry W. Robinson
- Home stadium: Drake Field; Rickwood Field

1914 Southern Intercollegiate Athletic Association football standings
	Conf.					Overall
Team	W		L		T	W		L		T
Tennessee +	6	–	0	–	0	9	–	0	–	0
Auburn +	4	–	0	–	1	8	–	0	–	1
Texas A&M	2	–	0	–	0	6	–	1	–	1
Ole Miss	2	–	1	–	1	5	–	4	–	1
Mississippi A&M	4	–	2	–	0	6	–	2	–	0
Sewanee	4	–	2	–	0	5	–	3	–	0
Florida	3	–	2	–	0	5	–	2	–	0
Georgia	2	–	2	–	1	3	–	5	–	1
Clemson	2	–	2	–	0	5	–	3	–	1
Alabama	3	–	3	–	0	5	–	4	–	0
Kentucky	1	–	1	–	0	5	–	3	–	0
LSU	1	–	2	–	1	4	–	4	–	1
Chattanooga	1	–	3	–	0	5	–	4	–	0
Vanderbilt	1	–	3	–	0	2	–	6	–	0
Mississippi College	0	–	1	–	1	4	–	3	–	1
Wofford	0	–	1	–	0	1	–	7	–	1
Central University	0	–	1	–	0	1	–	3	–	1
Mercer	0	–	3	–	0	5	–	4	–	0
Tulane	0	–	3	–	1	3	–	3	–	1
The Citadel	0	–	3	–	0	2	–	5	–	0
+ – Conference co-champions

The 1914 Auburn Tigers football team represented Auburn University (then called the Alabama Polytechnic Institute) in the 1914 Southern Intercollegiate Athletic Association football season. It was the Tigers' 23rd overall season and they competed as a member of the Southern Intercollegiate Athletic Association (SIAA). The team was led by head coach Mike Donahue, in his 10th year, and played their home games at Drake Field in Auburn, Alabama. They finished as SIAA Champions with a record of eight wins, zero losses and one tie (8–0–1 overall, 4–0–1 in the SIAA) and outscored opponents 193–0.

Auburn claims a national title for 1914. None of the five NCAA-designated major selectors for 1914 made Auburn their choice as national champion. Out of 23 other mostly retroactive selectors, one chose the 1914 Tigers in 2000. Auburn did not claim this title until 2025.

== Before the season ==
Auburn returned another powerful team minus Kirk Newell. "Bull" Kearley was shifted from halfback to end to add speed to the defensive line.

== Schedule ==
Date	Opponent	Site	Result	Attendance	Source
September 26	Marion*	Drake Field; Auburn, AL	W 39–0		
October 3	Fourth District Agricultural School*	Drake Field; Auburn, AL	W 60–0		
October 10	at Florida	Barrs Field; Jacksonville, FL (rivalry)	W 20–0		
October 17	Clemson	Drake Field; Auburn, AL (rivalry)	W 28–0		
October 24	Mississippi A&M	Rickwood Field; Birmingham, AL	W 19–0		
November 7	at Georgia Tech*	Grant Field; Atlanta, GA (rivalry)	W 14–0		
November 14	Vanderbilt	Rickwood Field; Birmingham, AL	W 6–0	10,000	
November 21	at Georgia	Grant Field; Atlanta, GA (rivalry)	T 0–0		
December 5	vs. Carlisle*	Grant Field; Atlanta, GA	W 7–0		
*Non-conference game; Source:

== Season summary ==
=== Marion Military Institute ===
The season opened with a 28–0 win over the Marion Military Institute.

=== Fourth District ===
Against the Fourth District Agricultural School of Hamilton, Alabama came the season's biggest win, 60–0.

=== At Florida ===
Auburn at Florida

Team	1	2	3	4	Total
• Auburn	0	0	7	13	20
Florida	0	0	0	0	0

- Date: October 10
- Location: Jacksonville, Florida

In Jacksonville, Auburn defeated the Florida Gators 20–0. Auburn's team was nearly as strong as the season before and claims another SIAA title. In contrast to the prior season, the 20–0 loss was seen as a moral victory and sign of progress for the Gators. However, the Florida also lost its captain. John Sutton left the game feeling poorly, and further examination revealed a weak heart. Auburn's backfield performed well, and Florida gave way by the second half. Bedie Bidez made two touchdowns.

=== Clemson ===
Auburn beat the Clemson Tigers 28–0.

=== Mississippi A&M ===
Despite several fumbles, Auburn beat the Mississippi Aggies 19–0. One touchdown came on a delayed pass of 35 yards.

The starting lineup was Steed (left end), Culpepper (left tackle), Sample (left guard), Pitts (center), Taylor (right guard), Louiselle (right tackle), Robinson (right end), Arnold (quarterback), Hairston (left halfback), Hart (right halfback), Harris (fullback).

=== Georgia Tech ===
Auburn at Georgia Tech

Team	1	2	3	4	Total
• Auburn	0	7	0	7	14
Ga. Tech	0	0	0	0	0

- Date: November 7
- Location: Grant Field
  Atlanta
- Referee: Innis Brown

Auburn defeated John Heisman's Georgia Tech team 14–0. Tech would not lose to a southern team for 5 years after this.

Auburn scored first in the second quarter, Prendergast carrying the ball over. Red Hart had a 10-yard touchdown run in the fourth for the other score.

The starting lineup was Kearley (left end), Steed (left tacle), Taylor (left guard), Pitts (center), Thigpen (right guard), Louiselle (right tackle), Robinson (end), Hairston (quarterback), Prendergast (left halfback), Hart (right halfback), Harris (fullback).

=== Vanderbilt ===
Vanderbilt at Auburn

Team	1	2	3	4	Total
Vanderbilt	0	0	0	0	0
• Auburn	6	0	0	0	6

- Date: November 14
- Location: Rickwood Field
  Birmingham, Alabama
- Game attendance: 10,000
- Referee: Bradley Walker

In dreary weather, Auburn beat the Vanderbilt Commodores 6–0. In less than eight minutes of play, Red Harris made the decisive touchdown.

The starting lineup was Kearley (left end), Steed (left tacle), Taylor (left guard), Pitts (center), Thigpen (right guard), Louiselle (right tackle), Robinson (end), Hairston (quarterback), Prendergast (left halfback), Hart (right halfback), Harris (fullback).

=== Georgia ===
All-American David Paddock and the Georgia Bulldogs held the Tigers to a scoreless tie. Auburn fumbled often in their own territory, then stood "like Petain at Verdun."

=== Carlisle ===
In final game of the season, Auburn defeated the Carlisle Indians led by Pete Calac and coached by Pop Warner. It was the first intersectional game in Atlanta.

== Postseason ==
Auburn claimed a share of an SIAA title.
