= Hunter Kimball =

American football player

Profile
- Positions: Halfback, end

Personal information
- Born: July 14, 1893; Jackson, Mississippi, U.S.
- Died: May 29, 1972 (aged 78); Gulfport, Mississippi, U.S.
- Listed weight: 175 lb (79 kg)

Career information
- College: Mississippi A&M (1911–1914)

Awards and highlights
- All-Southern (1914)

Hunter Hudson Kimball (July 14, 1893 – May 29, 1972) was an American college football player and the first Executive Director of the Mississippi Game and Fish Commission.

== Mississippi State ==
Kimball was a prominent Halfback for the Mississippi A & M Aggies of Mississippi A & M University. His playing in the 1911 Egg Bowl, then his position was at end, was cited as 'superb' by the Commercial Appeal. That year Mississippi A & M was invited to its first postseason bowl game, the Bacardi Bowl in Havana, Cuba. He received the most votes of any All-Southern halfback in 1914. He was nominated though not selected for an Associated Press All-Time Southeast 1869-1919 era team.

== Fish and Game Commission ==
Kimball was the first Executive Director of the Mississippi Game and Fish Commission, appointed to the position in 1932.

== Family life ==
Kimball's son, Hunter Jr., was a casualty of the Korean War.
