= Kirk Newell =

American sportsperson (1890–1967)

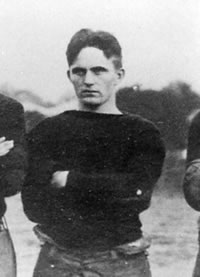
- Newell cropped from 1913 team picture

Profile
- Positions: Halfback, quarterback

Personal information
- Born: November 4, 1890; Dadeville, Alabama, U.S.
- Died: January 15, 1967 (aged 76); Birmingham, Alabama, U.S.
- Listed weight: 150 lb (68 kg)

Career information
- College: Auburn (1910–1913)

Awards and highlights
- SIAA championship (1910, 1913); All-Southern (1912, 1913); Alabama Sports Hall of Fame

James Kirk "Runt" Newell (November 4, 1890 – January 15, 1967) was an American college football and college baseball player for the Auburn Tigers of Auburn University. He lettered four years in both, as well as once in each of basketball, track, and soccer. He was inducted into the Alabama Sports Hall of Fame in 1994.

== Early life ==
Kirk Newell was born on November 4, 1890, in Dadeville, Alabama, to James Wesley Newell and Mary Ella Wise.

== Auburn University ==
Newell was a prominent member of Mike Donahue's football teams which over his four years from 1910 to 1913, accumulating a win–loss–tie record of 24–4–2 (.833) and outscored opponents 639 to 111. He was a member of an All-time Auburn Tigers football team selected in 1935, put at quarterback, as well as on coach Donahue's all-time Auburn team. At Auburn, he was a member of Pi Kappa Alpha. He was nominated though not selected for an Associated Press All-Time Southeast 1869–1919 era team.

=== 1913 ===
He was captain of the Southern Intercollegiate Athletic Association (SIAA) champion 1913 team. which has been selected as a national champion by various selectors retroactively. Newell gained 1,707 yards that year, 46% of the team's entire offensive output; and 5,800 yards rushing, 350 yards receiving, and 1,200 yards on punt returns for his career. One writer claims "Auburn had a lot of great football teams, but there may not have been one greater than the 1913-1914 team."

=== 1920 ===
He coached football at Auburn from 1914–1916 and 1922–1925.

== First World War ==
Newell received the Distinguished Service Award for his service in the First World War. According to David Housel, while in France Newell laid on top of a hand grenade set to explode on a group of people he knew, taking the brunt of the explosion himself. Newell was severely wounded after the act of selflessness. 36 pieces of scrap iron were removed from his body.

He also played football during the war, as the quarterback on the Camp Gordon team in 1917.
