= Franklin, Monroe County, Alabama =

Franklin, Alabama
- Unincorporated community
- Location within Alabama Location within the United States
- Coordinates: 31.71459°N 87.41137°W
- Country: United States
- State: Alabama
- County: Monroe
- Elevation: 331 ft (101 m)
- Time zone: UTC-6 (Central (CST))
  - Summer (DST): UTC-5 (CDT)
- ZIP code: 36444
- Area code: 251

Franklin is an unincorporated community in Monroe County, Alabama, United States.

== Geography ==
Franklin is located at 31.71459°N 87.41137°W and has an elevation of 331 feet (101 m).
