= David E. Housel =

Athletic director

- Born: 1947 (age 78–79)
- Education: Auburn University
- Occupation: Former Director of Athletics
- Years active: 1969–2006
- Employer: Auburn University
- Known for: Auburn Tigers Director of Athletics

David E. Housel is a former director of athletics for the Auburn Tigers Athletics Department.

He was named Auburn's 13th Director of Athletics on April 1, 1994, and held that position until 2006.

David Housel graduated from Auburn University in 1969. After spending two years working in the ticket office, he began teaching journalism classes to young Auburn students. He then returned to the athletic department where he eventually rose to the position of assistant athletic director in 1985. He became athletic director in 1994 and retired after eleven successful years. He has dedicated more than 40 years to Auburn University, and was the athletic department's sports information director from 1981–94.

== Career ==
Housel graduated from Auburn University in 1969 with a degree in journalism. He was news editor of The Huntsville News 1969–70, returning to Auburn as an administrative assistant in the athletic department ticket office 1970–72. He was an instructor in journalism at Auburn University and advisor to The Plainsman 1972-80. He became Assistant Sports Information Director under Buddy Davidson on July 1, 1980, and when Davidson relinquished in 1981, Housel was named sports information director. In April 1994 Housel was named athletic director, a position held until January 2005. Today, he is regarded as the unofficial historian of Auburn University.

Housel is a past president of the SEC SID's, and a former chair of the NCAA Public Relations and Communications committees. He worked 18 straight Final Fours and served on the Media Coordination Committee from 1983 through 1994 when he was named athletic director. He has also served on the District III Postgraduate Scholarship Committee, and has served as chair of the Dean's Council for Auburn's College of Liberal Arts. Housel was also a member of the NCAA Championships Cabinet and the executive committee of the Southeastern Conference.

Auburn won more than 30 Southeastern Conference titles during Housel’s tenure as AD, and an average of 14 Auburn teams a year advanced to post-season play during that span. Auburn Athletics also experienced unprecedented facilities enhancements during that time as well, including but not limited to the construction of Samford Stadium-Hitchcock Field at Plainsman Park, Jane B. Moore Field, the McWhorter Center for Women’s Athletics and the James T. Tatum Strength and Conditioning Center.

== Personal life ==
An award-winning freelance writer, Housel has written several books, including "Saturdays To Remember," "From the Desk of David Housel, A Collection of Auburn Stories." and "Auburn Glory Days: The Greatest Victories in Tigers History". An honorary member of the Auburn Football Lettermen Club and the University Singers, he is also a member of three Halls of Fame, the Sports Information Directors' Hall of Fame (1998), the Tony Brandino Hall of Fame (1998), and his hometown Hall of Fame. Housel still lives in Auburn.

== Awards ==
The press box at Auburn's Jordan-Hare Stadium was officially named the David E. Housel Press Box in a dedication ceremony prior to the Tigers' 2005 football game against Mississippi. He was presented with the 2011 Coach Jack Meagher Award at Auburn University, an award is presented annually, “to a person with Auburn University affiliation who made significant contributions to society through athletics.”

He is also a past recipient of the Walter Camp Football Foundation Distinguished Service Award, and the Alabama Sports Hall of Fame honored him as a Distinguished Alabama Sportsman.
