= David Paddock =

American football player (1892–1962)

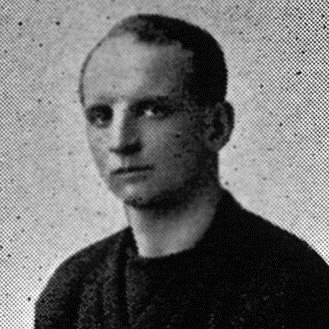
- Paddock c. 1914

No. 18
- Position: Quarterback

Personal information
- Born: June 9, 1892; Selma, Alabama, U.S.
- Died: May 23, 1962 (aged 69); Miami, Florida, U.S.
- Listed weight: 152 lb (69 kg)

Career information
- High school: Peddie Institute
- College: Georgia (1912-1915)

Awards and highlights
- All-American (1914); All-Southern (1913, 1914, 1915)

David Fleming Paddock (June 9, 1892 – May 23, 1962) was an American college football player.

== Early life ==
David Paddock was born on June 9, 1892, in Selma, Alabama to Smith Aaron Paddock and Jennie Fleming Cain. He grew up in Brooklyn, New York. Paddock attended the Peddie Institute of New Jersey.

== University of Georgia ==
He was a prominent quarterback for the Georgia Bulldogs of the University of Georgia from 1912 to 1915, earning All-Southern honors in 1913, 1914, and 1915. Paddock is the only player in school history to have a petition circulated by the student body requesting that he play for the Bulldogs. He made an all-time Georgia Bulldogs football team picked in 1935.

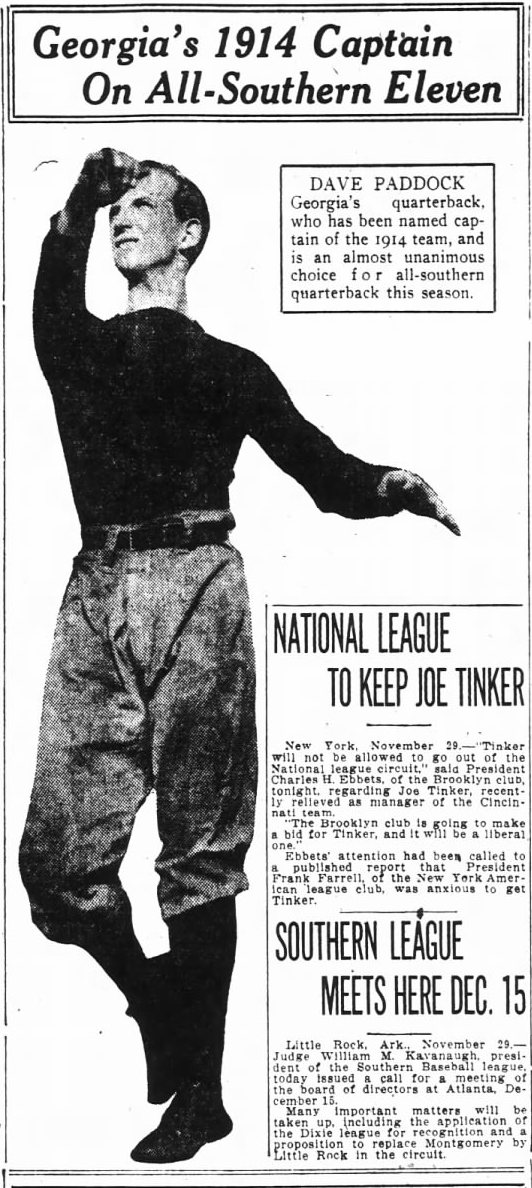
Paddock in the Atlanta Constitution.

=== 1912 ===
Paddock went unnoticed his freshman year at halfback, until he was moved to the quarterback position in the game with Georgia Tech and led the Bulldogs to a 20 to 0 victory.

=== 1914 ===
Paddock was captain of the 1914 team, described as "the star offensive man of the team." He earned All-American honors in 1914. Paddock was the school's second ever All-American after Bob McWhorter.

Parke H. Davis in selecting Paddock All-American wrote, "Thus the greatest quarterback the south has known in years has figured little in the public prints of the north, yet here is a man who has played quarterback as steadily as Logan, as brilliantly as Barrett, and who has excelled each by combining the talents of both. This man is Paddock, of Georgia, to whom is given the position as quarterback upon this mythical all-American team."

== Cornell University ==
Supposedly he spent one year at Cornell University, but was overlooked for its football team.
