= Bob McWhorter =

American college football player and politician

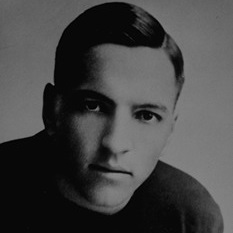
- Bob McWhorter College Hall of Fame photo

No. 36
- Position: Halfback

Personal information
- Born: June 4, 1891; Lexington, Georgia, U.S.
- Died: June 29, 1960 (aged 69); Athens, Georgia, U.S.
- Listed height: 5 ft 10 in (1.78 m)
- Listed weight: 180 lb (82 kg)

Career information
- College: Gordon (1909); Georgia (1910–1913)

Awards and highlights
- First-team All-American (1913); 4× All-Southern (1910–1913); AP Southeast All-Time team (1869–1919 era); Georgia Sports Hall of Fame (1964)
- College Football Hall of Fame (Class of 1954)

Robert Ligon McWhorter (June 4, 1891 – June 29, 1960) played football and baseball at the University of Georgia.

== Early life ==
Bob McWhorter was born on June 4, 1891 in Lexington, Georgia.

=== Gordon ===
McWhorter attended Gordon Military College in Barnesville, Georgia. He played football and baseball there under coach Alex Cunningham. Their baseball team came up to Athens, Georgia and won 11–0. University of Georgia (UGA) athletic chairman Dr. S. V. Sanford hired Cunningham that same day, and McWhorter followed.

== University of Georgia ==
He was a member of Chi Phi fraternity, Phi Kappa Literary Society, and Phi Beta Kappa at the University of Georgia. In his senior year, McWhorter was the captain of both the baseball and football teams,

=== Football ===
As a halfback, he scored 61 touchdowns from 1910 to 1913. In 1913, McWhorter became UGA’s first All-American when he was selected by Parke H. Davis. Sportswriter Dick Jemison said "When you mention football to an Athens fan its definition is Bob McWhorter, and vice-versa." During the First World War, McWhorter was captain of the 1917 Camp Gordon football team.

==== Legacy ====
In 1915, McWhorter was the last selected for Heisman's 30 greatest Southern football players. He made an all-time Georgia Bulldogs football team picked in 1935. Bob McWhorter was inducted into the College Football Hall of Fame in 1954. He was inducted in the Georgia Sports Hall of Fame in 1964. McWhorter was chosen for an Associated Press Southeast Area All-Time football team 1869–1919 era.

=== Baseball ===
Although he was offered a professional baseball contract, he instead chose to study law at the University of Virginia.

== Attorney ==
After becoming an attorney, he returned to Athens, Georgia to practice law. He was a four-term mayor of Athens (1940–1947) and a law professor at Georgia from 1923 to 1958. He died in Athens, on June 29, 1960, at the age of 69.

== See also ==
- List of mayors of Athens, Georgia
