= Alonzo Carroll =

American football player (1894–1962)

Goat Carroll
No. 8
- Position: End

Personal information
- Born: October 3, 1894; Nashville, Tennessee, U.S.
- Died: August 25, 1962 (aged 67); Memphis, Tennessee, U.S.
- Listed weight: 165 lb (75 kg)

Career information
- High school: Wallace University School
- College: Tennessee (1911–1914)

Awards and highlights
- SIAA championship (1914); All-Southern (1914)

Alonzo Marcellus "Goat" Carroll Jr. (October 3, 1894 – August 25, 1962) was a college football player.

== University of Tennessee ==
=== 1914 ===
Carroll was a prominent end for the Tennessee Volunteers of the University of Tennessee, a member of its SIAA champion 1914 team. It was the first championship of any kind for the Tennessee program. Winning all nine of their games, the 1914 squad was only the second undefeated team in Tennessee history. The 1914 Vols were retroactively awarded a national championship by 1st-N-Goal, though this remains largely unrecognized. He scored all the points in the 16 to 14 victory over Vanderbilt in 1914. An account of the first touchdown reads, "Four minutes of play had barely drifted by when Tennessee's weird, mystic, elusive forward pass, May to Carroll, deadly in accuracy, went sailing home for the first touchdown of the game. The chesty Tennessee quarterback sent the oval whizzing for a distance of thirty-five yards and Carroll gathered in the ball near his goal line, when he hurried beneath the posts with all the speed at his command." Carroll was selected All-Southern.
