= Boozer Pitts =

American football player and coach (1893–1971)

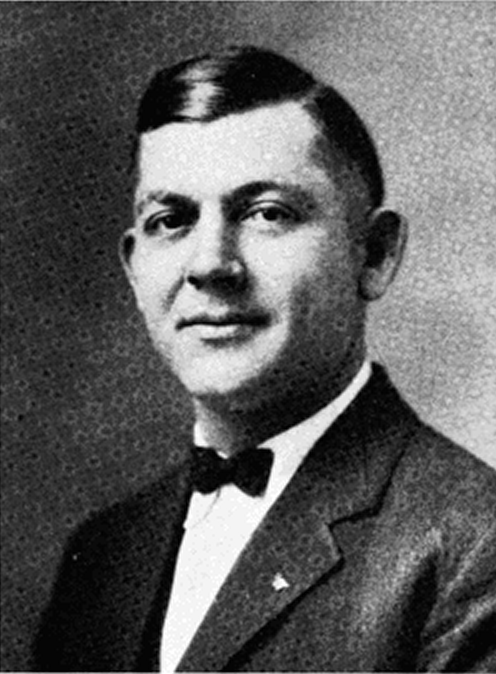
- Pitts pictured in The 1925 Glomerata, Auburn yearbook

Biographical details
- Born: November 25, 1893; Pittsview, Alabama, U.S.
- Died: February 10, 1971 (aged 77); Auburn, Alabama, U.S.

Playing career
- 1913–1914: Auburn
- Position: Center

Coaching career (HC unless noted)
- 1919–1922: Auburn (assistant)
- 1923–1924: Auburn
- 1925–1927: Auburn (assistant)
- 1927: Auburn

Head coaching record
- Overall: 7–11–6

John Emmett "Boozer" Pitts Sr. (November 25, 1893 – February 10, 1971) was an American football player and coach. He served as the head football coach at Auburn University from 1923 to 1924 and again for the final seven games of the 1927 season, compiling a career record of 7–11–6. From 1913 to 1915, he was a math assistant instructor. He was also a professor of mathematics at Auburn from 1919 to 1956.

== Playing career ==
A native of Pittsview, Alabama, Pitts was a prominent center for coach Mike Donahue's Auburn Tigers football team in 1913 and 1914. He entered Auburn at the age of 15, having only read about football. Pitts was selected All-Southern and was a member of an All-time Auburn Tigers football team selected in 1935, as well as coach Donahue's all-time Auburn team. One writer claims "Auburn had a lot of great football teams, but there may not have been one greater than the 1913–1914 team." Pitts weighed some 190 pounds.

== Army ==
Pitts later served as a colonel in the United States Army during World War II. In late 1958, he had his larynx removed during surgery for cancer. One of his sons, John E. Pitts, Jr. was a brigadier general in the United States Air Force.

== Head coaching record ==
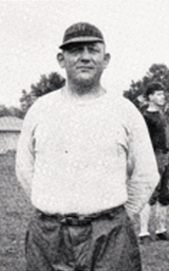
Pitts in 1928

Year	Team	Overall	Conference	Standing	Bowl/playoffs
Auburn Tigers (Southern Conference) (1923–1924)
1923	Auburn	3–3–3	0–1–3	14th	
1924	Auburn	4–4–1	2–4–1	17th	
Auburn Tigers (Southern Conference) (1927)
1927	Auburn	0–4–2 (Note: Dave Morey coached the first three games of the season.)	0–4–1	22nd	
Auburn:		7–11–6	2–9–5		
Total:		7–11–6			

== See also ==
- List of college football head coaches with non-consecutive tenure

== Selected works ==
- Pitts, John E. (1968). Thoughts of a Man Called Boozer. Carlton Press.
