= 7–2–2 defense =

American football defensive formation

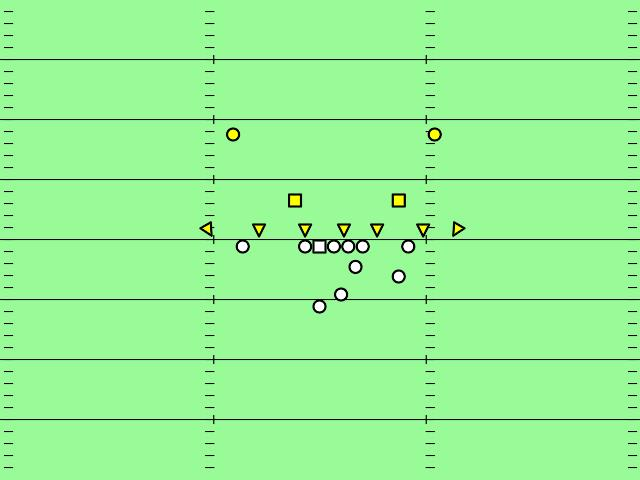
7–2–2, as played in the 1936 Alabama–Mississippi State game

The 7–2–2 defense or seven-box defense, used seven "down linemen", or players on the line of scrimmage at the time of the snap, two linebackers, and two safeties. Amos Alonzo Stagg invented the seven-box defense in 1890 at Springfield College. At that time, most teams were using a nine-man line on defense, and there were only three downs and no forward passes. The 7–2–2 was the base defense used by Knute Rockne at Notre Dame, as well as Mike Donahue at Auburn. Into the late 1930s, the 7–2–2 was still commonly employed inside the defender's thirty-yard line. It was considered "very strong against a running attack, but rather weak defensively against passes." The 7–2–2 was also employed when the opponent was expected to punt.

== Background ==
The 1906 football rule reforms mandated that offenses use at least seven down linemen. These players usually stood shoulder-to-shoulder before the snap, a posture defenses tended to match. The defenses of the time are considered unsophisticated by today's standards. The interior defensive linemen were expected to hold their ground against their assigned blockers, while the responsibility of disrupting the offense rested primarily with the tackles and ends, especially those lined up on the "strong" side of the opposing line.

Over time, however, as new offensive formations, such as the single wing, were introduced, and increased the lateral running and passing threats, the seven man front changed in character. Box and letter drawings of the seven man front, by coaches such as Bernie Bierman and Steve Owen show a broadly spread front, with the center and two guards versus the interior five offensive linemen, defensive tackles 2–5 yards from the guards, and ends 2–5 yards outside the defensive tackles, and well outside the offensive ends.

Improvements in offensive blocking schemes eventually made the seven-man line defenses vulnerable, but it remained a common formation, particularly against opponents with an unreliable passing attack, even into the 1950s. The abolition of the one-platoon system at all levels of the game by the 1960s effectively ended use of 7-man fronts except in goal-line situations; free substitution thus allowed bulkier offensive linemen to be taken out and replaced by nimbler linebackers, giving defenses more flexibility.

The 3-4 defense can be seen as a modern variant of the 7-man defensive front (specifically the 7–2–2), with the cornerbacks (ends), outside linebackers (tackles), "defensive ends" (guards) and the nose tackle (center) all lined up roughly on the line of scrimmage. The key difference is in the spacing of the line (the linebackers and defensive ends are spread much wider than in the original 7-man front) and the fact that the outside linebackers and cornerbacks usually stand upright instead of crouching into a three-point stance.
