= Mike Donahue =

American athlete, coach, and college athletics administrator

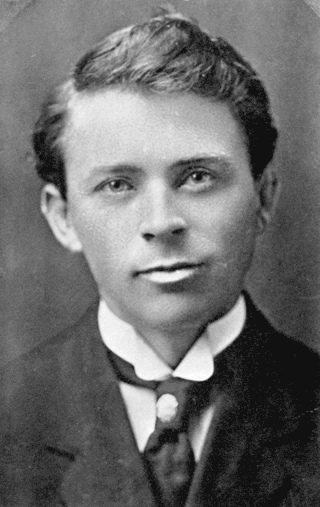
- Donahue at Auburn in 1909

Biographical details
- Born: June 14, 1876; County Kerry, Ireland
- Died: December 11, 1960 (aged 84); Baton Rouge, Louisiana, U.S.

Playing career

Football
- 1899–1903: Yale
- Position: Quarterback

Coaching career (HC unless noted)

Football
- 1904–1906: Auburn
- 1908–1922: Auburn
- 1923–1927: LSU
- 1931–1932: Spring Hill (assistant)
- 1934: Spring Hill
- 1935–1936: Spring Hill (freshmen)

Basketball
- 1905–1921: Auburn

Baseball
- 1925–1926: LSU

Tennis
- 1946–1947: LSU

Golf
- 1944–1945: LSU

Administrative career (AD unless noted)
- 1921–1922: Auburn
- 1923–1927: LSU
- 1929–1936: Spring Hill
- 1937–1948: LSU (intramural director)

Head coaching record
- Overall: 133–59–8 (football); 72–81 (basketball); 15–15–3 (baseball); 0–7 (tennis)

Accomplishments and honors

Championships
- Football; 3 National Championships (1910,1913,1914); 6 SIAA (1904, 1908, 1910, 1913, 1914, 1919)
- College Football Hall of Fame; Inducted in 1951 (profile)

Michael Joseph "Iron Mike" Donahue (June 14, 1876 – December 11, 1960) was an Irish-American football player, coach of football, basketball, baseball, tennis, track, soccer, and golf, and a college athletics administrator. He served as the head football coach at Auburn University (1904–1906, 1908–1922), at Louisiana State University (1923–1927), and at Spring Hill College (1934).

In 18 seasons coaching football at Auburn, Donahue amassed a record of 106–35–5 and had three squads go undefeated with four more suffering only one loss. His .743 career winning percentage is the second highest in Auburn history, surpassing notable coaches such as John Heisman and Ralph "Shug" Jordan. Donahue Drive in Auburn, Alabama, on which Jordan–Hare Stadium is located and the Tiger Walk takes place, is named in his honor, as is Mike Donahue Drive on the LSU campus.

Donahue also coached basketball (1905–1921), baseball, track, and soccer (1912–?) at Auburn and baseball (1925–1926) and tennis (1946–1947) at LSU. He was inducted as a coach into the College Football Hall of Fame as part of its inaugural class in 1951.

== Early life ==
Donahue was born in County Kerry, Ireland and attended Yale University. There he lettered in football, basketball, track and cross country. Donahue played as a substitute quarterback on the football team, and was twice captain of the scrub team. He graduated in 1903. Donahue stood just 5'4" tall, with red hair and blue eyes.

== Coaching career ==
=== Auburn ===
Upon graduating college, Donahue became the tenth head coach of the Auburn Tigers football team beginning in 1904, the same year Vanderbilt hired Dan McGugin. Former Auburn head coach Billy Watkins led the effort to acquire Donahue. Contrasting with McGugin, Fuzzy Woodruff wrote that Donahue was "a mouse-like little man with little to say, save when aroused, on which he was capable of utterances of great fire and fervor." His teams were led by his 7–2–2 defense.

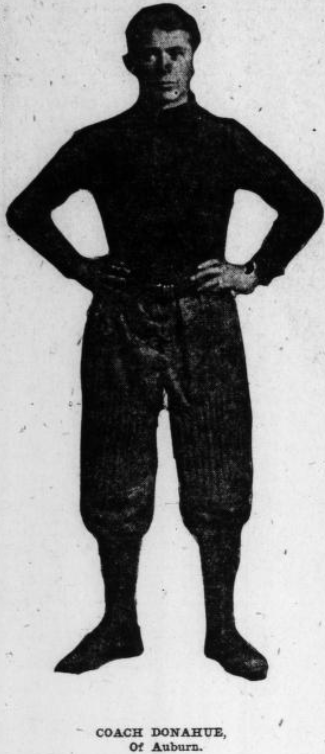
Donahue, c. 1906

His coaching career saw immediate success, as his first team went undefeated at 5–0 including a defeat of rival Alabama which was the purpose for his hiring. Donahue's Auburn teams won six Southern Intercollegiate Athletic Association titles, in 1904, 1908, 1910, 1913, 1914 and 1919.

Donahue's 1913 and 1914 teams went undefeated, with the 1914 squad allowing zero points to be scored all year, and have been recognized as national champions by various, retroactive selectors including Billingsley Report and the Howell Ratings. From 1913 into 1915, Auburn went 22 consecutive games without a loss. One source on the 1913 team reads "Coach Donahue loved the fullback dive and would run the play over and over again before sending the elusive Newell wide on a sweep."

Donahue's 1920 team averaged a then-school record 36.9 points per game. His last team was considered one of the best teams Auburn turned out in the first half of the 20th century. (Note: Donahue named an all-time Auburn team: Robbie Robinson, Pete Bonner, Tubby Lockwood, Boozer Pitts, Big Thigpen, Noisy Grisham, Slick Moulton, Kirk Newell, Ed Shirling, John Shirey, and Moon Ducote.)

His .743 career winning percentage is the second highest in Auburn history, surpassing notable coaches including John Heisman, Ralph "Shug" Jordan, Pat Dye, Terry Bowden, and Tommy Tuberville.

Donahue also served as athletic director, basketball coach, baseball coach, track coach, and soccer coach while at Auburn. In 1905, he initiated the school's first official varsity basketball team, which went 3–1–1, including victories over Georgia Tech and Tulane, a two-point loss to the Columbus (Georgia) All-Stars, and a tie with the Birmingham Athletic Club. Under Donahue, basketball practice was a contact sport; a former player once lamented, "He never bothered calling fouls--said it slowed up the game."

In 1912, Donahue coached Auburn's first soccer team. By the beginning of the 1915 season, Auburn was only playing athletic clubs and prep schools and had yet to participate in an intercollegiate match, due to a lack of soccer programs at other Southern colleges.

Donahue resigned in December 1922, citing threats from the Ku Klux Klan, who did not want a Roman Catholic as the college's athletic director.

=== LSU ===
Donahue went on to become the seventeenth head football coach at LSU in 1923 and had a 23–19–3 record over five seasons. The 1924 team beat Indiana. The 1927 team tied Wallace Wade's Alabama Crimson Tide. He signed a six-year extension as football coach and athletic director after the 1927 season, but retired from coaching two months later.

He also served briefly as the head coach of the LSU Tigers baseball team (1925–1926), compiling a record of 15–15–3, and as the head men's tennis coach at LSU (1946–1947), tallying a mark of 0–7. In 1944 and 1945, Donahue served as the head coach of the LSU Tigers golf team.

=== Spring Hill ===
Donahue served as the athletic director at Spring Hill College from 1929 to 1936. In 1931, Donahue assisted Pat Browne with the football team at Spring Hill. In 1934, Donahue reentered the active coaching ranks, when he was hired as head coach and mentored his son, Mike, Jr.

== Death and legacy ==
Donahue died on December 11, 1960, in Baton Rouge, Louisiana.

== Head coaching record ==
=== Football ===
Year	Team	Overall	Conference	Standing	Bowl/playoffs
Auburn Tigers (Southern Intercollegiate Athletic Association) (1904–1906)
1904	Auburn	5–0	4–0	T–1st	
1905	Auburn	2–4	2–4	9th	
1906	Auburn	1–5–1	0–5	16th	
Auburn Tigers (Southern Intercollegiate Athletic Association) (1908–1921)
1908	Auburn	6–1	5–1	T–1st	
1909	Auburn	5–2	3–2	6th	
1910	Auburn	6–1	6–0	T–1st	
1911	Auburn	4–2–1	3–0–1	2nd	
1912	Auburn	6–1–1	4–1–1	3rd	
1913	Auburn	8–0	7–0	1st	
1914	Auburn	8–0–1	5–0–1	T–1st	
1915	Auburn	6–2	4–2	7th	
1916	Auburn	6–2	5–2	6th	
1917	Auburn	6–2–1	5–1	T–2nd	
1918	Auburn	2–5	0–2	11th	
1919	Auburn	8–1	5–1	T–1st	
1920	Auburn	7–2	3–2	8th	
1921	Auburn	5–3	3–2	9th	
Auburn Tigers (Southern Conference) (1922)
1922	Auburn	8–2	2–1	T–6th	
Auburn:		99–35–5	65–26–3		
LSU Tigers (Southern Conference) (1923–1927)
1923	LSU	3–5–1	0–3	19th	
1924	LSU	5–4	0–3	T–19th	
1925	LSU	5–3–1	0–2–1	T–17th	
1926	LSU	6–3	3–3	T–10th	
1927	LSU	4–4–1	2–3–1	11th	
LSU:		23–19–3	5–14–2		
Spring Hill Badgers (Dixie Conference) (1934)
1934	Spring Hill	4–5	0–4	9th	
Spring Hill:		4–5	0–4		
Total:		133–59–8			
National championship Conference title Conference division title or championship game berth

=== Basketball ===
Record table
Season	Team	Overall	Conference	Standing	Postseason
Auburn Tigers (SIAA) (1905–1921)
1905–06	Auburn	5–1–1		1st	
1906–07	Auburn	4–2			
1907–08	Auburn	6–5			
1908–09	Auburn	4–3			
1909–10	Auburn	11–6			
1910–11	Auburn	3–5			
1911–12	Auburn	2–6			
1912–13	Auburn	6–9			
1913–14	Auburn	3–10			
1914–15	Auburn	3–5			
1915–16	Auburn	3–5			
1916–17	Auburn	2–2			
1917–18	Auburn	2–3			
1918–19	Auburn	4–3			
1919–20	Auburn	11–7			
1920–21	Auburn	5–8			
Auburn:		72–81 (.471)			
Total:		72–81 (.471)			

=== Baseball ===
Record table
Season	Team	Overall	Conference	Standing	Postseason
LSU Tigers (Southern Conference) (1925–1926)
1925	LSU	5–9–2			
1926	LSU	10–6–1			
LSU:		15–15–3 (.500)			
Total:		15–15–3 (.500)			

== See also ==
- List of college football head coaches with non-consecutive tenure

== Bibliography ==
- Woodruff, Fuzzy (1928). A History of Southern Football 1890–1928. Vol. 1.
