= 1930 Southern Conference football season =

- League: NCAA
- Sport: College football
- Duration: September 20, 1930 through January 1, 1931
- Teams: 23

Regular Season
- Season champions: Alabama; Tulane

Football seasons
- 1929 1931

1930 Southern Conference football standings
	Conf.					Overall
Team	W		L		T	W		L		T
No. 3 Alabama +	8	–	0	–	0	10	–	0	–	0
No. 11 Tulane +	5	–	0	–	0	8	–	1	–	0
No. 10 Tennessee	6	–	1	–	0	9	–	1	–	0
Duke	4	–	1	–	1	8	–	1	–	2
Vanderbilt	5	–	2	–	0	8	–	2	–	0
Maryland	4	–	2	–	0	7	–	5	–	0
Florida	4	–	2	–	1	6	–	3	–	1
North Carolina	4	–	2	–	2	5	–	3	–	2
Clemson	3	–	2	–	0	8	–	2	–	0
Georgia	3	–	2	–	1	7	–	2	–	1
Kentucky	4	–	3	–	0	5	–	3	–	0
South Carolina	4	–	3	–	0	6	–	4	–	0
VPI	2	–	3	–	1	5	–	3	–	1
Mississippi A&M	2	–	3	–	0	2	–	7	–	0
Georgia Tech	2	–	4	–	1	2	–	6	–	1
LSU	2	–	4	–	0	6	–	4	–	0
Virginia	2	–	5	–	0	4	–	6	–	0
Sewanee	1	–	4	–	0	3	–	6	–	1
NC State	1	–	5	–	0	2	–	8	–	0
Ole Miss	1	–	5	–	0	3	–	5	–	1
Auburn	1	–	6	–	0	3	–	7	–	0
Washington and Lee	0	–	4	–	1	3	–	6	–	1
VMI	0	–	5	–	0	3	–	6	–	0
+ – Conference co-champions; Rankings from Dickinson System

The 1930 Southern Conference football season was the college football games played by the member schools of the Southern Conference as part of the 1930 college football season. The season began on September 20.

In the annual Rose Bowl game, the SoCon champion Alabama Crimson Tide defeated the PCC champion Washington State 24–0 and claims a national championship. It was Wallace Wade's last year as Alabama head coach.

Tulane was also co-champion. Times-Picayune sports writer Pete Baird called the 1930 squad "the best team that ever represented the Olive and Blue".

== Regular season ==
Index to colors and formatting
Non-conference matchup; SoCon member won
Non-conference matchup; SoCon member lost
Non-conference matchup; tie
Conference matchup

SoCon teams in bold.

=== Week One ===
Date	Visiting team	Home team	Site	Result	Attendance	Reference
September 20	Presbyterian	Clemson	Riggs Field • Calhoun, South Carolina	**W** 28–7		
September 20	Dakota Wesleyan	LSU	Tiger Stadium • Baton Rouge, Louisiana	**W** 76–0		
September 20	High Point	NC State	Riddick Stadium • Raleigh, North Carolina	**W** 34–0		
September 20	Jacksonville State	Sewanee	Hardee Field • Sewanee, Tennessee	**W** 25–0		
September 20	Erskine	South Carolina	Melton Field • Columbia, South Carolina	**W** 19–0	4,000	
September 20	Roanoke	Virginia	Lambeth Field • Charlottesville, Virginia	**W** 37–0		
September 20	Randolph–Macon	Washington & Lee	Wilson Field • Lexington, Virginia	**W** 32–0		

=== Week Two ===
Date	Visiting team	Home team	Site	Result	Attendance	Reference
September 26	Birmingham–Southern	Auburn	Cramton Bowl • Montgomery, Alabama	**L** 7–0	9,000	
September 26	Union (TN)	Ole Miss	Hemingway Stadium • Oxford, Mississippi	**W** 64–0		
September 27	Howard (AL)	Alabama	Denny Stadium • Tuscaloosa, Alabama	**W** 43–0	6,000	
September 27	Wofford	Clemson	Riggs Field • Calhoun, South Carolina	**W** 32–0		
September 27	Southern College	Florida	Fleming Field • Gainesville, Florida	**W** 45–6		
September 27	Oglethorpe	Georgia	Sanford Stadium • Athens, Georgia	**W** 31–6		
September 27	Louisiana Tech	LSU	Tiger Stadium • Baton Rouge, Louisiana	**W** 71–0		
September 27	Washington College	Maryland	Byrd Stadium • College Park, Maryland	**W** 60–6	3,000	
September 27	Southwestern (TN)	Mississippi A&M	Scott Field • Starkville, Mississippi	**L** 14–0		
September 27	Wake Forest	North Carolina	Kenan Memorial Stadium • Chapel Hill, North Carolina	**W** 13–7	8,000	
September 27	Davidson	NC State	World War Memorial Stadium • Greensboro, North Carolina	**L** 12–0		
September 27	Tennessee Tech	Sewanee	Hardee Field • Sewanee, Tennessee	**W** 14–0		
September 27	**South Carolina**	Duke	Duke Stadium • Durham, North Carolina	**SCAR** 22–0		
September 27	Maryville (TN)	Tennessee	Shields–Watkins Field • Knoxville, Tennessee	**W** 54–0		
September 27	Southwestern Louisiana	Tulane	Tulane Stadium • New Orleans, Louisiana	**W** 84–0	15,000	
September 27	Chattanooga	Vanderbilt	Dudley Field • Nashville, Tennessee	**W** 39–0		
September 27	Randolph–Macon	Virginia	Lambeth Field • Charlottesville, Virginia	**W** 48–0		
September 27	Richmond	VMI	Alumni Field • Lexington, Virginia	**W** 12–0		
September 27	Roanoke	VPI	Miles Stadium • Blacksburg, Virginia	**W** 9–0		
September 27	Hampden–Sydney	Washington & Lee	Stadium Field • Lynchburg, Virginia	**W** 15–0		

=== Week Three ===
Date	Visiting team	Home team	Site	Result	Attendance	Reference
October 3	The Citadel	**Clemson**	Florence Memorial Stadium • Florence, South Carolina	**W** 13–7	5,000	
October 4	**Ole Miss**	**Alabama**	Denny Stadium • Tuscaloosa, Alabama	**ALA** 64–0		
October 4	Spring Hill	**Auburn**	Drake Field • Auburn, Alabama	**W** 13–0		
October 4	**NC State**	**Florida**	Plant Field • Tampa, Florida	**FLA** 27–0	10,000	
October 4	Mercer	**Georgia**	Sanford Field • Athens, Georgia	**W** 51–0		
October 4	**South Carolina**	**Georgia Tech**	Grant Field • Atlanta, Georgia	**GT** 45–0	25,000	
October 4	**Sewanee**	**Kentucky**	Stoll Field • Lexington, Kentucky	**UK** 37–0	9,000	
October 4	Southwestern Louisiana	**LSU**	Tiger Stadium • Baton Rouge, Louisiana	**W** 85–0		
October 4	**Maryland**	Yale	Yale Bowl • New Haven, Connecticut	**L** 40–13	50,000	
October 4	**Mississippi A&M**	Mississippi College	Municipal Stadium • Jackson, Mississippi	**L** 13–12		
October 4	**North Carolina**	**VPI**	Miles Stadium • Blacksburg, Virginia	**UNC** 39–21	5,000	
October 4	**Tulane**	Northwestern	Dyche Stadium • Evanston, IL	**L** 14–0	25,000	
October 4	Centre	**Tennessee**	Shields–Watkins Field • Knoxville, Tennessee	**W** 18–0		
October 4	**Vanderbilt**	Minnesota	Memorial Stadium • Minneapolis, Minnesota	**W** 33–7	20,000	
October 4	**Virginia**	**Duke**	Duke Stadium • Durham, North Carolina	**DUKE** 32–0		
October 4	St. John's (MD)	**VMI**	Alumni Field • Lexington, Virginia	**W** 6–0		
October 4	**Washington & Lee**	Richmond	City Stadium • Richmond, Virginia	**W** 14–0	4,000	

=== Week Four ===
Date	Visiting team	Home team	Site	Result	Attendance	Reference
October 11	**Sewanee**	**Alabama**	Legion Field • Birmingham, Alabama	**ALA** 25–0		
October 11	**Clemson**	**NC State**	Central High School Stadium • Charlotte, North Carolina	**CLEM** 27–0	7,000	
October 11	**Auburn**	**Florida**	Fairfield Stadium • Jacksonville, Florida	**FLA** 7–0		
October 11	Davidson	**Duke**	Duke Stadium • Durham, North Carolina	**W** 12–0		
October 11	**Georgia**	Yale	Yale Bowl • New Haven, Connecticut	**W** 18–14	45,000	
October 11	**Maryland**	**North Carolina**	Kenan Memorial Stadium • Chapel Hill, North Carolina	**UNC**28–21	9,000	
October 11	**Georgia Tech**	Carnegie Tech	Pitt Stadium • Pittsburgh, Pennsylvania	**L** 31–0	40,000	
October 11	Maryville	**Kentucky**	Stoll Field • Lexington, Kentucky	**W**57–0		
October 11	**LSU**	**South Carolina**	Melton Field • Columbia, South Carolina	**SCAR** 7–6		
October 11	Millsaps	**Mississippi A&M**	Scott Field • Starkville, Mississippi	**L** 19–13		
October 11	**Ole Miss**	**Tennessee**	Shields–Watkins Field • Knoxville, Tennessee	**TENN**27–0		
October 11	**Tulane**	Texas A&M	Fair Park Stadium • Dallas, Texas	**W**19–9		
October 11	**VPI**	**Vanderbilt**	Dudley Field • Nashville, Tennessee	**VAN**40–0		
October 11	**Virginia**	Penn	Franklin Field • Philadelphia, Pennsylvania	**L**40–6		
October 11	**VMI**	The Citadel	Johnson Hagood Stadium • Charleston, South Carolina	**L**7–6		
October 11	**Washington & Lee**	West Virginia	Laidley Field • Charleston, West Virginia	**L**3–13	14,000	

=== Week Five ===
Date	Visiting team	Home team	Site	Result	Attendance	Reference
October 16	Wake Forest	**NC State**	Riddick Stadium • Raleigh, North Carolina	**L** 7–0		
October 17	Newberry	**Clemson**	Riggs Field • Calhoun, South Carolina	**W** 75–0		
October 18	**Tennessee**	**Alabama**	Denny Stadium • Tuscaloosa, Alabama	**ALA** 18–6	18,000	
October 18	**Auburn**	**Georgia Tech**	Grant Field • Atlanta, Georgia	**GT** 14–12		
October 18	**Duke**	Navy	Thompson Stadium • Annapolis, Maryland	**W** 18–0		
October 18	**Florida**	Chicago	Stagg Field • Chicago, Illinois	**W** 19–0	10,000	
October 18	**North Carolina**	**Georgia**	Sanford Stadium • Athens, Georgia	**UGA** 26–0	15,000	
October 18	**LSU**	**Mississippi A&M**	Municipal Stadium • Jackson, Mississippi	**MSA&M** 8–6		
October 18	St. John's (MD)	**Maryland**	Byrd Stadium • College Park, Maryland	**W** 21–13	3,500	
October 18	**Sewanee**	**Ole Miss**	Hemingway Stadium • Oxford, Mississippi	**SEW** 13–7		
October 18	Birmingham–Southern	**Tulane**	Tulane Stadium • New Orleans, Louisiana	**W** 21–0	12,000	
October 18	Spring Hill	**Vanderbilt**	Dudley Field • Nashville, Tennessee	**W** 27–6		
October 18	**Virginia**	**VMI**	Alumni Field • Lexington, Virginia	**UVA** 13–0		
October 18	William & Mary	**VPI**	City Stadium • Richmond, Virginia	**W** 7–0	8,000	
October 18	**Washington & Lee**	**Kentucky**	Stoll Field • Lexington, Kentucky	**UK** 33–14		

=== Week Six ===
Date	Visiting team	Home team	Site	Result	Attendance	Reference
October 23	**Clemson**	**South Carolina**	State Fairgrounds • Columbia, South Carolina	**CLEM** 20–7	15,000	
October 25	**Vanderbilt**	**Alabama**	Legion Field • Birmingham, Alabama	**ALA** 12–7	20,000	
October 25	**Auburn**	**Georgia**	Memorial Stadium • Columbus, Georgia	**UGA** 39–7		
October 25	**Duke**	Wofford	Snyder Field • Spartanburg, South Carolina	**W** 14–0		
October 25	Furman	**Florida**	Fleming Field • Gainesville, Florida	**L** 14–13		
October 25	**Tulane**	**Georgia Tech**	Grant Field • Atlanta, Georgia	**TUL** 28–0		
October 25	**Virginia**	**Kentucky**	Stoll Field • Lexington, Kentucky	**UK** 47–0		
October 25	**Sewanee**	**LSU**	Tiger Stadium • Baton Rouge, Louisiana	**LSU** 12–0		
October 25	**Maryland**	**VMI**	City Stadium • Richmond, Virginia	**MD** 20–0		
October 25	**Ole Miss**	Chicago	Stagg Field • Chicago, Illinois	**T** 0–0		
October 25	**North Carolina**	**Tennessee**	Shields–Watkins Field • Knoxville, Tennessee	**TENN** 9–7	18,000	
October 25	**Mississippi A&M**	**NC State**	Riddick Stadium • Raleigh, North Carolina	**NCST** 14–0		
October 25	**VPI**	Davidson	Richardson Field • Davidson, North Carolina	**W** 20–19		
October 25	St. John's (MD)	**Washington & Lee**	Wilson Field • Lexington, Virginia	**L** 7–0		

=== Week Seven ===
Date	Visiting team	Home team	Site	Result	Attendance	Reference
October 30	**South Carolina**	The Citadel	County Fairgrounds • Orangeburg, South Carolina	**W** 13–0	6,500	
November 1	**Alabama**	**Kentucky**	Stoll Field • Lexington, Kentucky	**ALA** 19–0	22,000	
November 1	Wofford	**Auburn**	Drake Field • Auburn, Alabama	**W** 38–6		
November 1	**Duke**	Villanova	Philadelphia Municipal Stadium • Philadelphia, Pennsylvania	**W** 12–6		
November 1	**Florida**	**Georgia**	Municipal Stadium • Savannah, Georgia	**T** 0–0		
November 1	**Georgia Tech**	**North Carolina**	Kenan Memorial Stadium • Chapel Hill, North Carolina	**T** 6–6	22,000	
November 1	Arkansas	**LSU**	State Fair Stadium • Shreveport, Louisiana	**W** 27–12		
November 1	**Maryland**	**Virginia**	Lambeth Field • Charlottesville, Virginia	**MD** 14–6		
November 1	**Mississippi A&M**	**Tulane**	Tulane Stadium • New Orleans, Louisiana	**TUL** 53–0		
November 1	**Ole Miss**	**Vanderbilt**	Dudley Field • Nashville, Tennessee	**VAN** 24–0		
November 1	**Sewanee**	Rice	Rice Field • Houston, Texas	**L** 12–0		
November 1	Davidson	**VMI**	Alumni Field • Lexington, Virginia	**W** 6–0		
November 1	**VPI**	**Washington & Lee**	Wilson Field • Lexington, Virginia	**T** 0–0	4,000	

=== Week Eight ===
Date	Visiting team	Home team	Site	Result	Attendance	Reference
November 7	**NC State**	**North Carolina**	Kenan Memorial Stadium • Chapel Hill, North Carolina	**UNC** 13–6		
November 8	**Alabama**	**Florida**	Florida Field • Gainesville, Florida	**ALA** 20–0	18,000	
November 8	**Auburn**	**Tulane**	Tulane Stadium • New Orleans, Louisiana	**TUL** 21–0		
November 8	**Clemson**	**VMI**	Bain Field • Norfolk, Virginia	**CLEM** 32–0		
November 8	**Georgia**	NYU	Polo Grounds • New York	**W** 7–6	45,000	
November 8	**Vanderbilt**	**Georgia Tech**	Grant Field • Atlanta, Georgia	**VAN** 6–0	25,000	
November 8	**Kentucky**	**Duke**	Duke Stadium • Durham, North Carolina	**DUKE** 14–7		
November 8	**Ole Miss**	**LSU**	Tiger Stadium • Baton Rouge, Louisiana	**LSU** 6–0		
November 8	Henderson State	**Mississippi A&M**	Scott Field • Starkville, Mississippi	**L** 25–7		
November 8	**Sewanee**	Chattanooga	Chamberlain Field • Chattanooga, Tennessee	**T** 0–0		
November 8	Carson–Newman	**Tennessee**	Shields–Watkins Field • Knoxville, Tennessee	**W** 34–0		
November 8	**Virginia**	**VPI**	Miles Stadium • Blacksburg, Virginia	**VPI** 34–13		
November 8	**Washington & Lee**	**Maryland**	Byrd Stadium • College Park, Maryland	**MD** 41–7	6,000	

=== Week Nine ===
Date	Visiting team	Home team	Site	Result	Attendance	Reference
November 14	Southwestern (TN)	**Ole Miss**	Hemingway Stadium • Oxford, Mississippi	**W** 37–6		
November 15	**LSU**	**Alabama**	Cramton Bowl • Montgomery, Alabama	**ALA** 33–0	5,000	
November 15	**Mississippi A&M**	**Auburn**	Legion Field • Birmingham, Alabama	**MSA&M** 7–6		
November 15	**Clemson**	**Florida**	Fairfield Stadium • Jacksonville, Florida	**FLA** 27–0		
November 15	**Georgia Tech**	Penn	Franklin Field • Philadelphia, Pennsylvania	**L** 34–7		
November 15	**VMI**	**Kentucky**	Stoll Field • Lexington, Kentucky	**UK** 26–0		
November 15	**VPI**	**Maryland**	Bain Field • Norfolk, Virginia	**MD** 13–7	5,000	
November 15	**North Carolina**	Davidson	Richardson Field • Davidson, North Carolina	**L** 7–6		
November 15	**Duke**	**NC State**	Riddick Stadium • Raleigh, North Carolina	**DUKE** 18–0		
November 15	**Sewanee**	**South Carolina**	Melton Field • Columbia, South Carolina	**SCAR** 14–13	5,000	
November 15	**Georgia**	**Tulane**	Tulane Stadium • New Orleans, Louisiana	**TUL** 25–0	30,000	
November 15	**Tennessee**	**Vanderbilt**	Dudley Field • Nashville, Tennessee	**TENN** 13–0		
November 15	**Washington & Lee**	**Virginia**	Lambeth Field • Charlottesville, Virginia	**UVA** 21–7		

=== Week Ten ===
Date	Visiting team	Home team	Site	Result	Attendance	Reference
November 22	**Duke**	Wake Forest	Gore Field • Wake Forest, North Carolina	**T** 13–13		
November 22	**Maryland**	Navy	Thompson Stadium • Annapolis, Maryland	**L** 6–0	23,000	
November 22	**NC State**	**South Carolina**	Melton Field • Columbia, South Carolina	**SCAR** 19–0	4,000	
November 22	**Auburn**	**Vanderbilt**	Dudley Field • Nashville, Tennessee	**VAN** 27–0	8,000	

=== Week Eleven ===
Date	Visiting team	Home team	Site	Result	Attendance	Reference
November 27	**Georgia**	**Alabama**	Legion Field • Birmingham, Alabama	**ALA** 13–0	28,000	
November 27	**South Carolina**	**Auburn**	Memorial Stadium • Columbus, Georgia	**AUB** 25–7		
November 27	**Clemson**	Furman	Manly Field • Greenville, South Carolina	**W** 12–7	12,000	
November 27	**Florida**	**Georgia Tech**	Grant Field • Atlanta, Georgia	**FLA** 55–7		
November 27	Johns Hopkins	**Maryland**	Byrd Stadium • College Park, Maryland	**W** 39–6	10,000	
November 27	**Ole Miss**	**Mississippi A&M**	Scott Field • Starkville, Mississippi	**MISS** 20–0		
November 27	**Kentucky**	**Tennessee**	Shields–Watkins Field • Knoxville, Tennessee	**TENN** 8–0	25,000	
November 27	**LSU**	**Tulane**	Tulane Stadium • New Orleans, Louisiana	**TUL** 12–7		
November 27	**North Carolina**	**Virginia**	Lambeth Field • Charlottesville, Virginia	**UNC** 41–0	10,000	
November 27	**VMI**	**VPI**	Maher Field • Roanoke, Virginia	**VPI** 24–0		
November 27	**Washington & Lee**	**Duke**	Duke Stadium • Durham, North Carolina	**DUKE** 14–0		
November 29	**Maryland**	**Vanderbilt**	Dudley Field • Nashville, Tennessee	**VAN** 22–7		

=== Week Twelve ===
Date	Visiting team	Home team	Site	Result	Attendance	Reference
December 6	**Georgia**	**Georgia Tech**	Grant Field • Atlanta, Georgia	**UGA** 13–0	27,000	
December 6	**Maryland**	Western Maryland	Municipal Stadium • Baltimore, Maryland	**L** 7–0		
December 6	**Duke**	**North Carolina**	Kenan Memorial Stadium • Chapel Hill, North Carolina	**T** 0–0		
December 6	**Tennessee**	**Florida**	Fairfield Stadium • Jacksonville, Florida	**TENN** 13–6		

== Bowl games ==
Date	Bowl Game	Site	SIAA Team	Opponent	Score
January 1, 1931	Rose Bowl	Rose Bowl • Pasadena, California	Alabama	Washington State	ALA 24–0

== Awards and honors ==
=== All-Americans ===
- E – Jerry Dalrymple, Tulane (AP-3; UP-2; COL-1; INS-2; CP-2; NANA; AAB)
- E – Herb Maffett, Georgia (UP-3; NYEP-1)
- E – Bill Schwartz, Vanderbilt (CP-2)
- T – Fred Sington, Alabama (AP-1; UP-1; COL-1; INS-1; NEA-1; CP-1; NANA; NYEP-1; NYS-1; LAT; AAB)
- T – Vance Maree, Georgia Tech (INS-3)
- T – Foots Clement, Alabama (CP-3)
- G – Ralph Maddox, Georgia (INS-1)
- C – Lloyd Roberts, Tulane (INS-3)
- QB – Bobby Dodd, Tennessee (AP-2; UP-2; COL-1; NEA-1 [hb]; CP-2)
- HB – John Suther, Alabama (AP-3; UP-3; INS-2; CP-1; NYEP-1)
- HB – Red Bethea, Florida (CP-2)
- FB – Jack Roberts, Georgia (INS-3; CP-2)
- FB – Johnny Cain, Alabama (INS-2)

=== All-Southern team ===
The following includes the composite All-Southern team of southern coaches and sports writers compiled by the Associated Press.

Position	Name	First-team selectors	Team
QB	Bobby Dodd	AP, UP	Tennessee
HB	John Suther	AP, UP	Alabama
HB	Buddy Hackman	AP, UP	Tennessee
FB	Jack Roberts	AP, UP	Georgia
E	Jerry Dalrymple	AP, UP	Tulane
T	Fred Sington	AP, UP	Alabama
G	Jimmy Steele	AP, UP	Florida
C	Lloyd Roberts	AP, UP	Tulane
G	Milton Leathers	AP, UP	Georgia
T	Vance Maree	AP	Georgia Tech
E	Vernon "Catfish" Smith	AP	Georgia
