= 1930 Tulane Green Wave football team =

American college football season

1930 Tulane Green Wave football
- 1930 starting lineup

SoCon co-champion
- Conference: Southern Conference
- Record: 8–1 (5–0 SoCon)
- Head coach: Bernie Bierman (4th season)
- Offensive scheme: Single-wing
- Captain: Loyd Roberts
- Home stadium: Tulane Stadium

Uniform
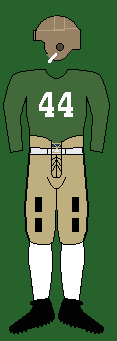

1930 Southern Conference football standings
	Conf.					Overall
Team	W		L		T	W		L		T
No. 3 Alabama +	8	–	0	–	0	10	–	0	–	0
No. 11 Tulane +	5	–	0	–	0	8	–	1	–	0
No. 10 Tennessee	6	–	1	–	0	9	–	1	–	0
Duke	4	–	1	–	1	8	–	1	–	2
Vanderbilt	5	–	2	–	0	8	–	2	–	0
Maryland	4	–	2	–	0	7	–	5	–	0
Florida	4	–	2	–	1	6	–	3	–	1
North Carolina	4	–	2	–	2	5	–	3	–	2
Clemson	3	–	2	–	0	8	–	2	–	0
Georgia	3	–	2	–	1	7	–	2	–	1
Kentucky	4	–	3	–	0	5	–	3	–	0
South Carolina	4	–	3	–	0	6	–	4	–	0
VPI	2	–	3	–	1	5	–	3	–	1
Mississippi A&M	2	–	3	–	0	2	–	7	–	0
Georgia Tech	2	–	4	–	1	2	–	6	–	1
LSU	2	–	4	–	0	6	–	4	–	0
Virginia	2	–	5	–	0	4	–	6	–	0
Sewanee	1	–	4	–	0	3	–	6	–	1
NC State	1	–	5	–	0	2	–	8	–	0
Ole Miss	1	–	5	–	0	3	–	5	–	1
Auburn	1	–	6	–	0	3	–	7	–	0
Washington and Lee	0	–	4	–	1	3	–	6	–	1
VMI	0	–	5	–	0	3	–	6	–	0
+ – Conference co-champions; Rankings from Dickinson System

The 1930 Tulane Green Wave football team was an American football team that represented Tulane University as a member of the Southern Conference (SoCon) during the 1930 Southern Conference football season. In its fourth year under head coach Bernie Bierman, the team compiled an 8–1 record (5–0 in conference games), shared the SoCon title with national champion Alabama, shut out six of nine opponents, and outscored all opponents by a total of 263 to 30. Tulane was ranked No. 11 in the final Dickinson rankings released in December 1930.

Times-Picayune sports writer Pete Baird called the 1930 squad "the best team that ever represented the Olive and Blue". The team's only loss was to Big Ten co-champion Northwestern. Tulane defeated Georgia Tech at Grant Field for the first time. One writer called the Tulane victory over the Georgia Bulldogs "one of the finest games ever played by any Green Wave team in Tulane football history".

End Jerry Dalrymple was chosen as a first-team All-American by Collier's Weekly (Grantland Rice), the All-American Board, and the North American Newspaper Association. He was later inducted into the College Football Hall of Fame.

Four Tulane players received All-Southern honors from the Associated Press or United Press: Dalrymple (AP-1, UP-1), center Lloyd Roberts (AP-1, UP-1), halfback Don Zimmerman (AP-2, UP-2), and guard Maury Bodenger (AP-2)

== Preseason ==
After the end of the previous season, at the annual alumni banquet, center Loyd Roberts was elected captain of the defending SoCon champion Tulane football team.

Head coach Bernie Bierman used a single-wing offense. He faced a challenge with an all-new backfield and the graduation of Bill Banker. This year's backfield would include quarterback Red Dawson, triple-threat halfbacks Wop Glover and Don Zimmerman, and fullback Nollie Felts.

Dawson was a northerner from River Falls, Wisconsin, where line coach Ted Cox had previously coached at River Falls State. Felts had played for Southern Miss and is considered one of the best football players in that school's history. He was already married with a son and studying medicine at Tulane.

On the line, the team consisted of veterans such as ends Dalrymple and Jack Holland, center Roberts and guard Maury Bodenger, and the only newcomer John Scafide. Both Glover and Scafide prepared at Saint Stanislaus College by playing for the "Rock-a-chaws". (Note: Saint Stanislaus College is located about an hour's drive outside New Orleans in Bay Saint Louis, Mississippi.)

== Schedule ==
Date	Time	Opponent	Site	Result	Attendance	Source
September 27		Southwestern Louisiana*	Tulane Stadium; New Orleans, LA	W 84–0	15,000	
October 4		at Northwestern*	Dyche Stadium; Evanston, IL	L 0–14	25,000	
October 11		vs. Texas A&M*	Fair Park Stadium; Dallas, TX	W 19–9	12,000	
October 18	2:30 p. m.	Birmingham–Southern*	Tulane Stadium; New Orleans, LA	W 21–0	12,000	
October 25		at Georgia Tech	Grant Field; Atlanta, GA	W 28–0		
November 1		Mississippi A&M	Tulane Stadium; New Orleans, LA	W 53–0		
November 8		Auburn	Tulane Stadium; New Orleans, LA (rivalry)	W 21–0		
November 15	2:30 p. m.	Georgia	Tulane Stadium; New Orleans, LA	W 25–0	30,000	
November 27	2:30 p. m.	LSU	Tulane Stadium; New Orleans, LA (Battle for the Rag)	W 12–7	25,000–28,000	
*Non-conference game

== Game summaries ==
=== Southwestern Louisiana ===
SW Louisiana at Tulane

Team	1	2	3	4	Total
SW Louisiana	0	0	0	0	0
• Tulane	26	18	20	20	84

- Date: September 27
- Location: New Orleans
- Game attendance: 15,000

15,000 Tulane fans attended the opening day of the 1930 season, September 27. The new running backs played well and Tulane defeated Southwestern Louisiana 84–0. Elmer Massey scored three touchdowns, and Francis Payne and Don Zimmerman each scored two. Coach Bierman sent in reserves in the second and fourth quarters.

The starting lineup was DeColigny (left end), McCance (left tackle), Bodenger (left guard), Roberts (center), McCormick (right guard), Upton (right tackle), Haynes (right end), Dawson (quarterback), Zimmerman (left halfback), Massey (right halfback), and Felts (fullback).

=== Northwestern ===
Tulane at Northwestern

Team	1	2	3	4	Total
Tulane	0	0	0	0	0
• Northwestern	0	14	0	0	14

- Date: October 4
- Location: Dyche Stadium
  Evanston, Illinois
- Game attendance: 35,000

Tulane was defeated by Big Ten co-champion Northwestern, 14–0, its only loss this season, breaking a school-record 10-game winning steak. (Note: Northwestern's only loss on the season was to national champion Notre Dame) After a scoreless first quarter, Tulane quarterback Red Dawson's pass was intercepted by Northwestern's Hank Bruder, who returned 54 yd (49 m) for a touchdown. Northwestern's quarterback Pug Rentner, a member of the College Football Hall of Fame, scored the next touchdown.

John Scafide's talent was discovered in the game against Northwestern; when he was sent into the game to carry a message to the team, he "started taking two men out on every play".

The starting lineup was Holland (left end), McCance (left tackle), Bodenger (left guard), Roberts (center), McCormick (right guard), Upton (right tackle), Haynes (right end), Dawson (quarterback), Massey (left halfback), Whatley (right halfback), and Felts (fullback).

=== Texas A&M ===
Tulane at Texas A&M

Team	1	2	3	4	Total
• Tulane	6	7	6	0	19
Texas A&M	2	0	0	7	9

- Date: October 11
- Location: Dallas, Texas
- Game attendance: 12,000

At Fair Park Stadium, Dallas, Tulane won 19–9 over Texas A&M. Wop Glover ran for two touchdowns. The Aggies took an early 2–0 lead off a safety from a blocked Felts punt. Glover then ran 62 yd (57 m), sweeping around the left end after a fake pass, behind a devastating block by Dalrymple. Glover's other touchdown was a three-yard (2.7 m) run.

Dawson threw a forward pass to Dalrymple for 31 yards (28 m) and the last Tulane touchdown. The Aggies managed a final score against Tulane's reserves.

The starting lineup was Holland (left end), McCance (left tackle), Bodenger (left guard), Roberts (center), Scafide (right guard), DeColigny (right tackle), Dalrymple (right end), Dawson (quarterback), Massey (left halfback), Glover (right halfback) and Felts (fullback).

=== Birmingham–Southern ===
In a difficult game, Tulane defeated Birmingham–Southern 21–0. Wop Glover scored the first touchdown. In the third quarter, Don Zimmerman broke open the game with a touchdown run of over 50 yards (46 m). The third touchdown came when Tulane got a touchdown on a quarterback sneak by Will Pat Richardson on the goal line on fourth down.

The starting lineup was Holland (left end), McCance (left tackle), Bodenger (left guard), Roberts (center), Scafide (right guard), DeColigny (right tackle), Dalrymple (right end), Dawson (quarterback), Glover (left halfback), Massey (right halfback) and Felts (fullback).

=== Georgia Tech ===
Tulane at Georgia Tech

Team	1	2	3	4	Total
• Tulane	7	12	0	9	28
Ga. Tech	0	0	0	0	0

- Date: October 25
- Location: Grant Field
  Atlanta

On October 25 at Grant Field, Atlanta, Tulane won its first victory over Georgia Tech 28–0. Several attractions were held in Atlanta due to an influx of people from New Orleans; with Moina Michael, who conceived the idea of using poppies as a symbol of remembrance for those who served in World War I, as guest of honor.

Tulane had eleven first downs and Tech had three. Zimmerman had 12 carries for 102 yards (93 m). Zimmerman scored the first touchdown on a 22-yard (20 m) run. He set up a second touchdown by Felts. A long pass to Holland netted a pass interference penalty and soon after, Glover ran a short distance around end for the third touchdown.

In the fourth quarter, Dalrymple and Holland stopped Tech quarterback Earl Dunlap for a safety. For the final score, Felts caught a pass on the 25-yard (23 m) line and ran the rest of the way for a touchdown.

The starting lineup was Holland (left end), McCance (left tackle), Bodenger (left guard), Roberts (center), Scafide (right guard), Upton (right tackle), Dalrymple (right end), Dawson (quarterback), Whatley (left halfback), Glover (right halfback) and Felts (fullback).

Zimmerman's punt return against the Mississippi Aggies.

=== Mississippi A&M ===
Mississippi A&M vs. Tulane

Team	1	2	3	4	Total
Miss. A&M	0	0	0	0	0
• Tulane	14	6	7	26	53

- Date: November 1
- Location: New Orleans, LA

Tulane won against coach Red Cagle's Mississippi A&M team by 53–0. The first touchdown came when Zimmerman ran a punt back 69 yards (63 m). "Early in the second period, Tulane executed a triple pass, Felts to Dawson to Zimmerman, and Zimmerman made his third touchdown by running 28 yards (26 m) around end".

A blocked punt and an interception by Lodrigues helped pour on the scoring in the fourth quarter. The final score of the game came soon after Percy went off right tackle, cut back and went 52 yards (48 m) down to the 5-yard (4.6 m) line. Lemmon plunged behind left guard for the score.

The starting lineup was Holland (left end), McCance (left tackle), Mangum (left guard), Roberts (center), Scafide (right guard), Upton (right tackle), Dalrymple (right end), Dawson (quarterback), Glover (left halfback), Zimmerman (right halfback) and Felts (fullback).

=== Auburn ===
Auburn vs. Tulane

Team	1	2	3	4	Total
Auburn	0	0	0	0	0
• Tulane	0	14	0	7	21

- Date: November 1
- Location: New Orleans, LA

Tulane Green Wave defeated the Auburn Tigers 21–0. Despite the score, it was considered a close game. The first quarter was scoreless. Nollie Felts scored a touchdown in the second quarter. Times-Picayune writer Bill Keefe wrote Felts played "as fine a game as any back ever played".

The highlight of the next scoring drive was a 27-yard (25 m) run by Zimmerman. A 59-yard (54 m) run by Zimmerman in the third quarter was called back due to a holding penalty. At another point, Zimmerman fumbled the ball at Auburn's 1-yard (0.91 m) line; this was recovered by Jimmy Hitchcock for a touchback. Felts scored the game's last touchdown.

According to one account, "Two of Tulane's scores came as the results of breaks, one in the second period as Hitchcock got off a poor punt, and another in the final as Hatfield fumbled, both miscues occurring deep in Auburn territory".

The starting lineup was Holland (left end), Upton (left tackle), Bodenger (left guard), Roberts (center), McCormick (right guard), DeColigny (right tackle), Dalrymple (right end), Dawson (quarterback), Glover (left halfback), Zimmerman (right halfback) and Felts (fullback).

=== Georgia ===
Georgia at Tulane

Team	1	2	3	4	Total
Georgia	0	0	0	0	0
• Tulane	0	6	6	13	25

- Date: November 15
- Location: Tulane Stadium
  New Orleans
- Game attendance: 30,000
- Referee: Rip Major

Tulane defeated the Georgia Bulldogs 25–0 on a muddy field, sealing the conference championship in "one of the finest games ever played by any Green Wave team in Tulane football history". Zimmerman and Glover were both booming punts of over 60 yards (55 m) on quick kicks, and one of Zimmerman's netted 77 yards (70 m) and a touchback.

In the last half-minute of the first quarter, Zimmerman ran 26 yards (24 m) for a touchdown. He went back to pass but nobody was open and the pass rush was on so Zimmerman effectively ran a draw play for a touchdown. He was injured in the play. The second touchdown came on a 25-yard (23 m) run from Glover, running through right tackle, crossing field and breaking the tackle of Georgia safety and quarterback Austin Downes.

The starting lineup was Holland (left end), McCance (left tackle), Bodenger (left guard), Roberts (center), Scafide (right guard), Upton (right tackle), Dalrymple (right end), Dawson (quarterback), Zimmerman (left halfback), Glover (right halfback) and Felts (fullback).

=== LSU ===
LSU at Tulane

Team	1	2	3	4	Total
LSU	0	0	0	7	7
• Tulane	0	7	0	6	13

- Date: November 27
- Location: Tulane Stadium
  New Orleans
- Game attendance: 25,000–28,000
- Referee: Everett Strupper

On Thanksgiving Day, Tulane closed the 1930 season with a 12–7 win over the rival LSU Tigers. LSU blocked a punt and scored a touchdown, and kept Dalrymple well covered. Governor Huey P. Long cheered on the Tigers.

The starting lineup was Holland (left end), McCance (left tackle), Bodenger (left guard), Roberts (center), Scafide (right guard), Upton (right tackle), Dalrymple (right end), Dawson (quarterback), Glover (left halfback), Zimmerman (right halfback) and Felts (fullback).

== Post-season ==
Times-Picayune sports writer Pete Baird called the 1930 squad "the best team that ever represented the Olive and Blue". Both Alabama and Tulane claimed SoCon titles. Tulane, which had been undefeated by a SoCon school for two years, challenged Alabama to a postseason contest but Alabama declined.

Wop Glover, as the school's best all-around athlete, received the Porter Cup. Collier's Weekly chose Dalrymple for the first-team All-American, and International News Service chose Roberts as a third-team All-American. Zimmerman and Bodenger received votes for All-Southern, both appearing on Associated Press's second team. Maury Bodenger went on to play for the National Football League's Portsmouth Spartans, which later became the Detroit Lions.

Jack Holland took up professional boxing to earn money to finish his Tulane degree and with the ultimate intent of coaching high school football. He also worked as an artist's model to pay for his education. He won the Southern A. A. U. light-heavyweight boxing title in 1932. On May 9, 1933, Holland died from a cerebral hemorrhage after losing in six rounds to Tony Marullo. As Holland climbed through the ropes to go to the dressing room, ringsiders heard him say; "I [head]butted him" before he collapsed.

Jerry Dalrymple was elected to the College Football Hall of Fame as a player in 1954, the second class of inductees. (Note: Dalrymple was also nominated though not selected for an Associated Press All-Time Southeast 1920-1969 era team.) Don Zimmerman was inducted into the Louisiana Sports Hall of Fame in 1975. (Note: Zimmerman also played basketball and pole vaulted.) Red Dawson was elected to the Tulane Athletic Hall of Fame in 1980, as were Wop Glover in 1984, John Scafide in 1985, and Loyd Roberts and Nollie Felts in 1990.

== Personnel ==
=== Players ===
The following 25 players received varsity letters for their participation on the 1939 Tulane football team:

- Maury Bodenger, guard, New Orleans
- Thomas Cunningham, tackle, Pine Bluff, Arkansas
- Jerry Dalrymple, end, Arkadelphia, Arkansas
- Red Dawson, quarterback, River Falls, Wisconsin
- Calvert DeColigny, tackle, New Orleans
- Nollie Felts, fullback, Hattiesburg, Mississippi
- Wop Glover, halfback, Bay St. Louis, Mississippi
- James Gresham
- Vernon Haynes, end, Arkansas City, Arkansas
- James Hodgins, halfback, Shreveport, Louisiana
- Jack Holland, end, Shreveport, Louisiana
- Harold Lemmon, fullback, Patterson, Louisiana
- Winnie Lodrigues, center
- Elmer McCance, tackle
- John McCormick, guard, Monroe, Louisiana
- Doyle Magee, end, Franklinton, Louisiana
- Myrtus Mangum, guard
- Elmer Massey, halfback
- Francis Payne, fullback, Winterville, Mississippi
- Will Pat Richardson, quarterback, Ponchatoula, Louisiana
- Loyd Roberts, center and captain
- John Scafide, Bay St. Louis, Mississippi
- Claggert Upton, tackle, New Orleans
- Hugh Whatley, halfback, Rayville, Louisiana
- Don Zimmerman, halfback, Lake Charles, Louisiana

=== Gallery ===
Captain Loyd Roberts

Jerry Dalrymple

Don Zimmerman

Maury Bodenger

Nollie Felts

Wop Glover

Doyle Magee

John Scafide

=== Coaches and administrators ===
- Head coach: Bernie Bierman
- Athletic director: Wilbur C. Smith
- Assistant coaches: Ted Cox (line coach); Ted Bank (freshman coach)
- Physical director: Claude Simons Sr.

=== Depth chart ===
The following chart provides a visual depiction of Tulane's lineup during the 1930 season with games started at the position reflected in parentheses. The chart mimics a single wing on offense.

LE Jack Holland (8) Calvert DeColigny (1)	LG Maury Bodenger (8) Mangum (1)	C Loyd Roberts (9) Winnie Lodrigues (0)	RG John Scafide (6) John McCormick (3)	LT Elmer McCance (8) Claggert Upton (1)	RT Claggert Upton (6) Calvert DeColigny (3)	RE Jerry Dalrymple (7) Vernon Haynes (2)
				QB Red Dawson (9) Will Pat Richardson (0)			RHB Don Zimmerman (3) Wop Glover (3) Elmer Massey (2) Hugh Whatley (1) Percy (0)
			FB Nollie Felts (9) Francis Payne (0)
	LHB Wop Glover (4) Elmer Massey (2) Don Zimmerman (2) Hugh Whatley (1) Adolph Jastram (0)

=== Line ===
Number	Player	Position	Games started	Hometown
44	Maury Bodenger	guard		New Orleans
41	Thomas Cunningham	tackle		Pine Bluff, Arkansas
33	Jerry Dalrymple	end		Arkadelphia, Arkansas
35	Calvert DeColigny	tackle		New Orleans
24	William Drawe	end		New Orleans
38	William Featherngill	tackle		Independence, Kansas
19	Vernon Haynes	end		Arkansas City, Arkansas
39	Doyless Hill	center		Sand Springs, Oklahoma
21	Jack Holland	end		Shreveport
30	Winnie Lodrigues	center		
20	Doyle Magee	end		Franklinton
32	Mangum	guard		
40	Elmer McCance	tackle		
34	John McCormick	guard		Monroe
23	William Penney	guard		Guatemala City, C. A.
36	John Read	center		Picayune, Mississippi
45	Loyd Roberts	center		
42	John Scafide	guard		Bay St. Louis, Mississippi
43	Claggert Upton	tackle		New Orleans
31	Sam Zemurray	tackle		New Orleans

=== Backfield ===
Number	Player	Position	Games started	Hometown
26	Red Dawson	quarterback		River Falls, Wisconsin
37	Nollie Felts	fullback		Hattiesburg, Mississippi
15	Wop Glover	halfback		Bay St. Louis, Mississippi
12	George Haik	halfback		Bogalusa
27	James Hodgins	halfback		Shreveport
11	Adolph Jastram	halfback		New Orleans
17	Harold Lemmon	fullback		Patterson
22	Elmer Massey	halfback		
29	Francis Payne	fullback		Winterville, Mississippi
13	Percy	halfback		
14	Will Pat Richardson	quarterback		Ponchatoula
25	Edward Tschirn	halfback		New Orleans
7	Hugh Whatley	halfback		Rayville
18	Don Zimmerman	halfback		Lake Charles

=== Unlisted ===
Number	Player
10	Guy
28	Pierce
