= 1930 VPI Gobblers football team =

American college football season

1930 VPI Gobblers football
- Conference: Southern Conference
- Record: 5–3–1 (2–3–1 SoCon)
- Head coach: Orville Neal (1st season)
- Captain: Henry Virgil Hooper
- Home stadium: Miles Stadium

1930 Southern Conference football standings
	Conf.					Overall
Team	W		L		T	W		L		T
No. 3 Alabama +	8	–	0	–	0	10	–	0	–	0
No. 11 Tulane +	5	–	0	–	0	8	–	1	–	0
No. 10 Tennessee	6	–	1	–	0	9	–	1	–	0
Duke	4	–	1	–	1	8	–	1	–	2
Vanderbilt	5	–	2	–	0	8	–	2	–	0
Maryland	4	–	2	–	0	7	–	5	–	0
Florida	4	–	2	–	1	6	–	3	–	1
North Carolina	4	–	2	–	2	5	–	3	–	2
Clemson	3	–	2	–	0	8	–	2	–	0
Georgia	3	–	2	–	1	7	–	2	–	1
Kentucky	4	–	3	–	0	5	–	3	–	0
South Carolina	4	–	3	–	0	6	–	4	–	0
VPI	2	–	3	–	1	5	–	3	–	1
Mississippi A&M	2	–	3	–	0	2	–	7	–	0
Georgia Tech	2	–	4	–	1	2	–	6	–	1
LSU	2	–	4	–	0	6	–	4	–	0
Virginia	2	–	5	–	0	4	–	6	–	0
Sewanee	1	–	4	–	0	3	–	6	–	1
NC State	1	–	5	–	0	2	–	8	–	0
Ole Miss	1	–	5	–	0	3	–	5	–	1
Auburn	1	–	6	–	0	3	–	7	–	0
Washington and Lee	0	–	4	–	1	3	–	6	–	1
VMI	0	–	5	–	0	3	–	6	–	0
+ – Conference co-champions; Rankings from Dickinson System

The 1930 VPI Gobblers football team represented Virginia Polytechnic Institute in the 1930 college football season. The team was led by their head coach Orville Neale and finished with a record of five wins, three losses and one tie (5–3–1).

== Schedule ==
Date	Time	Opponent	Site	Result	Attendance	Source
September 27		Roanoke*	Miles Stadium; Blacksburg, VA	W 9–0		
October 4	2:30 p.m.	North Carolina	Miles Stadium; Blacksburg, VA	L 21–39	5,000	
October 11		at Vanderbilt	Dudley Field; Nashville, TN	L 0–40		
October 18	2:30 p.m.	vs. William & Mary*	City Stadium; Richmond, VA	W 7–6	8,000	
October 25	2:30 p.m.	at Davidson*	Richardson Stadium; Davidson, NC	W 20–19		
November 1	2:30 p.m.	at Washington and Lee	Wilson Field; Lexington, VA	T 0–0	4,000-6,000	
November 8		Virginia^{†}	Miles Stadium; Blacksburg, VA (rivalry)	W 34–13		
November 15		vs. Maryland	Bain Field; Norfolk, VA	L 7–13	7,000	
November 27		vs. VMI	Maher Field; Roanoke, VA (rivalry)	W 24–0	20,000	
*Non-conference game; ^{†}Homecoming; All times are in Eastern time

== Before the season ==
The 1929 VPI Gobblers football team compiled a 5–4 record and were led by Andy Gustafson in his fourth season as head coach. On January 31, 1930, Gustafson resigned as the head coach to become the head backfield coach at the University of Pittsburgh, his alma mater.

== Game summaries ==
=== Roanoke ===
Roanoke vs. VPI

Team	1	2	3	4	Total
Roanoke	0	0	0	0	0
• VPI	2	0	0	7	9

- Date: September 27, 1930
- Location: Miles Stadium
  Blacksburg, VA
- Referee: Red Weaver

VPI's first game of the season was a victory over Roanoke at Miles Stadium.

The starting lineup for VPI was: Seaman (left end), Ritter (left tackle), Jones (left guard), Brown (center), Hite (right guard), Green (right tackle), McIntre (right end), Hooper (quarterback), Spear (left halfback), Ottley (right halfback), Owens (fullback). The substitutes were: Cubberly, Hall, Hardwick, Howard, Miles, Palmer, Stark and Swart.

The starting lineup for Roanoke was: Copenhaver (left end), Smith (left tackle), Glenn Holyfield (left guard), John Burks (center), Ed I. Bell (right guard), Lloyd "Buzzy" Goode (right tackle), Lexter Holyfield (right end), Billy O. Williams (quarterback), Possum Matthews (left halfback), S. C. Rutherford (right halfback), Pleas Ramsey (fullback). The substitutes were: R. B. Farley, Frye, McDermott, Harry Russell, Stephens and Thomas.

=== North Carolina ===
North Carolina vs. VPI

Team	1	2	3	4	Total
• UNC	14	7	12	6	39
VPI	7	0	7	7	21

- Date: October 4, 1930
- Location: Miles Stadium
  Blacksburg, VA
- Game attendance: 5,000
- Referee: Richard Carrington (UVA)

After their victory over Roanoke, VPI played the University of North Carolina at Miles Stadium.

The starting lineup for VPI was: Seaman (left end), Swart (left tackle), Dyke (left guard), Brown (center), Stark (right guard), Green (right tackle), McIntre (right end), Hooper (quarterback), Spear (left halfback), Hardwick (right halfback), Owens (fullback). The substitutes were: Chandler, Grinus, Hall, Hite, Howard, Jones, Kasun, Ottley, Palmer, Ritter and Wimmer.

The starting lineup for North Carolina was: Larry Johnson (left end), George Thompson (left tackle), Henry McIver (left guard), Edward Lipscomb (center), Ellis Fysal (right guard), June Underwood (right tackle), Robert Parsley (right end), John Branch (quarterback), Jimmy Maus (left halfback), Rip Slusser (right halfback), Henry House (fullback). The substitutes were: Bridges, Dunavant, Charles Erickson, Red Gilbreath, Hodges, James Magner, Roy McDade, J. McNeil, Moore, Edward Nash, William Tabb and Pete Wyrick.

=== Vanderbilt ===
VPI at Vanderbilt

Team	1	2	3	4	Total
VPI	0	0	0	0	0
• Vanderbilt	21	7	6	6	40

- Date: October 11, 1930
- Location: Dudley Field
  Nashville, TN
- Referee: Frank Lane

The starting lineup for VPI was: McIntre (left end), Grinus (left tackle), Dyke (left guard), Brown (center), Stark (right guard), Swart (right tackle), Seaman (right end), Hooper (quarterback), Hall (left halfback), Ottley (right halfback), Owens (fullback).

The starting lineup for Vanderbilt was: Joseph Scheffer (left end), Martin McNamara (left tackle), Charles Hughes (left guard), Sharp (center), Robert Lockett (right guard), Hobbs (right tackle), Julian Foster (right end), Thomas Henderson (quarterback), William McNevin (left halfback), Clyde Roberts (right halfback), Charles Scheffer (fullback). The substitutes were: Hudgins, Pat Kirwan, Amos Leonard, Benny Parker and William Schwartz.

=== William & Mary ===
William & Mary vs. VPI

Team	1	2	3	4	Total
W&M	0	0	0	6	6
• VPI	0	7	0	0	7

- Date: October 18, 1930
- Location: City Stadium
  Richmond, VA
- Game attendance: 8,000
- Referee: Witt (UVA)

The starting lineup for VPI was: Seaman (left end), Ritter (left tackle), Dyke (left guard), Brown (center), Stark (right guard), Green (right tackle), McIntre (right end), Hooper (quarterback), Hall (left halfback), Ottley (right halfback), Howard (fullback). The substitutes were: Hardwick, Hite, Jones, Owens and Swart.

The starting lineup for William & Mary was: R. D. Bauserman (left end), James Murphy (left tackle), Crawford Syer (left guard), Ferrell (center), Edwin Meade (right guard), Otis Douglas (right tackle), Thomas Halligan (right end), Mitchell Mozeleski (quarterback), Clarence Maxey (left halfback), Paul Baldacci (right halfback), Butch Constantino (fullback). The substitutes were: William Koufman, Aime LaCroix, Lindsay, Roberts and William Scott.

=== Davidson ===
VPI at Davidson

Team	1	2	3	4	Total
• VPI	0	0	6	14	20
Davidson	6	0	7	6	19

- Date: October 25, 1930
- Location: Richardson Stadium
  Davidson, NC
- Game weather: "Brisk Autumn breeze"
- Referee: Paul Magoffin

The starting lineup for VPI was: Seaman (left end), Ritter (left tackle), Stark (left guard), Brown (center), Hite (right guard), Green (right tackle), McIntre (right end), Hooper (quarterback), Spear (left halfback), Ottley (right halfback), Howard (fullback). The substitute were Grinus, Hall, Hardwick, Owens and Swart.

The starting lineup for Davidson was: James Proctor (left end), Hub Covington (left tackle), Thad Brock (left guard), Ulrich Gardner (center), C. T. Parker (right guard), Lelon Raker (right tackle), Steve Brown (right end), Walter Fraley (quarterback), Joseph McCall (left halfback), Donald King (right halfback), Thomas Brohard (fullback). The substitutes were: Powhatan Conway, William Mason, Doc Mathis, Donald McQueen, Martin Miller, Allen Mills, Pierce and John Wagner.

=== Washington and Lee ===
VPI at Washington and Lee

Team	1	2	3	4	Total
VPI	0	0	0	0	0
W&L	0	0	0	0	0

- Date: November 1, 1930
- Location: Wilson Field
  Lexington, VA
- Game start: 2:30 p.m.
- Game attendance: 4,000-6,000
- Referee: Richard Carrington (UVA)

The starting lineup for VPI was: Seaman (left end), Stark (left tackle), Hite (left guard), Brown (center), Dyke (right guard), Grinus (right tackle), McIntre (right end), Hooper (quarterback), Spear (left halfback), Hall (right halfback), Howard (fullback).

The starting lineup for Washington and Lee was: Leigh Williams (left end), Frank Bailey (left tackle), Jerry Holstein (left guard), Herbert Groop (center), Charles Tilson (right guard), John Faulkner (right tackle), Page Bledsoe (right end), Martin (quarterback), E. H. Smith (left halfback), M. N. Thibodeau (right halfback), Patrick Mitchell (fullback). The substitutes were: Charles Cocke, A. C. "Red" Jones and Wilbur Mattox.

=== Virginia ===
Virginia vs. VPI

Team	1	2	3	4	Total
UVA	7	6	0	0	13
• VPI	7	6	14	7	34

- Date: November 8, 1930
- Location: Miles Stadium
  Blacksburg, VA
- Referee: Frank Lane

VPI's 1930 homecoming game was a victory over rival Virginia.

The starting lineup for VPI was: Seaman (left end), Stark (left tackle), Jones (left guard), Brown (center), Hite (right guard), Ritter (right tackle), McIntre (right end), Hooper (quarterback), Owens (left halfback), Spear (right halfback), Howard (fullback). The substitutes were: Chandler, Dyke, Green, Kasun, Swart and Wimmer.

The starting lineup for Virginia was: William Condon (left end), Hunter Motley (left tackle), Thomas Eckard (left guard), Lewis Reiss (center), George Cameron (right guard), Charles Poss (right tackle), Segar Gravatt (right end), Frank Sippley (quarterback), William Thomas (left halfback), James Beury (right halfback), Herbert Bryant (fullback). The substitutes were: Ward Brewer, Howdy Myers, Payne, Ben Pinder, Henry Sackett, J. W. St. Clair and Cris Tomkins.

=== Maryland ===
Maryland vs. VPI

Team	1	2	3	4	Total
• Maryland	6	7	0	0	13
VPI	0	0	0	7	7

- Date: November 15, 1930
- Location: Bain Field
  Norfolk, VA
- Game attendance: 7,000
- Game weather: "muddy"
- Referee: Paul Magoffin

The starting lineup for VPI was: Seaman (left end), Stark (left tackle), Hite (left guard), Brown (center), Jones (right guard), Green (right tackle), McIntre (right end), Hooper (quarterback), Owens (left halfback), Hall (right halfback), Howard (fullback). The substitutes were: Dyke, Hardwick, Kasun, Ritter, Spear, Swart and Wolfe.

The starting lineup for Maryland was: Jack Norris (left end), William Fisher (left tackle), Courtney Hayden (left guard), Parker Faber (center), Jesse Krajcovic (right guard), Ernie Carliss (right tackle), Alfred Pease (right end), Al Woods (quarterback), George V. Chalmers (left halfback), Boze Berger (right halfback), Ray Poppelman (fullback). The substitutes were: William W. Evans and Bill Wood.

=== VMI ===
VMI vs. VPI

Team	1	2	3	4	Total
VMI	0	0	0	0	0
• VPI	9	3	0	12	24

- Date: November 27, 1930
- Location: Maher Field
  Roanoke, VA
- Game attendance: 20,000
- Game weather: "chilly"
- Referee: E. F. Houghitt (Michigan)

The starting lineup for VPI was: Seaman (left end), Stark (left tackle), Hite (left guard), Brown (center), Jones (right guard), Grinus (right tackle), McIntre (right end), Hardwick (quarterback), Hooper (left halfback), Owens (right halfback), Howard (fullback). The substitutes were: Hall and Ottley.

The starting lineup for VMI was: John Gill (left end), Henry Ford (left tackle), George Shell (left guard), Edward Paxton (center), Pus Hilliard (right guard), William Kaylor (right tackle), J. T. Walker (right end), Ernest Laughorn (quarterback), Duane Wright (left halfback), Harold Williams (right halfback), Roy Dunn (fullback). The substitutes were: Thomas Grainger, Louis Seigel and Paul Travers.

== Players ==
=== Roster ===
VPI 1930 roster
C. H. Barnes; R. M. Barnes; William Earle Betts; Charles Eugene Brown; Edwin F. Chandler; R. W. Clifton; H. J. Cooper; George Ellis Cubberly; Earl Dyke; Luther Rice Edwards; Gaines; John Buckner Green; Bill Grinus; Cushman Caldwell Hagerty; Earl Jenis Hall; Samuel Elkana Hardwick; Eugene Goliday Hite; Bird Hooper (Capt.); Frank A. Howard; H. E. Hutcheson; Warner Brooke Jones	M. J. "Red" Kasun; Thomas Marvin Larner; John McIntire; W. L. "Sonny" Miles; Charles Emmett Ashburn Morgan; John Marshall Murphy; Waightes Gibbs Ottley; Milton Anthony Owens; Benny Palmer; A. W. Ristine; Marcus Oliver Ritter; S. L. Schrieberg; Alfred Elsworth Seaman; W. G. Smith; Philip Hitchborn Spear; Harry Hyman Stark; James L. Swart; S. N. Thompson; Harold J. Wimmer; Paul Kenneth Wolfe

=== Monogram Club members ===
Seventeen players received monograms for their participation on the 1930 VPI team.

Player	Hometown	Notes
Charles Eugene "Dolly" Brown	Portsmouth, Virginia	
Earl E. Dyke	Newport News, Virginia	
John Buckner Green	Culpeper, Virginia	World War II veteran (Tec 5, Army).
Bill Grinus	Orient, Illinois	
Earl Jenis Hall	Princeton, West Virginia	
Samuel Elkana Hardwick	Dublin, Virginia	
Eugene Goliday Hite	Port Deposit, Maryland	Lieutenant Colonel, Army. Lost on Canadian Pacific Air Lines Flight 3505.
Henry Virgil "Bird" Hooper	Newport News, Virginia	
Frank A. Howard	Childress, Virginia	
Warner Brooke Jones	Gloucester, Virginia	
John A. McIntire	Moundsville, West Virginia	
Waightes Gibbs Ottley	Norfolk, Virginia	
Milton Anthony Owens	Portsmouth, Virginia	
Marcus Oliver Ritter	Winchester, Virginia	
Alfred Elsworth Seaman	Pontiac, Michigan	World War II veteran (Sergeant, Army).
Philip Hitchborn Spear	Portsmouth, Virginia	
Harry Hyman Stark	Portsmouth, Virginia	

== Coaching and training staff ==
- Head coach: Orville Neal
- Assistant coaches
  - P. Hotchkiss
  - Herbert McEver
  - J. O. Looney
  - Line coach: Lyal Clark
- Manager: H. H. Hurt
- Freshman head coach: Henry Redd
- Freshman Manager: J. W. Montgomery
