= Monk Dorsett =

American football and basketball player (1909–1992)

- Dorsett tossing a pass on the beach.

Profile
- Positions: Quarterback, halfback

Personal information
- Born: May 13, 1909; Macon, Georgia, U.S.
- Died: December 16, 1992 (aged 83); Baton Rouge, Louisiana, U.S.

Career information
- High school: Duval
- College: Florida (1929–1932)

Luke P. "Monk" Dorsett (May 13, 1909 – December 16, 1992) was a college football and basketball player. Dorsett attended Duval High in his native Jacksonville. Dorsett was a running back for coach Charlie Bachman's Florida Gators football team; starting at quarterback from 1930 to 1932. After a year on the freshman team in 1928, Dorsett was a starting halfback in 1929; the star of the Washington and Lee game, scoring two touchdowns. He threw multiple touchdown passes in the 1930 victory over Josh Cody's Clemson Tigers and was the star of the season. Coach Bachman said "Dorsett's quarterbacking has been the finest since I took charge of the 'Gators." After Carlos Proctor was dismissed from the 1931 team, it was thought alternate-captain Dorsett would be made captain.
