= 1930 Sewanee Tigers football team =

American college football season

1930 Sewanee Tigers football
- Conference: Southern Conference
- Record: 3–6–1 (1–4 SoCon)
- Head coach: Harvey Harman (1st season)
- Home stadium: Hardee Field

1930 Southern Conference football standings
	Conf.					Overall
Team	W		L		T	W		L		T
No. 3 Alabama +	8	–	0	–	0	10	–	0	–	0
No. 11 Tulane +	5	–	0	–	0	8	–	1	–	0
No. 10 Tennessee	6	–	1	–	0	9	–	1	–	0
Duke	4	–	1	–	1	8	–	1	–	2
Vanderbilt	5	–	2	–	0	8	–	2	–	0
Maryland	4	–	2	–	0	7	–	5	–	0
Florida	4	–	2	–	1	6	–	3	–	1
North Carolina	4	–	2	–	2	5	–	3	–	2
Clemson	3	–	2	–	0	8	–	2	–	0
Georgia	3	–	2	–	1	7	–	2	–	1
Kentucky	4	–	3	–	0	5	–	3	–	0
South Carolina	4	–	3	–	0	6	–	4	–	0
VPI	2	–	3	–	1	5	–	3	–	1
Mississippi A&M	2	–	3	–	0	2	–	7	–	0
Georgia Tech	2	–	4	–	1	2	–	6	–	1
LSU	2	–	4	–	0	6	–	4	–	0
Virginia	2	–	5	–	0	4	–	6	–	0
Sewanee	1	–	4	–	0	3	–	6	–	1
NC State	1	–	5	–	0	2	–	8	–	0
Ole Miss	1	–	5	–	0	3	–	5	–	1
Auburn	1	–	6	–	0	3	–	7	–	0
Washington and Lee	0	–	4	–	1	3	–	6	–	1
VMI	0	–	5	–	0	3	–	6	–	0
+ – Conference co-champions; Rankings from Dickinson System

The 1930 Sewanee Tigers football team was an American football team that represented the Sewanee: The University of the South as a member of the Southern Conference during the 1930 college football season. In their first year under head coach Harvey Harman, the team compiled a 3–6–1 record.

== Schedule ==
Date	Opponent	Site	Result	Attendance	Source
September 20	Jacksonville State*	Hardee Field; Sewanee, TN	W 25–0		
September 27	Tennessee Tech*	Hardee Field; Sewanee, TN	W 14–0		
October 4	at Kentucky	Stoll Field; Lexington, KY	L 0–37	9,000	
October 11	at Alabama	Legion Field; Birmingham, AL	L 0–25		
October 17	at Ole Miss	Hemingway Stadium; Oxford, MS	W 13–7		
October 25	at LSU	Tiger Stadium; Baton Rouge, LA	L 0–12		
November 1	at Rice*	Rice Field; Houston, TX	L 0–12		
November 8	at Chattanooga*	Chamberlain Field; Chattanooga, TN	T 0–0		
November 15	at South Carolina	Melton Field; Columbia, SC	L 13–14	5,000	
November 22	at Southwestern (TN)*	Fargason Field; Memphis, TN (rivalry)	L 6–26	2,500	
*Non-conference game
