= 1930 VMI Keydets football team =

American college football season

1930 VMI Keydets football
- Conference: Southern Conference
- Record: 3–6 (0–5 SoCon)
- Head coach: W. C. Raftery (4th season)
- Home stadium: Alumni Field

1930 Southern Conference football standings
	Conf.					Overall
Team	W		L		T	W		L		T
No. 3 Alabama +	8	–	0	–	0	10	–	0	–	0
No. 11 Tulane +	5	–	0	–	0	8	–	1	–	0
No. 10 Tennessee	6	–	1	–	0	9	–	1	–	0
Duke	4	–	1	–	1	8	–	1	–	2
Vanderbilt	5	–	2	–	0	8	–	2	–	0
Maryland	4	–	2	–	0	7	–	5	–	0
Florida	4	–	2	–	1	6	–	3	–	1
North Carolina	4	–	2	–	2	5	–	3	–	2
Clemson	3	–	2	–	0	8	–	2	–	0
Georgia	3	–	2	–	1	7	–	2	–	1
Kentucky	4	–	3	–	0	5	–	3	–	0
South Carolina	4	–	3	–	0	6	–	4	–	0
VPI	2	–	3	–	1	5	–	3	–	1
Mississippi A&M	2	–	3	–	0	2	–	7	–	0
Georgia Tech	2	–	4	–	1	2	–	6	–	1
LSU	2	–	4	–	0	6	–	4	–	0
Virginia	2	–	5	–	0	4	–	6	–	0
Sewanee	1	–	4	–	0	3	–	6	–	1
NC State	1	–	5	–	0	2	–	8	–	0
Ole Miss	1	–	5	–	0	3	–	5	–	1
Auburn	1	–	6	–	0	3	–	7	–	0
Washington and Lee	0	–	4	–	1	3	–	6	–	1
VMI	0	–	5	–	0	3	–	6	–	0
+ – Conference co-champions; Rankings from Dickinson System

The 1930 VMI Keydets football team was an American football team that represented the Virginia Military Institute (VMI) during the 1930 college football season as a member of the Southern Conference. In their fourth year under head coach W. C. Raftery, the team compiled an overall record of 3–6.

== Schedule ==
Date	Opponent	Site	Result	Source
September 27	Richmond*	Alumni Field; Lexington, VA (rivalry)	W 12–0	
October 4	St. John's (MD)*	Alumni Field; Lexington, VA	W 6–0	
October 11	at The Citadel*	Johnson Hagood Stadium; Charleston, SC (rivalry)	L 6–7	
October 18	Virginia	Alumni Field; Lexington, VA	L 0–13	
October 25	vs. Maryland	City Stadium; Richmond, VA	L 0–20	
November 1	Davidson*	Alumni Field; Lexington, VA	W 6–0	
November 8	vs. Clemson	Bain Field; Norfolk, VA	L 0–32	
November 15	at Kentucky	McLean Stadium; Lexington, KY	L 0–26	
November 27	vs. VPI	Maher Field; Roanoke, VA (rivalry)	L 0–24	
*Non-conference game
