= 1930 Florida Gators football team =

American college football season

1930 Florida Gators football
- Conference: Southern Conference
- Record: 6–3–1 (4–2–1 SoCon)
- Head coach: Charlie Bachman (3rd season)
- Offensive scheme: Notre Dame Box
- Captain: Red Bethea
- Home stadium: Fleming Field, Florida Field

Uniform
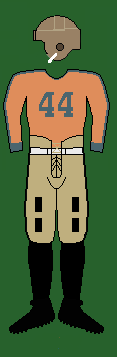

1930 Southern Conference football standings
	Conf.					Overall
Team	W		L		T	W		L		T
No. 3 Alabama +	8	–	0	–	0	10	–	0	–	0
No. 11 Tulane +	5	–	0	–	0	8	–	1	–	0
No. 10 Tennessee	6	–	1	–	0	9	–	1	–	0
Duke	4	–	1	–	1	8	–	1	–	2
Vanderbilt	5	–	2	–	0	8	–	2	–	0
Maryland	4	–	2	–	0	7	–	5	–	0
Florida	4	–	2	–	1	6	–	3	–	1
North Carolina	4	–	2	–	2	5	–	3	–	2
Clemson	3	–	2	–	0	8	–	2	–	0
Georgia	3	–	2	–	1	7	–	2	–	1
Kentucky	4	–	3	–	0	5	–	3	–	0
South Carolina	4	–	3	–	0	6	–	4	–	0
VPI	2	–	3	–	1	5	–	3	–	1
Mississippi A&M	2	–	3	–	0	2	–	7	–	0
Georgia Tech	2	–	4	–	1	2	–	6	–	1
LSU	2	–	4	–	0	6	–	4	–	0
Virginia	2	–	5	–	0	4	–	6	–	0
Sewanee	1	–	4	–	0	3	–	6	–	1
NC State	1	–	5	–	0	2	–	8	–	0
Ole Miss	1	–	5	–	0	3	–	5	–	1
Auburn	1	–	6	–	0	3	–	7	–	0
Washington and Lee	0	–	4	–	1	3	–	6	–	1
VMI	0	–	5	–	0	3	–	6	–	0
+ – Conference co-champions; Rankings from Dickinson System

The 1930 Florida Gators football team represented the University of Florida in the sport of American football during the 1930 college football season. The season was Charlie Bachman's third as the head coach of the Florida Gators football team. Bachman's 1930 Florida Gators finished the season with a 6–3–1 overall record and a 4–2–1 Southern Conference record, placing seventh of twenty-three teams in the conference standings.

Among the season's highlights were the Gators' conference victories over the NC State Wolfpack (27–0), Auburn Tigers (7–0), Clemson Tigers (27–0), and Georgia Tech Yellow Jackets (55–7)—their first win in seven tries against the Yellow Jackets. Also notable was an intersectional victory over the Chicago Maroons (19–0) on Chicago's home field. The season also featured the (delayed) opening of Florida Field, which debuted in November with a 20–0 homecoming loss to Wallace Wade's national champion Alabama Crimson Tide in front of a school record crowd of 18,000.

Though Florida's 6-3-1 record in 1930 fell short of expectations, it would later be regarded as somewhat of a high point. Bachman coached the Gators to losing seasons the next two years before leaving the program, and the Gators would post only three winning seasons between 1930 and 1956.

== Before the season ==
Florida entered the 1930s coming off the two best seasons in program history under returning head coach Charlie Bachman, who led a talented squad that included record-setting halfback Red Bethea. Despite a potentially challenging schedule, expectations were that the recent string of success would continue.

=== New stadium ===
Fleming Field had been the home of Florida's football program since 1911. By the mid 1920s, its small capacity and primitive amenities were increasingly seen as inadequate, particularly after the Gators first gained national attention during their best season to date in 1928. University president John J. Tigert led a fundraising drive through the newly created University Athletic Association, and construction on a much larger stadium commenced in a shallow depression just south of Fleming Field on April 16, 1930. The project was slated to be complete early in the fall term but was delayed when workers encountered a previously unknown underground stream. The stream was diverted by the installation of a large culvert under the playing surface, and the Gators finally moved into Florida Field for the last home game of the season.

.

== Schedule ==
Date	Opponent	Site	Result	Attendance
September 27	Southern College*	Fleming Field; Gainesville, FL	W 45–6	
October 4	vs. NC State	Plant Field; Tampa, FL	W 27–0	10,000
October 11	vs. Auburn	Fairfield Stadium; Jacksonville, FL (rivalry)	W 7–0	
October 18	at Chicago*	Stagg Field; Chicago, IL	W 19–0	10,000
October 25	Furman*	Fleming Field; Gainesville, FL	L 13–14	
November 1	vs. Georgia	Municipal Stadium; Savannah, GA (rivalry)	T 0–0	
November 8	Alabama^{†}	Florida Field; Gainesville, FL (rivalry)	L 0–20	18,000
November 15	vs. Clemson	Fairfield Stadium; Jacksonville, FL	W 27–0	
November 27	at Georgia Tech	Grant Field; Atlanta, GA	W 55–7	
December 6	vs. Tennessee	Fairfield Stadium; Jacksonville, FL (rivalry)	L 6–13	
*Non-conference game; ^{†}Homecoming

== Game summaries ==
=== Week 1: Southern College ===
Image from Florida-Southern College game.

The Gators faced Southern College on Fleming Field in Gainesville to open the season on September 27, winning 45 to 6. Southern scored its points in the second quarter, at that point making the game tied 6 to 6. The Gators responded with a barrage of points which continued until the final whistle.

Red Bethea had three touchdowns on his first three touches, including runs of 46 and 48 yards. This got Bethea a column in Ripley's Believe It Or Not.

=== Week 2: North Carolina State ===
Week 2: North Carolina State at Florida

Team	1	2	3	4	Total
NC State	0	0	0	0	0
• Florida	0	0	27	0	27

- Date: October 4
- Location: Plant Field
  Tampa, Florida
- Game attendance: 10,000

For the second week of play, Florida beat the North Carolina State Wolfpack on Plant Field in Tampa 27 to 0.

After being held scoreless in the first half with a number of fumbles, a 37-yard end run from Red Bethea sparked the Gator attack. Ed Sauls had a 61-yard kick return, which ended when he stumbled and fell. On the next play he scored. Sam Gurneau and Charlie Cobb starred for NC State.

=== Week 3: Auburn ===
Week 3: Auburn at Florida

Team	1	2	3	4	Total
Auburn	0	0	0	0	0
• Florida	0	0	0	7	7

- Date: October 11
- Location: Fairfield Stadium
  Jacksonville, Florida

The Gators just defeated coach Chet A. Wynne's Auburn Tigers in Jacksonville by a 7 to 0 score; seen as a moral victory by the Tigers. Ed Sauls scored Florida's touchdown in the final period, and Monk Dorsett got the extra point.

=== Week 4: at Chicago ===
Week 4: Florida at Chicago

Team	1	2	3	4	Total
• Florida	0	13	0	6	19
Chicago	0	0	0	0	0

- Date: October 18
- Location: Stagg Field
  Chicago
- Game attendance: 10,000
- Game weather: Near 0
- Referee: Joe Magidsohn

On October 18, 1930, the Gators defeated coach Amos Alonzo Stagg's Chicago Maroons at Stagg Field 19 to 0 in a game was affected by wintry blasts of near-zero temperatures. n . The victory was historic for the Florida football program, representing the first time the Gators had won an inter-sectional game outside the South. The Gators had previously lost all six games it had played in the North—to Indiana in 1916, Harvard in 1922 and 1929, Army in 1923 and 1924, and Chicago in 1926.

Red Bethea was the star of the historic victory over Chicago, rushing for 218 yards to set a school record that would not be broken until 1987, when Emmitt Smith ran for 224 yards in his first collegiate start. The Associated Press called Bethea Florida's "siege gun," and noted that his rushing total was "better than the whole Chicago backfield." Bethea contributed to all of Florida's points. The first came after Bethea made a series of 5-yard runs, down to the 5-yard line as the first quarter ended. He then ran behind Muddy Waters for the score. Later, Bethea ran down to the 2-yard line on a fake reverse. Ed Sauls went over for the touchdown. Proctor kicked goal. In the fourth quarter, Bethea ran for a 70-yard touchdown, "accomplished by brilliant, running, twisting, and swerving." Bethea "went wide around the right side of the line, cut back to the left, reversed to the center and tore 70-yards."

Chicago suspended its football program in 1939. One fellow quipped "Florida did it. When Florida beat them, that was the last straw."

The starting lineup for the Gators against Chicago: Parnell (left end) Waters (left tackle), Steele (left guard), Clemons (center), McRae (right guard), Proctor (right tackle), Nolan (right end), Dorsett (quarterback), Bethea (left halfback), Sauls (right halfback), Silsby (fullback).

=== Week 5: Furman ===
Week 5: Furman at Florida

Team	1	2	3	4	Total
• Furman	0	0	7	7	14
Florida	0	7	0	6	13

- Date: October 25
- Location: Fleming Field
  Gainesville, Florida

Coach Dad Amis's Furman Purple Hurricane upset the Gators 14 to 13. Every score of the contest was made via the forward pass. A missed extra point by Florida's Parnell and one made by Furman's Allred proved to be the difference. The loss did not sit well with the alumni.

=== Week 6: at Georgia ===
Week 6: Florida at Georgia

Team	1	2	3	4	Total
Florida	0	0	0	0	0
Georgia	0	0	0	0	0

- Date: November 1
- Location: Municipal Stadium
  Savannah, Georgia

The scoreless tie with the Georgia Bulldogs provided the upset of the conference that week, as Georgia had defeated Yale and would lose just two games: to conference co-champions Alabama and Tulane. Sportswriter Lawrence Perry attributed Georgia's inability to score to its lack of using the forward pass at key intervals.

Twice Georgia backs Spurgeon Chandler, Jack Roberts, and Austin Downes threatened Florida's goal but were turned back.

The starting lineup for the Gators against Georgia: Parnell (left end) Waters (left tackle), Steele (left guard), Clemons (center), James (right guard), Proctor (right tackle), Hall (right end), Dorsett (quarterback), Bethea (left halfback), Sauls (right halfback), Jenkins (fullback).

=== Week 7: Alabama ===
The first game at Florida Field.

Week 7: Alabama at Florida

Team	1	2	3	4	Total
• Alabama	0	6	0	14	20
Florida	0	0	0	0	0

- Date: November 8
- Location: Florida Field
  Gainesville, Florida
- Game attendance: 18,000
- Referee: Arthur R. Hutchins

The seventh week of play featured the first ever game on Florida Field, which had been slated for an August opening that was delayed due to unforeseen construction challenges. The new, 22,000 seat stadium planned to eventually house 50,000.

The visiting team was Wallace Wade's Alabama Crimson Tide, and the eventual national champions spoiled Florida Field's debut by thumping the Gators 20–0. Despite the score, Florida showed much defensive strength, holding the undefeated Tide to 6 points until tiring late in the contest, with lineman Muddy Waters given praise. However, Florida's offense struggled all afternoon against an Alabama defense that would only allow 13 points all season.

The first score came when John Campbell broke through the line for 21 yards. Later, after much wear on the Gator defense, Campbell scored on a short run through center. John Tucker, a substitute, also scored on a short run. Johnny Cain was also cited as a strength for the Tide.

The starting lineup for the Gators against Alabama: Parnell (left end), Waters (left tackle), Steele (left guard), Clemons (center), Forsyth (right guard), Proctor (right tackle), Hall (right end), Dorsett (quarterback), Bethea (left halfback), Sauls (right halfback), Jenkins (fullback).

=== Week 8: Clemson ===
Using many passes, the Gators beat coach Josh Cody's Clemson Tigers 27 to 0. Two scores came on long passes from Monk Dorsett to John Hall. Coach Bachman said "Dorsett's quarterbacking has been the finest since I took charge of the 'Gators."

=== Week 9: at Georgia Tech ===
Week 9: Florida at Georgia Tech

Team	1	2	3	4	Total
• Florida	6	21	7	21	55
Ga. Tech	7	0	0	0	7

- Date: November 27
- Location: Grant Field
  Atlanta

The Gators beat coach Bill Alexander's Georgia Tech Yellow Jackets for the first time, handing them their worst defeat in years, 55 to 7. Red Bethea scored three touchdowns, Ed Sauls two, and John Hall one. After the Tech game, newspapers posted how Bethea "made the Florida fans forget there ever was a Cannonball Clyde Crabtree."

=== Week 10: Tennessee ===
Week 10: Tennessee at Florida

Team	1	2	3	4	Total
• Tennessee	0	6	0	7	13
Florida	0	0	6	0	6

- Date: December 7
- Location: Fairfield Stadium
  Jacksonville, Florida

The season's final game saw a bitterly fought contest end in a 13 to 6 loss to coach Robert Neyland's Tennessee Volunteers. Buddy Hackman scored both of Tennessee's touchdowns. Tennessee quarterback Bobby Dodd also starred.

A fake play with Vols center Gene Mayer netted 27 yards, placing the ball on Florida's 13-yard line. Dodd then passed to Hackman for the touchdown. Florida scored after a Hackman fumble put the ball on the 25-yard line. A pass to Parnell got a touchdown. In the final few minutes, Hackman won the game with a 48-yard interception return for a touchdown.

An account of Bobby Dodd's trickery: "Against Florida in 1930 he got his teammates in a huddle and told them about a play he had used in high school. When the ball was snapped, it was placed on the ground unattended. The players ran in one direction. Then the center returned, picked up the ball, and waltzed to the winning touchdown." This play would later come to be popularly known as the "fumblerooski", after Nebraska famously used it in the 1984 Orange Bowl versus Miami.

== Postseason ==
Carlos Proctor was elected captain for next season. Guard Jimmy Steele was composite All-Southern.

== Personnel ==
=== Depth chart ===
The following chart provides a visual depiction of Florida's lineup during the 1930 season with games started at the position reflected in parentheses. The chart mimics a Notre Dame Box on offense.

LE
Ed Parnell
Spurgeon Cherry

LT	LG	C	RG	RT
Muddy Waters	Jimmy Steele	Ben Clemons	Bill McRae	Carlos Proctor
Scabby Pheil	J. D. Williamson	Frank Clark	Wilbur James	Al Dodge
		Ramsey	Don Forsyth	

RE
Joe Hall
Jimmy Nolan

QB
Monk Dorsett
Red McEwen

RHB
Ed Sauls
Harvey Yancey

LHB
Red Bethea
Al Rogero

FB
Jenkins
Link Silsby

=== Line ===
Player	Position	Games started	High school	Height	Weight	Age
Tom Anderson
Spurgeon Cherry	end					
Frank Clark	center		Culver	6'1"	170	21
Ben Clemons	center		Leon	6'2"	185	24
Al Dodge	tackle					
Don Forsyth	guard					
Joe Hall	end					
Wilbur James	guard		Orlando	5'11"	186	21
Bill McRae	guard		West Palm Beach	6'1"	172	21
Jimmy Nolan	end		Duval	5'10"	170	22
Joe Norfleet	end		Newberry	6'0"	175	23
North
Ed Parnell	end					
Clarence "Scabby" Pheil	tackle		St. Petersburg			
Carlos Proctor	tackle		Hillsborough			23
Ramsey	center					
Jimmy Steele	guard		Hillsborough	6'0"	185	21
Dale Waters	tackle		Newcastle	6'2"	185	21
J. D. Williamson	guard					

=== Backfield ===
==== Starters ====
Player	Position	Games started	High school	Height	Weight	Age
Red Bethea	halfback		Riverside	5'9"	172	22
Monk Dorsett	quarterback		Duval			
Jenkins	fullback					
Al Rogero	halfback					
Ed Sauls	halfback		Leon	5'11"	185	22
Lincoln "Link" Silsby	fullback					
Harvey Yancey	halfback		Duval	5'10"	160	22

==== Subs ====
Player	Position	High school	Height	Weight	Age
Broward McClellan	fullback	Blountstown			
J. Milton "Red" McEwen	quarterback	Wauchula	5'8"	155	21
Homer Seay	halfback				

== See also ==
- 1930 College Football All-Southern Team
- 1930 College Football All-America Team
