= 1930 LSU Tigers football team =

American college football season

1930 LSU Tigers football
- Conference: Southern Conference
- Record: 6–4 (2–4 SoCon)
- Head coach: Russ Cohen (3rd season)
- MVP: J. B. Luker
- Home stadium: Tiger Stadium

1930 Southern Conference football standings
	Conf.					Overall
Team	W		L		T	W		L		T
No. 3 Alabama +	8	–	0	–	0	10	–	0	–	0
No. 11 Tulane +	5	–	0	–	0	8	–	1	–	0
No. 10 Tennessee	6	–	1	–	0	9	–	1	–	0
Duke	4	–	1	–	1	8	–	1	–	2
Vanderbilt	5	–	2	–	0	8	–	2	–	0
Maryland	4	–	2	–	0	7	–	5	–	0
Florida	4	–	2	–	1	6	–	3	–	1
North Carolina	4	–	2	–	2	5	–	3	–	2
Clemson	3	–	2	–	0	8	–	2	–	0
Georgia	3	–	2	–	1	7	–	2	–	1
Kentucky	4	–	3	–	0	5	–	3	–	0
South Carolina	4	–	3	–	0	6	–	4	–	0
VPI	2	–	3	–	1	5	–	3	–	1
Mississippi A&M	2	–	3	–	0	2	–	7	–	0
Georgia Tech	2	–	4	–	1	2	–	6	–	1
LSU	2	–	4	–	0	6	–	4	–	0
Virginia	2	–	5	–	0	4	–	6	–	0
Sewanee	1	–	4	–	0	3	–	6	–	1
NC State	1	–	5	–	0	2	–	8	–	0
Ole Miss	1	–	5	–	0	3	–	5	–	1
Auburn	1	–	6	–	0	3	–	7	–	0
Washington and Lee	0	–	4	–	1	3	–	6	–	1
VMI	0	–	5	–	0	3	–	6	–	0
+ – Conference co-champions; Rankings from Dickinson System

The 1930 LSU Tigers football team was an American football team that represented Louisiana State University (LSU) as a member of the Southern Conference during the 1930 college football season. In their third season under head coach Russ Cohen, LSU compiled a 6–4 record.

== Schedule ==
Date	Opponent	Site	Result	Attendance	Source
September 20	Dakota Wesleyan*	Tiger Stadium; Baton Rouge, LA	W 76–0		
September 27	Louisiana Tech*	Tiger Stadium; Baton Rouge, LA	W 71–0		
October 4	Southwestern Louisiana*	Tiger Stadium; Baton Rouge, LA	W 85–0		
October 11	at South Carolina	Melton Field; Columbia, SC	L 6–7		
October 18	at Mississippi A&M	Municipal Stadium; Jackson, MS (rivalry)	L 6–8		
October 25	Sewanee^{†}	Tiger Stadium; Baton Rouge, LA	W 12–0		
November 1	vs. Arkansas*	State Fair Stadium; Shreveport, LA (rivalry)	W 27–12		
November 8	Ole Miss	Tiger Stadium; Baton Rouge, LA (rivalry)	W 6–0		
November 15	at Alabama	Cramton Bowl; Montgomery, AL (rivalry)	L 0–33	5,000	
November 27	at Tulane	Tulane Stadium; New Orleans, LA (Battle for the Rag)	L 7–12	25,000–28,000	
*Non-conference game; ^{†}Homecoming
