= 1930 Vanderbilt Commodores football team =

American college football season

1930 Vanderbilt Commodores football
- Conference: Southern Conference
- Record: 8–2 (5–2 SoCon)
- Head coach: Dan McGugin (26th season)
- Captain: Joe Scheffer
- Home stadium: Dudley Field

1930 Southern Conference football standings
	Conf.					Overall
Team	W		L		T	W		L		T
No. 3 Alabama +	8	–	0	–	0	10	–	0	–	0
No. 11 Tulane +	5	–	0	–	0	8	–	1	–	0
No. 10 Tennessee	6	–	1	–	0	9	–	1	–	0
Duke	4	–	1	–	1	8	–	1	–	2
Vanderbilt	5	–	2	–	0	8	–	2	–	0
Maryland	4	–	2	–	0	7	–	5	–	0
Florida	4	–	2	–	1	6	–	3	–	1
North Carolina	4	–	2	–	2	5	–	3	–	2
Clemson	3	–	2	–	0	8	–	2	–	0
Georgia	3	–	2	–	1	7	–	2	–	1
Kentucky	4	–	3	–	0	5	–	3	–	0
South Carolina	4	–	3	–	0	6	–	4	–	0
VPI	2	–	3	–	1	5	–	3	–	1
Mississippi A&M	2	–	3	–	0	2	–	7	–	0
Georgia Tech	2	–	4	–	1	2	–	6	–	1
LSU	2	–	4	–	0	6	–	4	–	0
Virginia	2	–	5	–	0	4	–	6	–	0
Sewanee	1	–	4	–	0	3	–	6	–	1
NC State	1	–	5	–	0	2	–	8	–	0
Ole Miss	1	–	5	–	0	3	–	5	–	1
Auburn	1	–	6	–	0	3	–	7	–	0
Washington and Lee	0	–	4	–	1	3	–	6	–	1
VMI	0	–	5	–	0	3	–	6	–	0
+ – Conference co-champions; Rankings from Dickinson System

The 1930 Vanderbilt Commodores football team was an American football team that represented Vanderbilt University as a member of the Southern Conference during the 1930 college football season. In their 26th season under head coach Dan McGugin, Vanderbilt compiled an 8–2 record.

== Schedule ==
Date	Opponent	Site	Result	Attendance	Source
September 27	Chattanooga*	Dudley Field; Nashville, TN	W 39–0		
October 4	at Minnesota*	Memorial Stadium; Minneapolis, MN	W 33–7	20,000	
October 11	VPI	Dudley Field; Nashville, TN	W 40–0		
October 18	Spring Hill*	Dudley Field; Nashville, TN	W 27–6		
October 25	at Alabama	Legion Field; Birmingham, AL	L 7–12	22,000	
November 1	Ole Miss	Dudley Field; Nashville, TN (rivalry)	W 24–0		
November 8	at Georgia Tech	Grant Field; Atlanta, GA (rivalry)	W 6–0	25,000	
November 15	Tennessee	Dudley Field; Nashville, TN (rivalry)	L 0–13		
November 22	Auburn	Dudley Field; Nashville, TN	W 27–0	8,000	
November 29	Maryland	Dudley Field; Nashville, TN	W 22–7		
*Non-conference game
