= 1930 NC State Wolfpack football team =

American college football season

1930 NC State Wolfpack football
- Conference: Southern Conference
- Record: 2–8 (1–5 SoCon)
- Head coach: John Van Liew (1st season)
- Home stadium: Riddick Stadium

1930 Southern Conference football standings
	Conf.					Overall
Team	W		L		T	W		L		T
No. 3 Alabama +	8	–	0	–	0	10	–	0	–	0
No. 11 Tulane +	5	–	0	–	0	8	–	1	–	0
No. 10 Tennessee	6	–	1	–	0	9	–	1	–	0
Duke	4	–	1	–	1	8	–	1	–	2
Vanderbilt	5	–	2	–	0	8	–	2	–	0
Maryland	4	–	2	–	0	7	–	5	–	0
Florida	4	–	2	–	1	6	–	3	–	1
North Carolina	4	–	2	–	2	5	–	3	–	2
Clemson	3	–	2	–	0	8	–	2	–	0
Georgia	3	–	2	–	1	7	–	2	–	1
Kentucky	4	–	3	–	0	5	–	3	–	0
South Carolina	4	–	3	–	0	6	–	4	–	0
VPI	2	–	3	–	1	5	–	3	–	1
Mississippi A&M	2	–	3	–	0	2	–	7	–	0
Georgia Tech	2	–	4	–	1	2	–	6	–	1
LSU	2	–	4	–	0	6	–	4	–	0
Virginia	2	–	5	–	0	4	–	6	–	0
Sewanee	1	–	4	–	0	3	–	6	–	1
NC State	1	–	5	–	0	2	–	8	–	0
Ole Miss	1	–	5	–	0	3	–	5	–	1
Auburn	1	–	6	–	0	3	–	7	–	0
Washington and Lee	0	–	4	–	1	3	–	6	–	1
VMI	0	–	5	–	0	3	–	6	–	0
+ – Conference co-champions; Rankings from Dickinson System

The 1930 NC State Wolfpack football team was an American football team that represented North Carolina State University as a member of the Southern Conference (SoCon) during the 1930 college football season. In its first and only season under head coach John Van Liew, the team compiled a 2–8 record (1–5 against SoCon opponents), tied for 19th place in the conference, and was outscored by a total of 125 to 54.

== Schedule ==
Date	Opponent	Site	Result	Attendance	Source
September 20	High Point*	Riddick Stadium; Raleigh, NC	W 34–0		
September 27	vs. Davidson*	World War Memorial Stadium; Greensboro, NC	L 0–12		
October 4	vs. Florida	Plant Field; Tampa, FL	L 0–27	10,000	
October 11	vs. Clemson	Central High School Stadium; Charlotte, NC (rivalry)	L 0–27	7,000	
October 16	Wake Forest*	Riddick Stadium; Raleigh, NC (rivalry)	L 0–7		
October 25	Mississippi A&M	Riddick Stadium; Raleigh, NC	W 14–0		
November 1	vs. Presbyterian*	Memorial Stadium; Asheville, NC	L 0–2		
November 7	at North Carolina	Kenan Memorial Stadium; Chapel Hill, NC (rivalry)	L 6–13		
November 15	Duke	Riddick Stadium; Raleigh, NC (rivalry)	L 0–18		
November 22	at South Carolina	Melton Field; Columbia, SC	L 0–19	4,000	
*Non-conference game
