= 1930 South Carolina Gamecocks football team =

American college football season

1930 South Carolina Gamecocks football
- Conference: Southern Conference
- Record: 6–4 (4–3 SoCon)
- Head coach: Billy Laval (3rd season)
- Captain: R. E. Gressette
- Home stadium: Melton Field

1930 Southern Conference football standings
	Conf.					Overall
Team	W		L		T	W		L		T
No. 3 Alabama +	8	–	0	–	0	10	–	0	–	0
No. 11 Tulane +	5	–	0	–	0	8	–	1	–	0
No. 10 Tennessee	6	–	1	–	0	9	–	1	–	0
Duke	4	–	1	–	1	8	–	1	–	2
Vanderbilt	5	–	2	–	0	8	–	2	–	0
Maryland	4	–	2	–	0	7	–	5	–	0
Florida	4	–	2	–	1	6	–	3	–	1
North Carolina	4	–	2	–	2	5	–	3	–	2
Clemson	3	–	2	–	0	8	–	2	–	0
Georgia	3	–	2	–	1	7	–	2	–	1
Kentucky	4	–	3	–	0	5	–	3	–	0
South Carolina	4	–	3	–	0	6	–	4	–	0
VPI	2	–	3	–	1	5	–	3	–	1
Mississippi A&M	2	–	3	–	0	2	–	7	–	0
Georgia Tech	2	–	4	–	1	2	–	6	–	1
LSU	2	–	4	–	0	6	–	4	–	0
Virginia	2	–	5	–	0	4	–	6	–	0
Sewanee	1	–	4	–	0	3	–	6	–	1
NC State	1	–	5	–	0	2	–	8	–	0
Ole Miss	1	–	5	–	0	3	–	5	–	1
Auburn	1	–	6	–	0	3	–	7	–	0
Washington and Lee	0	–	4	–	1	3	–	6	–	1
VMI	0	–	5	–	0	3	–	6	–	0
+ – Conference co-champions; Rankings from Dickinson System

The 1930 South Carolina Gamecocks football team was an American football team that represented the University of South Carolina as a member of the Southern Conference (SoCon) during the 1930 college football season. Led by third-year head coach Billy Laval, the Gamecocks compiled an overall record of 6–4 with a mark of 4–3 in conference play, tying for 11th place in the SoCon.

== Schedule ==
Date	Opponent	Site	Result	Attendance	Source
September 20	Erskine*	Melton Field; Columbia, SC	W 19–0	4,000	
September 27	at Duke	Duke Stadium; Durham, NC	W 22–0		
October 4	at Georgia Tech	Grant Field; Atlanta, GA	L 0–45	25,000	
October 11	LSU	Melton Field; Columbia, SC	W 7–6		
October 23	Clemson	State Fairgrounds; Columbia, SC (rivalry)	L 7–20		
October 30	vs. The Citadel*	County Fairgrounds; Orangeburg, SC	W 13–0	6,500	
November 8	at Furman*	Manly Field; Greenville, SC	L 0–14	6,000	
November 15	Sewanee	Melton Field; Columbia, SC	W 14–13	5,000	
November 22	NC State	Melton Field; Columbia, SC	W 19–0	4,000	
November 27	vs. Auburn	Memorial Stadium; Columbus, GA	L 7–25		
*Non-conference game
