= 1930 Ole Miss Rebels football team =

American college football season

1930 Ole Miss Rebels football
- Conference: Southern Conference
- Record: 3–5–1 (1–5 SoCon)
- Head coach: Ed Walker (1st season)
- Home stadium: Hemingway Stadium

1930 Southern Conference football standings
	Conf.					Overall
Team	W		L		T	W		L		T
No. 3 Alabama +	8	–	0	–	0	10	–	0	–	0
No. 11 Tulane +	5	–	0	–	0	8	–	1	–	0
No. 10 Tennessee	6	–	1	–	0	9	–	1	–	0
Duke	4	–	1	–	1	8	–	1	–	2
Vanderbilt	5	–	2	–	0	8	–	2	–	0
Maryland	4	–	2	–	0	7	–	5	–	0
Florida	4	–	2	–	1	6	–	3	–	1
North Carolina	4	–	2	–	2	5	–	3	–	2
Clemson	3	–	2	–	0	8	–	2	–	0
Georgia	3	–	2	–	1	7	–	2	–	1
Kentucky	4	–	3	–	0	5	–	3	–	0
South Carolina	4	–	3	–	0	6	–	4	–	0
VPI	2	–	3	–	1	5	–	3	–	1
Mississippi A&M	2	–	3	–	0	2	–	7	–	0
Georgia Tech	2	–	4	–	1	2	–	6	–	1
LSU	2	–	4	–	0	6	–	4	–	0
Virginia	2	–	5	–	0	4	–	6	–	0
Sewanee	1	–	4	–	0	3	–	6	–	1
NC State	1	–	5	–	0	2	–	8	–	0
Ole Miss	1	–	5	–	0	3	–	5	–	1
Auburn	1	–	6	–	0	3	–	7	–	0
Washington and Lee	0	–	4	–	1	3	–	6	–	1
VMI	0	–	5	–	0	3	–	6	–	0
+ – Conference co-champions; Rankings from Dickinson System

The 1930 Ole Miss Rebels football team was an American football team that represented the University of Mississippi as a member of the Southern Conference during the 1930 college football season. In their first season under head coach Ed Walker, Ole Miss compiled a 3–5–1 record.

== Schedule ==
Date	Opponent	Site	Result	Source
September 26	Union (TN)*	Hemingway Stadium; Oxford, MS	W 64–0	
October 4	at Alabama	Denny Stadium; Tuscaloosa, AL (rivalry)	L 0–64	
October 11	at Tennessee	Shields–Watkins Field; Knoxville, TN (rivalry)	L 0–27	
October 18	Sewanee	Hemingway Stadium; Oxford, MS	L 7–13	
October 25	at Chicago*	Stagg Field; Chicago, IL	T 0–0	
November 1	at Vanderbilt	Dudley Field; Nashville, TN (rivalry)	L 0–24	
November 8	at LSU	Tiger Stadium; Baton Rouge, LA (rivalry)	L 0–6	
November 14	Southwestern (TN)*	Hemingway Stadium; Oxford, MS	W 37–6	
November 27	at Mississippi A&M	Scott Field; Starkville, MS (Egg Bowl)	W 20–0	
*Non-conference game
