= 1930 North Carolina Tar Heels football team =

American college football season

1930 North Carolina Tar Heels football
- Conference: Southern Conference
- Record: 5–3–2 (4–2–2 SoCon)
- Head coach: Chuck Collins (5th season)
- Captain: Strud Nash
- Home stadium: Kenan Memorial Stadium

1930 Southern Conference football standings
	Conf.					Overall
Team	W		L		T	W		L		T
No. 3 Alabama +	8	–	0	–	0	10	–	0	–	0
No. 11 Tulane +	5	–	0	–	0	8	–	1	–	0
No. 10 Tennessee	6	–	1	–	0	9	–	1	–	0
Duke	4	–	1	–	1	8	–	1	–	2
Vanderbilt	5	–	2	–	0	8	–	2	–	0
Maryland	4	–	2	–	0	7	–	5	–	0
Florida	4	–	2	–	1	6	–	3	–	1
North Carolina	4	–	2	–	2	5	–	3	–	2
Clemson	3	–	2	–	0	8	–	2	–	0
Georgia	3	–	2	–	1	7	–	2	–	1
Kentucky	4	–	3	–	0	5	–	3	–	0
South Carolina	4	–	3	–	0	6	–	4	–	0
VPI	2	–	3	–	1	5	–	3	–	1
Mississippi A&M	2	–	3	–	0	2	–	7	–	0
Georgia Tech	2	–	4	–	1	2	–	6	–	1
LSU	2	–	4	–	0	6	–	4	–	0
Virginia	2	–	5	–	0	4	–	6	–	0
Sewanee	1	–	4	–	0	3	–	6	–	1
NC State	1	–	5	–	0	2	–	8	–	0
Ole Miss	1	–	5	–	0	3	–	5	–	1
Auburn	1	–	6	–	0	3	–	7	–	0
Washington and Lee	0	–	4	–	1	3	–	6	–	1
VMI	0	–	5	–	0	3	–	6	–	0
+ – Conference co-champions; Rankings from Dickinson System

The 1930 North Carolina Tar Heels football team was an American football team that represented the University of North Carolina as a member of the Southern Conference during the 1930 college football season. In their fifth season under head coach Chuck Collins, North Carolina compiled an 5–3–2 record.

== Schedule ==
Date	Time	Opponent	Site	Result	Attendance	Source
September 27	2:30 p.m.	Wake Forest*	Kenan Memorial Stadium; Chapel Hill, NC (rivalry)	W 13–7	8,000	
October 4	2:30 p.m.	at VPI	Miles Stadium; Blacksburg, VA	W 39–21	5,000	
October 11	2:30 p.m.	Maryland	Kenan Memorial Stadium; Chapel Hill, NC	W 28–21	10,000	
October 18	3:00 p.m.	at Georgia	Sanford Stadium; Athens, GA	L 0–26	25,000	
October 25	3:00 p.m.	at Tennessee	Shields–Watkins Field; Knoxville, TN	L 7–9	18,000	
November 1	2:30 p.m.	Georgia Tech	Kenan Memorial Stadium; Chapel Hill, NC	T 6–6	23,000	
November 7	2:30 p.m.	NC State	Kenan Memorial Stadium; Chapel Hill, NC (rivalry)	W 13–6	10,000	
November 15	2:30 p.m.	at Davidson*	Richardson Stadium; Davidson, NC	L 6–7		
November 27	2:00 p.m.	at Virginia	Lambeth Field; Charlottesville, VA (rivalry)	W 41–0	10,000	
December 6	2:30 p.m.	Duke	Kenan Memorial Stadium; Chapel Hill, NC (rivalry)	T 0–0	18,000	
*Non-conference game; All times are in Eastern time
