= 1930 Georgia Tech Yellow Jackets football team =

American college football season

1930 Georgia Tech Yellow Jackets football
- Conference: Southern Conference
- Record: 2–6–1 (2–4–1 SoCon)
- Head coach: William Alexander (11th season)
- Offensive scheme: Jump shift
- Captain: Earl Dunlap
- Home stadium: Grant Field

1930 Southern Conference football standings
	Conf.					Overall
Team	W		L		T	W		L		T
No. 3 Alabama +	8	–	0	–	0	10	–	0	–	0
No. 11 Tulane +	5	–	0	–	0	8	–	1	–	0
No. 10 Tennessee	6	–	1	–	0	9	–	1	–	0
Duke	4	–	1	–	1	8	–	1	–	2
Vanderbilt	5	–	2	–	0	8	–	2	–	0
Maryland	4	–	2	–	0	7	–	5	–	0
Florida	4	–	2	–	1	6	–	3	–	1
North Carolina	4	–	2	–	2	5	–	3	–	2
Clemson	3	–	2	–	0	8	–	2	–	0
Georgia	3	–	2	–	1	7	–	2	–	1
Kentucky	4	–	3	–	0	5	–	3	–	0
South Carolina	4	–	3	–	0	6	–	4	–	0
VPI	2	–	3	–	1	5	–	3	–	1
Mississippi A&M	2	–	3	–	0	2	–	7	–	0
Georgia Tech	2	–	4	–	1	2	–	6	–	1
LSU	2	–	4	–	0	6	–	4	–	0
Virginia	2	–	5	–	0	4	–	6	–	0
Sewanee	1	–	4	–	0	3	–	6	–	1
NC State	1	–	5	–	0	2	–	8	–	0
Ole Miss	1	–	5	–	0	3	–	5	–	1
Auburn	1	–	6	–	0	3	–	7	–	0
Washington and Lee	0	–	4	–	1	3	–	6	–	1
VMI	0	–	5	–	0	3	–	6	–	0
+ – Conference co-champions; Rankings from Dickinson System

The 1930 Georgia Tech Yellow Jackets football team represented the Georgia Tech Golden Tornado of the Georgia Institute of Technology during the 1930 college football season. The Tornado was coached by William Alexander in his 11th year as head coach, compiling a record of 2–6–1.

== Schedule ==
Date	Opponent	Site	Result	Attendance	Source
October 4	South Carolina	Grant Field; Atlanta, GA	W 45–0	25,000	
October 12	at Carnegie Tech*	Pitt Stadium; Pittsburgh, PA	L 0–31	40,000	
October 18	Auburn	Grant Field; Atlanta, GA (rivalry)	W 14–12		
October 25	Tulane	Grant Field; Atlanta, GA	L 0–28		
November 1	at North Carolina	Kenan Memorial Stadium; Chapel Hill, NC	T 6–6	22,000	
November 8	Vanderbilt	Grant Field; Atlanta, GA (rivalry)	L 0–6	25,000	
November 15	at Penn*	Franklin Field; Philadelphia, PA	L 7–34		
November 27	Florida	Grant Field; Atlanta, GA	L 7–55		
December 6	Georgia	Grant Field; Atlanta, GA (Clean, Old-Fashioned Hate)	L 0–13	27,000	
*Non-conference game
