= 1930 Duke Blue Devils football team =

American college football season

1930 Duke Blue Devils football
- Conference: Southern Conference
- Record: 8–1–2 (4–1–1 SoCon)
- Head coach: Jimmy DeHart (5th season)
- Captain: Lee Davis
- Home stadium: Duke Stadium

1930 Southern Conference football standings
	Conf.					Overall
Team	W		L		T	W		L		T
No. 3 Alabama +	8	–	0	–	0	10	–	0	–	0
No. 11 Tulane +	5	–	0	–	0	8	–	1	–	0
No. 10 Tennessee	6	–	1	–	0	9	–	1	–	0
Duke	4	–	1	–	1	8	–	1	–	2
Vanderbilt	5	–	2	–	0	8	–	2	–	0
Maryland	4	–	2	–	0	7	–	5	–	0
Florida	4	–	2	–	1	6	–	3	–	1
North Carolina	4	–	2	–	2	5	–	3	–	2
Clemson	3	–	2	–	0	8	–	2	–	0
Georgia	3	–	2	–	1	7	–	2	–	1
Kentucky	4	–	3	–	0	5	–	3	–	0
South Carolina	4	–	3	–	0	6	–	4	–	0
VPI	2	–	3	–	1	5	–	3	–	1
Mississippi A&M	2	–	3	–	0	2	–	7	–	0
Georgia Tech	2	–	4	–	1	2	–	6	–	1
LSU	2	–	4	–	0	6	–	4	–	0
Virginia	2	–	5	–	0	4	–	6	–	0
Sewanee	1	–	4	–	0	3	–	6	–	1
NC State	1	–	5	–	0	2	–	8	–	0
Ole Miss	1	–	5	–	0	3	–	5	–	1
Auburn	1	–	6	–	0	3	–	7	–	0
Washington and Lee	0	–	4	–	1	3	–	6	–	1
VMI	0	–	5	–	0	3	–	6	–	0
+ – Conference co-champions; Rankings from Dickinson System

The 1930 Duke Blue Devils football team was an American football team that represented Duke University as a member of the Southern Conference during the 1930 college football season. In its fifth and final season under head coach Jimmy DeHart, the team compiled an 8–1–2 record (4–1–1 against conference opponents), finished in fourth place, shut out seven opponents, and outscored all opponents by a total of 147 to 48. Lee Davis was the team captain. The team played its home games at Duke Stadium in Durham, North Carolina.

== Schedule ==
Date	Opponent	Site	Result	Source
September 27	South Carolina	Duke Stadium; Durham, NC	L 0–22	
October 4	Virginia^{†}*	Duke Stadium; Durham, NC	W 32–0	
October 11	Davidson*	Duke Stadium; Durham, NC	W 12–0	
October 18	at Navy*	Thompson Stadium; Annapolis, MD	W 18–0	
October 25	at Wofford*	Snyder Field; Spartanburg, SC	W 14–0	
November 1	at Villanova*	Philadelphia Municipal Stadium; Philadelphia, PA	W 12–6	
November 8	Kentucky	Duke Stadium; Durham, NC	W 14–7	
November 15	at NC State	Riddick Stadium; Raleigh, NC (rivalry)	W 18–0	
November 22	at Wake Forest*	Gore Field; Wake Forest, NC (rivalry)	T 13–13	
November 27	Washington and Lee	Duke Stadium; Durham, NC	W 14–0	
December 6	at North Carolina	Kenan Memorial Stadium; Chapel Hill, NC (rivalry)	T 0–0	
*Non-conference game; ^{†}Homecoming
