= 1930 Maryland Aggies football team =

American college football season

1930 Maryland Aggies football
- Conference: Southern Conference
- Record: 7–5 (4–2 SoCon)
- Head coach: Curley Byrd (20th season)
- Home stadium: Byrd Stadium (original)

1930 Southern Conference football standings
	Conf.					Overall
Team	W		L		T	W		L		T
No. 3 Alabama +	8	–	0	–	0	10	–	0	–	0
No. 11 Tulane +	5	–	0	–	0	8	–	1	–	0
No. 10 Tennessee	6	–	1	–	0	9	–	1	–	0
Duke	4	–	1	–	1	8	–	1	–	2
Vanderbilt	5	–	2	–	0	8	–	2	–	0
Maryland	4	–	2	–	0	7	–	5	–	0
Florida	4	–	2	–	1	6	–	3	–	1
North Carolina	4	–	2	–	2	5	–	3	–	2
Clemson	3	–	2	–	0	8	–	2	–	0
Georgia	3	–	2	–	1	7	–	2	–	1
Kentucky	4	–	3	–	0	5	–	3	–	0
South Carolina	4	–	3	–	0	6	–	4	–	0
VPI	2	–	3	–	1	5	–	3	–	1
Mississippi A&M	2	–	3	–	0	2	–	7	–	0
Georgia Tech	2	–	4	–	1	2	–	6	–	1
LSU	2	–	4	–	0	6	–	4	–	0
Virginia	2	–	5	–	0	4	–	6	–	0
Sewanee	1	–	4	–	0	3	–	6	–	1
NC State	1	–	5	–	0	2	–	8	–	0
Ole Miss	1	–	5	–	0	3	–	5	–	1
Auburn	1	–	6	–	0	3	–	7	–	0
Washington and Lee	0	–	4	–	1	3	–	6	–	1
VMI	0	–	5	–	0	3	–	6	–	0
+ – Conference co-champions; Rankings from Dickinson System

The 1930 Maryland Aggies football team was an American football team that represented the University of Maryland in the Southern Conference (SoCon) during the 1930 college football season. In their 20th season under head coach Curley Byrd, the Aggies compiled a 7–5 record (4–2 against SoCon opponents), finished sixth place in the SoCon, and outscored their opponents by a total of 231 to 142.

== Schedule ==
Date	Opponent	Site	Result	Attendance	Source
September 27	Washington College*	Byrd Stadium; College Park, MD	W 60–6	3,000	
October 4	at Yale*	Yale Bowl; New Haven, CT	L 13–40	50,000	
October 11	at North Carolina	Kenan Memorial Stadium; Chapel Hill, NC	L 21–28	9,000	
October 18	St. John's (MD)*	Byrd Stadium; College Park, MD	W 21–13	3,500	
October 25	vs. VMI	City Stadium; Richmond, VA	W 20–0		
November 1	at Virginia	Lambeth Field; Charlottesville, VA (rivalry)	W 14–6		
November 8	Washington and Lee	Byrd Stadium; College Park, MD	W 41–7	6,000	
November 15	vs. VPI	Bain Field; Norfolk, VA	W 13–7	7,000	
November 22	at Navy*	Thompson Stadium; Annapolis, MD (rivalry)	L 0–6	23,000	
November 27	Johns Hopkins*	Byrd Stadium; College Park, MD	W 21–0	10,000	
November 29	at Vanderbilt	Dudley Field; Nashville, TN	L 7–22		
December 6	vs. Western Maryland*	Baltimore Stadium; Baltimore, MD	L 0–7		
*Non-conference game
