= 1930 Tennessee Volunteers football team =

American college football season

1930 Tennessee Volunteers football
- Conference: Southern Conference
- Record: 9–1 (6–1 SoCon)
- Head coach: Robert Neyland (5th season)
- Offensive scheme: Single-wing
- Captain: Harry Thayer
- Home stadium: Shields–Watkins Field

1930 Southern Conference football standings
| | Conf. | | | | | Overall |
| Team | W | | L | | T | W | | L | | T |
|---|---|---|---|---|---|---|---|---|---|---|
| No. 3 Alabama + | 8 | – | 0 | – | 0 | 10 | – | 0 | – | 0 |
| No. 11 Tulane + | 5 | – | 0 | – | 0 | 8 | – | 1 | – | 0 |
| No. 10 Tennessee | 6 | – | 1 | – | 0 | 9 | – | 1 | – | 0 |
| Duke | 4 | – | 1 | – | 1 | 8 | – | 1 | – | 2 |
| Vanderbilt | 5 | – | 2 | – | 0 | 8 | – | 2 | – | 0 |
| Maryland | 4 | – | 2 | – | 0 | 7 | – | 5 | – | 0 |
| Florida | 4 | – | 2 | – | 1 | 6 | – | 3 | – | 1 |
| North Carolina | 4 | – | 2 | – | 2 | 5 | – | 3 | – | 2 |
| Clemson | 3 | – | 2 | – | 0 | 8 | – | 2 | – | 0 |
| Georgia | 3 | – | 2 | – | 1 | 7 | – | 2 | – | 1 |
| Kentucky | 4 | – | 3 | – | 0 | 5 | – | 3 | – | 0 |
| South Carolina | 4 | – | 3 | – | 0 | 6 | – | 4 | – | 0 |
| VPI | 2 | – | 3 | – | 1 | 5 | – | 3 | – | 1 |
| Mississippi A&M | 2 | – | 3 | – | 0 | 2 | – | 7 | – | 0 |
| Georgia Tech | 2 | – | 4 | – | 1 | 2 | – | 6 | – | 1 |
| LSU | 2 | – | 4 | – | 0 | 6 | – | 4 | – | 0 |
| Virginia | 2 | – | 5 | – | 0 | 4 | – | 6 | – | 0 |
| Sewanee | 1 | – | 4 | – | 0 | 3 | – | 6 | – | 1 |
| NC State | 1 | – | 5 | – | 0 | 2 | – | 8 | – | 0 |
| Ole Miss | 1 | – | 5 | – | 0 | 3 | – | 5 | – | 1 |
| Auburn | 1 | – | 6 | – | 0 | 3 | – | 7 | – | 0 |
| Washington and Lee | 0 | – | 4 | – | 1 | 3 | – | 6 | – | 1 |
| VMI | 0 | – | 5 | – | 0 | 3 | – | 6 | – | 0 |
+ – Conference co-champions; Rankings from Dickinson System

The 1930 Tennessee Volunteers football team (variously "Tennessee", "UT" or the "Vols") represented the University of Tennessee in the 1930 college football season. Playing as a member of the Southern Conference (SoCon), the team was led by head coach Robert Neyland, in his fifth year, and played their home games at Shields–Watkins Field in Knoxville, Tennessee. The 1930 Vols won nine and lost one game (9–1 overall, 6–1 in the SoCon). The only loss of the season came on October 18 to eventual Rose Bowl champion, Alabama. Tennessee and Vanderbilt were the only teams to score against Alabama in 1930. The 1930 Volunteers team outscored their opponents 209 to 31 and posted seven shutouts

== Schedule ==
| Date | Opponent | Site | Result | Attendance | Source |
|---|---|---|---|---|---|
| September 27 | Maryville (TN)* | Shields–Watkins Field; Knoxville, TN | W 54–0 | | |
| October 4 | Centre* | Shields–Watkins Field; Knoxville, TN | W 18–0 | | |
| October 11 | Ole Miss | Shields–Watkins Field; Knoxville, TN (rivalry) | W 27–0 | | |
| October 18 | at Alabama | Denny Stadium; Tuscaloosa, AL (rivalry) | L 18–6 | | |
| October 25 | North Carolina^{†} | Shields–Watkins Field; Knoxville, TN | W 9–7 | 18,000 | |
| November 1 | Clemson | Shields–Watkins Field; Knoxville, TN | W 27–0 | | |
| November 8 | Carson–Newman* | Shields–Watkins Field; Knoxville, TN | W 34–0 | | |
| November 15 | at Vanderbilt | Dudley Field; Nashville, TN (rivalry) | W 13–0 | | |
| November 27 | Kentucky | Shields–Watkins Field; Knoxville, TN (rivalry) | W 8–0 | 25,000 | |
| December 6 | at Florida | Fairfield Stadium; Jacksonville, FL (rivalry) | W 13–6 | | |
*Non-conference game; ^{†}Homecoming

== Players ==
=== Line ===
| Number | Player | Position | Games started | Hometown | Prep school | Height | Weight | Age |
|---|---|---|---|---|---|---|---|---|
| 11 | Malcolm Aitken | tackle | | | | | 202 | |
| 51 | Thomas Bounds | tackle | | | | | | |
| 31 | Fritz Brandt | end | | Erwin, Tennessee | | | | 21 |
| 30 | Herbert Brown | guard | | | | | | |
| 33 | James Clemmer | end | | | | | | |
| 50 | Oscar Derryberry | tackle | | | | | | |
| 60 | James Eldridge | tackle | | | | | | |
| 37 | John Franklin | guard | | | | | | |
| 45 | Herman Hickman | guard | | Johnson City, Tennessee | Baylor School | 5'10" | 225 | 19 |
| 25 | Laird Holt | end | | | | | | |
| 26 | Paul Hug | end | | Kingsport, Tennessee | Kingsport High | | 172 | 24 |
| 20 | Eugene S. Mayer | tackle | | | | | | |
| 35 | C. L. McPherson | end | | | | | | |
| 47 | David K. Mitchell | center | | | | | | |
| 39 | Virgil Rayburn | end | | Pulaski, Tennessee | Dyersburg High | 6'1" | 180 | 20 |
| 56 | Ben Redman | guard | | | | | | |
| 23 | Louis Roberts | center | | | | | | |
| 42 | Ray Saunders | tackle | | | | 6'0" | 184 | 20 |
| 49 | Francis Shull | end | | | | | | |
| 22 | J. Ralph Still | tackle | | | | | | |
| 41 | Charles Talbot | end | | | | | | |
| 34 | Conrad Templeton | guard | | | | | | |
| 24 | Harry Thayer | guard | | | | | | |

=== Backfield ===
| Number | Player | Position | Games started | Hometown | Prep school | Height | Weight | Age |
|---|---|---|---|---|---|---|---|---|
| 14 | John Allen | halfback | | | | | | |
| 43 | Deke Brackett | halfback | | | | | | |
| 40 | William G. Cox | fullback | | | | | | |
| 13 | Quinn Decker | fullback | | | | | | |
| 16 | Theodore Disney | halfback | | | | | | |
| 17 | Bobby Dodd | quarterback | | Kingsport, Tennessee | Kingsport High | 6'1" | 170 | 22 |
| 12 | Hugh Faust | quarterback | | | | | | |
| 44 | Charles Gillespie | halfback | | | | | | |
| 15 | Buddy Hackman | halfback | | Nashville, Tennessee | Hume-Fogg High | 5'11" | 175 | 24 |
| 27 | Paul D. Heydrick | halfback | | | | | | |
| 18 | Charles Kohlhase | fullback | | | | | | |
| 28 | Gene McEver | halfback | | Bristol, Virginia | Bristol High | 5'10" | 185 | 22 |
| 38 | Charles Reineke | quarterback | | | | | | |
| 19 | Harvey Robinson | halfback | | | | | | |

=== Unlisted ===
| Number | Player | Position | Games started | Hometown | Prep school | Height | Weight | Age |
|---|---|---|---|---|---|---|---|---|
| 36 | David Blumberg | | | | | | | |
| 59 | Kenneth Driskell | | | | | | | |
| 61 | Henry Foutch | | | | | | | |
| 58 | Robert Green | | | | | | | |
| 55 | Powell McWhirter | | | | | | | |
| 21 | Gordon Moore | | | | | | | |
| 48 | Cyrus Rankin | | | | | | | |
| 52 | Hoyt Smiley | | | | | | | |
| 53 | Robert Warfield | | | | | | | |
