= John Van Liew =

American football and basketball coach

- Van Liew pictured in The Agromeck 1931, NC State yearbook

Biographical details
- Born: December 12, 1881; Ottumwa, Iowa, U.S.
- Died: December 7, 1959 (aged 77); Mooresville, Indiana, U.S.

Coaching career (HC unless noted)

Football
- 1923–1926: Knox (IL)
- 1927: Western State (CO)
- 1930: NC State
- 1932–1942: Hanover

Basketball
- 1923–1926: Knox (IL)
- 1932–1942: Hanover

Administrative career (AD unless noted)
- 1932–1943: Hanover

Head coaching record
- Overall: 57–77–3 (football); 100–104 (basketball)

Accomplishments and honors

Championships
- Football; 1 IIAC (1924); 1 MWC (1924)

John Michael Van Liew (December 12, 1881 – December 7, 1959) was an American football and basketball coach. He served as the head football coach at Knox College in Galesburg, Illinois from 1923 to 1926, at Western State College of Colorado—now known as Western Colorado University—in 1927, at North Carolina State University in 1930, and at Hanover College from 1932 to 1942, compiling a career college football record of 57–77–3. Van Liew was also the head basketball coach at Knox from 1923 to 1926 and Hanover from 1932 to 1942, tallying a career college basketball mark of 100–104. Van Liew was a graduate of Grinnell College.

== Head coaching record ==
=== Football ===
Year	Team	Overall	Conference	Standing	Bowl/playoffs
Knox Old Siwash (Illinois Intercollegiate Athletic Conference / Midwest Conference) (1923–1926)
1923	Knox	5–4	4–1 / 2–2	3rd / T–4th	
1924	Knox	7–1	4–0 / 3–0	T–1st / T–1st	
1925	Knox	2–6	2–1 / 0–3	T–5th / T–6th	
1926	Knox	2–5–1	1–3–1 / 1–2	T–16th / T–7th	
Knox:		16–16–1			
Western State Mountaineers (Rocky Mountain Conference) (1927)
1927	Western State	1–6	1–5	11th	
Western State:		1–6	1–5		
NC State Wolfpack (Southern Conference) (1930)
1930	NC State	2–8	1–5	T–19th	
NC State:		2–8	1–5		
Hanover Panthers (Indiana Intercollegiate Conference) (1932–1942)
1932	Hanover	4–3–1			
1933	Hanover	6–2	5–1	4th	
1934	Hanover	7–2	4–1	T–3rd	
1935	Hanover	2–5–1	2–3	10th	
1936	Hanover	1–6	1–3	T–11th	
1937	Hanover	5–3	4–2	T–5th	
1938	Hanover	5–2	4–2	T–4th	
1939	Hanover	4–4	3–3	8th	
1940	Hanover	1–8	1–4	T–11th	
1941	Hanover	1–7	1–3	11th	
1942	Hanover	2–5	2–3	8th	
Hanover:		38–47–2			
Total:		57–77–3			
