= 1930 Virginia Cavaliers football team =

American college football season

1930 Virginia Cavaliers football
- Conference: Southern Conference
- Record: 4–6 (2–5 SoCon)
- Head coach: Earl Abell (2nd season)
- Home stadium: Lambeth Field

1930 Southern Conference football standings
	Conf.					Overall
Team	W		L		T	W		L		T
No. 3 Alabama +	8	–	0	–	0	10	–	0	–	0
No. 11 Tulane +	5	–	0	–	0	8	–	1	–	0
No. 10 Tennessee	6	–	1	–	0	9	–	1	–	0
Duke	4	–	1	–	1	8	–	1	–	2
Vanderbilt	5	–	2	–	0	8	–	2	–	0
Maryland	4	–	2	–	0	7	–	5	–	0
Florida	4	–	2	–	1	6	–	3	–	1
North Carolina	4	–	2	–	2	5	–	3	–	2
Clemson	3	–	2	–	0	8	–	2	–	0
Georgia	3	–	2	–	1	7	–	2	–	1
Kentucky	4	–	3	–	0	5	–	3	–	0
South Carolina	4	–	3	–	0	6	–	4	–	0
VPI	2	–	3	–	1	5	–	3	–	1
Mississippi A&M	2	–	3	–	0	2	–	7	–	0
Georgia Tech	2	–	4	–	1	2	–	6	–	1
LSU	2	–	4	–	0	6	–	4	–	0
Virginia	2	–	5	–	0	4	–	6	–	0
Sewanee	1	–	4	–	0	3	–	6	–	1
NC State	1	–	5	–	0	2	–	8	–	0
Ole Miss	1	–	5	–	0	3	–	5	–	1
Auburn	1	–	6	–	0	3	–	7	–	0
Washington and Lee	0	–	4	–	1	3	–	6	–	1
VMI	0	–	5	–	0	3	–	6	–	0
+ – Conference co-champions; Rankings from Dickinson System

The 1930 Virginia Cavaliers football team was an American football team that represented the University of Virginia as a member of the Southern Conference during the 1930 college football season. In their second season under head coach Earl Abell, Virginia compiled an 4–6 record.

== Schedule ==
Date	Opponent	Site	Result	Attendance	Source
September 20	Roanoke*	Lambeth Field; Charlottesville, VA	W 37–0		
September 27	Randolph–Macon*	Lambeth Field; Charlottesville, VA	W 48–0		
October 4	at Duke	Duke Stadium; Durham, NC	L 0–32		
October 11	at Penn*	Franklin Field; Philadelphia, PA	L 6–40		
October 18	at VMI	Alumni Field; Lexington, VA	W 13–0		
October 25	at Kentucky	McLean Stadium; Lexington, KY	L 0–47		
November 1	Maryland	Lambeth Field; Charlottesville, VA (rivalry)	L 6–14		
November 8	at VPI	Miles Stadium; Blacksburg, VA (rivalry)	L 13–34		
November 15	Washington and Lee^{†}	Lambeth Field; Charlottesville, VA	W 21–7		
November 27	North Carolina	Lambeth Field; Charlottesville, VA (rivalry)	L 0–41	10,000	
*Non-conference game; ^{†}Homecoming
