= 1930 Mississippi A&M Aggies football team =

American college football season

1930 Mississippi A&M Aggies football
- Conference: Southern Conference
- Record: 2–7 (2–3 SoCon)
- Head coach: Red Cagle (1st season)
- Home stadium: Scott Field

1930 Southern Conference football standings
	Conf.					Overall
Team	W		L		T	W		L		T
No. 3 Alabama +	8	–	0	–	0	10	–	0	–	0
No. 11 Tulane +	5	–	0	–	0	8	–	1	–	0
No. 10 Tennessee	6	–	1	–	0	9	–	1	–	0
Duke	4	–	1	–	1	8	–	1	–	2
Vanderbilt	5	–	2	–	0	8	–	2	–	0
Maryland	4	–	2	–	0	7	–	5	–	0
Florida	4	–	2	–	1	6	–	3	–	1
North Carolina	4	–	2	–	2	5	–	3	–	2
Clemson	3	–	2	–	0	8	–	2	–	0
Georgia	3	–	2	–	1	7	–	2	–	1
Kentucky	4	–	3	–	0	5	–	3	–	0
South Carolina	4	–	3	–	0	6	–	4	–	0
VPI	2	–	3	–	1	5	–	3	–	1
Mississippi A&M	2	–	3	–	0	2	–	7	–	0
Georgia Tech	2	–	4	–	1	2	–	6	–	1
LSU	2	–	4	–	0	6	–	4	–	0
Virginia	2	–	5	–	0	4	–	6	–	0
Sewanee	1	–	4	–	0	3	–	6	–	1
NC State	1	–	5	–	0	2	–	8	–	0
Ole Miss	1	–	5	–	0	3	–	5	–	1
Auburn	1	–	6	–	0	3	–	7	–	0
Washington and Lee	0	–	4	–	1	3	–	6	–	1
VMI	0	–	5	–	0	3	–	6	–	0
+ – Conference co-champions; Rankings from Dickinson System

The 1930 Mississippi A&M Aggies football team was an American football team that represented the Agricultural and Mechanical College of the State of Mississippi (now known as Mississippi State University) as a member of the Southern Conference during the 1930 college football season. In their first season under head coach Red Cagle, Mississippi A&M compiled a 2–7 record.

== Schedule ==
Date	Opponent	Site	Result	Source
September 27	Southwestern (TN)*	Scott Field; Starkville, MS	L 0–14	
October 4	at Mississippi College*	Municipal Stadium; Jackson, MS	L 12–13	
October 10	Millsaps*	Scott Field; Starkville, MS	L 13–19	
October 18	LSU	Municipal Stadium; Jackson, MS (rivalry)	W 8–6	
October 25	at NC State	Riddick Stadium; Raleigh, NC	L 0–14	
November 1	at Tulane	Tulane Stadium; New Orleans, LA	L 0–53	
November 8	Henderson State*	Scott Field; Starkville, MS	L 7–25	
November 15	at Auburn	Legion Field; Birmingham, AL	W 7–6	
November 27	Ole Miss	Scott Field; Starkville, MS (Egg Bowl)	L 0–20	
*Non-conference game
