= 1930 Georgia Bulldogs football team =

American college football season

1930 Georgia Bulldogs football
- Conference: Southern Conference
- Record: 7–2–1 (3–2–1 SoCon)
- Head coach: Harry Mehre (3rd season)
- Captain: Herb Maffett
- Home stadium: Sanford Stadium

Uniform
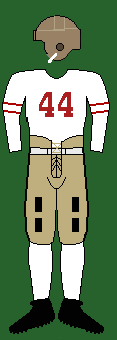

1930 Southern Conference football standings
	Conf.					Overall
Team	W		L		T	W		L		T
No. 3 Alabama +	8	–	0	–	0	10	–	0	–	0
No. 11 Tulane +	5	–	0	–	0	8	–	1	–	0
No. 10 Tennessee	6	–	1	–	0	9	–	1	–	0
Duke	4	–	1	–	1	8	–	1	–	2
Vanderbilt	5	–	2	–	0	8	–	2	–	0
Maryland	4	–	2	–	0	7	–	5	–	0
Florida	4	–	2	–	1	6	–	3	–	1
North Carolina	4	–	2	–	2	5	–	3	–	2
Clemson	3	–	2	–	0	8	–	2	–	0
Georgia	3	–	2	–	1	7	–	2	–	1
Kentucky	4	–	3	–	0	5	–	3	–	0
South Carolina	4	–	3	–	0	6	–	4	–	0
VPI	2	–	3	–	1	5	–	3	–	1
Mississippi A&M	2	–	3	–	0	2	–	7	–	0
Georgia Tech	2	–	4	–	1	2	–	6	–	1
LSU	2	–	4	–	0	6	–	4	–	0
Virginia	2	–	5	–	0	4	–	6	–	0
Sewanee	1	–	4	–	0	3	–	6	–	1
NC State	1	–	5	–	0	2	–	8	–	0
Ole Miss	1	–	5	–	0	3	–	5	–	1
Auburn	1	–	6	–	0	3	–	7	–	0
Washington and Lee	0	–	4	–	1	3	–	6	–	1
VMI	0	–	5	–	0	3	–	6	–	0
+ – Conference co-champions; Rankings from Dickinson System

The 1930 Georgia Bulldogs football team represented the University of Georgia during the 1930 college football season. The Bulldogs completed the season with a 7–2–1 record.

== Schedule ==
Date	Opponent	Site	Result	Attendance	Source
September 27	Oglethorpe*	Sanford Stadium; Athens, GA	W 31–6		
October 4	Mercer*	Sanford Stadium; Athens, GA	W 51–0		
October 11	at Yale*	Yale Bowl; New Haven, CT	W 18–14	45,000	
October 18	North Carolina^{†}	Sanford Stadium; Athens, GA	W 26–0	15,000	
October 25	vs. Auburn	Memorial Stadium; Columbus, GA (Deep South's Oldest Rivalry)	W 39–7		
November 1	vs. Florida	Municipal Stadium; Savannah, GA (rivalry)	T 0–0		
November 8	at NYU*	Polo Grounds; New York, NY	W 7–6	45,000	
November 15	at Tulane	Tulane Stadium; New Orleans, LA	L 0–25		
November 27	at Alabama	Legion Field; Birmingham, AL (rivalry)	L 0–13	28,000	
December 6	at Georgia Tech	Grant Field; Atlanta, GA (Clean, Old-Fashioned Hate)	W 13–0	27,000	
*Non-conference game; ^{†}Homecoming

== Players ==
=== Line ===
Number	Player	Position
29	McCarthy Crenshaw	End
17	Jim Hamrick	Tackle
27	Billy Hazelhurst	Guard
13	Milton Leathers	Guard
11	Ralph Maddox	Guard
10	Herb Maffett	End
24	Fred Miller	End
14	Bobby Rose	Tackle
9	Vernon "Catfish" Smith	End
15	Spero Tassapoulas	Center

=== Backfield ===
Number	Player	Position
8	Spurgeon Chandler	Halfback
6	Marion Dickens	Halfback
1	Austin Downes	Quarterback
18	Lloyd Gilmore	Fullback
19	Homer Key	Halfback
4	Moran	Quarterback
2	Buster Mott	Halfback
7	Jack Roberts	Fullback
26	Wendell "Sully" Sullivan	Quarterback
21	Leroy Young	Quarterback

=== Unlisted ===
Number	Player
3	Weddington Kelly
5	John Davidson
12	J. McWhorter
16	Lynn
20	Armin Waugh
22	Hamilton
23	Hardin
25	Jasper Bennett
28	James Stoinoff
30	James Patterson
32	Thornton
34	Collins
35	Ed Davis
36	Reynolds
