= 1930 Auburn Tigers football team =

American college football season

1930 Auburn Tigers football
- Conference: Southern Conference
- Record: 3–7 (1–6 SoCon)
- Head coach: Chet A. Wynne (1st season)
- Captain: C. D. Harkins
- Home stadium: Drake Field; Legion Field; Cramton Bowl

1930 Southern Conference football standings
	Conf.					Overall
Team	W		L		T	W		L		T
No. 3 Alabama +	8	–	0	–	0	10	–	0	–	0
No. 11 Tulane +	5	–	0	–	0	8	–	1	–	0
No. 10 Tennessee	6	–	1	–	0	9	–	1	–	0
Duke	4	–	1	–	1	8	–	1	–	2
Vanderbilt	5	–	2	–	0	8	–	2	–	0
Maryland	4	–	2	–	0	7	–	5	–	0
Florida	4	–	2	–	1	6	–	3	–	1
North Carolina	4	–	2	–	2	5	–	3	–	2
Clemson	3	–	2	–	0	8	–	2	–	0
Georgia	3	–	2	–	1	7	–	2	–	1
Kentucky	4	–	3	–	0	5	–	3	–	0
South Carolina	4	–	3	–	0	6	–	4	–	0
VPI	2	–	3	–	1	5	–	3	–	1
Mississippi A&M	2	–	3	–	0	2	–	7	–	0
Georgia Tech	2	–	4	–	1	2	–	6	–	1
LSU	2	–	4	–	0	6	–	4	–	0
Virginia	2	–	5	–	0	4	–	6	–	0
Sewanee	1	–	4	–	0	3	–	6	–	1
NC State	1	–	5	–	0	2	–	8	–	0
Ole Miss	1	–	5	–	0	3	–	5	–	1
Auburn	1	–	6	–	0	3	–	7	–	0
Washington and Lee	0	–	4	–	1	3	–	6	–	1
VMI	0	–	5	–	0	3	–	6	–	0
+ – Conference co-champions; Rankings from Dickinson System

The 1930 Auburn Tigers football team represented Auburn University in the 1930 college football season as a member of the Southern Conference (SoCon). Led by first-year head coach Chet A. Wynne, Auburn finished the season with a record of 3–7 overall and 1–6 in SoCon play, placing 21st.

== Schedule ==
Date	Opponent	Site	Result	Attendance	Source
September 26	Birmingham–Southern*	Cramton Bowl; Montgomery, AL	L 0–7	9,000	
October 4	Spring Hill*	Drake Field; Auburn, AL	W 13–0		
October 11	vs. Florida	Fairfield Stadium; Jacksonville, FL (rivalry)	L 0–7		
October 18	at Georgia Tech	Grant Field; Atlanta, GA (rivalry)	L 12–14		
October 25	vs. Georgia	Memorial Stadium; Columbus, GA (Deep South's Oldest Rivalry)	L 7–39		
November 1	Wofford*	Drake Field; Auburn, AL	W 38–6		
November 8	at Tulane	Tulane Stadium; New Orleans, LA (rivalry)	L 0–21		
November 15	Mississippi A&M	Legion Field; Birmingham, AL	L 6–7		
November 22	at Vanderbilt	Dudley Field; Nashville, TN	L 0–27	8,000	
November 27	vs. South Carolina	Memorial Stadium; Columbus, GA	W 25–7		
*Non-conference game
