= 1930 Washington and Lee Generals football team =

American college football season

1930 Washington and Lee Generals football
- Conference: Southern Conference
- Record: 3–6–1 (0–4–1 SoCon)
- Head coach: Eugene Oberst (2nd season)
- Home stadium: Wilson Field

1930 Southern Conference football standings
	Conf.					Overall
Team	W		L		T	W		L		T
No. 3 Alabama +	8	–	0	–	0	10	–	0	–	0
No. 11 Tulane +	5	–	0	–	0	8	–	1	–	0
No. 10 Tennessee	6	–	1	–	0	9	–	1	–	0
Duke	4	–	1	–	1	8	–	1	–	2
Vanderbilt	5	–	2	–	0	8	–	2	–	0
Maryland	4	–	2	–	0	7	–	5	–	0
Florida	4	–	2	–	1	6	–	3	–	1
North Carolina	4	–	2	–	2	5	–	3	–	2
Clemson	3	–	2	–	0	8	–	2	–	0
Georgia	3	–	2	–	1	7	–	2	–	1
Kentucky	4	–	3	–	0	5	–	3	–	0
South Carolina	4	–	3	–	0	6	–	4	–	0
VPI	2	–	3	–	1	5	–	3	–	1
Mississippi A&M	2	–	3	–	0	2	–	7	–	0
Georgia Tech	2	–	4	–	1	2	–	6	–	1
LSU	2	–	4	–	0	6	–	4	–	0
Virginia	2	–	5	–	0	4	–	6	–	0
Sewanee	1	–	4	–	0	3	–	6	–	1
NC State	1	–	5	–	0	2	–	8	–	0
Ole Miss	1	–	5	–	0	3	–	5	–	1
Auburn	1	–	6	–	0	3	–	7	–	0
Washington and Lee	0	–	4	–	1	3	–	6	–	1
VMI	0	–	5	–	0	3	–	6	–	0
+ – Conference co-champions; Rankings from Dickinson System

The 1930 Washington and Lee Generals football team was an American football team that represented Washington and Lee University during the 1930 college football season as a member of the Southern Conference. In their second year under head coach Eugene Oberst, the team compiled an overall record of 3–6–1, with a mark of 0–4–1 in conference play, finishing in 22nd place in the SoCon.

== Schedule ==
Date	Opponent	Site	Result	Attendance	Source
September 20	Randolph–Macon*	Wilson Field; Lexington, VA	W 32–0		
September 28	vs. Hampden–Sydney*	Stadium Field; Lynchburg, VA	W 15–0		
October 4	at Richmond*	City Stadium; Richmond, VA	W 14–0	4,000	
October 11	vs. West Virginia*	Laidley Field; Charleston, WV	L 13–33	14,000	
October 18	at Kentucky	Stoll Field; Lexington, KY	L 14–33		
October 25	St. John's (MD)*	Wilson Field; Lexington, VA	L 0–7		
November 1	VPI	Wilson Field; Lexington, VA	T 0–0	4,000	
November 8	at Maryland	Byrd Stadium; College Park, MD	L 7–41	6,000	
November 15	at Virginia	Lambeth Field; Charlottesville, VA	L 7–21		
November 27	at Duke	Duke Stadium; Durham, NC	L 0–14		
*Non-conference game
