= Spurgeon Cherry =

American football and basketball player and coach

- Cherry in 1961

Biographical details
- Born: c. 1912; Florida, U.S.
- Died: June 1968; Gainesville, Florida, U.S.

Playing career

Football
- 1930–1932: Florida
- Position: End (football)

Coaching career (HC unless noted)

Football
- 1939–1941: Hillsborough High
- ?: Florida (assistant)

Basketball
- 1942–1943: Florida
- 1944–1946: Florida

Henry Spurgeon Cherry Jr. (c. 1912 – June 1968) was an American football and basketball player and coach for the Florida Gators; the first chairman of the Department of Intramural Athletics and Recreation at the University of Florida, in 1946. He played as an end on the football team for coach Charlie Bachman from 1930 to 1932. Cherry coached the Gators basketball team in the 1940s. Cherry was coach of the Hillsborough High Terriers football team from 1939 to 1941.
