= Childress, Virginia =

Childress, Virginia may refer to the following places in Virginia:

- Childress, Goochland County, Virginia
- Childress, Montgomery County, Virginia
