= Red Bethea =

American football player (1905–1986)

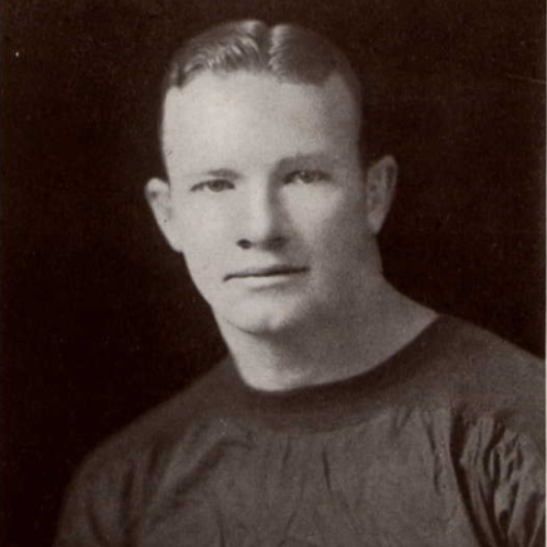
- Bethea from 1931 Seminole yearbook

No. 48; 44
- Position: Halfback

Personal information
- Born: January 11, 1905; Trenton, Florida, U.S.
- Died: September 11, 1986 (aged 81); St. Augustine, Florida, U.S.

Career information
- High school: Riverside
- College: Florida (1927–1930)

Awards and highlights
- All-Southern (1930); Second-team All-American (1930); Florida Gators single-game rushing record (218 yards, 1930); University of Florida Athletic Hall of Fame

Lee Roy "Red" Bethea (January 11, 1905 – September 11, 1986), sometimes referenced as Leroy Bethea, was an American football player. He played at the halfback position at the University of Florida and set the Florida Gators football single-game record with 218 rushing yards against the University of Chicago in 1930. His single-game rushing record stood until 1987. He was also selected as a second-team halfback on the 1930 College Football All-America Team.

== Early life and ancestry ==
Lee Roy Bethea was born in 1905 to Giles and Malinda Bethea in a farming community in Trenton, Florida. The Bethea family migrated from South Carolina to north central Florida shortly after the U.S. Civil War. The family name Bethea traces its origin to French Protestant Huguenots who fled from France to England following the Edict of Fontainebleau and went on to settle in the colony of Virginia around the year 1700.

== University of Florida ==
Bethea enrolled at the University of Florida in nearby Gainesville, Florida, where he played at the halfback position for coach Charlie Bachman's Florida Gators football team from 1928 to 1930.

=== 1928 ===
Bethea's first year on the varsity was as a member of the famous 1928 backfield. He scored the first touchdown in a 71 to 6 beatdown of Sewanee, and the first touchdown in a victory over Georgia. In the victory over Clemson, Bethea "looked for all the world like the famous Red Grange" according to Associated Press (AP) staff writer Benton E. Jacobs.

=== 1929 ===
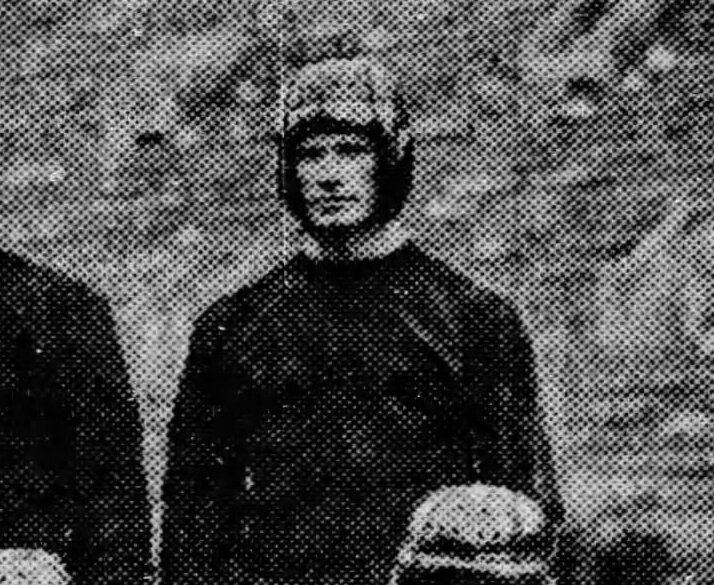
Bethea in-uniform during the 1929 football season

During the 1929 season, Bethea was considered "Florida's most consistent ball carrier" and "perhaps the niftiest runner in the conference." High praise for the conference with Gene McEver. The Miami Daily News wrote that Bethea had "speed, rhythm and power in his movement and stopping him is not easy." He helped lead the 1929 Gators to an 8–2 record and gained 79 yards on 17 attempts in the Dixie All-Star game held in Atlanta on New Year's Day in 1930.

=== 1930 ===
The following year, Bethea was team captain of the 1930 Gators squad that compiled a 6–3–1 record. The high point of Bethea's career was Florida's 19–0 victory on October 18, 1930, over a University of Chicago team coached by Amos Alonzo Stagg. The victory was historic for the Florida football program, representing the first time the Gators had won an inter-sectional game outside the South. The Gators had previously lost all six games it had played in the North—to Indiana in 1916, Harvard in 1922 and 1929, Army in 1923 and 1924, and Chicago in 1926. Bethea was the star of the historic victory over Chicago, rushing for a Florida single-game record of 218 yards. The Associated Press called Bethea Florida's "siege gun," and noted that his rushing total was "better than the whole Chicago backfield." At the end of the 1930 season, the Central Press Association selected Bethea as a second-team All-American based on votes cast by 200 captains of college football teams polled in a nationwide survey.

== Later life ==
In the early 1930s, Bethea coached football at the Florida Military Academy. He left that position in August 1933 to attend to his business interests in Gainesville and Cedar Key. Bethea owned a farm in Hastings, Florida in his later years. He was inducted into the University of Florida Athletic Hall of Fame as a "Gator Great" in April 1986. He died five months later in September 1986. In September 1987, one year after Bethea's death, Emmitt Smith rushed for 224 yards in his first collegiate start, breaking the Florida single-game rushing record set by Bethea 57 years earlier.

== See also ==
- 1930 College Football All-America Team
- List of Florida Gators football All-Americans
- List of University of Florida Athletic Hall of Fame members
