= Jack Holland (boxer) =

American boxer, college football player

Personal information
- Born: c. 1909 Shreveport, Louisiana
- Died: May 9, 1933 New Orleans, Louisiana
- Weight: Light heavyweight

Boxing career

Boxing record
- Total fights: 4
- Wins: 3
- Losses: 1
- Draws: 0
- No contests: 0

Rhule "Jack" Holland (c. 1909 – May 9, 1933) was an American professional boxer and college football player. He died of injuries suffered during a boxing match.

== Tulane University ==
Holland was a prominent end for the Tulane Green Wave football teams of Tulane University, playing alongside College Football Hall of Fame inductee Jerry Dalrymple. He played in the Tulane All Star football game January 1, 1933. Following his death, his team number at Tulane (21) was retired for five years in his honor.

=== Football ===
==== 1929 ====
Holland was a member of the undefeated Southern Conference champion 1929 team. He was selected All-Southern.

== Boxing ==
Holland turned to professional boxing with the intent to earn money to finish his Tulane degree, with the ultimate intent of coaching high school football. He also worked as an artist's model to pay his way through school. He once won a Southern A. A. U. light heavyweight boxing title in 1932.

=== Death ===
Holland died May 9, 1933, of a cerebral hemorrhage after losing in six rounds to Tony Marullo. As he was climbing through the ropes to go to the dressing room, ringsiders heard him say: "I butted him." Then he collapsed.
