= 1930 Clemson Tigers football team =

American college football season

1930 Clemson Tigers football

State champion
- Conference: Southern Conference
- Record: 8–2 (3–2 SoCon)
- Head coach: Josh Cody (4th season)
- Captain: Johnnie Justus
- Home stadium: Riggs Field

1930 Southern Conference football standings
	Conf.					Overall
Team	W		L		T	W		L		T
No. 3 Alabama +	8	–	0	–	0	10	–	0	–	0
No. 11 Tulane +	5	–	0	–	0	8	–	1	–	0
No. 10 Tennessee	6	–	1	–	0	9	–	1	–	0
Duke	4	–	1	–	1	8	–	1	–	2
Vanderbilt	5	–	2	–	0	8	–	2	–	0
Maryland	4	–	2	–	0	7	–	5	–	0
Florida	4	–	2	–	1	6	–	3	–	1
North Carolina	4	–	2	–	2	5	–	3	–	2
Clemson	3	–	2	–	0	8	–	2	–	0
Georgia	3	–	2	–	1	7	–	2	–	1
Kentucky	4	–	3	–	0	5	–	3	–	0
South Carolina	4	–	3	–	0	6	–	4	–	0
VPI	2	–	3	–	1	5	–	3	–	1
Mississippi A&M	2	–	3	–	0	2	–	7	–	0
Georgia Tech	2	–	4	–	1	2	–	6	–	1
LSU	2	–	4	–	0	6	–	4	–	0
Virginia	2	–	5	–	0	4	–	6	–	0
Sewanee	1	–	4	–	0	3	–	6	–	1
NC State	1	–	5	–	0	2	–	8	–	0
Ole Miss	1	–	5	–	0	3	–	5	–	1
Auburn	1	–	6	–	0	3	–	7	–	0
Washington and Lee	0	–	4	–	1	3	–	6	–	1
VMI	0	–	5	–	0	3	–	6	–	0
+ – Conference co-champions; Rankings from Dickinson System

The 1930 Clemson Tigers football team was an American football team Clemson College—now known as Clemson University—as a member of the Southern Conference (SoCon) during the 1930 college football season. In their fourth and final season under head coach Josh Cody, the Tigers compiled an 8–2 record (3–2 against conference opponents), finished ninth in the conference, and outscored opponents by a total of 239 to 82.

Right halfback Johnnie Justus was the team captain. Four Clemson players were selected as first-team players on the 1930 All-Southern Conference football team: center Red Fordham; guard Mule Yarborough; and quarterback Maxcy Welch and left halfback Grady Salley.

After the season, Josh Cody resigned as Clemson's head coach to accept an assistant coaching job under Dan McGugin at Vanderbilt.

== Schedule ==
Date	Opponent	Site	Result	Attendance	Source
September 20	Presbyterian*	Riggs Field; Clemson, SC	W 28–7		
September 27	Wofford*	Riggs Field; Clemson, SC	W 32–0		
October 3	vs. The Citadel*	Florence Memorial Stadium; Florence, SC	W 13–7	5,000	
October 11	vs. NC State	Central High School Stadium; Charlotte, NC (rivalry)	W 27–0	7,000	
October 17	Newberry*	Riggs Field; Clemson, SC	W 75–0		
October 23	at South Carolina	State Fairgrounds; Columbia, SC (rivalry)	W 20–7	15,000	
November 1	at Tennessee	Shields–Watkins Field; Knoxville, TN	L 0–27		
November 8	vs. VMI	Bain Field; Norfolk, VA	W 32–0		
November 15	at Florida	Fairfield Stadium; Jacksonville, FL	L 0–27		
November 27	at Furman*	Manly Field; Greenville, SC	W 12–7	12,000	
*Non-conference game
