= Wop Glover =

American football player and coach

Playing career
- 1929–1931: Tulane
- Position: Halfback

Coaching career (HC unless noted)
- 1932-?: John Carroll (assistant)
- 1937: Saint Stanislaus College

Harry "Wop" Glover was an AMerican college football player and coach. He attended University preparatory school at Saint Stanislaus College, playing for the "Rock-a-chaws." Glover played for the Tulane Green Wave football team, once the team's leading rusher in a Rose Bowl. He is in the Tulane Hall of Fame. He won the Porter Cup in 1930. Following his playing days at Tulane, Glover returned to Bay Saint Louis to coach at Saint Stanislaus and also at John Carroll University.
