= Herb Maffett =

American football player (1907–1994)

No. 24, 29, 10
- Position: End

Personal information
- Born: March 5, 1907; Atlanta, Georgia, U.S.
- Died: December 26, 1994 (aged 87); Brandon, Florida, U.S.
- Listed weight: 180 lb (82 kg)

Career information
- High school: Toccoa, Georgia, U.S.
- College: Georgia (1928–1931)

Awards and highlights
- Third-team All-American (1930); All-Southern (1930); Georgia Bulldogs Hall of Heroes; Georgia Sports Hall of Fame

Herbert Sidney Maffett (March 5, 1907 – December 26, 1994) was a college football player.

== University of Georgia ==
Maffett was a prominent end and four-year starter on the Georgia Bulldogs football team. He was elected captain of the 1930 team due to the victory over Yale at the dedication of Sanford Stadium. He was selected All-Southern in 1930, and a first-team All-American by the New York Evening Post. He once described facing an angry coach Harry Mehre and how "you feel like you'd like to go off and hide in a hole." Maffett was inducted into the Georgia Sports Hall of Fame in 1981.
