= 1915 College Football All-Southern Team =

American all-star college football team

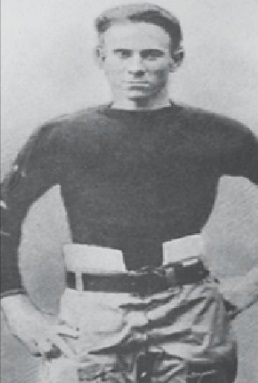
Rabbit Curry.

The 1915 College Football All-Southern Team consists of American football players selected to the College Football All-Southern Teams selected by various organizations in 1915. Josh Cody and Baby Taylor were selected third-team All-Americans by Walter Camp, and Bully Van de Graaff was selected for his second-team. Van de Graaff was Alabama's first ever All-American. Buck Mayer of the 8–1 Virginia Cavaliers was the south's first consensus All-American, selected first-team All-American by Frank G. Menke and Parke H. Davis. The "point-a-minute" Vanderbilt Commodores won the SIAA.

== Composite eleven ==
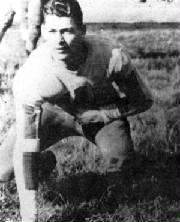
Bully Van de Graaff.

The composite All-Southern team selected by ten sports writers and coaches included:

- Josh Cody, tackle for Vanderbilt, inducted into the College Football Hall of Fame in 1970, only three-time All-American in Vanderbilt football history. Third-team Camp All-American. He was selected for the Associated Press Southeast Area All-Time football team 1869-1919 era. Later a prominent football coach at many institutions.
- Rabbit Curry, quarterback for Vanderbilt, unanimous selection. During the First World War, he was killed in aerial combat over France. He was a beloved player of Coach McGugin, described by one writer as "the player who has most appealed to the imagination, admiration, and affection of the entire university community through the years."
- Russ Cohen, end for Vanderbilt, later an assistant under Wallace Wade at Alabama and head coach at LSU and Cincinnati.
- Wooch Fielder, halfback for Georgia Tech, later an influential veteran of the Second World War.
- John G. Henderson, center for Georgia, the head of a group of three men, one behind the other with his hands upon the shoulders of the one in front, to counter Georgia Tech's jump shift offense utilized by John Heisman. The game ended 0–0. He also played baseball and was later Georgia baseball coach.
- Bob Lang, guard for Georgia Tech, the first guard selected for the Heisman era All-Era Tech football team.
- Walter Neville, fullback for Georgia, made All-Southern in his first year on the varsity.
- David Paddock, quarterback for Georgia, the only player in school history to have a petition circulated by the student body requesting that he play for the Bulldogs.
- Baby Taylor, guard for Auburn, unanimous selection. Weighing just under 200 pounds, Taylor would be a small player today, but he was then considered quite large, "worth three ordinary men." Miss Virginia Gilmer, an Auburn fan of some 13 years of age once told Taylor that “if she were a boy and as big as he and had any sense at all she would be an all-southern tackle.” Third-team Camp All-American
- Charlie Thompson, end for Georgia, captain-elect but ruled ineligible for next year.
- Bully Van de Graaff, tackle for Alabama, unanimous selection. He was selected for the Associated Press Southeast Area All-Time football team 1869-1919 era. Alabama's first All-American, and brother of the inventor of the Van de Graaff generator which produces high voltages. Second-team Camp All-American.

== Composite overview ==
Bully Van de Graaff, Baby Taylor, and Rabbit Curry were unanimous selections.

Name	Position	School	First-team selections
Bully Van de Graaff	Tackle	Alabama	10
Baby Taylor	Guard	Auburn	10
Rabbit Curry	Quarterback	Vanderbilt	10
Josh Cody	Tackle	Vanderbilt	8
David Paddock	Quarterback	Georgia	7
John Henderson	Center	Georgia	6
Charlie Thompson	End	Georgia	4
Russ Cohen	End	Vanderbilt	4
Neil Edmond	End	Sewanee	3
Jim Senter	End	Georgia Tech	3
Bob Lang	Guard	Georgia Tech	3
Bob Taylor Dobbins	Guard	Sewanee	3
Wooch Fielder	Halfback	Georgia Tech	3
Froggie Morrison	Halfback	Georgia Tech	3
Walter Neville	Fullback	Georgia	3
Yank Tandy	Center	North Carolina	2
Everett Strupper	Halfback	Georgia Tech	2
Paul Squibb	Halfback	Chattanooga	2
Roy Homewood	End	North Carolina	1
Phillip Cooper	Tackle	LSU	1
Ted Shultz	Tackle	Washington & Lee	1
Tom Thrash	Tackle	Georgia	1
Pryor Williams	Guard	Vanderbilt	1
C. M. Hamilton	Guard	Vanderbilt	1
George Steed	Guard	Auburn	1
Carey Robinson	Center	Auburn	1
R. McArthur	Center	Mississippi A & M	1
Johnny Barrett	Halfback	Washington & Lee	1
Buck Mayer	Halfback	Virginia	1
Homer Prendergast	Halfback	Auburn	1
Charles C. Schrader	Fullback	Kentucky	1
Hal Hunter	Fullback	Transylvania	1
Pete Mailhes	Fullback	Tulane	1
Bedie Bidez	Fullback	Auburn	1

== All-Southerns of 1915 ==
=== Ends ===
- Charlie Thompson, Georgia (C, DJ)
- Russ Cohen, Vanderbilt (C, NT)
- Neil Edmond, Sewanee (C, TC, NT, SP)
- Jim Senter, Georgia Tech (C, TC, H, SP)
- Roy Homewood, North Carolina (C, H)

=== Tackles ===
- Bully Van de Graaff†, Alabama (C, TC, H [as fb], DJ, NT, SP)
- Josh Cody, Vanderbilt (College Football Hall of Fame) (C, TC, H, DJ [as e], NT, SP [as g])
- Phillip Cooper, LSU (C)
- Ted Shultz, Washington & Lee (C, DJ)
- Tom Thrash, Georgia (C, H)

=== Guards ===
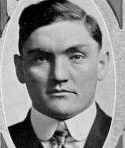
Baby Taylor.

- G. E. "Baby" Taylor†, Auburn (C, TC, H, DJ, NT, SP)
- Bob Lang, Georgia Tech (C)
- Bob Taylor Dobbins, Sewanee (C, TC, NT, SP [as t])
- Pryor Williams, Vanderbilt (C)
- C. M. Hamilton, Vanderbilt (C)
- George Steed, Auburn (C, H)
- Kirby Lee Spurlock, Mississippi A&M (DJ)

=== Centers ===
- John Henderson, Georgia (C, TC, NT, SP)
- Yank Tandy, North Carolina (C, H, DJ)
- Carey Robinson, Auburn (C)
- R. McArthur, Mississippi A & M (C)

=== Quarterbacks ===
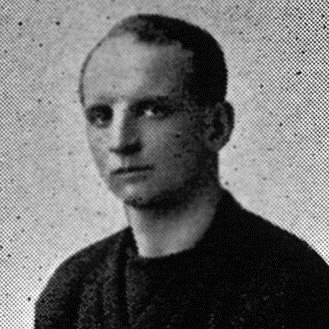
David Paddock.

- Rabbit Curry†, Vanderbilt (C, TC, H [as hb], DJ, NT, SP)
- David Paddock, Georgia (C, TC, NT [as hb], SP [as hb])

=== Halfbacks ===
- Wooch Fielder, Georgia Tech (C, TC, H)
- Froggie Morrison, Georgia Tech (C, H [as qb], NT)
- Everett Strupper, Georgia Tech (College Football Hall of Fame) (C, SP)
- Paul Squibb, Chattanooga (C)
- Johnny Barrett, Washington & Lee (C, DJ)
- Buck Mayer*, Virginia (C, DJ [as fb])
- Homer Prendergast, Auburn (C)
- Clyde Littlefield, Texas (DJ)

=== Fullbacks ===
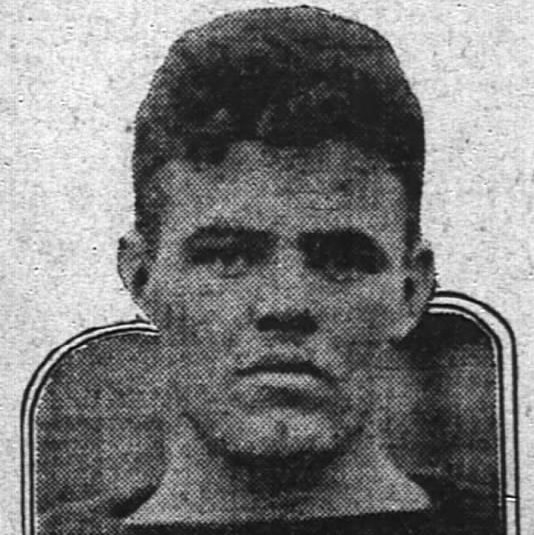
Walter Neville

- Walter Neville, Georgia (C)
- Charles C. Schrader, Kentucky (C, SP)
- Hal Hunter, Transylvania (C, NT)
- Pete Mailhes, Tulane (C)
- Bedie Bidez, Auburn (C)
- Hubert Wiggs, Vanderbilt (TC)

== Key ==
Bold = Composite selection

* = Consensus All-American

† = Unanimous selection

C = received votes for a composite All-Southern eleven selected by ten sports writers and coaches, including those from Memphis, Nashville, Atlanta, Birmingham, Chattanooga, and New Orleans. Votes for multiple positions are combined.

TC = Another composite, using eleven sportswriters, published by the Tennessean.

H = selected by John Heisman, published in Fuzzy Woodruff's A History of Southern Football.

DJ = selected by Dick Jemison in the Atlanta Constitution.

NT = selected by the Nashville Tennessean.

SP = selected by the Sewanee student newspaper, the Sewanee Purple.

== See also ==
- 1915 College Football All-America Team
