= 1930 College Football All-Southern Team =

American all-star college football team

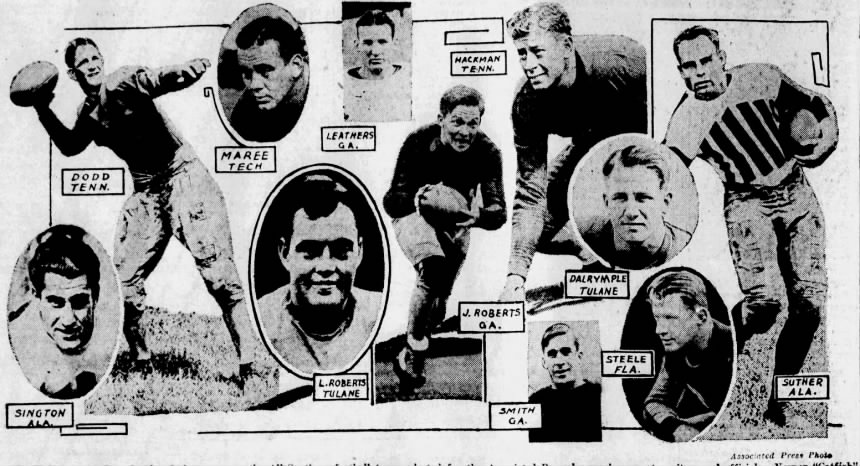
Pictures of the composite eleven.

The 1930 College Football All-Southern Team consists of American football players selected to the College Football All-Southern Teams selected by various organizations for the 1930 Southern Conference football season. Alabama won the Southern and national championship.

== Composite eleven ==
The All-Southern eleven compiled by the Associated Press included:

- Jerry Dalrymple, end for Tulane, elected to the College Football Hall of Fame in 1954.
- Bobby Dodd, quarterback for Tennessee, later coached Georgia Tech to a national title, inducted into the College Football Hall of Fame in 1993.
- Milton Leathers, guard for Georgia
- Vance Maree, tackle for Georgia Tech. One writer said Maree and Frank Speer had the reputation as "the toughest pair of tackles in the south."
- Buddy Hackman, halfback for Tennessee. Hackman filled the role of Gene McEver, who missed the entire season with torn ligaments in his knee. He was inducted into the Tennessee Sports Hall of Fame in 1974.
- Jack Roberts, fullback for Georgia. Known as "The Ripper", he later played in the National Football League.
- Loyd Roberts, center and captain for Tulane.
- Fred Sington, tackle for Alabama. He was inducted into the College Football Hall of Fame in 1955. Sington was chosen for an Associated Press Southeast Area All-Time football team 1920–1969 era.
- Vernon "Catfish" Smith, end for Georgia, made an all-time Georgia Bulldogs football team picked in 1935.
- Jimmy Steele, guard for Florida.
- John Suther, halfback for Alabama. Suther described the feeling before the Tennessee game, which Alabama won 18–6. "Coach Wade was boiling mad. He was like a blood-thirsty drill sergeant anyway, and those critics made him more fiery ... He challenged us to help him shut up the loudmouths that were making his life miserable."

== All-Southerns of 1930 ==
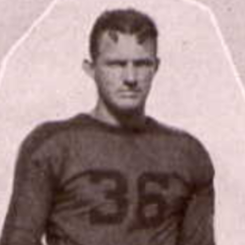
Jimmy Steele

=== Ends ===
- Jerry Dalrymple, Tulane (College Football Hall of Fame) (AP-1, UP-1, DT-1)
- Vernon "Catfish" Smith, Georgia (College Football Hall of Fame) (AP-1, UP-2, DT-2)
- Herb Maffett, Georgia (AP-2, UP-1, DT-1)
- Bill Schwartz, Vanderbilt (AP-2, UP-2, DT-2)

=== Tackles ===
- Fred Sington*, Alabama (College Football Hall of Fame) (AP-1, UP-1, DT-1)
- Vance Maree, Georgia Tech (AP-1, UP-2, DT-2)
- Foots Clement, Alabama (AP-2, UP-1, DT-1)
- Dale Waters, Florida (AP-2, UP-2, DT-2)

=== Guards ===
- Jimmy Steele, Florida (AP-1, UP-1, DT-2)
- Milton Leathers, Georgia (AP-1, UP-1, DT-1)
- Ralph Maddox, Georgia (AP-2)
- Maury Bodenger, Tulane (AP-2, DT-2)
- Harry Thayer, Tennessee (UP-2)
- L. G. "Floppy" Forquer, Kentucky (UP-2, DT-1)

=== Centers ===
- Loyd Roberts, Tulane (AP-1, UP-1, DT-2)
- Ned Lipscomb, North Carolina (AP-2, UP-2, DT-1)

=== Quarterbacks ===
- Bobby Dodd†, Tennessee (College Football Hall of Fame) (AP-1, UP-1, DT-1)
- Austin Downes, Georgia (AP-2, UP-2, DT-2)

=== Halfbacks ===
- John Suther, Alabama (AP-1, UP-1, DT-1)
- Buddy Hackman, Tennessee (AP-1, UP-1, DT-1)
- Shipwreck Kelly, Kentucky (AP-2)
- Don Zimmerman, Tulane (AP-2, UP-2)
- Red Bethea, Florida (UP-2, DT-2)
- Bill Murray, Duke (College Football Hall of Fame) (DT-2)

=== Fullbacks ===
- Jack Roberts, Georgia (AP-1, UP-1, DT-1)
- John Lewis Cain, Alabama (College Football Hall of Fame) (AP-2, UP-2, DT-2)

== Key ==
Bold = Composite selection

* = Consensus All-American

† = Unanimous Selection

AP = compiled from southern coaches and sportswriters by the Associated Press. It had a first and second team.

UP = compiled from 20 of 23 southern coaches by the United Press. It had a first and second team.

DT = selected by The Daily Tar Heel. It had a first and second team.

== See also ==
- 1930 College Football All-America Team
