= 1931 College Football All-Southern Team =

American all-star college football team

The 1931 College Football All-Southern Team consists of American football players selected to the College Football All-Southern Teams selected by various organizations for the 1931 Southern Conference football season. Tulane won the Southern Conference championship. In December 2008, Sports Illustrated undertook to identify the individuals who would have been awarded the Heisman Trophy in college football's early years, before the trophy was established. Tulane's Jerry Dalrymple was selected as the would-be Heisman winner for the 1931 season.

== Composite eleven ==
The All-Southern eleven compiled by the Associated Press included:

- Johnny Cain, fullback for Alabama, All-American and later a coach. He was inducted into the College Football Hall of Fame in 1973.
- Jerry Dalrymple, end for Tulane. One article which attempts to retroactively name Heisman Trophy winners before 1934 named Dalrymple as the recipient for 1931. He was elected to the College Football Hall of Fame as a player in 1954.
- Austin Downes, quarterback and captain for Georgia.
- Pete Gracey, center for Vanderbilt.
- Herman Hickman, guard for Tennessee, All-American. He was inducted into the College Football Hall of Fame in 1959.
- Tex Leyendecker, tackle for Vanderbilt, later played for the inaugural Philadelphia Eagles season.
- Gene McEver, halfback for Tennessee, inducted into the College Football Hall of Fame in 1954.
- John Scafide, guard for Tulane
- Vernon "Catfish" Smith, end for Georgia, made an all-time Georgia Bulldogs football team picked in 1935.
- Ray Saunders, tackle for Tennessee, third-team All-American.
- Don Zimmerman, halfback for Tulane. He threw a touchdown to Vernon Haynes in the Rose Bowl.

== Composite overview ==
Overview of the Associated Press composite. "Votes" were tallied as 2 points for a first-team selection and 1 for a second-team selection.

Name	Position	School	Votes
Jerry Dalrymple	End	Tulane	180
Don Zimmerman	Halfback	Tulane	172
Vernon "Catfish" Smith	End	Georgia	171
Gene McEver	Halfback	Tennessee	168
Austin Downes	Quarterback	Georgia	145
Herman Hickman	Guard	Tennessee	126
Johnny Cain	Fullback	Alabama	122
Tex Leyendecker	Tackle	Vanderbilt	111
Ray Saunders	Tackle	Tennessee	98
Pete Gracey	Center	Vanderbilt	76
John Scafide	Guard	Tulane	69

== All-Southerns of 1931 ==
=== Ends ===
- Jerry Dalrymple*, Tulane (College Football Hall of Fame) (AP-1, CP, TUL, CO, WA-1, SH)
- Vernon "Catfish" Smith*, Georgia (College Football Hall of Fame) (AP-1, CP, CO, WA-1)
- Vernon Haynes, Tulane (AP-2, TUL, WA-3, SH)
- Ben Smith, Alabama (AP-2, WA-2)
- George Koontz, SMU (WA-2)
- Russell Grant, Auburn (WA-3)

=== Tackles ===
- Tex Leyendecker, Vanderbilt (AP-1, CP, TUL, CO, WA-1, SH)
- Ray Saunders, Tennessee (AP-1, CP, WA-2, SH)
- Jay Dee Patton, Sewanee (AP-2, CO, WA-3)
- Ralph Wright, Kentucky (AP-2)
- Calvert "Foots" DeColigny, Tulane (TUL)
- J. D. Bush, Auburn (WA-1)
- Carl Moulden, Texas A&M (WA-2)
- Marion Hammon, SMU (WA-3)

=== Guards ===
- Herman Hickman, Tennessee (College Football Hall of Fame) (AP-1, CP, TUL, CO, WA-1, SH)
- John Scafide, Tulane (AP-1, TUL, CO, WA-2)
- Milton Leathers, Georgia (AP-2, CP)
- Ralph Maddox, Georgia (AP-2, WA-1, SH)
- Johnny Vaught, TCU (WA-2)
- Jess Krajcovic, Maryland (WA-3)

=== Centers ===
- Pete Gracey, Vanderbilt (AP-1, CP, CO, WA-3 [as g])
- Winnie Lodrigues, Tulane (AP-2, WA-3)
- Howard Neblett, Georgia Tech (WA-1)
- Joe Sharp, Alabama (TUL, WA-2)
- Jack Torrance, LSU (SH)

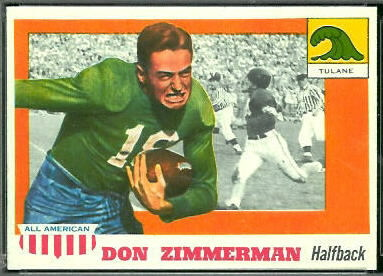
Don Zimmerman.

=== Quarterbacks ===
- Austin Downes, Georgia (AP-1, CP, WA-2)
- Lowell "Red" Dawson, Tulane (AP-2, TUL, CO, WA-1, SH)
- Tommy Henderson, Vanderbilt (WA-3)

=== Halfbacks ===
- Gene McEver, Tennessee (College Football Hall of Fame) (AP-1, CP, TUL, CO, WA-1, SH)
- Don Zimmerman, Tulane (AP-1, CP, TUL, CO, WA-1, SH)
- Shipwreck Kelly, Kentucky (AP-2, WA-2)
- Jimmy Hitchcock, Auburn (College Football Hall of Fame) (AP-2, WA-3)
- Dixie Roberts, Vanderbilt (WA-2)
- Buster Mott, Georgia (WA-3)

=== Fullbacks ===
- John Lewis Cain, Alabama (College Football Hall of Fame) (AP-1, TUL, CO, WA-1, SH)
- Nollie Felts, Tulane (AP-2, CP, WA-2)
- Ernie Koy, Texas (WA-3)

== Key ==
Bold = Composite selection

* = Consensus All-American

AP = selected by coaches and sports writers, compiled by the Associated Press. It had a first and second team.

CP = selected by captains of the football team of the south, compiled by Central Press newspapers.

TUL = the "All Players All-Southern", selected by the players of the Tulane team.

CO = selected by the coaches of the Southern Conference.

WA = selected by William Alexander, coach at Georgia Institute of Technology. It had a first, second, and third team.

SH = selected by Clark Shaughnessy, coach at Tulane University.
