= Ray Saunders (American football) =

American football player

No. 42
- Position: Tackle

Personal information
- Born: c. 1910
- Listed height: 6 ft 0 in (1.83 m)
- Listed weight: 184 lb (83 kg)

Career information
- College: Tennessee (1929–1931)

Awards and highlights
- All-Southern (1931); Third-team All-American (1931)

William R. "Ray" Saunders was a college football player.

== College football ==
Saunders was a tackle for the Tennessee Volunteers of the University of Tennessee. Saunders suffered the first injury of 1930 with a minor knee injury. Saunders was selected All-Southern in 1931 along with teammates and College Football Hall of Fame members Herman Hickman and Gene McEver. He was also selected third-team All-American by the "Captain's Poll", selected by a poll of the captains of the major football teams
