= Auburn–Tulane football rivalry =

American college football rivalry

- Auburn Tigers Tulane Green Wave
- First meeting: November 25, 1902; Tie, 0–0
- Latest meeting: September 7, 2019; Auburn, 24–6
- Next meeting: TBD

Statistics
- Total meetings: 38
- All-time series: Tulane leads, 17–15–6 (.526)
- Largest victory: Tulane, 52–0 (1929)
- Longest win streak: Tulane, 5 (1946–1950)
- Current win streak: Auburn, 2 (2006–present)

Locations of Auburn and Tulane

The Auburn–Tulane football rivalry is an American college football rivalry between the Auburn Tigers and Tulane Green Wave. The rivalry began in 1902. Tulane leads the series 17–15–6.

== Series history ==
The first game took place on October 25, 1902, in New Orleans, Louisiana. Both teams played in the Southern Intercollegiate Athletic Association (SIAA) until leaving in 1922 to form the Southern Conference. Tulane and Auburn were charter members of the Southeastern Conference (SEC) in 1932 and played annually until 1955. The rivalry was renewed in 2006. The rivalry was notable for its back-and-forth nature, featuring three straight scoreless ties from 1936–38.

== Notable games ==
=== 1926: A safety beats Tulane at Sugar Bowl dedication ===
The most notable game of Dave Morey's tenure as Auburn head coach was a 2–0 win over Bernie Bierman's Tulane squad, in the game that dedicated New Orleans' famous Sugar Bowl.

=== 1932: Hitchcock upsets Green Wave ===
Led by All-American Jimmy Hitchcock, Auburn upset the Green Wave 19–7. It was called by one sports editor "the most glamorous football conquest in the annals of Auburn football." Hitchcock scored first when he intercepted a pass from Tulane's All-American, Don Zimmerman, and ran 60 yards for a touchdown, with the key block provided by Dave Ariail. The second touchdown was a 63-yard run from Hitchcock out of a punt formation.

=== 1955: Tulane upsets #8 Auburn ===
In the last matchup until 2006, Gene Newton threw two touchdowns in a 27–13 upset of 8th ranked Auburn.

== Game results ==
Auburn victories	Tulane victories	Tie games

No.	Date	Location	Winning team		Losing team	
1	October 25, 1902	New Orleans, LA	Tie	0	Tie	0
2	October 22, 1910	Gulfport, MS	Auburn	33	Tulane	0
3	October 14, 1921	New Orleans, LA	Auburn	14	Tulane	0
4	November 11, 1922	Montgomery, AL	Auburn	19	Tulane	0
5	November 10, 1923	Montgomery, AL	Tie	6	Tie	6
6	November 8, 1924	Montgomery, AL	Tulane	14	Auburn	6
7	October 31, 1925	Montgomery, AL	Tulane	13	Auburn	0
8	October 23, 1926	New Orleans, LA	Auburn	2	Tulane	0
9	November 5, 1927	New Orleans, LA	Tie	6	Tie	6
10	November 10, 1928	New Orleans, LA	Tulane	13	Auburn	12
11	November 9, 1929	New Orleans, LA	Tulane	52	Auburn	0
12	November 8, 1930	New Orleans, LA	Tulane	21	Auburn	0
13	November 7, 1931	Montgomery, AL	Tulane	27	Auburn	0
14	October 22, 1932	New Orleans, LA	Auburn	19	Tulane	7
15	October 28, 1933	New Orleans, LA	Auburn	13	Tulane	7
16	October 6, 1934	New Orleans, LA	Tulane	13	Auburn	0
17	October 5, 1935	New Orleans, LA	Auburn	10	Tulane	0
18	October 3, 1936	New Orleans, LA	Tie	0	Tie	0
19	October 2, 1937	New Orleans, LA	Tie	0	Tie	0
20	October 1, 1938	New Orleans, LA	Tie	0	Tie	0

No.	Date	Location	Winning team		Losing team	
21	October 7, 1939	New Orleans, LA	Tulane	12	Auburn	0
22	October 5, 1940	New Orleans, LA	Auburn	20	Tulane	14
23	October 4, 1941	New Orleans, LA	Tulane	32	Auburn	0
24	October 3, 1942	New Orleans, LA	Auburn	27	Tulane	13
25	October 21, 1944	New Orleans, LA	Tulane	16	Auburn	13
26	October 20, 1945	New Orleans, LA	Auburn	20	Tulane	14
27	October 19, 1946	New Orleans, LA	Tulane	32	Auburn	0
28	October 25, 1947	New Orleans, LA	Tulane	40	Auburn	0
29	October 23, 1948	New Orleans, LA	#17 Tulane	21	Auburn	6
30	October 22, 1949	New Orleans, LA	#20 Tulane	14	Auburn	6
31	October 28, 1950	New Orleans, LA	Tulane	28	Auburn	0
32	October 27, 1951	New Orleans, LA	Auburn	21	Tulane	0
33	October 25, 1952	Mobile, AL	Tulane	21	Auburn	6
34	October 24, 1953	Mobile, AL	Auburn	34	Tulane	7
35	October 30, 1954	Mobile, AL	Auburn	27	Tulane	0
36	October 29, 1955	New Orleans, LA	Tulane	27	#8 Auburn	13
37	October 21, 2006	Auburn, AL	#4 Auburn	38	Tulane	13
38	September 7, 2019	Auburn, AL	#10 Auburn	24	Tulane	6
Series: Tulane leads 17–15–6

== See also ==
- List of NCAA college football rivalry games
