= List of Tulane Green Wave football All-Americans =

The Tulane Green Wave football team, representing Tulane University in the sport of American football since 1893, has had 19 players named first-team All-Americans. This includes two players who earned the distinction twice, and one player who was a unanimous selection.

== First Team All-Americans ==
Year	Player	Position	Selectors
1925	Peggy Flournoy	B	BE, NB
1929	Bill Banker	B	NYP, AAB, WA, LP
1930	Jerry Dalrymple	E	COL, AAB
1931	Jerry Dalrymple	E	AP, UP, COL, NEA, INS, AAB, CP, INS, WC, HSM, CH, LP
1931	Don Zimmerman	HB	INS, CP
1932	Don Zimmerman	HB	AP, UP, COL, CP, NYW
1934	Monk Simons	HB	
1939	Harley McCollum	LB	AP, NEA
1939	Ralph Wenzel	E	CP, NYS
1940	Tommy O'Boyle	G	
1941	Ernie Blandin	LB	UP, COL, NYS, NEA
1944	W. A. Jones	HB	
1948	Paul Lea	T	INS
1949	Eddie Price	B	INS
1950	Jerome Helluin	T	
1955	Tony Sardisco	G	FWAA
1960	Tommy Mason	B	Time
1973	Charles Hall	T	WC
1987	Marc Zeno	WR	AP
2001	Seth Marler	K	FWAA
2012	Cairo Santos	K	AP, FWAA, SI, CFN
AAB: All-America Board of Football; AP: Associated Press; BE: Billy Evans; CFN: College Football News; CH: College Humor magazine; COL: Collier's Weekly; CP: Central Press Association; FWAA: Football Writers Association of America; HSM: Hart, Schaffner, & Marx; INS: International News Service; LP: Lawrence Perry; NB: Norman Brown; NEA: Newspaper Enterprise Association; NYP: New York Post; NYS: New York Sun; NYW: New York World-Telegram; SI: Sports Illustrated; Time: TIME magazine; UP: United Press; WA: Davis Walsh; WC: Walter Camp Football Foundation
Consensus Pick Unanimous Pick
