= Jay Dee Patton =

American football player, lieutenant colonel, and printer

Sewanee Tigers
- Position: Tackle
- Class: 1932

Personal information
- Born: September 16, 1907; Tennessee
- Died: December 24, 1975 (aged 68); Richmond, Virginia
- Listed weight: 205 lb (93 kg)

Career information
- High school: Hume-Fogg
- College: Sewanee (1931)

Awards and highlights
- All-Southern (1931); All-time Sewanee football team

Jay Dee Patton (September 16, 1907 – December 24, 1975) was an American college football player, World War II veteran, and printer.

== Early years ==
Patton was born on September 16, 1907, to Wade Hampton Patton and Agnes née Self. Patton attended Hume-Fogg High School in Nashville, Tennessee.

== College football ==
Patton was a prominent tackle for the Sewanee Tigers of Sewanee: The University of the South, a member of the school's All-time football team. He was selected All-Southern in 1931. He also later officiated some games.

He was also an All-American in 1931 while at Sewanee.

He went on to play for the Staten Island Stapes, a football team that failed during the Great Depression. He also played for the Richmond Arrows.

== World War II ==
Jay Dee served as a lieutenant colonel in the cavalry of the U.S. Armed Forces during World War II. Neil Edmond, an earlier Sewanee player, was the same rank.

== Richmond ==
After the war he moved to Richmond, Virginia, where he ran a printing business and also ran the Virginia State Penitentiary printing press. He established his own printing consulting firm in 1952.

He married Florence "Billie" Boward and had one son, Jay Dee Patton, Jr.
