= Don Zimmerman (halfback) =

American athlete (1913–1974)

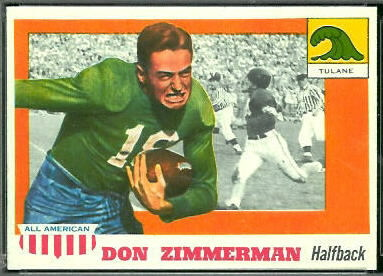
- Zimmerman depicted on a football card in the 1950s

No. 18
- Position: Halfback

Personal information
- Born: January 19, 1913; Texas, U.S.
- Died: May 25, 1974 (aged 61); Shreveport, Louisiana, U.S.
- Listed height: 5 ft 11 in (1.80 m)
- Listed weight: 176 lb (80 kg)

Career information
- College: Tulane (1929–1933)

Awards and highlights
- 3× SoCon champion (1929, 1930, 1931); Consensus All-American (1932); First-team All-American (1931); 2× First-team All-Southern (1931, 1932); Second-team All-Southern (1930); SEC pole-vault champion (1933); Tulane Athletics Hall of Fame; Louisiana Sports Hall of Fame

Donald Gordon Zimmerman Jr. (January 19, 1913 – May 25, 1974), nicknamed "the Flying Dutchman", was an American football player and track and field athlete for the Tulane Green Wave of Tulane University in New Orleans, Louisiana.

== Early life ==
Donald Gordon Zimmerman Jr. was born on January 19, 1913, in Texas to Donald G. and Madeline Zimmerman. Don, Jr. grew up in Lake Charles, Louisiana.

== Tulane University ==
=== Football ===
Zimmerman was a "triple-threat" player as a runner, passer, and kicker on coach Bernie Bierman's and Tex Cox's Tulane football teams from 1929 to 1932. His first three years saw three Southern Conference championships. Zimmerman led the Green Wave to a win–loss–tie record of 25–4–1 (.850). Tulane football legend Jerry Dalrymple started playing the season before.

Zimmerman returning a punt 69 yards for a TD against Mississippi A&M.

==== 1930 ====
The 1930 team lost only to Northwestern, Zimmerman scoring the first touchdown in the 28 to 0 victory over Georgia Tech. He also ran a punt back 69 yards against Mississippi A&M. The 1930 team was Southern co-champion with national champion Alabama.

==== 1931 ====
The 1931 team lost only to national champion USC 21 to 12 in the Rose Bowl in which Zimmerman threw a touchdown to Vernon Haynes. Down 21 to 0 in the third quarter, Zimmerman led a running attack which ended with a 6-yard pass to Haynes for the score. Tulane's other score was a run by Wop Glover set up by 11 and 15 yard passes from Zimmerman to Dalrymple. Tulane still managed a Rose Bowl record for yardage gained. Zimmerman eclipsed 100 yards rushing in both the Auburn and LSU games that year.

==== 1932 ====
The 1932 team saw Zimmerman get then school records with 1,885 yards total offense and a 5.5-yard rushing average. The latter mark still ranks second. Zimmerman was one of three consensus All-Americans from Southern teams in '32, along with Pete Gracey of Vanderbilt and Jimmy Hitchcock of Auburn. Tulane was tied 6 to 6 by Vandy, breaking a Southern Conference winning streak two weeks away from lasting four years. The only score for Tulane came on a 55-yard punt return for a touchdown from Zimmerman. Tulane lost to Auburn, and then lost to LSU in the final game of the year with Zimmerman and several other regulars sidelined by a flu epidemic. "Zimmerman is probably the finest open field runner the South has seen in the past decade" wrote Henry McLemore announcing the United Press All-America team.

He ended his Tulane career as the Green Wave's all-time leader in total offense (4,657 yards on 764 plays, an average of 6.1 yards per play) and pass interceptions, setting records that lasted for 40 years (12). He also ranks fifth in career rushing yards with 2,369. Zimmerman is a member the Tulane Athletics Hall of Fame and was elected to the Louisiana Sports Hall of Fame in 1975.

=== Track and field ===
Zimmerman was Tulane's first Southeastern Conference track champion, winning the 1933 pole vault title. He held the national junior pole vault mark at 13 feet 5 and 7/8 inches, recorded in Lincoln, Nebraska, in the summer of 1931.
