= George Steed =

American football and baseball player

Profile
- Position: Guard

Personal information
- Listed height: 6 ft 2 in (1.88 m)
- Listed weight: 220 lb (100 kg)

Career information
- College: Auburn (1913–1915)

Awards and highlights
- All-Southern (1915)

George Steed was a college football and baseball player for the Auburn Tigers. He was a prominent guard for coach Mike Donahue's football team, selected All-Southern in 1915. In a baseball game, Florida quarterback Rammy Ramsdell broke his leg while stepping on Steed's.
