= Phillip Cooper =

American football player

Profile
- Position: Tackle/Guard

Personal information
- Born: Amite, Louisiana, U.S.

Career information
- College: Louisiana State (1913–1916)

Awards and highlights
- All-Southern (1915, 1916)

Phillip "Chief" Cooper was a college football player.

== College football ==
Cooper was a prominent tackle for the LSU Tigers football team, and captain of the 1916 team. Walter Camp gave him honorable mention in 1916. He was also twice selected All-Southern. He was nominated, though not selected, for an Associated Press All-Time Southeast 1869-1919 era team. Cooper was from Amite, Louisiana.
