= 1932 College Football All-Southern Team =

American all-star college football team

The 1932 College Football All-Southern Team consists of American football players selected to the College Football All-Southern Teams selected by various organizations for the 1932 Southern Conference football season. Tennessee won the Southern championship.

== Composite eleven ==
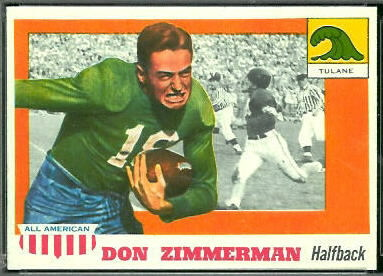
Don Zimmerman.

The All-Southern eleven compiled by the Associated Press included:

- David Ariail, end for Auburn. One source writes "Other than Jimmy Hitchcock, back, and "Gump" Arial, end, Auburn has no outstanding players." He was selected All-American by the "captain's poll," selected by the captains of major college football programs.
- Johnny Cain, fullback for Alabama, All-American and later a coach. He was inducted into the College Football Hall of Fame in 1973.
- Fred Crawford, tackle for Duke. He was inducted into the College Football Hall of Fame in 1973.
- Beattie Feathers, halfback for Tennessee, inducted into the College Football Hall of Fame in 1955.
- Pete Gracey, center for Vanderbilt, consensus first-team All-American.
- Jimmy Hitchcock, halfback for Auburn, consensus first-team All-American. He was inducted into the College Football Hall of Fame in 1954.
- Thomas Hupke, guard for Alabama, later played in the National Football League (NFL).
- Tex Leyendecker, tackle for Vanderbilt, later played in the NFL for the inaugural Philadelphia Eagles season.
- Virgil Rayburn, end for Tennessee, later played in the NFL for the Brooklyn Dodgers.
- John Scafide, guard for Tulane
- Don Zimmerman, halfback for Tulane, consensus first-team All-American. "Zimmerman is probably the finest open field runner the South has seen in the past decade" wrote Henry McLemore announcing the United Press All-America team. On the season, Zimmerman posted then-school records with 1,885 yards total offense and a 5.5-yard rushing average. The latter mark still ranks second. He ended his Tulane career as the Green Wave's all-time leader in total offense (4,657 yards on 764 plays, an average of 6.1 yards per play) and pass interceptions (12), setting records that lasted for 40 years. He also ranks fifth in career rushing yards with 2,369. Zimmerman is a member of the Tulane Athletics Hall of Fame and was elected to the Louisiana Sports Hall of Fame in 1975.

== All-Southerns of 1932 ==
=== Ends ===
- Virgil Rayburn, Tennessee (AP-1, AL, WA)
- Dave "Gump" Ariail, Auburn (AP-1, AS, WA)
- Joe Rupert, Kentucky (AP-2, AL)
- Harry Rossiter, Duke (AP-2)
- Zollie Swor, Ole Miss (AS)

=== Tackles ===
- Tex Leyendecker, Vanderbilt (AP-1, AL, AS)
- Fred Crawford, Duke (College Football Hall of Fame) (AP-1, WA)
- Bill Grinus, VPI (AP-2, AL, WA)
- Malcolm Aitken, Tennessee (AP-2, AS)

=== Guards ===
- Tom Hupke, Alabama (AP-1, AL, AS)
- John Scafide, Tulane (AP-1)
- Marion Talley, Vanderbilt (AP-2, AL, AS)
- Eugene Hite, VPI (AP-2)
- Roy Wilson, LSU (WA)

=== Centers ===
- Pete Gracey*, Vanderbilt (AP-1, AL, AS, WA [as g])
- Howard Neblett, Georgia Tech (AP-2)
- Talmadge Maples, Tennessee (WA)

=== Quarterbacks ===
- Jimmy Hitchcock*, Auburn (College Football Hall of Fame) (AP-1, AL, AS, WA [as hb])
- Lowell Mason, Duke (AP-2)

=== Halfbacks ===
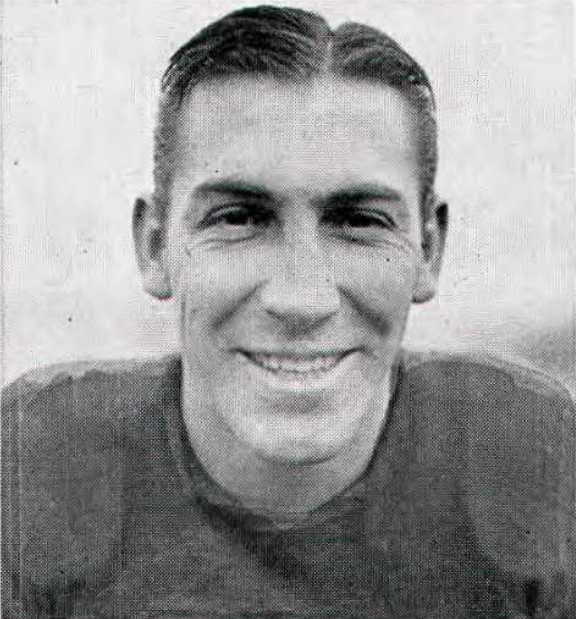
Beattie Feathers

- Don Zimmerman*, Tulane (AP-1, AL, AS, WA)
- Beattie Feathers, Tennessee (College Football Hall of Fame) (AP-1, AL, AS)
- Dixie Roberts, Vanderbilt (AP-2, AL, WA [as qb])
- Buster Mott, Georgia (AP-2)

=== Fullbacks ===
- John Lewis Cain, Alabama (College Football Hall of Fame) (AP-1, AL, AS, WA)
- Ralph Kercheval, Kentucky (AP-2)

== Key ==
Bold = Composite selection

* = Consensus All-American

AP = selected by coaches and sports writers, compiled by the Associated Press. It had a first and second team.

AL = selected by the football coaches at the University of Alabama.

AS = selected by the Anniston Star.

WA = selected by coach William Alexander of the Georgia Institute of Technology.
