= Tom Thrash =

American football player

Profile
- Position: Tackle

Personal information
- Born: Greenville, Georgia, U.S.

Career information
- College: Georgia (1913–1918)

Awards and highlights
- All-Southern (1915, 1916)

Thomas Atkinson Thrash was an American college football player. In 1917, during the First World War, he played on the Camp Gordon team.

== University of Georgia ==
Thrash was a prominent tackle for the Georgia Bulldogs of the University of Georgia, twice selected All-Southern. He scored a touchdown in the 7 to 6 upset victory over Sewanee in 1914. Sewanee had not lost at home since 1893. Thrash was captain of the 1916 team.
