= John Scafide =

American football player (1911–1979)

No. 42, 72
- Positions: Guard, tackle

Personal information
- Born: June 21, 1911; Bay St. Louis, Mississippi, U.S.
- Died: October 24, 1979 (aged 68); Biloxi, Mississippi, U.S.
- Listed height: 6 ft 0 in (1.83 m)
- Listed weight: 220 lb (100 kg)

Career information
- High school: Saint Stanislaus College
- College: Tulane

Career history
- 1930–1932: Tulane
- 1933: Boston Redskins

Awards and highlights
- Championships: 1 SoCon (1931); Honors: 2× First-team All-Southern (1931, 1932); Tulane Athletic Hall of Fame

John Andrew "Baby Grand" Scafide (June 21, 1911 – October 24, 1979) was an American football guard tackle who played professionally in the National Football League (NFL) for the Boston Redskins. He played college football at Tulane University. Scafide served 16 years as mayor of his native Bay St. Louis, Mississippi.

== Early life ==
Scafide was born on June 21, 1911, in Bay St. Louis, Mississippi. He was one of 13 children born to Italian immigrants. He attended high school at Saint Stanislaus College in Bay St. Louis, playing for the "Rock-a-Chaws."

== Football ==
=== College ===
Scafide was an All-Southern guard for the Tulane Green Wave of Tulane University, a member of its team which made an appearance in the 1932 Rose Bowl. He was inducted into the Tulane Athletic Hall of Fame in 1985.

== Mayor ==
Scafide served as mayor of Bay St. Louis from Bay from 1953 to 1969.
