= Jim Senter =

American football player (1892–1968)

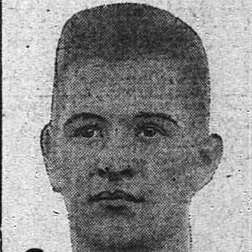
- Senter, c. 1915

Profile
- Position: End

Personal information
- Born: June 10, 1892; Clintwood, Virginia, U.S.
- Died: March 1968; New Orleans, Louisiana, U.S.
- Listed weight: 172 lb (78 kg)

Career information
- College: Georgia Tech (1914–1916)

Awards and highlights
- National champion (1916); SIAA championship (1916); All-Southern (1914, 1915); Tech All-Era Team (John Heisman Era)

James Corbett Senter (June 10, 1892 – March 1968) was an American college football player.

== Georgia Tech ==
=== Football ===
Senter was a prominent end for John Heisman's Georgia Tech Golden Tornado of the Georgia Institute of Technology. he was selected for Tech's All-Era team of the Heisman era. He was selected All-Southern in 1914 and 1915.

Senter was a starter for the 1916 Georgia Tech team which, as one writer wrote, "seemed to personify Heisman". Senter played and scored in the 222–0 defeat of Cumberland University.

=== Baseball ===
Senter also pitched on the Georgia Tech Yellow Jackets baseball team.

== Cornell ==
In 1918, Senter completed his ground school training in the school of aeronautics at Cornell University.
