= Bob Taylor Dobbins =

American football player and coach (1890–1945)

Biographical details
- Born: July 3, 1890; Gallatin, Tennessee, U.S.
- Died: July 27, 1945 (aged 55); Mobile, Alabama, U.S.
- Education: Sewanee:The University of the South

Playing career
- 1913-15: Sewanee
- Position: Guard/Tackle

Coaching career (HC unless noted)
- 1916: Sewanee (assistant)
- 1922–1923: Howard (assistant)

Accomplishments and honors

Awards
- 2× All-Southern (1914, 1915); Second team all-time Sewanee football team

Robert Taylor Dobbins (July 3, 1890 – July 27, 1945) was an American college football player and coach.

== Early years ==
Bob Taylor Dobbins was born on July 3, 1890, in Gallatin, Tennessee to Thomas Miller Dobbins and Leila Glass.

== Playing career ==
=== Sewanee ===
Dobbins attended Sewanee: The University of the South, where he was a guard and tackle on the Sewanee Tigers football team, captain of its 1915 team. He was selected All-Southern and a second-team member of Sewanee's all-time football team.

== Coaching career ==
Dobbins coached high school football in Mobile, Alabama, for many years.

=== Howard ===
Dobbins was an assistant under former Sewanee coach Harris G. Cope at Howard.

== See also ==
- 1914 College Football All-Southern Team
- 1915 College Football All-Southern Team
