= Charles C. Schrader =

American athlete (1893–1967)

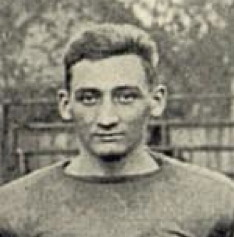
- Schrader c. 1915

Profile
- Positions: Fullback; Forward (basketball)

Personal information
- Born: July 20, 1893; Philadelphia, Pennsylvania, U.S.
- Died: November 16, 1967 (aged 74); Hershey, Pennsylvania, U.S.
- Listed height: 5 ft 11 in (1.80 m)

Career information
- College: Kentucky (1912–1917)

Awards and highlights
- All-Southern (1915)

Charles Christopher "Dutch" Schrader (July 20, 1893 – November 16, 1967) was an American football, basketball, and baseball player for the Kentucky Wildcats of the University of Kentucky. During the First World War he served with the United States Navy.

== Early life ==
Charles C. Schrader was born on July 20, 1893, in Philadelphia, Pennsylvania to Christopf Schrader and Mary Vander Borgt.

== University of Kentucky ==
Schrader was selected as an All-Southern fullback in 1915, a year in which he was captain.

== Music ==
Schrader was a member of the Lancaster Symphony Orchestra for some 20 years.
