= Milton Leathers =

American football player (1908–2000)

No. 42, 35, 13
- Position: Guard

Personal information
- Born: December 16, 1908; Winder, Georgia, U.S.
- Died: March 3, 2000 (aged 91); Athens, Georgia, U.S.
- Listed height: 6 ft 0 in (1.83 m)
- Listed weight: 200 lb (91 kg)

Career information
- High school: Athens
- College: Georgia (1929–1931)

Awards and highlights
- 2× Second-team All-American (1930, 1931); All-Southern (1930, 1931); Georgia Sports Hall of Fame; Bulldog Wall of Fame

Leonidus Milton "Red" Leathers, Jr. (December 16, 1908 – March 3, 2000) was an American college football player.

== Early life ==
L. Milton Leathers was born to Leonidus Milton Leathers, Sr. and Lottie Honea in Winder, Georgia. He was a resident of Athens, Georgia ever since he was 1 year of age. As an athlete at Athens High School he was the only one to letter in all four sports: football, basketball, baseball, and track.

== University of Georgia ==
"Red" Leathers was a prominent guard for the Georgia Bulldogs of the University of Georgia from 1929 to 1931. He made an all-time Georgia Bulldogs football team picked in 1935.

=== 1929 ===
He was a part of the team which beat Yale at Sanford Stadium in the school's first trip south on October 12, 1929. The other guard was also called "Red"–Ralph Maddox. On that game he said "I doubt they [Yale] have ever come to the South to play football. I'd bet as far south as they had gone before was Philadelphia."

=== 1930 and 1931 ===
He was selected All-Southern in 1930 and 1931. In 1931 he was selected a second-team All-American by the International News Service.

== Professional football ==
Leathers played for a short time with the Philadelphia Eagles of the National Football League (NFL) in 1933.
