= Paul Squibb =

American football player

Profile
- Position: Halfback/Fullback

Career information
- College: Chattanooga (1915–1916)

Awards and highlights
- All-Southern (1915); Chattanooga Hall of Fame

Paul Squibb was a college football player.

== Chattanooga ==
Squibb was a prominent running back for the Chattanooga Mocs of the University of Chattanooga, selected All-Southern in 1915. That year, he set a record with 5 touchdowns in the game against Carson-Newman. He was inducted into the Chattanooga Hall of Fame in 1987. Before a game with his alma mater Washington & Jefferson, Chattanooga coach Johnny Spiegel said "I have the greatest fullback playing football today. He is Squibb and for the first time in weeks he will be in perfect condition Saturday. I know we have received several wallopings, but we are good and will demonstrate this to your satisfaction."

== See also ==
- 1915 College Football All-Southern Team
