= Ralph Maddox =

American football player and US Army captain (1908–1944)

No. 44; 42; 11; 8
- Position: Guard

Personal information
- Born: September 28, 1908; Douglas, Georgia
- Died: November 16, 1944 (aged 36); France or Belgium
- Listed weight: 175 lb (79 kg)

Career information
- College: Georgia (1929–1931)

Awards and highlights
- First-time All-American (1930); All-Southern (1930, 1931)

Ralph Carlyle "Red" Maddox (September 28, 1908 – November 16, 1944) was an American college football player and U.S. Army captain.

== College football ==
Maddox was an All-Southern guard for the Georgia Bulldogs of the University of Georgia. The other guard for the team was also nicknamed "Red"–Milton Leathers. Maddox was a member of the 1929 team which defeated Yale at Sanford Stadium. Former Georgia publicist Dan McGill uncovered information that indicated that Maddox had made the International News Service All-America team in 1930. However, this honor had never been recorded in Maddox's lifetime. The 1931 team lost just two games. One to national champion USC and the team which USC beat in the Rose Bowl, Tulane.

== Army ==
Maddox was a U.S. Army captain who died while serving in World War II.
