= Tex Leyendecker =

American football player (1906–1988)

No. 35
- Position: Tackle

Personal information
- Born: February 3, 1906; Frelsburg, Texas, U.S.
- Died: June 24, 1988 (aged 82); Columbus, Texas, U.S.
- Listed height: 6 ft 1 in (1.85 m)
- Listed weight: 235 lb (107 kg)

Career information
- High school: Waco (Waco, Texas)
- College: Vanderbilt (1931–1932)

Career history
- Philadelphia Eagles (1933)

Awards and highlights
- 2× First-team All-Southern (1931, 1932)

Career statistics
- Games played: 2
- Stats at Pro Football Reference

Charles Boede "Tex" Leyendecker, Jr. (February 3, 1906 – June 24, 1988) was an American football tackle in the National Football League (NFL). He was a member of the inaugural Philadelphia Eagles football team in 1933. Leyendecker played for Dan McGugin's Vanderbilt Commodores football teams, twice selected All-Southern. He was later an oilfield worker.
