= David Ariail =

American football player (1910–2001)

No. 17
- Position: End

Personal information
- Born: December 29, 1910; Birmingham, Alabama, U.S.
- Died: February 10, 2001 (aged 90); Fayetteville, North Carolina, U.S.
- Listed height: 6 ft 1 in (1.85 m)
- Listed weight: 182 lb (83 kg)

Career information
- College: Auburn (1932)

Awards and highlights
- SoCon championship (1932); Second-team All-American (1932); All-Southern (1932); First-team All-SEC (1933)

David William "Gump" Ariail (December 29, 1910 – February 10, 2001) was a college football and basketball player.

== Auburn ==
Ariail was an All-Southern end for the Auburn Tigers of Auburn University. He was a teammate of College Football Hall of Fame inductee Jimmy Hitchcock. One source wrote, "Other than Jimmy Hitchcock, back, and "Gump" Arial [sic], end, Auburn has no outstanding players." Ariail would receive passes from halfback Firpo Phipps. He was selected All-American by the "captain's poll," selected by the captains of major college football programs.

Ariail was also captain of the basketball team.
