= Foots Clement =

American football player (1904–1976)

Profile
- Position: Tackle

Personal information
- Born: June 12, 1904; Rover, Arkansas, U.S.
- Died: February 27, 1976 (aged 71)
- Listed height: 6 ft 0 in (1.83 m)
- Listed weight: 230 lb (104 kg)

Career information
- College: Alabama (1928–1930)

Awards and highlights
- National champion (1930); All-Southern (1930); third-team All-American (1930); Alabama Sports Hall of Fame

Charles Baxter "Foots" Clement (June 12, 1904 – February 27, 1976) was an American college football player and prominent Memphis businessman. He was posthumously inducted into the Alabama Sports Hall of Fame in 1989.

== University of Alabama ==
Clement was a prominent tackle for the Alabama Crimson Tide football team of the University of Alabama from 1928 to 1930. He wore a size 14 shoe. He also participated in track and boxing.

=== 1930 ===
He was the captain of the 1930 national championship team. He was selected first-team All-Southern on the selection compiled from 20 of 23 southern coaches by the United Press and third-team All-American in the captain's poll of the Central Press Association.
