= John Suther =

American football player (1907–1984)

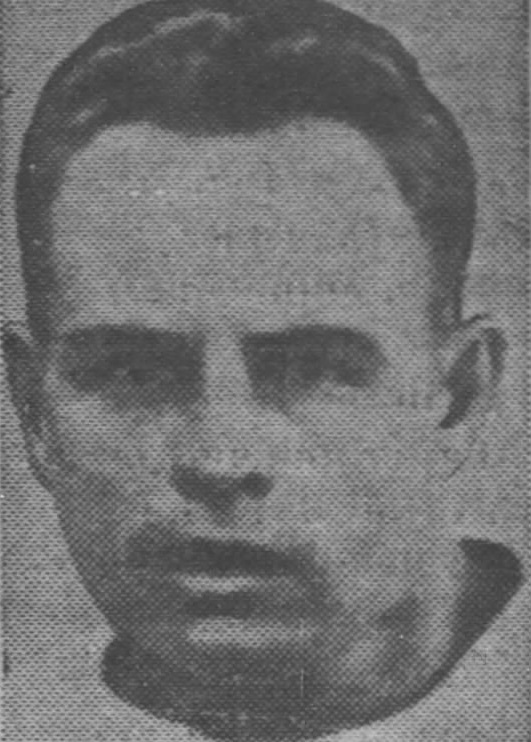
- Suther c. 1930 "Flash"

Profile
- Position: Halfback

Personal information
- Born: December 20, 1907; Tuscaloosa, Alabama, U.S.
- Died: March 15, 1984 (aged 76); Tuscaloosa, Alabama, U.S.

Career information
- High school: Tuscaloosa
- College: Alabama (1928–1930)

Awards and highlights
- National champion (1930); Second-team All-American (1930); All-Southern (1930)

John Henry "Flash" Suther (December 20, 1907 – March 15, 1984) was a college football player.

== Early life ==
He attended Tuscaloosa High School where he was "one of the finest running backs ever in Alabama prep circles" and selected to the All-Southern high school team of the Orlando Sentinel. He joined the Alabama national guard as a senior in high school, serving for 38 years.

== University of Alabama ==
=== Football ===
Suther was a prominent halfback for the Alabama Crimson Tide of the University of Alabama from 1928 to 1930.

==== 1930 ====
Suther was a member of its national champion 1930 team, selected All-Southern and All-American. Coach Wallace Wade was under fire after lackluster seasons in 1928 and 1929, which included narrow losses to Robert Neyland's Tennessee Volunteers. Wade submitted his resignation on April 30, with the caveat that he coach next season. Suther described the feeling before the Tennessee game that year, which Alabama won 18–6. "Coach Wade was boiling mad. He was like a blood-thirsty drill sergeant anyway, and those critics made him more fiery ... He challenged us to help him shut up the loudmouths that were making his life miserable."

== Baseball ==
Suther was the manager of the 1935 Hopkinsville Hoppers.
