= Eugene Mayer =

American football player (1892–1918)

Buck Mayer
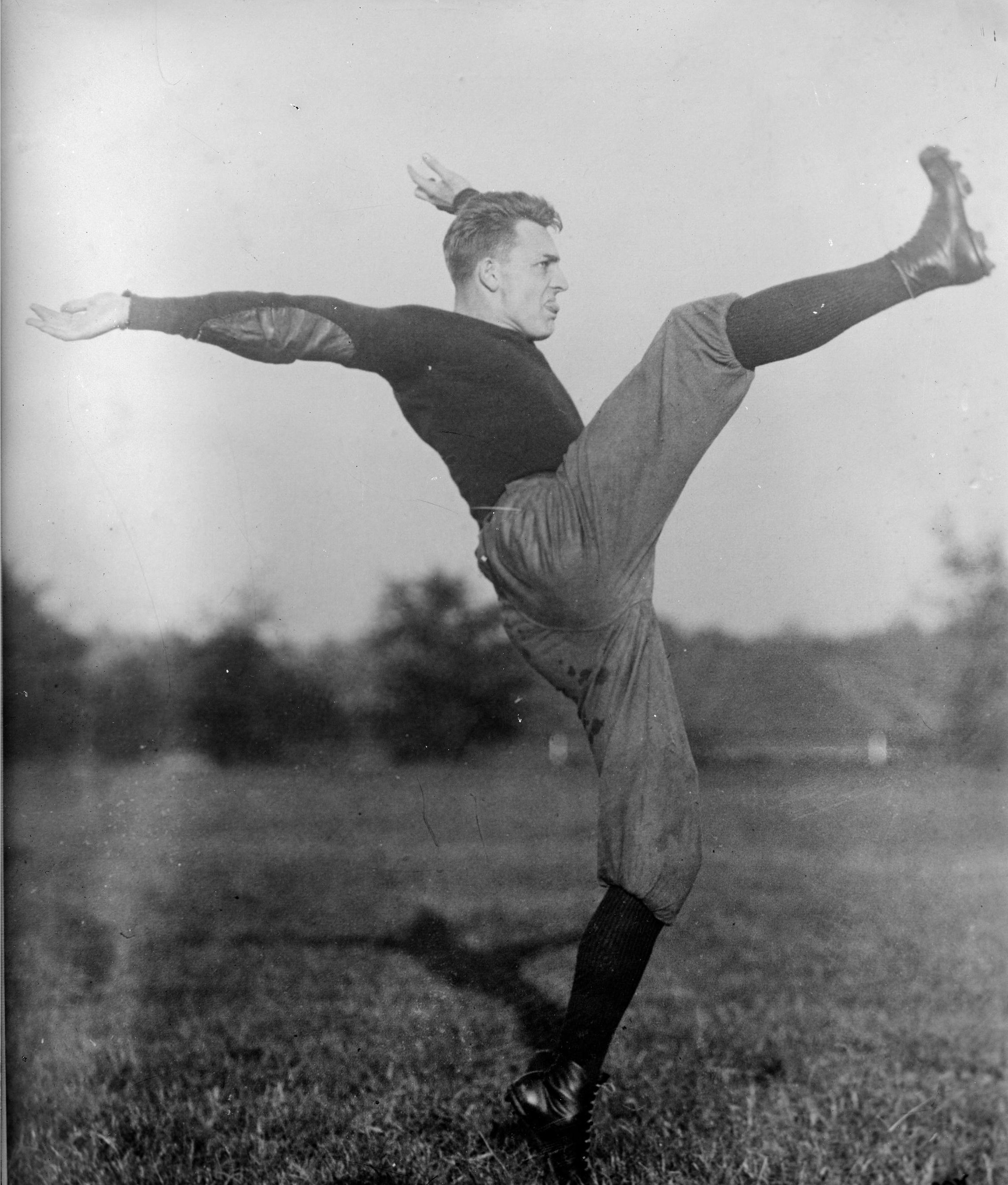
- Mayer c. 1915

Profile
- Position: Halfback

Personal information
- Born: February 14, 1892; Norfolk, Virginia, US
- Died: October 21, 1918 (aged 26); Jacksonville, Florida, US
- Listed weight: 172 lb (78 kg)

Career information
- College: Virginia (1912–1915)

Awards and highlights
- 2× SAIAA champion (1914, 1915); Consensus All-American (1915); 2× All-Southern (1914, 1915); Virginia Sports Hall of Fame

Eugene Noble "Buck" Mayer (February 14, 1892 – October 21, 1918) was an American football player. He played college football at the halfback position for the University of Virginia Cavaliers football team from 1912 to 1915. In 1915, he became the first football player from a Southern school to be recognized as a consensus first-team All-American. Mayer died during World War I while serving in the United States Army. He was posthumously inducted into the Virginia Sports Hall of Fame in 1980.

== Early life ==
Mayer was born in Norfolk, Virginia, in 1892. His father, Eugene L. Mayer, was a Virginia native who worked in the mill supplies business and later as a merchant in the hardware business. Mayer had three brothers and four sisters.

== University of Virginia ==
=== Football ===
Mayer attended the University of Virginia from 1911 to 1916. While there, he played at the halfback position for the Virginia Cavaliers football team from 1912 to 1915. He won a spot in the starting lineup and impressed sports writers in 1912.

After indicating that he may not return to the University of Virginia in 1913, he was persuaded to do so in September 1913. Mayer and Bob McWhorter were deemed "the class of the backfield men of the south" during the 1913 season.

In 1914, Mayer was one of the leading scorers in the country with 121 points scored (19 touchdowns and five extra points) and led the team to an 8–1 record with its only loss coming to Yale. On October 24, 1914, scored 26 points (four touchdowns and two extra points) in Virginia's 28–0 victory over Georgia. At the end of the 1914 season, he was named to the All-Southern team by Dick Jemison and W. A. Lambeth.

In 1915, Mayer led Virginia to an 8–1 record, was one of the country's leading scorers with 105 points, and was selected as a first-team All-American by International News Service sports editor Frank G. Menke and Eastern football expert Parke H. Davis. He was the first player from a Southern school to be a consensus first-team All-American. On October 9, 1915, he scored a school record 37 points five touchdowns and seven extra points in a 74–0 win over Richmond. At the end of the 1915 season, The Washington Herald wrote:

Mayer is one of the greatest half backs the South has produced in years, and is universally recognized as such. He scored more touchdowns last year than any other player in the East and the second in the entire United States. His present season was not as rich in scoring as the preceding [sic] one by some touchdowns, but in it he scored thirteen.

During Mayer's four years as a member, the football team compiled a record of 29–6. He set school records for most points scored in a game (36), most touchdowns in a season (21 in 1914), most career touchdowns (48), and career points scored (312).

=== Track and field ===
Mayer was also a member of the Virginia track and field team. He threw the 16-pound shot put 42 feet, 3 inches, ran the 100-yard dash in 10.1 seconds, and had a career best of 22 feet, 9 inches in the broad jump.

In addition to athletics, Mayer was an excellent student who earned a Rhodes scholarship. He graduated from the University of Virginia in 1916 with a law degree.

== Family and later years ==
Mayer was married at Charleston, West Virginia, in March 1916 to Agnes Elizabeth Chilton (1896–1974). After receiving his bachelor of laws degree that year, Mayer began practicing law in Charleston.

During World War I, Mayer served as either a private in the quartermaster's corps and/or in a machine gun company in the United States Army. In October 1918, he died at age 26 at Camp Joseph E. Johnston in Jacksonville, Florida, a victim of the 1918 flu pandemic. He was survived by his wife and one child.

In 1980, Mayer was posthumously inducted into the Virginia Sports Hall of Fame.
