= Pete Mailhes =

American football player and coach (1894–1965)

- Mailhes in 1939

Biographical details
- Born: March 9, 1894; New Orleans, Louisiana, U.S.
- Died: May 23, 1965 (aged 71); New Orleans, Louisiana, U.S.
- Education: Tulane University

Playing career
- 1912–1915: Tulane
- Position: Tackle/Fullback

Coaching career (HC unless noted)
- 1926–1941: Tulane (assistant)

Accomplishments and honors

Awards
- 2x All-Southern (1914, 1915); Tulane Athletics Hall of Fame

Peter Philip Mailhes (March 9, 1894 – May 23, 1965) was a college football player and coach for the Tulane Green Wave football team of Tulane University. Mailhes was inducted into the Tulane Athletics Hall of Fame in 1998.

== Tulane University ==
=== Playing career ===
==== Football ====
He was a prominent tackle and fullback for the Tulane Green Wave. He was "the greatest Tulane lineman of his day."

===== 1915 =====
He was captain and All-Southern for the 1915 team. One source describes him as "One of the greatest tackles of the South and captain of his eleven. Equally famed in baseball, basketball, track and field athletics.

==== Baseball ====
Mailhes also played baseball.

=== Coaching career ===
He then was a long-standing member of the Tulane coaching staff.
