= Roy Homewood =

American football player and coach

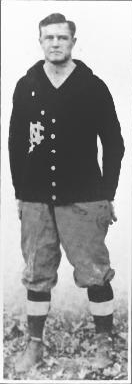
- Homewood c. 1916

Biographical details
- Education: University of North Carolina

Playing career
- 1914-16: North Carolina
- Position: End

Coaching career (HC unless noted)
- 1919: North Carolina (assistant)

Accomplishments and honors

Awards
- 2x All-Southern (1914, 1915)

Roy M. Homewood was a college football player and coach.

== University of North Carolina ==
Homewood was a prominent end for the North Carolina Tar Heels of the University of North Carolina. He was selected for an all-time Carolina football team in 1934. He was selected All-Southern in 1915. He also played on the baseball and track teams. In 1919 he helped coach the ends on the Tar Heel football teams. One Dr. R. B. Lawson picked Homewood as an end on his all-time North Carolina football team.

== World War 1 ==
He achieved a lieutenancy during the First World War.
