= Pryor Williams =

American football player (1893–1948)

Profile
- Position: Guard/Center

Personal information
- Born: December 26, 1893; Athens, Alabama, U.S.
- Died: January 1, 1948 (aged 54); Birmingham, Alabama, U.S.
- Listed height: 6 ft 1 in (1.85 m)
- Listed weight: 226 lb (103 kg)

Career information
- College: Vanderbilt

Career history
- Detroit Tigers (1921)

Awards and highlights
- Championships: SIAA (1915); Honors: All-Southern (1915, 1916)
- Stats at Pro Football Reference

Pryor Allen "Pigiron" Williams (December 26, 1893 - January 1, 1948), was an American football player who played one season in the National Football League (NFL) with the 1921 Detroit Tigers. He was the first Alabama native to play in the NFL. He played college football at Auburn University and Vanderbilt University. While at Vanderbilt, Williams was elected for an All-Southern team in each of 1915 and 1916. Both years his teams had strong records in the South, including a 9–1 record and SIAA championship in 1915, outscoring opponents 514 to 41. That "point-a-minute" team was led by Rabbit Curry at the quarterback position, and on the line were anchored by Josh Cody and Russ Cohen along with the guard Williams. Red Floyd was in the backfield. Williams studied dentistry at Vanderbilt, and after retiring from football, he was a dentist in Birmingham, Alabama. He died from a heart attack at his home in Birmingham in 1948. He was nominated though not selected for an Associated Press All-Time Southeast 1869-1919 era team.
