= Carey Robinson (American football) =

American football player, coach, and athletic director (1896–1962)

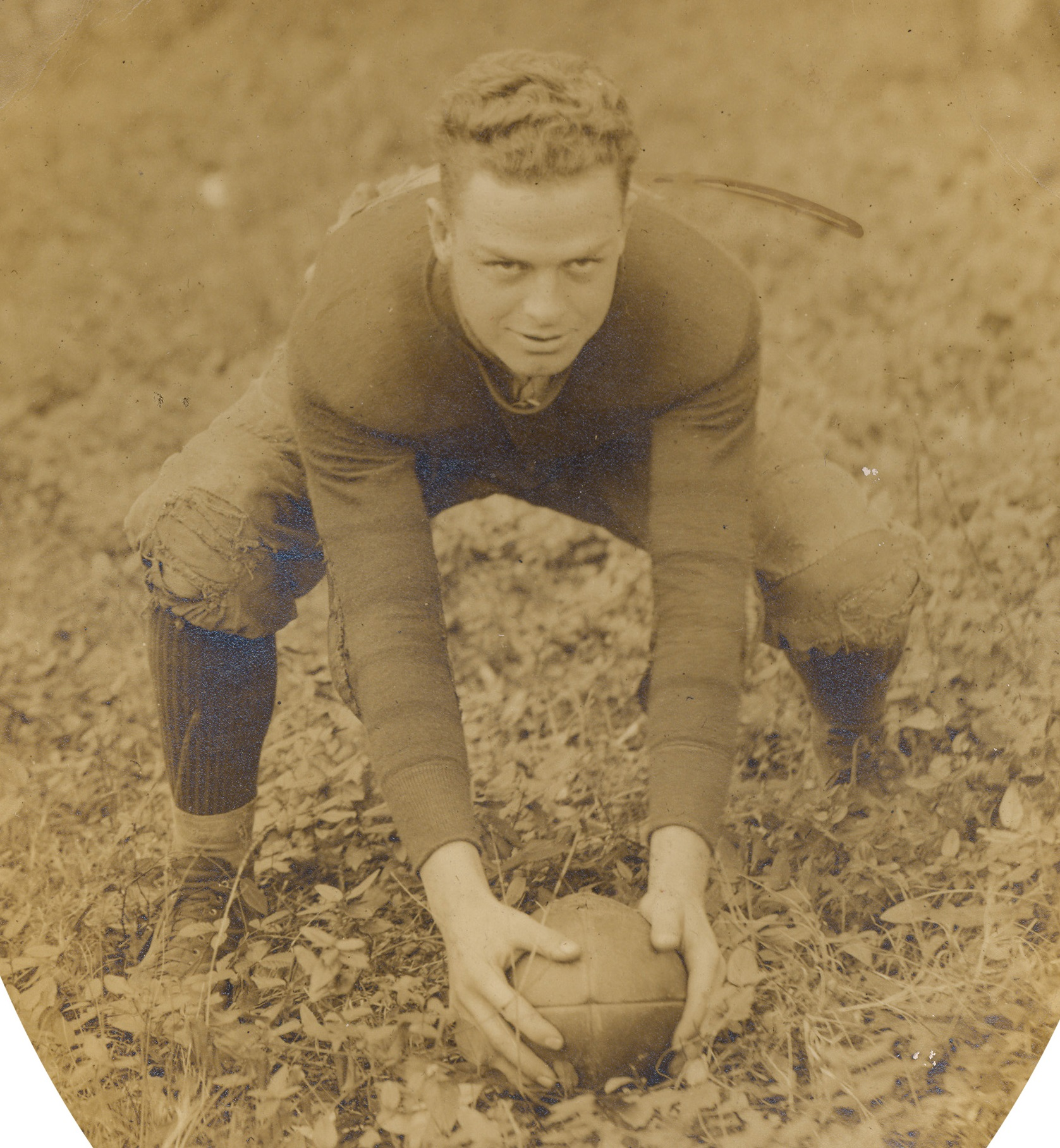

Biographical details
- Born: April 30, 1896; Waverly, Alabama, U.S.
- Died: June 16, 1962 (aged 66)

Playing career
- 1914–1917: Auburn
- Positions: Center, quarterback

Coaching career (HC unless noted)
- c. 1925: Mercer (assistant)
- 1928–1932: Birmingham–Southern (assistant)

Administrative career (AD unless noted)
- 1928–1934: Birmingham–Southern

Accomplishments and honors

Awards
- 3× All-Southern (1915, 1916, 1917)

Carey Carlisle Robinson (April 30, 1896 – June 16, 1962) was an American college football player and coach and athletic director.

== Auburn ==
Robinson was a prominent center for the Auburn Tigers football teams of Auburn University from 1914 to 1917.

Robinson was elected captain in 1917. He played some quarterback as well and was selected for some All-Southern teams.

== Coaching career ==
Robinson was named athletic director of Birmingham–Southern College, serving as assistant on the football team under head coach and former Sewanee athlete Jenks Gillem.
