= Fred Sington =

American football and baseball player (1910–1998)

No. 43
- Position: Tackle

Personal information
- Born: February 24, 1910; Birmingham, Alabama, U.S.
- Died: August 20, 1998 (aged 88); Birmingham, Alabama, U.S.
- Listed height: 6 ft 2 in (1.88 m)
- Listed weight: 215 lb (98 kg)

Career information
- High school: Phillips
- College: Alabama (1929–1930)

Awards and highlights
- National champion (1930); SoCon champion (1930); Unanimous All-American (1930); 2× All-Southern (1929, 1930); AP Southeast All-Time team (1920–1969 era)
- College Football Hall of Fame (Class of 1955)

Other information
- Baseball career
- Outfielder
- Batted: Right Threw: Right

MLB debut
- September 23, 1934, for the Washington Senators

Last MLB appearance
- June 16, 1939, for the Brooklyn Dodgers

MLB statistics
- Batting average: .271
- Home runs: 7
- Runs batted in: 85
- Stats at Baseball Reference

Teams
- Washington Senators (1934–1937); Brooklyn Dodgers (1938–1939)

Frederic William Sington (February 24, 1910 – August 20, 1998) was an American football and baseball player. Sington was also an accomplished saxophonist. Sington was born in Birmingham, Alabama, and was Jewish. He attended Phillips High School.

== College football ==
Sington was a prominent two-time All America tackle for Wallace Wade's Alabama Crimson Tide football teams. While in college he was a member of the Zeta Beta Tau fraternity, Psi chapter at the University of Alabama. He was elected to the College Football Hall of Fame in 1955. Sington was chosen for an Associated Press Southeast Area All-Time football team 1920–1969 era.

=== 1930 ===
In 1930, a year in which Alabama won the national championship and Sington was a unanimous All-American, Rudy Vallée wrote a song about Sington, entitled "Football Freddie", that would go on to become a nationwide hit.

== Baseball ==
In 1932 he led the Middle Atlantic League with a batting average of .368 and a slugging percentage of .720, and in triples with 12 and home runs with 29. In 1936 he was third in the Southern Association with a batting average of .384 and a slugging percentage of .589, as he led the league with 22 triples.

He would also play professional baseball as an outfielder with the Brooklyn Dodgers and Washington Senators, batting .271/.382/.401 with 7 home runs and 85 RBI in 181 games.

== Death and burial ==
He is buried in Birmingham's Elmwood Cemetery.
