= Clyde Roberts =

American football player (1909–2004)

Dixie Roberts

No. 4
- Position: Halfback

Personal information
- Born: July 20, 1909; Cassville, White County, Tennessee
- Died: August 17, 2004 (aged 95); Nashville, Tennessee
- Listed weight: 174 lb (79 kg)

Career information
- High school: McMinnville Central
- College: Vanderbilt (1930–1932)

Awards and highlights
- All-Southern (1932)

William Clyde "Dixie" Roberts (July 20, 1909 – August 17, 2004) was a college football player. He retired as district manager of the Chattanooga office of Life & Casualty Insurance Company.

== Early life ==
Roberts was born on July 20, 1909, to James A. Roberts and Minnie Jones. He grew up in McMinnville, Tennessee. Roberts' father owned the Dixie Hardwood Company.

He broke several prep football records. In his senior year at McMinnville, Roberts led the "Big Blue" to a 10–0 record and a state title. Roberts tallied 520 yards rushing in one game, and 6,730 yards on the season. Colleges flocked to recruit Roberts, but it came down to Tennessee and Vanderbilt. After watching Robert Neyland yell at one of his players in the game against Florida, Roberts picked Vanderbilt. "If he talked to me like that, there would be the damnest fight you ever saw."

== Vanderbilt University ==
He was a prominent running back for Dan McGugin's Vanderbilt Commodores football team of Vanderbilt University from 1930 to 1932. His 1929 freshman team went undefeated.

=== 1932 ===
Roberts was selected All-Southern in 1932. Roberts made a flying leap just as he was pushed out of bounds against Georgia Tech. He knocked out a Tech player sitting on the bench.
