= Charlie Thompson (American football) =

American football player and coach (1894–1949)

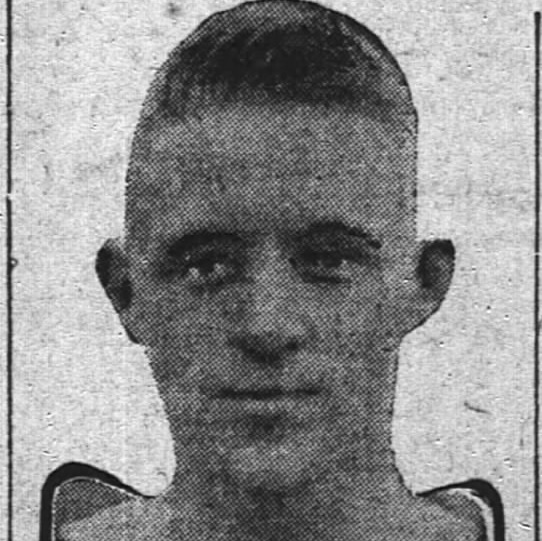
- Thompson c. 1915

Profile
- Position: End

Personal information
- Born: January 7, 1894; Atlanta, Georgia, U.S.
- Died: August 10, 1949 (aged 55)
- Listed weight: 174 lb (79 kg)

Career information
- High school: Boys
- College: Georgia (1912–1915)

Awards and highlights
- All-Southern (1915)

Charles Eugene Thompson Jr. was a college football player and high school football coach.

== Early life ==
Thompson attended Boys High School.

== College football ==
Charlie Thompson was an All-Southern end for the Georgia Bulldogs of the University of Georgia, switching to that position from the backfield. He was elected captain in 1916, but was ruled ineligible. Smack Thompson was his brother.

Thompson starred in an all-star game in Savannah on Christmas Day. One account reads "On an intended forward pass Thompson made a run of thirty-five yards around left end with no interference for a touchdown. He missed goal."

== High school football ==
Thompson coached football for the old Tech High School 'Smithies' in Atlanta.
