= 1930 Kentucky Wildcats football team =

American college football season

1930 Kentucky Wildcats football
- Conference: Southern Conference
- Record: 5–3 (4–3 SoCon)
- Head coach: Harry Gamage (4th season)
- Captain: L. G. Forquer
- Home stadium: McLean Stadium

1930 Southern Conference football standings
	Conf.					Overall
Team	W		L		T	W		L		T
No. 3 Alabama +	8	–	0	–	0	10	–	0	–	0
No. 11 Tulane +	5	–	0	–	0	8	–	1	–	0
No. 10 Tennessee	6	–	1	–	0	9	–	1	–	0
Duke	4	–	1	–	1	8	–	1	–	2
Vanderbilt	5	–	2	–	0	8	–	2	–	0
Maryland	4	–	2	–	0	7	–	5	–	0
Florida	4	–	2	–	1	6	–	3	–	1
North Carolina	4	–	2	–	2	5	–	3	–	2
Clemson	3	–	2	–	0	8	–	2	–	0
Georgia	3	–	2	–	1	7	–	2	–	1
Kentucky	4	–	3	–	0	5	–	3	–	0
South Carolina	4	–	3	–	0	6	–	4	–	0
VPI	2	–	3	–	1	5	–	3	–	1
Mississippi A&M	2	–	3	–	0	2	–	7	–	0
Georgia Tech	2	–	4	–	1	2	–	6	–	1
LSU	2	–	4	–	0	6	–	4	–	0
Virginia	2	–	5	–	0	4	–	6	–	0
Sewanee	1	–	4	–	0	3	–	6	–	1
NC State	1	–	5	–	0	2	–	8	–	0
Ole Miss	1	–	5	–	0	3	–	5	–	1
Auburn	1	–	6	–	0	3	–	7	–	0
Washington and Lee	0	–	4	–	1	3	–	6	–	1
VMI	0	–	5	–	0	3	–	6	–	0
+ – Conference co-champions; Rankings from Dickinson System

The 1930 Kentucky Wildcats football team was an American football team that represented the University of Kentucky in the Southern Conference (SoCon) during the 1930 college football season. In their fourth season under head coach Harry Gamage, the Wildcats compiled an overall record of 5–3 record with a mark of 4–3 against conference opponents, tied for 11th place in the SoCon, and outscored opponents by a total of 207 to 55. The team played its home games at McLean Stadium in Lexington, Kentucky.

== Schedule ==
Date	Opponent	Site	Result	Attendance	Source
October 4	Sewanee	McLean Stadium; Lexington, KY	W 37–0	9,000	
October 11	Maryville (TN)*	McLean Stadium; Lexington, KY	W 57–0		
October 18	Washington and Lee	McLean Stadium; Lexington, KY	W 33–14		
October 25	Virginia	McLean Stadium; Lexington, KY	W 47–0		
November 1	Alabama	McLean Stadium; Lexington, KY	L 0–19	22,000	
November 8	at Duke	Duke Stadium; Durham, NC	L 7–14	15,000	
November 15	VMI	McLean Stadium; Lexington, KY	W 26–0		
November 27	at Tennessee	Shields–Watkins Field; Knoxville, TN (rivalry)	L 0–8	25,000	
*Non-conference game
