= Hal Hunter (fullback) =

American football player

Profile
- Position: Fullback

Personal information
- Born: Allen, Texas

Career information
- College: Transylvania (1915)

Awards and highlights
- All-Southern (1915)

Hal Hunter was a college football player. A native of Allen, Texas, he was a fullback for the Transylvania Pioneers in Kentucky, selected All-Southern in 1915.
