= Walter Neville =

American football player

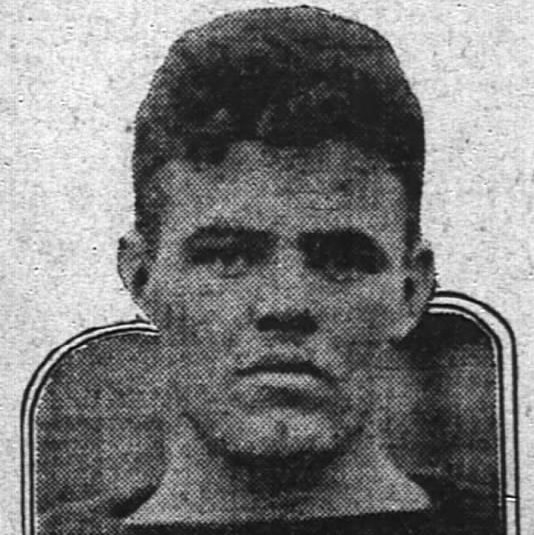
- Neville c. 1915

Profile
- Position: Fullback

Personal information
- Born: September 28, 1894
- Died: September 27, 1984 (aged 89); Dillard, Georgia

Career information
- College: Georgia (1915–1916, 1919)

Awards and highlights
- All-Southern (1915)

Walter Edward "Buck" Neville (September 28, 1894 – September 27, 1984) was a college football player and referee. He served in World War I, and was the farm agent of Towns County, Georgia from 1934 to 1950.

== College football ==
"Buck" was a prominent fullback for the Georgia Bulldogs of the University of Georgia, selected All-Southern in his first year on the varsity. One accounts reads "It was Neville, though, that drew the focus from the 2,000 spectators present. That he is the best fullback in the South and the best Georgia has had since the days of Hatton Lovejoy was easily demonstrated by yesterday's game."
