= Yank Tandy =

American football player (1893–1969)

George Wendell "Yank" Tandy
Profile
- Position: Center

Personal information
- Born: November 27, 1893; Franklin, Illinois
- Died: May 11, 1969 (aged 75); Springfield, Illinois
- Listed height: 6 ft 1 in (1.85 m)
- Listed weight: 210 lb (95 kg)

Career information
- College: North Carolina

Career history
- Rochester Jeffersons (1920); Cleveland Indians (1921)

Awards and highlights
- All-Southern (1915)
- Stats at Pro Football Reference

George Wendell "Yank" Tandy (November 27, 1893 – May 11, 1969) was an American football center in the National Football League. He played college football for the North Carolina Tar Heels of the University of North Carolina, and was selected All-Southern. One Dr. R. B. Lawson picked Tandy as a center on his all-time North Carolina football team.
