= Neil Edmond (American football) =

American football player and lieutenant colonel (1891–1981)

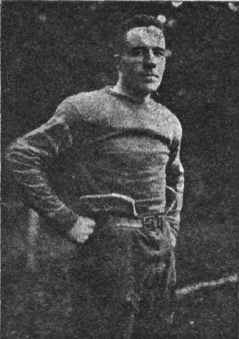
- Edmond playing for Sewanee c. 1915

Profile
- Position: End

Personal information
- Born: November 20, 1891; Waco, Texas, U.S.
- Died: August 19, 1981 (aged 89); Waco, Texas, U.S.

Career information
- College: Sewanee (1914–1916)

Awards and highlights
- All-Southern (1915)

Neil Smith "Chicot" Edmond (November 20, 1891 – August 19, 1981) was a college football player and lieutenant colonel.

== Early life ==
Edmond came from Waco, Texas.

== College football ==
Edmond was a prominent end for Harris G. Cope's Sewanee Tigers football teams, captain of the 1916 team. He was selected All-Southern in 1915. Sewanee's yearbook the Cap and Gown notes "Neil Edmond has played stellar football for Sewanee for the past two seasons." Edmond also was the kicker. His play was often cited as "spectacular" in the 16 to 3 victory over his hometown Baylor. In 1915 the Sewanee writers contended Edmond was "the best in Dixie in going down under punts." Edmond was a member of the Phi Delta Theta fraternity.

== Army ==
Edmond served in the Army as a lieutenant colonel in both World Wars. After retiring from the Army he worked for the Amicable Life Insurance company.

== See also ==
- 1915 College Football All-Southern Team
