= Dick Jemison =

American sportswriter

- Born: Richard Stubbs Jemison; September 19, 1886; Macon, Georgia, U.S.
- Died: January 9, 1965 (aged 78); Xenia, Ohio, U.S.
- Occupation: Sportswriter

Richard Stubbs Jemison (September 19, 1886 – January 9, 1965) was an early 20th-century American sportswriter in the South who was for 11 years the sporting editor of the Atlanta Constitution. He wrote extensively on baseball and football, picking many an All-Southern team. Supposedly, he was the first sports editor to include batting stats in his newspaper column. For two years he was president of the Georgia–Alabama League.

Jemison himself was an avid golfer, basketball player, and bowler.

== Early years ==
Jemison was born on September 19, 1886, in Macon, Georgia, to Robert W. Jemison and Kate Boifeuillet. (Note: Robert's father Henry's family bible is still extant.) His uncle was Edwin Francis Jemison, a Confederate veteran who died at the Battle of Malvern Hill at just 17 years old. Dick's brother J. B. Jemison was later club president of the Thomasville Hornets in 1913.

== Atlanta ==
On watching the flight of Charles K. Hamilton in 1910 he wrote, "The time is not far off when the automobile will be put in the discard for the flying machine, just like the horse was passed up for the automobile."

=== Sports ===
On Georgia's first All-American he wrote, "When you mention football to an Athens fan its definition is Bob McWhorter, and vice-versa;" and McWhorter's "value to the Red and Black team cannot be fully expressed in mere words, or even figures." In 1915, Jemison was first to report that Georgia captain-elect Charlie Thompson was ineligible.

== Ohio ==
Jemison also contributed to Motor World. By 1917 he resigned to enter the automobile business as a salesman and publicity manager for Poole & McCullough Motor Company, which handled the Dort, Winton Six, and Locomobile in Atlanta. He was also once in charge of sales promotion at the Miller Rubber Company. In 1920, he was appointed advertising and sales promotion manager of the Oldfield Tire Co. in Akron, Ohio. He was then national advertising manager for the Ohio State Journal.

== Bibliography ==
- Jemison, Dick (October 1909). "The History of the Southern League". Baseball Magazine. 3.
