= Hugh B. Miller =

American naval officer (1910–1978)

Hugh Barr Miller Jr.
- Born: January 10, 1910; Tuscaloosa, Alabama
- Died: June 21, 1978 (aged 68); Alachua County, Florida
- Burial place: Hazelhurst Cemetery, Hazelhurst, Mississippi
- Military career
- Allegiance: United States of America
- Branch: United States Navy
- Conflicts: World War II; Guadalcanal Campaign
- Awards: Navy Cross (2); Navy Distinguished Service Medal (2); Silver Star; Legion of Merit (2); Bronze Star Medal

Hugh Barr Miller, Jr. (January 10, 1910 – June 21, 1978) was a U.S. Naval officer in the Pacific Theater during World War II, who after being shipwrecked and left for dead behind enemy lines, single-handedly fought the Japanese for weeks until his rescue.

His son, Landon C. G. Miller, wrote an authorized biography under the title Lt. Hugh Barr Miller, Jr.: The US Navy's One Man Army.

There are a large number of other books, comic books, and sections of books that include Miller's heroic saga, including the authoritative 100 Best True Stories of World War II, hardcover. In 2016, a book published by Steven Harding on the incident was set to be adapted to film.

== Biography ==
=== Early years and college football career ===
In college, Miller was the quarterback of the University of Alabama’s Crimson Tide football team, starting two games as quarterback for the 1930 team. The 1930 team played in the 1931 Rose Bowl, and even though Miller didn't play in the game, he was given the nickname "Rose Bowl" on his ship. At the outbreak of World War II, he was commissioned as an officer, and was eventually sent to serve in the Pacific.

=== World War II ===
Miller's ship, the USS Strong (DD-467), was sunk by a Japanese torpedo in the Solomon Islands on the night of July 4–5, 1943, leaving Miller in the water with 22 other men.

Three days later, Miller and three shipmates washed up on Arundel Island. After hiding from the enemy for days, Miller ordered his shipmates to take his boots and knife and leave him behind, as he was severely wounded and thought he would be a liability. He said later, "I thought I was dying, but then I rallied..." The others did leave him behind, attempting to return to U.S.-held territory. They were never heard from again.

Miller recovered from his wounds, though he would suffer from the effects for the rest of his life. He found the body of a Japanese soldier washed ashore, and took his hand grenades and bayonet. Miller used the grenades to kill at least half a dozen enemy soldiers on patrol who had gotten too close to his hideout. He then systematically attacked Japanese machine gun nests using just the hand grenades. Eventually he killed over 20 men using only recovered grenades and the bayonet. Forty-three days after the torpedo attack, Miller signaled to a passing U.S. plane and was rescued later that day by a U.S. Navy J2F Duck float plane.

After his ordeal, Miller was awarded many medals in a ceremony with First Lady Eleanor Roosevelt and Fleet Admiral William "Bull" Halsey. Numerous newspapers, comic books, magazines (including LIFE magazine) and TV shows recounted his story, including the weekly TV Show This Is Your Life, which was hosted by future U.S. President Ronald Reagan, and the TV show Navy Log. Miller was twice recommended for the Medal of Honor, but it was never granted. He was, however, awarded the Navy Cross, two Silver Stars, six Bronze Stars, two Purple Hearts, and 27 other individual and unit decorations.

Numerous books recount Miller's biography. The self-published and only authorized biography, Lt. "Rose Bowl" Miller: The U.S. Navy's One Man Army, was written by his son Landon C. G. Miller. The book Castaway's War was optioned in 2016 by film production company' Gold Circle.

Miller's ordeal has been documented by National Geographic Channel's Ultimate Survival WWII, episode "Desert Island Manhunt", with Hazen Audel.
