= Clarence Gracey =

American football player (1910–2000)

Pete Gracey
- Gracey c. 1932

No. 24
- Position: Center

Personal information
- Born: December 18, 1910; Franklin, Tennessee, U.S.
- Died: December 5, 2000 (aged 89); Nashville, Tennessee, U.S.
- Listed height: 6 ft 0 in (1.83 m)
- Listed weight: 188 lb (85 kg)

Career information
- College: Vanderbilt (1930–1932)

Awards and highlights
- Consensus All-American (1932); 2× First-team All-Southern (1931, 1932)

Clarence "Pete" Gracey (December 18, 1910 – December 5, 2000) was an American football player who was an All-American center for the Vanderbilt Commodores football team of Vanderbilt University.

== Early life ==
Gracey was born in Franklin, Tennessee.

== Vanderbilt University ==
He enrolled at Vanderbilt University in nearby Nashville, Tennessee in 1929, where, after an undefeated season on the freshman team, he played for coach Dan McGugin's Vanderbilt Commodores varsity football team from 1930 to 1932. He was a two-year starter at center for McGugin's Commodores, and the team compiled a three-year win-loss-tie record of 19–7–2 during his college career.

=== 1931 ===
Gracey said "In my first varsity year, the night before we played Georgia Tech, Coach McGugin casually walked up to me in the lobby of our hotel, put his arm around my shoulder and sorta whispered, "I was with some Atlanta newspapermen this afternoon and I told them you were the finest sophomore center I had ever coached. I hope that I haven't made it embarrassing for you" We beat Tech, 49 to 7. Afterward I talked to seven other players and you know, Coach McGugin told them all the same thing he told me."

=== 1932 ===
After leading the Commodores to a 6–1–2 record as a senior in 1932, he was a first-team All-Southern selection and was recognized as a consensus first-team All-American, when he received first-team honors from the New York World-Telegram and United Press (UP), and second-team accolades from the Associated Press (AP), International News Service (INS), Newspaper Enterprise Association (NEA), and the New York Sun. The Commodores and rival Volunteers fought to a scoreless tie. "Considering that we lost such a valuable player as Pete Gracey so early in the game, I thought that Vanderbilt was very fortunate in getting out with a tie" said McGugin.

== See also ==
- Vanderbilt Commodores
- List of Vanderbilt University people

== Bibliography ==
- Traughber, Bill (2011). Vanderbilt Football: Tales of Commodore Gridiron History. The History Press. ISBN 978-1-60949-423-0.
