= Johnny Cain =

American football player and coach (1908–1977)

Biographical details
- Born: November 17, 1908; Montgomery, Alabama, U.S.
- Died: August 18, 1977 (aged 68); Memphis, Tennessee, U.S.

Playing career

Football
- 1930–1932: Alabama
- Positions: Quarterback, fullback

Coaching career (HC unless noted)

Football
- 1933–1934: Alabama (backfield)
- 1935–1936: Sidney Lanier HS (AL)
- 1937–1941: Southwestern Louisiana
- 1946: Southwestern Louisiana
- 1947–1970: Ole Miss (backfield)
- 1971: Ole Miss (freshmen)

Baseball
- 1942–1944: Southwestern Louisiana

Tennis
- 1957–1973: Ole Miss

Administrative career (AD unless noted)
- 1946–1947: Southwestern Louisiana

Head coaching record
- Overall: 33–19–5 (college football); 9–14 (college baseball)

Accomplishments and honors

Championships
- National (1930)

Awards
- First-team All-American (1931); 2× Second-team All-American (1930, 1932); 2× First-team All-Southern (1931, 1932)
- College Football Hall of Fame; Inducted in 1973 (profile)

John Lewis "Hurri" "Sugar" Cain (November 17, 1908 – August 18, 1977) was an American football player, coach of football, baseball, and tennis, and college athletics administrator. He played college football at the University of Alabama, where he was a three-time All-American and a member of the 1930 national championship team that won the Rose Bowl.

Cain served as the head football coach at Southwestern Louisiana Institute, now the University of Louisiana at Lafayette, from 1937 to 1941 and in 1946, compiling a record of 33–19–5. He was also the head baseball coach at Southwestern Louisiana from 1942 to 1944. In 1947, Cain moved to the University of Mississippi to serve as backfield coach for the football team under Johnny Vaught. He was also the head tennis coach at Ole Miss from 1957 to 1973. Cain was elected to the College Football Hall of Fame as a player in 1973.

He stood 5'10" and weighed 183 pounds.

== College career ==
Cain striking a fierce running pose in 1932.

Cain was a member of Phi Sigma Kappa at Alabama.

== Death ==
Cain died of leukemia, on August 18, 1977, at Baptist Hospital in Memphis, Tennessee.

== Head coaching record ==
=== College football ===
Year	Team	Overall	Conference	Standing	Bowl/playoffs
Southwestern Louisiana Bulldogs (Southern Intercollegiate Athletic Association) (1937–1938)
1937	Southwestern Louisiana	4–3–1	2–3–1	T–16th	
1938	Southwestern Louisiana	8–2–1	4–1–1	T–8th	
Southwestern Louisiana Bulldogs (Louisiana Intercollegiate Conference / Southern Intercollegiate Athletic Association) (1939–1941)
1939	Southwestern Louisiana	3–5–1	1–2 / 2–3	/ T–22nd	
1940	Southwestern Louisiana	6–3–1	4–0 / 4–1	1st / T–5th	
1941	Southwestern Louisiana	6–2–1	3–1 / 3–1–1	2nd / T–6th	
Southwestern Louisiana Bulldogs (Louisiana Intercollegiate Conference) (1946)
1946	Southwestern Louisiana	6–4	2–2	3rd	
Southwestern Louisiana:		33–19–5	18–11–3		
Total:		33–19–5			
National championship Conference title Conference division title or championship game berth

== See also ==
- List of college football head coaches with non-consecutive tenure
