= 1930 Alabama Crimson Tide football team =

American college football season

1930 Alabama Crimson Tide football

National champion (QPRS, CFRA, Sagarin) Co-national champion (Davis) Rose Bowl champion SoCon co-champion

Rose Bowl, W 24–0 vs. Washington State
- Conference: Southern Conference
- Record: 10–0 (8–0 SoCon)
- Head coach: Wallace Wade (8th season)
- Offensive scheme: Single-wing
- Captain: Foots Clement
- Home stadium: Denny Stadium; Legion Field; Cramton Bowl

Uniform
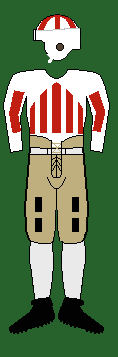

1930 Southern Conference football standings
	Conf.					Overall
Team	W		L		T	W		L		T
No. 3 Alabama +	8	–	0	–	0	10	–	0	–	0
No. 11 Tulane +	5	–	0	–	0	8	–	1	–	0
No. 10 Tennessee	6	–	1	–	0	9	–	1	–	0
Duke	4	–	1	–	1	8	–	1	–	2
Vanderbilt	5	–	2	–	0	8	–	2	–	0
Maryland	4	–	2	–	0	7	–	5	–	0
Florida	4	–	2	–	1	6	–	3	–	1
North Carolina	4	–	2	–	2	5	–	3	–	2
Clemson	3	–	2	–	0	8	–	2	–	0
Georgia	3	–	2	–	1	7	–	2	–	1
Kentucky	4	–	3	–	0	5	–	3	–	0
South Carolina	4	–	3	–	0	6	–	4	–	0
VPI	2	–	3	–	1	5	–	3	–	1
Mississippi A&M	2	–	3	–	0	2	–	7	–	0
Georgia Tech	2	–	4	–	1	2	–	6	–	1
LSU	2	–	4	–	0	6	–	4	–	0
Virginia	2	–	5	–	0	4	–	6	–	0
Sewanee	1	–	4	–	0	3	–	6	–	1
NC State	1	–	5	–	0	2	–	8	–	0
Ole Miss	1	–	5	–	0	3	–	5	–	1
Auburn	1	–	6	–	0	3	–	7	–	0
Washington and Lee	0	–	4	–	1	3	–	6	–	1
VMI	0	–	5	–	0	3	–	6	–	0
+ – Conference co-champions; Rankings from Dickinson System

The 1930 Alabama Crimson Tide football team (variously "Alabama", "UA" or "Bama") represented the University of Alabama in the 1930 college football season. It was the Crimson Tide's 37th overall and 9th season as a member of the Southern Conference (SoCon). The team was led by head coach Wallace Wade, in his eighth year, and played their home games at Denny Stadium in Tuscaloosa, at Legion Field in Birmingham, and at the Cramton Bowl in Montgomery, Alabama. They finished the season with a perfect record (10–0 overall, 8–0 in the SoCon), as Southern Conference champions and as national champions after they defeated Washington State in the Rose Bowl.

In April 1930, coach Wade announced his resignation effective at the end of the 1930 season, and his last Alabama team might have been his best. For psychological effect, Wade routinely started games with his second team, and the backups never allowed a point. The first team defense only allowed the opposition to score 13 points over the course of the season en route to a 9–0 record. Only the Vanderbilt game was close, as the Commodores scored a late touchdown that cut Alabama's lead to five in their 12–7 loss. Vanderbilt's touchdown and a touchdown scored by Tennessee accounted for all of the scoring by Alabama's opponents in 1930.

Alabama received its third Rose Bowl invitation in six seasons, this time against the also undefeated Cougars of Washington State. In the game, Wade started his second team. Once again, the second team did not allow any points and neither did the first team in their 24–0 victory. The win clinched the second perfect season in school history after 1925, and the Crimson Tide claimed the 1930 national championship along with the Notre Dame Fighting Irish.

Johnny Cain starred at fullback, and in the days of iron man football also handled linebacker, and punting duties. (Note: He was named punter for the Alabama Crimson Tide All-Century Team.) He was later inducted into the College Football Hall of Fame. Other players from the 1930 Alabama team included Fred Sington, who went on to play baseball for the Washington Senators and Frank Howard, who later became famous as the long-time head coach at Clemson. Jennings B. Whitworth, who kicked a field goal in the Rose Bowl, was hired as Alabama's football coach a quarter-century later.

== Schedule ==
Date	Opponent	Site	Result	Attendance	Source
September 27	Howard (AL)*	Denny Stadium; Tuscaloosa, AL	W 43–0	6,000	
October 4	Ole Miss	Denny Stadium; Tuscaloosa, AL (rivalry)	W 64–0		
October 11	Sewanee	Legion Field; Birmingham, AL	W 25–0		
October 18	Tennessee^{†}	Denny Stadium; Tuscaloosa, AL (rivalry)	W 18–6	18,000	
October 25	Vanderbilt	Legion Field; Birmingham, AL	W 12–7	20,000	
November 1	at Kentucky	McLean Stadium; Lexington, KY	W 19–0	22,000	
November 8	at Florida	Florida Field; Gainesville, FL (rivalry)	W 20–0	18,000	
November 15	LSU	Cramton Bowl; Montgomery, AL (rivalry)	W 33–0	5,000	
November 27	Georgia	Legion Field; Birmingham, AL (rivalry)	W 13–0	28,000	
January 1, 1931	vs. Washington State*	Rose Bowl Stadium; Pasadena, CA (Rose Bowl)	W 24–0	60,000	
*Non-conference game; ^{†}Homecoming; Source:

== Before the season ==
=== Wade resignation ===
After eight seasons as Alabama's head coach, on April 1, 1930, Wallace Wade announced he would resign his position at the conclusion of the 1930 season to take the same position with Duke. At the time of his announcement, Wade did not give a reason for his departure other than that his contract was set to expire on September 1, 1931. Although never publicly stated by Wade himself, friends and former players attributed his resignation to criticism he received during the 1927, 1928, and 1929 seasons, as well as his desire to return to a private university. Wallace Wade completed his Alabama tenure with a 61–13–3 record (.812), four conference titles, and three national championships. He also coached several star players as well. Wade followed up his success at Alabama with a longer and almost as successful run at Duke, and was later inducted into the College Football Hall of Fame.

== Game summaries ==
=== Howard (AL) ===
Team	1	2	3	4	Total
Howard	0	0	0	0	0
• Alabama	0	34	0	9	43

- Date: September 27
- Location: Denny Stadium
  Tuscaloosa, Alabama
- Game attendance: 6,000
- Referee: Moon Ducote

Alabama opened the season with its only scheduled non-conference game against Howard College (now Samford University) at Denny Stadium. Before an estimated crowd of 6,000 fans, Alabama shutout Howard 43–0. After a scoreless first quarter, the Crimson Tide scored 34 second-quarter points. Touchdowns were scored on runs by Johnny Cain, John Suther (one on a 56-yard run and another on a 96-yard kickoff return), Hillman D. Holley, and John Campbell. The final points of the game came in the fourth on a Hugh Miller run and 33-yard drop kick to make the final score 43–0. Alabama gained 513 total yards on 66 plays and held Howard to only 84 yards on 32 plays.

The starting lineup was: Dobbs (left end), Jackson (left tackle), Sanford (left guard), Sharpe (center), Whitworth (right guard), Godfrey (right tackle), Elmore (right end), Tucker (quarterback), H. B. Miller (left halfback), Long (right halfback), and Boykin (fullback).

=== Ole Miss ===
Team	1	2	3	4	Total
Ole Miss	0	0	0	0	0
• Alabama	6	13	13	32	64

- Date: October 4
- Location: Denny Stadium
  Tuscaloosa, Alabama

The Tide opened conference play game against the Ole Miss Rebels, and for a second consecutive week shutout their opponent. This time the Rebels were defeated 64–0. Alabama's first string entered in the second quarter.

The starting lineup was: Elmore (left end), Whitworth (left tackle), Sanford (left guard), Sharpe (center), Leslie (right guard), Jackson (right tackle), Dothero (right end), H. B. Miller (quarterback), Tucker (left halfback), Long (right halfback), and Hanson (fullback).

=== Sewanee ===
Team	1	2	3	4	Total
Sewanee	0	0	0	0	0
• Alabama	0	6	0	19	25

- Date: October 11
- Location: Legion Field
  Birmingham, Alabama

For the third week in a row, Alabama shutout its opponent the Sewanee Tigers at Legion Field 25–0. The team was led by assistant coach Hank Crisp as both head coach Wade and assistant Jess Neely were in Knoxville to scout the Tennessee Volunteers for their game the following week.

John Campbell gave Alabama its first points with his 58-yard touchdown run in the second quarter. After Campbell scored his second touchdown, John Tucker scored two more to make the final score 25–0.

The starting lineup was: Elmore (left end), Jackson (left tackle), Sanford (left guard), Sharpe (center), Whitworth (right guard), Godfrey (right tackle), Dothero (right end), Tucker (quarterback), Miller (left halfback), Long (right halfback), and Hanson (fullback).

=== Tennessee ===
Third Saturday in October

Team	1	2	3	4	Total
Tennessee	0	0	0	6	6
• Alabama	0	12	6	0	18

- Date: October 18
- Location: Denny Stadium
  Tuscaloosa, Alabama
- Game attendance: 18,000
- Referee: Everett Strupper

On homecoming in Tuscaloosa, Alabama defeated coach Robert Neyland's Tennessee Volunteers 18–6 before what was then the largest crowd to have seen an Alabama game in Tuscaloosa. The loss was Tennessee's first in 34 games, dating back to a 20–3 loss to Vanderbilt during the 1926 season.

The Tide took a 6–0 lead after Johnny Cain scored on a 13-yard touchdown run. John Suther extended their lead to 12–0 later in the quarter with his 33-yard touchdown run. After Hugh Miller scored on a short run in the third, Tennessee responded with its only points of the game on a short Buddy Hackman run in the fourth to make the final score 18–6.

The starting lineup was: Elmore (left end), Whitworth (left tackle), Leslie (left guard), Sharpe (center), Sanford (right guard), Godfree (right tackle), Dothero (right end), Tucker (quarterback), H. B. Miller (left halfback), Long (right halfback), and Boykin (fullback).

=== Vanderbilt ===
Team	1	2	3	4	Total
Vanderbilt	0	0	7	0	7
• Alabama	0	6	6	0	12

- Date: October 25
- Location: Legion Field
  Birmingham, Alabama
- Game attendance: 20,000

Against the favored Vanderbilt Commodores, Wallace Wade defeated his coaching mentor Dan McGugin 12–7 at Legion Field. After a scoreless first quarter, Alabama scored the first touchdown of the game on a short John Campbell run. The Crimson Tide's lead was extended to 12–0 in the third after a 13-yard John Suther run. The Commodores then scored their only points of the game later in the third when Benny Parker threw a 26-yard touchdown pass to William Schwartz. Late in the game, Vandy drove to the Alabama 27-yard line before they stalled out and never threatened again. After a scoreless fourth quarter, Alabama won 12–7.

The starting lineup was: Elmore (left end), Godfree (left tackle), Howard (left guard), Eberdt (center), Miller (right guard), Sington (right tackle), Dothero (right end), Campbell (quarterback), Suther (left halfback), Cain (right halfback), and McWright (fullback).

=== Kentucky ===
Team	1	2	3	4	Total
• Alabama	6	0	0	13	19
Kentucky	0	0	0	0	0

- Date: November 1
- Location: McLean Stadium
  Lexington, Kentucky
- Game attendance: 22,000
- Referee: Moon Ducote

In what was the first road game of the season, Alabama traveled to Lexington and defeated the Wildcats 19–0. Alabama scored its first points on a 49-yard Jimmy Moore touchdown pass to John Suther for a 6–0 lead. Alabama scored 13 fourth quarter points to seal the victory. John Campbell and Leon Long each scored a touchdown on short runs to make the final score 19–0.

The starting lineup was: Moore (left end), Sington (left tackle), Howard (left guard), Eberdt (center), Godfrey (right guard), Clement (right tackle), Smith (right end), Campbell (quarterback), Suther (left halfback), McWright (right halfback), and Cain (fullback).

=== Florida ===
Team	1	2	3	4	Total
• Alabama	0	6	0	14	20
Florida	0	0	0	0	0

- Date: November 8
- Location: Florida Field
  Gainesville, Florida
- Game attendance: 18,000
- Referee: Arthur R. Hutchins

In the first game ever played at Florida Field, Alabama defeated the Gators on their homecoming 20–0. After a scoreless first quarter, Alabama scored their first points on a 21-yard John Campbell touchdown run for a 6–0 lead. Alabama scored 14 fourth quarter points to seal the victory. Campbell and John Tucker each scored a touchdown on short runs to make the final score 20–0.

The starting lineup was: Elmore (left end), Godfree (left tackle), Sanford (left guard), Sharpe (center), Howard (right guard), Clement (right tackle), Dothero (right end), Miller (quarterback), Long (left halfback), McWright (right halfback), and Tucker (fullback).

=== LSU ===
Team	1	2	3	4	Total
LSU	0	0	0	0	0
• Alabama	14	13	6	0	33

- Date: November 15
- Location: Cramton Bowl
  Montgomery, Alabama

In the only game of the season played at the Cramton Bowl, Alabama defeated Louisiana State University 33–0. Alabama's touchdowns were scored on an 80-yard John Campbell kickoff return and on runs by John Tucker, Hillman D. Holley, Leon Long, and Bellini.

The starting lineup was: Moore (left end), Leslie (left tackle), Whitworth (left guard), Sharpe (center), Sanford (right guard), Godfree (right tackle), Smith (right end), Holley (quarterback), Long (left halfback), Tucker (right halfback), and Boykin (fullback).

=== Georgia ===
Team	1	2	3	4	Total
Georgia	0	0	0	0	0
• Alabama	6	0	0	7	13

- Date: November 27
- Location: Legion Field
  Birmingham, Alabama
- Game attendance: 28,000
- Referee: Arthur R. Hutchins

In their final regular season game, the Tide defeated the Georgia Bulldogs 13–0 to capture the Southern Conference championship. John Campbell scored Alabama's first touchdown in the first quarter on a short run and Johnny Cain scored one in the fourth quarter on a one-yard run.

The starting lineup was: Moore (left end), Sington (left tackle), Howard (left guard), Eberdt (center), J. Miller (right guard), Clement (right tackle), Elmore (right end), Cain (quarterback), Suther (left halfback), Campbell (right halfback), and McWright (fullback).

=== Washington State—Rose Bowl ===
Rose Bowl

Team	1	2	3	4	Total
• Alabama	0	21	3	0	24
Washington State	0	0	0	0	0

- Date: January 1, 1931
- Location: Rose Bowl
  Pasadena, California
- Game attendance: 60,000

Immediately after their victory over Georgia in the season finale, University president George Denny accepted an invitation to play in the 1931 Rose Bowl against the Washington State Cougars. The Crimson Tide overwhelmed the Cougars with their 24–0 victory before 60,000 fans at Pasadena.

After a scoreless first, Alabama scored three second-quarter touchdowns in a six-minute blitz to take a 21–0 lead. The first score came on a 61-yard Jimmy Moore touchdown pass to John Henry Suther with the other two coming on touchdown runs of one and 43-yards by John Campbell. Jennings B. Whitworth scored the final points of the game with his 30-yard field goal to give Alabama the 24–0 victory.

The starting lineup was: Dobbs (left end), Clement (left tackle), Sanford (left guard), Sharpe (center), Whitworth (right guard), Godfree (right tackle), Elmore (right end), Tucker (quarterback), Long (left halfback), Holley (right halfback), and Boykin (fullback).

== National championship ==
The NCAA recognizes consensus national champions as the teams that have captured a championship by way of one of the major polls since the 1950 college football season. Prior to 1950, national championships were chosen by a variety of selectors, and in the 1980s, Alabama claimed the 1930 championship as one of its 18 claimed/recognized national championships. As such, Alabama claims a share of the 1930 national championship, with Notre Dame, due to each school being selected national champion by various major selectors. Specifically, Alabama was selected national champion by Football Research, Parke Davis, and Sagarin and Sagarin (ELO-Chess).

== Personnel ==
=== Varsity letter winners ===
==== Line ====
Number	Player	Hometown	Position	Games started	Height	Weight	Age
	C. B. "Foots" Clement	Rover, Arkansas	Tackle		6'0"	230	26
	Edgar Dobbs	Collinsville, Alabama	End				
	Autrey Dotherow	Brooksville, Alabama	End				
	Jess Eberdt	Blytheville, Arkansas	Center				
	Albert Elmore	Reform, Alabama	End				
	John Lewis Hundertmark	Tuscaloosa, Alabama	Tackle				
	Ellis "Red" Houston	Bessemer, Alabama	Center				
	Frank Howard	Barlow Bend, Alabama	Guard				
	Max Jackson	Notasulga, Alabama	Tackle				
	Carney Laslie	Charlotte, North Carolina	Tackle				
	Hugh Miller	Round Mountain, Alabama	Guard				
	John Miller	Hazelhurst, Mississippi	Guard				
	Jimmy Moore	Anniston, Alabama	End				
	Donald Sanford	Parrish, Alabama	Guard				
	Joe F. Sharpe	Mobile, Alabama	Center				
43	Fred Sington	Birmingham, Alabama	Tackle		6'2"	215	20
	Ben Smith	Haleyville, Alabama	End				
	Jennings B. Whitworth	Blytheville, Arkansas	Tackle				

==== Backfield ====
Number	Player	Hometown	Position	Games started	Height	Weight	age
25	Johnny Cain	Montgomery, Alabama	Fullback		5'10"	183	22
	John Campbell	Durant, Mississippi	Quarterback				
	Hillman D. Holley	Tuscaloosa, Alabama	Back				
	Leon Long	Haleyville, Alabama	Halfback				
	Ralph McRight	Mount Hope, Alabama	Halfback				
	John Henry Suther	Tuscaloosa, Alabama	Halfback				
	John Tucker	Russellville, Arkansas	Quarterback				

=== Coaching staff ===
Name	Position	Seasons at Alabama	Alma Mater
Wallace Wade	Head coach	9	Brown (1917)
Paul Burnum	Assistant coach	1	Alabama (1922)
Hank Crisp	Assistant coach	10	VPI (1920)
Orville "Tiny" Hewitt	Assistant coach	1	Army (1927)
Jess Neely	Assistant coach	3	Vanderbilt (1923)
Clyde "Shorty" Propst	Assistant coach	6	Alabama (1924)
Jimmy R. Haygood	Freshman coach	3	Vanderbilt (1906)
