= Herman Hickman =

American football player and coach (1911–1958)

Biographical details
- Born: October 1, 1911; Johnson City, Tennessee, U.S.
- Died: April 25, 1958 (aged 46); Washington, D.C., U.S.

Playing career
- 1929–1931: Tennessee
- 1932–1934: Brooklyn Dodgers
- Position: Guard

Coaching career (HC unless noted)
- c. 1935: Wake Forest (line)
- c. 1940: NC State (line)
- 1943–1947: Army (line)
- 1948–1951: Yale

Head coaching record
- Overall: 16–17–2

Accomplishments and honors

Awards
- All-Pro (1933); First-team All-American (1931)
- College Football Hall of Fame; Inducted in 1959 (profile)

Herman Michael Hickman (October 1, 1911 – April 25, 1958) was an American football player and coach. He played college football at the University of Tennessee and professionally in the National Football League (NFL) for the Brooklyn Dodgers. Hickman served as the head football coach at Yale University from 1948 to 1951, compiling a record of 16–17–2. He later was a television and radio analyst and broadcaster, a writer, and a professional wrestler.

Coach Robert Neyland held Hickman in high regard. "When one (football writer) said Hickman was 'the best guard the South ever produced,' Neyland snarled, 'Herman Hickman is the greatest guard football has ever known.'" Hickman was inducted into the College Football Hall of Fame as a player in 1959.

== Early years ==
Hickman was born on October 1, 1911, in Johnson City, Tennessee. Hickman went to Baylor School in Chattanooga, where he played fullback.

== Playing career ==
=== Tennessee ===
Hickman went to the University of Tennessee, playing for the Tennessee Volunteers football team from 1929 to 1931. He was member of the Tennessee Kappa chapter of Sigma Alpha Epsilon. Hickman played as a tackle during his sophomore season, but was considered small (5'10" 230 lbs) and was shifted to guard by his junior year.

He was named to Grantland Rice's All-America team in 1931, on the heels of his performance in the New York University (NYU) charity game at Yankee Stadium. NYU once was at the 5-yard line and ran four plays at Hickman, turning the ball over on downs at the 23. Hickman was also named to the All-Southern team in 1931, joining Vols teammate Gene McEver.

Describing coach Neyland's penchant for defense, Hickman said "If Neyland could score a touchdown against you he had you beat. If he could score two, he had you in a rout."

=== NFL ===
Following his time at Tennessee, Hickman played for the National Football League's Brooklyn Dodgers from 1932 to 1934. He was named an All-Pro at left guard in 1933.

== Coaching career ==
Hickman was an assistant at Wake Forest University, North Carolina State University and the United States Military Academy before earning the head coaching position at Yale University in 1948. He led the Yale Bulldogs to a 16–17–2 record before resigning in 1951.

== Other activities ==
Hickman had a reputation as a great dinner speaker. He also participated in television broadcasts of football and in radio and television panel shows. From 1952 to 1953 he hosted The Herman Hickman Show, a prime-time sports commentary show airing on the NBC television network. As a writer, he came to be known as "Poet Laureate of the Little Smokies." He was a staff writer for Sports Illustrated. Hickman also was a professional wrestler known as "The Tennessee Terror", competing in over 500 matches.

== Honors ==
Handsome Dan VII, the Yale Bulldog mascot was donated to Hickman at age three, but the dog proved to have a bad temper, which suited him better in his next position as a watchdog on a Florida estate.

The Herman Hickman Scholarship was "(e)stablished by UT alumni and friends in 1958 following the death of Herman Hickman... This graduate scholarship is awarded to varsity athletes in the field of their choice. The recipient currently receives $1,000 per semester."

== Head coaching record ==
Year	Team	Overall	Conference	Standing	Bowl/playoffs
Yale Bulldogs (Independent) (1948–1951)
1948	Yale	4–5			
1949	Yale	4–4			
1950	Yale	6–3			
1951	Yale	2–5–2			
Yale:		16–17–2			
Total:		16–17–2			

== See also ==
- List of gridiron football players who became professional wrestlers
