= Jerry Dalrymple =

American football and basketball player and coach (1906–1962)

Biographical details
- Born: August 6, 1906; Rosston, Arkansas, U.S.
- Died: September 25, 1962 (aged 55); Little Rock, Arkansas, U.S.

Playing career

Football
- 1929–1931: Tulane
- Position: End

Coaching career (HC unless noted)

Football
- 1933–1934: Central Arkansas
- 1935: Eastern New Mexico
- 1937–1938: Brown (ends)

Basketball
- 1934–1935: Central Arkansas

Head coaching record
- Overall: 12–14–1 (football); 25–6–1 (basketball)

Accomplishments and honors

Awards
- Unanimous All-American (1931); First-team All-American (1930); 3× All-Southern (1929, 1930, 1931); Louisiana Sports Hall of Fame (1964)
- College Football Hall of Fame; Inducted in 1954 (profile)

Gerald Richard Dalrymple (August 6, 1906 – September 25, 1962) was an American football and basketball player and coach. Dalrymple worked odd jobs at Ouachita Junior College in Arkadelphia for three years. He was a prominent end for coach Bernie Bierman's Tulane Green Wave football teams of Tulane University from 1929 to 1931. During his three seasons with the team, the Green Wave posted a record of 28 wins and two losses. He wore number 33. Dalrymple was All-Southern in just his sophomore year; All-American by his junior and senior year. In 1931, a year his team went to the Rose Bowl, he was the only unanimous All-American in the country. He is still the only unanimous All-American from Tulane. He was also Tulane's football captain that year. One article which attempts to retroactively name Heisman Trophy winners before 1934 named Dalrymple as the recipient for 1931. He was elected to the College Football Hall of Fame as a player in 1954. He was nominated though not selected for an Associated Press All-Time Southeast 1920-1969 era team. He stood 5'10" and weighed 175 pounds.

Later he went to Louisiana State University where he earned a master's degree in education.

== Coaching career ==
Dalrymple was the second head football coach for Eastern New Mexico University in Portales, New Mexico and he held that position for the 1935 season. His coaching record at Eastern New Mexico was 7–4.

== Head coaching record ==
=== Football ===
Year	Team	Overall	Conference	Standing
Arkansas State Teachers Bears (Arkansas Intercollegiate Conference) (1933–1934)
1933	Arkansas State Teachers	3–5		
1934	Arkansas State Teachers	2–5–1		
Arkansas State Teachers:		5–10–1		
Eastern New Mexico Greyhounds (Independent) (1935)
1935	Eastern New Mexico	7–4		
Eastern New Mexico:		12–14–1		
Total:		26–26–2		
