= Gene McEver =

American football and coach (1908–1985)

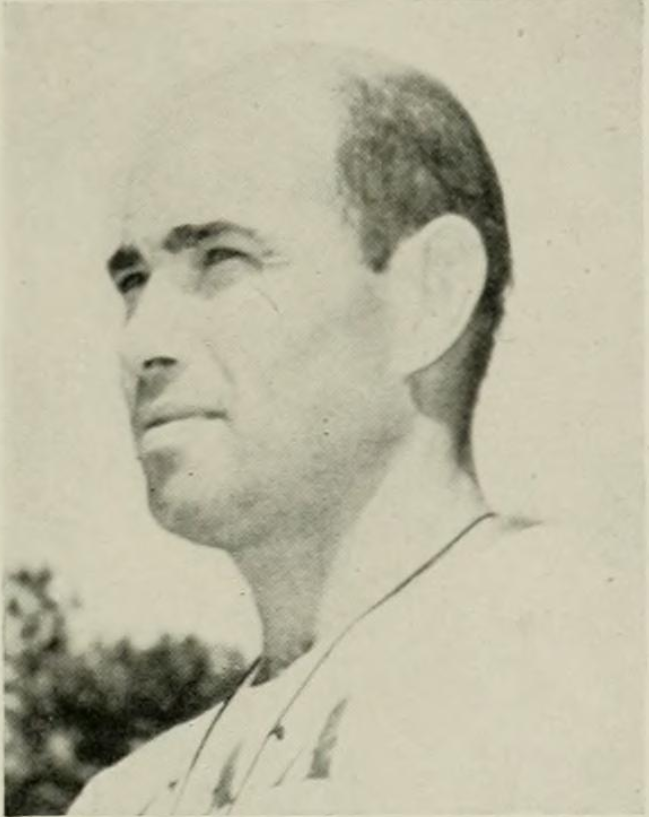
- McEver, 1944

Biographical details
- Born: September 15, 1908; Birmingham, Alabama, U.S.
- Died: July 12, 1985 (aged 76); Davidson, North Carolina, U.S.

Playing career
- 1928–1929: Tennessee
- 1931: Tennessee
- Position: Halfback

Coaching career (HC unless noted)
- 1932–1935: Davidson (assistant)
- 1936–1943: Davidson
- 1944: North Carolina
- 1945–1947: Virginia Tech (backfield)

Head coaching record
- Overall: 22–54–5

Accomplishments and honors

Awards
- Consensus All-American (1929); Second-team All-American (1931)
- College Football Hall of Fame; Inducted in 1954 (profile)

Eugene Tucker McEver (September 15, 1908 – July 12, 1985) was an American football player and coach. He played college football at the University of Tennessee, where he was an All-American halfback. McEver served as the head football coach at Davidson College from 1936 to 1943 and at the University of North Carolina at Chapel Hill in 1944, compiling a career record of 22–54–5. He was elected to the College Football Hall of Fame as a player in 1954.

== Playing career ==
McEver attended Virginia High School in Bristol, Virginia. He was the first-ever All-American for the Tennessee Volunteers football team. He played for the Volunteers in 1928, 1929, and 1931 under Robert Neyland, missing the 1930 season with a knee injury. McEver scored 130 points for the Vols in 1929, helping them to a 9–0–1 record. The total led the NCAA in scoring that season, and his mark stood as the single season scoring record at Tennessee for 95 years until it was broken by Dylan Sampson in 2024. In December 2008, Sports Illustrated undertook to identify the individuals who would have been awarded the Heisman Trophy in college football's early years, before the trophy was established. McEver was selected as the would-be Heisman winner for the 1929 season. McEver also holds the record for career scoring at Tennessee among non-kickers. McEver finished his career at Tennessee with 44 touchdowns and 12 points after touchdown for 276 points. He was named to the All-Southern team in 1928, 1929, and 1931, joining teammates Bobby Dodd and Herman Hickman. He stood 5'10", weighed 185 pounds, and wore number 28.

== Coaching career ==
McEver coached at Davidson College in North Carolina from 1937 through 1943. His record there was 21–47–4. McEver also coached the University of North Carolina to a 1–7–1 record in 1944. He was an assistant coach at Virginia Tech from 1945 to 1947.

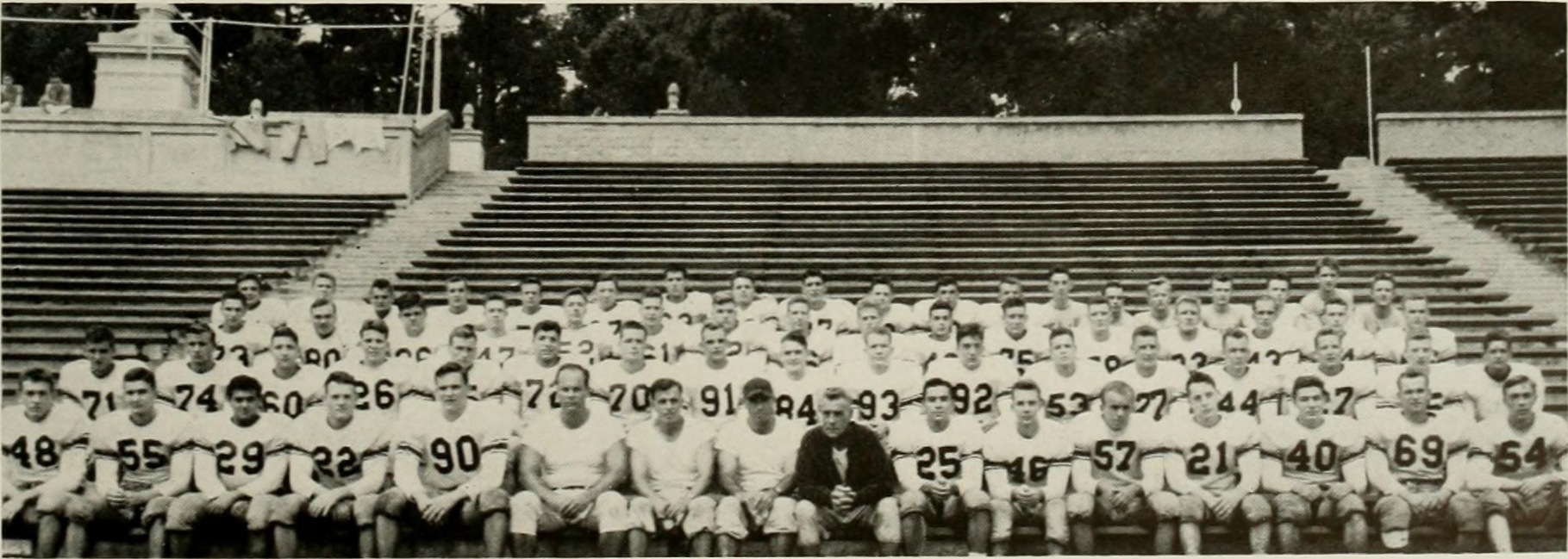
McEver with the 1944 North Carolina Tar Heels football team

== Head coaching record ==
Year	Team	Overall	Conference	Standing	Bowl/playoffs
Davidson Wildcats (Southern Conference) (1936–1943)
1936	Davidson	5–4	4–3	7th	
1937	Davidson	2–8	1–6	16th	
1938	Davidson	4–6	2–6	12th	
1939	Davidson	2–7	1–7	13th	
1940	Davidson	5–5	1–5	14th	
1941	Davidson	1–6–3	1–5–2	13th	
1942	Davidson	2–6–1	2–4–1	T–10th	
1943	Davidson	0–5	0–3	10th	
Davidson:		21–47–4			
North Carolina Tar Heels (Southern Conference) (1944)
1944	North Carolina	1–7–1	0–3–1	9th	
North Carolina:		1–7–1	0–3–1		
Total:		22–54–5			

== See also ==
- List of NCAA major college football yearly scoring leaders
