= Jimmy Hitchcock =

American football and baseball player (1911–1959)

No. 20; 22
- Position: Halfback / Quarterback

Personal information
- Born: June 28, 1911; Inverness, Alabama, U.S.
- Died: June 24, 1959 (aged 47); Montgomery, Alabama, U.S.
- Listed height: 5 ft 11 in (1.80 m)
- Listed weight: 172 lb (78 kg)

Career information
- High school: Union Springs
- College: Auburn (1930–1932)

Awards and highlights
- Consensus All-American (1932); First-team All-Southern (1932)

James Franklin Hitchcock Jr. (June 28, 1911 – June 24, 1959) was an American college football player and Major League Baseball player during the Depression Era. Hitchcock played for the Auburn Tigers football team of Auburn University (then Alabama Polytechnic Institute), where he was the school's first All-American in both football and baseball.

== Early life ==
Jimmy Hitchcock was born on June 28, 1911, in Inverness, Alabama, to James Franklin Hitchcock, clerk of the circuit court in Bullock County, and Sallie Louise Davis.

=== Auburn ===
Known as "The Phantom of Union Springs", where he played in high school, Hitchcock earned three varsity football letters at Auburn from 1930 to 1932. As a triple-threat halfback, he led his team to the 1932 Southern Conference championship. Hitchcock was named a member of the 1932 Walter Camp College Football All-America Team and was inducted into the National Football Foundation's College Football Hall of Fame in 1954. He was a member of an All-time Auburn Tigers football team selected in 1935. He was posthumously inducted into the Helms Athletic Foundation Hall of Fame in 1966 and the Alabama Sports Hall of Fame in 1969. He was nominated though not selected for an Associated Press All-Time Southeast 1920-1969 era team.

==== Baseball ====
Hitchcock was also a letterman in baseball and garnered All-America honors. Following his playing career, Hitchcock returned to Auburn as head baseball coach and assistant football coach (backfield). He also took a position on the Auburn University Board of Trustees which was responsible for the hiring of legendary football coach "Shug" Jordan. Auburn's baseball facility, Hitchcock Field at Plainsman Park, is named in honor of Jimmy and his younger brother, Billy Hitchcock, who played and managed in the majors.

== Major League Baseball ==
He played professional baseball for nine seasons (1933–40; 1946), including a stint as the shortstop for the Boston Bees (now known as the Atlanta Braves) of the National League in 1938. Hitchcock saw action in only 28 games. He collected 13 hits (all singles) and three bases on balls in 79 plate appearances, hitting .171 with seven runs batted in.

== After college ==
Outside of sports, Hitchcock served in the United States Navy in World War II. He later parlayed his popularity in Alabama into a political position on the Alabama Public Service Commission, for which he served until his death in 1959.
