= College Football All-Southern Team =

- Awarded for: The best American college football players at their respective positions on teams from the South
- Country: United States
- First award: c. 1895

The College Football All-Southern Team was an all-star team of college football players from the Southern United States. The honor was given annually to the best players at their respective positions. It is analogous to the All-America Team and was most often selected in newspapers. Notable pickers of All-Southern teams include John Heisman, Dan McGugin, George C. Marshall, Grantland Rice, W. A. Lambeth, Reynolds Tichenor, Nash Buckingham, Innis Brown, and Dick Jemison.

== Football in the south ==
Princeton's 115-0 drubbing of Virginia in 1890 marked football's arrival in the south by playing a northern school. Virginia was considered the Southern champion.

=== Conference play ===
Major football programs in the South used to include: members of the Southern Intercollegiate Athletic Association (SIAA), the conference representative of the Deep South and used more strictly to mean the South east of Vanderbilt University in Nashville, the predecessor to today's Southeastern Conference (SEC, which originally represented the Southern states west and south of the Appalachians); the South Atlantic Intercollegiate Athletic Association (SAIAA), representative of the South Atlantic States and especially Virginia and North Carolina, the predecessor to today's Atlantic Coast Conference (ACC); and the Southwest Conference, representative of the Southwest United States, a predecessor to southern portions of today's Big 12 Conference. These categories apply only broadly. For example, North Carolina was in both the SIAA and SAIAA at different points in its history. Clemson, today in the ACC, was in the SIAA; and Washington & Lee, today in neither, was a member of the SAIAA.

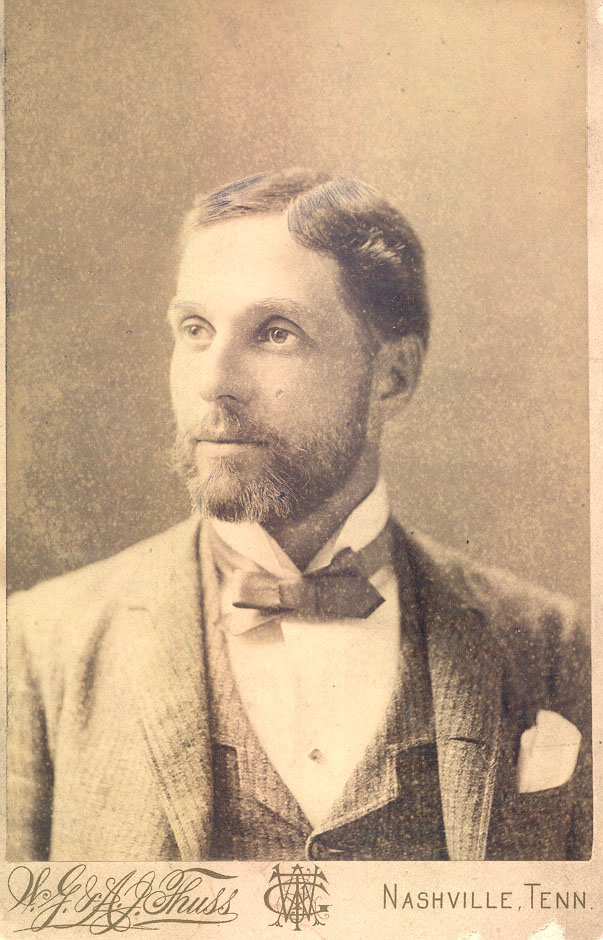
Dr. Dudley founded the SIAA.

==== SIAA ====
The SIAA was the oldest of these, founded in the winter of 1894 by Vanderbilt chemistry professor William Lofland Dudley. The SIAA was often seen as large enough to represent the South at large; and with officials and coaches and so forth of potential selectors restricted to viewing conference play, an All-SIAA team was sometimes equivalent to the All-Southern team; apparently with increasing frequency since 1902. For example, the 1905 composite selection from the Atlanta Journal reads "It must be taken into consideration, however, that each gridiron Sir Oracle was requested by the Journal to confine his selections to members of clubs composing the S. I. A. A. This organization really represents the greater south, as its scope is wider and more general. V. P. I. can scarcely be figured in the calculation as that institution hasn't played any of the S. I. A. A. representatives." South Atlantic writers of course were not fond of this, and would sometimes critique the latest All-Southern selection with titles such as "Virginia and Carolina no longer in the South."

==== Southern Conference ====
In 1922 teams from the SIAA and SAIAA left for the Southern Conference and All-Southern teams become effectively All-Southern Conference teams. By 1933 the contemporary Southeastern Conference was established. The major programs then in the SEC, "All-Southern" teams become associated with the by comparison minor conferences of the Southern Conference or SIAA especially after the formation of the Atlantic Coast Conference in 1953.

== Eastern bias in All-American selections ==
=== Walter Camp ===
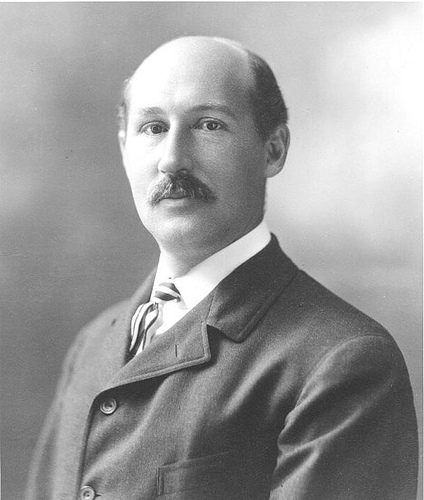
Walter Camp's "Eastern bias" drove the need for an All-Southern team.

Walter Camp's annual "official" All-America first team had been historically loaded with college players from Harvard, Yale, Princeton, Penn, and other Northeastern colleges. The dominance of Ivy League players on Camp's All-America teams led to criticism over the years that his selections were biased against players from the leading Western universities (then in America the West meant the Great Lakes region), including Chicago, Michigan, Minnesota, Wisconsin, and Notre Dame. Many selectors picked only Eastern players. For example, Wilton S. Farnsworth's All-American eleven of 1910 for the New York Evening Journal was made up of five players from Harvard, two from West Point, and one each from Yale, Princeton, Penn, and Brown. In 1894, Michigan defeated Cornell and lobbied for its center Fatty Smith to be the first Western All-American. The resistance to selecting Smith (or any other Western player) as an All-American is reflected in the following newspaper account from December 1894:

"Some of the western colleges have developed great players on their teams and this year may claim for them a position on the All American team. Notably the University of Michigan claims for their center 'Fatty' Smith the supremacy in his position. But the western institutions have not yet mastered the eastern knowledge of all the details and fine points of the game. Smith has made a great record against the west and even against Cornell, but the Ithacan center was not a master of his position. When brought to face a man like the Stillman of today or the Bulliet of last year, Smith would simply be lost and entirely out generaled. So it would be with all of the claimants for line positions from western teams. And no one claims for a moment that western back field men could play in the same class with eastern men."

=== Other selectors ===
The selectors were typically Eastern writers and former players who attended only games in the East. In December 1910, The Mansfield News, an Ohio newspaper, ran an article headlined: "All-American Teams of East Are Jokes: Critics Who Never Saw Western Teams Play to Name Best in Country -- Forget About Michigan, Minnesota and Illinois." The article noted: "Eastern sporting editors must be devoid of all sense of humor, judging by the way in which they permit their football writers to pick 'All-American' elevens. What man in the lot that have picked 'All-American' elevens this fall, saw a single game outside the North Atlantic States? With a conceit all their own they fail to recognize that the United States reaches more than 200 miles in any direction from New York. ... Suppose an Ohio football writer picked 'All-American' teams. Ohio readers would not stand for it. But apparently the eastern readers will swallow anything."

=== Southern All-Americans ===
The perception of bias was even worse in the South than in the West, and Camp's team eventually grew to accommodate Western football in a way it never did with the South. To illustrate an example of this, Chicago punter Clarence Herschberger in 1898 and Michigan back Willie Heston in 1903 made Camp's first team. By 1905, Camp said V. P. I.'s Hunter Carpenter was probably the best football player in the United States, but he hadn’t personally seen him and refused to name him to the All-American team because he wouldn’t pick any player that he hadn’t seen. In 1906, Owsley Manier made Camp's third-team All-American. Buck Mayer, in 1915, was the South's first consensus All-American. In 1917, the same year as the South's first national champion team, John Heisman's Georgia Tech, Tech players Walker Carpenter and Everett Strupper were the first two from the Deep South selected first-team All-American. The next year Bum Day was the first player on a Southern team selected for Camp's first team. Only six southern players ever made Camp's first team before his death in 1925, Day along with: Bo McMillin of Centre, Red Weaver of Centre; Bill Fincher of Georgia Tech; Red Roberts of Centre; and Lynn Bomar of Vanderbilt. Therefore for many years the All-Southern team was how the south recognized its best. Fuzzy Woodruff commenting on the 1921 composite selection of the Atlanta Constitution and Atlanta Journal states "This composite pick has now been recognized as the south's official football hall of fame. No southern player can receive a higher honor unless he happens to be named on Walter Camp's All-American." By 1933 as above the modern Southeastern Conference was established, and All-SEC teams took prominence in the south; but also the south's recognition on All-America teams had increased, for the 1932 College Football All-America Team featured three southern consensus All-Americans: Pete Gracey of Vanderbilt, Jimmy Hitchcock of Auburn, and Don Zimmerman of Tulane.

== College Football Hall of Fame ==
Inductees into the College Football Hall of Fame named to one or more All-Southern team include:

- Henry Seibels, Sewanee
- Hunter Carpenter, Virginia Tech
- Henry D. Phillips, Sewanee
- John J. Tigert, Vanderbilt
- Nathan Dougherty, Tennessee
- Doc Fenton, LSU
- Ray Morrison, Vanderbilt, as coach
- Bob McWhorter, Georgia
- Everett Strupper, Georgia Tech
- Bill Fincher, Georgia Tech
- Joe Guyon, Georgia Tech
- Josh Cody, Vanderbilt
- Buck Flowers, Georgia Tech
- Bo McMillin, Centre
- Edwin Hale, Mississippi College
- Lynn Bomar, Vanderbilt
- Pooley Hubert, Alabama
- Lester Lautenschlaeger, Tulane
- Johnny Mack Brown, Alabama
- Bill Spears, Vanderbilt
- Jack McDowall, NC State
- Rags Matthews, TCU
- Allyn McKeen, Tennessee, as coach
- Dale Van Sickel, Florida
- Peter Pund, Georgia Tech
- Bill Banker, Tulane
- Vernon "Catfish" Smith, Georgia
- Barton Koch, Baylor
- Bobby Dodd, Tennessee
- Gene McEver, Tennessee
- Fred Sington, Alabama
- Jerry Dalrymple, Tulane
- Herman Hickman, Tennessee
- Jimmy Hitchcock, Auburn
- Johnny Cain, Alabama
- Beattie Feathers, Tennessee

== All-time teams ==
=== Associated Press ===
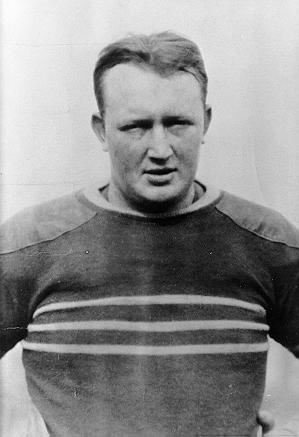
Red Roberts of Centre, made the Southeast All-time Team (1869–1919) era at the end position.

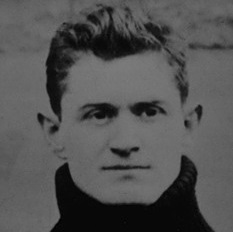
Ray Morrison of Vanderbilt, was chosen for both quarterback and return specialist for the Southeast All-time Team (1869–1919) era.

The Associated Press and FWAA in 1969 put out a Southeast Area All-Time football team for the first 50 years of football (1869–1919) and the second 50 (1920–1969). On the selection committee were Zipp Newman, Jack Hairston, Jesse Outlar, Cawood Ledford, Bud Montet, Carl Walters, and Raymond Johnson.

==== 1869–1919 era ====
The 1869–1919 team included:

===== Ends =====
- Red Roberts, Centre
- Bob Blake, Vanderbilt

===== Tackles =====
- Josh Cody, Vanderbilt
- Bully Van de Graaff, Alabama

===== Guards =====
- Nathan Dougherty, Tennessee
- Will Metzger, Vanderbilt

===== Center =====
- Stein Stone, Vanderbilt

===== Quarterback =====
- Ray Morrison, Vanderbilt

===== Halfbacks =====
- Buck Flowers, Georgia Tech
- Bob McWhorter, Georgia

===== Fullbacks =====
- Joe Guyon, Georgia Tech

===== Punter =====
- Jenks Gillem, Sewanee

===== Placekicker =====
- Red Weaver, Centre

===== Return specialist =====
- Ray Morrison, Vanderbilt

Roberts, Dougherty, and Guyon were unanimous selections for the team.

==== 1920–1969 era ====
Of the second era (1920–1969), notable stars from the All-Southern era (i.e., until 1932) included:

===== Ends =====
- Lynn Bomar, Vanderbilt

===== Tackles =====
- Fred Sington, Alabama

===== Guards =====
- Herman Hickman, Tennessee

===== Punter =====
- Ralph Kercheval, Kentucky

=== Heisman ===
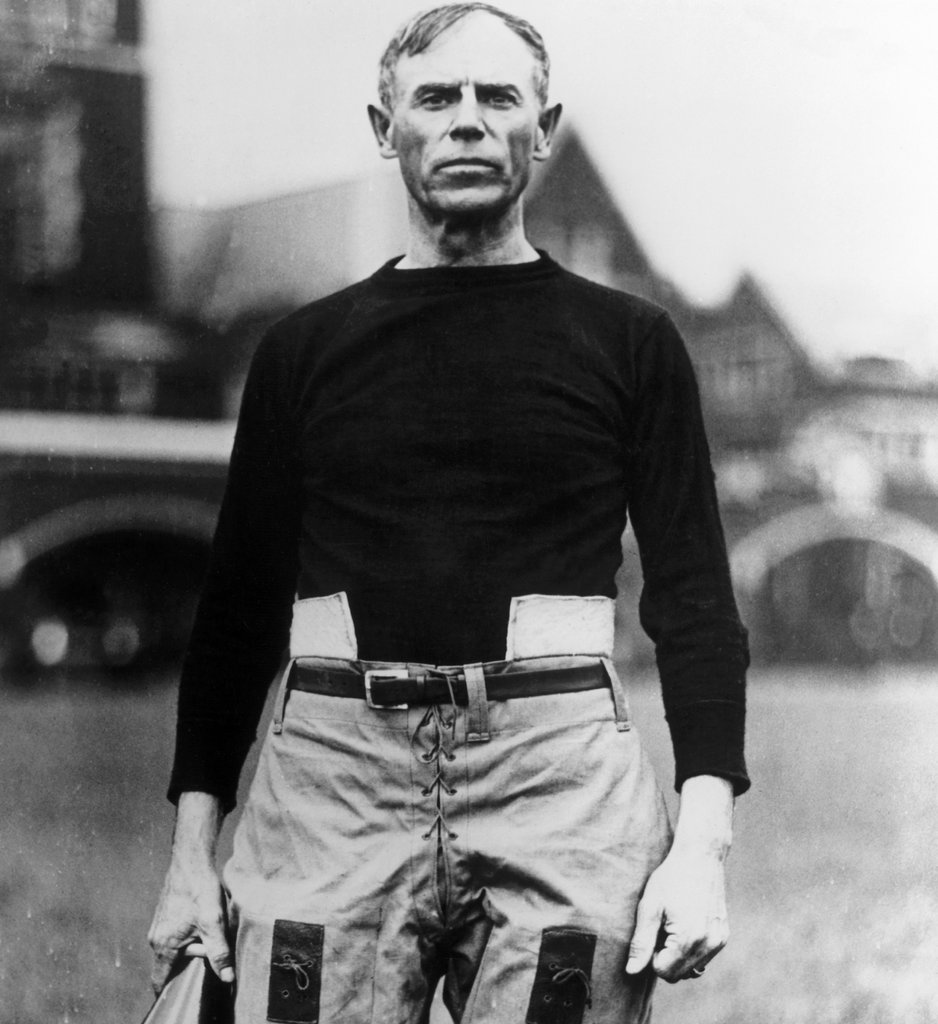
Coach John Heisman, one of the most notable selectors of All-Southern teams.

John Heisman would sometimes post all-time All-Southern teams. His selection of 1916 includes:

==== Ends ====
- Bob Blake, Vanderbilt
- Graham Vowell, Tennessee

==== Tackles ====
- Josh Cody, Vanderbilt
- Walker Carpenter, Georgia Tech

==== Guards ====
- Henry D. Phillips, Sewanee
- Baby Taylor, Auburn

==== Center ====
- Stein Stone, Vanderbilt

==== Quarterback ====
- Ray Morrison, Vanderbilt

==== Halfbacks ====
- Everett Strupper, Georgia Tech
- Honus Craig, Vanderbilt

==== Fullback ====
- Owsley Manier, Vanderbilt

=== Blake ===
Morgan Blake posted this humorous All-time All-Southern team.

==== Ends ====
- Jeb Stuart
- Nathan Bedford Forrest

==== Tackles ====
- Stonewall Jackson
- Patrick Henry

==== Guards ====
- Ollie James
- Dr. Ben Swanson

==== Centers ====
- Champ Clark

==== Quarterbacks ====
- Woodrow Wilson

==== Halfbacks ====
- George Washington
- Thomas Jefferson

==== Fullbacks ====
- Andrew Jackson

== See also ==
- Early history of American football
