= 1930 Presbyterian Blue Hose football team =

American college football season

1930 Presbyterian Blue Hose football

SIAA champion
- Conference: Southern Intercollegiate Athletic Association
- Record: 9–1 (6–0 SIAA)
- Head coach: Walter A. Johnson (15th season)
- Home stadium: Bailey Stadium

1930 Southern Intercollegiate Athletic Association football standings
| | Conf. | | | | | Overall |
| Team | W | | L | | T | W | | L | | T |
|---|---|---|---|---|---|---|---|---|---|---|
| Presbyterian $ | 6 | – | 0 | – | 0 | 9 | – | 1 | – | 0 |
| Centre | 5 | – | 0 | – | 0 | 7 | – | 3 | – | 0 |
| Spring Hill | 4 | – | 0 | – | 0 | 6 | – | 2 | – | 0 |
| Loyola (LA) | 2 | – | 0 | – | 0 | 9 | – | 1 | – | 0 |
| Centenary | 2 | – | 0 | – | 0 | 8 | – | 1 | – | 1 |
| Western Kentucky State Teachers | 6 | – | 1 | – | 0 | 8 | – | 1 | – | 1 |
| Louisiana Normal | 4 | – | 1 | – | 0 | 7 | – | 2 | – | 0 |
| Mississippi College | 4 | – | 1 | – | 0 | 7 | – | 2 | – | 0 |
| The Citadel | 3 | – | 1 | – | 1 | 4 | – | 5 | – | 2 |
| Kentucky Wesleyan | 2 | – | 1 | – | 1 | 2 | – | 4 | – | 3 |
| Chattanooga | 3 | – | 2 | – | 1 | 5 | – | 3 | – | 2 |
| Mercer | 3 | – | 2 | – | 0 | 4 | – | 5 | – | 0 |
| Millsaps | 3 | – | 3 | – | 0 | 6 | – | 3 | – | 0 |
| Louisville | 2 | – | 2 | – | 0 | 5 | – | 3 | – | 0 |
| Birmingham–Southern | 3 | – | 3 | – | 0 | 5 | – | 4 | – | 0 |
| Stetson | 3 | – | 3 | – | 0 | 5 | – | 3 | – | 0 |
| Howard (AL) | 2 | – | 3 | – | 0 | 5 | – | 5 | – | 0 |
| Miami (FL) | 2 | – | 3 | – | 1 | 3 | – | 4 | – | 1 |
| Southwestern (TN) | 1 | – | 2 | – | 0 | 6 | – | 3 | – | 0 |
| Erskine | 1 | – | 2 | – | 1 | 2 | – | 5 | – | 1 |
| Louisiana Tech | 2 | – | 5 | – | 0 | 3 | – | 6 | – | 0 |
| Georgetown (KY) | 1 | – | 3 | – | 0 | 2 | – | 7 | – | 0 |
| Wofford | 1 | – | 3 | – | 0 | 2 | – | 9 | – | 0 |
| Union (TN) | 1 | – | 4 | – | 0 | 1 | – | 5 | – | 2 |
| Transylvania | 1 | – | 4 | – | 1 | 1 | – | 5 | – | 2 |
| Louisiana College | 1 | – | 5 | – | 0 | 2 | – | 6 | – | 0 |
| SW Louisiana | 1 | – | 5 | – | 0 | 2 | – | 8 | – | 0 |
| Rollins | 0 | – | 0 | – | 2 | 2 | – | 1 | – | 3 |
| Newberry | 0 | – | 2 | – | 1 | 0 | – | 5 | – | 3 |
| Southern College | 0 | – | 4 | – | 1 | 0 | – | 6 | – | 1 |
| Eastern Kentucky | 0 | – | 4 | – | 0 | 1 | – | 7 | – | 0 |
$ – Conference champion

The 1930 Presbyterian Blue Hose football team represented Presbyterian College as a member the Southern Intercollegiate Athletic Association (SIAA) during the 1930 college football season. Led by 15th-year head coach Walter A. Johnson, the Blue Hose compiled an overall record of 9–1, with a mark of 6–0 in conference play, and won the SIAA championship.

== Schedule ==
| Date | Opponent | Site | Result | Source |
|---|---|---|---|---|
| September 20 | at Clemson* | Riggs Field; Clemson, SC | L 7–28 | |
| September 27 | at Mercer | Centennial Stadium; Macon, GA | W 9–7 | |
| October 4 | at Chattanooga | Chamberlain Field; Chattanooga, TN | W 7–6 | |
| October 9 | High Point* | Bailey Stadium; Clinton, SC | W 41–0 | |
| October 18 | Wofford | Bailey Stadium; Clinton, SC | W 14–0 | |
| October 25 | at The Citadel | Johnson Hagood Stadium; Charleston, SC | W 6–0 | |
| November 1 | vs. NC State* | Memorial Stadium; Asheville, NC | W 2–0 | |
| November 8 | vs. Wake Forest* | Memorial Stadium; Asheville, NC | W 13–0 | |
| November 14 | Erskine | Bailey Stadium; Clinton, SC | W 18–0 | |
| November 27 | at Newberry | Setzler Field; Newberry, SC | W 31–0 | |
*Non-conference game
