= 1930 Newberry Indians football team =

American college football season

1930 Newberry Indians football
- Conference: Southern Intercollegiate Athletic Association
- Record: 0–5–3 (0–2–1 SIAA)
- Head coach: Dutch McClean (11th season)
- Home stadium: Setzler Field

1930 Southern Intercollegiate Athletic Association football standings
	Conf.					Overall
Team	W		L		T	W		L		T
Presbyterian $	6	–	0	–	0	9	–	1	–	0
Centre	5	–	0	–	0	7	–	3	–	0
Spring Hill	4	–	0	–	0	6	–	2	–	0
Loyola (LA)	2	–	0	–	0	9	–	1	–	0
Centenary	2	–	0	–	0	8	–	1	–	1
Western Kentucky State Teachers	6	–	1	–	0	8	–	1	–	1
Louisiana Normal	4	–	1	–	0	7	–	2	–	0
Mississippi College	4	–	1	–	0	7	–	2	–	0
The Citadel	3	–	1	–	1	4	–	5	–	2
Kentucky Wesleyan	2	–	1	–	1	2	–	4	–	3
Chattanooga	3	–	2	–	1	5	–	3	–	2
Mercer	3	–	2	–	0	5	–	5	–	0
Millsaps	3	–	3	–	0	6	–	3	–	0
Louisville	2	–	2	–	0	5	–	3	–	0
Birmingham–Southern	3	–	3	–	0	5	–	4	–	0
Stetson	3	–	3	–	0	5	–	3	–	0
Howard (AL)	2	–	3	–	0	5	–	5	–	0
Miami (FL)	2	–	3	–	1	3	–	4	–	1
Southwestern (TN)	1	–	2	–	0	6	–	3	–	0
Erskine	1	–	2	–	1	2	–	5	–	1
Louisiana Tech	2	–	5	–	0	3	–	6	–	0
Georgetown (KY)	1	–	3	–	0	2	–	7	–	0
Wofford	1	–	3	–	0	2	–	9	–	0
Union (TN)	1	–	4	–	0	1	–	5	–	2
Transylvania	1	–	4	–	1	1	–	5	–	2
Louisiana College	1	–	5	–	0	2	–	6	–	0
SW Louisiana	1	–	5	–	0	2	–	8	–	0
Rollins	0	–	0	–	2	2	–	1	–	3
Newberry	0	–	2	–	1	0	–	5	–	3
Southern College	0	–	4	–	1	0	–	6	–	1
Eastern Kentucky	0	–	4	–	0	1	–	7	–	0
$ – Conference champion

The 1930 Newberry Indians football team represented Newberry College as a member the Southern Intercollegiate Athletic Association (SIAA) during the 1930 college football season. Led by eleventh-year head coach Dutch McClean, the Indians compiled an overall record of 0–5–3, with a mark of 0–2–1 in conference play.

== Schedule ==
Date	Opponent	Site	Result	Source
September 20	at Wofford	Snyder Field; Spartanburg, SC	L 0–43	
September 25	at Furman*	Manly Field; Greenville, SC	L 0–49	
October 3	vs. South Georgia Teachers*	Savannah, GA	T 0–0	
October 10	at Lenoir–Rhyne*	College Field; Hickory, NC	L 6–7	
October 17	at Clemson*	Riggs Field; Clemson, SC	L 0–75	
October 31	Erskine	Setzler Field; Newberry, SC	T 6–6	
November 7	Piedmont College*	Setzler Field; Newberry, SC	T 6–6	
November 27	Presbyterian	Setzler Field; Newberry, SC	L 0–31	
*Non-conference game
