= 1930 Louisiana College Wildcats football team =

American college football season

1930 Louisiana College Wildcats football
- Conference: Southern Intercollegiate Athletic Association
- Record: 2–6 (1–5 SIAA)
- Head coach: Henry E. Walden (8th season)
- Home stadium: Alumni Field

1930 Southern Intercollegiate Athletic Association football standings
	Conf.					Overall
Team	W		L		T	W		L		T
Presbyterian $	6	–	0	–	0	9	–	1	–	0
Centre	5	–	0	–	0	7	–	3	–	0
Spring Hill	4	–	0	–	0	6	–	2	–	0
Loyola (LA)	2	–	0	–	0	9	–	1	–	0
Centenary	2	–	0	–	0	8	–	1	–	1
Western Kentucky State Teachers	6	–	1	–	0	8	–	1	–	1
Louisiana Normal	4	–	1	–	0	7	–	2	–	0
Mississippi College	4	–	1	–	0	7	–	2	–	0
The Citadel	3	–	1	–	1	4	–	5	–	2
Kentucky Wesleyan	2	–	1	–	1	2	–	4	–	3
Chattanooga	3	–	2	–	1	5	–	3	–	2
Mercer	3	–	2	–	0	5	–	5	–	0
Millsaps	3	–	3	–	0	6	–	3	–	0
Louisville	2	–	2	–	0	5	–	3	–	0
Birmingham–Southern	3	–	3	–	0	5	–	4	–	0
Stetson	3	–	3	–	0	5	–	3	–	0
Howard (AL)	2	–	3	–	0	5	–	5	–	0
Miami (FL)	2	–	3	–	1	3	–	4	–	1
Southwestern (TN)	1	–	2	–	0	6	–	3	–	0
Erskine	1	–	2	–	1	2	–	5	–	1
Louisiana Tech	2	–	5	–	0	3	–	6	–	0
Georgetown (KY)	1	–	3	–	0	2	–	7	–	0
Wofford	1	–	3	–	0	2	–	9	–	0
Union (TN)	1	–	4	–	0	1	–	5	–	2
Transylvania	1	–	4	–	1	1	–	5	–	2
Louisiana College	1	–	5	–	0	2	–	6	–	0
SW Louisiana	1	–	5	–	0	2	–	8	–	0
Rollins	0	–	0	–	2	2	–	1	–	3
Newberry	0	–	2	–	1	0	–	5	–	3
Florida Southern	0	–	4	–	1	0	–	6	–	1
Eastern Kentucky	0	–	4	–	0	1	–	7	–	0
$ – Conference champion

The 1930 Louisiana College Wildcats football team was an American football team that represented Louisiana College (now known as Louisiana Christian University) as a member of the Southern Intercollegiate Athletic Association (SIAA) during the 1930 college football season. Led by Henry E. Walden in his eighth season as head coach, the Wildcats compiled an overall record of 2–6.

== Schedule ==
Date	Opponent	Site	Result	Source
September 27	Mississippi College	Alumni Field; Pineville, LA	L 14–33	
October 4	UNAM*	Alumni Field; Pineville, LA	W 33–0	
October 18	Louisiana Normal	Alumni Field; Pineville, LA	L 6–18	
October 25	at Mississippi State Teachers*	State Teachers Field; Hattiesburg, MS	L 20–47	
November 1	Southwestern Louisiana	Alumni Field; Pineville, LA	W 18–13	
November 8	at Southwestern (TN)	Fargason Field; Memphis, TN	L 0–57	
November 11	at Union (TN)	Athletic Field; Jackson, TN	L 7–14	
November 29	at Louisiana Tech	Tech Stadium; Ruston, LA	L 0–6	
*Non-conference game
