= 1930 Wofford Terriers football team =

American college football season

1930 Wofford Terriers football
- Conference: Southern Intercollegiate Athletic Association
- Record: 2–9 (1–3 SIAA)
- Head coach: Tommy Scaffe (4th season)
- Home stadium: Snyder Field

1930 Southern Intercollegiate Athletic Association football standings
	Conf.					Overall
Team	W		L		T	W		L		T
Presbyterian $	6	–	0	–	0	9	–	1	–	0
Centre	5	–	0	–	0	7	–	3	–	0
Spring Hill	4	–	0	–	0	6	–	2	–	0
Loyola (LA)	2	–	0	–	0	9	–	1	–	0
Centenary	2	–	0	–	0	8	–	1	–	1
Western Kentucky State Teachers	6	–	1	–	0	8	–	1	–	1
Louisiana Normal	4	–	1	–	0	7	–	2	–	0
Mississippi College	4	–	1	–	0	7	–	2	–	0
The Citadel	3	–	1	–	1	4	–	5	–	2
Kentucky Wesleyan	2	–	1	–	1	2	–	4	–	3
Chattanooga	3	–	2	–	1	5	–	3	–	2
Mercer	3	–	2	–	0	4	–	5	–	0
Millsaps	3	–	3	–	0	6	–	3	–	0
Louisville	2	–	2	–	0	5	–	3	–	0
Birmingham–Southern	3	–	3	–	0	5	–	4	–	0
Stetson	3	–	3	–	0	5	–	3	–	0
Howard (AL)	2	–	3	–	0	5	–	5	–	0
Miami (FL)	2	–	3	–	1	3	–	4	–	1
Southwestern (TN)	1	–	2	–	0	6	–	3	–	0
Erskine	1	–	2	–	1	2	–	5	–	1
Louisiana Tech	2	–	5	–	0	3	–	6	–	0
Georgetown (KY)	1	–	3	–	0	2	–	7	–	0
Wofford	1	–	3	–	0	2	–	9	–	0
Union (TN)	1	–	4	–	0	1	–	5	–	2
Transylvania	1	–	4	–	1	1	–	5	–	2
Louisiana College	1	–	5	–	0	2	–	6	–	0
SW Louisiana	1	–	5	–	0	2	–	8	–	0
Rollins	0	–	0	–	2	2	–	1	–	3
Newberry	0	–	2	–	1	0	–	5	–	3
Southern College	0	–	4	–	1	0	–	6	–	1
Eastern Kentucky	0	–	4	–	0	1	–	7	–	0
$ – Conference champion

The 1930 Wofford Terriers football team represented Wofford College as a member the Southern Intercollegiate Athletic Association (SIAA) during the 1930 college football season. Led by fourth-year head coach Tommy Scaffe, the Terriers compiled an overall record of 2–9, with a mark of 1–3 in conference play.

== Schedule ==
Date	Opponent	Site	Result	Source
September 20	Newberry	Snyder Field; Spartanburg, SC	W 43–0	
September 27	at Clemson*	Riggs Field; Clemson, SC	L 0–32	
October 4	High Point*	Snyder Field; Spartanburg, SC	W 12–6	
October 11	at William & Mary*	Cary Field; Williamsburg, VA	L 0–19	
October 18	at Presbyterian	Bailey Stadium; Clinton, SC	L 0–14	
October 25	Duke*	Snyder Field; Spartanburg, SC	L 0–14	
November 1	at Auburn*	Drake Field; Auburn, AL	L 6–38	
November 8	at Davidson*	Richardson Field; Davidson, NC	L 0–13	
November 15	Furman*	Snyder Field; Spartanburg, SC	L 0–14	
November 22	Erskine	Snyder Field; Spartanburg, SC	L 0–7	
November 29	The Citadel	Snyder Field; Spartanburg, SC	L 6–7	
*Non-conference game
