= Stetson Hatters football, 1920–1929 =

American college football season

1920–1929 Stetson Hatters football
- Conference: Independent (1920–1925); SIAA (1926–1929)
- Head coach: Horace Allen (1920–1923); Herb McQuillan (1924–1929)
- Home stadium: Cummings Field; Hulley Field

The Stetson Hatters football program, 1920–1929 represented John B. Stetson University—now known as Stetson University—during the 1920s in college football as an independent until 1925 and then as a member of the Southern Intercollegiate Athletic Association (SIAA) from 1926 onward. The team was led by two different head coaches: Horace Allen who held the position from 1919 to 1923 and Herb McQuillan who held the position from 1924 to 1934. During the 1920s, the Hatters compiled a 44–19–3 record, finished undefeated twice, and recorded seven winning seasons in ten years of competition. Highlights of the decade include:

- The 1924 Stetson Hatters football team compiled an undefeated 6–0 season, a then-record of wins in a season.
- The 1926 team compiled a 5–1–1 record, went 3–1 in Southern Intercollegiate Athletic Association (SIAA) play, and finished tied for fourth in the team's first season in the conference.
- The 1927 team compiled an undefeated 6–0–1 season.

The team played its home games at Cummings Field and Hulley Field in DeLand, Florida.

== Decade overview ==
Year	Head coach	Overall record	Conf. record	Conf. rank	Points scored	Points allowed	Delta
1920	Horace Allen	2–4			33	88	-55
1921	Horace Allen	1–4			25	114	-89
1922	Horace Allen	4–2			185	41	+144
1923	Horace Allen	5–2			186	53	+132
1924	Herb McQuillan	6–0			194	22	+172
1925	Herb McQuillan	6–2–1			110	89	+21
1926	Herb McQuillan	5–1–1	3–1	T–4th	152	26	+126
1927	Herb McQuillan	6–0–1	4–0–1	6th	193	13	+180
1928	Herb McQuillan	4–3	2–3	T–18th	72	72	0
1929	Herb McQuillan	5–1	3–1	T–9th	123	33	+90
Total		44–19–3	12–5–1		1,274	551	+723

== 1920 ==
1920 Stetson Hatters football
- Conference: Independent
- Record: 2–4
- Head coach: Horace Allen (2nd season)
- Captain: Russell "Bus" Rasco

The 1920 Stetson Hatters football team represented John B. Stetson University—now known as Stetson University—as an independent during the 1920 college football season. In their second year under head coach Horace Allen, the Hatters compiled a 2–4 record and were outscored by opponents by a total of 88 to 33.

=== Schedule ===
Date	Time	Opponent	Site	Result	Attendance	Source
		at Jacksonville American Legion	Jacksonville, FL	W 7–0		
October 30		vs. Southern College	Sutherland, FL	L 0–14		
November 5		Mercer	DeLand, FL	L 6–21		
November 11		vs. Florida	Palatka, FL	L 0–26	3,000+	
November 20		at Florida	Fleming Field; Gainesville, FL	L 0–20		
November 25	3:45 p.m.	Southern College	DeLand, FL	W 20–7		
All times are in Eastern time

== 1921 ==
1921 Stetson Hatters football
- Conference: Independent
- Record: 1–4
- Head coach: Horace Allen (3rd season)
- Captain: Bob Davis

The 1921 Stetson Hatters football team represented John B. Stetson University—now known as Stetson University—as an independent during the 1921 college football season. In their third year under head coach Horace Allen, the Hatters compiled a 1–4 record and were outscored by opponents by a total of 114 to 25.

=== Schedule ===
Date	Opponent	Site	Result	Source
October 22	Rollins	DeLand, FL	L 0–13	
October 28	at Mercer	Alumni Field; Macon, GA	L 0–41	
November 4	Oglethorpe	DeLand, FL	L 0–41	
	Bartlow Aviators		L 0–19	
	Orlando American Legion		W 25–0	

== 1922 ==
1922 Stetson Hatters football
- Conference: Independent
- Record: 4–2
- Head coach: Horace Allen (4th season)
- Captain: Harold Schubiger

The 1922 Stetson Hatters football team represented John B. Stetson University—now known as Stetson University—as an independent during the 1922 college football season. In their fourth year under head coach Horace Allen, the Hatters compiled a 4–2 record and outscored opponents by a total of 185 to 41.

=== Schedule ===
Date	Time	Opponent	Site	Result	Attendance	Source
October 21	3:00 p.m.	at Southern College	Adair Park; Lakeland, FL	W 52–0		
October 28		at Palatka All-Stars	Pals Field; Palatka, FL	W 45–0		
November 4		Lauderdale American Legion	DeLand, FL	W 53–0		
November 11		vs. Tampa American Legion	Tavares, FL	L 0–16	1,500	
November 18		Southern College	DeLand, FL	W 35–0		
November 23		at Rollins	Winter Park, FL	L 0–25		
All times are in Eastern time

== 1923 ==
1923 Stetson Hatters football
- Conference: Independent
- Record: 5–2
- Head coach: Horace Allen (5th season)
- Captain: Lloyd Boyle

The 1923 Stetson Hatters football team represented John B. Stetson University—now known as Stetson University—as an independent during the 1923 college football season. In their fifth and final year under head coach Horace Allen, the Hatters compiled a 5–2 record and outscored opponents by a total of 186 to 53.

=== Schedule ===
Date	Opponent	Site	Result	Source
October 6	Springfield Athletic Club		W 33–0	
October 13	at Southern College	Adair Field; Lakeland, FL	L 13–14	
	St. Augustine American Legion		W 53–0	
November 3	Southern College	DeLand, FL	W 27–6	
November 10	Florida	DeLand, FL	L 0–27	
	Seabreeze		W 44–0	
November 29	Rollins	DeLand, FL	W 15–7	

== 1924 ==
1924 Stetson Hatters football
- Conference: Independent
- Record: 6–0
- Head coach: Herb McQuillan (1st season)
- Captain: Kirk Gunby
- Home stadium: Cummings Field

The 1924 Stetson Hatters football team represented John B. Stetson University—now known as Stetson University—as an independent during the 1924 college football season. In their first year under head coach Herb McQuillan, the Hatters compiled a perfect 6–0 record and outscored opponents by a total of 194 to 22.

Stetson was a member of the Florida State University and College Athletic Association, but refused to abide by the association's policy of not having migrant players, which caused at least three games against fellow Florida opponents to be canceled.

=== Schedule ===
Date	Opponent	Site	Result	Source
October 4	Florida	Cummings Field; DeLand, FL	Canceled	
October 11	at Pensacola NAS	Gifford Field; Pensacola, FL	W 16–0	
October 25	Southern College		Canceled	
October 25	Piedmont	Cummings Field; DeLand, FL	W 43–0	
November 1	Louisiana College	Cummings Field; DeLand, FL	W 32–0	
November 8	Newberry	Cummings Field; DeLand, FL	W 26–2	
November 17	Mississippi State Teachers	Cummings Field; DeLand, FL	W 46–6	
November 27	at Rollins	Winter Park, FL	Canceled	
November 27	Cumberland (TN)	Cummings Field; DeLand, FL	W 31–14	

== 1925 ==
1925 Stetson Hatters football
- Conference: Independent
- Record: 6–2–1
- Head coach: Herb McQuillan (2nd season)
- Captain: Lloyd Layton
- Home stadium: Cummings Field

The 1925 Stetson Hatters football team represented John B. Stetson University—now known as Stetson University—as an independent during the 1925 college football season. In their second year under head coach Herb McQuillan, the Hatters compiled a 6–2–1 record and outscored opponents by a total of 117 to 89.

=== Schedule ===
Date	Opponent	Site	Result	Source
September 26	at Fort Benning	Doughboys Stadium; Columbus, GA	L 7–51	
October 3	Palmer	Cummings Field; DeLand, FL	W 34–13	
October 10	Norman	Cummings Field; DeLand, FL	W 16–0	
October 17	at Fulford-by-the-Sea	Miami, FL	Canceled	
October 24	at South Georgia A&M	Tifton, GA	Postponed	
October 26	at South Georgia A&M	Tifton, GA	W 18–0	
October 31	at Spring Hill	Monroe Park; Mobile, AL	W 6–5	
November 7	Carson–Newman^{†}	Cummings Field; DeLand, FL	T 0–0	
November 14	at Mississippi State Teachers	Kamper Park; Hattiesburg, MS	Canceled	
November 14	at Newberry	Newberry, SC	L 0–20	
November 26	Middle Tennessee State Teachers	Cummings Field; DeLand, FL	W 10–0	
	Daytona Athletic Club		W 26–0	
^{†}Homecoming

== 1926 ==
1926 Stetson Hatters football
- Conference: Southern Intercollegiate Athletic Association
- Record: 5–1–1 (3–1 SIAA)
- Head coach: Herb McQuillan (3rd season)
- Captain: Spot Courtney
- Home stadium: Cummings Field

The 1926 Stetson Hatters football team represented John B. Stetson University—now known as Stetson University—as a member of the Southern Intercollegiate Athletic Association (SIAA) during the 1926 college football season. In their third year under head coach Herb McQuillan, the Hatters compiled a 5–1–1 record (3–1 in conference) and outscored opponents by a total of 153 to 26.

Former captain Kirk Gunby returned to Stetson as the line coach.

=== Schedule ===
Date	Opponent	Site	Result	Attendance	Source
September 25	at The Citadel	College Park Stadium; Charleston, SC	L 7–14		
October 9	Newberry	Cummings Field; DeLand, FL	W 18–0		
October 16	vs. Spring Hill*	Plant Field; Tampa, FL	T 0–0		
October 30	at Rollins	Winter Park, FL	W 34–0		
November 6	Southern College^{†}	Cummings Field; DeLand, FL	W 17–0	2,300	
November 19	South Georgia A&M*	Cummings Field; DeLand, FL	W 63–0		
November 25	vs. Maryville (TN)*	Municipal Athletic Field; Sanford, FL	W 14–12	3,000	
*Non-conference game; ^{†}Homecoming

== 1927 ==
1927 Stetson Hatters football
- Conference: Southern Intercollegiate Athletic Association
- Record: 6–0–1 (4–0–1 SIAA)
- Head coach: Herb McQuillan (4th season)
- Captain: Larry Bernard
- Home stadium: Cummings Field

The 1927 Stetson Hatters football team represented John B. Stetson University—now known as Stetson University—as a member of the Southern Intercollegiate Athletic Association (SIAA) during the 1927 college football season. In their fourth year under head coach Herb McQuillan, the Hatters compiled a perfect 6–0–1 record (4–0–1 in conference) and outscored opponents by a total of 193 to 13.

=== Schedule ===
Date	Time	Opponent	Site	Result	Source
September 24		at Auburn*	Drake Field; Auburn, AL	W 6–0	
October 15		Newberry	Cummings Field; DeLand, FL	W 24–0	
October 29		at Southern College	Lakeland, FL	T 6–6	
November 5		Rollins^{†}	Cummings Field; DeLand, FL	W 75–0	
November 11		vs. Louisiana Tech	Jacksonville, FL	W 19–7	
November 19	2:30 p.m.	at Miami (FL)*	University Stadium; Coral Gables, FL	W 36–0	
November 26		Centre	Cummings Field; DeLand, FL	W 27–0	
*Non-conference game; ^{†}Homecoming; All times are in Eastern time

== 1928 ==
1928 Stetson Hatters football
- Conference: Southern Intercollegiate Athletic Association
- Record: 4–3 (2–3 SIAA)
- Head coach: Herb McQuillan (5th season)
- Captain: Burdette "Bert" Eustice
- Home stadium: Cummings Field

The 1928 Stetson Hatters football team represented John B. Stetson University—now known as Stetson University—as a member of the Southern Intercollegiate Athletic Association (SIAA) during the 1928 college football season. In their fifth year under head coach Herb McQuillan, the Hatters compiled a 4–3 record (2–3 in conference). The team finished with a point differential of 0, with 72 points for and 72 points against.

=== Schedule ===
Date	Time	Opponent	Site	Result	Attendance	Source
October 6		at The Citadel	Johnson Hagood Stadium; Charleston, SC	L 0–39		
October 20	3:00 p.m.	at Rollins	Winter Park, FL	W 19–6	500+	
November 3		Southern College	Cummings Field; DeLand, FL	L 0–13		
November 10		vs. Newberry	Daytona Beach, FL	W 19–0		
November 17	3:00 p.m.	at Miami (FL)*	University Stadium; Coral Gables, FL	W 15–6		
		Tampa Independents*		W 13–0		
December 1		Howard (AL)	Cummings Field; DeLand, FL	L 6–8		
*Non-conference game; All times are in Eastern time

== 1929 ==
1929 Stetson Hatters football
- Conference: Southern Intercollegiate Athletic Association
- Record: 5–1 (3–1 SIAA)
- Head coach: Herb McQuillan (6th season)
- Captain: Bill Mox
- Home stadium: Hulley Field

The 1929 Stetson Hatters football team represented John B. Stetson University—now known as Stetson University—as a member of the Southern Intercollegiate Athletic Association (SIAA) during the 1929 college football season. In their sixth year under head coach Herb McQuillan, the Hatters compiled a 5–1 record (3–1 in conference) and outscored opponents by a total of 123 to 33.

On October 10, Stetson debuted on their new football field, Hulley Field, against Rollins. The field was dedicated to the university's president, Lincoln Hulley.

=== Schedule ===
Date	Time	Opponent	Site	Result	Attendance	Source
	at	Norman*	Norman Park, GA	W 12–0		
October 10		Rollins	Hulley Field; DeLand, FL	W 20–0		
November 2		at Southern College	Lakeland, FL	W 45–19		
November 9	3:00 p.m.	at St. Petersburg*	St. Petersburg High School Field; St. Petersburg, FL	W 19–0		
November 16	3:00 p.m.	at Miami (FL)	Miami High School Field; Miami, FL	W 12–0	4,000	
November 30		vs. Howard (AL)	Burgoyne Isle; Daytona Beach, FL	L 13–14		
*Non-conference game; All times are in Eastern time
