= 1930 Stetson Hatters football team =

American college football season

1930 Stetson Hatters football
- Conference: Southern Intercollegiate Athletic Association
- Record: 5–3 (3–3 SIAA)
- Head coach: Herb McQuillan (7th season)
- Home stadium: Hulley Field

1930 Southern Intercollegiate Athletic Association football standings
	Conf.					Overall
Team	W		L		T	W		L		T
Presbyterian $	6	–	0	–	0	9	–	1	–	0
Centre	5	–	0	–	0	7	–	3	–	0
Spring Hill	4	–	0	–	0	6	–	2	–	0
Loyola (LA)	2	–	0	–	0	9	–	1	–	0
Centenary	2	–	0	–	0	8	–	1	–	1
Western Kentucky State Teachers	6	–	1	–	0	8	–	1	–	1
Louisiana Normal	4	–	1	–	0	7	–	2	–	0
Mississippi College	4	–	1	–	0	7	–	2	–	0
The Citadel	3	–	1	–	1	4	–	5	–	2
Kentucky Wesleyan	2	–	1	–	1	2	–	4	–	3
Chattanooga	3	–	2	–	1	5	–	3	–	2
Mercer	3	–	2	–	0	4	–	5	–	0
Millsaps	3	–	3	–	0	6	–	3	–	0
Louisville	2	–	2	–	0	5	–	3	–	0
Birmingham–Southern	3	–	3	–	0	5	–	4	–	0
Stetson	3	–	3	–	0	5	–	3	–	0
Howard (AL)	2	–	3	–	0	5	–	5	–	0
Miami (FL)	2	–	3	–	1	3	–	4	–	1
Southwestern (TN)	1	–	2	–	0	6	–	3	–	0
Erskine	1	–	2	–	1	2	–	5	–	1
Louisiana Tech	2	–	5	–	0	3	–	6	–	0
Georgetown (KY)	1	–	3	–	0	2	–	7	–	0
Wofford	1	–	3	–	0	2	–	9	–	0
Union (TN)	1	–	4	–	0	1	–	5	–	2
Transylvania	1	–	4	–	1	1	–	5	–	2
Louisiana College	1	–	5	–	0	2	–	6	–	0
SW Louisiana	1	–	5	–	0	2	–	8	–	0
Rollins	0	–	0	–	2	2	–	1	–	3
Newberry	0	–	2	–	1	0	–	5	–	3
Southern College	0	–	4	–	1	0	–	6	–	1
Eastern Kentucky	0	–	4	–	0	1	–	7	–	0
$ – Conference champion

The 1930 Stetson Hatters football team represented Stetson College as a member the Southern Intercollegiate Athletic Association (SIAA) during the 1930 college football season. Led by seventh-year head coach Herb McQuillan, the Hatters compiled an overall record of 5–3, with a mark of 3–3 in conference play.

== Schedule ==
Date	Opponent	Site	Result	Source
September 20	at The Citadel	Johnson Hagood Stadium; Charleston, SC	L 7–13	
October 3	Norman College*	Hulley Field; DeLand, FL	W 1–0 (Norman forfeit)	
October 16	at Millsaps	Municipal Stadium; Jackson, MS	W 13–0	
October 20	at Centenary	Biedenharn Park; Shreveport, LA	L 0–9	
November 1	at St. Petersburg*	St. Petersburg High School field; St. Petersburg, FL	W 58–0	
November 6	Mercer	Hulley Field; DeLand, FL	L 0–33	
November 22	Southern College	Hulley Field; DeLand, FL	W 52–0	
November 28	at Miami (FL)	Moore Park; Miami, FL	W 19–0	
*Non-conference game
