= 1930 Centre Colonels football team =

American college football season

1930 Centre Colonels football
- Conference: Southern Intercollegiate Athletic Association
- Record: 7–3 (5–0 SIAA)
- Head coach: Ed Kubale (2nd season)
- Home stadium: Cheek Field

1930 Southern Intercollegiate Athletic Association football standings
| | Conf. | | | | | Overall |
| Team | W | | L | | T | W | | L | | T |
|---|---|---|---|---|---|---|---|---|---|---|
| Presbyterian $ | 6 | – | 0 | – | 0 | 9 | – | 1 | – | 0 |
| Centre | 5 | – | 0 | – | 0 | 7 | – | 3 | – | 0 |
| Spring Hill | 4 | – | 0 | – | 0 | 6 | – | 2 | – | 0 |
| Loyola (LA) | 2 | – | 0 | – | 0 | 9 | – | 1 | – | 0 |
| Centenary | 2 | – | 0 | – | 0 | 8 | – | 1 | – | 1 |
| Western Kentucky State Teachers | 6 | – | 1 | – | 0 | 8 | – | 1 | – | 1 |
| Louisiana Normal | 4 | – | 1 | – | 0 | 7 | – | 2 | – | 0 |
| Mississippi College | 4 | – | 1 | – | 0 | 7 | – | 2 | – | 0 |
| The Citadel | 3 | – | 1 | – | 1 | 4 | – | 5 | – | 2 |
| Kentucky Wesleyan | 2 | – | 1 | – | 1 | 2 | – | 4 | – | 3 |
| Chattanooga | 3 | – | 2 | – | 1 | 5 | – | 3 | – | 2 |
| Mercer | 3 | – | 2 | – | 0 | 4 | – | 5 | – | 0 |
| Millsaps | 3 | – | 3 | – | 0 | 6 | – | 3 | – | 0 |
| Louisville | 2 | – | 2 | – | 0 | 5 | – | 3 | – | 0 |
| Birmingham–Southern | 3 | – | 3 | – | 0 | 5 | – | 4 | – | 0 |
| Stetson | 3 | – | 3 | – | 0 | 5 | – | 3 | – | 0 |
| Howard (AL) | 2 | – | 3 | – | 0 | 5 | – | 5 | – | 0 |
| Miami (FL) | 2 | – | 3 | – | 1 | 3 | – | 4 | – | 1 |
| Southwestern (TN) | 1 | – | 2 | – | 0 | 6 | – | 3 | – | 0 |
| Erskine | 1 | – | 2 | – | 1 | 2 | – | 5 | – | 1 |
| Louisiana Tech | 2 | – | 5 | – | 0 | 3 | – | 6 | – | 0 |
| Georgetown (KY) | 1 | – | 3 | – | 0 | 2 | – | 7 | – | 0 |
| Wofford | 1 | – | 3 | – | 0 | 2 | – | 9 | – | 0 |
| Union (TN) | 1 | – | 4 | – | 0 | 1 | – | 5 | – | 2 |
| Transylvania | 1 | – | 4 | – | 1 | 1 | – | 5 | – | 2 |
| Louisiana College | 1 | – | 5 | – | 0 | 2 | – | 6 | – | 0 |
| SW Louisiana | 1 | – | 5 | – | 0 | 2 | – | 8 | – | 0 |
| Rollins | 0 | – | 0 | – | 2 | 2 | – | 1 | – | 3 |
| Newberry | 0 | – | 2 | – | 1 | 0 | – | 5 | – | 3 |
| Southern College | 0 | – | 4 | – | 1 | 0 | – | 6 | – | 1 |
| Eastern Kentucky | 0 | – | 4 | – | 0 | 1 | – | 7 | – | 0 |
$ – Conference champion

The 1930 Centre Colonels football team represented Centre College as a member the Southern Intercollegiate Athletic Association (SIAA) during the 1930 college football season. Led by second-year head coach Ed Kubale, the Colonels compiled an overall record of 7–3, with a mark of 5–0 in conference play. The team played home games at Cheek Field in Danville, Kentucky.

== Schedule ==
| Date | Opponent | Site | Result | Source |
|---|---|---|---|---|
| September 27 | Western Kentucky State Teachers | Cheek Field; Danville, KY | W 31–0 | |
| October 4 | at Tennessee* | Shields–Watkins Field; Knoxville, TN | L 0–18 | |
| October 11 | at Chattanooga | Chamberlain Field; Chattanooga, TN | W 7–6 | |
| October 17 | at Xavier* | Corcoran Field; Cincinnati, OH | W 6–0 | |
| October 25 | at Northwestern* | Dyche Stadium; Evanston, IL | L 7–45 | |
| November 1 | at Louisville | Parkway Field; Louisville, KY | W 28–0 | |
| November 8 | Wabash* | Cheek Field; Danville, KY | W 53–0 | |
| November 15 | Transylvania | Cheek Field; Danville, KY | W 32–0 | |
| November 22 | at Kansas State* | Memorial Stadium; Manhattan, KS | L 0–27 | |
| November 27 | at Georgetown (KY) | Georgetown, KY | W 22–0 | |
*Non-conference game
