= 1930 Howard Bulldogs football team =

American college football season

1930 Howard Bulldogs football
- Conference: Southern Intercollegiate Athletic Association
- Record: 5–5 (2–3 SIAA)
- Head coach: Eddie McLane (2nd season)
- Home stadium: Legion Field

1930 Southern Intercollegiate Athletic Association football standings
	Conf.					Overall
Team	W		L		T	W		L		T
Presbyterian $	6	–	0	–	0	9	–	1	–	0
Centre	5	–	0	–	0	7	–	3	–	0
Spring Hill	4	–	0	–	0	6	–	2	–	0
Loyola (LA)	2	–	0	–	0	9	–	1	–	0
Centenary	2	–	0	–	0	8	–	1	–	1
Western Kentucky State Teachers	6	–	1	–	0	8	–	1	–	1
Louisiana Normal	4	–	1	–	0	7	–	2	–	0
Mississippi College	4	–	1	–	0	7	–	2	–	0
The Citadel	3	–	1	–	1	4	–	5	–	2
Kentucky Wesleyan	2	–	1	–	1	2	–	4	–	3
Chattanooga	3	–	2	–	1	5	–	3	–	2
Mercer	3	–	2	–	0	4	–	5	–	0
Millsaps	3	–	3	–	0	6	–	3	–	0
Louisville	2	–	2	–	0	5	–	3	–	0
Birmingham–Southern	3	–	3	–	0	5	–	4	–	0
Stetson	3	–	3	–	0	5	–	3	–	0
Howard (AL)	2	–	3	–	0	5	–	5	–	0
Miami (FL)	2	–	3	–	1	3	–	4	–	1
Southwestern (TN)	1	–	2	–	0	6	–	3	–	0
Erskine	1	–	2	–	1	2	–	5	–	1
Louisiana Tech	2	–	5	–	0	3	–	6	–	0
Georgetown (KY)	1	–	3	–	0	2	–	7	–	0
Wofford	1	–	3	–	0	2	–	9	–	0
Union (TN)	1	–	4	–	0	1	–	5	–	2
Transylvania	1	–	4	–	1	1	–	5	–	2
Louisiana College	1	–	5	–	0	2	–	6	–	0
SW Louisiana	1	–	5	–	0	2	–	8	–	0
Rollins	0	–	0	–	2	2	–	1	–	3
Newberry	0	–	2	–	1	0	–	5	–	3
Southern College	0	–	4	–	1	0	–	6	–	1
Eastern Kentucky	0	–	4	–	0	1	–	7	–	0
$ – Conference champion

The 1930 Howard Bulldogs football team was an American football team that represented Howard College (now known as the Samford University) as a member of the Southern Intercollegiate Athletic Association (SIAA) during the 1930 college football season. In their second year under head coach Eddie McLane, the team compiled a 5–5 record.

== Schedule ==
Date	Opponent	Site	Result	Attendance	Source
September 19	Marion*	Legion Field; Birmingham, AL	W 51–0	2,500–3,000	
September 27	at Alabama*	Denny Stadium; Tuscaloosa, AL	L 0–43	6,000	
October 3	vs. Jacksonville State*	Johnston Field; Anniston, AL (rivalry)	W 20–0		
October 11	at Southwestern (TN)	Fargason Field; Memphis, TN	W 6–0		
October 17	at Duquesne*	Forbes Field; Pittsburgh, PA	L 9–14	5,000	
October 24	Maryville (TN)*	Legion Field; Birmingham, AL	W 14–6		
November 1	at Chattanooga	Chamberlain Field; Chattanooga, TN	L 9–13	10,000	
November 11	vs. Miami (FL)	Wiregrass Stadium; Dothan, AL	W 24–0	3,000	
November 23	Birmingham–Southern^{†}	Legion Field; Birmingham, AL	L 7–13		
November 27	at Spring Hill	Mobile, AL	L 7–14		
*Non-conference game; ^{†}Homecoming
