= 1930 Southwestern Lynx football team =

American college football season

1930 Southwestern Lynx football
- Conference: Southern Intercollegiate Athletic Association
- Record: 6–3 (1–2 SIAA)
- Head coach: Webb Burke (2nd season)
- Home stadium: Fargason Field

1930 Southern Intercollegiate Athletic Association football standings
	Conf.					Overall
Team	W		L		T	W		L		T
Presbyterian $	6	–	0	–	0	9	–	1	–	0
Centre	5	–	0	–	0	7	–	3	–	0
Spring Hill	4	–	0	–	0	6	–	2	–	0
Loyola (LA)	2	–	0	–	0	9	–	1	–	0
Centenary	2	–	0	–	0	8	–	1	–	1
Western Kentucky State Teachers	6	–	1	–	0	8	–	1	–	1
Louisiana Normal	4	–	1	–	0	7	–	2	–	0
Mississippi College	4	–	1	–	0	7	–	2	–	0
The Citadel	3	–	1	–	1	4	–	5	–	2
Kentucky Wesleyan	2	–	1	–	1	2	–	4	–	3
Chattanooga	3	–	2	–	1	5	–	3	–	2
Mercer	3	–	2	–	0	4	–	5	–	0
Millsaps	3	–	3	–	0	6	–	3	–	0
Louisville	2	–	2	–	0	5	–	3	–	0
Birmingham–Southern	3	–	3	–	0	5	–	4	–	0
Stetson	3	–	3	–	0	5	–	3	–	0
Howard (AL)	2	–	3	–	0	5	–	5	–	0
Miami (FL)	2	–	3	–	1	3	–	4	–	1
Southwestern (TN)	1	–	2	–	0	6	–	3	–	0
Erskine	1	–	2	–	1	2	–	5	–	1
Louisiana Tech	2	–	5	–	0	3	–	6	–	0
Georgetown (KY)	1	–	3	–	0	2	–	7	–	0
Wofford	1	–	3	–	0	2	–	9	–	0
Union (TN)	1	–	4	–	0	1	–	5	–	2
Transylvania	1	–	4	–	1	1	–	5	–	2
Louisiana College	1	–	5	–	0	2	–	6	–	0
SW Louisiana	1	–	5	–	0	2	–	8	–	0
Rollins	0	–	0	–	2	2	–	1	–	3
Newberry	0	–	2	–	1	0	–	5	–	3
Southern College	0	–	4	–	1	0	–	6	–	1
Eastern Kentucky	0	–	4	–	0	1	–	7	–	0
$ – Conference champion

The 1930 Southwestern Lynx football team was an American football team that represented Southwestern Presbyterian University (now known as Rhodes College) as a member of the Southern Intercollegiate Athletic Association (SIAA) in the 1930 college football season. Led by Webb Burke in his second season as head coach, the Lynx compiled an overall record of 6–3 and with a mark of 1–2 in conference play.

== Schedule ==
Date	Opponent	Site	Result	Attendance	Source
September 27	at Mississippi A&M*	Scott Field; Starkville, MS	W 14–0		
October 4	Lambuth*	Fargason Field; Memphis, TN	W 50–0	2,500	
October 11	Howard (AL)	Fargason Field; Memphis, TN	L 0–6		
October 17	Northwest Missouri State*	Hodges Field; Memphis, TN	W 24–13	2,000	
October 25	Millsaps	Fargason Field; Memphis, TN	L 7–14		
November 1	Arkansas College*	Fargason Field; Memphis, TN	W 26–0		
November 8	Louisiana College	Fargason Field; Memphis, TN	W 57–0		
November 14	at Ole Miss*	Hemingway Stadium; Oxford, MS	L 6–37		
November 22	Sewanee*	Fargason Field; Memphis, TN	W 26–6	2,500	
*Non-conference game
