= 1930 Millsaps Majors football team =

American college football season

1930 Millsaps Majors football
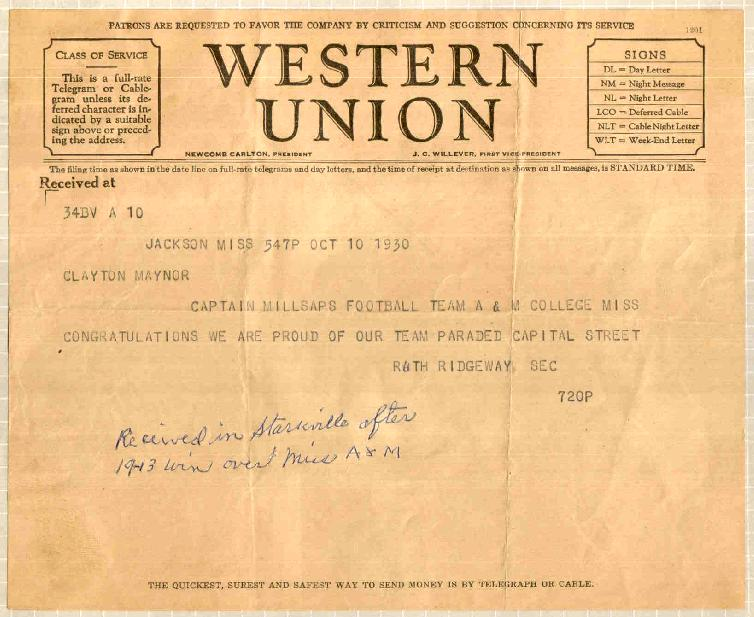
- Conference: Southern Intercollegiate Athletic Association
- Record: 6–3 (3–3 SIAA)
- Head coach: Edwin Hale (3rd season)
- Captain: Clayton Maynor

1930 Southern Intercollegiate Athletic Association football standings
	Conf.					Overall
Team	W		L		T	W		L		T
Presbyterian $	6	–	0	–	0	9	–	1	–	0
Centre	5	–	0	–	0	7	–	3	–	0
Spring Hill	4	–	0	–	0	6	–	2	–	0
Loyola (LA)	2	–	0	–	0	9	–	1	–	0
Centenary	2	–	0	–	0	8	–	1	–	1
Western Kentucky State Teachers	6	–	1	–	0	8	–	1	–	1
Louisiana Normal	4	–	1	–	0	7	–	2	–	0
Mississippi College	4	–	1	–	0	7	–	2	–	0
The Citadel	3	–	1	–	1	4	–	5	–	2
Kentucky Wesleyan	2	–	1	–	1	2	–	4	–	3
Chattanooga	3	–	2	–	1	5	–	3	–	2
Mercer	3	–	2	–	0	4	–	5	–	0
Millsaps	3	–	3	–	0	6	–	3	–	0
Louisville	2	–	2	–	0	5	–	3	–	0
Birmingham–Southern	3	–	3	–	0	5	–	4	–	0
Stetson	3	–	3	–	0	5	–	3	–	0
Howard (AL)	2	–	3	–	0	5	–	5	–	0
Miami (FL)	2	–	3	–	1	3	–	4	–	1
Southwestern (TN)	1	–	2	–	0	6	–	3	–	0
Erskine	1	–	2	–	1	2	–	5	–	1
Louisiana Tech	2	–	5	–	0	3	–	6	–	0
Georgetown (KY)	1	–	3	–	0	2	–	7	–	0
Wofford	1	–	3	–	0	2	–	9	–	0
Union (TN)	1	–	4	–	0	1	–	5	–	2
Transylvania	1	–	4	–	1	1	–	5	–	2
Louisiana College	1	–	5	–	0	2	–	6	–	0
SW Louisiana	1	–	5	–	0	2	–	8	–	0
Rollins	0	–	0	–	2	2	–	1	–	3
Newberry	0	–	2	–	1	0	–	5	–	3
Southern College	0	–	4	–	1	0	–	6	–	1
Eastern Kentucky	0	–	4	–	0	1	–	7	–	0
$ – Conference champion

The 1930 Millsaps Majors football team represented Millsaps College as a member of the Southern Intercollegiate Athletic Association (SIAA) during the 1930 college football season. The team defeated West Tennessee State Teachers, Mississippi A&M, Mississippi State Teachers, and Louisiana Tech. The team was led by head coach Edwin Hale.

== Schedule ==
Date	Opponent	Site	Result	Source
September 27	West Tennessee State Teachers	Alumni Field; Jackson, MS	W 40–0	
October 4	Mississippi State Teachers	Alumni Field; Jackson, MS	W 28–0	
October 10	at Mississippi A&M	Scott Field; Starkville, MS	W 19–13	
October 16	Stetson	Municipal Stadium; Jackson, MS	L 0–13	
October 25	at Southwestern (TN)	Fargason Field; Memphis, TN	W 14–7	
November 1	Union (TN)	Alumni Field; Jackson, MS	W 46–0	
November 8	Birmingham–Southern	Legion Field; Birmingham, AL	L 6–30	
November 15	Louisiana Tech	Jackson, MS	W 19–0	
November 27	Mississippi College	Municipal Stadium; Jackson, MS	L 7–8	
