= 1930 Union (Tennessee) Bulldogs football team =

American college football season

1930 Union (Tennessee) Bulldogs football
- Conference: Southern Intercollegiate Athletic Association
- Record: 1–5–2 (1–4 SIAA)
- Head coach: Roy Stewart (4th season)

1930 Southern Intercollegiate Athletic Association football standings
	Conf.					Overall
Team	W		L		T	W		L		T
Presbyterian $	6	–	0	–	0	9	–	1	–	0
Centre	5	–	0	–	0	7	–	3	–	0
Spring Hill	4	–	0	–	0	6	–	2	–	0
Loyola (LA)	2	–	0	–	0	9	–	1	–	0
Centenary	2	–	0	–	0	8	–	1	–	1
Western Kentucky State Teachers	6	–	1	–	0	8	–	1	–	1
Louisiana Normal	4	–	1	–	0	7	–	2	–	0
Mississippi College	4	–	1	–	0	7	–	2	–	0
The Citadel	3	–	1	–	1	4	–	5	–	2
Kentucky Wesleyan	2	–	1	–	1	2	–	4	–	3
Chattanooga	3	–	2	–	1	5	–	3	–	2
Mercer	3	–	2	–	0	4	–	5	–	0
Millsaps	3	–	3	–	0	6	–	3	–	0
Louisville	2	–	2	–	0	5	–	3	–	0
Birmingham–Southern	3	–	3	–	0	5	–	4	–	0
Stetson	3	–	3	–	0	5	–	3	–	0
Howard (AL)	2	–	3	–	0	5	–	5	–	0
Miami (FL)	2	–	3	–	1	3	–	4	–	1
Southwestern (TN)	1	–	2	–	0	6	–	3	–	0
Erskine	1	–	2	–	1	2	–	5	–	1
Louisiana Tech	2	–	5	–	0	3	–	6	–	0
Georgetown (KY)	1	–	3	–	0	2	–	7	–	0
Wofford	1	–	3	–	0	2	–	9	–	0
Union (TN)	1	–	4	–	0	1	–	5	–	2
Transylvania	1	–	4	–	1	1	–	5	–	2
Louisiana College	1	–	5	–	0	2	–	6	–	0
SW Louisiana	1	–	5	–	0	2	–	8	–	0
Rollins	0	–	0	–	2	2	–	1	–	3
Newberry	0	–	2	–	1	0	–	5	–	3
Southern College	0	–	4	–	1	0	–	6	–	1
Eastern Kentucky	0	–	4	–	0	1	–	7	–	0
$ – Conference champion

The 1930 Union Bulldogs football team was an American football team that represented Union University of Jackson, Tennessee as a member of the Southern Intercollegiate Athletic Association (SIAA) during the 1930 college football season. Led by Roy Stewart in his fourth season as head coach, the Bulldogs compiled an overall record of 1–5–2.

== Schedule ==
Date	Opponent	Site	Result	Source
September 26	at Ole Miss*	Hemingway Stadium; Oxford, MS	L 0–64	
October 4	Bethel (KY)*	Athletic Field; Jackson, TN	T 0–0	
October 10	at Birmingham–Southern	Legion Field; Birmingham, AL	L 0–50	
October 24	at Louisiana Normal	Demon Field; Natchitoches, LA	L 6–14	
November 1	at Millsaps	Alumni Field; Jackson, MS	L 0–46	
November 11	Louisiana College	Athletic Field; Jackson, TN	W 14–7	
November 15	at Spring Hill	Mobile, AL	L 0–35	
November 27	at Mississippi State Teachers*	State Teachers Field; Hattiesburg, MS	T 0–0	
*Non-conference game
