= 1930 Transylvania Pioneers football team =

American college football season

1930 Transylvania Pioneers football
- Conference: Southern Intercollegiate Athletic Association
- Record: 1–5–2 (1–4–1 SIAA)
- Head coach: George E. Pyle (1st season)
- Home stadium: Thomas Field

1930 Southern Intercollegiate Athletic Association football standings
	Conf.					Overall
Team	W		L		T	W		L		T
Presbyterian $	6	–	0	–	0	9	–	1	–	0
Centre	5	–	0	–	0	7	–	3	–	0
Spring Hill	4	–	0	–	0	6	–	2	–	0
Loyola (LA)	2	–	0	–	0	9	–	1	–	0
Centenary	2	–	0	–	0	8	–	1	–	1
Western Kentucky State Teachers	6	–	1	–	0	8	–	1	–	1
Louisiana Normal	4	–	1	–	0	7	–	2	–	0
Mississippi College	4	–	1	–	0	7	–	2	–	0
The Citadel	3	–	1	–	1	4	–	5	–	2
Kentucky Wesleyan	2	–	1	–	1	2	–	4	–	3
Chattanooga	3	–	2	–	1	5	–	3	–	2
Mercer	3	–	2	–	0	4	–	5	–	0
Millsaps	3	–	3	–	0	6	–	3	–	0
Louisville	2	–	2	–	0	5	–	3	–	0
Birmingham–Southern	3	–	3	–	0	5	–	4	–	0
Stetson	3	–	3	–	0	5	–	3	–	0
Howard (AL)	2	–	3	–	0	5	–	5	–	0
Miami (FL)	2	–	3	–	1	3	–	4	–	1
Southwestern (TN)	1	–	2	–	0	6	–	3	–	0
Erskine	1	–	2	–	1	2	–	5	–	1
Louisiana Tech	2	–	5	–	0	3	–	6	–	0
Georgetown (KY)	1	–	3	–	0	2	–	7	–	0
Wofford	1	–	3	–	0	2	–	9	–	0
Union (TN)	1	–	4	–	0	1	–	5	–	2
Transylvania	1	–	4	–	1	1	–	5	–	2
Louisiana College	1	–	5	–	0	2	–	6	–	0
SW Louisiana	1	–	5	–	0	2	–	8	–	0
Rollins	0	–	0	–	2	2	–	1	–	3
Newberry	0	–	2	–	1	0	–	5	–	3
Southern College	0	–	4	–	1	0	–	6	–	1
Eastern Kentucky	0	–	4	–	0	1	–	7	–	0
$ – Conference champion

The 1930 Transylvania Pioneers football team represented Transylvania University as a member the Southern Intercollegiate Athletic Association (SIAA) during the 1930 college football season. Led by first-year head coach George E. Pyle, the Pioneers compiled an overall record of 1–5–2, with a mark of 1–4–1 in conference play.

== Schedule ==
Date	Opponent	Site	Result	Attendance	Source
September 26	at Xavier*	Corcoran Field; Cincinnati, OH	L 0–14	10,000	
October 4	Western Kentucky State Teachers	Thomas Field; Lexington, KY	L 0–19		
October 11	at Louisville	Maxwell Field; Louisville, KY	L 0–18		
October 24	at Georgetown (KY)	Georgetown, KY	L 0–13		
October 31	at Dayton*	UD Stadium; Dayton, OH	T 6–6		
November 8	Eastern Kentucky	Thomas Field; Lexington, KY	W 26–2		
November 15	at Centre	Cheek Field; Danville, KY	L 0–32		
November 27	Kentucky Wesleyan*	Thomas Field; Lexington, KY	T 0–0		
*Non-conference game
