= 1930 Centenary Gentlemen football team =

American college football season

1930 Centenary Gentlemen football
- Conference: Southern Intercollegiate Athletic Association
- Record: 8–1–1 (2–0 SIAA)
- Head coach: Homer Norton (8th season)
- Home stadium: Biedenharn Park; Fairgrounds Stadium

1930 Southern Intercollegiate Athletic Association football standings
	Conf.					Overall
Team	W		L		T	W		L		T
Presbyterian $	6	–	0	–	0	9	–	1	–	0
Centre	5	–	0	–	0	7	–	3	–	0
Spring Hill	4	–	0	–	0	6	–	2	–	0
Loyola (LA)	2	–	0	–	0	9	–	1	–	0
Centenary	2	–	0	–	0	8	–	1	–	1
Western Kentucky State Teachers	6	–	1	–	0	8	–	1	–	1
Louisiana Normal	4	–	1	–	0	7	–	2	–	0
Mississippi College	4	–	1	–	0	7	–	2	–	0
The Citadel	3	–	1	–	1	4	–	5	–	2
Kentucky Wesleyan	2	–	1	–	1	2	–	4	–	3
Chattanooga	3	–	2	–	1	5	–	3	–	2
Mercer	3	–	2	–	0	4	–	5	–	0
Millsaps	3	–	3	–	0	6	–	3	–	0
Louisville	2	–	2	–	0	5	–	3	–	0
Birmingham–Southern	3	–	3	–	0	5	–	4	–	0
Stetson	3	–	3	–	0	5	–	3	–	0
Howard (AL)	2	–	3	–	0	5	–	5	–	0
Miami (FL)	2	–	3	–	1	3	–	4	–	1
Southwestern (TN)	1	–	2	–	0	6	–	3	–	0
Erskine	1	–	2	–	1	2	–	5	–	1
Louisiana Tech	2	–	5	–	0	3	–	6	–	0
Georgetown (KY)	1	–	3	–	0	2	–	7	–	0
Wofford	1	–	3	–	0	2	–	9	–	0
Union (TN)	1	–	4	–	0	1	–	5	–	2
Transylvania	1	–	4	–	1	1	–	5	–	2
Louisiana College	1	–	5	–	0	2	–	6	–	0
SW Louisiana	1	–	5	–	0	2	–	8	–	0
Rollins	0	–	0	–	2	2	–	1	–	3
Newberry	0	–	2	–	1	0	–	5	–	3
Southern College	0	–	4	–	1	0	–	6	–	1
Eastern Kentucky	0	–	4	–	0	1	–	7	–	0
$ – Conference champion

The 1930 Centenary Gentlemen football team was an American football team that represented the Centenary College of Louisiana as a member of the Southern Intercollegiate Athletic Association (SIAA) during the 1930 college football season. In their eighth year under head coach Homer Norton, the team compiled an 8–1–1 record.

== Schedule ==
Date	Opponent	Site	Result	Attendance	Source
September 26	Hendrix-Henderson*	Biedenharn Park; Shreveport, LA	W 27–0	4,000	
October 4	at Texas*	War Memorial Stadium; Austin, TX	T 0–0		
October 11	at Iowa*	Iowa Stadium; Iowa City, IA	W 19–12		
October 20	Stetson	Biedenharn Park; Shreveport, LA	W 9–0	3,500	
October 25	Baylor*	Fairgrounds Stadium; Shreveport, LA	W 7–2	8,000	
November 1	at Texas A&M*	Kyle Field; College Station, TX	L 6–7		
November 11	Central State Teachers*	Fairgrounds Stadium; Shreveport, LA	W 19–0	3,000	
November 15	Henderson State*	Fairgrounds Stadium; Shreveport, LA	W 20–6	2,000	
November 22	at Louisiana Tech	Tech Stadium; Ruston, LA	W 13–0		
November 27	Arkansas*	Fairgrounds Stadium; Shreveport, LA	W 7–6	5,000	
*Non-conference game
