= 1930 The Citadel Bulldogs football team =

American college football season

1930 The Citadel Bulldogs football
- Conference: Southern Intercollegiate Athletic Association
- Record: 4–5–2 (3–1–1 SIAA)
- Head coach: Johnny Floyd (1st season)
- Home stadium: Johnson Hagood Stadium

1930 Southern Intercollegiate Athletic Association football standings
	Conf.					Overall
Team	W		L		T	W		L		T
Presbyterian $	6	–	0	–	0	9	–	1	–	0
Centre	5	–	0	–	0	7	–	3	–	0
Spring Hill	4	–	0	–	0	6	–	2	–	0
Loyola (LA)	2	–	0	–	0	9	–	1	–	0
Centenary	2	–	0	–	0	8	–	1	–	1
Western Kentucky State Teachers	6	–	1	–	0	8	–	1	–	1
Louisiana Normal	4	–	1	–	0	7	–	2	–	0
Mississippi College	4	–	1	–	0	7	–	2	–	0
The Citadel	3	–	1	–	1	4	–	5	–	2
Kentucky Wesleyan	2	–	1	–	1	2	–	4	–	3
Chattanooga	3	–	2	–	1	5	–	3	–	2
Mercer	3	–	2	–	0	4	–	5	–	0
Millsaps	3	–	3	–	0	6	–	3	–	0
Louisville	2	–	2	–	0	5	–	3	–	0
Birmingham–Southern	3	–	3	–	0	5	–	4	–	0
Stetson	3	–	3	–	0	5	–	3	–	0
Howard (AL)	2	–	3	–	0	5	–	5	–	0
Miami (FL)	2	–	3	–	1	3	–	4	–	1
Southwestern (TN)	1	–	2	–	0	6	–	3	–	0
Erskine	1	–	2	–	1	2	–	5	–	1
Louisiana Tech	2	–	5	–	0	3	–	6	–	0
Georgetown (KY)	1	–	3	–	0	2	–	7	–	0
Wofford	1	–	3	–	0	2	–	9	–	0
Union (TN)	1	–	4	–	0	1	–	5	–	2
Transylvania	1	–	4	–	1	1	–	5	–	2
Louisiana College	1	–	5	–	0	2	–	6	–	0
SW Louisiana	1	–	5	–	0	2	–	8	–	0
Rollins	0	–	0	–	2	2	–	1	–	3
Newberry	0	–	2	–	1	0	–	5	–	3
Southern College	0	–	4	–	1	0	–	6	–	1
Eastern Kentucky	0	–	4	–	0	1	–	7	–	0
$ – Conference champion

The 1930 The Citadel Bulldogs football team represented The Citadel, The Military College of South Carolina in the 1930 college football season. Johnny Floyd served as head coach for the first season. The Bulldogs played as members of the Southern Intercollegiate Athletic Association (SIAA) and played home games at Johnson Hagood Stadium.

== Schedule ==
Date	Opponent	Site	Result	Source
September 20	Stetson	Johnson Hagood Stadium; Charleston, SC	W 13–7	
September 27	Erskine	Johnson Hagood Stadium; Charleston, SC	W 13–0	
October 3	vs. Clemson*	Florence Memorial Stadium; Florence, SC	L 7–13	
October 11	VMI*	Johnson Hagood Stadium; Charleston, SC (rivalry)	W 7–6	
October 18	vs. Davidson*	Central High School Stadium; Charlotte, NC	L 0–6	
October 25	Presbyterian	Johnson Hagood Stadium; Charleston, SC	L 0–6	
October 30	vs. South Carolina*	County Fairgrounds; Orangeburg, SC	L 0–13	
November 11	vs. Quantico Marines*	Maher Field; Roanoke, VA	T 0–0	
November 15	Chattanooga	Johnson Hagood Stadium; Charleston, SC	T 7–7	
November 22	at Furman*	Manly Field; Greenville, SC (rivalry)	L 6–31	
November 29	at Wofford	Snyder Field; Spartanburg, SC (rivalry)	W 7–6	
*Non-conference game
