= 1930 Chattanooga Moccasins football team =

American college football season

1930 Chattanooga Moccasins football
- Conference: Southern Intercollegiate Athletic Association
- Record: 5–3–2 (3–2–1 SIAA)
- Head coach: Harold Drew (2nd season)
- Captains: Irv Gross; Bowden Findley
- Home stadium: Chamberlain Field

1930 Southern Intercollegiate Athletic Association football standings
	Conf.					Overall
Team	W		L		T	W		L		T
Presbyterian $	6	–	0	–	0	9	–	1	–	0
Centre	5	–	0	–	0	7	–	3	–	0
Spring Hill	4	–	0	–	0	6	–	2	–	0
Loyola (LA)	2	–	0	–	0	9	–	1	–	0
Centenary	2	–	0	–	0	8	–	1	–	1
Western Kentucky State Teachers	6	–	1	–	0	8	–	1	–	1
Louisiana Normal	4	–	1	–	0	7	–	2	–	0
Mississippi College	4	–	1	–	0	7	–	2	–	0
The Citadel	3	–	1	–	1	4	–	5	–	2
Kentucky Wesleyan	2	–	1	–	1	2	–	4	–	3
Chattanooga	3	–	2	–	1	5	–	3	–	2
Mercer	3	–	2	–	0	4	–	5	–	0
Millsaps	3	–	3	–	0	6	–	3	–	0
Louisville	2	–	2	–	0	5	–	3	–	0
Birmingham–Southern	3	–	3	–	0	5	–	4	–	0
Stetson	3	–	3	–	0	5	–	3	–	0
Howard (AL)	2	–	3	–	0	5	–	5	–	0
Miami (FL)	2	–	3	–	1	3	–	4	–	1
Southwestern (TN)	1	–	2	–	0	6	–	3	–	0
Erskine	1	–	2	–	1	2	–	5	–	1
Louisiana Tech	2	–	5	–	0	3	–	6	–	0
Georgetown (KY)	1	–	3	–	0	2	–	7	–	0
Wofford	1	–	3	–	0	2	–	9	–	0
Union (TN)	1	–	4	–	0	1	–	5	–	2
Transylvania	1	–	4	–	1	1	–	5	–	2
Louisiana College	1	–	5	–	0	2	–	6	–	0
SW Louisiana	1	–	5	–	0	2	–	8	–	0
Rollins	0	–	0	–	2	2	–	1	–	3
Newberry	0	–	2	–	1	0	–	5	–	3
Southern College	0	–	4	–	1	0	–	6	–	1
Eastern Kentucky	0	–	4	–	0	1	–	7	–	0
$ – Conference champion

The 1930 Chattanooga Moccasins football team represented the University of Chattanooga as a member of the Southern Intercollegiate Athletic Association (SIAA) during the 1930 college football season. Led by second-year head coach Harold Drew, the Moccasins compiled and overall record of 5–3–2 with a mark of 3–2–1 in SIAA play.

== Schedule ==
Date	Opponent	Site	Result	Attendance	Source
September 20	Middle Tennessee State Teachers*	Chamberlain Field; Chattanooga, TN	W 25–0		
September 27	at Vanderbilt*	Dudley Field; Nashville, TN	L 0–39		
October 4	Presbyterian	Chamberlain Field; Chattanooga, TN	L 6–7		
October 11	Centre	Chamberlain Field; Chattanooga, TN	L 6–7		
October 18	at Mercer	Centennial Stadium; Macon, GA	W 8–6		
October 25	Mississippi College	Chamberlain Field; Chattanooga, TN	W 24–7		
November 1	Howard (AL)	Chamberlain Field; Chattanooga, TN	W 13–9	10,000	
November 8	Sewanee*	Chamberlain Field; Chattanooga, TN	T 0–0		
November 15	at The Citadel	Johnson Hagood Stadium; Charleston, SC	T 7–7		
November 27	Oglethorpe*	Chamberlain Field; Chattanooga, TN	W 20–6	4,000	
*Non-conference game
