= 1930 Western Kentucky State Teachers Hilltoppers football team =

American college football season

1930 Western Kentucky State Teachers Hilltoppers football
- Conference: Southern Intercollegiate Athletic Association
- Record: 8–1–1 (6–1 SIAA)
- Head coach: James Elam (1st season)
- Captain: Paul "Burrhead" Vaughn

1930 Southern Intercollegiate Athletic Association football standings
	Conf.					Overall
Team	W		L		T	W		L		T
Presbyterian $	6	–	0	–	0	9	–	1	–	0
Centre	5	–	0	–	0	7	–	3	–	0
Spring Hill	4	–	0	–	0	6	–	2	–	0
Loyola (LA)	2	–	0	–	0	9	–	1	–	0
Centenary	2	–	0	–	0	8	–	1	–	1
Western Kentucky State Teachers	6	–	1	–	0	8	–	1	–	1
Louisiana Normal	4	–	1	–	0	7	–	2	–	0
Mississippi College	4	–	1	–	0	7	–	2	–	0
The Citadel	3	–	1	–	1	4	–	5	–	2
Kentucky Wesleyan	2	–	1	–	1	2	–	4	–	3
Chattanooga	3	–	2	–	1	5	–	3	–	2
Mercer	3	–	2	–	0	4	–	5	–	0
Millsaps	3	–	3	–	0	6	–	3	–	0
Louisville	2	–	2	–	0	5	–	3	–	0
Birmingham–Southern	3	–	3	–	0	5	–	4	–	0
Stetson	3	–	3	–	0	5	–	3	–	0
Howard (AL)	2	–	3	–	0	5	–	5	–	0
Miami (FL)	2	–	3	–	1	3	–	4	–	1
Southwestern (TN)	1	–	2	–	0	6	–	3	–	0
Erskine	1	–	2	–	1	2	–	5	–	1
Louisiana Tech	2	–	5	–	0	3	–	6	–	0
Georgetown (KY)	1	–	3	–	0	2	–	7	–	0
Wofford	1	–	3	–	0	2	–	9	–	0
Union (TN)	1	–	4	–	0	1	–	5	–	2
Transylvania	1	–	4	–	1	1	–	5	–	2
Louisiana College	1	–	5	–	0	2	–	6	–	0
SW Louisiana	1	–	5	–	0	2	–	8	–	0
Rollins	0	–	0	–	2	2	–	1	–	3
Newberry	0	–	2	–	1	0	–	5	–	3
Southern College	0	–	4	–	1	0	–	6	–	1
Eastern Kentucky	0	–	4	–	0	1	–	7	–	0
$ – Conference champion

The 1930 Western Kentucky State Teachers Hilltoppers football team represented Western Kentucky State Teachers College (now known as Western Kentucky University) in the 1930 college football season. They were led by first-year coach James Elam and team captain Paul "Burrhead" Vaughn. One of the highlights for this team was a victorious season ending trip to Miami. Rupert Cummings and Leroy Elrod were named to the All Kentucky Team.

== Schedule ==
Date	Opponent	Site	Result	Source
September 27	at Centre	Cheek Field; Danville, KY	L 0–31	
October 4	at Transylvania	Thomas Field; Lexington, KY	W 19–0	
October 11	Bethel (KY)	Bowling Green, KY	W 31–0	
October 18	Middle Tennessee State Teachers	Bowling Green, KY (rivalry)	W 13–7	
October 25	Louisville^{†}	Bowling Green, KY	W 7–6	
November 1	Kentucky Wesleyan	Bowling Green, KY	W 25–14	
November 15	Georgetown (KY)	Bowling Green, KY	W 20–0	
November 22	at Eastern Kentucky	Richmond, KY (rivalry)	W 50–0	
November 27	Western State Teachers	Bowling Green, KY	T 0–0	
December 6	at Miami (FL)	Moore Park; Miami, FL	W 19–0	
^{†}Homecoming
