= 1930 Loyola Wolf Pack football team =

American college football season

1930 Loyola Wolf Pack football
- Conference: Southern Intercollegiate Athletic Association
- Record: 9–1 (2–0 SIAA)
- Head coach: Clark Shaughnessy (4th season)
- Home stadium: Loyola University Stadium

1930 Southern Intercollegiate Athletic Association football standings
	Conf.					Overall
Team	W		L		T	W		L		T
Presbyterian $	6	–	0	–	0	9	–	1	–	0
Centre	5	–	0	–	0	7	–	3	–	0
Spring Hill	4	–	0	–	0	6	–	2	–	0
Loyola (LA)	2	–	0	–	0	9	–	1	–	0
Centenary	2	–	0	–	0	8	–	1	–	1
Western Kentucky State Teachers	6	–	1	–	0	8	–	1	–	1
Louisiana Normal	4	–	1	–	0	7	–	2	–	0
Mississippi College	4	–	1	–	0	7	–	2	–	0
The Citadel	3	–	1	–	1	4	–	5	–	2
Kentucky Wesleyan	2	–	1	–	1	2	–	4	–	3
Chattanooga	3	–	2	–	1	5	–	3	–	2
Mercer	3	–	2	–	0	4	–	5	–	0
Millsaps	3	–	3	–	0	6	–	3	–	0
Louisville	2	–	2	–	0	5	–	3	–	0
Birmingham–Southern	3	–	3	–	0	5	–	4	–	0
Stetson	3	–	3	–	0	5	–	3	–	0
Howard (AL)	2	–	3	–	0	5	–	5	–	0
Miami (FL)	2	–	3	–	1	3	–	4	–	1
Southwestern (TN)	1	–	2	–	0	6	–	3	–	0
Erskine	1	–	2	–	1	2	–	5	–	1
Louisiana Tech	2	–	5	–	0	3	–	6	–	0
Georgetown (KY)	1	–	3	–	0	2	–	7	–	0
Wofford	1	–	3	–	0	2	–	9	–	0
Union (TN)	1	–	4	–	0	1	–	5	–	2
Transylvania	1	–	4	–	1	1	–	5	–	2
Louisiana College	1	–	5	–	0	2	–	6	–	0
SW Louisiana	1	–	5	–	0	2	–	8	–	0
Rollins	0	–	0	–	2	2	–	1	–	3
Newberry	0	–	2	–	1	0	–	5	–	3
Southern College	0	–	4	–	1	0	–	6	–	1
Eastern Kentucky	0	–	4	–	0	1	–	7	–	0
$ – Conference champion

The 1930 Loyola Wolf Pack football team was an American football team that represented Loyola College of New Orleans (now known as Loyola University New Orleans) as a member of the Southern Intercollegiate Athletic Association (SIAA) during the 1930 college football season. In its fourth season under head coach Clark Shaughnessy, the team compiled a 9–1 record and outscored opponents by a total of 217 to 52. The team played its home games at Loyola University Stadium in New Orleans.

== Schedule ==
Date	Opponent	Site	Result	Attendance	Source
September 26	Louisiana Normal	Loyola Stadium; New Orleans LA	W 31–7		
October 4	Louisiana Tech	Loyola Stadium; New Orleans, LA	W 26–0		
October 11	Daniel Baker*	Loyola Stadium; New Orleans, LA	W 39–0		
October 17	Loyola (IL)*	Loyola Stadium; New Orleans, LA	W 25–0		
October 25	Oglethorpe*	Loyola Stadium; New Orleans, LA	L 0–19		
October 31	at Xavier*	Corcoran Field; Cincinnati, OH	W 27–6	6,000	
November 7	Butler*	Loyola Stadium; New Orleans, LA	W 33–0	8,000	
November 14	at Saint Louis*	Edward J. Walsh Memorial Stadium; St. Louis, MO	W 14–7	6,000	
November 29	Iowa State	Loyola Stadium; New Orleans, LA	W 14–7	8,000	
December 4	Detroit*	Loyola Stadium; New Orleans, LA	W 9–6		
*Non-conference game
