= 1930 Spring Hill Badgers football team =

American college football season

1930 Spring Hill Badgers football
- Conference: Southern Intercollegiate Athletic Association
- Record: 6–2 (4–0 SIAA)
- Head coach: William T. Daly (6th season)

1930 Southern Intercollegiate Athletic Association football standings
	Conf.					Overall
Team	W		L		T	W		L		T
Presbyterian $	6	–	0	–	0	9	–	1	–	0
Centre	5	–	0	–	0	7	–	3	–	0
Spring Hill	4	–	0	–	0	6	–	2	–	0
Loyola (LA)	2	–	0	–	0	9	–	1	–	0
Centenary	2	–	0	–	0	8	–	1	–	1
Western Kentucky State Teachers	6	–	1	–	0	8	–	1	–	1
Louisiana Normal	4	–	1	–	0	7	–	2	–	0
Mississippi College	4	–	1	–	0	7	–	2	–	0
The Citadel	3	–	1	–	1	4	–	5	–	2
Kentucky Wesleyan	2	–	1	–	1	2	–	4	–	3
Chattanooga	3	–	2	–	1	5	–	3	–	2
Mercer	3	–	2	–	0	4	–	5	–	0
Millsaps	3	–	3	–	0	6	–	3	–	0
Louisville	2	–	2	–	0	5	–	3	–	0
Birmingham–Southern	3	–	3	–	0	5	–	4	–	0
Stetson	3	–	3	–	0	5	–	3	–	0
Howard (AL)	2	–	3	–	0	5	–	5	–	0
Miami (FL)	2	–	3	–	1	3	–	4	–	1
Southwestern (TN)	1	–	2	–	0	6	–	3	–	0
Erskine	1	–	2	–	1	2	–	5	–	1
Louisiana Tech	2	–	5	–	0	3	–	6	–	0
Georgetown (KY)	1	–	3	–	0	2	–	7	–	0
Wofford	1	–	3	–	0	2	–	9	–	0
Union (TN)	1	–	4	–	0	1	–	5	–	2
Transylvania	1	–	4	–	1	1	–	5	–	2
Louisiana College	1	–	5	–	0	2	–	6	–	0
SW Louisiana	1	–	5	–	0	2	–	8	–	0
Rollins	0	–	0	–	2	2	–	1	–	3
Newberry	0	–	2	–	1	0	–	5	–	3
Southern College	0	–	4	–	1	0	–	6	–	1
Eastern Kentucky	0	–	4	–	0	1	–	7	–	0
$ – Conference champion

The 1930 Spring Hill Badgers football team was an American football team that represented Spring Hill College, a Jesuit college in Mobile, Alabama, as member of the Southern Intercollegiate Athletic Association (SIAA) during the 1930 college football season. In its sixth season under head coach William T. Daly, the team compiled an overall record of 6–2 with a mark of 4–0 in SIAA play.

== Schedule ==
Date	Opponent	Site	Result	Source
September 27	Marion*	Mobile, AL	W 70–0	
October 4	at Auburn*	Drake Field; Auburn, AL	L 0–13	
October 18	at Vanderbilt*	Dudley Field; Nashville, TN	L 6–27	
October 25	Birmingham–Southern	Mobile, AL	W 7–6	
November 1	at Mississippi State Teachers*	State Teachers Field; Hattiesburg, MS	W 7–6	
November 8	Southwestern Louisiana	Mobile, AL	W 20–6	
November 15	Union (TN)	Mobile, AL	W 35–0	
November 27	Howard (AL)	Mobile, AL	W 14–7	
*Non-conference game
