= 1930 Birmingham–Southern Panthers football team =

American college football season

1930 Birmingham–Southern Panthers football
- Conference: Southern Intercollegiate Athletic Association
- Record: 5–4 (3–3 SIAA)
- Head coach: Jenks Gillem (3rd season)
- Home stadium: Legion Field

1930 Southern Intercollegiate Athletic Association football standings
	Conf.					Overall
Team	W		L		T	W		L		T
Presbyterian $	6	–	0	–	0	9	–	1	–	0
Centre	5	–	0	–	0	7	–	3	–	0
Spring Hill	4	–	0	–	0	6	–	2	–	0
Loyola (LA)	2	–	0	–	0	9	–	1	–	0
Centenary	2	–	0	–	0	8	–	1	–	1
Western Kentucky State Teachers	6	–	1	–	0	8	–	1	–	1
Louisiana Normal	4	–	1	–	0	7	–	2	–	0
Mississippi College	4	–	1	–	0	7	–	2	–	0
The Citadel	3	–	1	–	1	4	–	5	–	2
Kentucky Wesleyan	2	–	1	–	1	2	–	4	–	3
Chattanooga	3	–	2	–	1	5	–	3	–	2
Mercer	3	–	2	–	0	4	–	5	–	0
Millsaps	3	–	3	–	0	6	–	3	–	0
Louisville	2	–	2	–	0	5	–	3	–	0
Birmingham–Southern	3	–	3	–	0	5	–	4	–	0
Stetson	3	–	3	–	0	5	–	3	–	0
Howard (AL)	2	–	3	–	0	5	–	5	–	0
Miami (FL)	2	–	3	–	1	3	–	4	–	1
Southwestern (TN)	1	–	2	–	0	6	–	3	–	0
Erskine	1	–	2	–	1	2	–	5	–	1
Louisiana Tech	2	–	5	–	0	3	–	6	–	0
Georgetown (KY)	1	–	3	–	0	2	–	7	–	0
Wofford	1	–	3	–	0	2	–	9	–	0
Union (TN)	1	–	4	–	0	1	–	5	–	2
Transylvania	1	–	4	–	1	1	–	5	–	2
Louisiana College	1	–	5	–	0	2	–	6	–	0
SW Louisiana	1	–	5	–	0	2	–	8	–	0
Rollins	0	–	0	–	2	2	–	1	–	3
Newberry	0	–	2	–	1	0	–	5	–	3
Southern College	0	–	4	–	1	0	–	6	–	1
Eastern Kentucky	0	–	4	–	0	1	–	7	–	0
$ – Conference champion

The 1930 Birmingham–Southern Panthers football team was an American football team that represented Birmingham–Southern College as a member of the Southern Intercollegiate Athletic Association (SIAA) during the 1930 college football season. In their third season under head coach Jenks Gillem, the team compiled a 5–4 record.

== Schedule ==
Date	Opponent	Site	Result	Attendance	Source
September 26	at Auburn*	Cramton Bowl; Montgomery, AL	W 7–0	9,000	
October 4	Marion*	Legion Field; Birmingham, AL	W 49–0		
October 10	Union (TN)	Legion Field; Birmingham, AL	W 50–0		
October 18	at Tulane*	Tulane Stadium; New Orleans, LA	L 0–21	12,000	
October 25	at Spring Hill	Mobile, AL	L 6–7		
November 1	at Mercer	Centennial Stadium; Macon, GA	L 6–13		
November 8	Millsaps	Legion Field; Birmingham, AL	W 30–6		
November 15	at Mississippi College	Provine Field; Clinton, MS	L 0–6		
November 23	vs. Howard (AL)	Legion Field; Birmingham, AL	W 13–7		
*Non-conference game
