= 1930 Southwestern Louisiana Bulldogs football team =

American college football season

1930 Southwestern Louisiana Bulldogs football
- Conference: Southern Intercollegiate Athletic Association
- Record: 2–8 (1–5 SIAA)
- Head coach: T. R. Mobley (12th season)
- Home stadium: Campus Athletic Field

1930 Southern Intercollegiate Athletic Association football standings
	Conf.					Overall
Team	W		L		T	W		L		T
Presbyterian $	6	–	0	–	0	9	–	1	–	0
Centre	5	–	0	–	0	7	–	3	–	0
Spring Hill	4	–	0	–	0	6	–	2	–	0
Loyola (LA)	2	–	0	–	0	9	–	1	–	0
Centenary	2	–	0	–	0	8	–	1	–	1
Western Kentucky State Teachers	6	–	1	–	0	8	–	1	–	1
Louisiana Normal	4	–	1	–	0	7	–	2	–	0
Mississippi College	4	–	1	–	0	7	–	2	–	0
The Citadel	3	–	1	–	1	4	–	5	–	2
Kentucky Wesleyan	2	–	1	–	1	2	–	4	–	3
Chattanooga	3	–	2	–	1	5	–	3	–	2
Mercer	3	–	2	–	0	4	–	5	–	0
Millsaps	3	–	3	–	0	6	–	3	–	0
Louisville	2	–	2	–	0	5	–	3	–	0
Birmingham–Southern	3	–	3	–	0	5	–	4	–	0
Stetson	3	–	3	–	0	5	–	3	–	0
Howard (AL)	2	–	3	–	0	5	–	5	–	0
Miami (FL)	2	–	3	–	1	3	–	4	–	1
Southwestern (TN)	1	–	2	–	0	6	–	3	–	0
Erskine	1	–	2	–	1	2	–	5	–	1
Louisiana Tech	2	–	5	–	0	3	–	6	–	0
Georgetown (KY)	1	–	3	–	0	2	–	7	–	0
Wofford	1	–	3	–	0	2	–	9	–	0
Union (TN)	1	–	4	–	0	1	–	5	–	2
Transylvania	1	–	4	–	1	1	–	5	–	2
Louisiana College	1	–	5	–	0	2	–	6	–	0
SW Louisiana	1	–	5	–	0	2	–	8	–	0
Rollins	0	–	0	–	2	2	–	1	–	3
Newberry	0	–	2	–	1	0	–	5	–	3
Southern College	0	–	4	–	1	0	–	6	–	1
Eastern Kentucky	0	–	4	–	0	1	–	7	–	0
$ – Conference champion

The 1930 Southwestern Louisiana Bulldogs football team was an American football team that represented the Southwestern Louisiana Institute of Liberal and Technical Learning (now known as the University of Louisiana at Lafayette) in the Southern Intercollegiate Athletic Association during the 1930 college football season. In their twelfth year under head coach T. R. Mobley, the team compiled a 2–8 record.

== Schedule ==
Date	Opponent	Site	Result	Attendance	Source
September 27	at Tulane*	Tulane Stadium; New Orleans, LA	L 0–84	10,000	
October 4	at LSU*	Tiger Stadium; Baton Rouge, LA	L 0–85		
October 11	Marshall (TX)*	Campus Athletic Field; Lafayette, LA	L 0–19		
October 18	Mississippi State Teachers*	Campus Athletic Field; Lafayette, LA	W 14–0		
October 25	Louisiana Tech	Campus Athletic Field; Lafayette, LA (rivalry)	L 0–7		
November 1	at Louisiana College	Alumni Field; Pineville, LA	L 13–18		
November 8	at Spring Hill	Mobile, AL	L 6–20		
November 11	at Southern College	Winter Haven, FL	W 13–0		
November 14	at Miami (FL)	Moore Park; Miami, FL	L 0–6		
November 27	Louisiana Normal	Campus Athletic Field; Lafayette, LA	L 6–18		
*Non-conference game
