= 1930 Miami Hurricanes football team =

American college football season

1930 Miami Hurricanes football
- Conference: Southern Intercollegiate Athletic Association
- Record: 3–4–1 (2–3–1 SIAA)
- Head coach: Ernest E. Brett (1st season)
- Home stadium: Moore Park

1930 Southern Intercollegiate Athletic Association football standings
	Conf.					Overall
Team	W		L		T	W		L		T
Presbyterian $	6	–	0	–	0	9	–	1	–	0
Centre	5	–	0	–	0	7	–	3	–	0
Spring Hill	4	–	0	–	0	6	–	2	–	0
Loyola (LA)	2	–	0	–	0	9	–	1	–	0
Centenary	2	–	0	–	0	8	–	1	–	1
Western Kentucky State Teachers	6	–	1	–	0	8	–	1	–	1
Louisiana Normal	4	–	1	–	0	7	–	2	–	0
Mississippi College	4	–	1	–	0	7	–	2	–	0
The Citadel	3	–	1	–	1	4	–	5	–	2
Kentucky Wesleyan	2	–	1	–	1	2	–	4	–	3
Chattanooga	3	–	2	–	1	5	–	3	–	2
Mercer	3	–	2	–	0	4	–	5	–	0
Millsaps	3	–	3	–	0	6	–	3	–	0
Louisville	2	–	2	–	0	5	–	3	–	0
Birmingham–Southern	3	–	3	–	0	5	–	4	–	0
Stetson	3	–	3	–	0	5	–	3	–	0
Howard (AL)	2	–	3	–	0	5	–	5	–	0
Miami (FL)	2	–	3	–	1	3	–	4	–	1
Southwestern (TN)	1	–	2	–	0	6	–	3	–	0
Erskine	1	–	2	–	1	2	–	5	–	1
Louisiana Tech	2	–	5	–	0	3	–	6	–	0
Georgetown (KY)	1	–	3	–	0	2	–	7	–	0
Wofford	1	–	3	–	0	2	–	9	–	0
Union (TN)	1	–	4	–	0	1	–	5	–	2
Transylvania	1	–	4	–	1	1	–	5	–	2
Louisiana College	1	–	5	–	0	2	–	6	–	0
SW Louisiana	1	–	5	–	0	2	–	8	–	0
Rollins	0	–	0	–	2	2	–	1	–	3
Newberry	0	–	2	–	1	0	–	5	–	3
Southern College	0	–	4	–	1	0	–	6	–	1
Eastern Kentucky	0	–	4	–	0	1	–	7	–	0
$ – Conference champion

The 1930 Miami Hurricanes football team represented the University of Miami as a member of Southern Intercollegiate Athletic Association (SIAA) in the 1930 college football season. The Hurricanes played their home games at Moore Park in Miami, Florida. The team was coached by Ernest E. Brett, in his first and only year as head coach for the Hurricanes.

== Schedule ==
Date	Opponent	Site	Result	Attendance	Source
October 25	Southern College	Moore Park; Miami, FL	W 13–6	2,500	
October 31	Bowdon College*	Moore Park; Miami, FL	W 7–0	4,000	
November 8	vs. Temple*	Atlantic City Convention Hall; Atlantic City, NJ	L 0–34	16,000	
November 11	vs. Howard (AL)	Wiregrass Stadium; Dothan, AL	L 0–24	3,000	
November 14	Southwestern Louisiana	Moore Park; Miami, FL	W 6–0		
November 21	Rollins	Moore Park; Miami, FL	T 0–0		
November 29	Stetson	Moore Park; Miami, FL	L 0–19		
December 5	Western Kentucky State Teachers	Moore Park; Miami, FL	L 0–19		
*Non-conference game
