= 1930 Louisiana Tech Bulldogs football team =

American college football season

1930 Louisiana Tech Bulldogs football
- Conference: Southern Intercollegiate Athletic Association
- Record: 3–6 (2–5 SIAA)
- Head coach: George Bohler (1st season)
- Captain: George Riser
- Home stadium: Tech Stadium

1930 Southern Intercollegiate Athletic Association football standings
	Conf.					Overall
Team	W		L		T	W		L		T
Presbyterian $	6	–	0	–	0	9	–	1	–	0
Centre	5	–	0	–	0	7	–	3	–	0
Spring Hill	4	–	0	–	0	6	–	2	–	0
Loyola (LA)	2	–	0	–	0	9	–	1	–	0
Centenary	2	–	0	–	0	8	–	1	–	1
Western Kentucky State Teachers	6	–	1	–	0	8	–	1	–	1
Louisiana Normal	4	–	1	–	0	7	–	2	–	0
Mississippi College	4	–	1	–	0	7	–	2	–	0
The Citadel	3	–	1	–	1	4	–	5	–	2
Kentucky Wesleyan	2	–	1	–	1	2	–	4	–	3
Chattanooga	3	–	2	–	1	5	–	3	–	2
Mercer	3	–	2	–	0	4	–	5	–	0
Millsaps	3	–	3	–	0	6	–	3	–	0
Louisville	2	–	2	–	0	5	–	3	–	0
Birmingham–Southern	3	–	3	–	0	5	–	4	–	0
Stetson	3	–	3	–	0	5	–	3	–	0
Howard (AL)	2	–	3	–	0	5	–	5	–	0
Miami (FL)	2	–	3	–	1	3	–	4	–	1
Southwestern (TN)	1	–	2	–	0	6	–	3	–	0
Erskine	1	–	2	–	1	2	–	5	–	1
Louisiana Tech	2	–	5	–	0	3	–	6	–	0
Georgetown (KY)	1	–	3	–	0	2	–	7	–	0
Wofford	1	–	3	–	0	2	–	9	–	0
Union (TN)	1	–	4	–	0	1	–	5	–	2
Transylvania	1	–	4	–	1	1	–	5	–	2
Louisiana College	1	–	5	–	0	2	–	6	–	0
SW Louisiana	1	–	5	–	0	2	–	8	–	0
Rollins	0	–	0	–	2	2	–	1	–	3
Newberry	0	–	2	–	1	0	–	5	–	3
Southern College	0	–	4	–	1	0	–	6	–	1
Eastern Kentucky	0	–	4	–	0	1	–	7	–	0
$ – Conference champion

The 1930 Louisiana Tech Bulldogs football team was an American football team that represented the Louisiana Polytechnic Institute (now known as Louisiana Tech University) as a member of the Southern Intercollegiate Athletic Association (SIAA) during the 1930 college football season. In their first year under head coach George Bohler, the team compiled a 3–6 record.

== Schedule ==
Date	Opponent	Site	Result	Source
September 27	at LSU*	Tiger Stadium; Baton Rouge, LA	L 0–71	
October 4	at Loyola (LA)	Loyola University Stadium; New Orleans, LA	L 0–26	
October 11	Magnolia A&M*	Tech Stadium; Ruston, LA	W 12–0	
October 17	at Mississippi College	Municipal Stadium; Jackson, MS	L 0–39	
October 25	at Southwestern Louisiana	Campus Athletic Field; Lafayette, LA (rivalry)	W 7–0	
October 31	at Louisiana Normal	Demon Field; Natchitoches, LA (rivalry)	L 14–19	
November 15	at Millsaps	Municipal Stadium; Jackson, MS	L 0–19	
November 22	Centenary^{†}	Tech Stadium; Ruston, LA	L 0–13	
November 29	Louisiana College	Tech Stadium; Ruston, LA	W 6–0	
*Non-conference game; ^{†}Homecoming
