= 1930 Kentucky Wesleyan Panthers football team =

American college football season

1930 Kentucky Wesleyan Panthers football
- Conference: Southern Intercollegiate Athletic Association
- Record: 2–4–3 (2–1–1 SIAA)
- Head coach: Rip Van Winkle (3rd season)

1930 Southern Intercollegiate Athletic Association football standings
	Conf.					Overall
Team	W		L		T	W		L		T
Presbyterian $	6	–	0	–	0	9	–	1	–	0
Centre	5	–	0	–	0	7	–	3	–	0
Spring Hill	4	–	0	–	0	6	–	2	–	0
Loyola (LA)	2	–	0	–	0	9	–	1	–	0
Centenary	2	–	0	–	0	8	–	1	–	1
Western Kentucky State Teachers	6	–	1	–	0	8	–	1	–	1
Louisiana Normal	4	–	1	–	0	7	–	2	–	0
Mississippi College	4	–	1	–	0	7	–	2	–	0
The Citadel	3	–	1	–	1	4	–	5	–	2
Kentucky Wesleyan	2	–	1	–	1	2	–	4	–	3
Chattanooga	3	–	2	–	1	5	–	3	–	2
Mercer	3	–	2	–	0	4	–	5	–	0
Millsaps	3	–	3	–	0	6	–	3	–	0
Louisville	2	–	2	–	0	5	–	3	–	0
Birmingham–Southern	3	–	3	–	0	5	–	4	–	0
Stetson	3	–	3	–	0	5	–	3	–	0
Howard (AL)	2	–	3	–	0	5	–	5	–	0
Miami (FL)	2	–	3	–	1	3	–	4	–	1
Southwestern (TN)	1	–	2	–	0	6	–	3	–	0
Erskine	1	–	2	–	1	2	–	5	–	1
Louisiana Tech	2	–	5	–	0	3	–	6	–	0
Georgetown (KY)	1	–	3	–	0	2	–	7	–	0
Wofford	1	–	3	–	0	2	–	9	–	0
Union (TN)	1	–	4	–	0	1	–	5	–	2
Transylvania	1	–	4	–	1	1	–	5	–	2
Louisiana College	1	–	5	–	0	2	–	6	–	0
SW Louisiana	1	–	5	–	0	2	–	8	–	0
Rollins	0	–	0	–	2	2	–	1	–	3
Newberry	0	–	2	–	1	0	–	5	–	3
Southern College	0	–	4	–	1	0	–	6	–	1
Eastern Kentucky	0	–	4	–	0	1	–	7	–	0
$ – Conference champion

The 1930 Kentucky Wesleyan Panthers football team represented Kentucky Wesleyan College as a member the Southern Intercollegiate Athletic Association (SIAA) during the 1930 college football season. Led by third-year head coach Rip Van Winkle, the Panthers compiled an overall record of 2–4–3, with a mark of 2–1–1 in conference play. At the conclusion of the season, the football program at Wesleyan was discontinued. The college subsequently reinstated football for the 1983 season.

== Schedule ==
Date	Opponent	Site	Result	Source
September 20	Bethel (KY)*	Winchester, KY	T 13–13	
September 27	at Emory and Henry*	Fullerton Field; Emory, VA	T 26–26	
October 3	at Cincinnati*	Nippert Stadium; Cincinnati, OH	L 0–6	
October 11	at Miami (OH)*	Miami Field; Oxford, OH	L 0–20	
October 24	Eastern Kentucky	Winchester, KY	W 33–0	
November 1	at Western Kentucky State Teachers	Bowling Green, KY	L 14–25	
November 8	Georgetown (KY)	Winchester, KY	W 19–0	
November 15	at Army*	Michie Stadium; West Point, NY	L 2–47	
November 27	at Transylvania	Thomas Field; Lexington, KY	T 0–0	
*Non-conference game
