= 1930 Louisiana Normal Demons football team =

American college football season

1930 Louisiana Normal Demons football
- Conference: Southern Intercollegiate Athletic Association
- Record: 7–2 (4–1 SIAA)
- Head coach: H. Lee Prather (17th season)
- Home stadium: Demon Field

1930 Southern Intercollegiate Athletic Association football standings
	Conf.					Overall
Team	W		L		T	W		L		T
Presbyterian $	6	–	0	–	0	9	–	1	–	0
Centre	5	–	0	–	0	7	–	3	–	0
Spring Hill	4	–	0	–	0	6	–	2	–	0
Loyola (LA)	2	–	0	–	0	9	–	1	–	0
Centenary	2	–	0	–	0	8	–	1	–	1
Western Kentucky State Teachers	6	–	1	–	0	8	–	1	–	1
Louisiana Normal	4	–	1	–	0	7	–	2	–	0
Mississippi College	4	–	1	–	0	7	–	2	–	0
The Citadel	3	–	1	–	1	4	–	5	–	2
Kentucky Wesleyan	2	–	1	–	1	2	–	4	–	3
Chattanooga	3	–	2	–	1	5	–	3	–	2
Mercer	3	–	2	–	0	4	–	5	–	0
Millsaps	3	–	3	–	0	6	–	3	–	0
Louisville	2	–	2	–	0	5	–	3	–	0
Birmingham–Southern	3	–	3	–	0	5	–	4	–	0
Stetson	3	–	3	–	0	5	–	3	–	0
Howard (AL)	2	–	3	–	0	5	–	5	–	0
Miami (FL)	2	–	3	–	1	3	–	4	–	1
Southwestern (TN)	1	–	2	–	0	6	–	3	–	0
Erskine	1	–	2	–	1	2	–	5	–	1
Louisiana Tech	2	–	5	–	0	3	–	6	–	0
Georgetown (KY)	1	–	3	–	0	2	–	7	–	0
Wofford	1	–	3	–	0	2	–	9	–	0
Union (TN)	1	–	4	–	0	1	–	5	–	2
Transylvania	1	–	4	–	1	1	–	5	–	2
Louisiana College	1	–	5	–	0	2	–	6	–	0
SW Louisiana	1	–	5	–	0	2	–	8	–	0
Rollins	0	–	0	–	2	2	–	1	–	3
Newberry	0	–	2	–	1	0	–	5	–	3
Southern College	0	–	4	–	1	0	–	6	–	1
Eastern Kentucky	0	–	4	–	0	1	–	7	–	0
$ – Conference champion

The 1930 Louisiana Normal Demons football team represented the Louisiana State Normal College—now known as Northwestern State University—as a member the Southern Intercollegiate Athletic Association (SIAA) during the 1930 college football season. Led by 17th-year head coach H. Lee Prather, the Demons compiled an overall record of 7–2 with a mark of 4–1 in conference play.

== Schedule ==
Date	Opponent	Site	Result	Source
September 26	at Loyola (LA)	Loyola Stadium; New Orleans LA	L 7–31	
October 3	East Texas State*	Demon Field; Natchitoches, LA	W 20–0	
October 11	Sam Houston State*	Demon Field; Natchitoches, LA	L 2–12	
October 18	at Louisiana College	Alumni Field; Pineville, LA	W 18–6	
October 24	Union (TN)	Demon Field; Natchitoches, LA	W 14–6	
October 31	Louisiana Tech	Demon Field; Natchitoches, LA (rivalry)	W 19–14	
November 8	at Stephen F. Austin*	Birdwell Field; Nacogdoches, TX	W 21–20	
November 14	Mississippi State Teachers*	Demon Field; Natchitoches, LA	W 32–12	
November 27	at Southwestern Louisiana	Campus Athletic Field; Lafayette, LA	W 18–6	
*Non-conference game
