= 1930 Mississippi College Choctaws football team =

American college football season

1930 Mississippi College Choctaws football
- Conference: Southern Intercollegiate Athletic Association
- Record: 7–2 (4–1 SIAA)
- Head coach: Stanley L. Robinson (6th season)
- Home stadium: Provine Field; Municipal Stadium

1930 Southern Intercollegiate Athletic Association football standings
	Conf.					Overall
Team	W		L		T	W		L		T
Presbyterian $	6	–	0	–	0	9	–	1	–	0
Centre	5	–	0	–	0	7	–	3	–	0
Spring Hill	4	–	0	–	0	6	–	2	–	0
Loyola (LA)	2	–	0	–	0	9	–	1	–	0
Centenary	2	–	0	–	0	8	–	1	–	1
Western Kentucky State Teachers	6	–	1	–	0	8	–	1	–	1
Louisiana Normal	4	–	1	–	0	7	–	2	–	0
Mississippi College	4	–	1	–	0	7	–	2	–	0
The Citadel	3	–	1	–	1	4	–	5	–	2
Kentucky Wesleyan	2	–	1	–	1	2	–	4	–	3
Chattanooga	3	–	2	–	1	5	–	3	–	2
Mercer	3	–	2	–	0	4	–	5	–	0
Millsaps	3	–	3	–	0	6	–	3	–	0
Louisville	2	–	2	–	0	5	–	3	–	0
Birmingham–Southern	3	–	3	–	0	5	–	4	–	0
Stetson	3	–	3	–	0	5	–	3	–	0
Howard (AL)	2	–	3	–	0	5	–	5	–	0
Miami (FL)	2	–	3	–	1	3	–	4	–	1
Southwestern (TN)	1	–	2	–	0	6	–	3	–	0
Erskine	1	–	2	–	1	2	–	5	–	1
Louisiana Tech	2	–	5	–	0	3	–	6	–	0
Georgetown (KY)	1	–	3	–	0	2	–	7	–	0
Wofford	1	–	3	–	0	2	–	9	–	0
Union (TN)	1	–	4	–	0	1	–	5	–	2
Transylvania	1	–	4	–	1	1	–	5	–	2
Louisiana College	1	–	5	–	0	2	–	6	–	0
SW Louisiana	1	–	5	–	0	2	–	8	–	0
Rollins	0	–	0	–	2	2	–	1	–	3
Newberry	0	–	2	–	1	0	–	5	–	3
Southern College	0	–	4	–	1	0	–	6	–	1
Eastern Kentucky	0	–	4	–	0	1	–	7	–	0
$ – Conference champion

The 1930 Mississippi College Choctaws football team was an American football team that represented Mississippi College as a member of the Southern Intercollegiate Athletic Association (SIAA) during the 1930 college football season. In their sixth year under head coach Stanley L. Robinson, the team compiled a 7–2 record.

== Schedule ==
Date	Opponent	Site	Result	Source
September 27	at Louisiana College	Alumni Field; Pineville, LA	W 33–14	
October 4	Mississippi A&M*	Municipal Stadium; Jackson, MS	W 13–12	
October 11	Mississippi State Teachers*	Provine Field; Clinton, MS	W 18–6	
October 17	Louisiana Tech	Municipal Stadium; Jackson, MS	W 39–0	
October 25	at Chattanooga	Chamberlain Field; Chattanooga, TN	L 7–24	
November 1	at Colgate*	Whitnall Field; Hamilton, NY	L 0–34	
November 8	UNAM*	Municipal Stadium; Jackson, MS	W 40–0	
November 15	Birmingham–Southern	Provine Field; Clinton, MS	W 6–0	
November 27	vs. Millsaps	Municipal Stadium; Jackson, MS (rivalry)	W 8–7	
*Non-conference game
