= 1930 Louisville Cardinals football team =

American college football season

1930 Louisville Cardinals football
- Conference: Southern Intercollegiate Athletic Association
- Record: 5–3 (2–2 SIAA)
- Head coach: Tom King (6th season)
- Home stadium: Parkway Field

1930 Southern Intercollegiate Athletic Association football standings
	Conf.					Overall
Team	W		L		T	W		L		T
Presbyterian $	6	–	0	–	0	9	–	1	–	0
Centre	5	–	0	–	0	7	–	3	–	0
Spring Hill	4	–	0	–	0	6	–	2	–	0
Loyola (LA)	2	–	0	–	0	9	–	1	–	0
Centenary	2	–	0	–	0	8	–	1	–	1
Western Kentucky State Teachers	6	–	1	–	0	8	–	1	–	1
Louisiana Normal	4	–	1	–	0	7	–	2	–	0
Mississippi College	4	–	1	–	0	7	–	2	–	0
The Citadel	3	–	1	–	1	4	–	5	–	2
Kentucky Wesleyan	2	–	1	–	1	2	–	4	–	3
Chattanooga	3	–	2	–	1	5	–	3	–	2
Mercer	3	–	2	–	0	4	–	5	–	0
Millsaps	3	–	3	–	0	6	–	3	–	0
Louisville	2	–	2	–	0	5	–	3	–	0
Birmingham–Southern	3	–	3	–	0	5	–	4	–	0
Stetson	3	–	3	–	0	5	–	3	–	0
Howard (AL)	2	–	3	–	0	5	–	5	–	0
Miami (FL)	2	–	3	–	1	3	–	4	–	1
Southwestern (TN)	1	–	2	–	0	6	–	3	–	0
Erskine	1	–	2	–	1	2	–	5	–	1
Louisiana Tech	2	–	5	–	0	3	–	6	–	0
Georgetown (KY)	1	–	3	–	0	2	–	7	–	0
Wofford	1	–	3	–	0	2	–	9	–	0
Union (TN)	1	–	4	–	0	1	–	5	–	2
Transylvania	1	–	4	–	1	1	–	5	–	2
Louisiana College	1	–	5	–	0	2	–	6	–	0
SW Louisiana	1	–	5	–	0	2	–	8	–	0
Rollins	0	–	0	–	2	2	–	1	–	3
Newberry	0	–	2	–	1	0	–	5	–	3
Southern College	0	–	4	–	1	0	–	6	–	1
Eastern Kentucky	0	–	4	–	0	1	–	7	–	0
$ – Conference champion

The 1930 Louisville Cardinals football team was an American football team that represented the University of Louisville as a member of the Southern Intercollegiate Athletic Association (SIAA) during the 1930 college football season. In their sixth and final season under head coach Tom King, the Cardinals compiled an overall record of 5–3 with a mark of 2–2 in SIAA play.

== Schedule ==
Date	Opponent	Site	Result	Source
October 4	Hanover*	Maxwell Field; Louisville, KY	W 32–12	
October 11	Transylvania	Maxwell Field; Louisville, KY	W 18–0	
October 17	Eastern Kentucky	Maxwell Field; Louisville, KY	W 52–0	
October 25	at Western Kentucky State Teachers	Bowling Green, KY	L 6–7	
November 1	Centre	Parkway Field; Louisville, KY	L 0–28	
November 8	at DePaul*	DePaul Field; Chicago, IL	L 0–14	
November 15	at Marshall*	Fairfield Stadium; Huntington, WV	W 13–12	
November 22	Earlham*	Parkway Field; Louisville, KY	W 13–0	
*Non-conference game
