= 1930 Rollins Tars football team =

American college football season

1930 Rollins Tars football
- Conference: Southern Intercollegiate Athletic Association
- Record: 2–1–3 (0–0–2 SIAA)
- Head coach: Jack McDowall (2nd season)
- Home stadium: Harper-Shepherd Field; Tinker Field

1930 Southern Intercollegiate Athletic Association football standings
	Conf.					Overall
Team	W		L		T	W		L		T
Presbyterian $	6	–	0	–	0	9	–	1	–	0
Centre	5	–	0	–	0	7	–	3	–	0
Spring Hill	4	–	0	–	0	6	–	2	–	0
Loyola (LA)	2	–	0	–	0	9	–	1	–	0
Centenary	2	–	0	–	0	8	–	1	–	1
Western Kentucky State Teachers	6	–	1	–	0	8	–	1	–	1
Louisiana Normal	4	–	1	–	0	7	–	2	–	0
Mississippi College	4	–	1	–	0	7	–	2	–	0
The Citadel	3	–	1	–	1	4	–	5	–	2
Kentucky Wesleyan	2	–	1	–	1	2	–	4	–	3
Chattanooga	3	–	2	–	1	5	–	3	–	2
Mercer	3	–	2	–	0	4	–	5	–	0
Millsaps	3	–	3	–	0	6	–	3	–	0
Louisville	2	–	2	–	0	5	–	3	–	0
Birmingham–Southern	3	–	3	–	0	5	–	4	–	0
Stetson	3	–	3	–	0	5	–	3	–	0
Howard (AL)	2	–	3	–	0	5	–	5	–	0
Miami (FL)	2	–	3	–	1	3	–	4	–	1
Southwestern (TN)	1	–	2	–	0	6	–	3	–	0
Erskine	1	–	2	–	1	2	–	5	–	1
Louisiana Tech	2	–	5	–	0	3	–	6	–	0
Georgetown (KY)	1	–	3	–	0	2	–	7	–	0
Wofford	1	–	3	–	0	2	–	9	–	0
Union (TN)	1	–	4	–	0	1	–	5	–	2
Transylvania	1	–	4	–	1	1	–	5	–	2
Louisiana College	1	–	5	–	0	2	–	6	–	0
SW Louisiana	1	–	5	–	0	2	–	8	–	0
Rollins	0	–	0	–	2	2	–	1	–	3
Newberry	0	–	2	–	1	0	–	5	–	3
Southern College	0	–	4	–	1	0	–	6	–	1
Eastern Kentucky	0	–	4	–	0	1	–	7	–	0
$ – Conference champion

The 1930 Rollins Tars football team was an American football team that represented Rollins College as a member of the Southern Intercollegiate Athletic Association (SIAA) during the 1930 college football season. Led by Jack McDowall in his second season as head coach, the Tars compiled an overall record of 2–1–3.

== Schedule ==
Date	Opponent	Site	Result	Source
October 20	at South Georgia*	Douglas, GA	W 12–6	
October 25	St. Petersburg College*	Tinker Field; Orlando, FL	W 41–0	
November 6	Southern College	Tinker Field; Orlando, FL	T 13–13	
November 21	at Miami (FL)	Moore Park; Miami, FL	T 0–0	
November 27	Florida "B" team*	Tinker Field; Orlando, FL	T 0–0	
December 5	Piedmont*	Harper-Shepherd Field; Winter Park, FL	L 6–13	
*Non-conference game
