= Herb McQuillan =

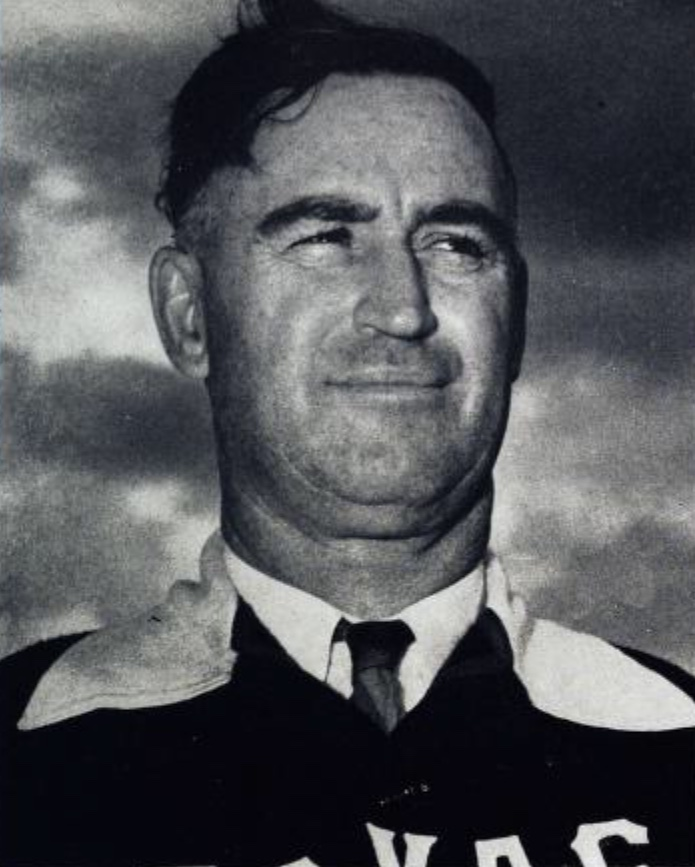
- McQuillan in the 1940 Long Horn

Biographical details
- Born: October 25, 1891; Rochester, Minnesota, U.S.
- Died: November 25, 1972 (aged 81); Tallahassee, Florida, U.S.

Coaching career (HC unless noted)

Football
- 1922–1923: Lakeland HS (FL)
- 1924–1934: Stetson
- 1936–1939: Texas A&M (assistant)
- 1954–1956: Stetson

Basketball
- 1924–1935: Stetson
- 1935–1941: Texas A&M
- 1941–1948: TCU

Administrative career (AD unless noted)
- 1924–1935: Stetson

Head coaching record
- Overall: 53–40–9 (college football); 220–224 (college basketball)

Herbert Raymond "Hub" McQuillan (October 25, 1891 – November 25, 1972) was an American football and basketball coach and college athletics administrator. He served as the head football coach at Stetson University from 1924 to 1934 and again from 1955 to 1956, compiling a record of 53–40–9. McQuillan was also the head basketball coach at Stetson from 1924 to 1935, at Texas A&M University from 1935 to 1941, and at Texas Christian University from 1941 to 1948, amassing a career college basketball record of 220–224.

McQuillan was a native of Rochester, Minnesota. He died on November 25, 1972, at Tallahassee Memorial Hospital in Tallahassee, Florida.

== Head coaching record ==
=== College football ===
Year	Team	Overall	Conference	Standing	Bowl/playoffs
Stetson Hatters (Independent) (1924–1925)
1924	Stetson	6–0			
1925	Stetson	6–2–1			
Stetson Hatters (Southern Intercollegiate Athletic Association) (1926–1934)
1926	Stetson	5–1–1	3–1	T–4th	
1927	Stetson	6–0–1	4–0–1	6th	
1928	Stetson	4–3	2–3	T–18th	
1929	Stetson	5–1	3–1	T–9th	
1930	Stetson	5–3	3–3	T–13th	
1931	Stetson	3–5	1–5	T–27th	
1932	Stetson	3–1–1	0–0	N/A	
1933	Stetson	3–3–1	0–0–1	T–29th	
1934	Stetson	2–4–1	0–2	29th	
Stetson Hatters (Independent) (1954–1956)
1954	Stetson	1–7			
1955	Stetson	2–4–2			
1956	Stetson	2–6–1			
Stetson:		53–40–9	16–15–2		
Total:		53–40–9			
