= Ernest E. Brett =

American football coach (1895–1948)

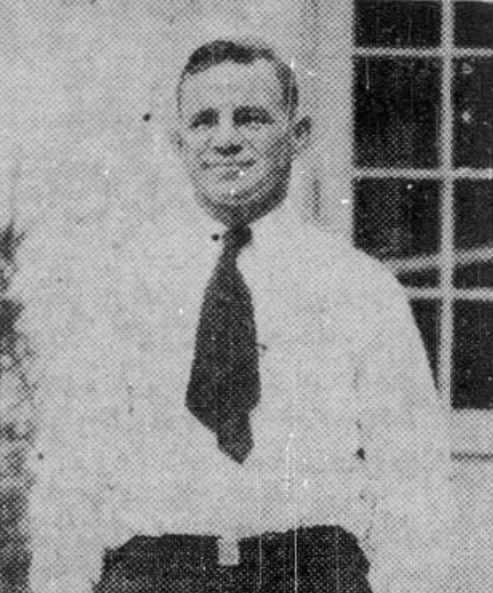
- Brett in 1930

Biographical details
- Born: March 25, 1895; Cohasset, Massachusetts, U.S.
- Died: August 31, 1948 (aged 53); Miami, Florida, U.S.
- Education: International YMCA College (1919)

Playing career

Football
- 1914: Westbrook Seminary
- 1916–1917: Springfield

Basketball
- 1914: Westbrook Seminary

Baseball
- 1915: Westbrook Seminary

Wrestling
- 1915–1917: Springfield

Boxing
- 1915–1917: Springfield
- Positions: End, fullback (football)

Coaching career (HC unless noted)

Football
- 1926–1929: Miami (FL) (assistant)
- 1930: Miami (FL)

Wrestling
- 1916–1917: Springfield (SA)
- 1926–1931: Miami (FL)

Boxing
- 1926–1931: Miami (FL)

Administrative career (AD unless noted)
- 1918–1919: Springfield

Head coaching record
- Overall: 3–4–1 (football)

Ernest Emil Brett (né Bretschneider; March 25, 1895 – August 31, 1948) was an American college football coach. He served as the head football coach at the University of Miami for one season, in 1930, compiling a record of 3–4–1.

Brett was born on March 25, 1895, under the last name Bretschneider, in Cohasset, Massachusetts, to Paul G. Bretschneider, a baker. His family moved to Portland, Maine, where he grew up and eventually attended Westbrook Seminary. With Westbrook, Brett played football, basketball, and baseball. In fall 1915, he enrolled at the International YMCA College and quickly became a member of the football, wrestling, and boxing teams. He also served as a student assistant for the wrestling team. He coached wrestling and boxing at a Connecticut academy during his stint in college.

During the summers, Brett worked as a lifeguard after passing the United States Volunteer Life Saving Corps exams. He signed on to become the "master guard" for Loon Pond, a resort in Springfield, Massachusetts, where he was in charge of a group of lifeguards, including former Bates captain Spud Drew.

Brett left the school from 1917 to 1918 as he enlisted in the United States Marine Corps during World War I. After his discharge, he returned to Springfield to finish his degree and served as the athletic director for the school.

In March 1919, Brett officially changed his name from Bretschneider to Brett. Shortly after, he graduated from Springfield.

Between 1920 and 1925, Brett worked as an assistant professor and in some capacity in athletics for Washington and Lee University. In 1926, he moved to Miami and became an assistant coach for the inaugural Miami Hurricanes football team. Alongside assisting the football team, he also coached the wrestling and boxing teams. He served as an assistant until 1929, when he was promoted to head football coach. In one season, he led the team to a 3–4–1 record.

After the 1930 season, Brett resigned and became a real estate agent, working for his own firm, Hundley & Brett. In 1940, he was arrested and fined after drunk driving and crashing into a freight train. He also worked for North Shore Bank before dying on August 31, 1948, in Miami.

== Head coaching record ==
=== Football ===
Year	Team	Overall	Conference	Standing	Bowl/playoffs
Miami Hurricanes (Southern Intercollegiate Athletic Association) (1930)
1930	Miami	3–4–1	2–3–1	T–17th	
Miami:		3–4–1	2–3–1		
Total:		3–4–1			
