= Horace Allen (baseball) =

American baseball player (1899–1981)

- Outfielder
- Born: June 11, 1899; DeLand, Florida, U.S.
- Died: July 5, 1981 (aged 82); Canton, North Carolina, U.S.
- Batted: Left Threw: Right

MLB debut
- June 15, 1919, for the Brooklyn Robins

Last MLB appearance
- September 27, 1919, for the Brooklyn Robins

MLB statistics
- Batting average: .000
- Hits: 0
- Strikeouts: 2
- Stats at Baseball Reference

Teams
- Brooklyn Robins (1919)

Horace Tanner Allen (June 11, 1899 – July 5, 1981), nicknamed "Pug", was an American outfielder in Major League Baseball.

Allen was born on July 5, 1899, in DeLand, Florida. He played for the Georgia Tech baseball team. He also played in 4 games for the 1919 Brooklyn Robins, had 7 at-bats, and failed to get a hit.

== Head coaching record ==
=== Football ===
Year	Team	Overall	Conference	Standing	Bowl/playoffs
Stetson Hatters (Independent) (1919–1923)
1919	Stetson	4–4			
1920	Stetson	2–4			
1921	Stetson	1–4			
1922	Stetson	4–2			
1923	Stetson	5–2			
Stetson:		16–16			
Total:		16–16			
