= Henry E. Walden =

American football coach, athletics administrator, educator, military officer (1891–1976)

Biographical details
- Born: July 29, 1891; Cheneyville, Louisiana, U.S.
- Died: June 4, 1976 (aged 84); Alexandria, Louisiana, U.S.

Playing career

Football
- 1911–1914: LSU

Basketball
- 1911–1915: LSU
- Position: End (football)

Coaching career (HC unless noted)

Football
- 1921–1936: Louisiana College

Administrative career (AD unless noted)
- 1921–1937: Louisiana College

Henry Erlick Walden (July 29, 1891 – June 4, 1976) was an American college football coach, athletics administrator, educator, and military officer. He served as the head football coach at Louisiana College—now known as Louisiana Christian University—in Pineville, Louisiana from 1921 to 1936.

Walden attended Bunkie High School in Bunkie, Louisiana and then Louisiana State University (LSU), where he played football and basketball before graduating in 1915. He was the principal of the public school in Pineville, Louisiana and Lecompte High School in Lecompte, Louisiana prior to being hired by Louisiana College in 1921.

In 1912, Walden enlisted in the Louisiana National Guard. During World War I, he served with the American Expeditionary Forces in France, earning a Silver Star for gallantry in 1918. He remained in the military through World War II, retiring from the United States Army as a colonel in 1951. Walden was later a member of the LSU's Board of Supervisors for 12 years. He died on June 4, 1976, at the Veterans Administration Hospital in Alexandria, Louisiana.
