= Walter A. Johnson =

American sports coach (1893–1958)

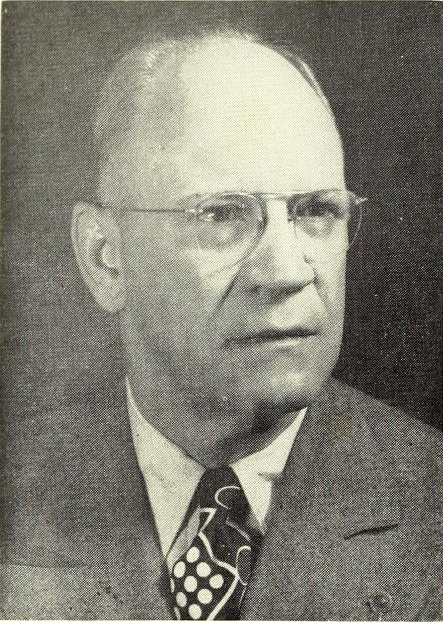
- Johnson, c. 1952

Biographical details
- Born: April 3, 1893
- Died: July 23, 1958 (aged 65); Clinton, South Carolina, U.S.

Coaching career (HC unless noted)

Football
- 1915–1917: Presbyterian
- 1919–1940: Presbyterian

Basketball
- 1915–1930: Presbyterian

Administrative career (AD unless noted)
- 1915–1958: Presbyterian

Head coaching record
- Overall: 102–99–19 (football)

Accomplishments and honors

Championships
- Football; 1 SIAA (1930)

Walter A. Johnson (April 3, 1893 – July 23, 1958) was an American football and basketball coach and college athletics administrator. He coached both sports at Presbyterian College in Clinton, South Carolina. As the athletic director at Presbyterian, he is loosely credited with giving the school's sports teams their unique nickname, the Blue Hose.

A native of Milwaukee, Johnson attended South Division High School, where he played football as a fullback. He graduated from the Normal School of Education in Battle Creek, Michigan in 1915.

Johnson died of a heart ailment, on July 23, 1958, at the age of 65, at his home in Clinton. The former football field at Presbyterian was named in his honor.

== Head coaching record ==
=== Football ===
Year	Team	Overall	Conference	Standing	Bowl/playoffs
Presbyterian Blue Hose (Independent) (1915–1917)
1915	Presbyterian	4–4			
1916	Presbyterian	4–3			
1917	Presbyterian	8–1			
Presbyterian Blue Hose (Independent) (1919–1921)
1919	Presbyterian	4–3–2			
1920	Presbyterian	5–1–1			
1921	Presbyterian	1–7			
Presbyterian Blue Hose (Southern Intercollegiate Athletic Association) (1922–1940)
1922	Presbyterian	6–2–1	2–0	T–2nd	
1923	Presbyterian	4–3–1	2–1–1	T–6th	
1924	Presbyterian	1–6–1	1–3	T–14th	
1925	Presbyterian	3–6	2–4	T–14th	
1926	Presbyterian	7–2	5–1	3rd	
1927	Presbyterian	3–3–3	2–2–1	T–9th	
1928	Presbyterian	4–6	2–5	23rd	
1929	Presbyterian	4–4–1	3–3	T–16th	
1930	Presbyterian	9–1	6–0	1st	
1931	Presbyterian	2–5–2	1–4–1	T–24th	
1932	Presbyterian	5–2–1	3–1–1	10th	
1933	Presbyterian	4–2–2	3–2	T–11th	
1934	Presbyterian	3–4–2	3–2–1	T–14th	
1935	Presbyterian	2–7	2–4	T–22nd	
1936	Presbyterian	3–6	3–2	T–14th	
1937	Presbyterian	0–10	0–3	T–29th	
1938	Presbyterian	6–4	6–1	T–5th	
1939	Presbyterian	4–3–2	3–1–2	T–9th	
1940	Presbyterian	6–4	5–3	13th	
Presbyterian:		102–99–19	54–42–7		
Total:		102–99–19			
National championship Conference title Conference division title or championship game berth
