= Old Bailey Stadium =

Multi-purpose stadium in South Carolina, United States

- Interactive map of Old Bailey Stadium
- Location: 503 South Broad Street; Clinton, South Carolina
- Coordinates: 34.4663°N 81.8738°W
- Owner: Presbyterian College
- Operator: Presbyterian College
- Capacity: 3,000
- Surface: Natural Grass

Construction
- Groundbreaking: 1927
- Opened: September 28, 1928
- Demolished: 2018

Tenant
- Presbyterian Blue Hose (NCAA) (1928–2018)

Old Bailey Stadium was a 3,000-seat multi-purpose stadium in Clinton, South Carolina. It was the former home of Presbyterian College football and, at the time of its demolition, the home for Presbyterian men's and women's lacrosse teams. The stadium opened before the opening game of the 1928 season, and its first game saw the Blue Hose fall to Mercer, 6–7. It served as the home for PC football until the first two games of the 2002 season. Its last football game was the 2002 home opener, against Charleston Southern, which PC won 26–6. Bailey Memorial Stadium replaced Old Bailey Stadium as the home of Presbyterian College football.

In October 1927, the campus publication The Blue Stocking held a contest to name the "PC athletic field". The winning submission was Johnson Field, after longtime head football coach Walter A. Johnson.

The stadium was demolished in the spring of 2018 to make room for new senior dorms, which were completed for the 2019–20 academic year.
