= Stetson Hatters football =

Intercollegiate American football team in Florida

2026 Stetson Hatters football team
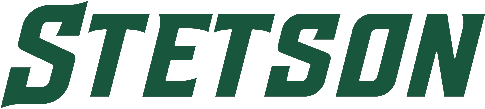
- First season: 1901; 125 years ago (Note: The program was discontinued in 1956. It was relaunched in the 2013 season; 13 years ago.)
- Athletic director: Ricky Ray
- Head coach: Michael Jasper; 1st season, 3–9 (.250)
- Location: DeLand, Florida
- Stadium: Spec Martin Stadium (capacity: 6,000)
- NCAA division: Division I FCS
- Conference: Pioneer Football League
- Colors: Hunter green and white
- All-time record: 206–215–27 (.490)
- Bowl record: 1–0 (1.000)
- Rivalries: Mercer; Rollins; Southern College
- Website: GoHatters.com

The Stetson Hatters football program is the intercollegiate American football team for Stetson University located in the U.S. state of Florida. The team competes in the NCAA Division I Football Championship Subdivision (FCS) and are members of the Pioneer Football League. Stetson's first football team was fielded in 1901, but the school dropped the sport in 1956 and did not reinstate it until 2013. The team plays its home games at the 6,000 seat Spec Martin Stadium in DeLand, Florida. The Hatters are coached by Michael Jasper.

== History ==
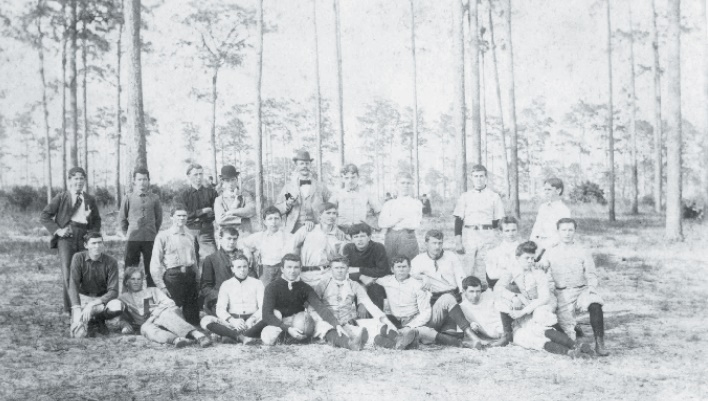
1894 "Forbes" team.

The first organized football game in the state of Florida was an intramural contest between teams from Stetson. Played on November 29, 1894 on a field were the Cummings Gymnasium was later built, the "Forbes" team (named after university president John Forbes) coached by C.B. Rosa defeated the “Stetson” team coached by Harvey MacQuiston. Several more intramural games were played before a three-year suspension of football was instituted due to the perceived brutality of the sport.

On November 22, 1901, Stetson participated in the first intercollegiate football game in the state of Florida. Stetson beat Florida Agricultural College 6–0 in a game played as part of the State Fair in Jacksonville. Stetson claims state titles in 1901, 1903, 1905, 1906, 1907, and 1909.

The Hatters participated in one bowl game, the 1952 Tangerine Bowl. They won 35–20 over Arkansas State.

After a 57-year hiatus, on August 31, 2013, Stetson revived their football program against Warner University (who were playing in their inaugural football game) at Spec Martin Stadium. The Hatters held a lead of 10–3 with 12:35 remaining in the 2nd quarter when the game was suspended due to lightning. After more than a two-hour delay, the game was officially postponed until the next day. On September 1, 2013, the game resumed, and Stetson won 31–3. It was Stetson's first win since defeating the University of Havana 64–0 at the end of the 1956 season.

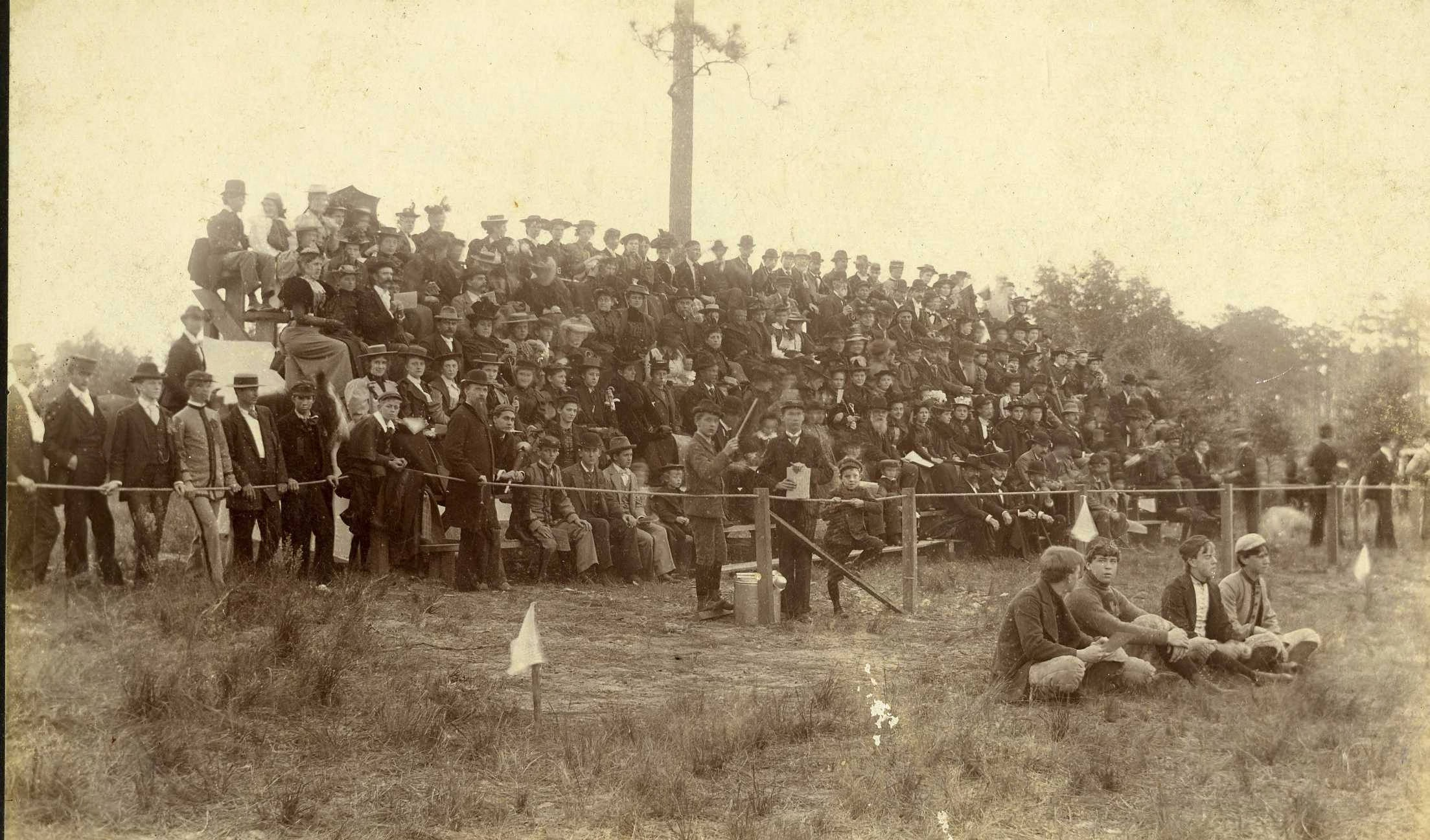
The stands during 1894.

On May 5, 2017, Donald Payne was signed as an undrafted free agent by the Baltimore Ravens. Though he would be cut, he would be picked up by the Jacksonville Jaguars, where he would become a star on special teams, becoming the first player from Stetson to play in the NFL. Payne spent two months on the injured reserve list at Jacksonville near the end of 2018, and was waived in May 2019. He would then sign with the Ravens in August 2019

Stetson finished their 2018 season 8–2, finishing second in the PFL and finishing with their first winning record since renewing the program.

=== Classifications ===
- 2013–present: NCAA Division I FCS

=== Conference memberships ===
- 1901–1925: Independent
- 1926–1931: Southern Intercollegiate Athletic Association
- 1932: Independent
- 1933–1940: Southern Intercollegiate Athletic Association
- 1941–1947: Independent
- 1948–1949: Dixie Conference
- 1950–1956: Independent
- 1957–2012: No team
- 2013–present: Pioneer Football League

== Notable former players ==
Notable alumni include:

- Donald Payne- LB, Washington Commanders
- Donald Parham - TE, Los Angeles Chargers

== List of head coaches ==
Statistics correct as of the end of the 2024 season

The Hatters have had 15 head coaches in over 50 seasons of (interrupted) play, with no play in 1915, from 1917 to 1918, 1941–1945, and 1957–2012.

#	Name	Term	GC	OW	OL	OT	O%	PW	PL
1	Seaton Fleming	1901–1903	7	4	1	2	.714	—	—
2	Litchfield Colton	1904–1911	22	13	6	3	.659	—	—
3	John H. Manning	1912	7	5	2	0	.714	—	—
4	Albert Jordan	1913	3	3	0	0	1.000	—	—
5	C. H. Campbell	1914	5	1	4	0	.200	—	—
6	Bill Hollander	1916	4	3	1	0	.750	—	—
7	Horace Allen	1919–1923	25	11	14	0	.440	—	—
8	Herb McQuillan	1924–1934, 1954–1956	102	53	40	9	.564	—	—
9	Brady Cowell	1935–1940, 1946–1948	79	32	40	7	.449	—	—
10	Bob Trocolor	1949	10	4	5	1	.450	—	—
11	Joe McMullen	1950–1951	21	16	3	2	.810	1	0
12	Jay Pattee	1952–1953	19	6	10	3	.395	—	—
13	Roger Hughes	2013–2021	81	31	50	0	.383	—	—
14	Brian Young	2021–2024	43	13	30	0	.302	—	—
15	Michael Jasper	2025–present	12	3	9	0	.250	—	—

== Bowl game appearances ==
Date	Bowl	Opponent	Result
January 1, 1952	Tangerine Bowl	Arkansas State	W 35–20
Total		1 bowl game	1–0

== Future non-conference opponents ==
Announced schedules as of July 27, 2026.

2026	2027	2029
at South Dakota State	at West Georgia	at West Georgia
Webber International		
at Bethune–Cookman		
at UC Davis		
