= Setzler Field =

American football stadium in Newberry, South Carolina, United States

Coordinates: 34.286133°N 81.622539°W

Setzler Field is a 4,000 seat stadium located on the campus of Newberry College in Newberry, South Carolina. It is the oldest college stadium still in use in South Carolina.

The stadium hosts the football team for the college.
