= Southern College Moccasins football =

- First season: 1912
- Last season: 1935
- Location: Lakeland, Florida
- Stadium: Adair Park
- Conference: Independent
- All-time record: 57–70–8 (.452)
- Rivalries: Stetson

The Southern College Moccasins football, formerly Southern College Blue and White, team represented Southern College—now known as Florida Southern College—in the sport of American football. Southern College fielded a football team from 1912 to 1935, with a break during the 1918 season. From 1926 to 1930, it was a member of the Southern Intercollegiate Athletic Association. In 1913, Southern College lost to Florida, 144–0. In 1919, Southern College upset the Gators, 7–0.

The team's rival was Stetson as the two teams played regularly throughout the early 20th century. They first played in 1914, where Southern College won 12–0 in DeLand, Florida. The game was often played at Plant Field in Tampa, Florida.

In 1922, Southern College began play on its new field, Adair Field, in Lakeland, Florida. The first game played, against rival Stetson, ended in a 52–0 loss for the Moccasins.
