= 1914 West Tennessee State Normal football team =

American college football season

1914 West Tennessee State Normal football
- Conference: Independent
- Record: 3–5
- Head coach: Clyde H. Wilson (3rd season)
- Captain: Erroll Hay
- Home stadium: Red Elm Park

1914 Southern college football independents records
	Conf.			Overall
Team	W	L	T	W		L		T
Texas		–		8	–	0	–	0
Middle Tennessee State Normal		–		5	–	0	–	1
Oklahoma		–		9	–	1	–	1
Delaware		–		7	–	1	–	1
Davidson		–		5	–	1	–	1
Birmingham		–		3	–	1	–	1
Georgia Tech		–		6	–	2	–	0
Presbyterian		–		4	–	1	–	1
Oklahoma A&M		–		6	–	2	–	1
Navy		–		6	–	3	–	0
Maryland		–		5	–	3	–	0
Southwestern Louisiana Industrial		–		5	–	3	–	0
Howard (AL)		–		4	–	3	–	1
Maryville (TN)		–		6	–	4	–	0
Sam Houston Normal		–		3	–	2	–	0
Marshall		–		5	–	4	–	0
West Virginia		–		5	–	4	–	0
Rice		–		3	–	2	–	3
North Texas State Normal		–		3	–	3	–	0
South Carolina		–		5	–	5	–	1
VMI		–		4	–	4	–	0
Mississippi Normal		–		2	–	3	–	1
Texas Mines		–		2	–	3	–	0
Western Kentucky State Normal		–		1	–	2	–	0
Baylor		–		3	–	5	–	2
West Tennessee State Normal		–		3	–	5	–	0
Arkansas		–		3	–	6	–	0
Louisiana Industrial		–		2	–	4	–	0
Wake Forest		–		3	–	6	–	0
Furman		–		2	–	5	–	0
Southwest Texas State		–		2	–	6	–	0
Stetson		–		1	–	4	–	0
Louisville		–		1	–	7	–	0
Catholic University		–		0	–	6	–	1

The 1914 West Tennessee State Normal football team was an American football team that represented West Tennessee State Normal School (now known as the University of Memphis) as an independent during the 1914 college football season. In their third season under head coach Clyde H. Wilson, West Tennessee State Normal compiled a 3–5 record.

== Schedule ==
Date	Time	Opponent	Site	Result	Attendance	Source
October 9	3:15 p.m.	at Osceola Athletic Club	Osceola, AR	W 13–0		
October 16	3:30 p.m.	Central High School	Red Elm Park; Memphis, TN	L 0–19	2,000	
October 24		Christian Brothers	Red Elm Park; Memphis, TN	L 0–9		
October 27		at Jonesboro Aggies	Jonesboro, AR (rivalry)	L 6–18		
October 31		at Bolton College	Brunswick, TN	W 13–9		
November 7		Somerville High School	Memphis, TN	W 26–0		
November 21		at Ole Miss reserves	Oxford, MS	L 0–31		
November 26		at Jackson High School	Jackson, TN	L 6–16		
