= 1914 Navy Midshipmen football team =

American college football season

1914 Navy Midshipmen football
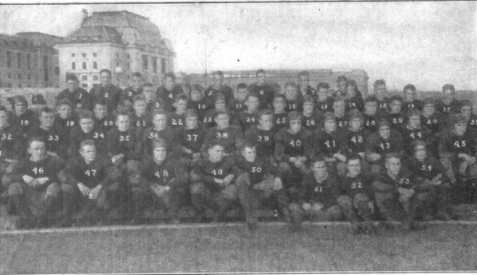
- Conference: Independent
- Record: 6–3
- Head coach: Douglas Legate Howard (4th season)
- Captain: Harvey Overesch
- Home stadium: Worden Field

1914 Southern college football independents records
	Conf.			Overall
Team	W	L	T	W		L		T
Texas		–		8	–	0	–	0
Middle Tennessee State Normal		–		5	–	0	–	1
Oklahoma		–		9	–	1	–	1
Delaware		–		7	–	1	–	1
Davidson		–		5	–	1	–	1
Birmingham		–		3	–	1	–	1
Georgia Tech		–		6	–	2	–	0
Presbyterian		–		4	–	1	–	1
Oklahoma A&M		–		6	–	2	–	1
Navy		–		6	–	3	–	0
Maryland		–		5	–	3	–	0
Southwestern Louisiana Industrial		–		5	–	3	–	0
Howard (AL)		–		4	–	3	–	1
Maryville (TN)		–		6	–	4	–	0
Sam Houston Normal		–		3	–	2	–	0
Marshall		–		5	–	4	–	0
West Virginia		–		5	–	4	–	0
Rice		–		3	–	2	–	3
North Texas State Normal		–		3	–	3	–	0
South Carolina		–		5	–	5	–	1
VMI		–		4	–	4	–	0
Mississippi Normal		–		2	–	3	–	1
Texas Mines		–		2	–	3	–	0
Western Kentucky State Normal		–		1	–	2	–	0
Baylor		–		3	–	5	–	2
West Tennessee State Normal		–		3	–	5	–	0
Arkansas		–		3	–	6	–	0
Louisiana Industrial		–		2	–	4	–	0
Wake Forest		–		3	–	6	–	0
Furman		–		2	–	5	–	0
Southwest Texas State		–		2	–	6	–	0
Stetson		–		1	–	4	–	0
Louisville		–		1	–	7	–	0
Catholic University		–		0	–	6	–	1

The 1914 Navy Midshipmen football team represented the United States Naval Academy during the 1914 college football season. In its fourth season under head coach Douglas Legate Howard, the team compiled a 6–3 record, shut out three opponents, and defeated its opponents by a combined score of 174 to 83.

The annual Army–Navy Game was played on November 28 at Franklin Field in Philadelphia; Army won 20–0.

== Schedule ==
Date	Opponent	Site	Result	Attendance	Source
October 3	Georgetown	Worden Field; Annapolis, MD	W 13–0		
October 10	Pittsburgh	Worden Field; Annapolis, MD	L 6–13	8,000	
October 17	at Penn	Franklin Field; Philadelphia, PA	L 6–13		
October 24	Western Reserve	Worden Field; Annapolis, MD	W 48–0		
October 31	North Carolina A&M	Worden Field; Annapolis, MD	W 16–14		
November 7	Fordham	Worden Field; Annapolis, MD	W 21–0		
November 14	Colby	Worden Field; Annapolis, MD	W 31–21		
November 21	Ursinus	Worden Field; Annapolis, MD	W 33–2		
November 28	vs. Army	Franklin Field; Philadelphia, PA (Army–Navy Game)	L 0–20		
