= Bill May (American football, fl. 1913–15) =

American football player

No. 5
- Position: Quarterback

Career information
- College: Tennessee (1913–1915)

Awards and highlights
- SIAA championship (1914)

W. E. "Bill" May was an American college football player.

== Tennessee Volunteers ==
He was a prominent quarterback for the Tennessee Volunteers of the University of Tennessee from 1913 to 1915.

=== 1914 ===
May led the Volunteers to the Southern Intercollegiate Athletic Association (SIAA) championship in 1914, the first championship of any kind for the Tennessee program. Winning all nine of their games, the 1914 squad was only the second undefeated team in Tennessee history. May threw two touchdown passes to Goat Carroll in the 16–14 victory over Vanderbilt, the first ever victory over the Tennessee rival. Carroll scored all of the Vols points, adding a field goal in between touchdowns. Irby Curry scored all of Vanderbilt's points. An account of the first Tennessee touchdown reads, "Four minutes of play had barely drifted by when Tennessee's weird, mystic, elusive forward pass, May to Carroll, deadly in accuracy, went sailing home for the first touchdown of the game. The chesty Tennessee quarterback sent the oval whizzing for a distance of thirty-five yards and Carroll gathered in the ball near his goal line, when he hurried beneath the posts with all the speed at his command."
