= 1914 Delaware Fightin' Blue Hens football team =

American college football season

1914 Delaware Fightin' Blue Hens football
- Conference: Independent
- Record: 7–1–1
- Head coach: William McAvoy (7th season)
- Captain: Victor H. Handy
- Home stadium: Frazer Field

1914 Southern college football independents records
| | Conf. | | | Overall |
| Team | W | L | T | W | | L | | T |
|---|---|---|---|---|---|---|---|---|
| Texas | | – | | 8 | – | 0 | – | 0 |
| Middle Tennessee State Normal | | – | | 5 | – | 0 | – | 1 |
| Oklahoma | | – | | 9 | – | 1 | – | 1 |
| Delaware | | – | | 7 | – | 1 | – | 1 |
| Davidson | | – | | 5 | – | 1 | – | 1 |
| Birmingham | | – | | 3 | – | 1 | – | 1 |
| Georgia Tech | | – | | 6 | – | 2 | – | 0 |
| Presbyterian | | – | | 4 | – | 1 | – | 1 |
| Oklahoma A&M | | – | | 6 | – | 2 | – | 1 |
| Navy | | – | | 6 | – | 3 | – | 0 |
| Maryland | | – | | 5 | – | 3 | – | 0 |
| Southwestern Louisiana Industrial | | – | | 5 | – | 3 | – | 0 |
| Howard (AL) | | – | | 4 | – | 3 | – | 1 |
| Maryville (TN) | | – | | 6 | – | 4 | – | 0 |
| Sam Houston Normal | | – | | 3 | – | 2 | – | 0 |
| Marshall | | – | | 5 | – | 4 | – | 0 |
| West Virginia | | – | | 5 | – | 4 | – | 0 |
| Rice | | – | | 3 | – | 2 | – | 3 |
| North Texas State Normal | | – | | 3 | – | 3 | – | 0 |
| South Carolina | | – | | 5 | – | 5 | – | 1 |
| VMI | | – | | 4 | – | 4 | – | 0 |
| Mississippi Normal | | – | | 2 | – | 3 | – | 1 |
| Texas Mines | | – | | 2 | – | 3 | – | 0 |
| Western Kentucky State Normal | | – | | 1 | – | 2 | – | 0 |
| Baylor | | – | | 3 | – | 5 | – | 2 |
| West Tennessee State Normal | | – | | 3 | – | 5 | – | 0 |
| Arkansas | | – | | 3 | – | 6 | – | 0 |
| Louisiana Industrial | | – | | 2 | – | 4 | – | 0 |
| Wake Forest | | – | | 3 | – | 6 | – | 0 |
| Furman | | – | | 2 | – | 5 | – | 0 |
| Southwest Texas State | | – | | 2 | – | 6 | – | 0 |
| Stetson | | – | | 1 | – | 4 | – | 0 |
| Louisville | | – | | 1 | – | 7 | – | 0 |
| Catholic University | | – | | 0 | – | 6 | – | 1 |

The 1914 Delaware Fightin' Blue Hens football team was an American football team that represented Delaware College (later renamed the University of Delaware) as an independent during the 1914 college football season. In their seventh season under head coach William McAvoy, the Blue Hens compiled a 7–1–1 record and outscored opponents by a total of 172 to 66. Victor H. Handy was the team captain. The team played its home games at Frazer Field in Newark, Delaware.

== Schedule ==
| Date | Opponent | Site | Result | Attendance | Source |
|---|---|---|---|---|---|
| September 26 | at Lafayette | March Field; Easton, PA | L 0–41 | | |
| October 3 | Baltimore Polytechnic Institute | Frazer Field; Newark, DE | W 27–6 | | |
| October 10 | Baltimore City College | Frazer Field; Newark, DE | W 49–0 | | |
| October 17 | Temple | Frazer Field; Newark, DE | W 20–7 | | |
| October 24 | at Pennsylvania Military | Chester, PA | W 13–0 | | |
| October 31 | at Stevens | Hoboken, NJ | T 0–0 | | |
| November 7 | Catholic University | Frazer Field; Newark, DE | W 13–0 | | |
| November 14 | Western Maryland | Frazer Field; Newark, DE | W 17–12 | | |
| November 26 | Carlisle reserves | Frazer Field; Newark, DE | W 33–0 | | |
