= 1914 Howard Baptists football team =

American college football season

1914 Howard Baptists football
- Conference: Independent
- Record: 4–3–1
- Head coach: B. L. Noojin (3rd season)
- Home stadium: Howard Athletic Field; Rickwood Field

1914 Southern college football independents records
	Conf.			Overall
Team	W	L	T	W		L		T
Texas		–		8	–	0	–	0
Middle Tennessee State Normal		–		5	–	0	–	1
Oklahoma		–		9	–	1	–	1
Delaware		–		7	–	1	–	1
Davidson		–		5	–	1	–	1
Birmingham		–		3	–	1	–	1
Georgia Tech		–		6	–	2	–	0
Presbyterian		–		4	–	1	–	1
Oklahoma A&M		–		6	–	2	–	1
Navy		–		6	–	3	–	0
Maryland		–		5	–	3	–	0
Southwestern Louisiana Industrial		–		5	–	3	–	0
Howard (AL)		–		4	–	3	–	1
Maryville (TN)		–		6	–	4	–	0
Sam Houston Normal		–		3	–	2	–	0
Marshall		–		5	–	4	–	0
West Virginia		–		5	–	4	–	0
Rice		–		3	–	2	–	3
North Texas State Normal		–		3	–	3	–	0
South Carolina		–		5	–	5	–	1
VMI		–		4	–	4	–	0
Mississippi Normal		–		2	–	3	–	1
Texas Mines		–		2	–	3	–	0
Western Kentucky State Normal		–		1	–	2	–	0
Baylor		–		3	–	5	–	2
West Tennessee State Normal		–		3	–	5	–	0
Arkansas		–		3	–	6	–	0
Louisiana Industrial		–		2	–	4	–	0
Wake Forest		–		3	–	6	–	0
Furman		–		2	–	5	–	0
Southwest Texas State		–		2	–	6	–	0
Stetson		–		1	–	4	–	0
Louisville		–		1	–	7	–	0
Catholic University		–		0	–	6	–	1

The 1914 Howard Baptists football team was an American football team that represented Howard College (now known as the Samford University) as an independent during the 1914 college football season. In their third year under head coach B. L. Noojin, the team compiled an 4–3–1 record.

== Schedule ==
Date	Opponent	Site	Result	Attendance	Source
October 3	at Alabama	The Quad; Tuscaloosa, AL	L 0–13		
October 10	Alabama Presbyterian	Howard Athletic Field; Birmingham, AL	W 47–0		
October 14	at Seventh District Agricultural School	Marshall County Fairgrounds; Albertville, AL	W 20–0	3,000	
October 24	at Chattanooga	Chamberlain Field; Chattanooga, TN	L 0–14		
October 31	at Spring Hill	Mobile, AL	W 7–2		
November 6	Sixth District Agricultural School	Howard Athletic Field; Birmingham, AL	W 6–0		
November 13	vs. Birmingham	Rickwood Field; Birmingham, AL	T 6–6		
November 26	at Mississippi College	Mississippi State Fairgrounds; Jackson, MS	L 6–27		
