= 1914 Louisville Cardinals football team =

American college football season

1914 Louisville Cardinals football
- Conference: Independent
- Record: 1–4
- Head coach: Bruce Baker (1st season)
- Home stadium: Eclipse Park

1914 Southern college football independents records
	Conf.			Overall
Team	W	L	T	W		L		T
Texas		–		8	–	0	–	0
Middle Tennessee State Normal		–		5	–	0	–	1
Oklahoma		–		9	–	1	–	1
Delaware		–		7	–	1	–	1
Davidson		–		5	–	1	–	1
Birmingham		–		3	–	1	–	1
Georgia Tech		–		6	–	2	–	0
Presbyterian		–		4	–	1	–	1
Oklahoma A&M		–		6	–	2	–	1
Navy		–		6	–	3	–	0
Maryland		–		5	–	3	–	0
Southwestern Louisiana Industrial		–		5	–	3	–	0
Howard (AL)		–		4	–	3	–	1
Maryville (TN)		–		6	–	4	–	0
Sam Houston Normal		–		3	–	2	–	0
Marshall		–		5	–	4	–	0
West Virginia		–		5	–	4	–	0
Rice		–		3	–	2	–	3
North Texas State Normal		–		3	–	3	–	0
South Carolina		–		5	–	5	–	1
VMI		–		4	–	4	–	0
Mississippi Normal		–		2	–	3	–	1
Texas Mines		–		2	–	3	–	0
Western Kentucky State Normal		–		1	–	2	–	0
Baylor		–		3	–	5	–	2
West Tennessee State Normal		–		3	–	5	–	0
Arkansas		–		3	–	6	–	0
Louisiana Industrial		–		2	–	4	–	0
Wake Forest		–		3	–	6	–	0
Furman		–		2	–	5	–	0
Southwest Texas State		–		2	–	6	–	0
Stetson		–		1	–	4	–	0
Louisville		–		1	–	7	–	0
Catholic University		–		0	–	6	–	1

The 1914 Louisville Cardinals football team was an American football team that represented the University of Louisville as an independent during the 1914 college football season. In their first and only season under head coach Bruce Baker, the Cardinals compiled a 1–4 record. The team played its home games at Eclipse Park in Louisville, Kentucky.

== Schedule ==
Date	Opponent	Site	Result	Source
October 17	Tennessee	Eclipse Park; Louisville, KY	L 0–66	
October 31	Wabash	Louisville, KY	L 3–7	
November 7	at Cumberland (TN)	Lebanon, TN	L 0–20	
November 14	at Kentucky	Lexington, KY (rivalry)	L 0–42	
November 21	Rose Polytechnic	Louisville, KY	W 23–0	
