= 1914 Oklahoma A&M Aggies football team =

American college football season

1914 Oklahoma A&M Aggies football
- Conference: Independent
- Record: 6–2–1
- Head coach: Paul J. Davis (6th season)
- Home stadium: Lewis Field

1914 Southern college football independents records
	Conf.			Overall
Team	W	L	T	W		L		T
Texas		–		8	–	0	–	0
Middle Tennessee State Normal		–		5	–	0	–	1
Oklahoma		–		9	–	1	–	1
Delaware		–		7	–	1	–	1
Davidson		–		5	–	1	–	1
Birmingham		–		3	–	1	–	1
Georgia Tech		–		6	–	2	–	0
Presbyterian		–		4	–	1	–	1
Oklahoma A&M		–		6	–	2	–	1
Navy		–		6	–	3	–	0
Maryland		–		5	–	3	–	0
Southwestern Louisiana Industrial		–		5	–	3	–	0
Howard (AL)		–		4	–	3	–	1
Maryville (TN)		–		6	–	4	–	0
Sam Houston Normal		–		3	–	2	–	0
Marshall		–		5	–	4	–	0
West Virginia		–		5	–	4	–	0
Rice		–		3	–	2	–	3
North Texas State Normal		–		3	–	3	–	0
South Carolina		–		5	–	5	–	1
VMI		–		4	–	4	–	0
Mississippi Normal		–		2	–	3	–	1
Texas Mines		–		2	–	3	–	0
Western Kentucky State Normal		–		1	–	2	–	0
Baylor		–		3	–	5	–	2
West Tennessee State Normal		–		3	–	5	–	0
Arkansas		–		3	–	6	–	0
Louisiana Industrial		–		2	–	4	–	0
Wake Forest		–		3	–	6	–	0
Furman		–		2	–	5	–	0
Southwest Texas State		–		2	–	6	–	0
Stetson		–		1	–	4	–	0
Louisville		–		1	–	7	–	0
Catholic University		–		0	–	6	–	1

The 1914 Oklahoma A&M Aggies football team represented Oklahoma A&M College as an independent in the 1914 college football season. This was the 14th year of football at A&M and the sixth under Paul J. Davis. The Aggies played their home games at Lewis Field in Stillwater, Oklahoma. They finished the season 6–2–1.

== Schedule ==
Date	Time	Opponent	Site	Result	Source
October 9		Phillips	Lewis Field; Stillwater, OK	W 134–0	
October 16		Kendall	Lewis Field; Stillwater, OK (rivalry)	W 13–6	
October 23	4:06 p.m.	Oklahoma Tech	Lewis Field; Stillwater, OK	W 48–0	
October 26		Baylor	Lewis Field; Stillwater, OK	W 60–0	
October 30	3:40 p.m.	Arkansas	Lewis Field; Stillwater, OK	W 46–0	
November 6	3:36 p.m.	at Oklahoma	Boyd Field; Norman, OK (Bedlam)	L 6–28	
November 14		at Rice	West End Park; Houston, TX	T 13–13	
November 17		at Texas A&M	Kyle Field; College Station, TX	L 0–24	
November 26	3:30 p.m.	vs. Colorado Agricultural	Fair Park; Oklahoma City, OK	W 7–0	
