= 1914 Furman Baptists football team =

American college football season

1914 Furman Baptists football
- Conference: Independent
- Record: 2–5
- Head coach: W. B. Bible (1st season)
- Captain: Charles H. Tinsley

1914 Southern college football independents records
	Conf.			Overall
Team	W	L	T	W		L		T
Texas		–		8	–	0	–	0
Middle Tennessee State Normal		–		5	–	0	–	1
Oklahoma		–		9	–	1	–	1
Delaware		–		7	–	1	–	1
Davidson		–		5	–	1	–	1
Birmingham		–		3	–	1	–	1
Georgia Tech		–		6	–	2	–	0
Presbyterian		–		4	–	1	–	1
Oklahoma A&M		–		6	–	2	–	1
Navy		–		6	–	3	–	0
Maryland		–		5	–	3	–	0
Southwestern Louisiana Industrial		–		5	–	3	–	0
Howard (AL)		–		4	–	3	–	1
Maryville (TN)		–		6	–	4	–	0
Sam Houston Normal		–		3	–	2	–	0
Marshall		–		5	–	4	–	0
West Virginia		–		5	–	4	–	0
Rice		–		3	–	2	–	3
North Texas State Normal		–		3	–	3	–	0
South Carolina		–		5	–	5	–	1
VMI		–		4	–	4	–	0
Mississippi Normal		–		2	–	3	–	1
Texas Mines		–		2	–	3	–	0
Western Kentucky State Normal		–		1	–	2	–	0
Baylor		–		3	–	5	–	2
West Tennessee State Normal		–		3	–	5	–	0
Arkansas		–		3	–	6	–	0
Louisiana Industrial		–		2	–	4	–	0
Wake Forest		–		3	–	6	–	0
Furman		–		2	–	5	–	0
Southwest Texas State		–		2	–	6	–	0
Stetson		–		1	–	4	–	0
Louisville		–		1	–	7	–	0
Catholic University		–		0	–	6	–	1

The 1914 Furman Baptists football team represented Furman University as an independent during the 1914 college football season. Led by first-year head coach W. B. Bible, the brother of Dana X. Bible, the Furman compiled a record of 2–5.

== Schedule ==
Date	Opponent	Site	Result	Source
October 10	Wofford	Greenville, SC (rivalry)	W 19–12	
October 17	at Bailey Military Institute	Greenwood, SC	W 57–0	
October 22	Clemson	Greenville, SC	L 0–22	
October 31	at Mercer	Central City Park; Macon, GA	L 0–39	
November 14	Newberry	Greenville, SC	L 6–13	
November 18	at Presbyterian	Clinton, SC	L 2–39	
November 26	Maryville	Greenville, SC	L 19–26	
