= 1914 Marshall Thundering Herd football team =

American college football season

1914 Marshall Thundering Herd football
- Conference: Independent
- Record: 5–4
- Head coach: Boyd Chambers (6th season)
- Captain: Everett "Chief" Lawrence
- Home stadium: Central Field

1914 Southern college football independents records
	Conf.			Overall
Team	W	L	T	W		L		T
Texas		–		8	–	0	–	0
Middle Tennessee State Normal		–		5	–	0	–	1
Oklahoma		–		9	–	1	–	1
Delaware		–		7	–	1	–	1
Davidson		–		5	–	1	–	1
Birmingham		–		3	–	1	–	1
Georgia Tech		–		6	–	2	–	0
Presbyterian		–		4	–	1	–	1
Oklahoma A&M		–		6	–	2	–	1
Navy		–		6	–	3	–	0
Maryland		–		5	–	3	–	0
Southwestern Louisiana Industrial		–		5	–	3	–	0
Howard (AL)		–		4	–	3	–	1
Maryville (TN)		–		6	–	4	–	0
Sam Houston Normal		–		3	–	2	–	0
Marshall		–		5	–	4	–	0
West Virginia		–		5	–	4	–	0
Rice		–		3	–	2	–	3
North Texas State Normal		–		3	–	3	–	0
South Carolina		–		5	–	5	–	1
VMI		–		4	–	4	–	0
Mississippi Normal		–		2	–	3	–	1
Texas Mines		–		2	–	3	–	0
Western Kentucky State Normal		–		1	–	2	–	0
Baylor		–		3	–	5	–	2
West Tennessee State Normal		–		3	–	5	–	0
Arkansas		–		3	–	6	–	0
Louisiana Industrial		–		2	–	4	–	0
Wake Forest		–		3	–	6	–	0
Furman		–		2	–	5	–	0
Southwest Texas State		–		2	–	6	–	0
Stetson		–		1	–	4	–	0
Louisville		–		1	–	7	–	0
Catholic University		–		0	–	6	–	1

The 1914 Marshall Thundering Herd football team represented Marshall College (now Marshall University) as an independent during the 1914 college football season. Marshall posted a 5–4 record, outscoring its opposition 231–133. Home games were played on a campus field called "Central Field" which is presently Campus Commons.

== Schedule ==
Date	Opponent	Site	Result	Source
October 3	at West Virginia	Morgantown, WV (rivalry)	L 0–20	
October 10	at West Virginia Wesleyan	Buckhannon, WV	L 0–34	
October 17	Davis & Elkins	Central Field; Huntington, WV	W 6–0	
October 24	Ohio Northern	Central Field; Huntington, WV	W 7–0	
October 31	Wilmington (OH)	Central Field; Huntington, WV	W 94–0	
November 7	at VPI	Miles Field; Blacksburg, VA	L 6–53	
November 14	at Marietta	Marietta, OH	L 7–20	
November 21	Sandy Valley Seminary	Central Field; Huntington, WV	W 79–0	
November 26	Morris Harvey^{†}	Central Field; Huntington, WV	W 32–6	
^{†}Homecoming
