= 1914 Georgia Tech Yellow Jackets football team =

American college football season

1914 Georgia Tech Yellow Jackets football
- Conference: Independent
- Record: 6–2
- Head coach: John Heisman (11th season)
- Offensive scheme: Jump shift
- Captain: Kendall J. Fielder
- Home stadium: Grant Field

1914 Southern college football independents records
	Conf.			Overall
Team	W	L	T	W		L		T
Texas		–		8	–	0	–	0
Middle Tennessee State Normal		–		5	–	0	–	1
Oklahoma		–		9	–	1	–	1
Delaware		–		7	–	1	–	1
Davidson		–		5	–	1	–	1
Birmingham		–		3	–	1	–	1
Georgia Tech		–		6	–	2	–	0
Presbyterian		–		4	–	1	–	1
Oklahoma A&M		–		6	–	2	–	1
Navy		–		6	–	3	–	0
Maryland		–		5	–	3	–	0
Southwestern Louisiana Industrial		–		5	–	3	–	0
Howard (AL)		–		4	–	3	–	1
Maryville (TN)		–		6	–	4	–	0
Sam Houston Normal		–		3	–	2	–	0
Marshall		–		5	–	4	–	0
West Virginia		–		5	–	4	–	0
Rice		–		3	–	2	–	3
North Texas State Normal		–		3	–	3	–	0
South Carolina		–		5	–	5	–	1
VMI		–		4	–	4	–	0
Mississippi Normal		–		2	–	3	–	1
Texas Mines		–		2	–	3	–	0
Western Kentucky State Normal		–		1	–	2	–	0
Baylor		–		3	–	5	–	2
West Tennessee State Normal		–		3	–	5	–	0
Arkansas		–		3	–	6	–	0
Louisiana Industrial		–		2	–	4	–	0
Wake Forest		–		3	–	6	–	0
Furman		–		2	–	5	–	0
Southwest Texas State		–		2	–	6	–	0
Stetson		–		1	–	4	–	0
Louisville		–		1	–	7	–	0
Catholic University		–		0	–	6	–	1

The 1914 Georgia Tech Yellow Jackets football team represented the Georgia Tech Golden Tornado of the Georgia Institute of Technology during the 1914 college football season. The Tornado was coached by John Heisman in his 11th year as head coach, compiling a record of 6–2. Georgia Tech played its home games at Grant Field.

== Schedule ==
Date	Opponent	Site	Result	Source
October 3	South Carolina	Grant Field; Atlanta, GA	W 20–0	
October 10	Mercer	Grant Field; Atlanta, GA	W 105–0	
October 17	at Alabama	Rickwood Field; Birmingham, AL (rivalry)	L 0–13	
October 24	VMI	Grant Field; Atlanta, GA	W 28–7	
October 31	Sewanee	Grant Field; Atlanta, GA	W 20–0	
November 7	Auburn	Grant Field; Atlanta, GA (rivalry)	L 0–14	
November 14	Georgia	Grant Field; Atlanta, GA (rivalry)	W 7–0	
November 26	Clemson	Grant Field; Atlanta, GA (rivalry)	W 26–6	
