= 1914 South Carolina Gamecocks football team =

American college football season

1914 South Carolina Gamecocks football
- Conference: Independent
- Record: 5–5–1
- Head coach: Norman B. Edgerton (3rd season)
- Captain: Luther Hill
- Home stadium: League Park

1914 Southern college football independents records
	Conf.			Overall
Team	W	L	T	W		L		T
Texas		–		8	–	0	–	0
Middle Tennessee State Normal		–		5	–	0	–	1
Oklahoma		–		9	–	1	–	1
Delaware		–		7	–	1	–	1
Davidson		–		5	–	1	–	1
Birmingham		–		3	–	1	–	1
Georgia Tech		–		6	–	2	–	0
Presbyterian		–		4	–	1	–	1
Oklahoma A&M		–		6	–	2	–	1
Navy		–		6	–	3	–	0
Maryland		–		5	–	3	–	0
Southwestern Louisiana Industrial		–		5	–	3	–	0
Howard (AL)		–		4	–	3	–	1
Maryville (TN)		–		6	–	4	–	0
Sam Houston Normal		–		3	–	2	–	0
Marshall		–		5	–	4	–	0
West Virginia		–		5	–	4	–	0
Rice		–		3	–	2	–	3
North Texas State Normal		–		3	–	3	–	0
South Carolina		–		5	–	5	–	1
VMI		–		4	–	4	–	0
Mississippi Normal		–		2	–	3	–	1
Texas Mines		–		2	–	3	–	0
Western Kentucky State Normal		–		1	–	2	–	0
Baylor		–		3	–	5	–	2
West Tennessee State Normal		–		3	–	5	–	0
Arkansas		–		3	–	6	–	0
Louisiana Industrial		–		2	–	4	–	0
Wake Forest		–		3	–	6	–	0
Furman		–		2	–	5	–	0
Southwest Texas State		–		2	–	6	–	0
Stetson		–		1	–	4	–	0
Louisville		–		1	–	7	–	0
Catholic University		–		0	–	6	–	1

The 1914 South Carolina Gamecocks football team represented the University of South Carolina as an independent during the 1914 college football season. Led by third-year Norman B. Edgerton, the Gamecocks compiled a record of 5–5–1. The team spent the season playing most of their home games at the recently-opened League Park, home of the Columbia Comers, after significant damage from storms damaged Davis Field.

== Schedule ==
Date	Opponent	Site	Result	Source
September 30	Charleston Navy Machinists Mate School	League Park; Columbia, SC	W 30–7	
October 3	at Georgia Tech	Grant Field; Atlanta, GA	L 0–20	
October 12	at North Carolina	Chapel Hill, NC	L 0–48	
October 17	at Virginia	Lambeth Field; Charlottesville, VA	L 7–49	
October 24	Newberry	League Park; Columbia, SC	T 13–13	
October 29	Clemson	State Fairgrounds; Columbia, SC	L 6–29	
November 4	at Wofford	Spartanburg Fairgrounds; Spartanburg, SC	W 25–0	
November 7	Wake Forest	League Park; Columbia, SC	W 26–0	
November 14	Davidson	League Park; Columbia, SC	L 7–13	
November 19	at Newberry	Newberry, SC	W 47–6	
November 26	The Citadel	League Park; Columbia, SC	W 7–6	
