= 1914 Arkansas Razorbacks football team =

American college football season

1914 Arkansas Razorbacks football
- Conference: Independent
- Record: 3–6
- Head coach: Earle T. Pickering (2nd season)
- Captain: James Rudd
- Home stadium: The Hill

1914 Southern college football independents records
	Conf.			Overall
Team	W	L	T	W		L		T
Texas		–		8	–	0	–	0
Middle Tennessee State Normal		–		5	–	0	–	1
Oklahoma		–		9	–	1	–	1
Delaware		–		7	–	1	–	1
Davidson		–		5	–	1	–	1
Birmingham		–		3	–	1	–	1
Georgia Tech		–		6	–	2	–	0
Presbyterian		–		4	–	1	–	1
Oklahoma A&M		–		6	–	2	–	1
Navy		–		6	–	3	–	0
Maryland		–		5	–	3	–	0
Southwestern Louisiana Industrial		–		5	–	3	–	0
Howard (AL)		–		4	–	3	–	1
Maryville (TN)		–		6	–	4	–	0
Sam Houston Normal		–		3	–	2	–	0
Marshall		–		5	–	4	–	0
West Virginia		–		5	–	4	–	0
Rice		–		3	–	2	–	3
North Texas State Normal		–		3	–	3	–	0
South Carolina		–		5	–	5	–	1
VMI		–		4	–	4	–	0
Mississippi Normal		–		2	–	3	–	1
Texas Mines		–		2	–	3	–	0
Western Kentucky State Normal		–		1	–	2	–	0
Baylor		–		3	–	5	–	2
West Tennessee State Normal		–		3	–	5	–	0
Arkansas		–		3	–	6	–	0
Louisiana Industrial		–		2	–	4	–	0
Wake Forest		–		3	–	6	–	0
Furman		–		2	–	5	–	0
Southwest Texas State		–		2	–	6	–	0
Stetson		–		1	–	4	–	0
Louisville		–		1	–	7	–	0
Catholic University		–		0	–	6	–	1

The 1914 Arkansas Razorbacks football team represented the University of Arkansas during the 1914 college football season. Earle T. Pickering was the team's head coach for his second and final season. The Razorbacks compiled a 3–6 record and were outscored by their opponents by a combined total of 202 to 104.

== Schedule ==
Date	Time	Opponent	Site	Result	Attendance	Source
October 3		Hendrix	The Hill; Fayetteville, AR	W 20–13		
October 10		Ouachita	University field; Fayetteville, AR	L 9–15		
October 17		Saint Louis	The Hill; Fayetteville, AR	W 34–0		
October 24		Missouri Mines	The Hill; Fayetteville, AR	L 0–40		
October 30	3:40 p.m.	at Oklahoma A&M	Lewis Field; Stillwater, OK	L 0–46		
November 7		vs. LSU	Fair Grounds; Shreveport, LA (rivalry)	W 20–12		
November 13	2:00 p.m.	Ole Miss	West End Park; Little Rock, AR (rivalry)	L 7–13		
November 20	3:30 p.m.	vs. Oklahoma	Fair Park; Oklahoma City, OK	L 7–35		
November 26		at Drury	Drury Field; Springfield, MO	L 7–28	2,500	

Note: Arkansas states Ole Miss used an ineligible player and consider it to be a forfeit.
