= 1914 Wake Forest Baptists football team =

American college football season

1914 Wake Forest Baptists football
- Conference: Independent
- Record: 3–6
- Head coach: Wilbur C. Smith (1st season)
- Captain: George G. Moore

1914 Southern college football independents records
	Conf.			Overall
Team	W	L	T	W		L		T
Texas		–		8	–	0	–	0
Middle Tennessee State Normal		–		5	–	0	–	1
Oklahoma		–		9	–	1	–	1
Delaware		–		7	–	1	–	1
Davidson		–		5	–	1	–	1
Birmingham		–		3	–	1	–	1
Georgia Tech		–		6	–	2	–	0
Presbyterian		–		4	–	1	–	1
Oklahoma A&M		–		6	–	2	–	1
Navy		–		6	–	3	–	0
Maryland		–		5	–	3	–	0
Southwestern Louisiana Industrial		–		5	–	3	–	0
Howard (AL)		–		4	–	3	–	1
Maryville (TN)		–		6	–	4	–	0
Sam Houston Normal		–		3	–	2	–	0
Marshall		–		5	–	4	–	0
West Virginia		–		5	–	4	–	0
Rice		–		3	–	2	–	3
North Texas State Normal		–		3	–	3	–	0
South Carolina		–		5	–	5	–	1
VMI		–		4	–	4	–	0
Mississippi Normal		–		2	–	3	–	1
Texas Mines		–		2	–	3	–	0
Western Kentucky State Normal		–		1	–	2	–	0
Baylor		–		3	–	5	–	2
West Tennessee State Normal		–		3	–	5	–	0
Arkansas		–		3	–	6	–	0
Louisiana Industrial		–		2	–	4	–	0
Wake Forest		–		3	–	6	–	0
Furman		–		2	–	5	–	0
Southwest Texas State		–		2	–	6	–	0
Stetson		–		1	–	4	–	0
Louisville		–		1	–	7	–	0
Catholic University		–		0	–	6	–	1

The 1914 Wake Forest Baptists football team was an American football team that represented Wake Forest College (now known as Wake Forest University) as an independent during the 1914 college football season. In their first year under head coach Wilbur C. Smith, the team compiled a 3–6 record.

== Schedule ==
Date	Opponent	Site	Result	Source
October 3	at North Carolina A&M	Riddick Stadium; Raleigh, NC (rivalry)	L 0–51	
October 8	vs. North Carolina	Lakewood Park Fairgrounds; Durham, NC (rivalry)	L 0–53	
October 10	USS Franklin	Wake Forest, NC	W 13–0	
October 24	at Washington and Lee	Wilson Field; Lexington, VA	L 0–72	
October 31	Roanoke	Wake Forest, NC	W 19–0	
November 7	at South Carolina	Davis Field; Columbia, SC	L 0–26	
November 14	vs. North Carolina	League Park; Raleigh, NC	L 7–12	
November 26	vs. Davidson	Wearn Field; Charlotte, NC	L 6–7	
December 5	Wofford	Wake Forest, NC	W 41–0	
