= 1914 West Virginia Mountaineers football team =

American college football season

1914 West Virginia Mountaineers football
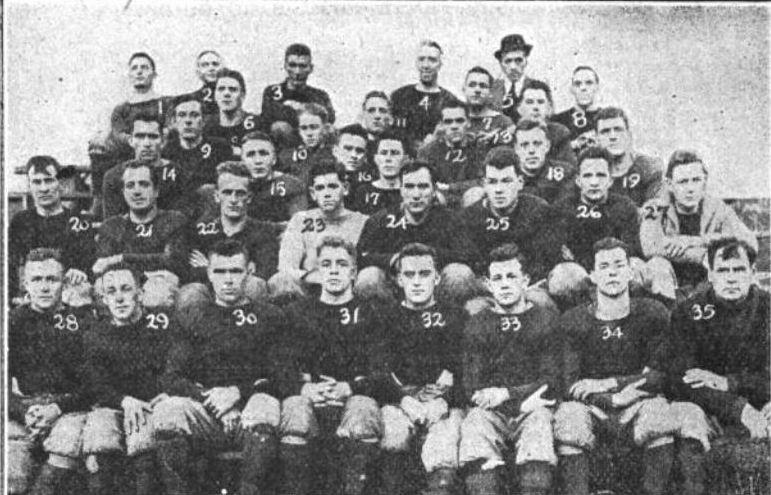
- Conference: Independent
- Record: 5–4
- Head coach: Sol Metzger (1st season)
- Captain: Orrin H. Davis

1914 Southern college football independents records
	Conf.			Overall
Team	W	L	T	W		L		T
Texas		–		8	–	0	–	0
Middle Tennessee State Normal		–		5	–	0	–	1
Oklahoma		–		9	–	1	–	1
Delaware		–		7	–	1	–	1
Davidson		–		5	–	1	–	1
Birmingham		–		3	–	1	–	1
Georgia Tech		–		6	–	2	–	0
Presbyterian		–		4	–	1	–	1
Oklahoma A&M		–		6	–	2	–	1
Navy		–		6	–	3	–	0
Maryland		–		5	–	3	–	0
Southwestern Louisiana Industrial		–		5	–	3	–	0
Howard (AL)		–		4	–	3	–	1
Maryville (TN)		–		6	–	4	–	0
Sam Houston Normal		–		3	–	2	–	0
Marshall		–		5	–	4	–	0
West Virginia		–		5	–	4	–	0
Rice		–		3	–	2	–	3
North Texas State Normal		–		3	–	3	–	0
South Carolina		–		5	–	5	–	1
VMI		–		4	–	4	–	0
Mississippi Normal		–		2	–	3	–	1
Texas Mines		–		2	–	3	–	0
Western Kentucky State Normal		–		1	–	2	–	0
Baylor		–		3	–	5	–	2
West Tennessee State Normal		–		3	–	5	–	0
Arkansas		–		3	–	6	–	0
Louisiana Industrial		–		2	–	4	–	0
Wake Forest		–		3	–	6	–	0
Furman		–		2	–	5	–	0
Southwest Texas State		–		2	–	6	–	0
Stetson		–		1	–	4	–	0
Louisville		–		1	–	7	–	0
Catholic University		–		0	–	6	–	1

The 1914 West Virginia Mountaineers football team was an American football team that represented West Virginia University as an independent during the 1914 college football season. In its first season under head coach Sol Metzger, the team compiled a 5–4 record and outscored opponents by a total of 159 to 96. Orrin H. Davis was the team captain.

== Schedule ==
Date	Time	Opponent	Site	Result	Source
October 3		Marshall	Morgantown, WV (rivalry)	W 20–0	
October 10		Bethany (WV)	Morgantown, WV	W 13–0	
October 17		Duquesne	Morgantown, WV	W 37–0	
October 22	3:00 p.m.	at North Carolina A&M	Riddick Stadium; Raleigh, NC	L 13–26	
October 31		at Washington & Jefferson	Washington, PA	L 0–48	
November 7		Davis & Elkins	Morgantown, WV	W 55–0	
November 14		vs. Washington and Lee	Charleston, WV	L 6–8	
November 21		vs. Marietta	Clarksburg, WV	W 6–0	
November 26		vs. West Virginia Wesleyan	South Side Park; Fairmont, WV	L 9–14	
