= 1914 Davidson football team =

American college football season

1914 Davidson football
- Conference: Independent
- Record: 5–1–1
- Head coach: Bob Fetzer (1st season)
- Home stadium: Sprunt Athletic Field

1914 Southern college football independents records
	Conf.			Overall
Team	W	L	T	W		L		T
Texas		–		8	–	0	–	0
Middle Tennessee State Normal		–		5	–	0	–	1
Oklahoma		–		9	–	1	–	1
Delaware		–		7	–	1	–	1
Davidson		–		5	–	1	–	1
Birmingham		–		3	–	1	–	1
Georgia Tech		–		6	–	2	–	0
Presbyterian		–		4	–	1	–	1
Oklahoma A&M		–		6	–	2	–	1
Navy		–		6	–	3	–	0
Maryland		–		5	–	3	–	0
Southwestern Louisiana Industrial		–		5	–	3	–	0
Howard (AL)		–		4	–	3	–	1
Maryville (TN)		–		6	–	4	–	0
Sam Houston Normal		–		3	–	2	–	0
Marshall		–		5	–	4	–	0
West Virginia		–		5	–	4	–	0
Rice		–		3	–	2	–	3
North Texas State Normal		–		3	–	3	–	0
South Carolina		–		5	–	5	–	1
VMI		–		4	–	4	–	0
Mississippi Normal		–		2	–	3	–	1
Texas Mines		–		2	–	3	–	0
Western Kentucky State Normal		–		1	–	2	–	0
Baylor		–		3	–	5	–	2
West Tennessee State Normal		–		3	–	5	–	0
Arkansas		–		3	–	6	–	0
Louisiana Industrial		–		2	–	4	–	0
Wake Forest		–		3	–	6	–	0
Furman		–		2	–	5	–	0
Southwest Texas State		–		2	–	6	–	0
Stetson		–		1	–	4	–	0
Louisville		–		1	–	7	–	0
Catholic University		–		0	–	6	–	1

The 1914 Davidson football team was an American football team that represented the Davidson College as an independent during the 1914 college football season. In their first year under head coach Bob Fetzer, the team compiled a 5–1–1 record.

== Schedule ==
Date	Opponent	Site	Result	Source
October 3	Clemson	Sprunt Athletic Field; Davidson, NC	T 0–0	
October 10	Newberry	Sprunt Athletic Field; Davidson, NC	W 22–7	
October 17	at Wofford	Spartanburg, SC	W 86–6	
October 24	vs. The Citadel	Wearn Field; Charlotte, NC	W 16–0	
October 31	vs. North Carolina	Prince Albert Park; Winston-Salem, NC	L 3–16	
November 14	at South Carolina	Davis Field; Columbia, SC	W 13–7	
November 26	vs. Wake Forest	Wearn Field; Charlotte, NC	W 7–6	
