= 1914 Louisiana Industrial football team =

American college football season

1914 Louisiana Industrial football
- Conference: Independent
- Record: 2–4
- Head coach: Percy S. Prince (6th season)

1914 Southern college football independents records
	Conf.			Overall
Team	W	L	T	W		L		T
Texas		–		8	–	0	–	0
Middle Tennessee State Normal		–		5	–	0	–	1
Oklahoma		–		9	–	1	–	1
Delaware		–		7	–	1	–	1
Davidson		–		5	–	1	–	1
Birmingham		–		3	–	1	–	1
Georgia Tech		–		6	–	2	–	0
Presbyterian		–		4	–	1	–	1
Oklahoma A&M		–		6	–	2	–	1
Navy		–		6	–	3	–	0
Maryland		–		5	–	3	–	0
Southwestern Louisiana Industrial		–		5	–	3	–	0
Howard (AL)		–		4	–	3	–	1
Maryville (TN)		–		6	–	4	–	0
Sam Houston Normal		–		3	–	2	–	0
Marshall		–		5	–	4	–	0
West Virginia		–		5	–	4	–	0
Rice		–		3	–	2	–	3
North Texas State Normal		–		3	–	3	–	0
South Carolina		–		5	–	5	–	1
VMI		–		4	–	4	–	0
Mississippi Normal		–		2	–	3	–	1
Texas Mines		–		2	–	3	–	0
Western Kentucky State Normal		–		1	–	2	–	0
Baylor		–		3	–	5	–	2
West Tennessee State Normal		–		3	–	5	–	0
Arkansas		–		3	–	6	–	0
Louisiana Industrial		–		2	–	4	–	0
Wake Forest		–		3	–	6	–	0
Furman		–		2	–	5	–	0
Southwest Texas State		–		2	–	6	–	0
Stetson		–		1	–	4	–	0
Louisville		–		1	–	7	–	0
Catholic University		–		0	–	6	–	1

The 1914 Louisiana Industrial football team was an American football team that represented the Louisiana Industrial Institute—now known as Louisiana Tech University—as an independent during the 1914 college football season. Led by sixth-year head coach Percy S. Prince, Louisiana Industrial compiled a record of 2–4.

== Schedule ==
Date	Time	Opponent	Site	Result	Source
October 3		at LSU	State Field; Baton Rouge, LA	L 0–60	
October 9		Hendrix	Ruston, LA	L 0–20	
October 17	3:00 p.m.	Centenary	Ruston, LA	W 33–7	
October 31		vs. Mississippi College	Mississippi State Fairgrounds; Jackson, MS	L 8–38	
November 7		at Centenary	State Fair Grounds; Shreveport, LA	W 14–0	
		Henderson Brown	Ruston, LA	L 0–28	
All times are in Central time
