= 1914 Maryville Scots football team =

American college football season

1914 Maryville Scots football
- Conference: Independent
- Record: 6–4
- Head coach: Z. J. Stanley (1st season)
- Captain: Tom Goddard

1914 Southern college football independents records
	Conf.			Overall
Team	W	L	T	W		L		T
Texas		–		8	–	0	–	0
Middle Tennessee State Normal		–		5	–	0	–	1
Oklahoma		–		9	–	1	–	1
Delaware		–		7	–	1	–	1
Davidson		–		5	–	1	–	1
Birmingham		–		3	–	1	–	1
Georgia Tech		–		6	–	2	–	0
Presbyterian		–		4	–	1	–	1
Oklahoma A&M		–		6	–	2	–	1
Navy		–		6	–	3	–	0
Maryland		–		5	–	3	–	0
Southwestern Louisiana Industrial		–		5	–	3	–	0
Howard (AL)		–		4	–	3	–	1
Maryville (TN)		–		6	–	4	–	0
Sam Houston Normal		–		3	–	2	–	0
Marshall		–		5	–	4	–	0
West Virginia		–		5	–	4	–	0
Rice		–		3	–	2	–	3
North Texas State Normal		–		3	–	3	–	0
South Carolina		–		5	–	5	–	1
VMI		–		4	–	4	–	0
Mississippi Normal		–		2	–	3	–	1
Texas Mines		–		2	–	3	–	0
Western Kentucky State Normal		–		1	–	2	–	0
Baylor		–		3	–	5	–	2
West Tennessee State Normal		–		3	–	5	–	0
Arkansas		–		3	–	6	–	0
Louisiana Industrial		–		2	–	4	–	0
Wake Forest		–		3	–	6	–	0
Furman		–		2	–	5	–	0
Southwest Texas State		–		2	–	6	–	0
Stetson		–		1	–	4	–	0
Louisville		–		1	–	7	–	0
Catholic University		–		0	–	6	–	1

The 1914 Maryville Scots football team represented the Maryville College during the 1914 college football season.

== Schedule ==
Date	Opponent	Site	Result	Source
September 25	Central High School	Maryville, TN	W 77–7	
October 3	at Kentucky	Stoll Field; Lexington, KY	L 0–80	
October 5	at Transylvania	Lexington, KY	L 0–66	
October 10	at Chattanooga	Chamberlain Field; Chattanooga, TN	L 7–35	
October 17	Athens	Maryville, TN	W 97–0	
October 29	King	Maryville, TN	W 13–0	
November 2	Mars Hill	Maryville, TN	W 67–0	
November 14	at Tusculum	Greeneville, TN	W 7–6	
November 21	Carson–Newman	Maryville, TN	L 0–3	
November 26	at Furman	Greenville, SC	W 26–19	
