= 1914 Southwestern Louisiana Industrial football team =

American college football season

1914 Southwestern Louisiana Industrial football
- Conference: Independent
- Record: 5–3
- Head coach: Richard B. Dunbar (1st season)
- Home stadium: Campus Athletic Field

1914 Southern college football independents records
	Conf.			Overall
Team	W	L	T	W		L		T
Texas		–		8	–	0	–	0
Middle Tennessee State Normal		–		5	–	0	–	1
Oklahoma		–		9	–	1	–	1
Delaware		–		7	–	1	–	1
Davidson		–		5	–	1	–	1
Birmingham		–		3	–	1	–	1
Georgia Tech		–		6	–	2	–	0
Presbyterian		–		4	–	1	–	1
Oklahoma A&M		–		6	–	2	–	1
Navy		–		6	–	3	–	0
Maryland		–		5	–	3	–	0
Southwestern Louisiana Industrial		–		5	–	3	–	0
Howard (AL)		–		4	–	3	–	1
Maryville (TN)		–		6	–	4	–	0
Sam Houston Normal		–		3	–	2	–	0
Marshall		–		5	–	4	–	0
West Virginia		–		5	–	4	–	0
Rice		–		3	–	2	–	3
North Texas State Normal		–		3	–	3	–	0
South Carolina		–		5	–	5	–	1
VMI		–		4	–	4	–	0
Mississippi Normal		–		2	–	3	–	1
Texas Mines		–		2	–	3	–	0
Western Kentucky State Normal		–		1	–	2	–	0
Baylor		–		3	–	5	–	2
West Tennessee State Normal		–		3	–	5	–	0
Arkansas		–		3	–	6	–	0
Louisiana Industrial		–		2	–	4	–	0
Wake Forest		–		3	–	6	–	0
Furman		–		2	–	5	–	0
Southwest Texas State		–		2	–	6	–	0
Stetson		–		1	–	4	–	0
Louisville		–		1	–	7	–	0
Catholic University		–		0	–	6	–	1

The 1914 Southwestern Louisiana Industrial football team was an American football team that represented the Southwestern Louisiana Industrial Institute (now known as the University of Louisiana at Lafayette) as an independent during the 1914 college football season. In their first year under head coach Richard B. Dunbar, the team compiled a 5–3 record.

== Schedule ==
Date	Opponent	Site	Result	Source
September 26	at LSU	State Field; Baton Rouge, LA	L 0–54	
	LSU JV		L 7–13	
October 17	at Tulane	Tulane Stadium; New Orleans, LA	L 0–33	
October 24	at Louisiana College	Pineville, LA	W 45–0	
October 31	St. Charles College (LA)	Campus Athletic Field; Lafayette, LA	W 20–0	
November 7	Louisiana College	Campus Athletic Field; Lafayette, LA	W 89–0	
November 17	at St. Charles College (LA)	Grand Coteau, LA	W 26–7	
November 26	Louisiana Normal	Campus Athletic Field; Lafayette, LA	W 12–0	
