= 1914 Maryland Aggies football team =

American college football season

1914 Maryland Aggies football
- Conference: Independent
- Record: 5–3
- Head coach: Curley Byrd (4th season)

1914 Southern college football independents records
	Conf.			Overall
Team	W	L	T	W		L		T
Texas		–		8	–	0	–	0
Middle Tennessee State Normal		–		5	–	0	–	1
Oklahoma		–		9	–	1	–	1
Delaware		–		7	–	1	–	1
Davidson		–		5	–	1	–	1
Birmingham		–		3	–	1	–	1
Georgia Tech		–		6	–	2	–	0
Presbyterian		–		4	–	1	–	1
Oklahoma A&M		–		6	–	2	–	1
Navy		–		6	–	3	–	0
Maryland		–		5	–	3	–	0
Southwestern Louisiana Industrial		–		5	–	3	–	0
Howard (AL)		–		4	–	3	–	1
Maryville (TN)		–		6	–	4	–	0
Sam Houston Normal		–		3	–	2	–	0
Marshall		–		5	–	4	–	0
West Virginia		–		5	–	4	–	0
Rice		–		3	–	2	–	3
North Texas State Normal		–		3	–	3	–	0
South Carolina		–		5	–	5	–	1
VMI		–		4	–	4	–	0
Mississippi Normal		–		2	–	3	–	1
Texas Mines		–		2	–	3	–	0
Western Kentucky State Normal		–		1	–	2	–	0
Baylor		–		3	–	5	–	2
West Tennessee State Normal		–		3	–	5	–	0
Arkansas		–		3	–	6	–	0
Louisiana Industrial		–		2	–	4	–	0
Wake Forest		–		3	–	6	–	0
Furman		–		2	–	5	–	0
Southwest Texas State		–		2	–	6	–	0
Stetson		–		1	–	4	–	0
Louisville		–		1	–	7	–	0
Catholic University		–		0	–	6	–	1

The 1914 Maryland Aggies football team represented Maryland Agricultural College (which became Maryland State College in 1916 and part of the University of Maryland in 1920) in the 1914 college football season. In their fourth season under head coach Curley Byrd, the Aggies compiled a 5–3 record and outscored all opponents, 72 to 49. The team's three losses were to Baltimore Polytechnic Institute (0–6), McDaniel College (13–20), and Gallaudet University (0–23).

== Schedule ==
Date	Opponent	Site	Result	Source
September 26	Baltimore Polytechnic Institute	College Park, MD	L 0–7	
October 3	at Catholic University	Washington, DC	W 6–0	
October 10	at Western Maryland	Westminster, MD	L 13–20	
October 24	at Johns Hopkins	Homewood Field; Baltimore, MD	W 14–0	
October 27	at St. John's (MD)	Annapolis, MD	W 10–0	
November 6	at Washington College	Chestertown, MD	W 3–0	
November 21	at Gallaudet	Kendall Green; Washington, DC	L 0–23	
November 26	at Pennsylvania Military	Chester, PA	W 26–0	
