= 1914 VMI Keydets football team =

American college football season

1914 VMI Keydets football
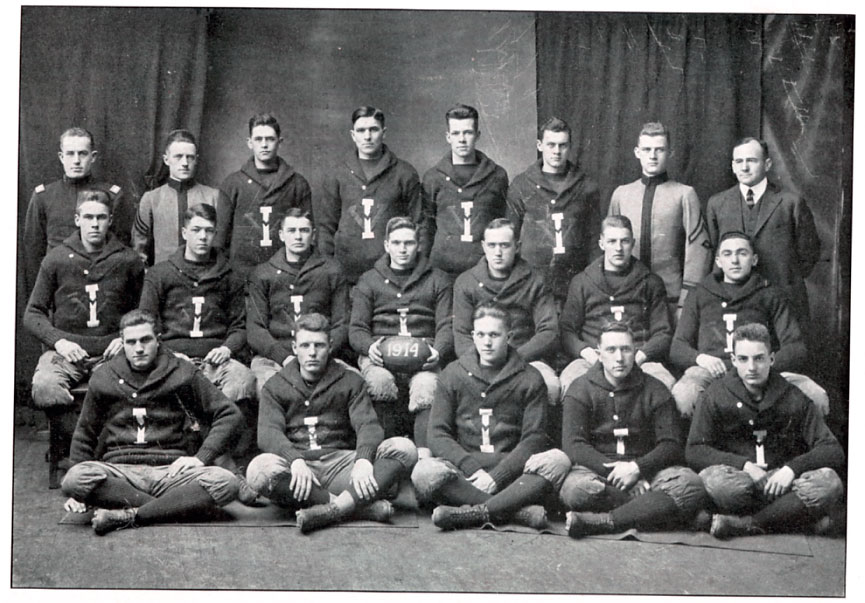
- Conference: Independent
- Record: 4–4
- Head coach: Frank Gorton (1st season)

1914 Southern college football independents records
	Conf.			Overall
Team	W	L	T	W		L		T
Texas		–		8	–	0	–	0
Middle Tennessee State Normal		–		5	–	0	–	1
Oklahoma		–		9	–	1	–	1
Delaware		–		7	–	1	–	1
Davidson		–		5	–	1	–	1
Birmingham		–		3	–	1	–	1
Georgia Tech		–		6	–	2	–	0
Presbyterian		–		4	–	1	–	1
Oklahoma A&M		–		6	–	2	–	1
Navy		–		6	–	3	–	0
Maryland		–		5	–	3	–	0
Southwestern Louisiana Industrial		–		5	–	3	–	0
Howard (AL)		–		4	–	3	–	1
Maryville (TN)		–		6	–	4	–	0
Sam Houston Normal		–		3	–	2	–	0
Marshall		–		5	–	4	–	0
West Virginia		–		5	–	4	–	0
Rice		–		3	–	2	–	3
North Texas State Normal		–		3	–	3	–	0
South Carolina		–		5	–	5	–	1
VMI		–		4	–	4	–	0
Mississippi Normal		–		2	–	3	–	1
Texas Mines		–		2	–	3	–	0
Western Kentucky State Normal		–		1	–	2	–	0
Baylor		–		3	–	5	–	2
West Tennessee State Normal		–		3	–	5	–	0
Arkansas		–		3	–	6	–	0
Louisiana Industrial		–		2	–	4	–	0
Wake Forest		–		3	–	6	–	0
Furman		–		2	–	5	–	0
Southwest Texas State		–		2	–	6	–	0
Stetson		–		1	–	4	–	0
Louisville		–		1	–	7	–	0
Catholic University		–		0	–	6	–	1

The 1914 VMI Keydets football team represented the Virginia Military Institute in their 24th season of organized football. Under head coach Frank Gorton, the Keydets held a 4–4 record.

== Schedule ==
Date	Time	Opponent	Site	Result	Attendance
September 26		Hampden–Sydney	VMI Parade Ground; Lexington, VA	W 29–7	
October 3		Richmond	VMI Parade Ground; Lexington, VA	W 10–0	
October 10		William & Mary	VMI Parade Ground; Lexington, VA (rivalry)	W 38–0	
October 17		Gaullaudet	VMI Parade Ground; Lexington, VA	W 6–0	
October 24		at Georgia Tech	Grant Field; Atlanta, GA	L 7–28	
November 7		vs. North Carolina	Weams Field; Charlotte, NC	L 7–30	
November 14		vs. Clemson	Broad Street Park; Richmond, VA	L 23–27	
November 26	3:00pm	vs. VPI	Roanoke Fair Grounds; Roanoke, VA (rivalry)	L 0–3	5,000
