= Rus Lindsay =

American football and baseball player (1891–1977)

No. 11
- Position: Fullback

Personal information
- Born: February 17, 1891; Knoxville, Tennessee, U.S.
- Died: March 2, 1977 (aged 86)
- Listed weight: 160 lb (73 kg)

Career information
- High school: Baker-Himel
- College: Tennessee (1913–1916)

Awards and highlights
- SIAA championship (1914); All-Southern (1914)

Robert Medaris "Rus" Lindsay (February 17, 1891 – March 2, 1977) was an American college football and college baseball player for the Tennessee Volunteers of the University of Tennessee and a member of the Tennessee Kappa chapter of Sigma Alpha Epsilon.

== University of Tennessee ==
He is the namesake of Robert M. Lindsay Field at Lindsey Nelson Stadium, where Tennessee plays baseball.

=== Football ===
Lindsay was a prominent fullback for the Tennessee Volunteers football team.

==== 1914 ====
He was a member of the Southern Intercollegiate Athletic Association champion 1914 team, selected All-Southern. It was the first championship of any kind for the Tennessee program. Winning all nine of their games, the 1914 squad was only the second undefeated team in Tennessee history. The 1914 Vols were retroactively awarded a national championship by 1st-N-Goal, though this remains largely unrecognized. A description of the 14 to 7 win over Sewanee in 1914 read, "Lindsay, as usual, ploughed through the opposing line for consistent gains, and when it was absolutely necessary that Tennessee gain a certain number of yards 'Russ' was sure to be called upon."

=== Baseball ===
He was an All-Southern baseball player as well.
