= 1914 Tennessee Volunteers football team =

American college football season

1914 Tennessee Volunteers football

SIAA co-champion
- Conference: Southern Intercollegiate Athletic Association
- Record: 9–0 (6–0 SIAA)
- Head coach: Zora Clevenger (4th season)
- Offensive scheme: Straight T
- Base defense: Multiple
- Captain: Farmer Kelly
- Home stadium: Waite Field

Uniform
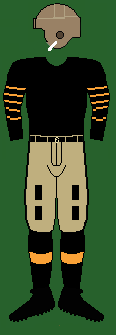

1914 Southern Intercollegiate Athletic Association football standings
	Conf.					Overall
Team	W		L		T	W		L		T
Tennessee +	6	–	0	–	0	9	–	0	–	0
Auburn +	4	–	0	–	1	8	–	0	–	1
Texas A&M	2	–	0	–	0	6	–	1	–	1
Ole Miss	2	–	1	–	1	5	–	4	–	1
Mississippi A&M	4	–	2	–	0	6	–	2	–	0
Sewanee	4	–	2	–	0	5	–	3	–	0
Florida	3	–	2	–	0	5	–	2	–	0
Georgia	2	–	2	–	1	3	–	5	–	1
Clemson	2	–	2	–	0	5	–	3	–	1
Alabama	3	–	3	–	0	5	–	4	–	0
Kentucky	1	–	1	–	0	5	–	3	–	0
LSU	1	–	2	–	1	4	–	4	–	1
Chattanooga	1	–	3	–	0	5	–	4	–	0
Vanderbilt	1	–	3	–	0	2	–	6	–	0
Mississippi College	0	–	1	–	1	4	–	3	–	1
Wofford	0	–	1	–	0	1	–	7	–	1
Central University	0	–	1	–	0	1	–	3	–	1
Mercer	0	–	3	–	0	5	–	4	–	0
Tulane	0	–	3	–	1	3	–	3	–	1
The Citadel	0	–	3	–	0	2	–	5	–	0
+ – Conference co-champions

The 1914 Tennessee Volunteers football team represented the University of Tennessee in the 1914 Southern Intercollegiate Athletic Association football season. The team won the Southern Intercollegiate Athletic Association, the first championship of any kind for the Tennessee program. Winning all nine of their games, the 1914 squad was only the second undefeated team in Tennessee history. The 1914 Vols were retroactively awarded a national championship by 1st-N-Goal, though this remains largely unrecognized.

== Before the season ==
In 1913, the Volunteers had a winning record for the first time since 1908 and won their first Southern Intercollegiate Athletic Association game since 1910. The team lost captain Sam Hayley.

Miller Pontius assisted coach Clevenger.

== Schedule ==
Date	Opponent	Site	Result	Source
September 26	Carson–Newman*	Waite Field; Knoxville, TN	W 89–0	
October 3	King (TN)*	Waite Field; Knoxville, TN	W 55–3	
October 10	Clemson	Waite Field; Knoxville, TN	W 27–0	
October 17	at Louisville*	Eclipse Park; Louisville, KY	W 66–0	
October 24	Alabama	Waite Field; Knoxville, TN (rivalry)	W 17–7	
October 31	Chattanooga	Waite Field; Knoxville, TN	W 67–0	
November 7	at Vanderbilt	Dudley Field; Nashville, TN (rivalry)	W 16–14	
November 14	vs. Sewanee	Andrews Field; Chattanooga, TN	W 14–7	
November 26	Kentucky	Waite Field; Knoxville, TN (rivalry)	W 23–6	
*Non-conference game

== Game summaries ==
=== Carson–Newman ===
To open the season, Carson–Newman was swamped 89–0.

=== King ===
King College was defeated almost as easily as Carson-Newman, 55–3.

=== Clemson ===
The Volunteers beat Clemson 27–0. Tennessee scored twice on forward passes, and Clemson tried several passes but none were successful. The starting lineup was Carroll (left end), G. Vowell (left tackle), Taylor (left guard), McLean (center), Kerr (right guard), Kelly (right tackle), Greenwood (right end), May (quarterback), Thomason (left halfback), Rainey (right halfback), Lindsay (fullback).

=== Louisville ===
Tennessee's backfield starred in the 66–0 defeat of Louisville. The starting lineup was Carroll (left end), G. Vowell (left tackle), Kerr (left guard), McLean (center), Taylor (right guard), Kelly (right tackle), Sorrells (right end), May (quarterback), Thomason (left halfback), Rainey (right halfback), Lindsay (fullback).

=== Alabama ===
Alabama quarterback Charlie Joplin was ruled ineligible by the SIAA for refusing to sign an affidavit that he had not played professional baseball, and Tennessee halfback Red Rainey was out with injury. Tennessee won 17–7. The first score came on a 40-yard pass from Bill May to Scotty Cameron. A 22-yard pass to Goat Carroll got the next score. Alabama's score came in the second period, when Bully Van de Graaff picked up a Farmer Kelly fumble and ran 50 yards for a touchdown. Cameron kicked a field goal to make it 17.

The starting lineup was Carroll (left end), Bayer (left tackle), Kerr (left guard), McLean (center), Taylor (right guard), Kelly (right tackle), G. Vowell (right end), May (quarterback), Thomason (left halfback), Cameron (right halfback), Lindsay (fullback).

=== Chattanooga ===
The Vols beat Chattanooga 67–0.

=== Vanderbilt ===
Bill May threw two touchdown passes to Goat Carroll in the 16–14 victory over Vanderbilt, the first ever victory over the Tennessee rival. Carroll scored all of the Vols points, adding a field goal in between touchdowns. Irby Curry scored all of Vanderbilt's points. An account of the first Tennessee touchdown reads, "Four minutes of play had barely drifted by when Tennessee's weird, mystic, elusive forward pass, May to Carroll, deadly in accuracy, went sailing home for the first touchdown of the game. The chesty Tennessee quarterback sent the oval whizzing for a distance of thirty-five yards and Carroll gathered in the ball near his goal line, when he hurried beneath the posts with all the speed at his command."

=== Sewanee ===
A description of the 14–7 win over Sewanee in Chattanooga read, "Mush Kerr played a wonderful game in the line as did Capt. Kelly. The work of the Tennessee line was easily the feature of the contest, and Sewanee early discovered that it was practically useless to rely on line plunges to gain ground...Lindsay, as usual, ploughed through the opposing line for consistent gains, and when it was absolutely necessary that Tennessee gain a certain number of yards 'Russ' was sure to be called upon." Lee Tolley starred for Sewanee, which had been coached to break-up the forward pass.

=== Kentucky ===
The Kentucky Wildcats were outweighed 15 pounds to the man and beaten 23–6. Graham Vowell scored three touchdowns.

The starting lineup was Carroll (left end), Bayer (left tackle), Kerr (left guard), McLean (center), Taylor (right guard), Kelly (right tackle), G. Vowell (right end), May (quarterback), Thomason (left halfback), Rainey (right halfback), Lindsay (fullback).

== Personnel ==
=== Depth chart ===
The following chart provides a visual depiction of Tennessee's lineup during the 1914 season with games started at the position reflected in parentheses. The chart mimics a T Formation.

LE
Goat Carroll (5)
Lloyd Wolfe (0)

LT	LG	C	RG	RT
S. D. Bayer (2)	Mush Kerr (3)	Evan McLean (4)	Bob Taylor (3)	Farmer Kelly (5)
Graham Vowell (2)	Bob Taylor (1)		Mush Kerr (1)	Clifton Cates (0)
Morris Vowell (0)	Chink Lowe (0)			

RE
Graham Vowell (2)
B. J. Greenwood (1)
Frank Sorrels (1)

QB
Bill May (5)
Red Rainey (0)

LHB	FB	RHB
Tommy Thomason (4)	Rus Lindsay (4)	Red Rainey (3)
P. H. Callahan (0)		Scotty Cameron (1)

-

=== Roster ===
==== Line ====
Number	Player	Position	Games started	Hometown	Prep school	Height	Weight	Age
12	S. D. Bayer	tackle					190	
8	Goat Carroll	end		Nashville, Tennessee	Wallace University School		174	
18	Clifton Cates	tackle						
15	B. J. Greenwood	end						
13	Farmer Kelly	tackle		Orlinda, Tennessee	Peoples and Tucker School	6'1"	200	25
2	Mush Kerr	guard		Savannah, Tennessee	Savannah Institute		186	
20	Chink Lowe	guard						
4	Evan McLean	center					170	
14	Frank Sorrels	end						
3	Bob Taylor	guard					183	
6	Graham Vowell	tackle		Martin, Tennessee			181	
16	Morris Vowell	tackle		Martin, Tennessee				
19	Lloyd Wolfe	end						

==== Backfield ====
Number	Player	Position	Games started	Hometown	Prep school	Height	Weight	Age
5	Bill May	quarterback					140	
9	Scotty Cameron	halfback					142	
7	Red Rainey	halfback					154	
10	Tommy Thomason	halfback						
1	P. H. Callahan	halfback						
11	Rus Lindsay	fullback		Knoxville, Tennessee	Baker-Himel		155	

==== Unlisted ====
Number	Player
17	Malcolm McSpadden

== Postseason ==
=== Championships ===
The Birmingham Newspaper Club awarded Tennessee the Southern championship cup.

=== Awards and honors ===
Alonzo Carroll, Farmer Kelly, Mush Kerr, and Rus Lindsay made All-Southern.
