= 1914 Sewanee Tigers football team =

American college football season

1914 Sewanee Tigers football
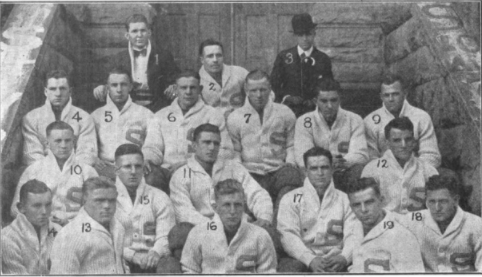
- Conference: Southern Intercollegiate Athletic Association
- Record: 5–3 (4–2 SIAA)
- Head coach: Harris G. Cope (6th season)
- Captain: Lee Tolley
- Home stadium: Hardee Field

Uniform
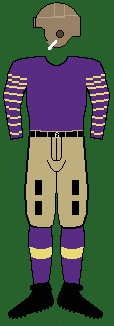

1914 Southern Intercollegiate Athletic Association football standings
	Conf.					Overall
Team	W		L		T	W		L		T
Tennessee +	6	–	0	–	0	9	–	0	–	0
Auburn +	4	–	0	–	1	8	–	0	–	1
Texas A&M	2	–	0	–	0	6	–	1	–	1
Ole Miss	2	–	1	–	1	5	–	4	–	1
Mississippi A&M	4	–	2	–	0	6	–	2	–	0
Sewanee	4	–	2	–	0	5	–	3	–	0
Florida	3	–	2	–	0	5	–	2	–	0
Georgia	2	–	2	–	1	3	–	5	–	1
Clemson	2	–	2	–	0	5	–	3	–	1
Alabama	3	–	3	–	0	5	–	4	–	0
Kentucky	1	–	1	–	0	5	–	3	–	0
LSU	1	–	2	–	1	4	–	4	–	1
Chattanooga	1	–	3	–	0	5	–	4	–	0
Vanderbilt	1	–	3	–	0	2	–	6	–	0
Mississippi College	0	–	1	–	1	4	–	3	–	1
Wofford	0	–	1	–	0	1	–	7	–	1
Central University	0	–	1	–	0	1	–	3	–	1
Mercer	0	–	3	–	0	5	–	4	–	0
Tulane	0	–	3	–	1	3	–	3	–	1
The Citadel	0	–	3	–	0	2	–	5	–	0
+ – Conference co-champions

The 1914 Sewanee Tigers football team represented the Sewanee Tigers of Sewanee: The University of the South during the 1914 Southern Intercollegiate Athletic Association football season.

== Before the season ==
Coach Harris Cope was assisted by several former Sewanee greats, such as Henry D. Phillips and Frank Juhan and Silas Williams and George Watkins.

== Schedule ==
Date	Opponent	Site	Result	Source
October 3	Cumberland (TN)*	Hardee Field; Sewanee, TN	W 59–0	
October 10	Georgia	Hardee Field; Sewanee, TN	L 6–7	
October 17	Chattanooga	Hardee Field; Sewanee, TN	W 46–3	
October 24	at Florida	Barrs Field; Jacksonville, FL	W 26–0	
October 31	at Georgia Tech*	Grant Field; Atlanta, GA	L 0–20	
November 7	at Alabama	Rickwood Field; Birmingham, AL	W 18–0	
November 14	vs. Tennessee	Andrews Field; Chattanooga, TN	L 7–14	
November 26	at Vanderbilt	Dudley Field; Nashville, TN (rivalry)	W 14–13	
*Non-conference game

== Game summaries ==
=== Cumberland ===
Lee Tolley was a part of the longest kick return in school history, a 90-yard run against Cumberland.

=== Georgia ===
All-American David Paddock and Georgia defeated Sewanee 7–6. It was Sewanee's first home loss since their very first game.

=== Chattanooga ===
Chattanooga was beaten 46–3.

=== Florida ===
Sewanee at Florida

Team	1	2	3	4	Total
• Sewanee	13	7	0	6	26
Florida	0	0	0	0	0

- Date: October 24
- Location: Barrs Field
  Jacksonville, Florida
- Referee: Pee Wee Forsythe

The Tigers shutout Florida 26–0. Florida was outplayed in the first half. In the final period, Tolley had an 85-yard touchdown run.

=== Georgia Tech ===
John Heisman's Georgia Tech team beat Sewanee 20–0.

=== Alabama ===
Alabama was defeated 18–0. Tolley was a part of the first triple-pass in Sewanee history.

=== Tennessee ===
An account of the Tennessee game reads "Lindsay, as usual, ploughed through the opposing line for consistent gains, and when it was absolutely necessary that Tennessee gain a certain number of yards 'Russ' was sure to be called upon...Mush Kerr played a wonderful game in the line as did Capt. Kelly. The work of the Tennessee line was easily the feature of the contest, and Sewanee early discovered that it was practically useless to rely on line plunges to gain ground."

=== Vanderbilt ===
Sewanee beat rival Vanderbilt for the first time since the championship year of 1909, 14–13. Tolley had a 75-yard touchdown run, and was awarded with a gold fob for the victory. One account reads "For brilliance and beauty of execution, (Tolley's play) has had few equals, if any, in the South, and the Tiger leader retires from the game as the premier quarterback in the S.I.A.A., beyond a doubt." His performance included a 75-yard punt return for a touchdown.
