= 1914 Georgia Bulldogs football team =

American college football season

1914 Georgia Bulldogs football
- Conference: Southern Intercollegiate Athletic Association
- Record: 3–5–1 (2–2–1 SIAA)
- Head coach: W. A. Cunningham (5th season)
- Captain: David Paddock
- Home stadium: Sanford Field

Uniform
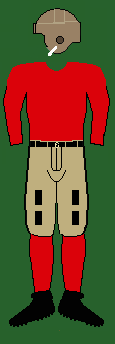

1914 Southern Intercollegiate Athletic Association football standings
	Conf.					Overall
Team	W		L		T	W		L		T
Tennessee +	6	–	0	–	0	9	–	0	–	0
Auburn +	4	–	0	–	1	8	–	0	–	1
Texas A&M	2	–	0	–	0	6	–	1	–	1
Ole Miss	2	–	1	–	1	5	–	4	–	1
Mississippi A&M	4	–	2	–	0	6	–	2	–	0
Sewanee	4	–	2	–	0	5	–	3	–	0
Florida	3	–	2	–	0	5	–	2	–	0
Georgia	2	–	2	–	1	3	–	5	–	1
Clemson	2	–	2	–	0	5	–	3	–	1
Alabama	3	–	3	–	0	5	–	4	–	0
Kentucky	1	–	1	–	0	5	–	3	–	0
LSU	1	–	2	–	1	4	–	4	–	1
Chattanooga	1	–	3	–	0	5	–	4	–	0
Vanderbilt	1	–	3	–	0	2	–	6	–	0
Mississippi College	0	–	1	–	1	4	–	3	–	1
Wofford	0	–	1	–	0	1	–	7	–	1
Central University	0	–	1	–	0	1	–	3	–	1
Mercer	0	–	3	–	0	5	–	4	–	0
Tulane	0	–	3	–	1	3	–	3	–	1
The Citadel	0	–	3	–	0	2	–	5	–	0
+ – Conference co-champions

The 1914 Georgia Bulldogs football team represented the University of Georgia during the 1914 Southern Intercollegiate Athletic Association football season. The Bulldogs completed the season with a 3–5–1 record. In addition to losing four-year letterman and All-American Bob McWhorter, Georgia also lost more than ten experienced players. The inexperience showed in lopsided losses to North Carolina, Virginia, and Clemson. The season ended on a positive note with a tie between Georgia and undefeated Auburn. Quarterback David Paddock was also selected as an All-American in 1914.

== Schedule ==
Date	Opponent	Site	Result	Source
September 26	North Georgia*	Sanford Field; Athens, GA	W 81–0	
October 3	The Citadel	Sanford Field; Athens, GA	W 12–0	
October 10	at Sewanee	Hardee Field; Sewanee, TN	W 7–6	
October 17	vs. North Carolina*	Grant Field; Atlanta, GA	L 6–41	
October 24	at Virginia*	Lambeth Field; Charlottesville, VA	L 0–28	
October 31	Mississippi A&M	Sanford Field; Athens, GA	L 0–9	
November 7	Clemson	Sanford Field; Athens, GA (rivalry)	L 13–35	
November 14	at Georgia Tech*	Grant Field; Atlanta, GA (rivalry)	L 0–7	
November 21	vs. Auburn	Grant Field; Atlanta, GA (rivalry)	T 0–0	
*Non-conference game
