= 1914 Wofford Terriers football team =

American college football season

1914 Wofford Terriers football
- Conference: Southern Intercollegiate Athletic Association
- Record: 1–7–1 (0–1 SIAA)
- Head coach: Curtis McCoy (1st season)

1914 Southern Intercollegiate Athletic Association football standings
	Conf.					Overall
Team	W		L		T	W		L		T
Tennessee +	6	–	0	–	0	9	–	0	–	0
Auburn +	4	–	0	–	1	8	–	0	–	1
Texas A&M	2	–	0	–	0	6	–	1	–	1
Ole Miss	2	–	1	–	1	5	–	4	–	1
Mississippi A&M	4	–	2	–	0	6	–	2	–	0
Sewanee	4	–	2	–	0	5	–	3	–	0
Florida	3	–	2	–	0	5	–	2	–	0
Georgia	2	–	2	–	1	3	–	5	–	1
Clemson	2	–	2	–	0	5	–	3	–	1
Alabama	3	–	3	–	0	5	–	4	–	0
Kentucky	1	–	1	–	0	5	–	3	–	0
LSU	1	–	2	–	1	4	–	4	–	1
Chattanooga	1	–	3	–	0	5	–	4	–	0
Vanderbilt	1	–	3	–	0	2	–	6	–	0
Mississippi College	0	–	1	–	1	4	–	3	–	1
Wofford	0	–	1	–	0	1	–	7	–	1
Central University	0	–	1	–	0	1	–	3	–	1
Mercer	0	–	3	–	0	5	–	4	–	0
Tulane	0	–	3	–	1	3	–	3	–	1
The Citadel	0	–	3	–	0	2	–	5	–	0
+ – Conference co-champions

The 1914 Wofford Terriers football team represented Wofford College as a member the Southern Intercollegiate Athletic Association (SIAA) during the 1914 college football season. Led by first-year head coach Curtis McCoy, the team compiled an overall record of 1–7–1, with a mark of 0–1 in conference play.

== Schedule ==
Date	Opponent	Site	Result	Source
October 3	Riverside Military Academy*	Spartanburg, SC	T 0–0	
October 10	at Furman*	Greenville, SC	L 12–19	
October 17	Davidson*	Spartanburg, SC	L 6–86	
October 24	Presbyterian*	Spartanburg, SC	W 7–0	
October 28	vs. Newberry*	State Fairgrounds; Columbia, SC	L 0–36	
November 4	South Carolina*	Spartanburg Fairgrounds; Spartanburg, SC	L 0–25	
November 7	at Florida	University Field; Gainesville, FL	L 0–66	
November 26	Newberry*	Spartanburg, SC	L 7–15	
December 5	at Wake Forest*	Wake Forest, NC	L 0–41	
*Non-conference game
