= 1914 Clemson Tigers football team =

American college football season

1914 Clemson Tigers football
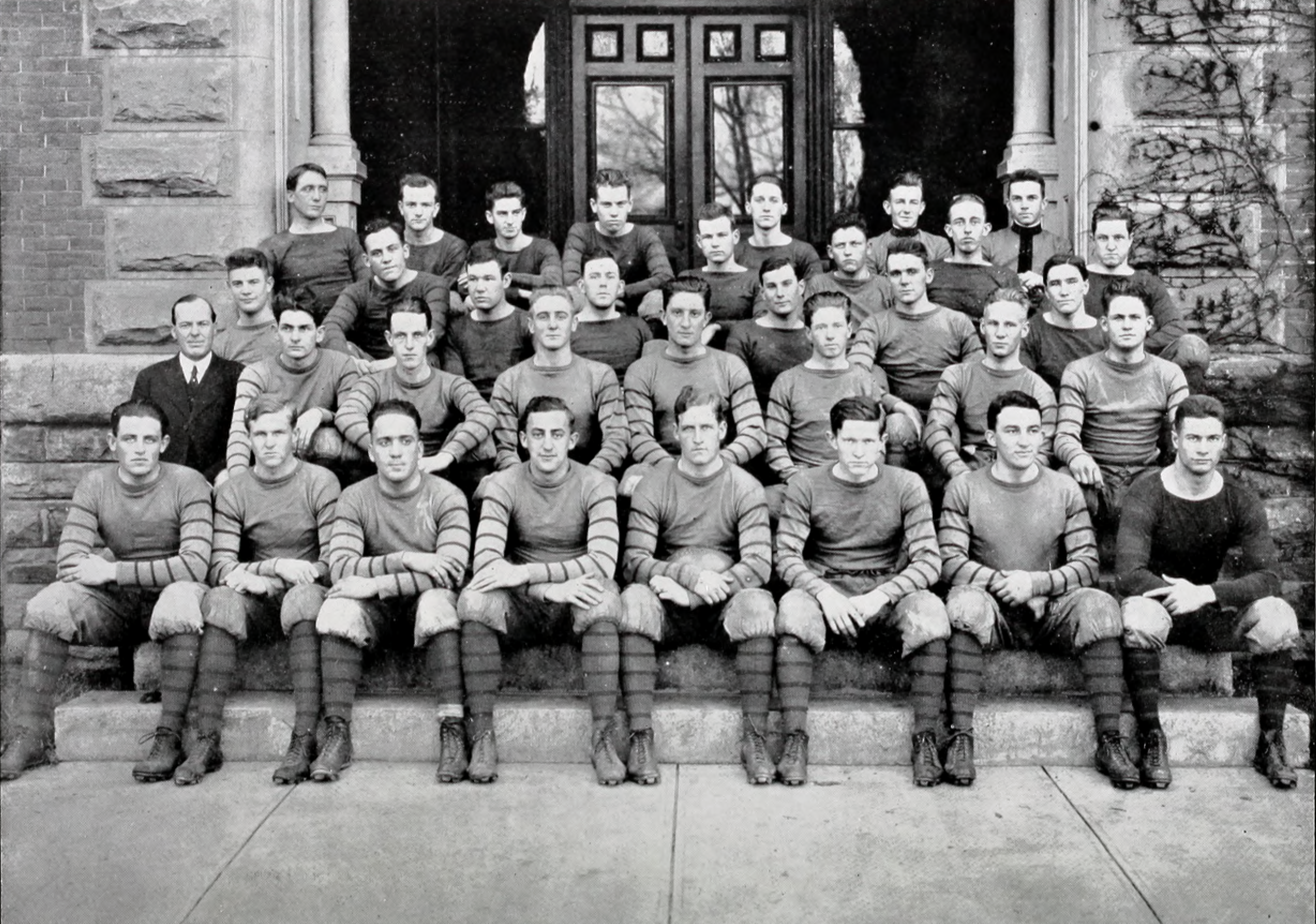

State champion
- Conference: Southern Intercollegiate Athletic Association
- Record: 5–3–1 (2–2 SIAA)
- Head coach: Bob Williams (4th season)
- Captain: William Schilletter

1914 Southern Intercollegiate Athletic Association football standings
	Conf.					Overall
Team	W		L		T	W		L		T
Tennessee +	6	–	0	–	0	9	–	0	–	0
Auburn +	4	–	0	–	1	8	–	0	–	1
Texas A&M	2	–	0	–	0	6	–	1	–	1
Ole Miss	2	–	1	–	1	5	–	4	–	1
Mississippi A&M	4	–	2	–	0	6	–	2	–	0
Sewanee	4	–	2	–	0	5	–	3	–	0
Florida	3	–	2	–	0	5	–	2	–	0
Georgia	2	–	2	–	1	3	–	5	–	1
Clemson	2	–	2	–	0	5	–	3	–	1
Alabama	3	–	3	–	0	5	–	4	–	0
Kentucky	1	–	1	–	0	5	–	3	–	0
LSU	1	–	2	–	1	4	–	4	–	1
Chattanooga	1	–	3	–	0	5	–	4	–	0
Vanderbilt	1	–	3	–	0	2	–	6	–	0
Mississippi College	0	–	1	–	1	4	–	3	–	1
Wofford	0	–	1	–	0	1	–	7	–	1
Central University	0	–	1	–	0	1	–	3	–	1
Mercer	0	–	3	–	0	5	–	4	–	0
Tulane	0	–	3	–	1	3	–	3	–	1
The Citadel	0	–	3	–	0	2	–	5	–	0
+ – Conference co-champions

The 1914 Clemson Tigers football team represented Clemson Agricultural College—now known as Clemson University—as a member of the Southern Intercollegiate Athletic Association (SIAA) during the 1914 college football season. Under fourth-year head coach Bob Williams, the team compiled an overall record of 5–3–1 with a mark of 2–2 in SIAA play. William Schilletter was the team captain.

== Schedule ==
Date	Opponent	Site	Result	Source
October 3	at Davidson*	Sprunt Athletic Field; Davidson, NC	T 0–0	
October 10	at Tennessee	Waite Field; Knoxville, TN	L 0–27	
October 17	at Auburn	Drake Field; Auburn, AL (rivalry)	L 0–28	
October 22	at Furman*	Greenville, SC	W 57–0	
October 29	at South Carolina*	State Fairgrounds; Columbia, SC (rivalry)	W 29–6	
October 31	at The Citadel	College Park Stadium; Charleston, SC	W 14–0	
November 7	at Georgia	Sanford Field; Athens, GA (rivalry)	W 35–13	
November 14	vs. VMI*	Broad Street Park; Richmond, VA	W 27–23	
November 26	at Georgia Tech*	Grant Field; Atlanta, GA (rivalry)	L 6–26	
*Non-conference game
