= 1914 Florida Gators football team =

American college football season

1914 Florida Gators football
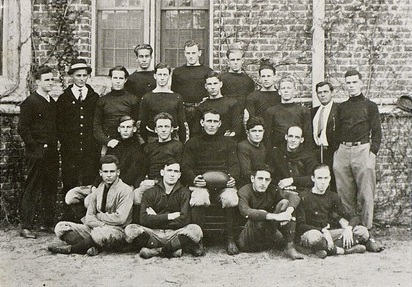
- Conference: Southern Intercollegiate Athletic Association
- Record: 5–2 (3–2 SIAA)
- Head coach: C. J. McCoy (1st season)
- Captains: John Sutton; Puss Hancock
- Home stadium: University Athletic Field

1914 Southern Intercollegiate Athletic Association football standings
	Conf.					Overall
Team	W		L		T	W		L		T
Tennessee +	6	–	0	–	0	9	–	0	–	0
Auburn +	4	–	0	–	1	8	–	0	–	1
Texas A&M	2	–	0	–	0	6	–	1	–	1
Ole Miss	2	–	1	–	1	5	–	4	–	1
Mississippi A&M	4	–	2	–	0	6	–	2	–	0
Sewanee	4	–	2	–	0	5	–	3	–	0
Florida	3	–	2	–	0	5	–	2	–	0
Georgia	2	–	2	–	1	3	–	5	–	1
Clemson	2	–	2	–	0	5	–	3	–	1
Alabama	3	–	3	–	0	5	–	4	–	0
Kentucky	1	–	1	–	0	5	–	3	–	0
LSU	1	–	2	–	1	4	–	4	–	1
Chattanooga	1	–	3	–	0	5	–	4	–	0
Vanderbilt	1	–	3	–	0	2	–	6	–	0
Mississippi College	0	–	1	–	1	4	–	3	–	1
Wofford	0	–	1	–	0	1	–	7	–	1
Central University	0	–	1	–	0	1	–	3	–	1
Mercer	0	–	3	–	0	5	–	4	–	0
Tulane	0	–	3	–	1	3	–	3	–	1
The Citadel	0	–	3	–	0	2	–	5	–	0
+ – Conference co-champions

The 1914 Florida Gators football team represented the University of Florida during the 1914 Southern Intercollegiate Athletic Association football season. The season was C. J. McCoy's first year of three as the head coach of the Gators team. McCoy's 1914 Florida Gators completed their ninth varsity football season on a four-game winning streak, with an overall record of 5–2 and an SIAA conference record of 3–2.

== Before the season ==
End Joe Swanson was shifted to fullback.

== Schedule ==
Date	Opponent	Site	Result	Source
October 10	vs. Auburn	Barrs Field; Jacksonville, FL (rivalry)	L 0–20	
October 17	King*	University Field; Gainesville, FL	W 36–0	
October 24	vs. Sewanee	Barrs Field; Jacksonville, FL	L 0–26	
October 31	vs. Southern College*	Plant Field; Tampa, FL	W 59–0	
November 7	Wofford	University Field; Gainesville, FL	W 66–0	
November 14	at The Citadel	College Park Stadium; Charleston, SC	W 7–0	
November 26	Mercer	University Field; Gainesville, FL	W 14–0	
*Non-conference game

== Game summaries ==
=== Auburn ===
Auburn at Florida

Team	1	2	3	4	Total
• Auburn	0	0	7	13	20
Florida	0	0	0	0	0

- Date: October 10
- Location: Jacksonville, FL

Coach Mike Donahue's Auburn team was nearly as strong as the season before, and beat Florida 20–0 en route to another SIAA title. In contrast to last year, the Gators held Auburn scoreless in the first half, and the loss was seen as a moral victory and sign of progress. However, the Gators also lost their captain. John Sutton left the game feeling poorly, and further examination revealed a weak heart. Roy "Puss" Hancock took over for Sutton as captain.

Auburn's backfield played well and fullback Bedie Bidez scored two touchdowns. Florida gave way to Auburn's superior weight by the second half.

=== King College ===
In the second week of play, Florida enjoyed a first-time victory against the King College Tornado, 36–0.

=== Sewanee ===
Sewanee at Florida

Team	1	2	3	4	Total
• Sewanee	13	7	0	6	26
Florida	0	0	0	0	0

- Date: October 24
- Location: Barrs Field
  Jacksonville, FL
- Referee: Pee Wee Forsythe

Florida suffered a shutout loss to the Sewanee Tigers, 26–0. Florida was outplayed in the first half. In the final period, Sewanee quarterback Lee Tolley had an 85-yard touchdown run.

The starting lineup was Henderson (left end), Lotspeich (left tackle), Goldsby (left guard), Farrior (center), Yon (right guard), Hancock (right tackle), Freeman (right end), Oates (quarterback), Fuller (left halfback), Sparkman (right halfback), Swanson (fullback).

=== Southern College ===
In Tampa, Florida extended the winning streak over Southern College, 59–0.

=== Wofford ===
Florida beat Wofford for the first time, 66–0.

=== The Citadel ===
Florida at The Citadel

Team	1	2	3	4	Total
• Florida	7	0	0	0	7
The Citadel	0	0	0	0	0

- Date: November 14
- Location: College Park Stadium
  Charleston, SC
- Game weather: Heavy rain

In Charleston, the Gators defeated The Citadel 7–0 in a heavy rain and a field saturated with inches of mud. Rammy Ramsdell returned the opening kickoff back 40 yards, and Jim Sparkman eventually carried it over for the decisive touchdown, "before the ball was wet."

=== Mercer ===
Florida closed the season with a 14–0 win over the Mercer Baptists on Thanksgiving.

== Postseason ==
Florida ranked in the top half of the SIAA. The yearbook remarked that a Gator squad had never had more "guts".

== Personnel ==
=== Linemen ===
Player	Position	Games started	High school	Height	Weight	Age
Cappleman	Guard			5'9"	160	23
Cowsert	End			5'8"	145	18
Freeman	End			5'11"	160	20
Jack Goldsby	Guard			5'9"	185	19
Puss Hancock	Tackle			5'10"	185	23
B. Henderson	End			5'9"	155	19
Daddy Lotspiech	Tackle			5'10"	165	23
Rex Farrior	Center		Hillsborough	5'9"	168	18
Reid	End			5'10"	167	19
John B. Sutton	Tackle			6'0"	185	23
Roy Van Camp	Tackle, Back			5'10"	162	20
Everett Yon	Guard			6'0"	175	19

=== Backfield ===
Player	Position	Games started	High school	Height	Weight	Age
Artie Fuller	Fullback			5'11"	158	19
Rammy Ramsdell	Quarterback		Hillsborough	5'10"	148	20
Jim Sparkman	Halfback			5'8"	167	18
Joe Swanson	Fullback			6'0"	165	21
Thompson	Halfback			5'7"	150	23

=== Coaching staff ===
- Head coach: Charles J. McCoy
- Manager: Ed Embry

== Bibliography ==
- McEwen, Tom (1974). The Gators: A Story of Florida Football. Huntsville, Alabama: The Strode Publishers. ISBN 0-87397-025-X.
- University of Florida (1915). The Seminole. Vol. 6.
