= 1914 Chattanooga Moccasins football team =

American college football season

1914 Chattanooga Moccasins football
- Conference: Southern Intercollegiate Athletic Association
- Record: 5–4 (1–3 SIAA)
- Head coach: Mike Balenti (1st season)
- Captain: Paul Dexheimer
- Home stadium: Chamberlain Field

1914 Southern Intercollegiate Athletic Association football standings
	Conf.					Overall
Team	W		L		T	W		L		T
Tennessee +	6	–	0	–	0	9	–	0	–	0
Auburn +	4	–	0	–	1	8	–	0	–	1
Texas A&M	2	–	0	–	0	6	–	1	–	1
Ole Miss	2	–	1	–	1	5	–	4	–	1
Mississippi A&M	4	–	2	–	0	6	–	2	–	0
Sewanee	4	–	2	–	0	5	–	3	–	0
Florida	3	–	2	–	0	5	–	2	–	0
Georgia	2	–	2	–	1	3	–	5	–	1
Clemson	2	–	2	–	0	5	–	3	–	1
Alabama	3	–	3	–	0	5	–	4	–	0
Kentucky	1	–	1	–	0	5	–	3	–	0
LSU	1	–	2	–	1	4	–	4	–	1
Chattanooga	1	–	3	–	0	5	–	4	–	0
Vanderbilt	1	–	3	–	0	2	–	6	–	0
Mississippi College	0	–	1	–	1	4	–	3	–	1
Wofford	0	–	1	–	0	1	–	7	–	1
Central University	0	–	1	–	0	1	–	3	–	1
Mercer	0	–	3	–	0	5	–	4	–	0
Tulane	0	–	3	–	1	3	–	3	–	1
The Citadel	0	–	3	–	0	2	–	5	–	0
+ – Conference co-champions

The 1914 Chattanooga Moccasins football team, located in the American city of Chattanooga, Tennessee, represented the University of Chattanooga during the 1914 college football season. It was the football program's seventh year of intercollegiate college football. The team was part of the Southern Intercollegiate Athletic Association and completed its nine-game schedule with a record of 5–4.

== Schedule ==
Date	Opponent	Site	Result	Source
September 26	at Rhea County High School*	Dayton, TN	W 7–6	
October 4	at Mercer	Central City Park; Macon, GA	W 16–0	
October 9	Maryville (TN)*	Chamberlain Field; Chattanooga, TN	W 37–7	
October 17	at Sewanee	Hardee Field; Sewanee, TN	L 3–46	
October 24	Howard (AL)*	Chamberlain Field; Chattanooga, TN	W 14–0	
October 31	at Tennessee	Waite Field; Knoxville, TN	L 0–67	
November 7	at Transylvania*	Thomas Field; Lexington, KY	L 7–26	
November 13	at Alabama	The Quad; Tuscaloosa, AL	L 0–63	
November 26	Cumberland (TN)*	Chamberlain Field; Chattanooga, TN	W 61–7	
*Non-conference game
