= 1914 Mississippi College Collegians football team =

American college football season

1914 Mississippi College Collegians football
- Conference: Southern Intercollegiate Athletic Association
- Record: 4–3–1 (0–1–1 SIAA)
- Head coach: Dana X. Bible (2nd season)
- Home stadium: Provine Field

1914 Southern Intercollegiate Athletic Association football standings
	Conf.					Overall
Team	W		L		T	W		L		T
Tennessee +	6	–	0	–	0	9	–	0	–	0
Auburn +	4	–	0	–	1	8	–	0	–	1
Texas A&M	2	–	0	–	0	6	–	1	–	1
Ole Miss	2	–	1	–	1	5	–	4	–	1
Mississippi A&M	4	–	2	–	0	6	–	2	–	0
Sewanee	4	–	2	–	0	5	–	3	–	0
Florida	3	–	2	–	0	5	–	2	–	0
Georgia	2	–	2	–	1	3	–	5	–	1
Clemson	2	–	2	–	0	5	–	3	–	1
Alabama	3	–	3	–	0	5	–	4	–	0
Kentucky	1	–	1	–	0	5	–	3	–	0
LSU	1	–	2	–	1	4	–	4	–	1
Chattanooga	1	–	3	–	0	5	–	4	–	0
Vanderbilt	1	–	3	–	0	2	–	6	–	0
Mississippi College	0	–	1	–	1	4	–	3	–	1
Wofford	0	–	1	–	0	1	–	7	–	1
Central University	0	–	1	–	0	1	–	3	–	1
Mercer	0	–	3	–	0	5	–	4	–	0
Tulane	0	–	3	–	1	3	–	3	–	1
The Citadel	0	–	3	–	0	2	–	5	–	0
+ – Conference co-champions

The 1914 Mississippi College Collegians football team represented Mississippi College as a member of the Southern Intercollegiate Athletic Association (SIAA) during the 1914 college football season. Led by second-year head coach Dana X. Bible, Mississippi College compiled an overall record of 4–3–1 with a mark of 0–1–1 in SIAA play.

== Schedule ==
Date	Opponent	Site	Result	Source
October 2	Mississippi State Normal*	Provine Field; Clinton, MS	W 40–0	
October 10	at LSU	State Field; Baton Rouge, LA	L 0–14	
October 17	Jefferson (LA)*	Provine Field; Clinton, MS	W 25–0	
October 26	Ole Miss	Mississippi State Fairgrounds; Jackson, MS	T 7–7	
October 31	Louisiana Industrial*	Mississippi State Fairgrounds; Jackson, MS	W 38–8	
November 7	vs. Christian Brothers (MO)*	Red Elm Park; Memphis, TN	L 0–62	
November 13	Ouachita Baptist*	Provine Field; Clinton, MS	L 0–19	
November 26	Howard (AL)*	Mississippi State Fairgrounds; Jackson, MS	W 27–6	
*Non-conference game
