= 1914 Oklahoma Sooners football team =

American college football season

1914 Oklahoma Sooners football
- Conference: Independent
- Record: 9–1–1
- Head coach: Bennie Owen (10th season)
- Captain: Billy Clark
- Home stadium: Boyd Field

1914 Southern college football independents records
	Conf.			Overall
Team	W	L	T	W		L		T
Texas		–		8	–	0	–	0
Middle Tennessee State Normal		–		5	–	0	–	1
Oklahoma		–		9	–	1	–	1
Delaware		–		7	–	1	–	1
Davidson		–		5	–	1	–	1
Birmingham		–		3	–	1	–	1
Georgia Tech		–		6	–	2	–	0
Presbyterian		–		4	–	1	–	1
Oklahoma A&M		–		6	–	2	–	1
Navy		–		6	–	3	–	0
Maryland		–		5	–	3	–	0
Southwestern Louisiana Industrial		–		5	–	3	–	0
Howard (AL)		–		4	–	3	–	1
Maryville (TN)		–		6	–	4	–	0
Sam Houston Normal		–		3	–	2	–	0
Marshall		–		5	–	4	–	0
West Virginia		–		5	–	4	–	0
Rice		–		3	–	2	–	3
North Texas State Normal		–		3	–	3	–	0
South Carolina		–		5	–	5	–	1
VMI		–		4	–	4	–	0
Mississippi Normal		–		2	–	3	–	1
Texas Mines		–		2	–	3	–	0
Western Kentucky State Normal		–		1	–	2	–	0
Baylor		–		3	–	5	–	2
West Tennessee State Normal		–		3	–	5	–	0
Arkansas		–		3	–	6	–	0
Louisiana Industrial		–		2	–	4	–	0
Wake Forest		–		3	–	6	–	0
Furman		–		2	–	5	–	0
Southwest Texas State		–		2	–	6	–	0
Stetson		–		1	–	4	–	0
Louisville		–		1	–	7	–	0
Catholic University		–		0	–	6	–	1

The 1914 Oklahoma Sooners football team represented the University of Oklahoma in the 1914 college football season. In their 10th year under head coach Bennie Owen, the Sooners compiled a 9–1–1 record, and outscored their opponents by a combined total of 440 to 96.

== Schedule ==
Date	Time	Opponent	Site	Result	Attendance	Source
September 26		Central State Normal	Boyd Field; Norman, OK	W 67–0		
October 3		at Kingfisher	Kingfisher, OK	W 63–0		
October 9		East Central	Boyd Field; Norman, OK	W 96–6		
October 17		Missouri	Boyd Field; Norman, OK (rivalry)	W 13–0		
October 24		vs. Texas	Fair Park Stadium; Dallas, TX (Red River Shootout)	L 7–32	7,500	
October 31		at Kansas	McCook Field; Lawrence, KS	T 16–16	4,000	
November 6	3:36 p.m.	Oklahoma A&M	Boyd Field; Norman, OK (Bedlam)	W 28–6		
November 13		at Kansas State	Ahearn Field; Manhattan, KS	W 52–10		
November 21	3:30 p.m.	vs. Arkansas	Fair Park; Oklahoma City, OK	W 35–7		
November 26		vs. Haskell	Association Park; Kansas City, MO	W 33–12	5,000	
November 30		at Kendall	Tulsa, OK	W 26–7		
