= 1914 Mississippi A&M Aggies football team =

American college football season

1914 Mississippi A&M Aggies football
- Conference: Southern Intercollegiate Athletic Association
- Record: 6–2 (4–2 SIAA)
- Head coach: Earl C. Hayes (1st season)
- Home stadium: New Athletic Field

1914 Southern Intercollegiate Athletic Association football standings
	Conf.					Overall
Team	W		L		T	W		L		T
Tennessee +	6	–	0	–	0	9	–	0	–	0
Auburn +	4	–	0	–	1	8	–	0	–	1
Texas A&M	2	–	0	–	0	6	–	1	–	1
Ole Miss	2	–	1	–	1	5	–	4	–	1
Mississippi A&M	4	–	2	–	0	6	–	2	–	0
Sewanee	4	–	2	–	0	5	–	3	–	0
Florida	3	–	2	–	0	5	–	2	–	0
Georgia	2	–	2	–	1	3	–	5	–	1
Clemson	2	–	2	–	0	5	–	3	–	1
Alabama	3	–	3	–	0	5	–	4	–	0
Kentucky	1	–	1	–	0	5	–	3	–	0
LSU	1	–	2	–	1	4	–	4	–	1
Chattanooga	1	–	3	–	0	5	–	4	–	0
Vanderbilt	1	–	3	–	0	2	–	6	–	0
Mississippi College	0	–	1	–	1	4	–	3	–	1
Wofford	0	–	1	–	0	1	–	7	–	1
Central University	0	–	1	–	0	1	–	3	–	1
Mercer	0	–	3	–	0	5	–	4	–	0
Tulane	0	–	3	–	1	3	–	3	–	1
The Citadel	0	–	3	–	0	2	–	5	–	0
+ – Conference co-champions

The 1914 Mississippi A&M Aggies football team represented The Agricultural and Mechanical College of the State of Mississippi (now known as Mississippi State University) as a member of the Southern Intercollegiate Athletic Association (SIAA) during the 1914 college football season. Led by first-year head coach Earl C. Hayes, the Aggies compiled an overall record of 6–2, with a mark of 4–2 in conference play. Mississippi A&M played home games at the New Athletic Field in Starkville, Mississippi. Hunter Kimball was All-Southern.

== Schedule ==
Date	Opponent	Site	Result	Source
October 2	Marion*	New Athletic Field; Starkville, MS	W 53–0	
October 10	Cumberland (TN)*	New Athletic Field; Starkville, MS	W 77–0	
October 17	at Kentucky	Stoll Field; Lexington, KY	L 13-19	
October 24	at Auburn	Rickwood Field; Birmingham, AL	L 0-19	
October 31	at Georgia	Sanford Field; Athens, GA	W 9–0	
November 7	Mercer	New Athletic Field; Starkville, MS	W 73–0	
November 14	Tulane	State Fairgrounds; Jackson, MS	W 61–0	
November 26	vs. Alabama	Rickwood Field; Birmingham, AL (rivalry)	W 9–0	
*Non-conference game
