= 1914 LSU Tigers football team =

American college football season

1914 LSU Tigers football
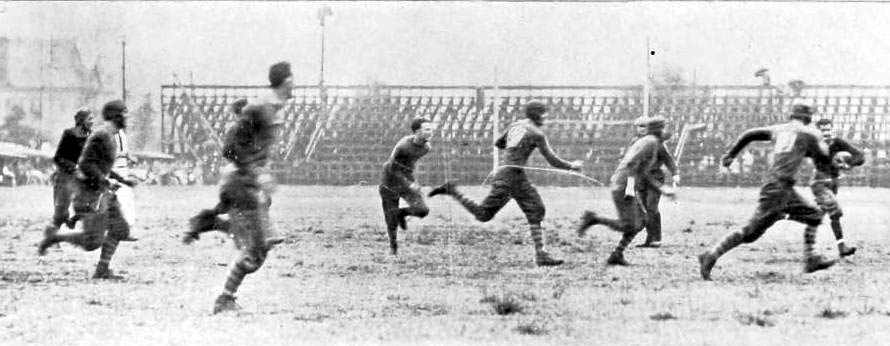
- Photo during the 0–0 tie vs. Tulane
- Conference: Southern Intercollegiate Athletic Association
- Record: 4–4–1 (1–2–1 SIAA)
- Head coach: E. T. McDonald (1st season)
- Captain: George B. Spencer
- Home stadium: State Field

1914 Southern Intercollegiate Athletic Association football standings
	Conf.					Overall
Team	W		L		T	W		L		T
Tennessee +	6	–	0	–	0	9	–	0	–	0
Auburn +	4	–	0	–	1	8	–	0	–	1
Texas A&M	2	–	0	–	0	6	–	1	–	1
Ole Miss	2	–	1	–	1	5	–	4	–	1
Mississippi A&M	4	–	2	–	0	6	–	2	–	0
Sewanee	4	–	2	–	0	5	–	3	–	0
Florida	3	–	2	–	0	5	–	2	–	0
Georgia	2	–	2	–	1	3	–	5	–	1
Clemson	2	–	2	–	0	5	–	3	–	1
Alabama	3	–	3	–	0	5	–	4	–	0
Kentucky	1	–	1	–	0	5	–	3	–	0
LSU	1	–	2	–	1	4	–	4	–	1
Chattanooga	1	–	3	–	0	5	–	4	–	0
Vanderbilt	1	–	3	–	0	2	–	6	–	0
Mississippi College	0	–	1	–	1	4	–	3	–	1
Wofford	0	–	1	–	0	1	–	7	–	1
Central University	0	–	1	–	0	1	–	3	–	1
Mercer	0	–	3	–	0	5	–	4	–	0
Tulane	0	–	3	–	1	3	–	3	–	1
The Citadel	0	–	3	–	0	2	–	5	–	0
+ – Conference co-champions

The 1914 LSU Tigers football team represented the University of Louisiana (now known as Louisiana State University or LSU) as a member of the Southern Intercollegiate Athletic Association (SIAA) during the 1914 college football season. Led by first-year head coach E. T. McDonald, the Tigers compiled an overall record of 4–4–1, with a mark of 1–2–1 in conference play, and finished 12th in the SIAA. LSU played home games at State Field in Baton Rouge, Louisiana.

== Schedule ==
Date	Opponent	Site	Result	Source
September 26	Southwestern Louisiana Industrial*	State Field; Baton Rouge, LA	W 54–0	
October 3	Louisiana Industrial*	State Field; Baton Rouge, LA	W 60–0	
October 10	Mississippi College	State Field; Baton Rouge, LA	W 14–0	
October 17	Ole Miss	State Field; Baton Rouge, LA (rivalry)	L 0–21	
October 24	Jefferson (LA)*	State Field; Baton Rouge, LA	W 14–13	
October 31	vs. Texas A&M	Fair Park; Dallas, TX (rivalry)	L 9–63	
November 7	vs. Arkansas*	Fair Grounds; Shreveport, LA (rivalry)	L 12–20	
November 14	vs. Haskell*	Pelican Park; New Orleans, LA	L 0–31	
November 26	at Tulane	Tulane Stadium; New Orleans, LA (rivalry)	T 0–0	
*Non-conference game
