= 1914 The Citadel Bulldogs football team =

American college football season

1914 The Citadel Bulldogs football
- Conference: Southern Intercollegiate Athletic Association
- Record: 2–5 (0–3 SIAA)
- Head coach: George C. Rogers (2nd season)
- Captain: Augustine Folger
- Home stadium: College Park Stadium

1914 Southern Intercollegiate Athletic Association football standings
	Conf.					Overall
Team	W		L		T	W		L		T
Tennessee +	6	–	0	–	0	9	–	0	–	0
Auburn +	4	–	0	–	1	8	–	0	–	1
Texas A&M	2	–	0	–	0	6	–	1	–	1
Ole Miss	2	–	1	–	1	5	–	4	–	1
Mississippi A&M	4	–	2	–	0	6	–	2	–	0
Sewanee	4	–	2	–	0	5	–	3	–	0
Florida	3	–	2	–	0	5	–	2	–	0
Georgia	2	–	2	–	1	3	–	5	–	1
Clemson	2	–	2	–	0	5	–	3	–	1
Alabama	3	–	3	–	0	5	–	4	–	0
Kentucky	1	–	1	–	0	5	–	3	–	0
LSU	1	–	2	–	1	4	–	4	–	1
Chattanooga	1	–	3	–	0	5	–	4	–	0
Vanderbilt	1	–	3	–	0	2	–	6	–	0
Mississippi College	0	–	1	–	1	4	–	3	–	1
Wofford	0	–	1	–	0	1	–	7	–	1
Central University	0	–	1	–	0	1	–	3	–	1
Mercer	0	–	3	–	0	5	–	4	–	0
Tulane	0	–	3	–	1	3	–	3	–	1
The Citadel	0	–	3	–	0	2	–	5	–	0
+ – Conference co-champions

The 1914 The Citadel Bulldogs football team represented The Citadel as a member of the Southern Intercollegiate Athletic Association (SIAA) during the 1914 college football season. This was the tenth year of intercollegiate football at The Citadel, with George C. Rogers serving as coach for the second season. All home games are believed to have been played at College Park Stadium in Hampton Park.

== Schedule ==
Date	Opponent	Site	Result	Source
October 3	at Georgia	Sanford Field; Athens, GA	L 0–12	
October 10	Porter Military Academy*	College Park Stadium; Charleston, SC	W 12–0	
October 24	vs. Davidson*	Wearn Field; Charlotte, NC	L 0–16	
October 31	Clemson	College Park Stadium; Charleston, SC	L 0–14	
November 7	Newberry*	College Park Stadium; Charleston, SC	W 14–13	
November 14	Florida	College Park Stadium; Charleston, SC	L 0–7	
November 26	at South Carolina*	Davis Field; Columbia, SC	L 6–7	
*Non-conference game
