= 1914 Alabama Crimson Tide football team =

American college football season

1914 Alabama Crimson Tide football
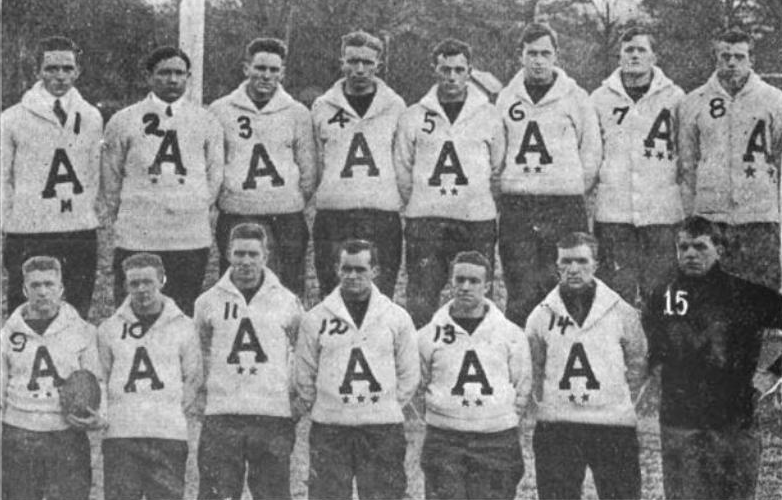
- Conference: Southern Intercollegiate Athletic Association
- Record: 5–4 (3–3 SIAA)
- Head coach: D. V. Graves (4th season)
- Captain: Charles A. Long
- Home stadium: The Quad; Rickwood Field

1914 Southern Intercollegiate Athletic Association football standings
	Conf.					Overall
Team	W		L		T	W		L		T
Tennessee +	6	–	0	–	0	9	–	0	–	0
Auburn +	4	–	0	–	1	8	–	0	–	1
Texas A&M	2	–	0	–	0	6	–	1	–	1
Ole Miss	2	–	1	–	1	5	–	4	–	1
Mississippi A&M	4	–	2	–	0	6	–	2	–	0
Sewanee	4	–	2	–	0	5	–	3	–	0
Florida	3	–	2	–	0	5	–	2	–	0
Georgia	2	–	2	–	1	3	–	5	–	1
Clemson	2	–	2	–	0	5	–	3	–	1
Alabama	3	–	3	–	0	5	–	4	–	0
Kentucky	1	–	1	–	0	5	–	3	–	0
LSU	1	–	2	–	1	4	–	4	–	1
Chattanooga	1	–	3	–	0	5	–	4	–	0
Vanderbilt	1	–	3	–	0	2	–	6	–	0
Mississippi College	0	–	1	–	1	4	–	3	–	1
Wofford	0	–	1	–	0	1	–	7	–	1
Central University	0	–	1	–	0	1	–	3	–	1
Mercer	0	–	3	–	0	5	–	4	–	0
Tulane	0	–	3	–	1	3	–	3	–	1
The Citadel	0	–	3	–	0	2	–	5	–	0
+ – Conference co-champions

The 1914 Alabama Crimson Tide football team (variously "Alabama", "UA" or "Bama") represented the University of Alabama in the 1914 college football season. It was the Crimson Tide's 22nd overall and 19th season as a member of the Southern Intercollegiate Athletic Association (SIAA). The team was led by head coach D. V. Graves, in his fourth year, and played their home games at the University of Alabama Quad in Tuscaloosa and at Rickwood Field in Birmingham, Alabama. They finished the season with a record of five wins and four losses (5–4 overall, 3–3 in the SIAA).

Alabama opened the season with three consecutive, shutout victories over Howard (now Samford University), Birmingham College (now Birmingham–Southern College) and Georgia Tech

Before the Tennessee game, Alabama quarterback Charlie Joplin was ruled ineligible after he refused to sign an affidavit that he had never played professional baseball. Alabama went 3–0 with Joplin and 2–4 after he left the team. The loss to Tennessee at Knoxville would be the last time the two teams met until 1928. The Crimsons then split their final four SIAA games with victories against Tulane and Chattanooga and losses against Sewanee and Mississippi A&M (now Mississippi State University). They then closed the season with a loss against the Carlisle Indian Industrial School Indians led by future College Football Hall of Fame head coach Pop Warner.

== Schedule ==
Date	Opponent	Site	Result	Source
October 3	Howard (AL)*	The Quad; Tuscaloosa, AL	W 13–0	
October 10	Birmingham*	The Quad; Tuscaloosa, AL	W 54–0	
October 17	Georgia Tech	Rickwood Field; Birmingham, AL (rivalry)	W 13–0	
October 24	at Tennessee	Waite Field; Knoxville, TN (rivalry)	L 7–17	
October 31	Tulane	The Quad; Tuscaloosa, AL	W 58–0	
November 7	Sewanee	Rickwood Field; Birmingham, AL	L 0–18	
November 13	Chattanooga	The Quad; Tuscaloosa, AL	W 63–0	
November 26	Mississippi A&M	Rickwood Field; Birmingham, AL (rivalry)	L 0–9	
December 2	Carlisle*	Rickwood Field; Birmingham, AL	L 3–20	
*Non-conference game
