= 1914 Kentucky Wildcats football team =

American college football season

1914 Kentucky Wildcats football
- Conference: Southern Intercollegiate Athletic Association
- Record: 5–3 (1–1 SIAA)
- Head coach: Alpha Brumage (2nd season)
- Captain: Jim Park

1914 Southern Intercollegiate Athletic Association football standings
	Conf.					Overall
Team	W		L		T	W		L		T
Tennessee +	6	–	0	–	0	9	–	0	–	0
Auburn +	4	–	0	–	1	8	–	0	–	1
Texas A&M	2	–	0	–	0	6	–	1	–	1
Ole Miss	2	–	1	–	1	5	–	4	–	1
Mississippi A&M	4	–	2	–	0	6	–	2	–	0
Sewanee	4	–	2	–	0	5	–	3	–	0
Florida	3	–	2	–	0	5	–	2	–	0
Georgia	2	–	2	–	1	3	–	5	–	1
Clemson	2	–	2	–	0	5	–	3	–	1
Alabama	3	–	3	–	0	5	–	4	–	0
Kentucky	1	–	1	–	0	5	–	3	–	0
LSU	1	–	2	–	1	4	–	4	–	1
Chattanooga	1	–	3	–	0	5	–	4	–	0
Vanderbilt	1	–	3	–	0	2	–	6	–	0
Mississippi College	0	–	1	–	1	4	–	3	–	1
Wofford	0	–	1	–	0	1	–	7	–	1
Central University	0	–	1	–	0	1	–	3	–	1
Mercer	0	–	3	–	0	5	–	4	–	0
Tulane	0	–	3	–	1	3	–	3	–	1
The Citadel	0	–	3	–	0	2	–	5	–	0
+ – Conference co-champions

The 1914 Kentucky Wildcats football team represented the University of Kentucky as a member of the Southern Intercollegiate Athletic Association (SIAA) during the 1914 college football season. Led by Alpha Brumage in his second and final season as head coach, the Wildcats compiled an overall record of 5–3 with a mark 1–1 in SIAA play.

== Schedule ==
Date	Opponent	Site	Result	Source
September 26	Wilmington (OH)*	Stoll Field; Lexington, KY	W 87–0	
October 3	Maryville (TN)*	Stoll Field; Lexington, KY	W 80–0	
October 17	Mississippi A&M	Stoll Field; Lexington, KY	W 19–13	
October 24	Earlham*	Stoll Field; Lexington, KY	W 81–3	
October 31	at Cincinnati*	Carson Field; Cincinnati, OH	L 7–14	
November 7	at Purdue*	Stuart Field; West Lafayette, IN	L 6–40	
November 14	Louisville*	Stoll Field; Lexington, KY (rivalry)	W 42–0	
November 26	at Tennessee	Waite Field; Knoxville, TN (rivalry)	L 6–23	
*Non-conference game
