= 1914 Tulane Olive and Blue football team =

American college football season

1914 Tulane Olive and Blue football
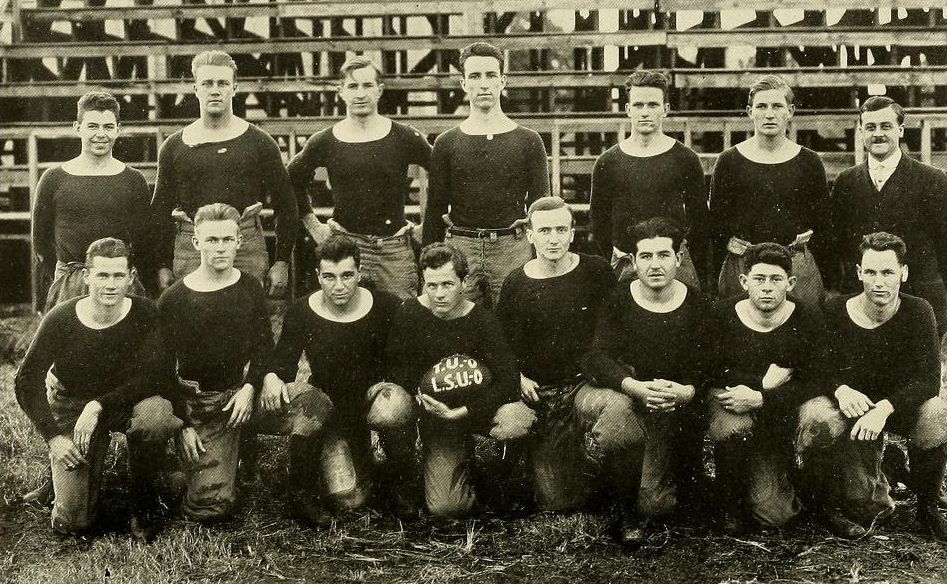
- The 1914 team with a football painted to celebrate their tie with LSU
- Conference: Southern Intercollegiate Athletic Association
- Record: 3–3–1 (0–3–1 SIAA)
- Head coach: Edwin Sweetland (1st season)
- Captain: Garrett George
- Home stadium: First Tulane Stadium

1914 Southern Intercollegiate Athletic Association football standings
| | Conf. | | | | | Overall |
| Team | W | | L | | T | W | | L | | T |
|---|---|---|---|---|---|---|---|---|---|---|
| Tennessee + | 6 | – | 0 | – | 0 | 9 | – | 0 | – | 0 |
| Auburn + | 4 | – | 0 | – | 1 | 8 | – | 0 | – | 1 |
| Texas A&M | 2 | – | 0 | – | 0 | 6 | – | 1 | – | 1 |
| Ole Miss | 2 | – | 1 | – | 1 | 5 | – | 4 | – | 1 |
| Mississippi A&M | 4 | – | 2 | – | 0 | 6 | – | 2 | – | 0 |
| Sewanee | 4 | – | 2 | – | 0 | 5 | – | 3 | – | 0 |
| Florida | 3 | – | 2 | – | 0 | 5 | – | 2 | – | 0 |
| Georgia | 2 | – | 2 | – | 1 | 3 | – | 5 | – | 1 |
| Clemson | 2 | – | 2 | – | 0 | 5 | – | 3 | – | 1 |
| Alabama | 3 | – | 3 | – | 0 | 5 | – | 4 | – | 0 |
| Kentucky | 1 | – | 1 | – | 0 | 5 | – | 3 | – | 0 |
| LSU | 1 | – | 2 | – | 1 | 4 | – | 4 | – | 1 |
| Chattanooga | 1 | – | 3 | – | 0 | 5 | – | 4 | – | 0 |
| Vanderbilt | 1 | – | 3 | – | 0 | 2 | – | 6 | – | 0 |
| Mississippi College | 0 | – | 1 | – | 1 | 4 | – | 3 | – | 1 |
| Wofford | 0 | – | 1 | – | 0 | 1 | – | 7 | – | 1 |
| Central University | 0 | – | 1 | – | 0 | 1 | – | 3 | – | 1 |
| Mercer | 0 | – | 3 | – | 0 | 5 | – | 4 | – | 0 |
| Tulane | 0 | – | 3 | – | 1 | 3 | – | 3 | – | 1 |
| The Citadel | 0 | – | 3 | – | 0 | 2 | – | 5 | – | 0 |
+ – Conference co-champions

The 1914 Tulane Olive and Blue football team was an American football team that represented Tulane University as a member of the Southern Intercollegiate Athletic Association (SIAA) during the 1914 college football season. In its first year under head coach Edwin Sweetland, Tulane compiled a 3–3–1 record and was outscored by a total of 147 to 145.

== Schedule ==
| Date | Opponent | Site | Result | Source |
|---|---|---|---|---|
| October 17 | Southwestern Louisiana* | Tulane Stadium; New Orleans, LA | W 33–0 | |
| October 24 | Centenary* | Tulane Stadium; New Orleans, LA | W 82–0 | |
| October 27 | Jefferson College (LA)* | Tulane Stadium; New Orleans, LA | W 24–7 | |
| October 31 | at Alabama | The Quad; Tuscaloosa, AL | L 0–58 | |
| November 7 | Ole Miss | Tulane Stadium; New Orleans, LA (rivalry) | L 6–21 | |
| November 14 | vs. Mississippi A&M | State Fairgrounds; Jackson, MS | L 0–61 | |
| November 26 | LSU | Tulane Stadium; New Orleans, LA (rivalry) | T 0–0 | |
*Non-conference game
