= 1914 Baylor football team =

American college football season

1914 Baylor football
- Conference: Independent
- Record: 3–5–2
- Head coach: Charles Mosley (1st season)
- Captain: J. D. "Eli" Isaacks
- Home stadium: Carroll Field

1914 Southern college football independents records
	Conf.			Overall
Team	W	L	T	W		L		T
Texas		–		8	–	0	–	0
Middle Tennessee State Normal		–		5	–	0	–	1
Oklahoma		–		9	–	1	–	1
Delaware		–		7	–	1	–	1
Davidson		–		5	–	1	–	1
Birmingham		–		3	–	1	–	1
Georgia Tech		–		6	–	2	–	0
Presbyterian		–		4	–	1	–	1
Oklahoma A&M		–		6	–	2	–	1
Navy		–		6	–	3	–	0
Maryland		–		5	–	3	–	0
Southwestern Louisiana Industrial		–		5	–	3	–	0
Howard (AL)		–		4	–	3	–	1
Maryville (TN)		–		6	–	4	–	0
Sam Houston Normal		–		3	–	2	–	0
Marshall		–		5	–	4	–	0
West Virginia		–		5	–	4	–	0
Rice		–		3	–	2	–	3
North Texas State Normal		–		3	–	3	–	0
South Carolina		–		5	–	5	–	1
VMI		–		4	–	4	–	0
Mississippi Normal		–		2	–	3	–	1
Texas Mines		–		2	–	3	–	0
Western Kentucky State Normal		–		1	–	2	–	0
Baylor		–		3	–	5	–	2
West Tennessee State Normal		–		3	–	5	–	0
Arkansas		–		3	–	6	–	0
Louisiana Industrial		–		2	–	4	–	0
Wake Forest		–		3	–	6	–	0
Furman		–		2	–	5	–	0
Southwest Texas State		–		2	–	6	–	0
Stetson		–		1	–	4	–	0
Louisville		–		1	–	7	–	0
Catholic University		–		0	–	6	–	1

The 1914 Baylor football team represented Baylor University during the 1914 college football season. In January 1914, a questionnaire regarding a possible conference was sent out to the larger institutions in Texas, Mississippi, Louisiana, Arkansas, and Oklahoma. Only Texas A&M failed to express an opinion; all other schools were positive. "No school should be omitted that hasn't the money to keep itself going and be able to play members of the association", Baylor representative C.A. Ganti replied. "This we could not do." In late April and early May, eight institutions met to create the Southwest Conference, to which Baylor was invited and did become a charter member in December of that year. Baylor did not adopt a mascot (the Baylor Bears) until December 14, 1914, after the completion of the 1914 football season.

== Schedule ==
Date	Opponent	Site	Result	Source
October 3	Howard Payne	Carroll Field; Waco, TX	W 9–0	
October 10	at Texas	Clark Field; Austin, TX (rivalry)	L 0–57	
October 17	vs. Trinity (TX)	Fair Ground Field; Dallas, TX	L 0–7	
October 23	at Austin	Luckett Park; Sherman, TX	T 0–0	
October 26	at Oklahoma A&M	Lewis Field; Stillwater, OK	L 0–60	
October 31	TCU	Carroll Field; Waco, TX (rivalry)	W 28–14	
November 6	Daniel Baker	Carroll Field; Waco, TX	W 14–0	
November 14	Trinity (TX)	Carroll Field; Waco, TX	T 0–0	
November 20	at Rice	Rice Field; Houston, TX	L 13–14	
November 26	Southwestern (TX)	Carroll Field; Waco, TX	L 6–7	
