= 1914 Rice Owls football team =

American college football season

1914 Rice Owls football
- Conference: Independent
- Record: 3–2–3
- Head coach: Philip Arbuckle (3rd season)
- Captain: Oliver Garnett
- Home stadium: Rice Field, West End Park

1914 Southern college football independents records
| | Conf. | | | Overall |
| Team | W | L | T | W | | L | | T |
|---|---|---|---|---|---|---|---|---|
| Texas | | – | | 8 | – | 0 | – | 0 |
| Middle Tennessee State Normal | | – | | 5 | – | 0 | – | 1 |
| Oklahoma | | – | | 9 | – | 1 | – | 1 |
| Delaware | | – | | 7 | – | 1 | – | 1 |
| Davidson | | – | | 5 | – | 1 | – | 1 |
| Birmingham | | – | | 3 | – | 1 | – | 1 |
| Georgia Tech | | – | | 6 | – | 2 | – | 0 |
| Presbyterian | | – | | 4 | – | 1 | – | 1 |
| Oklahoma A&M | | – | | 6 | – | 2 | – | 1 |
| Navy | | – | | 6 | – | 3 | – | 0 |
| Maryland | | – | | 5 | – | 3 | – | 0 |
| Southwestern Louisiana Industrial | | – | | 5 | – | 3 | – | 0 |
| Howard (AL) | | – | | 4 | – | 3 | – | 1 |
| Maryville (TN) | | – | | 6 | – | 4 | – | 0 |
| Sam Houston Normal | | – | | 3 | – | 2 | – | 0 |
| Marshall | | – | | 5 | – | 4 | – | 0 |
| West Virginia | | – | | 5 | – | 4 | – | 0 |
| Rice | | – | | 3 | – | 2 | – | 3 |
| North Texas State Normal | | – | | 3 | – | 3 | – | 0 |
| South Carolina | | – | | 5 | – | 5 | – | 1 |
| VMI | | – | | 4 | – | 4 | – | 0 |
| Mississippi Normal | | – | | 2 | – | 3 | – | 1 |
| Texas Mines | | – | | 2 | – | 3 | – | 0 |
| Western Kentucky State Normal | | – | | 1 | – | 2 | – | 0 |
| Baylor | | – | | 3 | – | 5 | – | 2 |
| West Tennessee State Normal | | – | | 3 | – | 5 | – | 0 |
| Arkansas | | – | | 3 | – | 6 | – | 0 |
| Louisiana Industrial | | – | | 2 | – | 4 | – | 0 |
| Wake Forest | | – | | 3 | – | 6 | – | 0 |
| Furman | | – | | 2 | – | 5 | – | 0 |
| Southwest Texas State | | – | | 2 | – | 6 | – | 0 |
| Stetson | | – | | 1 | – | 4 | – | 0 |
| Louisville | | – | | 1 | – | 7 | – | 0 |
| Catholic University | | – | | 0 | – | 6 | – | 1 |

The 1914 Rice Owls football team was an American football team that represented Rice Institute as an independent during the 1914 college football season. In its third season under head coach Philip Arbuckle, the team compiled a 3–2–3 record and was outscored by a total of 113 to 59.

== Schedule ==
| Date | Opponent | Site | Result | Source |
|---|---|---|---|---|
| October 10 | Southwestern (TX) | Rice Field; Houston, TX | W 12–7 | |
| October 17 | at Texas | Clark Field; Austin, TX (rivalry) | L 0–41 | |
| October 24 | TCU | Rice Field; Houston, TX | T 0–0 | |
| October 31 | Daniel Baker | Rice Field; Houston, TX | W 13–7 | |
| November 9 | Texas A&M | Rice Field; Houston, TX | L 7–32 | |
| November 14 | Oklahoma A&M | West End Park; Houston, TX | T 13–13 | |
| November 20 | Baylor | Rice Field; Houston, TX | W 14–13 | |
| November 26 | at Austin | Sherman, TX | T 0–0 | |
