= 1914 Mercer Baptists football team =

American college football season

1914 Mercer Baptists football
- Conference: Southern Intercollegiate Athletic Association
- Record: 5–4 (0–3 SIAA)
- Head coach: Fred A. Robins (1st season)
- Home stadium: Central City Park

1914 Southern Intercollegiate Athletic Association football standings
	Conf.					Overall
Team	W		L		T	W		L		T
Tennessee +	6	–	0	–	0	9	–	0	–	0
Auburn +	4	–	0	–	1	8	–	0	–	1
Texas A&M	2	–	0	–	0	6	–	1	–	1
Ole Miss	2	–	1	–	1	5	–	4	–	1
Mississippi A&M	4	–	2	–	0	6	–	2	–	0
Sewanee	4	–	2	–	0	5	–	3	–	0
Florida	3	–	2	–	0	5	–	2	–	0
Georgia	2	–	2	–	1	3	–	5	–	1
Clemson	2	–	2	–	0	5	–	3	–	1
Alabama	3	–	3	–	0	5	–	4	–	0
Kentucky	1	–	1	–	0	5	–	3	–	0
LSU	1	–	2	–	1	4	–	4	–	1
Chattanooga	1	–	3	–	0	5	–	4	–	0
Vanderbilt	1	–	3	–	0	2	–	6	–	0
Mississippi College	0	–	1	–	1	4	–	3	–	1
Wofford	0	–	1	–	0	1	–	7	–	1
Central University	0	–	1	–	0	1	–	3	–	1
Mercer	0	–	3	–	0	5	–	4	–	0
Tulane	0	–	3	–	1	3	–	3	–	1
The Citadel	0	–	3	–	0	2	–	5	–	0
+ – Conference co-champions

The 1914 Mercer Baptists football team was an American football team that represented Mercer University as a member of the Southern Intercollegiate Athletic Association (SIAA) during the 1914 college football season. In their first year under head coach Fred A. Robins, the team compiled an 5–4 record.

== Schedule ==
Date	Opponent	Site	Result	Source
September 26	Gordon Institute*	Central City Park; Macon, GA	W 44–0	
October 3	Chattanooga	Central City Park; Macon, GA	L 0–16	
October 10	at Georgia Tech*	Grant Field; Atlanta, GA	L 0–105	
October 21	King (TN)*	Central City Park; Macon, GA	W 27–7	
October 24	at Georgia Military*	Milledgeville, GA	W 26–0	
October 31	Furman*	Central City Park; Macon, GA	W 39–0	
November 7	at Mississippi A&M	New Athletic Field; Starkville, MS	L 0–73	
November 14	at Stetson*	Jacksonville, FL	W 45–0	
November 26	at Florida	University Field; Gainesville, FL	L 0–16	
*Non-conference game
