= 1914 Texas A&M Aggies football team =

American college football season

1914 Texas A&M Aggies football
- Conference: Southern Intercollegiate Athletic Association
- Record: 6–1–1 (2–0 SIAA)
- Head coach: Charley Moran (6th season)
- Home stadium: Kyle Field

1914 Southern Intercollegiate Athletic Association football standings
	Conf.					Overall
Team	W		L		T	W		L		T
Tennessee +	6	–	0	–	0	9	–	0	–	0
Auburn +	4	–	0	–	1	8	–	0	–	1
Texas A&M	2	–	0	–	0	6	–	1	–	1
Ole Miss	2	–	1	–	1	5	–	4	–	1
Mississippi A&M	4	–	2	–	0	6	–	2	–	0
Sewanee	4	–	2	–	0	5	–	3	–	0
Florida	3	–	2	–	0	5	–	2	–	0
Georgia	2	–	2	–	1	3	–	5	–	1
Clemson	2	–	2	–	0	5	–	3	–	1
Alabama	3	–	3	–	0	5	–	4	–	0
Kentucky	1	–	1	–	0	5	–	3	–	0
LSU	1	–	2	–	1	4	–	4	–	1
Chattanooga	1	–	3	–	0	5	–	4	–	0
Vanderbilt	1	–	3	–	0	2	–	6	–	0
Mississippi College	0	–	1	–	1	4	–	3	–	1
Wofford	0	–	1	–	0	1	–	7	–	1
Central University	0	–	1	–	0	1	–	3	–	1
Mercer	0	–	3	–	0	5	–	4	–	0
Tulane	0	–	3	–	1	3	–	3	–	1
The Citadel	0	–	3	–	0	2	–	5	–	0
+ – Conference co-champions

The 1914 Texas A&M Aggies football team was an American football team that represented the Agricultural and Mechanical College of Texas—now known as Texas A&M University—as a member of the Southern Intercollegiate Athletic Association (SIAA) during the 1914 college football season. In their sixth and final year under head coach Charley Moran, the Aggies compiled an overall record of 6–1–1 with a mark of 2–0 in SIAA play.

== Schedule ==
Date	Time	Opponent	Site	Result	Attendance	Source
October 2		Austin	Kyle Field; College Station, TX	W 32–0		
October 9		Trinity (TX)	Kyle Field; College Station, TX	T 0–0		
October 16		TCU	Kyle Field; College Station, TX (rivalry)	W 40–0		
October 23		vs. Haskell	Morris Park; Fort Worth, TX	L 0–10	3,000	
October 31		vs. LSU	Fair Park; Dallas, TX (rivalry)	W 63–9		
November 9		at Rice	Rice Field; Houston, TX	W 32–7		
November 17		Oklahoma A&M	Kyle Field; College Station, TX	W 24–0		
November 26	3:10 p.m.	vs. Ole Miss	Baseball park; Beaumont, TX	W 14–7	500	
