= 1914 Ole Miss Rebels football team =

American college football season

1914 Ole Miss Rebels football
- Conference: Southern Intercollegiate Athletic Association
- Record: 5–4–1 (2–1–1 SIAA)
- Head coach: William L. Driver (2nd season)

1914 Southern Intercollegiate Athletic Association football standings
	Conf.					Overall
Team	W		L		T	W		L		T
Tennessee +	6	–	0	–	0	9	–	0	–	0
Auburn +	4	–	0	–	1	8	–	0	–	1
Texas A&M	2	–	0	–	0	6	–	1	–	1
Ole Miss	2	–	1	–	1	5	–	4	–	1
Mississippi A&M	4	–	2	–	0	6	–	2	–	0
Sewanee	4	–	2	–	0	5	–	3	–	0
Florida	3	–	2	–	0	5	–	2	–	0
Georgia	2	–	2	–	1	3	–	5	–	1
Clemson	2	–	2	–	0	5	–	3	–	1
Alabama	3	–	3	–	0	5	–	4	–	0
Kentucky	1	–	1	–	0	5	–	3	–	0
LSU	1	–	2	–	1	4	–	4	–	1
Chattanooga	1	–	3	–	0	5	–	4	–	0
Vanderbilt	1	–	3	–	0	2	–	6	–	0
Mississippi College	0	–	1	–	1	4	–	3	–	1
Wofford	0	–	1	–	0	1	–	7	–	1
Central University	0	–	1	–	0	1	–	3	–	1
Mercer	0	–	3	–	0	5	–	4	–	0
Tulane	0	–	3	–	1	3	–	3	–	1
The Citadel	0	–	3	–	0	2	–	5	–	0
+ – Conference co-champions

The 1914 Ole Miss Rebels football team represented the University of Mississippi (Ole Miss) as a member of the Southern Intercollegiate Athletic Association (SIAA) during the 1914 college football season. Led by second-year head coach William L. Driver, the Rebels compiled an overall record of 5–4–1, with a mark of 2–1–1 in conference play.

== Schedule ==
Date	Time	Opponent	Site	Result	Attendance	Source
October 5		Jonesboro Aggies*	Oxford, MS	W 20–0		
October 10		Southwestern Presbyterian*	Oxford, MS	W 14–0		
October 17		at LSU	State Field; Baton Rouge, LA (rivalry)	W 21–0		
October 26		at Mississippi College	Mississippi State Fairgrounds; Jackson, MS	T 7–7		
October 31		vs. Ouachita Baptist*	Red Elm Park; Memphis, TN	L 0–7		
November 7		at Tulane	Tulane Stadium; New Orleans, LA (rivalry)	W 21–6		
November 13	2:00 p.m.	at Arkansas*	Kavanaugh Field; Little Rock, AR (rivalry)	W 13–7		
November 17		at Texas*	Clark Field; Austin, TX	L 7–66		
November 20		at Southwestern (TX)*	Georgetown, TX	L 0–18		
November 26	3:10 p.m.	vs. Texas A&M*	Baseball park; Beaumont, TX	L 7–14	500	
*Non-conference game
