= 1914 Vanderbilt Commodores football team =

American college football season

1914 Vanderbilt Commodores football
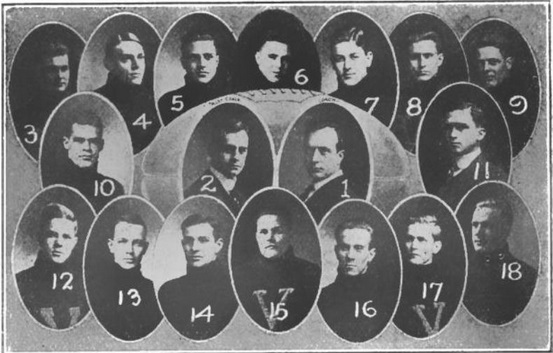
- Conference: Southern Intercollegiate Athletic Association
- Record: 2–6 (1–3 SIAA)
- Head coach: Dan McGugin (11th season)
- Offensive scheme: Short punt
- Captain: Ammie Sikes
- Home stadium: Dudley Field

1914 Southern Intercollegiate Athletic Association football standings
	Conf.					Overall
Team	W		L		T	W		L		T
Tennessee +	6	–	0	–	0	9	–	0	–	0
Auburn +	4	–	0	–	1	8	–	0	–	1
Texas A&M	2	–	0	–	0	6	–	1	–	1
Ole Miss	2	–	1	–	1	5	–	4	–	1
Mississippi A&M	4	–	2	–	0	6	–	2	–	0
Sewanee	4	–	2	–	0	5	–	3	–	0
Florida	3	–	2	–	0	5	–	2	–	0
Georgia	2	–	2	–	1	3	–	5	–	1
Clemson	2	–	2	–	0	5	–	3	–	1
Alabama	3	–	3	–	0	5	–	4	–	0
Kentucky	1	–	1	–	0	5	–	3	–	0
LSU	1	–	2	–	1	4	–	4	–	1
Chattanooga	1	–	3	–	0	5	–	4	–	0
Vanderbilt	1	–	3	–	0	2	–	6	–	0
Mississippi College	0	–	1	–	1	4	–	3	–	1
Wofford	0	–	1	–	0	1	–	7	–	1
Central University	0	–	1	–	0	1	–	3	–	1
Mercer	0	–	3	–	0	5	–	4	–	0
Tulane	0	–	3	–	1	3	–	3	–	1
The Citadel	0	–	3	–	0	2	–	5	–	0
+ – Conference co-champions

The 1914 Vanderbilt Commodores football team represented Vanderbilt University in the 1914 Southern Intercollegiate Athletic Association football season. The 1914 season was Dan McGugin's 11th year as head coach. Members of the Southern Intercollegiate Athletic Association, the Commodores played six home games in Nashville, Tennessee and finished the season with a record of 2–6 and 1–3 in conference play. Michigan reporters spread rumors that Josh Cody was put out of the game for slugging, though he just suffered an injury. Despite the poor record, tackle Josh Cody, quarterback Irby Curry and fullback Ammie Sikes were selected for Outing's Roll of Honor.

== Schedule ==
Date	Opponent	Site	Result	Attendance	Source
October 3	Henderson-Brown*	Dudley Field; Nashville, TN	W 42–6		
October 10	at Michigan*	Ferry Field; Ann Arbor, MI	L 3–23	5,282	
October 20	Central University	Dudley Field; Nashville, TN	W 59–0		
October 24	North Carolina*	Dudley Field; Nashville, TN	L 9–10		
October 31	Virginia*	Dudley Field; Nashville, TN	L 7–20		
November 7	Tennessee	Dudley Field; Nashville, TN (rivalry)	L 14–16		
November 14	at Auburn	Rickwood Field; Birmingham, AL	L 0–6	10,000	
November 26	Sewanee	Dudley Field; Nashville, TN (rivalry)	L 13–14		
*Non-conference game
