= 1914 Texas Longhorns football team =

American college football season

1914 Texas Longhorns football
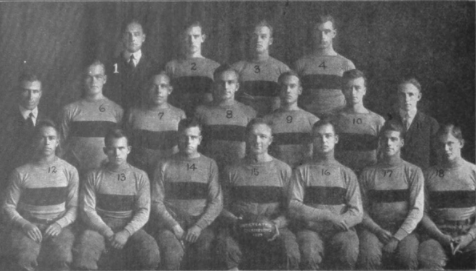

National champion (Billingsley MOV) TIAA champion
- Conference: Texas Intercollegiate Athletic Association
- Record: 8–0 (4–0 TIAA)
- Head coach: Dave Allerdice (4th season)
- Captain: Louis Jordan
- Home stadium: Clark Field

1914 Texas Intercollegiate Athletic Association football standings
	Conf.					Overall
Team	W		L		T	W		L		T
Texas $	4	–	0	–	0	8	–	0	–	0
Texas A&M	4	–	0	–	0	6	–	1	–	1
Rice	3	–	2	–	2	3	–	2	–	3
Southwestern (TX)	3	–	2	–	0	4	–	4	–	0
Trinity (TX)	3	–	2	–	2	4	–	2	–	2
Daniel Baker	3	–	2	–	0	6	–	3	–	0
Baylor	2	–	4	–	2	3	–	5	–	2
TCU	1	–	3	–	1	3	–	4	–	1
Austin	0	–	5	–	2	0	–	6	–	2
$ – Conference champion

The 1914 Texas Longhorns football team was an American football team that represented the University of Texas as an independent during the 1914 college football season. In their fourth season under head coach Dave Allerdice, the Longhorns compiled an 8–0 record, shut out five of eight opponents, and outscored all opponents by a total of 358 to 21.

There was no contemporaneous system in 1914 for determining a national champion. However, Texas was retroactively named as the national champion by the Billingsley Report using its alternate "margin of victory" methodology. Other selectors chose Army or Illinois as the national champion.

Guard Louis Jordan was selected by Walter Camp as a second-team player on the 1914 All-America college football team.

== Schedule ==
Date	Time	Opponent	Site	Result	Attendance	Source
October 3		Trinity (TX)	Clark Field; Austin, TX	W 30–0		
October 10		Baylor	Clark Field; Austin, TX (rivalry)	W 57–0		
October 17		Rice	Clark Field; Austin, TX (rivalry)	W 41–0		
October 24		vs. Oklahoma*	Fair Park Stadium; Dallas, TX (Red River Rivalry)	W 32–7	7,500	
October 31		Southwestern (TX)	Clark Field; Austin, TX	W 70–0		
November 7	3:00 p.m.	vs. Haskell*	West End Park; Houston, TX	W 23–7	5,300	
November 17		Ole Miss*	Clark Field; Austin, TX	W 66–7		
November 26	3:07 p.m.	Wabash*	Clark Field; Austin, TX	W 39–0		
*Non-conference game

== Personnel ==
=== Line ===
Player	Position	Years on team	Home town	Height	Weight	Age
Pete Edmonds	Right End	2	Waco, Texas	5'8"	160	21
K.L. Berry	Right Tackle	2	Denton, Texas	6'0"	180	21
Louis Jordan [C]	Right Guard	4	Fredericksburg, Texas	6'2"	205	24
Gustav "Pig" Dittmar	Center	2	Houston, Texas	5'10"	165	21
James Goodman	Left Guard	3	Austin, Texas	6'0"	180	25
W.S. Birge	Left Tackle	3	Austin, Texas	6'0"	180	22
Charlie Turner	Left End	2	Roswell, New Mexico	5'8"	158	21
Alva Carlton	Tackle	1	Houston, Texas			
Raymond Keck	Center	1				

=== Backfield ===
Player	Position	Years on team	Home town	Height	Weight	Age
A.L. "Coke" Wimmer	Quarterback	2	Dallas, Texas	6'0"	156	21
Clyde Littlefield	Right Halfback	3	Berclair, Texas	6'0"	180	21
Leonard Barrell	Left Halfback	3	Houston, Texas	5'10"	180	20
Bert Walker	Fullback	3	Azle, Texas	5'11"	170	21
H.H. Neilson	Fullback	1				
Halkert A. Halbert	Halfback	1				
