= 1915 Texas Mines Miners football team =

American college football season

1915 Texas Mines Miners football
- Conference: Independent
- Record: 3–2
- Head coach: Tommy Dwyer (2nd season)

1915 Southern college football independents records
	Conf.			Overall
Team	W	L	T	W		L		T
Georgia Tech		–		7	–	0	–	1
Ouachita Baptist		–		7	–	1	–	0
Dallas		–		6	–	1	–	0
Spring Hill		–		6	–	1	–	0
North Texas State Normal		–		5	–	1	–	1
Sam Houston Normal		–		5	–	1	–	1
West Virginia		–		5	–	1	–	1
Jonesboro Aggies		–		4	–	1	–	1
Johns Hopkins		–		6	–	2	–	0
VMI		–		6	–	2	–	1
Southwestern Louisiana Industrial		–		5	–	2	–	1
Delaware		–		6	–	3	–	0
Maryland		–		6	–	3	–	0
Louisiana Normal College		–		4	–	2	–	0
Southwest Texas State		–		5	–	3	–	2
Davidson		–		4	–	3	–	1
Mississippi Normal		–		4	–	3	–	0
West Tennessee State Normal		–		4	–	3	–	0
Guilford		–		1	–	1	–	0
Middle Tennessee State Normal		–		3	–	3	–	1
Birmingham		–		2	–	2	–	1
Presbyterian		–		4	–	4	–	0
Henderson-Brown		–		3	–	4	–	1
TCU		–		4	–	5	–	0
Wake Forest		–		3	–	4	–	0
Navy		–		3	–	5	–	1
Western Kentucky State Normal		–		1	–	4	–	2
Louisville		–		1	–	5	–	1
Marshall		–		1	–	7	–	0

The 1915 Texas Mines Miners football team was an American football team that represented the Texas School of Mines (now known as the University of Texas at El Paso) as an independent during the 1915 college football season. In their second year under head coach Tommy Dwyer, the team compiled a 3–2 record.

== Schedule ==
Date	Opponent	Site	Result
October 7	20th Infantry	El Paso, TX	W 42–6
October 21	4th Artillery	El Paso, TX	W 13–6
October 30	at New Mexico A&M	Miller Field; Las Cruces, NM (rivalry)	L 0–34
November 11	2nd Artillery	El Paso, TX	L 0–14
November 24	at El Paso High School	El Paso HS Stadium; El Paso, TX	W
