= 1915 Southwestern Presbyterian football team =

American college football season

1915 Southwestern Presbyterian football
- Conference: Independent
- Record: 3–4
- Head coach: Benton L. Boykin
- Home stadium: Shearer Field

1915 Southern college football independents records
| | Conf. | | | Overall |
| Team | W | L | T | W | | L | | T |
|---|---|---|---|---|---|---|---|---|
| Georgia Tech | | – | | 7 | – | 0 | – | 1 |
| Ouachita Baptist | | – | | 7 | – | 1 | – | 0 |
| Dallas | | – | | 6 | – | 1 | – | 0 |
| Spring Hill | | – | | 6 | – | 1 | – | 0 |
| North Texas State Normal | | – | | 5 | – | 1 | – | 1 |
| Sam Houston Normal | | – | | 5 | – | 1 | – | 1 |
| West Virginia | | – | | 5 | – | 1 | – | 1 |
| Jonesboro Aggies | | – | | 4 | – | 1 | – | 1 |
| Johns Hopkins | | – | | 6 | – | 2 | – | 0 |
| VMI | | – | | 6 | – | 2 | – | 1 |
| Southwestern Louisiana Industrial | | – | | 5 | – | 2 | – | 1 |
| Delaware | | – | | 6 | – | 3 | – | 0 |
| Maryland | | – | | 6 | – | 3 | – | 0 |
| Louisiana Normal College | | – | | 4 | – | 2 | – | 0 |
| Southwest Texas State | | – | | 5 | – | 3 | – | 2 |
| Davidson | | – | | 4 | – | 3 | – | 1 |
| Mississippi Normal | | – | | 4 | – | 3 | – | 0 |
| West Tennessee State Normal | | – | | 4 | – | 3 | – | 0 |
| Guilford | | – | | 1 | – | 1 | – | 0 |
| Middle Tennessee State Normal | | – | | 3 | – | 3 | – | 1 |
| Birmingham | | – | | 2 | – | 2 | – | 1 |
| Presbyterian | | – | | 4 | – | 4 | – | 0 |
| Henderson-Brown | | – | | 3 | – | 4 | – | 1 |
| TCU | | – | | 4 | – | 5 | – | 0 |
| Southwestern Presbyterian | | – | | 3 | – | 4 | – | 0 |
| Wake Forest | | – | | 3 | – | 4 | – | 0 |
| Navy | | – | | 3 | – | 5 | – | 1 |
| Western Kentucky State Normal | | – | | 1 | – | 4 | – | 2 |
| Louisville | | – | | 1 | – | 5 | – | 1 |
| Marshall | | – | | 1 | – | 7 | – | 0 |
| Cumberland (TN) | | – | | 0 | – | 6 | – | 1 |

The 1915 Southwestern Presbyterian football team represented Southwestern Presbyterian—now known as Rhodes College as an independent during the 1915 college football season. Led by head coach Benton L. Boykin, the team compiled a record of 3–4. Southwestern Presbyterian played home games at Shearer Field in Clarksville, Tennessee.

== Schedule ==
| Date | Opponent | Site | Result | Attendance | Source |
|---|---|---|---|---|---|
| October 2 | at Vanderbilt | Dudley Field; Nashville, TN | L 0–47 | | |
| October 9 | at Ole Miss | Hemingway Stadium; Oxford, MS | L 6–13 | | |
| October 13 | vs. Transylvania | Athletic Park; Nashville, TN | L 0–27 | | |
| October 22 | Cumberland (TN) | Shearer Field; Clarksville, TN | W 30–0 | | |
| October 30 | Bethel (KY) | Shearer Field; Clarksville, TN | W 66–0 | | |
| November 12 or 13 | Kentucky Wesleyan | Shearer Field; Clarksville, TN | W 66–7 or 67–7 | | |
| November 19 | at Middle Tennessee State Normal | Murfreesboro, TN | L 7–14 | | |
