= 1915 Cumberland Bulldogs football team =

American college football season

1915 Cumberland Bulldogs football
- Conference: Independent
- Record: 0–6–1
- Head coach: J. C. Anderson (1st season)
- Captain: Rogers

1915 Southern college football independents records
	Conf.			Overall
Team	W	L	T	W		L		T
Georgia Tech		–		7	–	0	–	1
Ouachita Baptist		–		7	–	1	–	0
Dallas		–		6	–	1	–	0
Spring Hill		–		6	–	1	–	0
North Texas State Normal		–		5	–	1	–	1
Sam Houston Normal		–		5	–	1	–	1
West Virginia		–		5	–	1	–	1
Jonesboro Aggies		–		4	–	1	–	1
Johns Hopkins		–		6	–	2	–	0
VMI		–		6	–	2	–	1
Southwestern Louisiana Industrial		–		5	–	2	–	1
Delaware		–		6	–	3	–	0
Maryland		–		6	–	3	–	0
Louisiana Normal College		–		4	–	2	–	0
Southwest Texas State		–		5	–	3	–	2
Davidson		–		4	–	3	–	1
Mississippi Normal		–		4	–	3	–	0
West Tennessee State Normal		–		4	–	3	–	0
Guilford		–		1	–	1	–	0
Middle Tennessee State Normal		–		3	–	3	–	1
Birmingham		–		2	–	2	–	1
Presbyterian		–		4	–	4	–	0
Henderson-Brown		–		3	–	4	–	1
TCU		–		4	–	5	–	0
Southwestern Presbyterian		–		3	–	4	–	0
Wake Forest		–		3	–	4	–	0
Navy		–		3	–	5	–	1
Western Kentucky State Normal		–		1	–	4	–	2
Louisville		–		1	–	5	–	1
Marshall		–		1	–	7	–	0
Cumberland (TN)		–		0	–	6	–	1

The 1915 Cumberland Bulldogs football team represented Cumberland University as an independent during the 1915 college football season. Led by J. C. Anderson in his first and only season as head coach, the Bulldogs compiled a record of 0–6–1 and failed to score a point. George E. Allen was team manager.

== Schedule ==
Date	Time	Opponent	Site	Result	Attendance	Source
October 2		at Middle Tennessee State Normal	Murfreesboro, TN	T 0–0		
October 9		at Sewanee	Hardee Field; Sewanee, TN	L 0–47		
October 13	4:00 p.m.	at Vanderbilt	Dudley Field; Nashville, TN	L 0–60		
October 22		at Southwestern Presbyterian	Clarksville, TN	L 0–30		
October 23		at Tennessee	Waite Field; Knoxville, TN	L 0–101		
November 6		at South Carolina	Davis Field; Columbia, SC	L 0–68		
November 10		at Wofford	Spartanburg, SC	L 0–2		
