= List of Texas State Bobcats head football coaches =

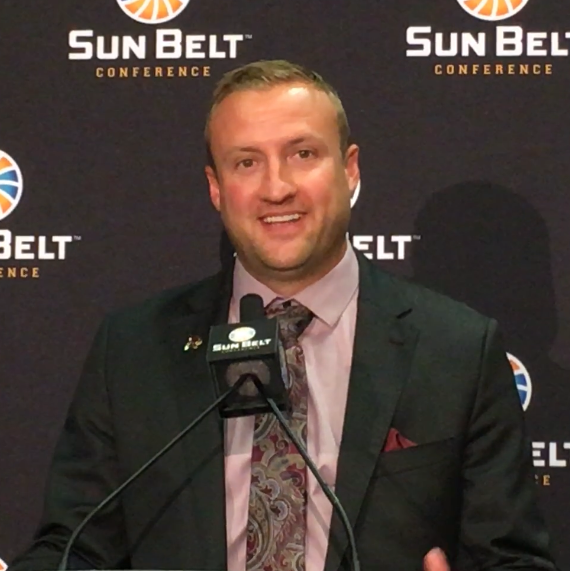
Jake Spavital served as the head coach of the Texas State Bobcats from 2019 to 2022.

The Texas State Bobcats college football team represents Texas State University as a member of the Pac-12 Conference. The Bobcats competes as part of the NCAA Division I Football Bowl Subdivision. The program has had 20 head coaches, and one interim head coach, since it began play during the 1904 season. Since December 2022, G. J. Kinne has served as head coach at Texas State.

== Key ==
Key to symbols in coaches list
General		Overall		Conference		Postseason (Note: Although the first Rose Bowl Game was played in 1902, it has been continuously played since the 1916 game, and is recognized as the oldest bowl game by the NCAA. "—" indicates any season prior to 1916 when postseason games were not played.)	
No.	Order of coaches (Note: A running total of the number of head coaches, with coaches who served separate tenures being counted only once. Interim head coaches are represented with "Int" and are not counted in the running total. "—" indicates the team played but either without a coach or no coach is on record. "X" indicates an interim year without play.)	GC	Games coached	CW	Conference wins	PW	Postseason wins
DC	Division championships	OW	Overall wins	CL	Conference losses	PL	Postseason losses
CC	Conference championships	OL	Overall losses	CT	Conference ties	PT	Postseason ties
NC	National championships	OT	Overall ties (Note: Overtime rules in college football were introduced in 1996, making ties impossible in the period since.)	C%	Conference winning percentage		
†	Elected to the College Football Hall of Fame	O%	Overall winning percentage (Note: When computing the win–loss percentage, a tie counts as half a win and half a loss.)				

== Coaches ==
List of head football coaches showing season(s) coached, overall records, conference records, postseason records, championships and selected awards (Note: Statistics correct as of the end of the 2025 NCAA Division I FBS football season.)
No.	Name (Note: Texas State did not have a head coach for their 1904 or 1908 seasons.)	Term (Note: Texas State did not field teams from 1905–1907, 1909, and from 1943–1945 due to World War II.)	Season(s)	GC	OW	OL	OT	O%	CW	CL	CT	C%	PW	PL	PT	CC	NC	Awards
1	James R. Coxen	1910–1912	3	16	4	10	2	0.313	—	—	—	—	—	—	—	—	0	—
2	C. Spurgeon Smith	1913–1915	3	26	11	13	2	0.462	—	—	—	—	—	—	—	—	0	—
3	G. B. Marsh	1916–1918	3	22	12	6	4	0.636	—	—	—	—	—	—	—	—	0	—
4	Oscar W. Strahan	1919–1934	16	134	72	52	10	0.575	32	29	7	0.522	—	—	—	1	0	—
5	Joe Bailey Cheaney	1935–1942	8	71	23	42	6	0.366	7	22	2	0.258	—	—	—	0	0	—
6	George Vest	1946–1950	5	50	30	17	3	0.630	15	9	0	0.625	—	—	—	1	0	—
7	Milton Jowers	1951–1953; 1961–1964	3, 4	68	48	18	2	0.721	27	12	2	0.683	—	—	—	1	0	—
8	R. W. Parker	1954–1959	6	58	31	24	3	0.560	23	15	1	0.603	—	—	—	2	0	—
9	Jack Henry	1960	1	10	2	8	0	0.200	1	6	0	0.143	—	—	—	0	0	—
10	Bill Miller	1965–1978	14	140	86	51	3	0.625	65	41	2	0.611	—	—	—	1	0	—
11	Jim Wacker	1979–1982	4	50	42	8	0	0.840	22	6	0	0.579	6	0	0	3	2 – 1981, 1982	—
12	John O'Hara	1983–1989	7	77	36	41	0	0.468	18	21	0	0.462	0	0	0	1	0	—
13	Dennis Franchione	1990–1991; 2011–2015	2, 5	82	39	43	0	0.476	17	24	0	0.415	0	0	0	0	0	—
14	Jim Bob Helduser	1992–1996	5	55	20	34	1	0.373	8	22	1	0.274	0	0	0	0	0	—
15	Bob DeBesse	1997–2002	6	66	26	40	—	0.394	12	28	—	0.300	0	0	—	0	0	—
16	Manny Matsakis	2003	1	12	5	7	—	0.417	2	3	—	0.400	0	0	—	0	0	—
17	David Bailiff	2004–2006	3	36	21	15	—	0.583	10	6	—	0.625	2	1	—	1	0	—
18	Brad Wright	2007–2010	4	46	23	23	—	0.500	14	14	—	0.500	0	1	—	0	0	—
19	Everett Withers	2016–2018	3	35	7	28	—	0.200	2	21	—	0.087	0	0	—	0	0	—
Int	Chris Woods	2018	1	1	0	1	—	.000	0	1	—	.000	0	0	—	0	0	—
20	Jake Spavital	2019–2022	4	48	13	35	—	0.271	9	23	—	0.281	0	0	—	0	0	—
21	G. J. Kinne	2023–present	3	39	23	16	—	0.590	12	12	—	0.500	3	0	—	0	0	—
