= Richard B. Dunbar =

American civil engineer (1886–1968)

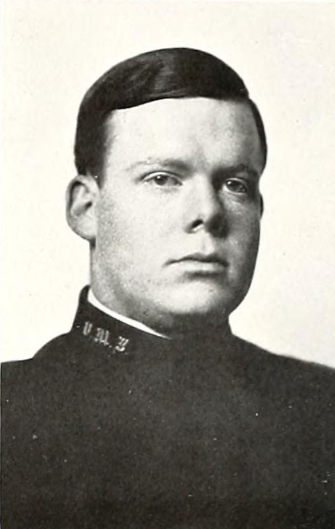
- Dunbar pictured in The Bomb 1908, VMI yearbook

Biographical details
- Born: April 1, 1886
- Died: November 12, 1968 (aged 82); Fort Worth, Texas, U.S.

Playing career
- 1904–1907: VMI
- Position: Guard

Coaching career (HC unless noted)
- 1914–1915: Southwestern Louisiana Industrial

Head coaching record
- Overall: 10–5–1

Richard Battaille Dunbar (April 1, 1886 – November 12, 1968) was an American college football player and coach, military officer, and civil engineer. He served as head football coach at Southwestern Louisiana Industrial Institute—now known as the University of Louisiana at Lafayette—for two seasons, from 1914 to 1915, and compiling a record of 10–5–1.

Dunbar was born on April 1, 1886. A native of Augusta, Kentucky, he attended the Virginia Military Institute (VMI), where he played football as a guard before graduating in 1908 with an engineering degree. At VMI, he was a classmate of George S. Patton. During World War I, Dunbar served with the United States Army Corps of Engineers in France. In World War II, Dunbar commanded the 343rd Combat Engineer Regiment in North Africa, Italy, France, and Germany. He spent 39 months serving in the European Theater of Operations (ETO). A 1,500-foot bridge constructed over the Rhine in Germany during the war was named in his honor. Between the two world wars, Dunbar worked as a civil engineer.

Dunbar moved to Fort Worth, Texas in 1919. He died at a hospital there, on November 12, 1968, following a long illness.

== Head coaching record ==
Year	Team	Overall	Conference	Standing	Bowl/playoffs
Southwestern Louisiana Industrial (Independent) (1914–1915)
1914	Southwestern Louisiana Industrial	5–3			
1915	Southwestern Louisiana Industrial	5–2–1			
Southwestern Louisiana Industrial:		10–5–1			
Total:		10–5–1			
