= 1914 Mississippi Normal Normalites football team =

American college football season

1914 Mississippi Normal Normalites football
- Conference: Independent
- Record: 2–3–1
- Head coach: A. B. Dille (1st season)
- Home stadium: Kamper Park

1914 Southern college football independents records
	Conf.			Overall
Team	W	L	T	W		L		T
Texas		–		8	–	0	–	0
Middle Tennessee State Normal		–		5	–	0	–	1
Oklahoma		–		9	–	1	–	1
Delaware		–		7	–	1	–	1
Davidson		–		5	–	1	–	1
Birmingham		–		3	–	1	–	1
Georgia Tech		–		6	–	2	–	0
Presbyterian		–		4	–	1	–	1
Oklahoma A&M		–		6	–	2	–	1
Navy		–		6	–	3	–	0
Maryland		–		5	–	3	–	0
Southwestern Louisiana Industrial		–		5	–	3	–	0
Howard (AL)		–		4	–	3	–	1
Maryville (TN)		–		6	–	4	–	0
Sam Houston Normal		–		3	–	2	–	0
Marshall		–		5	–	4	–	0
West Virginia		–		5	–	4	–	0
Rice		–		3	–	2	–	3
North Texas State Normal		–		3	–	3	–	0
South Carolina		–		5	–	5	–	1
VMI		–		4	–	4	–	0
Mississippi Normal		–		2	–	3	–	1
Texas Mines		–		2	–	3	–	0
Western Kentucky State Normal		–		1	–	2	–	0
Baylor		–		3	–	5	–	2
West Tennessee State Normal		–		3	–	5	–	0
Arkansas		–		3	–	6	–	0
Louisiana Industrial		–		2	–	4	–	0
Wake Forest		–		3	–	6	–	0
Furman		–		2	–	5	–	0
Southwest Texas State		–		2	–	6	–	0
Stetson		–		1	–	4	–	0
Louisville		–		1	–	7	–	0
Catholic University		–		0	–	6	–	1

The 1914 Mississippi Normal Normalites football team was an American football team that represented Mississippi Normal College (now known as the University of Southern Mississippi) as an independent during the 1914 college football season. In their first year under head coach A. B. Dille, the team compiled a 2–3–1 record.

== Schedule ==
Date	Opponent	Site	Result	Source
October 2	at Mississippi College	Clinton, MS	L 0–40	
October 17	at Spring Hill	Mobile, AL	L 13–24	
October 24	Mobile Military Academy	Kamper Park; Hattiesburg, MS	W 24–0	
October 31	at Gulf Coast Military Academy	Gulfport, MS	L 0–19	
November 7	Perkinston High School	Kamper Park; Hattiesburg, MS	W 9–0	
November 14	Poplarville High School	Kamper Park; Hattiesburg, MS	T 0–0	
