= 1914 North Texas State Normal football team =

American college football season

1914 North Texas State Normal football
- Conference: Independent
- Record: 3–3
- Head coach: J. W. Pender (2nd season)
- Home stadium: Eagle Field

1914 Southern college football independents records
	Conf.			Overall
Team	W	L	T	W		L		T
Texas		–		8	–	0	–	0
Middle Tennessee State Normal		–		5	–	0	–	1
Oklahoma		–		9	–	1	–	1
Delaware		–		7	–	1	–	1
Davidson		–		5	–	1	–	1
Birmingham		–		3	–	1	–	1
Georgia Tech		–		6	–	2	–	0
Presbyterian		–		4	–	1	–	1
Oklahoma A&M		–		6	–	2	–	1
Navy		–		6	–	3	–	0
Maryland		–		5	–	3	–	0
Southwestern Louisiana Industrial		–		5	–	3	–	0
Howard (AL)		–		4	–	3	–	1
Maryville (TN)		–		6	–	4	–	0
Sam Houston Normal		–		3	–	2	–	0
Marshall		–		5	–	4	–	0
West Virginia		–		5	–	4	–	0
Rice		–		3	–	2	–	3
North Texas State Normal		–		3	–	3	–	0
South Carolina		–		5	–	5	–	1
VMI		–		4	–	4	–	0
Mississippi Normal		–		2	–	3	–	1
Texas Mines		–		2	–	3	–	0
Western Kentucky State Normal		–		1	–	2	–	0
Baylor		–		3	–	5	–	2
West Tennessee State Normal		–		3	–	5	–	0
Arkansas		–		3	–	6	–	0
Louisiana Industrial		–		2	–	4	–	0
Wake Forest		–		3	–	6	–	0
Furman		–		2	–	5	–	0
Southwest Texas State		–		2	–	6	–	0
Stetson		–		1	–	4	–	0
Louisville		–		1	–	7	–	0
Catholic University		–		0	–	6	–	1

The 1914 North Texas State Normal football team represented North Texas State Normal College (now known as the University of North Texas) as an independent during the 1914 college football season. Led by second-year head coach J. W. Pender, the squad compiled an overall record of 3–3.

== Schedule ==
Date	Opponent	Site	Result	Source
September 26	at TCU	University gridiron; Fort Worth, TX	L 0–40	
October 30	at Southeastern Oklahoma Normal	Durant, OK	L 0–39	
November 3	Burleson	Eagle Field; Denton, TX	W 25–0	
November 14	at Dallas	Dallas, TX	W 14–2	
November 21	Terrell Academy	Eagle Field; Denton, TX	L 0–6	
November 26	Sam Houston Normal	Eagle Field; Denton, TX	W 18–0	
