= 1914 Middle Tennessee State Normal football team =

American college football season

1914 Middle Tennessee State Normal football
- Conference: Independent
- Record: 5–0–1
- Head coach: Alfred B. Miles (2nd season)
- Captain: W. E. Ragland
- Home stadium: none

1914 Southern college football independents records
	Conf.			Overall
Team	W	L	T	W		L		T
Texas		–		8	–	0	–	0
Middle Tennessee State Normal		–		5	–	0	–	1
Oklahoma		–		9	–	1	–	1
Delaware		–		7	–	1	–	1
Davidson		–		5	–	1	–	1
Birmingham		–		3	–	1	–	1
Georgia Tech		–		6	–	2	–	0
Presbyterian		–		4	–	1	–	1
Oklahoma A&M		–		6	–	2	–	1
Navy		–		6	–	3	–	0
Maryland		–		5	–	3	–	0
Southwestern Louisiana Industrial		–		5	–	3	–	0
Howard (AL)		–		4	–	3	–	1
Maryville (TN)		–		6	–	4	–	0
Sam Houston Normal		–		3	–	2	–	0
Marshall		–		5	–	4	–	0
West Virginia		–		5	–	4	–	0
Rice		–		3	–	2	–	3
North Texas State Normal		–		3	–	3	–	0
South Carolina		–		5	–	5	–	1
VMI		–		4	–	4	–	0
Mississippi Normal		–		2	–	3	–	1
Texas Mines		–		2	–	3	–	0
Western Kentucky State Normal		–		1	–	2	–	0
Baylor		–		3	–	5	–	2
West Tennessee State Normal		–		3	–	5	–	0
Arkansas		–		3	–	6	–	0
Louisiana Industrial		–		2	–	4	–	0
Wake Forest		–		3	–	6	–	0
Furman		–		2	–	5	–	0
Southwest Texas State		–		2	–	6	–	0
Stetson		–		1	–	4	–	0
Louisville		–		1	–	7	–	0
Catholic University		–		0	–	6	–	1

The 1914 Middle Tennessee State Normal football team represented the Middle Tennessee State Normal School (now known as Middle Tennessee State University) during the 1914 college football season. The team captain was W. E. Ragland.

== Schedule ==
Date	Opponent	Site	Result
September 19	at Cumberland (KY)	Williamsburg, KY	T 0–0
September 26	Vanderbilt "B"	Murfreesboro, TN	W 9–6
October 3	Morgan	Murfreesboro, TN	W 30–0
October 10	Western Kentucky State Normal	Murfreesboro, TN (rivalry)	W 47–0
October 17	Castle Heights Military Institute	Murfreesboro, TN	W 21–7
October 24	Vanderbilt School of Medicine	Murfreesboro, TN	W 25–0
