= 1914 Texas Mines Miners football team =

American college football season

1914 Texas Mines Miners football
- Conference: Independent
- Record: 2–3
- Head coach: Tommy Dwyer (1st season)

1914 Southern college football independents records
	Conf.			Overall
Team	W	L	T	W		L		T
Texas		–		8	–	0	–	0
Middle Tennessee State Normal		–		5	–	0	–	1
Oklahoma		–		9	–	1	–	1
Delaware		–		7	–	1	–	1
Davidson		–		5	–	1	–	1
Birmingham		–		3	–	1	–	1
Georgia Tech		–		6	–	2	–	0
Presbyterian		–		4	–	1	–	1
Oklahoma A&M		–		6	–	2	–	1
Navy		–		6	–	3	–	0
Maryland		–		5	–	3	–	0
Southwestern Louisiana Industrial		–		5	–	3	–	0
Howard (AL)		–		4	–	3	–	1
Maryville (TN)		–		6	–	4	–	0
Sam Houston Normal		–		3	–	2	–	0
Marshall		–		5	–	4	–	0
West Virginia		–		5	–	4	–	0
Rice		–		3	–	2	–	3
North Texas State Normal		–		3	–	3	–	0
South Carolina		–		5	–	5	–	1
VMI		–		4	–	4	–	0
Mississippi Normal		–		2	–	3	–	1
Texas Mines		–		2	–	3	–	0
Western Kentucky State Normal		–		1	–	2	–	0
Baylor		–		3	–	5	–	2
West Tennessee State Normal		–		3	–	5	–	0
Arkansas		–		3	–	6	–	0
Louisiana Industrial		–		2	–	4	–	0
Wake Forest		–		3	–	6	–	0
Furman		–		2	–	5	–	0
Southwest Texas State		–		2	–	6	–	0
Stetson		–		1	–	4	–	0
Louisville		–		1	–	7	–	0
Catholic University		–		0	–	6	–	1

The 1914 Texas Mines Miners football team was the first intercollegiate American football team to represent Texas School of Mines (now known as the University of Texas at El Paso). During the 1914 college football season, the team was coached by Tommy Dwyer, compiled a 2–3 record, and was outscored by a total of 64 to 34.

The first intercollegiate game was a 19–0 loss to New Mexico A&M. The series with New Mexico A&M evolved into a rivalry (now known as the Battle of I-10) that has been played almost 100 times.

== Schedule ==
Date	Opponent	Site	Result	Source
October 24	YMCA	El Paso, TX	W 7–6	
October 31	at New Mexico A&M	Las Cruces, NM (rivalry)	L 0–19	
November 7	at New Mexico Military	Roswell, NM	L 0–19	
November 14	20th Infantry	Washington Park; El Paso, TX	W 27–0	
November 26	at El Paso High School	El Paso High School field; El Paso, TX	L 0–20	
