= J. C. Anderson =

American football player and coach

Playing career
- 1903: Cumberland (TN)
- Position: Halfback

Coaching career (HC unless noted)
- 1915: Cumberland (TN)

Head coaching record
- Overall: 0–6–1

Accomplishments and honors

Awards
- All-Southern (1903)

J. C. "Dog" Anderson was an American college football player and coach for Cumberland College in Tennessee. He was a halfback on the 1903 team, and was selected All-Southern. He coached the scoreless 1915 team.

== Head coaching record ==
Year	Team	Overall	Conference	Standing	Bowl/playoffs
Cumberland Bulldogs (Southern Intercollegiate Athletic Association) (1915)
1915	Cumberland	0–6–1			
Cumberland:		0–6–1			
Total:		0–6–1			
