= Tommy Dwyer (American football) =

American sports coach and civil engineer (1889–1959)

Biographical details
- Born: September 17, 1889; El Paso, Texas, U.S.
- Died: July 29, 1959 (aged 69); Fort Worth, Texas, U.S.

Playing career

Football
- 1908–1910: Texas A&M

Coaching career (HC unless noted)

Football
- 1914–1919: Texas Mines

Basketball
- 1914–1923: Texas Mines

Head coaching record
- Overall: 9–11–1 (football); 14–30 (basketball)

Thomas Joe Dwyer (September 17, 1889 – July 29, 1959) was an American football, basketball, and baseball coach and civil engineer. He played football for Texas A&M University and was the first football coach at the Texas School of Mines (now known as the University of Texas at El Paso) coaching the team from 1914 to 1919 and compiling record of 9–11–1. He served in the United States Army during World War I and later worked for 29 years as a civil engineer for Gulf Oil.

== Early years ==
Dwyer was a native of El Paso, Texas. He attended Texas A&M College where he played football and graduated with a degree in engineering.

== Texas Mines and wartime service ==
In 1914, upon the creation of the Texas School of Mines (later renamed the University of Texas at El Paso), Dwyer joined the faculty and became the assistant to John W. "Cap" Kidd, the head of the engineering department. He taught calculus at the school.

Dwyer was also appointed as the school's first football coach. Under his leadership, the 1914 Texas Mines Miners football team became the school's first football team. The first intercollegiate game was a 19–0 loss to New Mexico A&M. The series with New Mexico A&M evolved into a rivalry (now known as the Battle of I-10) that has been played almost 100 times. In an era when eligibility rules were laxly enforced, Dwyer also occasionally played for the Texas Mines teams that he coached. Dwyer continued as Texas Mines' head football coach from 1914 through 1917 and in 1919. He also coached the Texas Mines baseball team.

During World War I, Dwyer served in the United States Army as a captain with the 116th Engineer Regiment, which was part of the 41st "Rainbow" Division in France. Texas Mines did not field a team during Dwyer's absence in 1918.

== Family and later years ==
Dwyer later had a career as a civil engineer, working in the oil business. He was employed for 29 years by Gulf Oil. In 1928, he was assigned Gulf's new operation center in Odessa, Texas. He was transferred in 1946 to Gulf's Fort Worth offices. He became the chief engineer at the company's Fort Worth operation until his retirement in 1954.

Dwyer married Agnes Wood in September 1923 in a ceremony in El Paso. They had two children, Agnes Barbara (born 1930) and Tom Verne (born 1933). Dwyer died in 1959 at Harris Hospital in Fort Worth. The primary cause of death was hepatoma.

== Head coaching record ==
=== Football ===
Year	Team	Overall	Conference	Standing	Bowl/playoffs
Texas Mines Miners (Independent) (1914–1917)
1914	Texas Mines	2–3			
1915	Texas Mines	3–2			
1916	Texas Mines	2–3			
1917	Texas Mines	0–0–1			
1918	No team—World War I				
1919	Texas Mines	2–4			
Texas Mines:		9–11–1			
Total:		9–11–1			
