= 1928 Columbia Lions football team =

American college football season

1928 Columbia Lions football
- Conference: Independent
- Record: 5–3–1
- Head coach: Charles Crowley (4th season)
- Captain: Bill Adler
- Home stadium: Baker Field

1928 Eastern college football independents records
	Conf.			Overall
Team	W	L	T	W		L		T
Boston College		–		9	–	0	–	0
West Chester		–		8	–	0	–	0
Villanova		–		7	–	0	–	1
Brown		–		8	–	1	–	0
No. 11 Penn		–		8	–	1	–	0
No. 6 Carnegie Tech		–		7	–	1	–	0
No. 9 Army		–		8	–	2	–	0
Drexel		–		8	–	2	–	0
No. 10 NYU		–		8	–	2	–	0
Temple		–		7	–	1	–	2
Lafayette		–		6	–	1	–	2
Princeton		–		5	–	1	–	2
CCNY		–		4	–	1	–	2
Pittsburgh		–		6	–	2	–	1
Harvard		–		5	–	2	–	1
Tufts		–		5	–	2	–	1
Colgate		–		6	–	3	–	0
Rutgers		–		6	–	3	–	0
Bucknell		–		5	–	2	–	3
Columbia		–		5	–	3	–	1
Boston University		–		3	–	3	–	2
Cornell		–		3	–	3	–	2
Syracuse		–		4	–	4	–	1
Yale		–		4	–	4	–	0
Fordham		–		4	–	5	–	0
Franklin & Marshall		–		4	–	5	–	0
Penn State		–		3	–	5	–	1
Lehigh		–		3	–	6	–	0
Washington & Jefferson		–		2	–	5	–	2
Providence		–		1	–	5	–	3
Vermont		–		1	–	7	–	2
Rankings from Dickinson System

The 1928 Columbia Lions football team was an American football team that represented Columbia University as an independent during the 1928 college football season. In its fourth season under head coach Charles Crowley, the team compiled a 5–3–1 record and outscored opponents 132 to 95. The team played its home games at Baker Field in Upper Manhattan.

== Schedule ==
Date	Opponent	Site	Result	Attendance	Source
September 29	Vermont	Baker Field; New York, NY	W 20–0	10,000	
October 6	Union (NY)	Baker Field; New York, NY	W 27–0		
October 13	Wesleyan	Baker Field; New York, NY	W 31–7		
October 20	at Dartmouth	Memorial Field; Hanover, NH	L 7–21		
October 27	Williams	Baker Field; New York, NY	W 20–6		
November 3	Cornell	Baker Field; New York, NY (rivalry)	T 0–0	22,000	
November 10	Johns Hopkins	Baker Field; New York, NY	W 14–13		
November 17	at Penn	Franklin Field; Philadelphia, PA	L 7–34	45,000	
November 29	Syracuse	Baker Field; New York, NY	L 6–14	35,000	
