= Charles Crowley (American football) =

American football player and coach

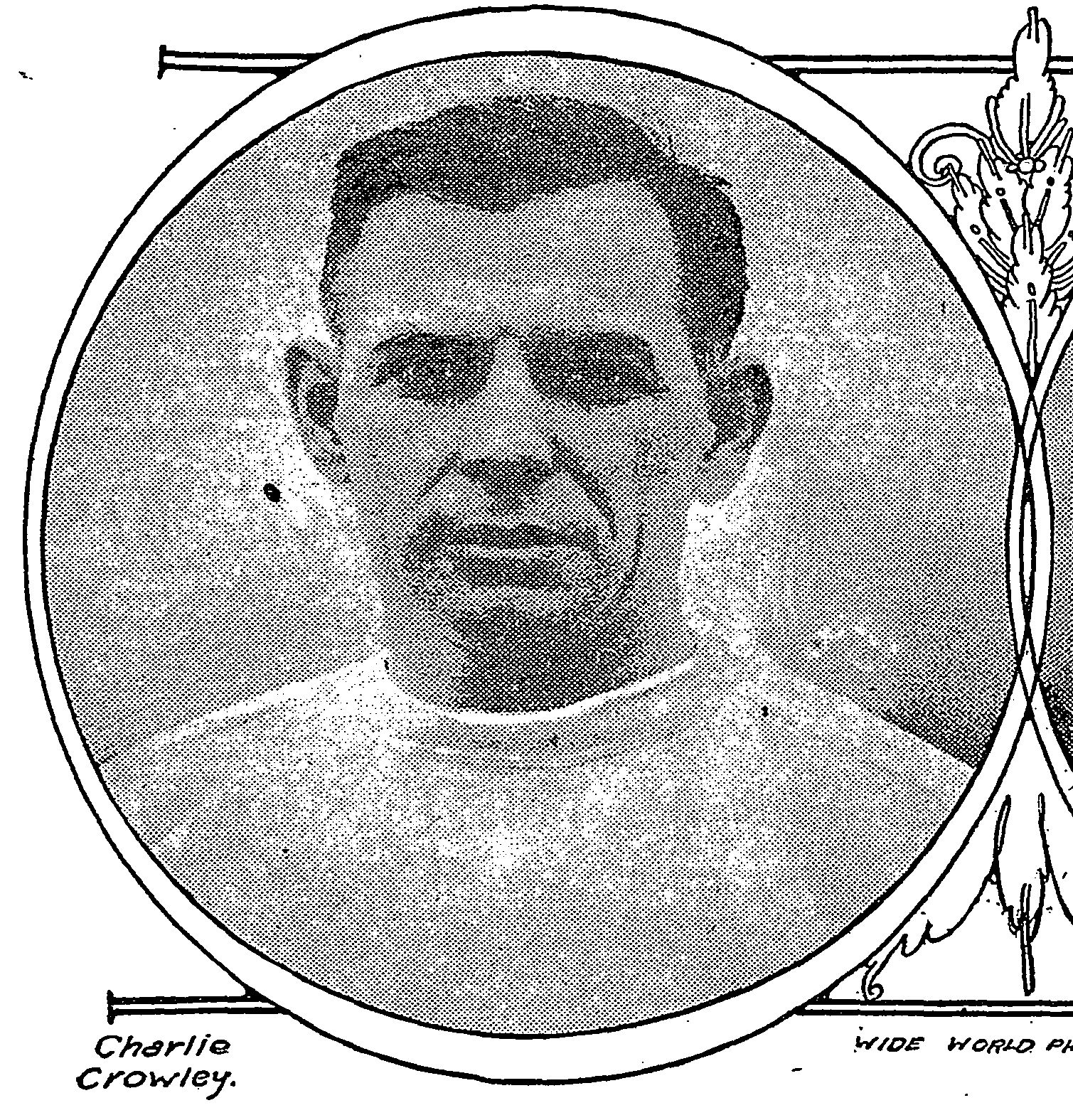
- Crowley in 1925

Biographical details
- Born: c. 1887
- Died: November 3, 1954 (aged 67); Cambridge, Massachusetts, U.S.

Playing career
- 1907–1908: Harvard
- 1910–1912: Notre Dame
- Position: End

Coaching career (HC unless noted)
- 1913–1916: Dallas
- 1921–1922: Harvard (assistant)
- 1923–1924: Columbia (ends)
- 1925–1929: Columbia

Head coaching record
- Overall: 44–21–6

Charles Francis Crowley (c. 1887 – November 3, 1954) was an American college football player and coach. He played at Harvard University and the University of Notre Dame. Crowley served as football head coach at the University of Dallas from 1913 to 1916 and Columbia University from 1925 to 1929. His four-year tenure at the University of Dallas produced school records in wins (18) and winning percentage (.760). The 1915 season brought Dallas the independent championship of the Southwest and a 6–1 record. Crowley was commissioned by the United States Army as a field artillery officer during World War I in France. Crowley lead Columbia to a 26–16–4 record in five seasons as head coach.

A native of Cambridge, Massachusetts, Crowley attended Cambridge Rindge and Latin School before earning a A.B. degree from Harvard in 1911 and Bachelor of Laws degree from Notre Dame Law School in 1913. He later worked as lawyer for the Veterans Administration in Boston and as a realtor in Cambridge. Crowley died at the age of 67, on November 3, 1954, at his home in Cambridge.

== Head coaching record ==
Year	Team	Overall	Conference	Standing	Bowl/playoffs
Dallas Hilltoppers (Independent) (1913–1916)
1913	Dallas				
1914	Dallas				
1915	Dallas	6–1			
1916	Dallas				
Dallas:		18–5–2			
Columbia Lions (Independent) (1925–1929)
1925	Columbia	6–3–1			
1926	Columbia	6–3			
1927	Columbia	5–2–2			
1928	Columbia	5–3–1			
1929	Columbia	4–5			
Columbia:		26–16–4			
Total:		44–21–6			
