= 1914 Southwest Texas State football team =

American College Football Season

1914 Southwest Texas State football
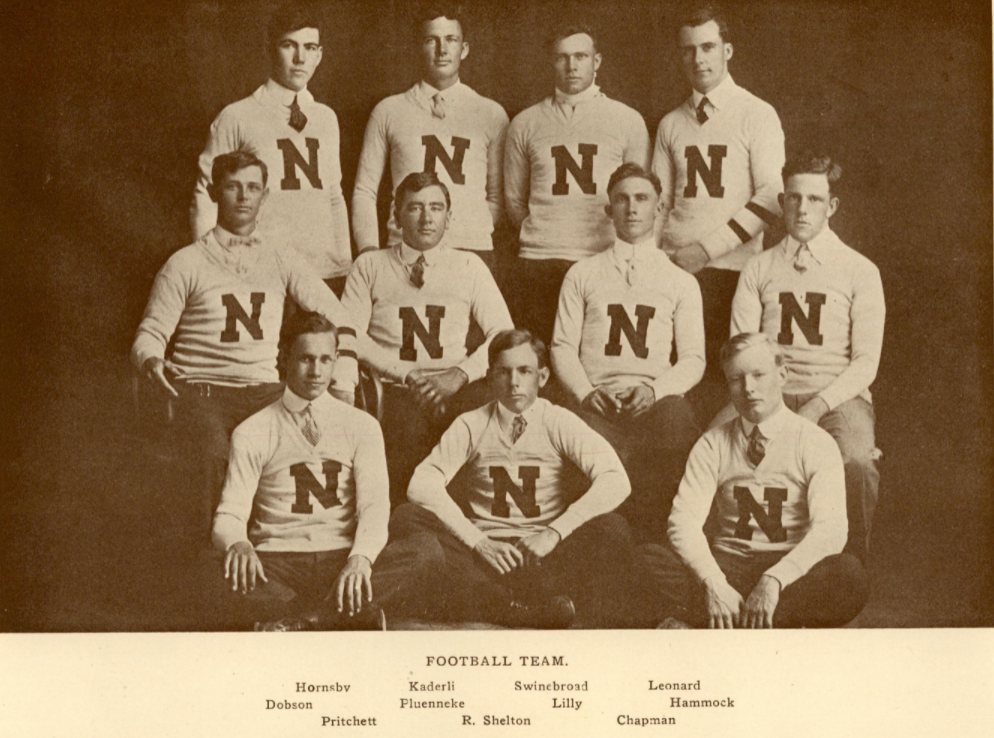
- Conference: Independent
- Record: 2–6
- Head coach: C. Spurgeon Smith (2nd season)
- Captain: Raydo Leonard

1914 Southern college football independents records
	Conf.			Overall
Team	W	L	T	W		L		T
Texas		–		8	–	0	–	0
Middle Tennessee State Normal		–		5	–	0	–	1
Oklahoma		–		9	–	1	–	1
Delaware		–		7	–	1	–	1
Davidson		–		5	–	1	–	1
Birmingham		–		3	–	1	–	1
Georgia Tech		–		6	–	2	–	0
Presbyterian		–		4	–	1	–	1
Oklahoma A&M		–		6	–	2	–	1
Navy		–		6	–	3	–	0
Maryland		–		5	–	3	–	0
Southwestern Louisiana Industrial		–		5	–	3	–	0
Howard (AL)		–		4	–	3	–	1
Maryville (TN)		–		6	–	4	–	0
Sam Houston Normal		–		3	–	2	–	0
Marshall		–		5	–	4	–	0
West Virginia		–		5	–	4	–	0
Rice		–		3	–	2	–	3
North Texas State Normal		–		3	–	3	–	0
South Carolina		–		5	–	5	–	1
VMI		–		4	–	4	–	0
Mississippi Normal		–		2	–	3	–	1
Texas Mines		–		2	–	3	–	0
Western Kentucky State Normal		–		1	–	2	–	0
Baylor		–		3	–	5	–	2
West Tennessee State Normal		–		3	–	5	–	0
Arkansas		–		3	–	6	–	0
Louisiana Industrial		–		2	–	4	–	0
Wake Forest		–		3	–	6	–	0
Furman		–		2	–	5	–	0
Southwest Texas State		–		2	–	6	–	0
Stetson		–		1	–	4	–	0
Louisville		–		1	–	7	–	0
Catholic University		–		0	–	6	–	1

The 1914 Southwest Texas State football team used to be an American football team that represented Southwest Texas State Normal School—now known as Texas State University–as an independent during the 1914 college football season. The team was led by first-year head coach C. Spurgeon Smith and finished the season with a record of 2–6. The team's captain was Raydo Leonard, who played halfback.

== Schedule ==
Date	Opponent	Site	Result	Source
October 2	San Marcos High School	San Marcos, TX	L 0–7	
October 10	at St. Edward's	St. Edward's Field; Austin, TX	L 0–53	
October 19	San Marcos Baptist Academy	San Marcos, TX	L 0–20	
November 2	Deaf and Dumb Institution	San Marcos, TX	W 24–2	
November 9	at Cuero High School	Cuero, TX	L 0–32	
November 20	Coronal Institute	San Marcos, TX	L 6–26	
November 23	Austin Academy	San Marcos, TX	W 13–0	
November 30	San Marcos Baptist Academy	San Marcos, TX	L 6–26	
