= 1914 Sam Houston Normal football team =

American college football season

1914 Sam Houston Normal football
- Conference: Independent
- Record: 3–2
- Head coach: Gene Berry (1st season)
- Captain: Bronson Hayes

1914 Southern college football independents records
| | Conf. | | | Overall |
| Team | W | L | T | W | | L | | T |
|---|---|---|---|---|---|---|---|---|
| Texas | | – | | 8 | – | 0 | – | 0 |
| Middle Tennessee State Normal | | – | | 5 | – | 0 | – | 1 |
| Oklahoma | | – | | 9 | – | 1 | – | 1 |
| Delaware | | – | | 7 | – | 1 | – | 1 |
| Davidson | | – | | 5 | – | 1 | – | 1 |
| Birmingham | | – | | 3 | – | 1 | – | 1 |
| Georgia Tech | | – | | 6 | – | 2 | – | 0 |
| Presbyterian | | – | | 4 | – | 1 | – | 1 |
| Oklahoma A&M | | – | | 6 | – | 2 | – | 1 |
| Navy | | – | | 6 | – | 3 | – | 0 |
| Maryland | | – | | 5 | – | 3 | – | 0 |
| Southwestern Louisiana Industrial | | – | | 5 | – | 3 | – | 0 |
| Howard (AL) | | – | | 4 | – | 3 | – | 1 |
| Maryville (TN) | | – | | 6 | – | 4 | – | 0 |
| Sam Houston Normal | | – | | 3 | – | 2 | – | 0 |
| Marshall | | – | | 5 | – | 4 | – | 0 |
| West Virginia | | – | | 5 | – | 4 | – | 0 |
| Rice | | – | | 3 | – | 2 | – | 3 |
| North Texas State Normal | | – | | 3 | – | 3 | – | 0 |
| South Carolina | | – | | 5 | – | 5 | – | 1 |
| VMI | | – | | 4 | – | 4 | – | 0 |
| Mississippi Normal | | – | | 2 | – | 3 | – | 1 |
| Texas Mines | | – | | 2 | – | 3 | – | 0 |
| Western Kentucky State Normal | | – | | 1 | – | 2 | – | 0 |
| Baylor | | – | | 3 | – | 5 | – | 2 |
| West Tennessee State Normal | | – | | 3 | – | 5 | – | 0 |
| Arkansas | | – | | 3 | – | 6 | – | 0 |
| Louisiana Industrial | | – | | 2 | – | 4 | – | 0 |
| Wake Forest | | – | | 3 | – | 6 | – | 0 |
| Furman | | – | | 2 | – | 5 | – | 0 |
| Southwest Texas State | | – | | 2 | – | 6 | – | 0 |
| Stetson | | – | | 1 | – | 4 | – | 0 |
| Louisville | | – | | 1 | – | 7 | – | 0 |
| Catholic University | | – | | 0 | – | 6 | – | 1 |

The 1914 Sam Houston Normal football team represented Sam Houston Normal Institute—now known as Sam Houston State University—as an independent during the 1914 college football season. Led by first-year head coach Gene Berry, Sam Houston Normal compiled a record of 3–2. Quarterback Bronson Hayes, a native of Groveton, Texas, was elected team captain.

== Schedule ==
| Date | Opponent | Site | Result | Source |
|---|---|---|---|---|
| October 12 | Conroe High School | Huntsville, TX | W 18–0 | |
| October 24 | Houston High School | Huntsville, TX | L 0–40 | |
| October 31 | Bryan Baptist | Huntsville, TX | W 20–0 | |
| November 7 | Alexander Institute | Huntsville, TX | W 29–7 | |
| November 26 | at North Texas State Normal | Denton, TX | L 0–18 | |
