= 1915 SMU Mustangs football team =

American college football season

1915 SMU Mustangs football
- Conference: Texas Intercollegiate Athletic Association
- Record: 2–5 ( TIAA)
- Head coach: Ray Morrison (1st season)
- Captain: J. A. Barton
- Home stadium: SMU grounds, Fair Park

The 1915 SMU Mustangs football team represented the Southern Methodist University (SMU) as a member of the Texas Intercollegiate Athletic Association (TIAA) during the 1915 college football season. Led by first-year head coach Ray Morrison, the Mustangs compiled an overall record of 2–5.

== Schedule ==
Date	Time	Opponent	Site	Result	Source
October 9	3:30 p.m.	at TCU	TCU campus; Fort Worth, TX (rivalry)	L 0–43	
October 14		Hendrix	SMU grounds; Dallas, TX	W 13–2	
October 27		Austin	Fair Park; Dallas, TX	L 0–21	
November 4		vs. Dallas	Fair Park; Dallas, TX	W 7–0	
November 12		at Daniel Baker	Brownwood, TX	L 0–30	
November 19		Southwestern (TX)	Dallas, TX	L 0–21	
November 25		at Trinity (TX)	Waxahachie, TX	L 0–14	
All times are in Central time
