= Wilbur C. Smith =

American football coach and university administrator

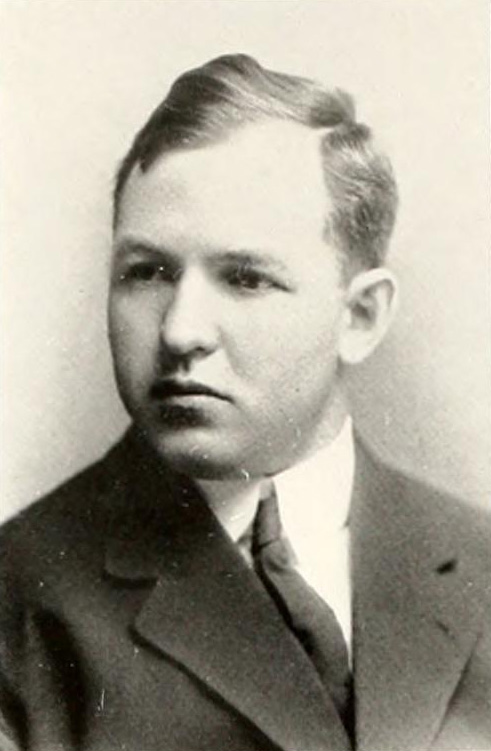

Biographical details
- Born: August 9, 1884; Independence, Kansas, U.S.
- Died: July 3, 1952 (aged 67); New Orleans, Louisiana, U.S.

Coaching career (HC unless noted)
- 1914–1915: Wake Forest

Administrative career (AD unless noted)
- 1922–1945: Tulane

Head coaching record
- Overall: 6–10

Wilbur Cleveland Smith (August 9, 1884 – July 3, 1952) was an American college football coach and university administrator. He served as the head football coach at Wake Forest University from 1914 to 1915, compiling a record of 6–10. Smith was appointed as the athletic director at Tulane University in 1922. He was later dean of Louisiana State University Medical School.

== Head coaching record ==
Year	Team	Overall	Conference	Standing	Bowl/playoffs
Wake Forest Baptists (Independent) (1914–1915)
1914	Wake Forest	3–6			
1915	Wake Forest	3–4			
Wake Forest:		6–10			
Total:		6–10			
