= Clyde H. Wilson =

American sports coach (1889–1959)

Biographical details
- Born: December 28, 1889; Bellbrook, Ohio, U.S.
- Died: November 2, 1959 (aged 69); Knoxville, Tennessee, U.S.

Playing career

Football
- 1908–1909: Miami (OH)

Coaching career (HC unless noted)

Football
- 1910–1911: Eastern Kentucky
- 1912–1915: West Tennessee State Normal

Basketball
- 1909–1912: Eastern Kentucky

Baseball
- 1915–1919: West Tennessee State Normal

Administrative career (AD unless noted)
- 1910–1912: Eastern Kentucky

Head coaching record
- Overall: 11–19–2 (football); 10–11 (basketball); 19–12–1 (baseball)

Clyde Hubert Wilson (December 28, 1889 – November 2, 1959) was an American football, basketball, and baseball coach. He served as the head football coach at Eastern Kentucky University from 1910 to 1911 and at West Tennessee State Normal School—now known as the University of Memphis—from 1912 to 1915, compiling a career college football coaching record of 11–19–2.

Wilson was born on December 28, 1889, in Bellbrook, Ohio. He earned a Bachelor of Science in Education degree from Miami University in Oxford, Ohio, in 1910 and a Master of Science in education from the University of Tennessee in 1917. Wilson was appointed the head of the industrial arts department at the University of Tennessee in 1925. He died on November 2, 1959, at a doctor's office in Knoxville, Tennessee.

== Head coaching record ==
=== Football ===
Year	Team	Overall	Conference	Standing	Bowl/playoffs
Eastern Kentucky Colonels (Independent) (1910–1911)
1910	Eastern Kentucky	1–4			
1911	Eastern Kentucky	1–3–1			
Eastern Kentucky:		2–7–1			
West Tennessee State Normal (Independent) (1912–1915)
1912	West Tennessee State Normal	1–2–1			
1913	West Tennessee State Normal	1–2			
1914	West Tennessee State Normal	3–5			
1915	West Tennessee State Normal	4–3			
West Tennessee State Normal:		9–12–1			
Total:		11–19–2			
