= Alfred B. Miles =

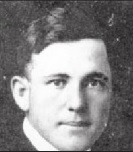

Biographical details
- Born: October 29, 1888; Murfreesboro, Tennessee, U.S.
- Died: March 18, 1962 (aged 73); Nashville, Tennessee, U.S.

Coaching career (HC unless noted)

Football
- 1913–1916: Middle Tennessee State Normal
- 1919–1923: Middle Tennessee State Normal

Basketball
- 1913–1924: Middle Tennessee State Normal

Baseball
- 1913–1924: Middle Tennessee State Normal

Head coaching record
- Overall: 36–14–4 (football); 27–6 (basketball)

Alfred Blackman Miles (October 29, 1888 – March 18, 1962) was an American biology and physiology professor and a football, basketball, and baseball coach for Middle Tennessee State University. He was its second football coach (and first "officially recognized"), second baseball coach, and first basketball coach.

== Early years ==
Miles was born on October 29, 1888, in Murfreesboro, Tennessee, to Caswell Moore Miles and Eliza Howse Blackman. He attended Murfreesboro School for Boys. Miles earned a Bachelor of Science degree from Battle Creek School of Physical Education in Michigan and a master's degree from Springfield College in Springfield, Massachusetts.

== Coaching career and military service ==
The 1914 football season led by Miles was its first undefeated season, with five straight victories after a tie with Cumberland.

The First Fifty Years: A History of Middle Tennessee State College recalls this story of Jess Neely's days playing for Middle Tennessee State Normal and coach Miles: "Jess Neely, a brilliant half-back and a handsome man on the campus, is remembered for his popularity among members of the opposite sex and for an incident that occurred just prior to a football game with Southern Presbyterian in Clarksville. Miles had done an exceptionally good job in mentally preparing his team for the game. He climaxed the pre-game, locker-room exhortation with a soaring call for courage and deathless allegiance to "dear Ol' Normal." Neely was greatly affected by the words of his coach for he leaped to his feet and, roaring like an angry bull, led the team in a rush to the doorway opening to the field. He misjudged the extremely low entrance, and his head received the full impact of the strip of wall above the doorway. He was revived shortly before the kickoff, but he never quite knew where he was, frequently huddling and aligning himself with the enemy." This was said to occur at a point near the 1917 season.

During World War I, he joined the American Expeditionary Forces (AEF) where he served in the 216th Aero Squadron. After training at Kelly Field in Texas, the unit deployed to Europe.

== Late life and death ==
Miles was a professor of physical education at Vanderbilt University from 1924 to 1959. He died of a heart attack, on March 18, 1962, at Park Vista Convalescent Hospital in Nashville, Tennessee.

== Head coaching record ==
=== Football ===
Year	Team	Overall	Conference	Standing	Bowl/playoffs
Middle Tennessee State Normal (Independent) (1913–1916)
1913	Middle Tennessee State Normal	5–1–1			
1914	Middle Tennessee State Normal	5–0–1			
1915	Middle Tennessee State Normal	3–3–1			
1916	Middle Tennessee State Normal	5–2			
Middle Tennessee State Normal (Independent) (1919–1923)
1919	Middle Tennessee State Normal	6–0			
1920	Middle Tennessee State Normal	4–1			
1921	Middle Tennessee State Normal	3–2–1			
1922	Middle Tennessee State Normal	2–6			
1923	Middle Tennessee State Normal	3–1			
Middle Tennessee State Normal:		36–14–4			
Total:		36–14–4			

=== Basketball ===
Record table
Season	Team	Overall	Conference	Standing	Postseason
Middle Tennessee State Normal (Independent) (1913–1915)
1913–14	Middle Tennessee State Normal	1–2			
1914–15	Middle Tennessee State Normal	2–2			
Middle Tennessee State Normal (Independent) (1922–1924)
1922–23	Middle Tennessee State Normal	11–1			
1923–24	Middle Tennessee State Normal	13–1			
Middle Tennessee State Normal:		27–6			
Total:		27–6			
