= 1915 Marshall Thundering Herd football team =

American college football season

1915 Marshall Thundering Herd football
- Conference: Independent
- Record: 1–7
- Head coach: Boyd Chambers (7th season)
- Captain: Bradley Workman
- Home stadium: Central Field

1915 Southern college football independents records
	Conf.			Overall
Team	W	L	T	W		L		T
Georgia Tech		–		7	–	0	–	1
Ouachita Baptist		–		7	–	1	–	0
Dallas		–		6	–	1	–	0
Spring Hill		–		6	–	1	–	0
North Texas State Normal		–		5	–	1	–	1
Sam Houston Normal		–		5	–	1	–	1
West Virginia		–		5	–	1	–	1
Jonesboro Aggies		–		4	–	1	–	1
Johns Hopkins		–		6	–	2	–	0
VMI		–		6	–	2	–	1
Southwestern Louisiana Industrial		–		5	–	2	–	1
Delaware		–		6	–	3	–	0
Maryland		–		6	–	3	–	0
Louisiana Normal College		–		4	–	2	–	0
Southwest Texas State		–		5	–	3	–	2
Davidson		–		4	–	3	–	1
Mississippi Normal		–		4	–	3	–	0
West Tennessee State Normal		–		4	–	3	–	0
Guilford		–		1	–	1	–	0
Middle Tennessee State Normal		–		3	–	3	–	1
Birmingham		–		2	–	2	–	1
Presbyterian		–		4	–	4	–	0
Henderson-Brown		–		3	–	4	–	1
TCU		–		4	–	5	–	0
Southwestern Presbyterian		–		3	–	4	–	0
Wake Forest		–		3	–	4	–	0
Navy		–		3	–	5	–	1
Western Kentucky State Normal		–		1	–	4	–	2
Louisville		–		1	–	5	–	1
Marshall		–		1	–	7	–	0
Cumberland (TN)		–		0	–	6	–	1

The 1915 Marshall Thundering Herd football team represented Marshall College (now known as Marshall University) as an independent during the 1915 college football season. Marshall posted a 1–7 record, being outscored by its opposition 80–244. Home games were played on a campus field called "Central Field" which is presently Campus Commons.

== Schedule ==
Date	Opponent	Site	Result	Source
October 2	at Denison	Granville, OH	L 0–52	
October 9	at Washington and Lee	Wilson Field; Lexington, VA	L 0–27	
October 16	Marietta	Central Field; Huntington, WV	L 0–20	
October 22	at Central University	Cheek Field; Danville, KY	L 6–10	
October 30	Otterbein	Central Field; Huntington, WV	L 0–18	
November 6	West Virginia	Central Field; Huntington, WV (rivalry)	L 6–92	
November 20	at Ohio	Athens, OH	L 7–18	
November 24	Kentucky Wesleyan^{†}	Central Field; Huntington, WV	W 61–7	
^{†}Homecoming
