= C. Spurgeon Smith =

American football coach, college athletics administrator, and professor

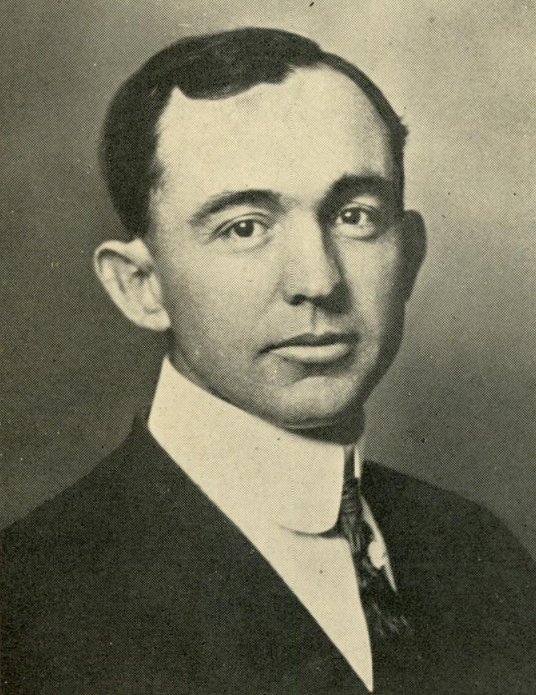
- Smith pictured in The Pedagog 1914, Southwest Texas State yearbook

Biographical details
- Born: August 29, 1886; Columbus, Texas, U.S.
- Died: August 1, 1952 (aged 65); Corpus Christi, Texas, U.S.

Coaching career (HC unless noted)

Football
- 1910–1911: Lockhart HS (TX)
- 1913–1915: Southwest Texas State

Administrative career (AD unless noted)
- 1913–1917: Southwest Texas State

Head coaching record
- Overall: 11–13–2 (college football)

Charles Spurgeon Smith (August 29, 1886 – August 1, 1952) was an American football coach, college athletics administrator, and professor. He served as the head football coach at Southwest Texas State Normal School—now known as Texas State University–from 1913 to 1915, compiling a record of 11–13–2.

Smith was born on August 29, 1886, in Columbus, Texas. He graduated from Baylor University with a Bachelor of Science degree in 1910 and earned a master's degree in 1921 and doctorate in 1928 from the University of Chicago.

Smith began his teaching and coaching career in 1910 at Lockhart High School in Lockhart, Texas, where he was principal, football coach, and a science teacher. He moved to Cuero, Texas in 1912 to take a similar position with a high school there. Smith joined the faculty at Southwest Texas State in 1913 and was appointed head of the biology department around 1915. He trained as a United States Army officer in San Antonio and served as a first lieutenant in the 345th Field Artillery Regiment of the 90th Infantry Division in France during World War I.

Smith died on August 1, 1952, at a hospital in Corpus Christi, Texas.

== Head coaching record ==
=== College football ===
Year	Team	Overall	Conference	Standing	Bowl/playoffs
Southwest Texas State (Independent) (1913–1915)
1913	Southwest Texas State	4–4			
1914	Southwest Texas State	2–6			
1915	Southwest Texas State	5–3–2			
Southwest Texas State:		11–13–2			
Total:		11–13–2			
