= 1915 Dallas Hilltoppers football team =

American college football season

1915 Dallas Hilltoppers football

Southwestern champion
- Conference: Independent
- Record: 6–1
- Head coach: Charles Crowley (3rd season)
- Captain: Cecil Grigg

1915 Southern college football independents records
	Conf.			Overall
Team	W	L	T	W		L		T
Georgia Tech		–		7	–	0	–	1
Ouachita Baptist		–		7	–	1	–	0
Dallas		–		6	–	1	–	0
Spring Hill		–		6	–	1	–	0
North Texas State Normal		–		5	–	1	–	1
Sam Houston Normal		–		5	–	1	–	1
West Virginia		–		5	–	1	–	1
Jonesboro Aggies		–		4	–	1	–	1
Johns Hopkins		–		6	–	2	–	0
VMI		–		6	–	2	–	1
Southwestern Louisiana Industrial		–		5	–	2	–	1
Delaware		–		6	–	3	–	0
Maryland		–		6	–	3	–	0
Louisiana Normal College		–		4	–	2	–	0
Southwest Texas State		–		5	–	3	–	2
Davidson		–		4	–	3	–	1
Mississippi Normal		–		4	–	3	–	0
West Tennessee State Normal		–		4	–	3	–	0
Guilford		–		1	–	1	–	0
Middle Tennessee State Normal		–		3	–	3	–	1
Birmingham		–		2	–	2	–	1
Presbyterian		–		4	–	4	–	0
Henderson-Brown		–		3	–	4	–	1
TCU		–		4	–	5	–	0
Southwestern Presbyterian		–		3	–	4	–	0
Wake Forest		–		3	–	4	–	0
Navy		–		3	–	5	–	1
Western Kentucky State Normal		–		1	–	4	–	2
Louisville		–		1	–	5	–	1
Marshall		–		1	–	7	–	0
Cumberland (TN)		–		0	–	6	–	1

The 1915 Dallas Hilltoppers football team represented the University of Dallas during the 1915 college football season. Led by Charles Crowley in his third season as head coach, the team posted a 6–1 record and claims a Southwestern championship. The team's captain was Cecil Grigg.

== Schedule ==
Date	Opponent	Site	Result	Source
October 2	Britton Training School	Dallas, TX	W 39–7	
October 8	at Austin	Sherman, TX	W 26–0	
October 15	vs. Stamford	West Texas Fair grounds; Abilene, TX	W 31–7	
October 29	Howard Payne	Dallas, TX	W 46–0	
November 4	vs. SMU	Fair Park; Dallas, TX	L 0–7	
November 13	Southeastern Oklahoma Normal	Fair Park gridiron; Dallas, TX	W 6–0	
November 20	North Texas State Normal	Dallas, TX	W 6–0	
