= 1915 Middle Tennessee State Normal football team =

American college football season

1915 Middle Tennessee State Normal football
- Conference: Independent
- Record: 3–3–1
- Head coach: Alfred B. Miles (3rd season)

1915 Southern college football independents records
| | Conf. | | | Overall |
| Team | W | L | T | W | | L | | T |
|---|---|---|---|---|---|---|---|---|
| Georgia Tech | | – | | 7 | – | 0 | – | 1 |
| Ouachita Baptist | | – | | 7 | – | 1 | – | 0 |
| Dallas | | – | | 6 | – | 1 | – | 0 |
| Spring Hill | | – | | 6 | – | 1 | – | 0 |
| North Texas State Normal | | – | | 5 | – | 1 | – | 1 |
| Sam Houston Normal | | – | | 5 | – | 1 | – | 1 |
| West Virginia | | – | | 5 | – | 1 | – | 1 |
| Jonesboro Aggies | | – | | 4 | – | 1 | – | 1 |
| Johns Hopkins | | – | | 6 | – | 2 | – | 0 |
| VMI | | – | | 6 | – | 2 | – | 1 |
| Southwestern Louisiana Industrial | | – | | 5 | – | 2 | – | 1 |
| Delaware | | – | | 6 | – | 3 | – | 0 |
| Maryland | | – | | 6 | – | 3 | – | 0 |
| Louisiana Normal College | | – | | 4 | – | 2 | – | 0 |
| Southwest Texas State | | – | | 5 | – | 3 | – | 2 |
| Davidson | | – | | 4 | – | 3 | – | 1 |
| Mississippi Normal | | – | | 4 | – | 3 | – | 0 |
| West Tennessee State Normal | | – | | 4 | – | 3 | – | 0 |
| Guilford | | – | | 1 | – | 1 | – | 0 |
| Middle Tennessee State Normal | | – | | 3 | – | 3 | – | 1 |
| Birmingham | | – | | 2 | – | 2 | – | 1 |
| Presbyterian | | – | | 4 | – | 4 | – | 0 |
| Henderson-Brown | | – | | 3 | – | 4 | – | 1 |
| TCU | | – | | 4 | – | 5 | – | 0 |
| Southwestern Presbyterian | | – | | 3 | – | 4 | – | 0 |
| Wake Forest | | – | | 3 | – | 4 | – | 0 |
| Navy | | – | | 3 | – | 5 | – | 1 |
| Western Kentucky State Normal | | – | | 1 | – | 4 | – | 2 |
| Louisville | | – | | 1 | – | 5 | – | 1 |
| Marshall | | – | | 1 | – | 7 | – | 0 |
| Cumberland (TN) | | – | | 0 | – | 6 | – | 1 |

The 1915 Middle Tennessee State Normal football team represented the Middle Tennessee State Normal School (now known as Middle Tennessee State University) during the 1915 college football season. The head coach was Alfred B. Miles serving his third season with the team.

== Schedule ==
| Date | Opponent | Site | Result | Source |
|---|---|---|---|---|
| September 25 | at Vanderbilt | Dudley Field; Nashville, TN | L 0–51 | |
| October 2 | Cumberland (TN) | Murfreesboro, TN | T 0–0 | |
| October 9 | at Castle Heights Military Institute | | W 20–0 | |
| October 16 | Chatt. Central | Murfreesboro, TN | L 0–20 | |
| October 30 | Vanderbilt B team | Murfreesboro, TN | L 0–14 | |
| November 12 | at Western Kentucky State Normal | Bowling Green, KY (rivalry) | W 47–0 | |
| November 19 | Southwestern Presbyterian | Murfreesboro, TN | W 14–7 | |
