= 1915 West Virginia Mountaineers football team =

American college football season

1915 West Virginia Mountaineers football
- Conference: Independent
- Record: 5–1–1
- Head coach: Sol Metzger (2nd season)
- Captain: Carl P. Leatherwood

1915 Southern college football independents records
	Conf.			Overall
Team	W	L	T	W		L		T
Georgia Tech		–		7	–	0	–	1
Ouachita Baptist		–		7	–	1	–	0
Dallas		–		6	–	1	–	0
Spring Hill		–		6	–	1	–	0
North Texas State Normal		–		5	–	1	–	1
Sam Houston Normal		–		5	–	1	–	1
West Virginia		–		5	–	1	–	1
Jonesboro Aggies		–		4	–	1	–	1
Johns Hopkins		–		6	–	2	–	0
VMI		–		6	–	2	–	1
Southwestern Louisiana Industrial		–		5	–	2	–	1
Delaware		–		6	–	3	–	0
Maryland		–		6	–	3	–	0
Louisiana Normal College		–		4	–	2	–	0
Southwest Texas State		–		5	–	3	–	2
Davidson		–		4	–	3	–	1
Mississippi Normal		–		4	–	3	–	0
West Tennessee State Normal		–		4	–	3	–	0
Guilford		–		1	–	1	–	0
Middle Tennessee State Normal		–		3	–	3	–	1
Birmingham		–		2	–	2	–	1
Presbyterian		–		4	–	4	–	0
Henderson-Brown		–		3	–	4	–	1
TCU		–		4	–	5	–	0
Southwestern Presbyterian		–		3	–	4	–	0
Wake Forest		–		3	–	4	–	0
Navy		–		3	–	5	–	1
Western Kentucky State Normal		–		1	–	4	–	2
Louisville		–		1	–	5	–	1
Marshall		–		1	–	7	–	0
Cumberland (TN)		–		0	–	6	–	1

The 1915 West Virginia Mountaineers football team was an American football team that represented West Virginia University as an independent during the 1915 college football season. In its second and final season under head coach Sol Metzger, the team compiled a 5–1–1 record and outscored opponents by a total of 208 to 19.

== Schedule ==
Date	Opponent	Site	Result	Source
September 25	at Penn	Franklin Field; Philadelphia, PA	L 0–7	
October 2	Washington & Jefferson	Athletic Field; Morgantown, WV	T 6–6	
October 16	Geneva	Athletic Field; Morgantown, WV	W 32–0	
November 6	at Marshall	League Park; Huntington, WV (rivalry)	W 92–6	
November 13	VPI	Athletic Field; Morgantown, WV (rivalry)	W 19–0	
November 19	vs. Marietta	Parkersburg, WV	W 28–0	
November 25	vs. West Virginia Wesleyan	South Side Park; Fairmont, WV	W 30–0	
