= 1915 Navy Midshipmen football team =

American college football season

1915 Navy Midshipmen football
- Conference: Independent
- Record: 3–5–1
- Head coach: Jonas Ingram (1st season)
- Captain: Arthur Miles
- Home stadium: Worden Field

1915 Southern college football independents records
	Conf.			Overall
Team	W	L	T	W		L		T
Georgia Tech		–		7	–	0	–	1
Ouachita Baptist		–		7	–	1	–	0
Dallas		–		6	–	1	–	0
Spring Hill		–		6	–	1	–	0
North Texas State Normal		–		5	–	1	–	1
Sam Houston Normal		–		5	–	1	–	1
West Virginia		–		5	–	1	–	1
Jonesboro Aggies		–		4	–	1	–	1
Johns Hopkins		–		6	–	2	–	0
VMI		–		6	–	2	–	1
Southwestern Louisiana Industrial		–		5	–	2	–	1
Delaware		–		6	–	3	–	0
Maryland		–		6	–	3	–	0
Louisiana Normal College		–		4	–	2	–	0
Southwest Texas State		–		5	–	3	–	2
Davidson		–		4	–	3	–	1
Mississippi Normal		–		4	–	3	–	0
West Tennessee State Normal		–		4	–	3	–	0
Guilford		–		1	–	1	–	0
Middle Tennessee State Normal		–		3	–	3	–	1
Birmingham		–		2	–	2	–	1
Presbyterian		–		4	–	4	–	0
Henderson-Brown		–		3	–	4	–	1
TCU		–		4	–	5	–	0
Southwestern Presbyterian		–		3	–	4	–	0
Wake Forest		–		3	–	4	–	0
Navy		–		3	–	5	–	1
Western Kentucky State Normal		–		1	–	4	–	2
Louisville		–		1	–	5	–	1
Marshall		–		1	–	7	–	0
Cumberland (TN)		–		0	–	6	–	1

The 1915 Navy Midshipmen football team represented the United States Naval Academy during the 1915 college football season. In its first season under head coach Jonas Ingram, the team compiled a 3–5–1 record and was outscored by a combined score of 118 to 99.

The annual Army–Navy Game was played on November 27 at the Polo Grounds in New York City; Army won 14–0.

== Schedule ==
Date	Opponent	Site	Result	Source
October 2	Georgetown	Worden Field; Annapolis, MD	L 0–9	
October 9	Pittsburgh	Worden Field; Annapolis, MD	L 12–47	
October 16	at Penn	Franklin Field; Philadelphia, PA	T 7–7	
October 23	VPI	Worden Field; Annapolis, MD	W 20–0	
October 30	North Carolina A&M	Worden Field; Annapolis, MD	L 12–14	
November 6	Bucknell	Worden Field; Annapolis, MD	W 13–3	
November 13	Colby	Worden Field; Annapolis, MD	W 28–14	
November 20	Ursinus	Worden Field; Annapolis, MD	L 7–10	
November 27	vs. Army	Polo Grounds; New York, NY (Army–Navy Game)	L 0–14	
