= 1915 Presbyterian Blue Hose football team =

American college football season

1915 Presbyterian Blue Hose football
- Conference: Independent
- Record: 4–4
- Head coach: Walter A. Johnson (1st season)
- Captain: J. W. C. Bell

1915 Southern college football independents records
| | Conf. | | | Overall |
| Team | W | L | T | W | | L | | T |
|---|---|---|---|---|---|---|---|---|
| Georgia Tech | | – | | 7 | – | 0 | – | 1 |
| Ouachita Baptist | | – | | 7 | – | 1 | – | 0 |
| Dallas | | – | | 6 | – | 1 | – | 0 |
| Spring Hill | | – | | 6 | – | 1 | – | 0 |
| North Texas State Normal | | – | | 5 | – | 1 | – | 1 |
| Sam Houston Normal | | – | | 5 | – | 1 | – | 1 |
| West Virginia | | – | | 5 | – | 1 | – | 1 |
| Jonesboro Aggies | | – | | 4 | – | 1 | – | 1 |
| Johns Hopkins | | – | | 6 | – | 2 | – | 0 |
| VMI | | – | | 6 | – | 2 | – | 1 |
| Southwestern Louisiana Industrial | | – | | 5 | – | 2 | – | 1 |
| Delaware | | – | | 6 | – | 3 | – | 0 |
| Maryland | | – | | 6 | – | 3 | – | 0 |
| Louisiana Normal College | | – | | 4 | – | 2 | – | 0 |
| Southwest Texas State | | – | | 5 | – | 3 | – | 2 |
| Davidson | | – | | 4 | – | 3 | – | 1 |
| Mississippi Normal | | – | | 4 | – | 3 | – | 0 |
| West Tennessee State Normal | | – | | 4 | – | 3 | – | 0 |
| Guilford | | – | | 1 | – | 1 | – | 0 |
| Middle Tennessee State Normal | | – | | 3 | – | 3 | – | 1 |
| Birmingham | | – | | 2 | – | 2 | – | 1 |
| Presbyterian | | – | | 4 | – | 4 | – | 0 |
| Henderson-Brown | | – | | 3 | – | 4 | – | 1 |
| TCU | | – | | 4 | – | 5 | – | 0 |
| Wake Forest | | – | | 3 | – | 4 | – | 0 |
| Navy | | – | | 3 | – | 5 | – | 1 |
| Western Kentucky State Normal | | – | | 1 | – | 4 | – | 2 |
| Louisville | | – | | 1 | – | 5 | – | 1 |
| Marshall | | – | | 1 | – | 7 | – | 0 |
| Cumberland (TN) | | – | | 0 | – | 6 | – | 1 |

The 1915 Presbyterian Blue Hose football team represented Presbyterian College as an independent during the 1915 college football season. Led by the first-year head coach Walter A. Johnson, Presbyterian compiled a record of 4–4. The team captain was J. W. C. Bell.

== Schedule ==
| Date | Time | Opponent | Site | Result | Source |
|---|---|---|---|---|---|
| October 2 | | at Wofford | Spartanburg, SC | W 17–6 | |
| October 9 | | at South Carolina | Davis Field; Columbia, SC | L 0–41 | |
| October 15 | 4:00 p.m. | at Furman | Greenville, SC | W 20–12 | |
| October 27 | | vs. The Citadel | State Fairgrounds; Columbia, SC | L 0–14 | |
| October 30 | | at Clemson Freshman | Riggs Field; Calhoun, SC | W 13–7 | |
| November 3 | 3:30 p.m. | at Furman | Augusta Street Park; Greenville, SC | L 7–38 | |
| November 5 | | Erskine | Clinton, SC | W 60–0 | |
| November 25 | | Newberry | Clinton, SC | L 13–20 | |
