= 1915 VMI Keydets football team =

American college football season

1915 VMI Keydets football
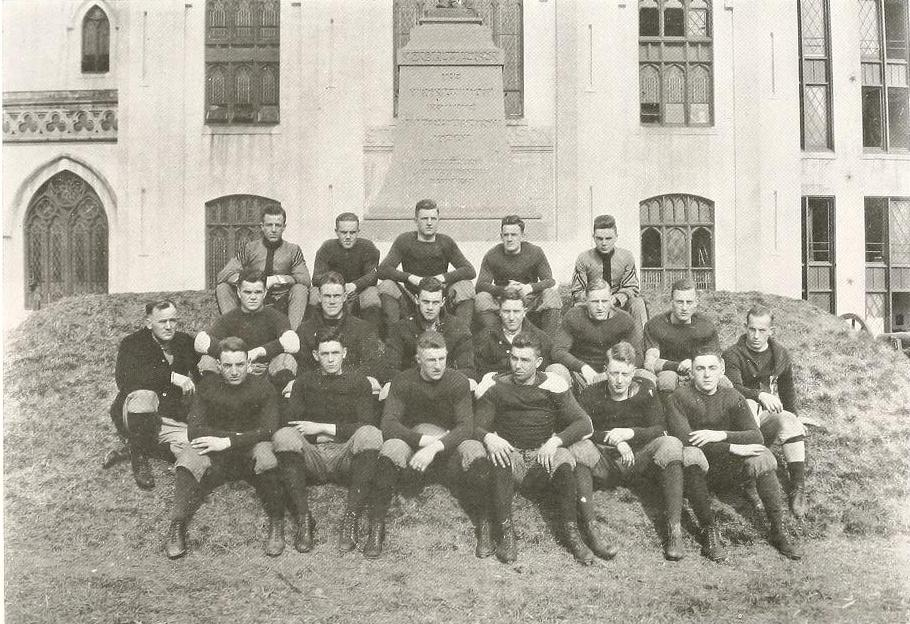
- Conference: Independent
- Record: 6–2–1
- Head coach: Frank Gorton (2nd season)
- Home stadium: VMI Parade Ground

1915 Southern college football independents records
	Conf.			Overall
Team	W	L	T	W		L		T
Georgia Tech		–		7	–	0	–	1
Ouachita Baptist		–		7	–	1	–	0
Dallas		–		6	–	1	–	0
Spring Hill		–		6	–	1	–	0
North Texas State Normal		–		5	–	1	–	1
Sam Houston Normal		–		5	–	1	–	1
West Virginia		–		5	–	1	–	1
Jonesboro Aggies		–		4	–	1	–	1
Johns Hopkins		–		6	–	2	–	0
VMI		–		6	–	2	–	1
Southwestern Louisiana Industrial		–		5	–	2	–	1
Delaware		–		6	–	3	–	0
Maryland		–		6	–	3	–	0
Louisiana Normal College		–		4	–	2	–	0
Southwest Texas State		–		5	–	3	–	2
Davidson		–		4	–	3	–	1
Mississippi Normal		–		4	–	3	–	0
West Tennessee State Normal		–		4	–	3	–	0
Guilford		–		1	–	1	–	0
Middle Tennessee State Normal		–		3	–	3	–	1
Birmingham		–		2	–	2	–	1
Presbyterian		–		4	–	4	–	0
Henderson-Brown		–		3	–	4	–	1
TCU		–		4	–	5	–	0
Wake Forest		–		3	–	4	–	0
Navy		–		3	–	5	–	1
Western Kentucky State Normal		–		1	–	4	–	2
Louisville		–		1	–	5	–	1
Marshall		–		1	–	7	–	0

The 1915 VMI Keydets football team represented the Virginia Military Institute (VMI) in their 25th season of organized football. Frank Gorton lead the Keydets to another successful year with a 6–2–1 record.

== Schedule ==
Date	Time	Opponent	Site	Result	Source
September 25		Hampden–Sydney	VMI Parade Ground; Lexington, VA	W 25–7	
October 2		William & Mary	VMI Parade Ground; Lexington, VA (rivalry)	W 19–6	
October 9		Gallaudet	VMI Parade Ground; Lexington, VA	W 7–0	
October 16		Richmond	VMI Parade Ground; Lexington, VA	W 13–6	
October 23		vs. North Carolina	Cone Athletic Park (II); Greensboro, NC	T 3–3	
October 30		at Virginia	Lambeth Field; Charlottesville, VA	L 0–44	
November 6		Wake Forest	VMI Parade Ground; Lexington, VA	W 21–6	
November 13	3:00 p.m.	vs. Clemson	Broad Street Park; Richmond, VA	W 6–3	
November 25	2:30 p.m.	vs. VPI	Fair Grounds; Roanoke, VA (rivalry)	L 9–27]	
