= 1915 Maryland Aggies football team =

American college football season

1915 Maryland Aggies football
- Conference: Independent
- Record: 6–3
- Head coach: Curley Byrd (5th season)

1915 Southern college football independents records
	Conf.			Overall
Team	W	L	T	W		L		T
Georgia Tech		–		7	–	0	–	1
Ouachita Baptist		–		7	–	1	–	0
Dallas		–		6	–	1	–	0
Spring Hill		–		6	–	1	–	0
North Texas State Normal		–		5	–	1	–	1
Sam Houston Normal		–		5	–	1	–	1
West Virginia		–		5	–	1	–	1
Jonesboro Aggies		–		4	–	1	–	1
Johns Hopkins		–		6	–	2	–	0
VMI		–		6	–	2	–	1
Southwestern Louisiana Industrial		–		5	–	2	–	1
Delaware		–		6	–	3	–	0
Maryland		–		6	–	3	–	0
Louisiana Normal College		–		4	–	2	–	0
Southwest Texas State		–		5	–	3	–	2
Davidson		–		4	–	3	–	1
Mississippi Normal		–		4	–	3	–	0
West Tennessee State Normal		–		4	–	3	–	0
Guilford		–		1	–	1	–	0
Middle Tennessee State Normal		–		3	–	3	–	1
Birmingham		–		2	–	2	–	1
Presbyterian		–		4	–	4	–	0
Henderson-Brown		–		3	–	4	–	1
TCU		–		4	–	5	–	0
Wake Forest		–		3	–	4	–	0
Navy		–		3	–	5	–	1
Western Kentucky State Normal		–		1	–	4	–	2
Louisville		–		1	–	5	–	1
Marshall		–		1	–	7	–	0

The 1915 Maryland Aggies football team represented Maryland Agricultural College (which became Maryland State College in 1916 and part of the University of Maryland in 1920) in the 1915 college football season. In their fifth season under head coach Curley Byrd, the Aggies compiled a 6–3 record, and outscored all opponents, 161 to 69. The team's three losses were to Haverford College (0–7), Catholic University (0–16), and Johns Hopkins (0–3).

== Schedule ==
Date	Opponent	Site	Result	Source
September 25	Baltimore Polytechnic Institute	College Park, MD	W 31–0	
October 2	at Haverford	Walton Field; Haverford, PA	L 0–7	
October 9	at Catholic University	Washington, DC	L 0–16	
October 16	Gallaudet	College Park, MD	W 10–3	
October 23	Pennsylvania Military	College Park, MD	W 14–13	
October 30	St. John's (MD)	College Park, MD	W 27–14	
November 6	Washington College	College Park, MD	W 28–13	
November 13	Western Maryland	College Park, MD	W 51–0	
November 25	at Johns Hopkins	Homewood Field; Baltimore, MD	L 0–3	
