= 1915 Delaware Fightin' Blue Hens football team =

American college football season

1915 Delaware Fightin' Blue Hens football
- Conference: Independent
- Record: 6–3
- Head coach: William McAvoy (8th season)
- Captain: Victor H. Handy
- Home stadium: Frazer Field

1915 Southern college football independents records
	Conf.			Overall
Team	W	L	T	W		L		T
Georgia Tech		–		7	–	0	–	1
Ouachita Baptist		–		7	–	1	–	0
Dallas		–		6	–	1	–	0
Spring Hill		–		6	–	1	–	0
North Texas State Normal		–		5	–	1	–	1
Sam Houston Normal		–		5	–	1	–	1
West Virginia		–		5	–	1	–	1
Jonesboro Aggies		–		4	–	1	–	1
Johns Hopkins		–		6	–	2	–	0
VMI		–		6	–	2	–	1
Southwestern Louisiana Industrial		–		5	–	2	–	1
Delaware		–		6	–	3	–	0
Maryland		–		6	–	3	–	0
Louisiana Normal College		–		4	–	2	–	0
Southwest Texas State		–		5	–	3	–	2
Davidson		–		4	–	3	–	1
Mississippi Normal		–		4	–	3	–	0
West Tennessee State Normal		–		4	–	3	–	0
Guilford		–		1	–	1	–	0
Middle Tennessee State Normal		–		3	–	3	–	1
Birmingham		–		2	–	2	–	1
Presbyterian		–		4	–	4	–	0
Henderson-Brown		–		3	–	4	–	1
TCU		–		4	–	5	–	0
Wake Forest		–		3	–	4	–	0
Navy		–		3	–	5	–	1
Western Kentucky State Normal		–		1	–	4	–	2
Louisville		–		1	–	5	–	1
Marshall		–		1	–	7	–	0

The 1915 Delaware Fightin' Blue Hens football team was an American football team that represented Delaware College (later renamed the University of Delaware) as an independent during the 1915 college football season. In its eighth season under head coach William McAvoy, the team compiled a 6–3 record and outscored opponents by a total of 183 to 139. Victor H. Handy was the team captain. The team played its home games at Frazer Field in Newark, Delaware.

== Schedule ==
Date	Opponent	Site	Result	Attendance	Source
October 2	at Pennsylvania Military	Chester, PA	W 7–6		
October 9	at Haverford	Haverford, PA	L 14–37		
October 16	Pennsylvania Military	Frazer Field; Newark, DE	W 13–6		
October 20	at Lafayette	March Field; Easton, PA	L 0–31		
October 23	Western Maryland	Frazer Field; Newark, DE	W 19–6		
October 30	at Catholic University	Washington, DC	L 0–40		
November 6	Dickinson	Frazer Field; Newark, DE	W 24–7		
November 13	at Mount St. Mary's	Emmitsburg, MD	W 13–6		
November 25	William & Mary	Frazer Field; Newark, DE (rivalry)	W 93–0		
