= 1915 Southwestern Louisiana Industrial football team =

American college football season

1915 Southwestern Louisiana Industrial football
- Conference: Independent
- Record: 5–2–1
- Head coach: Richard B. Dunbar (2nd season)
- Home stadium: Campus Athletic Field

1915 Southern college football independents records
	Conf.			Overall
Team	W	L	T	W		L		T
Georgia Tech		–		7	–	0	–	1
Ouachita Baptist		–		7	–	1	–	0
Dallas		–		6	–	1	–	0
Spring Hill		–		6	–	1	–	0
North Texas State Normal		–		5	–	1	–	1
Sam Houston Normal		–		5	–	1	–	1
West Virginia		–		5	–	1	–	1
Jonesboro Aggies		–		4	–	1	–	1
Johns Hopkins		–		6	–	2	–	0
VMI		–		6	–	2	–	1
Southwestern Louisiana Industrial		–		5	–	2	–	1
Delaware		–		6	–	3	–	0
Maryland		–		6	–	3	–	0
Louisiana Normal College		–		4	–	2	–	0
Southwest Texas State		–		5	–	3	–	2
Davidson		–		4	–	3	–	1
Mississippi Normal		–		4	–	3	–	0
West Tennessee State Normal		–		4	–	3	–	0
Guilford		–		1	–	1	–	0
Middle Tennessee State Normal		–		3	–	3	–	1
Birmingham		–		2	–	2	–	1
Presbyterian		–		4	–	4	–	0
Henderson-Brown		–		3	–	4	–	1
TCU		–		4	–	5	–	0
Wake Forest		–		3	–	4	–	0
Navy		–		3	–	5	–	1
Western Kentucky State Normal		–		1	–	4	–	2
Louisville		–		1	–	5	–	1
Marshall		–		1	–	7	–	0

The 1915 Southwestern Louisiana Industrial football team was an American football team that represented the Southwestern Louisiana Industrial Institute (now known as the University of Louisiana at Lafayette) as an independent during the 1915 college football season. In their second year under head coach Richard B. Dunbar, the team compiled a 5–2–1 record.

== Schedule ==
Date	Opponent	Site	Result	Source
October 2	at St. Charles College (LA)		W 12–0	
October 9	at Tulane	Tulane Stadium; New Orleans, LA	L 0–13	
October 16	LSU JV	Lafayette, LA	W 7–0	
October 23	Chamberlain-Hunt	Lafayette, LA	W 25–0	
October 30	at St. Charles College (LA)	Grand Coteau, LA	W 20–6	
November 6	at Louisiana College	Pineville, LA	W 47–0	
November 13	at Louisiana Industrial	Ruston, LA	T 7–7	
November 25	at Louisiana Normal	Normal Athletic Park; Natchitoches, LA	L 0–14	
