= 1915 Louisville Cardinals football team =

American college football season

1915 Louisville Cardinals football
- Conference: Independent
- Record: 1–5–1
- Head coach: Will Duffy (1st season)
- Home stadium: Eclipse Park

1915 Southern college football independents records
	Conf.			Overall
Team	W	L	T	W		L		T
Georgia Tech		–		7	–	0	–	1
Ouachita Baptist		–		7	–	1	–	0
Dallas		–		6	–	1	–	0
Spring Hill		–		6	–	1	–	0
North Texas State Normal		–		5	–	1	–	1
Sam Houston Normal		–		5	–	1	–	1
West Virginia		–		5	–	1	–	1
Jonesboro Aggies		–		4	–	1	–	1
Johns Hopkins		–		6	–	2	–	0
VMI		–		6	–	2	–	1
Southwestern Louisiana Industrial		–		5	–	2	–	1
Delaware		–		6	–	3	–	0
Maryland		–		6	–	3	–	0
Louisiana Normal College		–		4	–	2	–	0
Southwest Texas State		–		5	–	3	–	2
Davidson		–		4	–	3	–	1
Mississippi Normal		–		4	–	3	–	0
West Tennessee State Normal		–		4	–	3	–	0
Guilford		–		1	–	1	–	0
Middle Tennessee State Normal		–		3	–	3	–	1
Birmingham		–		2	–	2	–	1
Presbyterian		–		4	–	4	–	0
Henderson-Brown		–		3	–	4	–	1
TCU		–		4	–	5	–	0
Wake Forest		–		3	–	4	–	0
Navy		–		3	–	5	–	1
Western Kentucky State Normal		–		1	–	4	–	2
Louisville		–		1	–	5	–	1
Marshall		–		1	–	7	–	0

The 1915 Louisville Cardinals football team was an American football team that represented the University of Louisville as an independent during the 1915 college football season. In their first season under head coach Will Duffy, the Cardinals compiled a 1–5–1 record. The team played its home games at Eclipse Park in Louisville, Kentucky.

== Schedule ==
Date	Opponent	Site	Result	Attendance	Source
October 2	Central University	Eclipse Park; Louisville, KY	T 0–0		
October 9	at Wabash	Crawfordsville, IN	L 0–38		
October 16	Chattanooga	Eclipse Park; Louisville, KY	L 6–21		
October 30	Rose Poly	Eclipse Park; Louisville, KY	W 22–6		
November 6	Kentucky	Eclipse Park; Louisville, KY (rivalry)	L 0–15	4,000	
November 13	Franklin (IN)	Eclipse Park; Louisville, KY	L 7–13		
November 25	Transylvania	Eclipse Park; Louisville, KY	L 0–26		
