= 1915 Sam Houston Normal football team =

American college football season

1915 Sam Houston Normal football
- Conference: Independent
- Record: 5–1–1
- Head coach: Gene Berry (2nd season)

1915 Southern college football independents records
	Conf.			Overall
Team	W	L	T	W		L		T
Georgia Tech		–		7	–	0	–	1
Ouachita Baptist		–		7	–	1	–	0
Dallas		–		6	–	1	–	0
Spring Hill		–		6	–	1	–	0
North Texas State Normal		–		5	–	1	–	1
Sam Houston Normal		–		5	–	1	–	1
West Virginia		–		5	–	1	–	1
Jonesboro Aggies		–		4	–	1	–	1
Johns Hopkins		–		6	–	2	–	0
VMI		–		6	–	2	–	1
Southwestern Louisiana Industrial		–		5	–	2	–	1
Delaware		–		6	–	3	–	0
Maryland		–		6	–	3	–	0
Louisiana Normal College		–		4	–	2	–	0
Southwest Texas State		–		5	–	3	–	2
Davidson		–		4	–	3	–	1
Mississippi Normal		–		4	–	3	–	0
West Tennessee State Normal		–		4	–	3	–	0
Guilford		–		1	–	1	–	0
Middle Tennessee State Normal		–		3	–	3	–	1
Birmingham		–		2	–	2	–	1
Presbyterian		–		4	–	4	–	0
Henderson-Brown		–		3	–	4	–	1
TCU		–		4	–	5	–	0
Wake Forest		–		3	–	4	–	0
Navy		–		3	–	5	–	1
Western Kentucky State Normal		–		1	–	4	–	2
Louisville		–		1	–	5	–	1
Marshall		–		1	–	7	–	0

The 1915 Sam Houston Normal football team represented Sam Houston Normal Institute—now known as Sam Houston State University—as an independent during the 1915 college football season. Led by second-year head coach Gene Berry, Sam Houston Normal compiled a record of 5–1–1.

== Schedule ==
Date	Opponent	Site	Result	Source
	Cleveland High School	Huntsville, TX	W 58–0	
October 16	Palestine YMCA	Huntsville, TX	W 68–0	
October 23	Allen Academy	Huntsville, TX	W 40–0	
October 30	Houston High School	Huntsville, TX	W 66–0	
November 8	at Alexander Institute	Jacksonville, TX	W 19–3	
November 15	at Southwest Texas State	Southwestern Texas Normal athletic field; San Marcos, TX (rivalry)	T 0–0	
November 25	North Texas State Normal	Huntsville, TX	L 0–6	
