= 1915 Western Kentucky State Normal football team =

American college football season

1915 Western Kentucky State Normal football
- Conference: Independent
- Record: 1–4–2
- Head coach: J. L. Arthur (2nd season)
- Captain: Gibson

1915 Southern college football independents records
	Conf.			Overall
Team	W	L	T	W		L		T
Georgia Tech		–		7	–	0	–	1
Ouachita Baptist		–		7	–	1	–	0
Dallas		–		6	–	1	–	0
Spring Hill		–		6	–	1	–	0
North Texas State Normal		–		5	–	1	–	1
Sam Houston Normal		–		5	–	1	–	1
West Virginia		–		5	–	1	–	1
Jonesboro Aggies		–		4	–	1	–	1
Johns Hopkins		–		6	–	2	–	0
VMI		–		6	–	2	–	1
Southwestern Louisiana Industrial		–		5	–	2	–	1
Delaware		–		6	–	3	–	0
Maryland		–		6	–	3	–	0
Louisiana Normal College		–		4	–	2	–	0
Southwest Texas State		–		5	–	3	–	2
Davidson		–		4	–	3	–	1
Mississippi Normal		–		4	–	3	–	0
West Tennessee State Normal		–		4	–	3	–	0
Guilford		–		1	–	1	–	0
Middle Tennessee State Normal		–		3	–	3	–	1
Birmingham		–		2	–	2	–	1
Presbyterian		–		4	–	4	–	0
Henderson-Brown		–		3	–	4	–	1
TCU		–		4	–	5	–	0
Wake Forest		–		3	–	4	–	0
Navy		–		3	–	5	–	1
Western Kentucky State Normal		–		1	–	4	–	2
Louisville		–		1	–	5	–	1
Marshall		–		1	–	7	–	0

The 1915 Western Kentucky State Normal football team represented Western Kentucky State Normal School (now known as Western Kentucky University) as an independent during the 1915 college football season. They were led by head coach J. L. Arthur.

== Schedule ==
Date	Opponent	Site	Result
October 2	Hopkinsville High School	Bowling Green, KY	W 6–0
October 9	Bethel (KY)	Bowling Green, KY	T 14–14
October 15	at Owensboro High School	Owensboro, KY	L 0–51
October 23	at Bethel (KY)	Russellville, KY	L 0–40
November 1	Eastern Kentucky State Normal	Bowling Green, KY (rivalry)	T 0–0
November 13	Middle Tennessee State Normal	Bowling Green, KY (rivalry)	L 0–47
November 15	at Eastern Kentucky State Normal	Richmond, KY (rivalry)	L 0–6
