= 1915 North Texas State Normal football team =

American college football season

1915 North Texas State Normal football
- Conference: Independent
- Record: 5–1–1
- Head coach: James W. St. Clair (1st season)
- Home stadium: Eagle Field

1915 Southern college football independents records
	Conf.			Overall
Team	W	L	T	W		L		T
Georgia Tech		–		7	–	0	–	1
Ouachita Baptist		–		7	–	1	–	0
Dallas		–		6	–	1	–	0
Spring Hill		–		6	–	1	–	0
North Texas State Normal		–		5	–	1	–	1
Sam Houston Normal		–		5	–	1	–	1
West Virginia		–		5	–	1	–	1
Jonesboro Aggies		–		4	–	1	–	1
Johns Hopkins		–		6	–	2	–	0
VMI		–		6	–	2	–	1
Southwestern Louisiana Industrial		–		5	–	2	–	1
Delaware		–		6	–	3	–	0
Maryland		–		6	–	3	–	0
Louisiana Normal College		–		4	–	2	–	0
Southwest Texas State		–		5	–	3	–	2
Davidson		–		4	–	3	–	1
Mississippi Normal		–		4	–	3	–	0
West Tennessee State Normal		–		4	–	3	–	0
Guilford		–		1	–	1	–	0
Middle Tennessee State Normal		–		3	–	3	–	1
Birmingham		–		2	–	2	–	1
Presbyterian		–		4	–	4	–	0
Henderson-Brown		–		3	–	4	–	1
TCU		–		4	–	5	–	0
Wake Forest		–		3	–	4	–	0
Navy		–		3	–	5	–	1
Western Kentucky State Normal		–		1	–	4	–	2
Louisville		–		1	–	5	–	1
Marshall		–		1	–	7	–	0

The 1915 North Texas State Normal football team represented North Texas State Normal College (now known as the University of North Texas) as an independent during the 1915 college football season. Led by first-year head coach James W. St. Clair, the squad compiled an overall record of 5–1–1.

== Schedule ==
Date	Opponent	Site	Result	Source
October 4	at Southeastern Oklahoma Normal	Normal Field; Durant, OK	W 12–0	
October 13	at Austin	Cashion Field; Sherman, TX	T 0–0	
October 22	Decatur Baptist	Eagle Field; Denton, TX	W 75–0	
November 1	Southwest Texas State	Eagle Field; Denton, TX	W 14–0	
November 5	at Decatur Baptist	Decatur, TX	W 53–0	
November 20	at Dallas	Dallas, TX	L 0–6	
November 25	at Sam Houston Normal	Pritchett Field; Huntsville, TX	W 6–0	
