= 1915 Southwest Texas State football team =

American college football season

1915 Southwest Texas State football
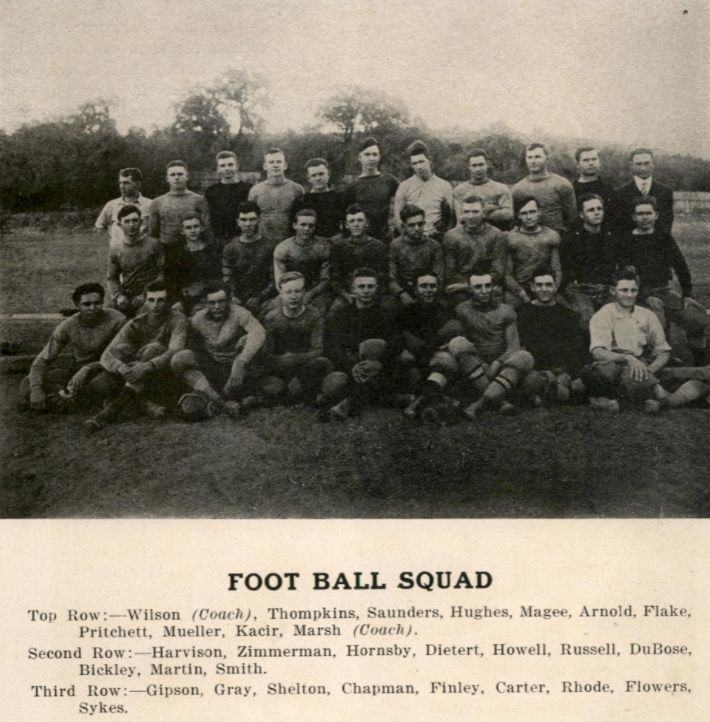
- Conference: Independent
- Record: 5–3–2
- Head coach: C. Spurgeon Smith (3rd season)
- Captain: R. O. Dietert
- Home stadium: Southwestern Texas Normal athletic field

1915 Southern college football independents records
	Conf.			Overall
Team	W	L	T	W		L		T
Georgia Tech		–		7	–	0	–	1
Ouachita Baptist		–		7	–	1	–	0
Dallas		–		6	–	1	–	0
Spring Hill		–		6	–	1	–	0
North Texas State Normal		–		5	–	1	–	1
Sam Houston Normal		–		5	–	1	–	1
West Virginia		–		5	–	1	–	1
Jonesboro Aggies		–		4	–	1	–	1
Johns Hopkins		–		6	–	2	–	0
VMI		–		6	–	2	–	1
Southwestern Louisiana Industrial		–		5	–	2	–	1
Delaware		–		6	–	3	–	0
Maryland		–		6	–	3	–	0
Louisiana Normal College		–		4	–	2	–	0
Southwest Texas State		–		5	–	3	–	2
Davidson		–		4	–	3	–	1
Mississippi Normal		–		4	–	3	–	0
West Tennessee State Normal		–		4	–	3	–	0
Guilford		–		1	–	1	–	0
Middle Tennessee State Normal		–		3	–	3	–	1
Birmingham		–		2	–	2	–	1
Presbyterian		–		4	–	4	–	0
Henderson-Brown		–		3	–	4	–	1
TCU		–		4	–	5	–	0
Wake Forest		–		3	–	4	–	0
Navy		–		3	–	5	–	1
Western Kentucky State Normal		–		1	–	4	–	2
Louisville		–		1	–	5	–	1
Marshall		–		1	–	7	–	0

The 1915 Southwest Texas State football team was an American football team that represented Southwest Texas State Normal School—now known as Texas State University–as an independent during the 1915 college football season. Led by C. Spurgeon Smith in his third and final season as head coach, the team finished the season with a record of 5–3–2. The team's captain was R. O. Dietert, who played end and quarterback.

== Schedule ==
Date	Opponent	Site	Result	Source
October 4	Coronal Institute		T 0–0	
October 12	Texas Lutheran	Southwestern Texas Normal athletic field; San Marcos, TX	W 41–0	
October 18	vs. San Marcos Baptist Academy	Coronal field; San Marcos, TX	L 6–10	
October 23	Texas Lutheran		W 13–6	
November 1	at North Texas State Normal	Denton, TX	L 0–14	
November 5	Southwestern University Preps		W 34–0	
November 15	Sam Houston Normal	Southwestern Texas Normal athletic field; San Marcos, TX (rivalry)	T 0–0	
November 24	Southwestern (TX) JV		W 39–0	
November 29	San Antonio High School		W 23–7	
December 8	vs. Coronal Institute	Baptist Academy Field; San Marcos, TX	L 0–6	
