= 1915 Mississippi Normal Normalites football team =

American college football season

1915 Mississippi Normal Normalites football
- Conference: Independent
- Record: 4–3
- Head coach: A. B. Dille (2nd season)
- Home stadium: Kamper Park

1915 Southern college football independents records
| | Conf. | | | Overall |
| Team | W | L | T | W | | L | | T |
|---|---|---|---|---|---|---|---|---|
| Georgia Tech | | – | | 7 | – | 0 | – | 1 |
| Ouachita Baptist | | – | | 7 | – | 1 | – | 0 |
| Dallas | | – | | 6 | – | 1 | – | 0 |
| Spring Hill | | – | | 6 | – | 1 | – | 0 |
| North Texas State Normal | | – | | 5 | – | 1 | – | 1 |
| Sam Houston Normal | | – | | 5 | – | 1 | – | 1 |
| West Virginia | | – | | 5 | – | 1 | – | 1 |
| Jonesboro Aggies | | – | | 4 | – | 1 | – | 1 |
| Johns Hopkins | | – | | 6 | – | 2 | – | 0 |
| VMI | | – | | 6 | – | 2 | – | 1 |
| Southwestern Louisiana Industrial | | – | | 5 | – | 2 | – | 1 |
| Delaware | | – | | 6 | – | 3 | – | 0 |
| Maryland | | – | | 6 | – | 3 | – | 0 |
| Louisiana Normal College | | – | | 4 | – | 2 | – | 0 |
| Southwest Texas State | | – | | 5 | – | 3 | – | 2 |
| Davidson | | – | | 4 | – | 3 | – | 1 |
| Mississippi Normal | | – | | 4 | – | 3 | – | 0 |
| West Tennessee State Normal | | – | | 4 | – | 3 | – | 0 |
| Guilford | | – | | 1 | – | 1 | – | 0 |
| Middle Tennessee State Normal | | – | | 3 | – | 3 | – | 1 |
| Birmingham | | – | | 2 | – | 2 | – | 1 |
| Presbyterian | | – | | 4 | – | 4 | – | 0 |
| Henderson-Brown | | – | | 3 | – | 4 | – | 1 |
| TCU | | – | | 4 | – | 5 | – | 0 |
| Wake Forest | | – | | 3 | – | 4 | – | 0 |
| Navy | | – | | 3 | – | 5 | – | 1 |
| Western Kentucky State Normal | | – | | 1 | – | 4 | – | 2 |
| Louisville | | – | | 1 | – | 5 | – | 1 |
| Marshall | | – | | 1 | – | 7 | – | 0 |

The 1915 Mississippi Normal Normalites football team was an American football team that represented Mississippi Normal College (now known as the University of Southern Mississippi) as an independent during the 1915 college football season. In their second year under head coach A. B. Dille, the team compiled a 4–3 record.

== Schedule ==
| Date | Opponent | Site | Result | Source |
|---|---|---|---|---|
| October 9 | Poplarville High School | Kamper Park; Hattiesburg, MS | L 0–6 | |
| October 16 | at Gulf Coast Military Academy | Gulfport, MS | L 0–3 | |
| October 30 | Perkinston High School | Kamper Park; Hattiesburg, MS | W 26–0 | |
| November 6 | at Spring Hill | Monroe Field; Mobile, AL | L 7–33 | |
| November 13 | Copiah-Lincoln High School | Kamper Park; Hattiesburg, MS | W 55–0 | |
| November 20 | Poplarville High School | Kamper Park; Hattiesburg, MS | W 12–0 | |
| November 25 | Gulf Coast Military Academy | Kamper Park; Hattiesburg, MS | W 7–6 | |
