= 1915 Wake Forest Baptists football team =

American college football season

1915 Wake Forest Baptists football
- Conference: Independent
- Record: 3–4
- Head coach: Wilbur C. Smith (2nd season)
- Captain: George G. Moore

1915 Southern college football independents records
	Conf.			Overall
Team	W	L	T	W		L		T
Georgia Tech		–		7	–	0	–	1
Ouachita Baptist		–		7	–	1	–	0
Dallas		–		6	–	1	–	0
Spring Hill		–		6	–	1	–	0
North Texas State Normal		–		5	–	1	–	1
Sam Houston Normal		–		5	–	1	–	1
West Virginia		–		5	–	1	–	1
Jonesboro Aggies		–		4	–	1	–	1
Johns Hopkins		–		6	–	2	–	0
VMI		–		6	–	2	–	1
Southwestern Louisiana Industrial		–		5	–	2	–	1
Delaware		–		6	–	3	–	0
Maryland		–		6	–	3	–	0
Louisiana Normal College		–		4	–	2	–	0
Southwest Texas State		–		5	–	3	–	2
Davidson		–		4	–	3	–	1
Mississippi Normal		–		4	–	3	–	0
West Tennessee State Normal		–		4	–	3	–	0
Guilford		–		1	–	1	–	0
Middle Tennessee State Normal		–		3	–	3	–	1
Birmingham		–		2	–	2	–	1
Presbyterian		–		4	–	4	–	0
Henderson-Brown		–		3	–	4	–	1
TCU		–		4	–	5	–	0
Wake Forest		–		3	–	4	–	0
Navy		–		3	–	5	–	1
Western Kentucky State Normal		–		1	–	4	–	2
Louisville		–		1	–	5	–	1
Marshall		–		1	–	7	–	0

The 1915 Wake Forest Baptists football team was an American football team that represented Wake Forest College (now known as Wake Forest University) as an independent during the 1915 college football season. In their second year under head coach Wilbur C. Smith, the team compiled a 3–4 record.

== Schedule ==
Date	Opponent	Site	Result	Source
September 25	Florence YMCA	Wake Forest, NC	W 80–0	
October 9	at North Carolina	Class Field; Chapel Hill, NC (rivalry)	L 0–35	
October 16	North Carolina A&M	Wake Forest, NC (rivalry)	L 0–7	
November 1	Richmond Blues	Wake Forest, NC	W 40–0	
November 6	at VMI	VMI Parade Ground; Lexington, VA	L 6–21	
November 13	Gallaudet	Wake Forest, NC	W 28–6	
November 25	vs. Davidson	Wearn Field; Charlotte, NC	L 7–21	
