= 1915 West Tennessee State Normal football team =

American college football season

1915 West Tennessee State Normal football
- Conference: Independent
- Record: 4–3
- Head coach: Clyde H. Wilson (4th season)
- Captain: Hugh Washburn
- Home stadium: Normal Field, Russwood Park

1915 Southern college football independents records
	Conf.			Overall
Team	W	L	T	W		L		T
Georgia Tech		–		7	–	0	–	1
Ouachita Baptist		–		7	–	1	–	0
Dallas		–		6	–	1	–	0
Spring Hill		–		6	–	1	–	0
North Texas State Normal		–		5	–	1	–	1
Sam Houston Normal		–		5	–	1	–	1
West Virginia		–		5	–	1	–	1
Jonesboro Aggies		–		4	–	1	–	1
Johns Hopkins		–		6	–	2	–	0
VMI		–		6	–	2	–	1
Southwestern Louisiana Industrial		–		5	–	2	–	1
Delaware		–		6	–	3	–	0
Maryland		–		6	–	3	–	0
Louisiana Normal College		–		4	–	2	–	0
Southwest Texas State		–		5	–	3	–	2
Davidson		–		4	–	3	–	1
Mississippi Normal		–		4	–	3	–	0
West Tennessee State Normal		–		4	–	3	–	0
Guilford		–		1	–	1	–	0
Middle Tennessee State Normal		–		3	–	3	–	1
Birmingham		–		2	–	2	–	1
Presbyterian		–		4	–	4	–	0
Henderson-Brown		–		3	–	4	–	1
TCU		–		4	–	5	–	0
Wake Forest		–		3	–	4	–	0
Navy		–		3	–	5	–	1
Western Kentucky State Normal		–		1	–	4	–	2
Louisville		–		1	–	5	–	1
Marshall		–		1	–	7	–	0

The 1915 West Tennessee State Normal football team was an American football team that represented West Tennessee State Normal School (now known as the University of Memphis) as an independent during the 1915 college football season. In their fourth season under head coach Clyde H. Wilson, West Tennessee State Normal compiled a 4–3 record.

== Schedule ==
Date	Time	Opponent	Site	Result	Attendance	Source
October 8		at Jonesboro Aggies	Kays Field; Jonesboro, AR (rivalry)	L 0–40	500	
October 16	2:00 p.m.	Somerville High School	Normal campus; Memphis, TN	W 75–0		
October 22	3:15 p.m.	Central High School	Red Elm; Memphis, TN	L 0–59		
October 30		Independents	Normal campus; Memphis, TN	W 53–18		
November 5	2:45 p.m.	Memphis University School	Russwood Park; Memphis, TN	L 0–14		
November 13	3:00 p.m.	First Separate Battalion (Tennessee Army National Guard)	Normal Field; Memphis, TN	W 45–0		
November 25		at Haywood County High School	Brownsville, TN	W 13–7		
