= 1915 Davidson football team =

American college football season

1915 Davidson football
- Conference: Independent
- Record: 4–3–1
- Head coach: Bill Fetzer (1st season)
- Home stadium: Sprunt Athletic Field

1915 Southern college football independents records
	Conf.			Overall
Team	W	L	T	W		L		T
Georgia Tech		–		7	–	0	–	1
Ouachita Baptist		–		7	–	1	–	0
Dallas		–		6	–	1	–	0
Spring Hill		–		6	–	1	–	0
North Texas State Normal		–		5	–	1	–	1
Sam Houston Normal		–		5	–	1	–	1
West Virginia		–		5	–	1	–	1
Jonesboro Aggies		–		4	–	1	–	1
Johns Hopkins		–		6	–	2	–	0
VMI		–		6	–	2	–	1
Southwestern Louisiana Industrial		–		5	–	2	–	1
Delaware		–		6	–	3	–	0
Maryland		–		6	–	3	–	0
Louisiana Normal College		–		4	–	2	–	0
Southwest Texas State		–		5	–	3	–	2
Davidson		–		4	–	3	–	1
Mississippi Normal		–		4	–	3	–	0
West Tennessee State Normal		–		4	–	3	–	0
Guilford		–		1	–	1	–	0
Middle Tennessee State Normal		–		3	–	3	–	1
Birmingham		–		2	–	2	–	1
Presbyterian		–		4	–	4	–	0
Henderson-Brown		–		3	–	4	–	1
TCU		–		4	–	5	–	0
Wake Forest		–		3	–	4	–	0
Navy		–		3	–	5	–	1
Western Kentucky State Normal		–		1	–	4	–	2
Louisville		–		1	–	5	–	1
Marshall		–		1	–	7	–	0

The 1915 Davidson football team was an American football team that represented the Davidson College as an independent during the 1915 college football season. In their first year under head coach Bill Fetzer, the team compiled a 4–3–1 record.

== Schedule ==
Date	Opponent	Site	Result	Source
September 25	at Washington and Lee	Wilson Field; Lexington, VA	L 0–14	
October 2	at Clemson	Riggs Field; Calhoun, SC	T 6–6	
October 9	at Georgia Tech	Grant Field; Atlanta, GA	L 7–21	
October 16	Wofford	Sprunt Athletic Field; Davidson, NC	W 45–0	
October 23	vs. Roanoke	Prince Albert Park; Winston-Salem, NC	W 13–0	
November 6	Furman	Sprunt Athletic Field; Davidson, NC	W 58–13	
November 13	vs. North Carolina	Prince Albert Park; Winston-Salem, NC	L 6–41	
November 25	vs. Wake Forest	Wearn Field; Charlotte, NC	W 21–7	
