= 1915 Spring Hill Badgers football team =

American college football season

1915 Spring Hill Badgers football
- Conference: Independent
- Record: 6–1
- Head coach: Red Harris (1st season)
- Captain: Morere
- Home stadium: Maxon Field

1915 Southern college football independents records
	Conf.			Overall
Team	W	L	T	W		L		T
Georgia Tech		–		7	–	0	–	1
Ouachita Baptist		–		7	–	1	–	0
Dallas		–		6	–	1	–	0
Spring Hill		–		6	–	1	–	0
North Texas State Normal		–		5	–	1	–	1
Sam Houston Normal		–		5	–	1	–	1
West Virginia		–		5	–	1	–	1
Jonesboro Aggies		–		4	–	1	–	1
Johns Hopkins		–		6	–	2	–	0
VMI		–		6	–	2	–	1
Southwestern Louisiana Industrial		–		5	–	2	–	1
Delaware		–		6	–	3	–	0
Maryland		–		6	–	3	–	0
Louisiana Normal College		–		4	–	2	–	0
Southwest Texas State		–		5	–	3	–	2
Davidson		–		4	–	3	–	1
Mississippi Normal		–		4	–	3	–	0
West Tennessee State Normal		–		4	–	3	–	0
Guilford		–		1	–	1	–	0
Middle Tennessee State Normal		–		3	–	3	–	1
Birmingham		–		2	–	2	–	1
Presbyterian		–		4	–	4	–	0
Henderson-Brown		–		3	–	4	–	1
TCU		–		4	–	5	–	0
Wake Forest		–		3	–	4	–	0
Navy		–		3	–	5	–	1
Western Kentucky State Normal		–		1	–	4	–	2
Louisville		–		1	–	5	–	1
Marshall		–		1	–	7	–	0

The 1915 Spring Hill Badgers football team represented the Spring Hill College as an independent during the 1915 college football season.

== Schedule ==
Date	Opponent	Site	Result	Source
September 26	Blue Stars	Maxon Field; Mobile, AL	W 37–0	
October 9	Wetumpka Aggies	Maxon Field; Mobile, AL	W 78–0	
October 16	at Tulane	Tulane Stadium; New Orleans, LA	L 13–35	
October 30	Gulf Coast Military Academy	Maxon Field; Mobile, AL	W 26–0	
November 6	Mississippi Normal	Maxon Field; Mobile, AL	W 33–6	
November 13	Southern	Maxon Field; Mobile, AL	W 19–6	
November 25	Howard (AL)	Maxon Field; Mobile, AL	W 6–0	
