= 1915 TCU Horned Frogs football team =

American college football season

1915 TCU Horned Frogs football
- Conference: Texas Intercollegiate Athletic Association
- Record: 4–5 (2–0 TIAA)
- Head coach: Ewing Y. Freeland (1st season)
- Captain: John P. Cox
- Home stadium: Y. M. C. A. Athletic Park

1915 Southern college football independents records
	Conf.			Overall
Team	W	L	T	W		L		T
Georgia Tech		–		7	–	0	–	1
Ouachita Baptist		–		7	–	1	–	0
Dallas		–		6	–	1	–	0
Spring Hill		–		6	–	1	–	0
North Texas State Normal		–		5	–	1	–	1
Sam Houston Normal		–		5	–	1	–	1
West Virginia		–		5	–	1	–	1
Jonesboro Aggies		–		4	–	1	–	1
Johns Hopkins		–		6	–	2	–	0
VMI		–		6	–	2	–	1
Southwestern Louisiana Industrial		–		5	–	2	–	1
Delaware		–		6	–	3	–	0
Maryland		–		6	–	3	–	0
Louisiana Normal College		–		4	–	2	–	0
Southwest Texas State		–		5	–	3	–	2
Davidson		–		4	–	3	–	1
Mississippi Normal		–		4	–	3	–	0
West Tennessee State Normal		–		4	–	3	–	0
Guilford		–		1	–	1	–	0
Middle Tennessee State Normal		–		3	–	3	–	1
Birmingham		–		2	–	2	–	1
Presbyterian		–		4	–	4	–	0
Henderson-Brown		–		3	–	4	–	1
TCU		–		4	–	5	–	0
Wake Forest		–		3	–	4	–	0
Navy		–		3	–	5	–	1
Western Kentucky State Normal		–		1	–	4	–	2
Louisville		–		1	–	5	–	1
Marshall		–		1	–	7	–	0

The 1915 TCU Horned Frogs football team represented Texas Christian University (TCU) as a member of the Texas Intercollegiate Athletic Association during the 1915 college football season. Led by Ewing Y. Freeland in his first and only year as head coach, the Horned Frogs compiled an overall record of 4–5. TCU their home games in Fort Worth, Texas. The team's captain was John P. Cox, who played fullback. The school adopted the Horned Frogs nickname in the spring of 1915.

== Schedule ==
Date	Time	Opponent	Site	Result	Source
October 2		at Texas*	Clark Field; Austin, TX (rivalry)	L 0–72	
October 9	3:30 p.m.	SMU*	TCU campus; Fort Worth, TX (rivalry)	W 43–0	
October 15		Texas A&M*	Y. M. C. A. Athletic Park; Fort Worth, TX (rivalry)	L 10–13	
October 19		vs. Austin	Dallas Fair; Dallas, TX	W 28–0	
October 30		at Rice*	Rice Field; Houston, TX	L 3–33	
November 6		at Trinity (TX)*	Waxahachie, TX	W 25–0	
November 12	3:30 p.m.	Southwestern (TX)	Y. M. C. A. Athletic Park; Fort Worth, TX	W 21–0	
November 16	3:30 p.m.	Oklahoma A&M*	Y. M. C. A. Athletic Park; Fort Worth, TX	L 0–13	
November 25	2:00 p.m.	at Baylor*	Carroll Field; Waco, TX (rivalry)	L 0–51	
*Non-conference game
