= 1915 Guilford Quakers football team =

American college football season

1915 Guilford Quakers football
- Conference: Independent
- Record: 1–1
- Head coach: William E. Moore (1st season)

1915 Southern college football independents records
	Conf.			Overall
Team	W	L	T	W		L		T
Georgia Tech		–		7	–	0	–	1
Ouachita Baptist		–		7	–	1	–	0
Dallas		–		6	–	1	–	0
Spring Hill		–		6	–	1	–	0
North Texas State Normal		–		5	–	1	–	1
Sam Houston Normal		–		5	–	1	–	1
West Virginia		–		5	–	1	–	1
Jonesboro Aggies		–		4	–	1	–	1
Johns Hopkins		–		6	–	2	–	0
VMI		–		6	–	2	–	1
Southwestern Louisiana Industrial		–		5	–	2	–	1
Delaware		–		6	–	3	–	0
Maryland		–		6	–	3	–	0
Louisiana Normal College		–		4	–	2	–	0
Southwest Texas State		–		5	–	3	–	2
Davidson		–		4	–	3	–	1
Mississippi Normal		–		4	–	3	–	0
West Tennessee State Normal		–		4	–	3	–	0
Guilford		–		1	–	1	–	0
Middle Tennessee State Normal		–		3	–	3	–	1
Birmingham		–		2	–	2	–	1
Presbyterian		–		4	–	4	–	0
Henderson-Brown		–		3	–	4	–	1
TCU		–		4	–	5	–	0
Wake Forest		–		3	–	4	–	0
Navy		–		3	–	5	–	1
Western Kentucky State Normal		–		1	–	4	–	2
Louisville		–		1	–	5	–	1
Marshall		–		1	–	7	–	0

The 1915 Guilford Quakers football team represented Guilford College as an independent during the 1915 college football season. The team was coached by Professor William E. Moore, an English teacher who started work at the school that same year.

The short schedule of non-collegiate games was seen as an exciting first step back towards intercollegiate athletics at Guilford, which had not fielded such a football team since 1904. Despite this, the season has been largely overlooked by even contemporary sportswriters of the time, who focused more on the fact that Guilford's 1917 season was their first season of full intercollegiate play, with a summary of recent football in the 1918 yearbook The Quaker failing to even mention the season; the season was similarly ignored in a 1917 article chronicling the close of their season, which noted that the team competed "on the gridiron for the first time in 13 years".

The team was organized on October 1, 1915, fairly late in the season; by this time, most collegiate teams had already organized and planned their schedule for the year. Combined with their lack of a recent team, the short and informal schedule makes sense.

== Schedule ==
Date	Opponent	Site	Result	Source
October 30	North Carolina freshmen	Greensboro, NC	L 12–13	
November 25	High Point Independents	Greensboro, NC	W 37–0	
