= 1914 Notre Dame Fighting Irish football team =

American college football season

1914 Notre Dame Fighting Irish football
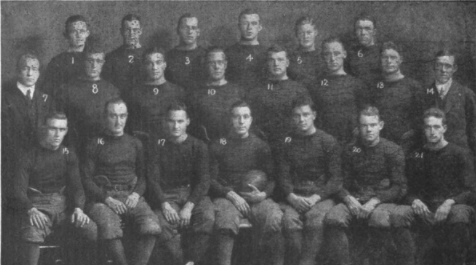
- Conference: Independent
- Record: 6–2
- Head coach: Jesse Harper (2nd season)
- Offensive scheme: Single-wing
- Captain: Keith K. "Deak" Jones
- Home stadium: Cartier Field

1914 Midwestern college football independents records
	Conf.			Overall
Team	W	L	T	W		L		T
Western State Normal (MI)		–		6	–	0	–	0
Northern Illinois State		–		7	–	0	–	1
Notre Dame		–		6	–	2	–	0
Michigan Agricultural		–		5	–	2	–	0
Butler		–		4	–	2	–	0
South Dakota		–		5	–	2	–	1
Michigan		–		6	–	3	–	0
North Dakota Agricultural		–		5	–	3	–	0
Haskell		–		5	–	4	–	0
Michigan State Normal		–		3	–	2	–	1
Heidelberg		–		4	–	3	–	1
Akron		–		4	–	4	–	1
Doane		–		3	–	3	–	2
Saint Louis		–		4	–	4	–	0
St. Mary's (OH)		–		2	–	2	–	0
Wabash		–		2	–	2	–	2
Detroit		–		2	–	3	–	2
Lake Forest		–		3	–	5	–	0
Iowa State Teachers		–		2	–	5	–	1
Lincoln (MO)		–		1	–	3	–	0
Marquette		–		2	–	7	–	0
Rose Poly		–		0	–	7	–	0

The 1914 Notre Dame Fighting Irish football team was an American football team that represented the University of Notre Dame as an independent during the 1914 college football season. In their second year under head coach Jesse Harper, the Irish compiled a 6–2 record and outscored opponents by a total of 288 to 61. After opening the season with routs of Alma (56–0) and Rose Polytechnic (103–0), the team lost road games to Yale (0–28) and national champion Army (7–20). The team then closed its season with intersectional victories over Pop Warner's Carlisle Indians (48–6) at Comiskey Park in Chicago and on the road against Syracuse (20–0).

Knute Rockne, who helped the Irish to perfect seasons in 1912 and 1913, returned in 1914 as an assistant coach. Key players on the 1914 team included tackle and captain Keith K. "Deak" Jones, fullback Ray Eichenlaub, halfback Bill Kelleher, and guard Charlie Bachman.

The team played its home games at Cartier Field in Notre Dame, Indiana.

== Schedule ==
Date	Opponent	Site	Result	Attendance	Source
October 3	Alma	Cartier Field; Notre Dame, IN	W 56–0		
October 10	Rose Polytechnic	Cartier Field; Notre Dame, IN	W 103–0		
October 17	at Yale	Yale Field; New Haven, CT	L 0–28		
October 24	vs. South Dakota	Sioux Falls, SD	W 33–0	4,000	
October 31	Haskell	Cartier Field; Notre Dame, IN	W 21–7		
November 7	at Army	The Plain; West Point, NY (rivalry)	L 7–20	6,000	
November 14	vs. Carlisle	Comiskey Park; Chicago, IL	W 48–6		
November 26	at Syracuse	Archbold Stadium; Syracuse, NY	W 20–0		

== Personnel ==
=== Players ===
- Charlie Bachman, guard
- Harry Baujan, end
- Alvin "Heine" Berger, halfback
- Stan Cofall, halfback
- Ray Eichenlaub, fullback
- Freeman Fitzgerald, center
- George N. "Ducky" Holmes, tackle
- Keith K. "Deak" Jones, tackle and captain
- Emmett Keefe, guard
- Bill Kelleher, halfback
- Arthur B. "Bunny" Larkin, halfback
- Ralph G. Lathrop, tackle
- Rupert Mills, end
- Leo J. Stephan, guard

=== Coaching staff ===
- Head coach - Jesse Harper
- Assistant coach - Knute Rockne
