= 1914 University of Akron football team =

American college football season

1914 Akron football
- Conference: Independent
- Record: 4–4–1
- Head coach: Frank Haggerty (5th season)
- Captain: Park Crisp
- Home stadium: Butchtel Field

1914 Midwestern college football independents records
| | Conf. | | | Overall |
| Team | W | L | T | W | | L | | T |
|---|---|---|---|---|---|---|---|---|
| Western State Normal (MI) | | – | | 6 | – | 0 | – | 0 |
| Northern Illinois State | | – | | 7 | – | 0 | – | 1 |
| Notre Dame | | – | | 6 | – | 2 | – | 0 |
| Michigan Agricultural | | – | | 5 | – | 2 | – | 0 |
| Butler | | – | | 4 | – | 2 | – | 0 |
| South Dakota | | – | | 5 | – | 2 | – | 1 |
| Michigan | | – | | 6 | – | 3 | – | 0 |
| North Dakota Agricultural | | – | | 5 | – | 3 | – | 0 |
| Haskell | | – | | 5 | – | 4 | – | 0 |
| Michigan State Normal | | – | | 3 | – | 2 | – | 1 |
| Heidelberg | | – | | 4 | – | 3 | – | 1 |
| Akron | | – | | 4 | – | 4 | – | 1 |
| Doane | | – | | 3 | – | 3 | – | 2 |
| Saint Louis | | – | | 4 | – | 4 | – | 0 |
| St. Mary's (OH) | | – | | 2 | – | 2 | – | 0 |
| Wabash | | – | | 2 | – | 2 | – | 2 |
| Detroit | | – | | 2 | – | 3 | – | 2 |
| Lake Forest | | – | | 3 | – | 5 | – | 0 |
| Iowa State Teachers | | – | | 2 | – | 5 | – | 1 |
| Lincoln (MO) | | – | | 1 | – | 3 | – | 0 |
| Marquette | | – | | 2 | – | 7 | – | 0 |
| Rose Poly | | – | | 0 | – | 7 | – | 0 |

The 1914 Akron football team represented the University of Akron, formerly Buchtel College, in the 1914 college football season. The team was led by head coach Frank Haggerty, in his fifth season. Akron was outscored by their opponents by a total of 122–134.

== Schedule ==
| Date | Opponent | Site | Result | Attendance | Source |
|---|---|---|---|---|---|
| September 26 | Case | Akron, OH | W 7–0 | | |
| October 3 | Wooster | Akron, OH | W 13–0 | | |
| October 10 | Marietta | Butchtel Field; Akron, OH | L 7–12 | 1,200 | |
| October 17 | Allegheny | Akron, OH | T 3–3 | | |
| October 24 | Kenyon | Akron, OH | W 9–7 | | |
| October 31 | at Michigan Agricultural | College Field; East Lansing, MI | L 6–75 | | |
| November 7 | Wittenberg | Akron, OH | W 47–3 | | |
| November 14 | Western Reserve | Akron, OH | L 6–13 | | |
| November 26 | at Culver Military Academy | Culver, IN | L 20–27 | | |
