= 1914 Alma Maroon and Cream football team =

American college football season

1914 Alma Maroon and Cream football
- Conference: Michigan Intercollegiate Athletic Association
- Record: 2–5–1 (0–2 MIAA)
- Head coach: Wilfred C. Bleamaster (3rd season)

1914 Michigan Intercollegiate Athletic Association football standings
	Conf.					Overall
Team	W		L		T	W		L		T
Olivet +	3	–	1	–	0	5	–	3	–	0
Hillsdale +	3	–	1	–	0	3	–	3	–	1
Kalamazoo	3	–	1	–	0	4	–	1	–	0
Albion	1	–	4	–	0	1	–	6	–	0
Adrian	0	–	1	–	0	3	–	3	–	0
Alma	0	–	2	–	0	2	–	5	–	1
+ – Conference co-champions

The 1914 Alma Maroon and Cream football team represented Alma College as a member of the Michigan Intercollegiate Athletic Association (MIAA) during the 1914 college football season. Led by third-year head coach Wilfred C. Bleamaster, Alma compiled an overall record of 2–5–1 with a mark of 0–2 in conference play.

== Schedule ==
Date	Opponent	Site	Result	Source
September 26	Bay City High School*		W 44–0	
October 3	Notre Dame*	Cartier Field; South Bend, IN	L 0–56	
October 10	Michigan Agricultural*	College Field; East Lansing, MI	L 0–60	
October 16	Michigan State Normal*	Davis Field; Alma, MI	T 0–0	
October 24	Michigan freshmen*	Ann Arbor, MI	L 0–46	
October 31	Albion	Albion, MI	L 0–21	
November 7	Ferris Institute*	Alma, MI	W 33–0	
November 14	Olivet	Alma, MI	L 3–7	
*Non-conference game
