= 1914 Michigan Agricultural Aggies football team =

American college football season

1914 Michigan Agricultural Aggies football
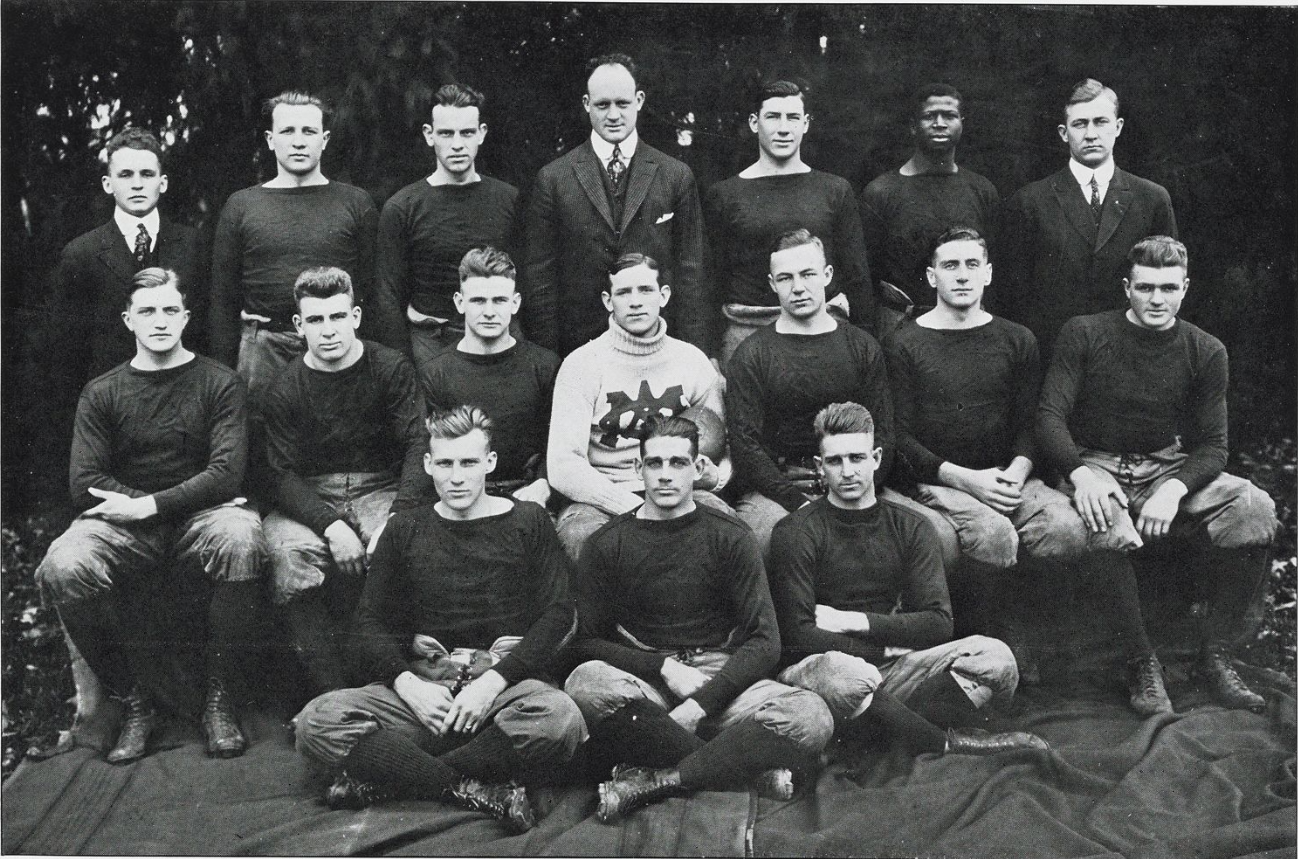
- Conference: Independent
- Record: 5–2
- Head coach: John Macklin (4th season)
- Captain: George E. Julian
- Home stadium: College Field

1914 Midwestern college football independents records
	Conf.			Overall
Team	W	L	T	W		L		T
Western State Normal (MI)		–		6	–	0	–	0
Northern Illinois State		–		7	–	0	–	1
Notre Dame		–		6	–	2	–	0
Michigan Agricultural		–		5	–	2	–	0
Butler		–		4	–	2	–	0
South Dakota		–		5	–	2	–	1
Michigan		–		6	–	3	–	0
North Dakota Agricultural		–		5	–	3	–	0
Haskell		–		5	–	4	–	0
Michigan State Normal		–		3	–	2	–	1
Heidelberg		–		4	–	3	–	1
Akron		–		4	–	4	–	1
Doane		–		3	–	3	–	2
Saint Louis		–		4	–	4	–	0
St. Mary's (OH)		–		2	–	2	–	0
Wabash		–		2	–	2	–	2
Detroit		–		2	–	3	–	2
Lake Forest		–		3	–	5	–	0
Iowa State Teachers		–		2	–	5	–	1
Lincoln (MO)		–		1	–	3	–	0
Marquette		–		2	–	7	–	0
Rose Poly		–		0	–	7	–	0

The 1914 Michigan Agricultural Aggies football team represented Michigan Agricultural College (MAC) as an independent during the 1914 college football season. In their fourth year under head coach John Macklin, the Aggies compiled a 5–2 record and outscored their opponents 188 to 57.

== Schedule ==
Date	Opponent	Site	Result	Attendance
October 3	Olivet	College Field; East Lansing, MI	W 35–7	
October 10	Alma	College Field; East Lansing, MI	W 60–0	
October 17	Michigan	College Field; East Lansing, MI (rivalry)	L 0–3	8,934
October 24	at Nebraska	Nebraska Field; Lincoln, NE	L 0–24	
October 31	University of Akron	College Field; East Lansing, MI	W 75–6	
November 7	Mount Union	College Field; East Lansing, MI	W 21–14	
November 13	at Penn State	New Beaver Field; State College, PA (rivalry)	W 6–3	10,000

== Game summaries ==
=== Michigan ===
Week 5: Michigan at M. A. C.

Team	1	2	3	4	Total
• Michigan	0	0	0	3	3
M. A. C.	0	0	0	0	0

- Date: October 17, 1914
- Location: College Field
  East Lansing, MI

On October 17, 1914, Michigan Agricultural lost a close game against Michigan by 3-0 score at College Field in East Lansing.
