= 1910–11 Baylor Bears basketball team =

American college basketball season

1910–11 Baylor Bears men's basketball
- Conference: Independent
- Record: 8-3 (8-3 Independent)
- Head coach: Ralph Glaze

The 1910-11 Baylor Bears basketball team represented the Baylor University during the 1910-11 college men's basketball season.

== Schedule ==
| Date time, TV | Opponent | Result | Record | Site city, state |
|---|---|---|---|---|
| | Texas | L 37-40 | 0-1 | Waco, TX |
| | at Texas | W 42-34 | 1-1 | Austin, TX |
| | SAN Antonio YMCA | W 41-20 | 2-1 | Waco, TX |
| | SAN Antonio YMCA | W 36-28 | 3-1 | Waco, TX |
| | TCU | L 26-30 | 3-2 | Waco, TX |
| | TCU | W 32-24 | 4-2 | Waco, TX |
| | Decatur College | W 28-27 | 5-2 | Waco, TX |
| | Decatur College | L 21-30 | 5-3 | Waco, TX |
| | Poly College | W 28-24 | 6-3 | Waco, TX |
| | Poly College | W 36-14 | 7-3 | Waco, TX |
| | Waco YMCA | W 36-14 | 8-3 | Waco, TX |
*Non-conference game. (#) Tournament seedings in parentheses.
