= 1914 Saint Louis Billikens football team =

American college football season

1914 Saint Louis Billikens football
- Conference: Independent
- Record: 4–4
- Head coach: George Keogan (1st season)
- Home stadium: Saint Louis University campus

1914 Midwestern college football independents records
	Conf.			Overall
Team	W	L	T	W		L		T
Western State Normal (MI)		–		6	–	0	–	0
Northern Illinois State		–		7	–	0	–	1
Notre Dame		–		6	–	2	–	0
Michigan Agricultural		–		5	–	2	–	0
Butler		–		4	–	2	–	0
South Dakota		–		5	–	2	–	1
Michigan		–		6	–	3	–	0
North Dakota Agricultural		–		5	–	3	–	0
Haskell		–		5	–	4	–	0
Michigan State Normal		–		3	–	2	–	1
Heidelberg		–		4	–	3	–	1
Akron		–		4	–	4	–	1
Doane		–		3	–	3	–	2
Saint Louis		–		4	–	4	–	0
St. Mary's (OH)		–		2	–	2	–	0
Wabash		–		2	–	2	–	2
Detroit		–		2	–	3	–	2
Lake Forest		–		3	–	5	–	0
Iowa State Teachers		–		2	–	5	–	1
Lincoln (MO)		–		1	–	3	–	0
Marquette		–		2	–	7	–	0
Rose Poly		–		0	–	7	–	0

The 1914 Saint Louis Billikens football team was an American football team that represented Saint Louis University as an independent during the 1914 college football season. In their first season under head coach George Keogan, the Billikens compiled a record of 4–4. The team played home game at the Saint Louis University campus in St. Louis.

== Schedule ==
Date	Time	Opponent	Site	Result	Attendance	Source
September 26	3:00 p.m.	Central High School	Saint Louis University campus; St. Louis, MO	T 7–7 (scrimmage)		
October 3		Millikin	Saint Louis University campus; St. Louis, MO	L 7–13		
October 10		Southern Illinois Normal	Saint Louis University campus; St. Louis, MO	W 20–0		
October 17		at Arkansas	Fayetteville, AR	L 0–34		
October 24		Blackburn	Saint Louis University campus; St. Louis, MO	W 104–0		
October 30		at Christian University	Canton, MO	W 77–0		
November 7	3:05 p.m.	at Washington University	Francis Field; St. Louis, MO	L 0–6	10,000	
November 14	3:00 p.m.	Marquette	Saint Louis University campus; St. Louis, MO	W 14–7	2,000	
November 26	2:30 p.m.	Missouri Mines	Saint Louis University campus; St. Louis, MO	L 0–63		
