= 1914 Rose Polytechnic football team =

American college football season

1914 Rose Polytechnic football
- Conference: Independent
- Record: 0–7
- Head coach: Herbert Huebel (2nd season)

1914 Midwestern college football independents records
	Conf.			Overall
Team	W	L	T	W		L		T
Western State Normal (MI)		–		6	–	0	–	0
Northern Illinois State		–		7	–	0	–	1
Notre Dame		–		6	–	2	–	0
Michigan Agricultural		–		5	–	2	–	0
Butler		–		4	–	2	–	0
South Dakota		–		5	–	2	–	1
Michigan		–		6	–	3	–	0
North Dakota Agricultural		–		5	–	3	–	0
Haskell		–		5	–	4	–	0
Michigan State Normal		–		3	–	2	–	1
Heidelberg		–		4	–	3	–	1
Akron		–		4	–	4	–	1
Doane		–		3	–	3	–	2
Saint Louis		–		4	–	4	–	0
St. Mary's (OH)		–		2	–	2	–	0
Wabash		–		2	–	2	–	2
Detroit		–		2	–	3	–	2
Lake Forest		–		3	–	5	–	0
Iowa State Teachers		–		2	–	5	–	1
Lincoln (MO)		–		1	–	3	–	0
Marquette		–		2	–	7	–	0
Rose Poly		–		0	–	7	–	0

The 1914 Rose Polytechnic football team represented Rose Polytechnic Institute—now known as Rose–Hulman Institute of Technology—as an independent during the 1914 college football season. Led by second-year head Herbert Huebel, the team compiled a record of 0–7.

== Schedule ==
Date	Opponent	Site	Result	Source
October 3	at Eastern Illinois	Charleston, IL	L 6–23	
October 10	at Notre Dame	Cartier Field; South Bend, IN	L 0–103	
October 17	at Wabash	Ingalls Field; Crawfordsville, IN	L 6–34	
October 24	at DePauw	Greencastle, IN	L 0–20	
October 31	Franklin (IN)	Terre Haute, IN	L 0–7	
November 7	Earlham	Terre Haute, IN	L 7–26	
November 21	at Louisville	Louisville, KY	L 0–23	
