= George M. Lawton =

American football player and coach (1886–1941)

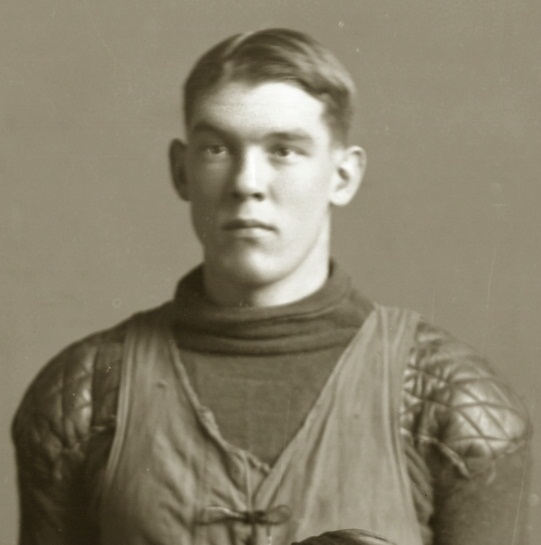
- Lawton from 1910 Michigan football team portrait

Biographical details
- Born: August 3, 1886; Ridgetown, Ontario, Canada
- Died: September 30, 1941 (aged 55); Scio Township, Michigan, U.S.

Playing career
- 1908–1910: Michigan
- Positions: Fullback, punter

Coaching career (HC unless noted)
- 1913–1914: Detroit

Head coaching record
- Overall: 7–6–3

George Morrison Lawton (August 3, 1886 – September 30, 1941) was an American football player and coach. He played at the fullback and punter positions for the University of Michigan football team from 1908 to 1910. He was the head coach for the University of Detroit Titans football team for the 1913 and 1914 seasons.

== Early years ==
Lawton was born in Ridgetown, Ontario, Canada in 1886. He moved with his parents to Detroit, Michigan as an infant. His father, Thomas M. Lawton was a prominent physician in Detroit for 25 years. Lawton was educated in the Detroit public schools and graduated from Detroit Central High School.

== University of Michigan ==
Lawton enrolled in the law department at the University of Michigan and received his LL.B. degree in 1911. While attending Michigan, he played for Fielding H. Yost's Michigan Wolverines football team as a fullback and punter from 1908 to 1910.

== Coaching career ==
In August 1913, Lawton was hired as the head coach of Detroit Titans football team. He served in that capacity from 1913 to 1914. In two seasons as the team's head coach, he compiled a record of 6–6–3 (.500).

== Curling ==
At the age of 43 he skipped the Michigan rink at the demonstration curling event at the 1932 Winter Olympics

== Business career and family ==
After graduating from Michigan, Lawton was admitted to the Michigan bar, but he never practiced as an attorney. He worked for several years on YMCA activities in Minneapolis, Minnesota, in the circulation department of The Detroit News, and in the real estate business. In 1913, he formed an insurance partnership called Lawton & Ouellette in Detroit. He worked for many years in the insurance business and also officiated at college and high school football games. Lawton married Laura Bessie Newton in 1917, and they had five children, Thomas Stanley, Bessie Jean, Louie Jane, Diana Howard and George Francis Eugene.

Lawton's brother, J. Fred Lawton, wrote the song "Varsity" for the Michigan football team. Lawton died in 1941 after several months of illness at his home in Ann Arbor at age 55.

== Head coaching record ==
Year	Team	Overall	Conference	Standing	Bowl/playoffs
Detroit Tigers (Independent) (1913–1914)
1913	Detroit	5–3–1			
1914	Detroit	2–3–2			
Detroit College:		7–6–3			
Total:		7–6–3			
