= 1914 North Dakota Agricultural Aggies football team =

American college football season

1914 North Dakota Agricultural Aggies football
- Conference: Independent
- Record: 5–3
- Head coach: Howard Wood (2nd season)
- Captain: Ralph Coulkins
- Home stadium: Dacotah Field

1914 Midwestern college football independents records
	Conf.			Overall
Team	W	L	T	W		L		T
Western State Normal (MI)		–		6	–	0	–	0
Northern Illinois State		–		7	–	0	–	1
Notre Dame		–		6	–	2	–	0
Michigan Agricultural		–		5	–	2	–	0
Butler		–		4	–	2	–	0
South Dakota		–		5	–	2	–	1
Michigan		–		6	–	3	–	0
North Dakota Agricultural		–		5	–	3	–	0
Haskell		–		5	–	4	–	0
Michigan State Normal		–		3	–	2	–	1
Heidelberg		–		4	–	3	–	1
Akron		–		4	–	4	–	1
Doane		–		3	–	3	–	2
Saint Louis		–		4	–	4	–	0
St. Mary's (OH)		–		2	–	2	–	0
Wabash		–		2	–	2	–	2
Detroit		–		2	–	3	–	2
Lake Forest		–		3	–	5	–	0
Iowa State Teachers		–		2	–	5	–	1
Lincoln (MO)		–		1	–	3	–	0
Marquette		–		2	–	7	–	0
Rose Poly		–		0	–	7	–	0

The 1914 North Dakota Agricultural Aggies football team was an American football team that represented North Dakota Agricultural College (now known as North Dakota State University) as an independent during the 1914 college football season. In their second year under head coach Howard Wood, the team compiled a 5–3 record.

== Schedule ==
Date	Opponent	Site	Result	Source
October 3	at Jamestown	Jamestown, ND	W 19–7	
October 10	Wahpeton	Dacotah Field; Fargo, ND	W 40–0	
October 17	St. Thomas (MN)	Dacotah Field; Fargo, ND	L 12–21	
October 24	Macalester	Dacotah Field; Fargo, ND	W 10–7	
October 31	Fargo	Dacotah Field; Fargo, ND	W Forfeit 1–0	
November 7	at North Dakota	Dakota Field; Grand Forks, ND (rivalry)	W 7–6	
November 14	at Montana	Dornblaser Field; Missoula, MT	L 0–13	
November 18	at Montana A&M	Bozeman, MT	L 0–18	
