= 1914 Haskell Indians football team =

American college football season

1914 Haskell Indians football
- Conference: Independent
- Record: 5–4
- Head coach: A. R. Kennedy (4th season)

1914 Midwestern college football independents records
	Conf.			Overall
Team	W	L	T	W		L		T
Western State Normal (MI)		–		6	–	0	–	0
Northern Illinois State		–		7	–	0	–	1
Notre Dame		–		6	–	2	–	0
Michigan Agricultural		–		5	–	2	–	0
Butler		–		4	–	2	–	0
South Dakota		–		5	–	2	–	1
Michigan		–		6	–	3	–	0
North Dakota Agricultural		–		5	–	3	–	0
Haskell		–		5	–	4	–	0
Michigan State Normal		–		3	–	2	–	1
Heidelberg		–		4	–	3	–	1
Akron		–		4	–	4	–	1
Doane		–		3	–	3	–	2
Saint Louis		–		4	–	4	–	0
St. Mary's (OH)		–		2	–	2	–	0
Wabash		–		2	–	2	–	2
Detroit		–		2	–	3	–	2
Lake Forest		–		3	–	5	–	0
Iowa State Teachers		–		2	–	5	–	1
Lincoln (MO)		–		1	–	3	–	0
Marquette		–		2	–	7	–	0
Rose Poly		–		0	–	7	–	0

The 1914 Haskell Indians football team was an American football team that represented the Haskell Indian Institute (now known as Haskell Indian Nations University) as an independent during the 1914 college football season. In its fourth season under head coach A. R. Kennedy, Haskell compiled a 5–4 record and outscored opponents by a total of 200 to 89. Its victories included games against Texas A&M and LSU; its losses included games against Notre Dame, Texas, and Oklahoma.

== Schedule ==
Date	Time	Opponent	Site	Result	Attendance	Source
September 26		Kansas City University	Lawrence, KS	W 82–0		
October 2		Kansas State Normal	Lawrence, KS	W 13–6		
October 10		vs. Christian Brothers (MO)	Association Park; Kansas City, MO	L 0–6	1,000	
October 17		at Creighton	Omaha, NE	W 38–0		
October 23		vs. Texas A&M	Morris Park; Fort Worth, TX	W 10–0	3,000	
October 31		at Notre Dame	Cartier Field; Notre Dame, IN	L 7–21		
November 7	3:00 p.m.	vs. Texas	West End Park; Houston, TX	L 7–23	5,300	
November 14		vs. LSU	Pelican Park; New Orleans, LA	W 31–0		
November 26		vs. Oklahoma	Association Park; Kansas City, MO	L 12–33	5,000	
