= Howard Wood (coach) =

American college sports coach

Biographical details
- Born: March 3, 1883; Marvelville, Ontario, Canada
- Died: February 21, 1949 (aged 65); Sioux Falls, South Dakota, U.S.
- Education: New York State Normal

Coaching career (HC unless noted)

Football
- 1908–1912: Sioux Falls Washington HS (SD)
- 1913–1914: North Dakota Agricultural
- 1915–1947: Sioux Falls Washington HS (SD)

Basketball
- 1913–1915: North Dakota Agricultural
- 1915–1948: Sioux Falls Washington HS (SD)

Baseball
- 1915: North Dakota Agricultural

Head coaching record
- Overall: 5–5–2 (college football); 22–4 (college basketball); 8–7 (college baseball); 246–74–16 (high school football); 430–141 (high school basketball)

Howard Wood (March 3, 1883 – February 21, 1949) was an American football, basketball, and baseball coach. He served as the head football coach at North Dakota Agricultural College—now known as North Dakota State University—from 1913 to 1914, compiling a record of North Dakota Agricultural College. Wood was also as the head basketball coach at North Dakota Agricultural from 1913 to 1915, amassing a record of 22–4, and the school's head baseball coach in 1915, tallying a mark of 8–7.

Wood was a native of Potsdam, New York and a graduate of Purdue University. He died on February 21, 1949, at a hospital in Sioux Falls, South Dakota.

== Head coaching record ==
=== College football ===
Year	Team	Overall	Conference	Standing	Bowl/playoffs
North Dakota Agricultural Aggies (Independent) (1913–1914)
1913	North Dakota Agricultural	0–2–2			
1914	North Dakota Agricultural	5–3			
North Dakota Agricultural:		5–5–2			
Total:		5–5–2			
