= 1914 Western State Normal Hilltoppers football team =

American college football season

1914 Western State Normal Hilltoppers football
- Conference: Independent
- Record: 6–0
- Head coach: William H. Spaulding (8th season)
- Captain: William Anderson
- Home stadium: Normal athletic field

1914 Midwestern college football independents records
	Conf.			Overall
Team	W	L	T	W		L		T
Western State Normal (MI)		–		6	–	0	–	0
Northern Illinois State		–		7	–	0	–	1
Notre Dame		–		6	–	2	–	0
Michigan Agricultural		–		5	–	2	–	0
Butler		–		4	–	2	–	0
South Dakota		–		5	–	2	–	1
Michigan		–		6	–	3	–	0
North Dakota Agricultural		–		5	–	3	–	0
Haskell		–		5	–	4	–	0
Michigan State Normal		–		3	–	2	–	1
Heidelberg		–		4	–	3	–	1
Akron		–		4	–	4	–	1
Doane		–		3	–	3	–	2
Saint Louis		–		4	–	4	–	0
St. Mary's (OH)		–		2	–	2	–	0
Wabash		–		2	–	2	–	2
Detroit		–		2	–	3	–	2
Lake Forest		–		3	–	5	–	0
Iowa State Teachers		–		2	–	5	–	1
Lincoln (MO)		–		1	–	3	–	0
Marquette		–		2	–	7	–	0
Rose Poly		–		0	–	7	–	0

The 1914 Western State Normal Hilltoppers football team was an American football team that represented Western State Normal School (later renamed Western Michigan University) as an independent during the 1914 college football season. In their eighth season under head coach William H. Spaulding (who later went on to coach at Minnesota and UCLA), the Hilltoppers compiled a perfect 6–0 record, shut out five of six opponents.

== Schedule ==
Date	Time	Opponent	Site	Result	Attendance	Source
October 2	3:00 p.m.	Battle Creek Training School	Normal athletic field; Kalamazoo, MI	W 37–0		
October 10	3:15 p.m.	Olivet	Normal athletic field; Kalamazoo, MI	W 3–0		
October 17	3:00 p.m.	at Albion	Albion, MI	W 43–0		
October 23		Ferris Institute	Normal athletic field; Kalamazoo, MI	W 68–0		
October 31		Hillsdale	Normal athletic field; Kalamazoo, MI	W 28–7		
November 13	2:30 p.m.	at Michigan State Normal	Ypsilanti, MI	W 10–0	2,000	
