= 1914 Northern Illinois State Normal football team =

American college football season

1914 Northern Illinois State Normal football
- Conference: Independent
- Record: 7–0–1
- Head coach: William Wirtz (5th season)
- Captain: Kennard Seyller
- Home stadium: Glidden Field

1914 Midwestern college football independents records
	Conf.			Overall
Team	W	L	T	W		L		T
Western State Normal (MI)		–		6	–	0	–	0
Northern Illinois State		–		7	–	0	–	1
Notre Dame		–		6	–	2	–	0
Michigan Agricultural		–		5	–	2	–	0
Butler		–		4	–	2	–	0
South Dakota		–		5	–	2	–	1
Michigan		–		6	–	3	–	0
North Dakota Agricultural		–		5	–	3	–	0
Haskell		–		5	–	4	–	0
Michigan State Normal		–		3	–	2	–	1
Heidelberg		–		4	–	3	–	1
Akron		–		4	–	4	–	1
Doane		–		3	–	3	–	2
Saint Louis		–		4	–	4	–	0
St. Mary's (OH)		–		2	–	2	–	0
Wabash		–		2	–	2	–	2
Detroit		–		2	–	3	–	2
Lake Forest		–		3	–	5	–	0
Iowa State Teachers		–		2	–	5	–	1
Lincoln (MO)		–		1	–	3	–	0
Marquette		–		2	–	7	–	0
Rose Poly		–		0	–	7	–	0

The 1914 Northern Illinois State Normal football team represented Northern Illinois State Normal College as an independent in the 1914 college football season. They were led by fifth-year head coach William Wirtz and played their home games at Glidden Field, located on the east end of campus. The team finished the season with a 7–0–1 record. Kennard Seyller was the team's captain.

== Schedule ==
Date	Opponent	Site	Result	Source
October 3	at Wheaton (IL)	Wheaton, IL	W 7–3	
October 10	Mount Morris	Glidden Field; DeKalb, IL	W 38–0	
October 17	at Aurora	Aurora, IL	W 14–7	
October 24	Wheaton (IL)	Glidden Field; DeKalb, IL	W 29–3	
October 31	at Mount Morris	Mount Morris, IL	W 7–0	
November 7	at North-Western College	Naperville, IL	W 10–0	
November 14	Rochelle High School	Glidden Field; DeKalb, IL	W 43–0	
November 21	Aurora	Glidden Field; DeKalb, IL	T 0–0	
