= 1912–13 Baylor Bears basketball team =

American college basketball season

1912–13 Baylor Bears men's basketball
- Conference: Independent
- Record: 5-4 (5-4 Independent)
- Head coach: Ralph Glaze

The 1912-13 Baylor Bears basketball team represented the Baylor University during the 1912-13 college men's basketball season.

== Schedule ==
Date time, TV	Opponent	Result	Record	Site city, state
	Southwestern	W 32-17	1-0	Waco, TX
	Texas	W 19-14	2-0	Waco, TX
	Southwestern	W 31-15	3-0	Waco, TX
	Waco YMCA	W 43-10	4-0	Waco, TX
	Texas	W 35-27	5-0	Waco, TX
	Fort Worth YMCA	L 23-46	5-1	Waco, TX
	Fort Worth YMCA	L 20-45	5-2	Waco, TX
	Decatur College	L 13-31	5-3	Waco, TX
	Waco YMCA	L 21-22	5-4	Waco, TX
*Non-conference game. (#) Tournament seedings in parentheses.
