= 1914 Detroit Tigers football team =

American college football season

1914 Detroit Tigers football
- Conference: Independent
- Record: 2–3–2
- Head coach: George M. Lawton (2nd season)
- Home stadium: Mack Park

1914 Midwestern college football independents records
	Conf.			Overall
Team	W	L	T	W		L		T
Western State Normal (MI)		–		6	–	0	–	0
Northern Illinois State		–		7	–	0	–	1
Notre Dame		–		6	–	2	–	0
Michigan Agricultural		–		5	–	2	–	0
Butler		–		4	–	2	–	0
South Dakota		–		5	–	2	–	1
Michigan		–		6	–	3	–	0
North Dakota Agricultural		–		5	–	3	–	0
Haskell		–		5	–	4	–	0
Michigan State Normal		–		3	–	2	–	1
Heidelberg		–		4	–	3	–	1
Akron		–		4	–	4	–	1
Doane		–		3	–	3	–	2
Saint Louis		–		4	–	4	–	0
St. Mary's (OH)		–		2	–	2	–	0
Wabash		–		2	–	2	–	2
Detroit		–		2	–	3	–	2
Lake Forest		–		3	–	5	–	0
Iowa State Teachers		–		2	–	5	–	1
Lincoln (MO)		–		1	–	3	–	0
Marquette		–		2	–	7	–	0
Rose Poly		–		0	–	7	–	0

The 1914 Detroit Tigers football team was an American football team that represented the University of Detroit in the 1914 college football season. In its second season under head coach George M. Lawton, the team compiled a 2–3–2 record and was outscored by its opponents by a combined total of 106 to 27.

== Schedule ==
Date	Opponent	Site	Result	Source
October 3	Assumption (ON)	Detroit, MI	W 20–7	
October 10	Hillsdale	Detroit, MI	T 0–0	
October 17	at Olivet	Olivet, MI	L 0–47	
October 24	Battle Creek Training School	Mack Park; Detroit, MI	L 0–20	
October 31	at Michigan freshmen	Ann Arbor, MI	L 0–32	
November 14	Heidelberg	Detroit, MI	T 0–0	
November 26	Ohio Northern	Mack Park; Detroit, MI	W 7–0	
