= 1914 Michigan State Normal Normalites football team =

American college football season

1914 Michigan State Normal Normalites football
- Conference: Independent
- Record: 3–2–1
- Head coach: Thomas Ransom (1st season)
- Captain: William A. Kishigo

1914 Midwestern college football independents records
	Conf.			Overall
Team	W	L	T	W		L		T
Western State Normal (MI)		–		6	–	0	–	0
Northern Illinois State		–		7	–	0	–	1
Notre Dame		–		6	–	2	–	0
Michigan Agricultural		–		5	–	2	–	0
Butler		–		4	–	2	–	0
South Dakota		–		5	–	2	–	1
Michigan		–		6	–	3	–	0
North Dakota Agricultural		–		5	–	3	–	0
Haskell		–		5	–	4	–	0
Michigan State Normal		–		3	–	2	–	1
Heidelberg		–		4	–	3	–	1
Akron		–		4	–	4	–	1
Doane		–		3	–	3	–	2
Saint Louis		–		4	–	4	–	0
St. Mary's (OH)		–		2	–	2	–	0
Wabash		–		2	–	2	–	2
Detroit		–		2	–	3	–	2
Lake Forest		–		3	–	5	–	0
Iowa State Teachers		–		2	–	5	–	1
Lincoln (MO)		–		1	–	3	–	0
Marquette		–		2	–	7	–	0
Rose Poly		–		0	–	7	–	0

The 1914 Michigan State Normal Normalites football team was an American football team that represented Michigan State Normal College (later renamed Eastern Michigan University) as an independent during the 1914 college football season. In their first and only season under head coach Thomas Ransom, the Normalites compiled a 3–2–1 record and outscored opponents by a total of 72 to 46. Fullback William A. Kishigo, an Ottawa Indian, was the team captain, but he was injured in the third game of the season, sustaining two broken ribs and a fractured shoulder.

== Schedule ==
Date	Time	Opponent	Site	Result	Attendance	Source
October 10		at Michigan freshmen	Ann Arbor, MI	L 0–7		
October 16		at Alma	Davis Field; Alma, MI	T 0–0		
October 31		Assumption (ON)	Ypsilanti, MI	W 31–7		
November 4		Polish Seminary	Ypsilanti, MI	W 27–12		
November 13	2:30 p.m.	Western State Normal	Ypsilanti, MI	L 0–10	2,000	
November 21		Hillsdale	Ypsilanti, MI	W 13–7		
