= 1911–12 Baylor Bears basketball team =

American college basketball season

1911–12 Baylor Bears men's basketball
- Conference: Independent
- Record: 13-0 (13-0 Independent)
- Head coach: Ralph Glaze

The 1911-12 Baylor Bears basketball team represented the Baylor University during the 1911-12 college men's basketball season.

== Schedule ==
Date time, TV	Opponent	Result	Record	Site city, state
	TCU	W 37-18	1-0	Waco, TX
	TCU	W 36-22	2-0	Waco, TX
	at Texas	W 31-28	3-0	Austin, TX
	Texas	W 34-27	4-0	Waco, TX
	Southwest Texas State	W 36-18	5-0	Waco, TX
	Southwest Texas State	W 28-20	6-0	Waco, TX
	Decatur College	W 26-16	7-0	Waco, TX
	Decatur College	W 32-20	8-0	Waco, TX
	Waco YMCA	W 37-14	9-0	Waco, TX
	Fort Worth YMCA	W 36-20	10-0	Waco, TX
	Poly College	W 52-23	11-0	Waco, TX
	Poly College	W 28-24	12-0	Waco, TX
	Waco YMCA	W 32-20	13-0	Waco, TX
*Non-conference game. (#) Tournament seedings in parentheses.
