= 1914 South Dakota Coyotes football team =

American college football season

1914 South Dakota Coyotes football
- Conference: Independent
- Record: 5–2–1
- Head coach: Ion Cortright (1st season)

1914 Midwestern college football independents records
	Conf.			Overall
Team	W	L	T	W		L		T
Western State Normal (MI)		–		6	–	0	–	0
Northern Illinois State		–		7	–	0	–	1
Notre Dame		–		6	–	2	–	0
Michigan Agricultural		–		5	–	2	–	0
Butler		–		4	–	2	–	0
South Dakota		–		5	–	2	–	1
Michigan		–		6	–	3	–	0
North Dakota Agricultural		–		5	–	3	–	0
Haskell		–		5	–	4	–	0
Michigan State Normal		–		3	–	2	–	1
Heidelberg		–		4	–	3	–	1
Akron		–		4	–	4	–	1
Doane		–		3	–	3	–	2
Saint Louis		–		4	–	4	–	0
St. Mary's (OH)		–		2	–	2	–	0
Wabash		–		2	–	2	–	2
Detroit		–		2	–	3	–	2
Lake Forest		–		3	–	5	–	0
Iowa State Teachers		–		2	–	5	–	1
Lincoln (MO)		–		1	–	3	–	0
Marquette		–		2	–	7	–	0
Rose Poly		–		0	–	7	–	0

The 1914 South Dakota Coyotes football team represented the University of South Dakota during the 1914 college football season. In Ion Cortright's first year as head coach, the Coyotes compiled a 5–2–1 record, and outscored their opponents 111 to 75. The Coyotes played a tough schedule, with regional powerhouses Nebraska, Notre Dame, and Minnesota. South Dakota did not win any of these contests, but they did break a 14 game winning streak when they tied Nebraska 0–0 at Lincoln, and would become the Cornhuskers only blemish in a 34 game stretch from 1912 to 1916.

== Schedule ==
Date	Opponent	Site	Result	Attendance	Source
October 3	South Dakota State	Brookings, SD (rivalry)	W 12–0		
October 10	Nebraska	Nebraska Field; Lincoln, NE	T 0–0		
October 17	Minnesota	Northrop Field; Minneapolis, MN	L 7–29	3,000	
October 24	vs. Notre Dame	Sioux Falls, SD	L 0–33	4,000	
October 31	North Dakota	Grand Forks, ND (rivalry)	W 30–3		
November 14	Morningside	Sioux City, IA	W 20–0		
	Yankton		W 33–3		
November 26	Creighton	Vermillion, SD	W 9–7		
