= 1914 USC Trojans football team =

American college football season

1914 USC Trojans football
- Conference: Independent
- Record: 4–3
- Head coach: Ralph Glaze (1st season)
- Captain: Tommy Davis
- Home stadium: Bovard Field

1914 Western college football independents records
	Conf.			Overall
Team	W	L	T	W		L		T
Cheney Normal		–		2	–	0	–	0
Montana		–		7	–	0	–	1
Arizona		–		5	–	1	–	0
Montana A&M		–		5	–	1	–	0
New Mexico		–		3	–	1	–	1
New Mexico A&M		–		4	–	2	–	1
Tempe Normal		–		4	–	3	–	0
USC		–		4	–	3	–	0

The 1914 USC Trojans football team represented the University of Southern California (USC) in the 1914 college football season. In their first year under head coach Ralph Glaze, and following a three-year hiatus in the football program, the Trojans compiled a 4–3 record and outscored their opponents by a combined total of 116 to 88. The season featured USC's first game outside California and second game against future members of the Pacific Coast Conference and eventually the Pac-12 Conference (USC had played Stanford in 1905). In that game, played on November 26, 1914, USC lost to Oregon Agricultural (later Oregon State) by a 38 to 6 score.

== Schedule ==
Date	Time	Opponent	Site	Result	Attendance	Source
September 26	3:00 p.m.	Los Angeles Athletic Club	Bovard Field; Los Angeles, CA	W 20–0		
October 10		Redlands	Bovard Field; Los Angeles, CA	W 41–0		
October 24		Whittier	Los Angeles, CA	W 17–14	1,200	
October 31		Occidental	Los Angeles, CA	L 13–20		
November 7		at Redlands	Redlands, CA	W 13–6		
November 14		at Pomona	Pomona, CA	L 6–10	6,000	
November 26		vs. Oregon Agricultural	Tacoma Stadium; Tacoma, WA	L 6–38	7,000	
