= 1914 Cheney Normal football team =

American college football season

1914 Cheney Normal football
- Conference: Independent
- Record: 2–0
- Head coach: Albert Fertsch (2nd season)

1914 Western college football independents records
	Conf.			Overall
Team	W	L	T	W		L		T
Cheney Normal		–		2	–	0	–	0
Montana		–		7	–	0	–	1
Arizona		–		5	–	1	–	0
Montana A&M		–		5	–	1	–	0
New Mexico		–		3	–	1	–	1
New Mexico A&M		–		4	–	2	–	1
Tempe Normal		–		4	–	3	–	0
USC		–		4	–	3	–	0

The 1914 Cheney Normal football team represented the State Normal School at Cheney—now known as Eastern Washington University—as an independent during the 1914 college football season. Led by second-year head coach Albert Fertsch, Cheney Normal compiled a record of 2–0.

== Schedule ==
Date	Opponent	Site	Result	Source
October 15	vs. Cheyney Normal juniors	Cheney, WA	W 14–7	
November 24	Spokane College	Cheney, WA	W 114–0	
