= 1914 Arizona Wildcats football team =

American college football season

1914 Arizona Wildcats football
- Conference: Independent
- Record: 5–1
- Head coach: Pop McKale (1st season)
- Captain: Turner Church Smith

1914 Western college football independents records
	Conf.			Overall
Team	W	L	T	W		L		T
Cheney Normal		–		2	–	0	–	0
Montana		–		7	–	0	–	1
Arizona		–		5	–	1	–	0
Montana A&M		–		5	–	1	–	0
New Mexico		–		3	–	1	–	1
New Mexico A&M		–		4	–	2	–	1
Tempe Normal		–		4	–	3	–	0
USC		–		4	–	3	–	0

The 1914 Arizona Wildcats football team was an American football team that represented the University of Arizona as an independent during the 1914 college football season. In their first season under head coach Pop McKale, the team compiled a 4–1 record, shut out four of six opponents, and outscored all opponents by a total of 85 to 20. The team captain was Turner Church Smith.

Following a game against Occidental College in Los Angeles, a story in the Los Angeles Times noted: "The Arizona men showed the fight of wild cats . . ." In response to the Timesstory, the Arizona student body adopted the "Wildcats" as the team's nickname.

The season included the resumption of the Arizona–Arizona State football rivalry after a hiatus of 12 years. The Wildcats won the game by a score of 34 to 0.

== Schedule ==
Date	Opponent	Site	Result	Source
October 10	Douglas YMCA	University field; Tucson, AZ	W 21–0	
October 17	Tucson High School	Tucson, AZ	W 13–0	
October 31	Tempe Normal	University field; Tucson, AZ (rivalry)	W 34–0	
November 7	at Occidental	Old Occidental Field; Los Angeles, CA	L 0–14	
November 14	New Mexico A&M	University field; Tucson, AZ	W 10–0	
November 26	Pomona	University field; Tucson, AZ	W 7–6	
