= James Raynsford =

American football player (1891–1956)

Michigan Wolverines
- Position: Center

Personal information
- Born: June 16, 1891; Jersey City, New Jersey, U.S.
- Died: January 18, 1956 (aged 64); Oneida, New York, U.S.

Career information
- College: Michigan (1912–1915)

Awards and highlights
- E. A. Batchelor All-Star Team (1914); Outing magazine Football Roll of Honor (1914)

James Willard Raynsford (June 16, 1891 – January 18, 1956) was an American college football player. He played for the University of Michigan from 1912 to 1914 and was captain of the 1914 Michigan Wolverines football team.

== Early life ==
Raynsford was born in Jersey City, New Jersey, in 1891. By 1910, he had moved with his family to Detroit.

== University of Michigan ==
Raynsford enrolled at the University of Michigan in 1911. He played on the freshman football team in 1911. He played for the University of Michigan Wolverines football team from 1912 to 1914. He played as a tackle in 1912, an end in 1913, and a center in 1914.

In November 1913, Raynsford was elected as the captain of the 1914 Michigan Wolverines football team. He defeated Tommy Hughitt for the honor by a 10 to 9 vote. Hughitt's loss to Raynsford triggered allegations of "rotten politics" and reportedly angered coach Fielding H. Yost. Raynsford nevertheless assumed the captaincy of the 1914 team.

Raynsford started all nine games at center for the 1914 Michigan team that compiled a 6–3 record and outscored its opponents 233 to 68. At the end of the 1914 season, sports writer E. A. Batchelor picked Raynsford as the center on his all-star football team, one of only two Michigan players to be included on the team. He was also named to Outing magazine's 1914 Football Roll of Honor, and was selected by Howard Pearson of the Detroit Journal as the center on his 1914 All-Western college football team. He was Walter Eckersall's second team pick for the 1914 All-Western team.

After graduating from Michigan, Raynsford served as an assistant coach on the 1915 Michigan Wolverines football team.

== Later life ==
In June 1917, he was city engineer in Highland Park, Michigan. He married Anita M. Kelly on December 1, 1918. In 1920, he lived in Oneida, New York with his wife Anita, and was working as a civil engineer. In 1930 and 1940, he was living in Oneida with his wife Anita and a son, James Willard Raynsford, Jr.; he was working as an engineer for a silverware manufacturing enterprise. He became manager of engineering services for Oneida Ltd. Silversmiths; he was with the company from 1917 until his death. He died January 18, 1956, at Oneida, New York.
