= 1914 Tempe Normal Owls football team =

American college football season

1914 Tempe Normal Owls football
- Conference: Independent
- Record: 4–3
- Head coach: George Schaeffer (1st season)
- Home stadium: Normal Field

1914 Western college football independents records
	Conf.			Overall
Team	W	L	T	W		L		T
Cheney Normal		–		2	–	0	–	0
Montana		–		7	–	0	–	1
Arizona		–		5	–	1	–	0
Montana A&M		–		5	–	1	–	0
New Mexico		–		3	–	1	–	1
New Mexico A&M		–		4	–	2	–	1
Tempe Normal		–		4	–	3	–	0
USC		–		4	–	3	–	0

The 1914 Tempe Normal Owls football team was an American football team that represented Tempe Normal School (later renamed Arizona State University) as an independent during the 1914 college football season. In their first season under head coach George Schaeffer, the Owls compiled a 4–3 record and were outscored by their opponents by a combined total of 143 to 97. The team's games included a 34–0 loss in the Arizona–Arizona State football rivalry. Gordon Johnston was the team captain.

== Schedule ==
Date	Opponent	Site	Result
	Tempe High School	Normal Field; Tempe, AZ	W 12–6
	Glendale High School	Normal Field; Tempe, AZ	W 72–0
October 31	at Arizona	University Field; Tucson, AZ (rivalry)	L 0–34
	at Phoenix High School	Phoenix, AZ	L 9–13
	Phoenix Indian School	Normal Field; Tempe, AZ	L 6–24
	Phoenix Indian School	Normal Field; Tempe, AZ	W 34–7
	at Prescott High School	Prescott, AZ	W 10–7
