= 1914 Montana Grizzlies football team =

American college football season

1914 Montana Grizzlies football
- Conference: Independent
- Record: 7–0–1
- Head coach: A. George Heilman (2nd season)
- Home stadium: Dornblaser Field

1914 Western college football independents records
	Conf.			Overall
Team	W	L	T	W		L		T
Cheney Normal		–		2	–	0	–	0
Montana		–		7	–	0	–	1
Arizona		–		5	–	1	–	0
Montana A&M		–		5	–	1	–	0
New Mexico		–		3	–	1	–	1
New Mexico A&M		–		4	–	2	–	1
Tempe Normal		–		4	–	3	–	0
USC		–		4	–	3	–	0

The 1914 Montana Grizzlies football team represented the University of Montana in the 1914 college football season. They were led by second-year head coach A. George Heilman, played their home games at Dornblaser Field and finished the season with a record of seven wins, zero losses and one tie (7–0–1).

== Schedule ==
Date	Opponent	Site	Result	Source
October 3	Butte Ramblers	Dornblaser Field; Missoula, MT	W 87–0	
October 6	Washington State	Dornblaser Field; Missoula, MT	W 10–0	
October 17	at Idaho	MacLean Field; Moscow, ID (rivalry)	T 0–0	
October 30	Utah Agricultural	Dornblaser Field; Missoula, MT	W 32–0	
November 6	Montana A&M	Dornblaser Field; Missoula, MT (rivalry)	W 26–9	
November 14	North Dakota Agricultural	Dornblaser Field; Missoula, MT	W 13–0	
November 20	Montana Mines	Dornblaser Field; Missoula, MT	W 14–0	
November 26	at Gonzaga	Recreation Park; Spokane, WA	W 19–0	
