= 1914 New Mexico A&M Aggies football team =

American college football season

1914 New Mexico A&M Aggies football
- Conference: Independent
- Record: 4–2–1
- Head coach: Clarence W. Russell (1st season)

1914 Western college football independents records
	Conf.			Overall
Team	W	L	T	W		L		T
Cheney Normal		–		2	–	0	–	0
Montana		–		7	–	0	–	1
Arizona		–		5	–	1	–	0
Montana A&M		–		5	–	1	–	0
New Mexico		–		3	–	1	–	1
New Mexico A&M		–		4	–	2	–	1
Tempe Normal		–		4	–	3	–	0
USC		–		4	–	3	–	0

The 1914 New Mexico A&M Aggies football team was an American football team that represented New Mexico College of Agriculture and Mechanical Arts (now known as New Mexico State University) during the 1914 college football season. In their first year under head coach Clarence W. Russell, the Aggies compiled a 4–2–1 record, and outscored all opponents by a total of 80 to 29.

== Schedule ==
Date	Opponent	Site	Result	Source
September 26	at El Paso High School	El Paso, TX	L 0–6	
October 3	El Paso High School	Las Cruces Fair Grounds; Las Cruces, NM	W 17–0	
October 17	at El Paso YMCA	Washington Park; El Paso, TX	W 5–0	
October 31	Texas Mines	Las Cruces, NM (rivalry)	W 19–0	
November 7	New Mexico Military	Las Cruces, NM	W 32–6	
November 14	at Arizona	University Field; Tucson, AZ	L 0–10	
November 26	at New Mexico	Hopewell Field; Albuquerque, NM (rivalry)	T 7–7	
