= 1914 Montana A&M football team =

American college football season

1914 Montana A&M football
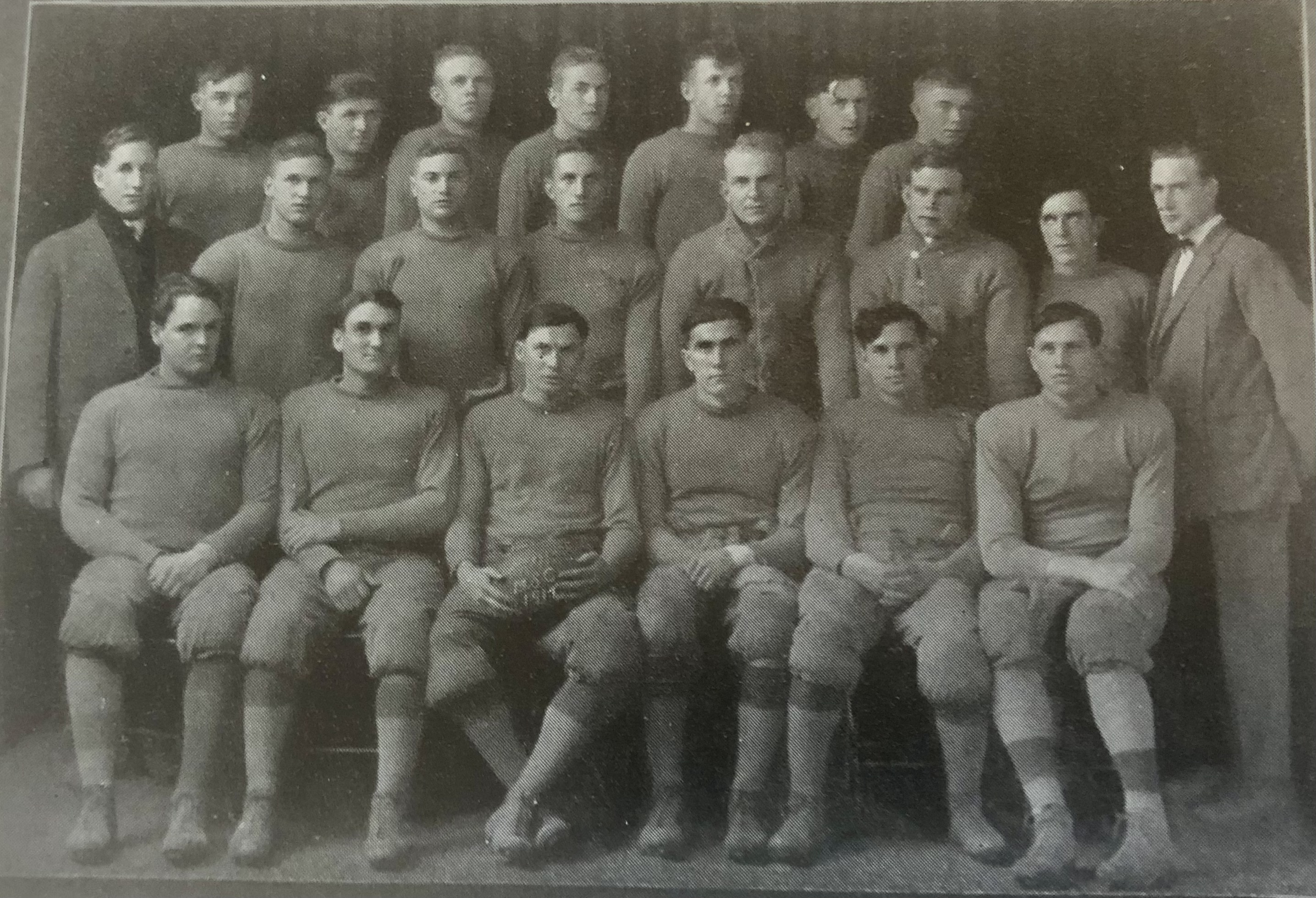
- Conference: Independent
- Record: 5–1
- Head coach: Fred Bennion (1st season)
- Captain: Edward Noble

1914 Western college football independents records
	Conf.			Overall
Team	W	L	T	W		L		T
Cheney Normal		–		2	–	0	–	0
Montana		–		7	–	0	–	1
Arizona		–		5	–	1	–	0
Montana A&M		–		5	–	1	–	0
New Mexico		–		3	–	1	–	1
New Mexico A&M		–		4	–	2	–	1
Tempe Normal		–		4	–	3	–	0
USC		–		4	–	3	–	0

The 1914 Montana A&M football team was an American football team that represented the Montana College of Agriculture and Mechanic Arts (later renamed Montana State University) during the 1914 college football season. In its first season under head coach Fred Bennion, the team compiled a 5–1 record and outscored opponents by a total of 168 to 29. Edward Noble was the team captain. The team's quarterback was G. Ott Romney who later served as Montana State's head football coach from 1922 to 1927.

== Schedule ==
Date	Opponent	Site	Result	Source
October 3	at Billings High School	South Park; Billings, MT	W 21–0	
October 10	Montana Mines	Fairgrounds; Bozeman, MT	W 42–0	
October 17	at Utah Agricultural	Adams Field; Logan, UT	W 53–3	
October 24	at Montana Mines	Columbia Gardens; Butte, MT	W 26–0	
November 6	at Montana	Dornblaser Field; Missoula, MT (rivalry)	L 9–26	
November 18	North Dakota Agricultural	Fairgrounds; Bozeman, MT	W 18–0	

== Players ==
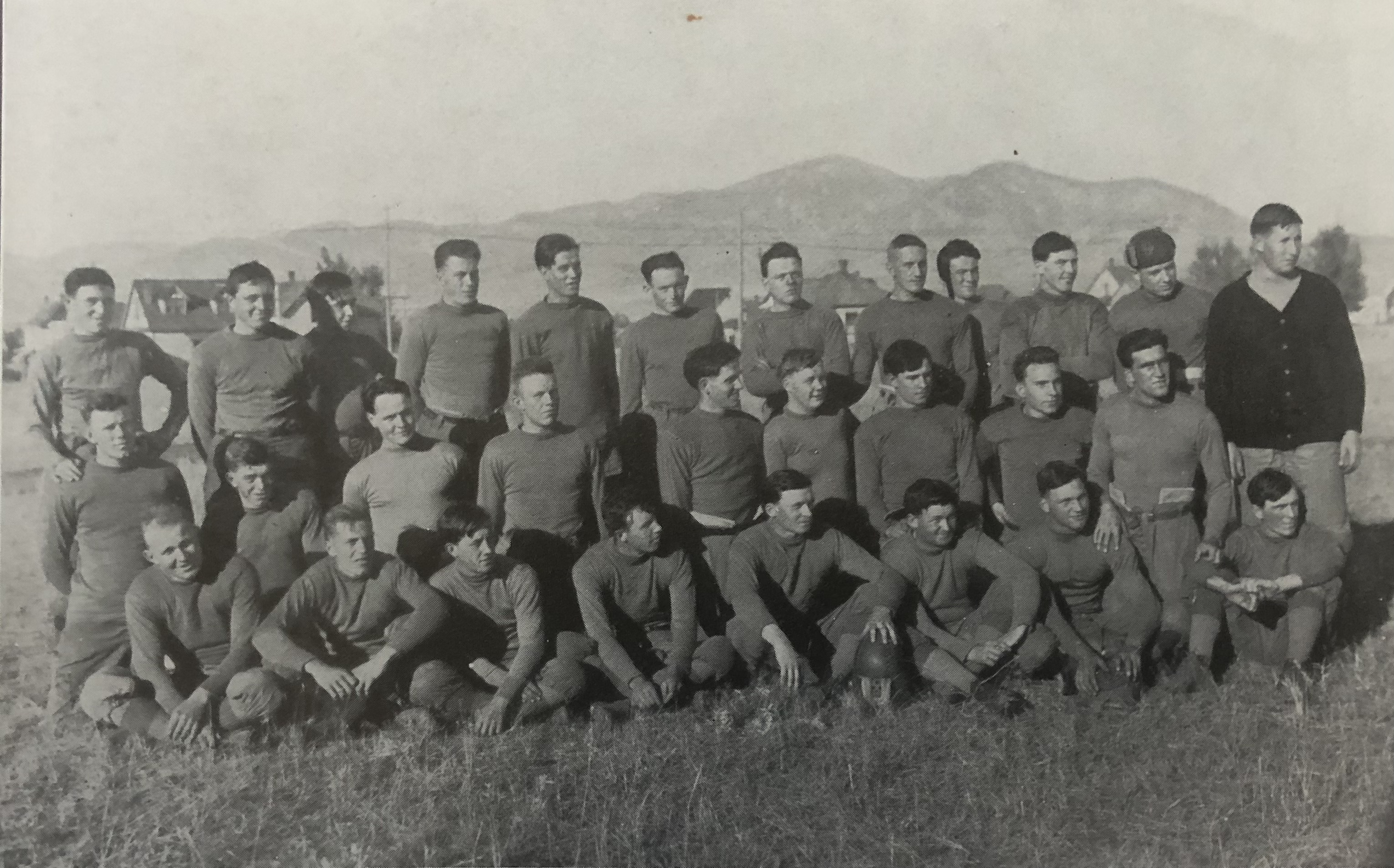
Outdoor portrait of 1914 team

- Eugene Callaghan - end
- Myron Carr - end
- A. Christensen - tackle
- Judson Covert - halfback
- Jay Duquette - guard
- John Garvin - guard
- Cyrus Gatton - fullback
- Walter W. Grimes - quarterback
- Hodson - guard
- Albion Johnson - guard
- Lewis Jolley - end
- George R. Milburn - halfback
- Edward G. Noble - center
- Albert Osenbrug - end
- G. Ott Romney - quarterback
- Joseph Roubideaux - halfback
- Radford Taylor - tackle and captain
- C. Alonzo Truitt - tackle
