= 1914 University of New Mexico football team =

American college football season

1914 University of New Mexico football
- Conference: Independent
- Record: 3–1–1
- Head coach: Ralph Hutchinson (4th season)
- Home stadium: Hopewell Field

1914 Western college football independents records
	Conf.			Overall
Team	W	L	T	W		L		T
Cheney Normal		–		2	–	0	–	0
Montana		–		7	–	0	–	1
Arizona		–		5	–	1	–	0
Montana A&M		–		5	–	1	–	0
New Mexico		–		3	–	1	–	1
New Mexico A&M		–		4	–	2	–	1
Tempe Normal		–		4	–	3	–	0
USC		–		4	–	3	–	0

The 1914 University of New Mexico football team was an American football team that represented the University of New Mexico as an independent during the 1914 college football season. In its fourth season under head coach Ralph Hutchinson (who was also the university's first athletic director), the team compiled a 3–1–1 record and outscored opponents by a total of 77 to 33. Halfback Fred "Fritz" Calkins was the team captain.

The team secured four spots on the 1914 All-New Mexico football team selected by the Albuquerque Morning Journal with input from the coaches of the University of New Mexico, New Mexico A&M and the New Mexico Military Institute. The honorees were "Swifty" Shields at right end; Chet Lee at right guard; Greenfield at left guard; and "Fritz" Calkins at left halfback. Calkins was also named captain of the all-state team.

== Schedule ==
Date	Opponent	Site	Result	Source
October 26	at New Mexico Military	Roswell, NM	L 3–12	
October 31	Albuquerque Indian School	Hopewell Field; Albuquerque, NM	W 40–0	
November 10	New Mexico Military Institute	Hopewell Field; Albuquerque, NM	W 9–7	
November 14	Albuquerque Indian School	Hopewell Field; Albuquerque, NM	W 18–7	
November 26	New Mexico A&M	Hopewell Field; Albuquerque, NM (rivalry)	T 7–7	
