= Lewis Reimann =

American author and politician (1890–1961)

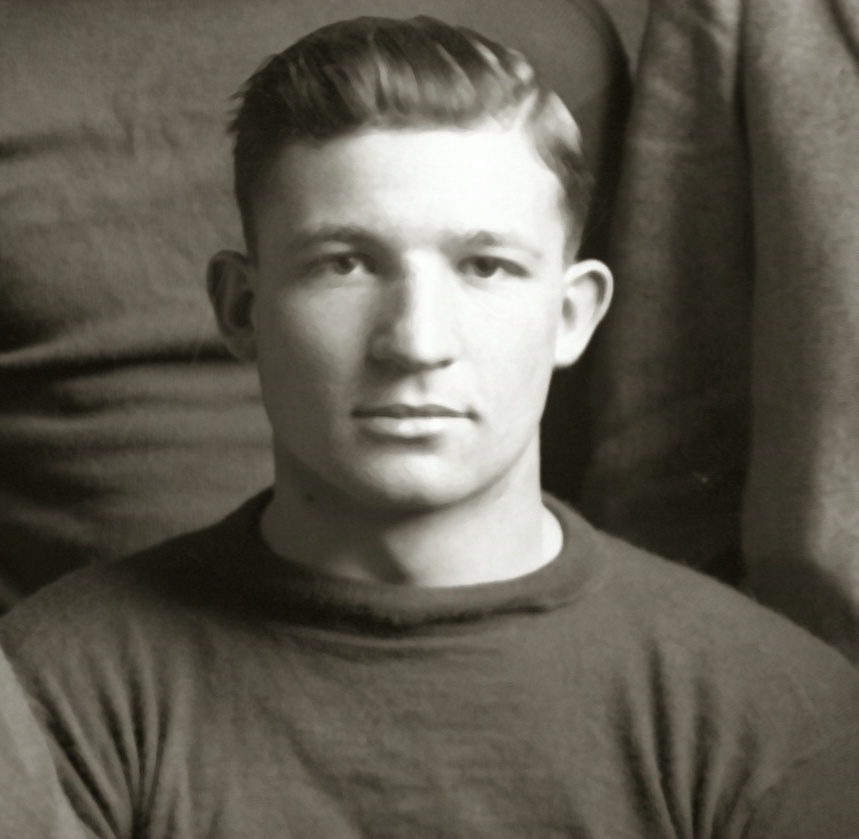
- Lewis Reimann, 1914

Profile
- Position: Tackle

Personal information
- Born: September 22, 1890; Stambaugh, Michigan
- Died: August 20, 1961 (aged 70); Ann Arbor, Michigan

Career information
- High school: Iron River High School
- College: Michigan

Career history
- 1914–1915: Michigan

Lewis Charles Reimann (1890 – August 20, 1961) was an American author, camp operator, politician and football player. A native of the Upper Peninsula of Michigan, Reimann played college football for the Michigan Wolverines in 1914 and 1915. He founded the University of Michigan Fresh Air Camp for underprivileged boys in 1921. Six years later, in 1927, he founded Camp Charlevoix which he operated until 1948. In the 1950s, Reimann wrote several books on the history of the Upper Peninsula and the Menominee and Gogebic Ranges. He also ran unsuccessfully as a Democratic Party candidate for the mayor of Ann Arbor, Michigan in 1951, and for a seat in the Michigan State Senate in 1954.

== Early life ==
Reimann was born in Michigan's Upper Peninsula in 1890. A descendant of German immigrants, he grew up surrounded by the lumber and mining booms in the Iron River district, and played football at Iron River High School.

== University of Michigan ==

Reimann subsequently enrolled at the University of Michigan where he was a lineman on Fielding H. Yost's Michigan Wolverines football teams in 1914 and 1915. In Michigan's 1914 victory over Harvard, Reimann made more tackles than the rest of the Michigan team. He was selected as a second-team All-America at the conclusion of the 1914 season. In 1915, Reimann also won the Michigan and Big Ten Conference heavyweight wrestling championship. An injury limited his playing time during the 1915 college football season; he appeared only briefly in one game.

While attending Michigan, Reimann also became a leader in the "clean athletic movement". Reimann was an outspoken advocate of banning alcohol from college campuses and in 1916 published an article in the YMCA publication Association Men on the topic of alcohol and athletics. He noted the prevalence of alcohol on Michigan's campus:

It was customary after a big victory and when thousands of visitors were in town for the average student to go downtown to celebrate. He got filled with 'spirit,' but not the kind that helped his university's reputation. Scenes were enacted that caused the loyal and serious minded student to hang his head in shame. The visitors were not slow in spreading their impressions of the school.

Reimann was also a member of the Alpha Kappa Lambda fraternity. He later served as the fourth national president of the fraternity, serving in that role from 1925 to 1927.

== Fresh Air Camp and Camp Charlevoix ==
Reimann graduated from the University of Michigan as part of the Literary Class of 1916 and married Pearle Shewell on June 2, 1917, in Genoa, Ohio. At that time, he was employed as the YMCA secretary for Barry County, Michigan. In the late 1910s, he became involved in YMCA camps, the Intercollegiate Prohibition Association, and the Student Christian Association.

In 1921, he founded the University of Michigan Fresh Air Camp for underprivileged boys. The Fresh Air Camp was located on 4,200 feet of wooded lake front 10 miles north of Port Huron, Michigan. It providing recreation and camp activities under the guidance of Michigan students and alumni for boys from poor homes, the juvenile court, and the detention home. In 1921, Reimann described the first Fresh Air Camp in The Michigan Alumnus:

Three sections of ten days each, beginning July 12, were crammed full of happiness for these street urchins, who indulged in swimming hiking, baseball, nature study, campfire stunts, songs and talks. ... Most of the boys returned home heavier, and surely healthier and happier, because Michigan men and women proved themselves unselfish."

One author has described Michigan's Fresh Air Camp and similar programs as "the country's first attempts to conceptualize and intervene in the lives of 'at risk' youth populations." Reimann served as the chief counselor and camp director; he continued to work with the Fresh Air Camp for four years. Based on his success in running the Fresh Air Camp, friends urged Reimann to develop a private camp.

In 1927, Reimann founded Camp Charlevoix. He first opened the camp in a temporary location in Ironton, Michigan in Charlevoix County. In 1928, he found a site on the shores of Lake Charlevoix. The site had 170 acres and three-quarters of a mile of lake frontage. Reimann personally drew the plans for the camp's 23 buildings. The permanent camp was completed in 1929. Reimann operated Camp Charlevoix for more than 20 years. In 1937, he expanded the facilities with the addition of five new log buildings. Reimann sold Camp Charlevoix in 1948.

Reimann became a consultant for some 150 camps across the United States, worked with the American Camping Association, and founded National Boys and Girls Camp Week. In 1958, the University of Michigan Press published Reimann's book, "The Successful Camp."

== Author ==
Reimann became known as an authority on the history of the Upper Peninsula and Menominee and Gogebic Ranges. His first book, Between the Iron and the Pine: A Biography of a Pioneer Family and a Pioneer Town was published in 1951. Between the Iron and the Pine contains Reimann's personal reminiscences, local folklore, and descriptions of "memorable local characters". With the success of his first book, Reimann wrote several other books on the region's history, including When Pine Was King (1952), Incredible Seney: The First Complete Story of Michigan's Fabulous Lumber Town (1953), Hurley—Still No Angel (1954), and The Game Warden and the Poachers (1959).

== Politics ==
In his later years, Reimann also ran unsuccessfully as a candidate for mayor of Ann Arbor, Michigan in 1951. He ran as a Democrat and was defeated by the incumbent Republican Mayor William E. Brown Jr. He also ran unsuccessfully for a seat in the Michigan State Senate in 1954. He had previously served as a "dry" delegate from Washtenaw County to the 1933 Michigan Constitutional Convention to ratify the Twenty-first Amendment to the United States Constitution repealing Prohibition.

== Family, death and honors ==
In August 1961, Reimann died at his home in Ann Arbor, Michigan, following a long illness at age 70. He was survived by his wife, Pearle, a daughter, Mrs. Lawrence S. Smith, and three grandchildren. He was posthumously inducted into the Upper Peninsula Sports Hall of Fame in 2010.
