= 1914 Michigan Wolverines football team =

American college football season

1914 Michigan Wolverines football
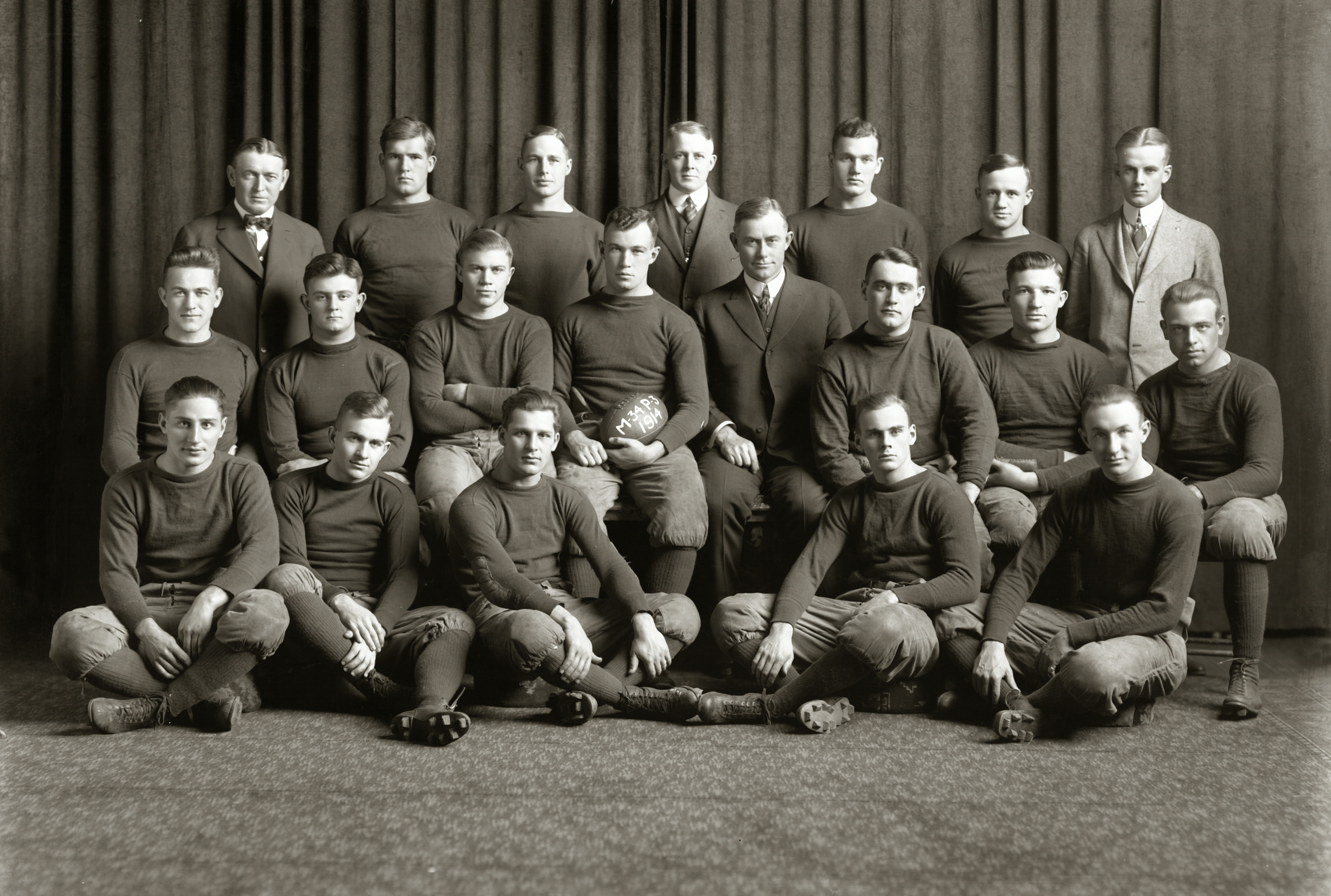
- Conference: Independent
- Record: 6–3
- Head coach: Fielding H. Yost (14th season)
- MVP: Tommy Hughitt
- Captain: James W. Raynsford
- Home stadium: Ferry Field

Uniform
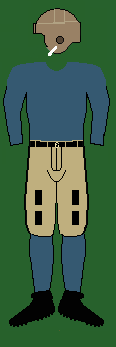

1914 Midwestern college football independents records
	Conf.			Overall
Team	W	L	T	W		L		T
Western State Normal (MI)		–		6	–	0	–	0
Northern Illinois State		–		7	–	0	–	1
Notre Dame		–		6	–	2	–	0
Michigan Agricultural		–		5	–	2	–	0
Butler		–		4	–	2	–	0
South Dakota		–		5	–	2	–	1
Michigan		–		6	–	3	–	0
North Dakota Agricultural		–		5	–	3	–	0
Haskell		–		5	–	4	–	0
Michigan State Normal		–		3	–	2	–	1
Heidelberg		–		4	–	3	–	1
Akron		–		4	–	4	–	1
Doane		–		3	–	3	–	2
Saint Louis		–		4	–	4	–	0
St. Mary's (OH)		–		2	–	2	–	0
Wabash		–		2	–	2	–	2
Detroit		–		2	–	3	–	2
Lake Forest		–		3	–	5	–	0
Iowa State Teachers		–		2	–	5	–	1
Lincoln (MO)		–		1	–	3	–	0
Marquette		–		2	–	7	–	0
Rose Poly		–		0	–	7	–	0

The 1914 Michigan Wolverines football team represented the University of Michigan as an independent during the 1914 college football season. In their 14th season under head coach Fielding H. Yost, the Wolverines won their first five games by a combined score of 180 to 10, including three shutouts. They then lost three of the final four games to finish with a 6–3 record.

Michigan halfback John Maulbetsch was a consensus first-team selection for the 1914 College Football All-America Team. Two other Michigan players, center James Raynsford and quarterback Tommy Hughitt, were named to Outing magazine's Football Roll of Honor. Raynsford was the team captain, and Hughitt was selected as the team's most valuable player.

== Schedule ==
Date	Opponent	Site	Result	Attendance
September 30	DePauw	Ferry Field; Ann Arbor, MI	W 58–0	5,113
October 3	Case	Ferry Field; Ann Arbor, MI	W 69–0	5,049
October 7	Mount Union	Ferry Field; Ann Arbor, MI	W 27–7	5,050
October 10	Vanderbilt	Ferry Field; Ann Arbor, MI	W 23–3	5,282
October 17	at Michigan Agricultural	College Field; East Lansing, MI (rivalry)	W 3–0	8,934
October 24	at Syracuse	Archbold Stadium; Syracuse, NY	L 6–20	6,404
October 31	at Harvard	Harvard Stadium; Boston, MA	L 0–7	23,213
November 7	Penn	Ferry Field; Ann Arbor, MI	W 34–3	21,146
November 14	Cornell^{†}	Ferry Field; Ann Arbor, MI	L 13–28	16,315
^{†}Homecoming

== Game summaries ==
=== Week 1: DePauw ===
Week 1: DePauw at Michigan

Team	1	2	3	4	Total
DePauw	0	0	0	0	0
• Michigan	7	23	21	7	58

- Date: September 30, 1914
- Location: Ferry Field
  Ann Arbor, MI
- Referee: Kennedy (Chicago)

Michigan opened the 1914 season with a 58–0 victory over DePauw. Lawrence Splawn ran for two touchdowns, drop-kicked a field goal from the 27-yard line, and averaged 55 yards on three punts. Quarterback Tommy Hughitt threw touchdown pass to John Lyons, 20 yards in the air with Lyons running another 35 yards for the touchdown. In all, Michigan scored eight touchdowns, two each by Splawn, John Maulbetsch, and Hughitt, and one each by Lyons and Cohn.

=== Week 2: Case ===
Week 2: Case at Michigan

Team	1	2	3	4	Total
Case	0	0	0	0	0
• Michigan	21	20	21	7	69

- Date: October 3, 1914
- Location: Ferry Field
  Ann Arbor, MI
- Referee: Ralph Hoagland (Princeton)

On October 3, 1914, Michigan defeated Case by a 69 to 0 score. The game was played in 10-minute quarters at Ferry Field. Michigan's touchdowns were scored by Lawrence Roehm (2), John Maulbetsch (2), James Catlett (2), Tommy Hughitt (2), and Maurice Dunne. Hughitt also kicked nine points after touchdown.

=== Week 3: Mt. Union ===
Week 3: Mt. Union at Michigan

Team	1	2	3	4	Total
Mt. Union	0	0	0	7	7
• Michigan	10	10	7	0	27

- Date: October 7, 1914
- Location: Ferry Field
  Ann Arbor, MI
- Referee: Kennedy (Chicago)

On Wednesday, October 7, 1914, Michigan defeated Mt. Union 27 to 7. John Maulbetsch scored two touchdowns. Lawrence Splawn scored a touchdown and kicked two field goals.

=== Week 4: Vanderbilt ===
Week 4: Vanderbilt at Michigan

Team	1	2	3	4	Total
Vanderbilt	3	0	0	0	3
• Michigan	7	9	0	7	23

- Date: October 10, 1914
- Location: Ferry Field
  Ann Arbor, MI
- Referee: Bradley Walker

On October 10, 1914, Michigan defeated Vanderbilt 23 to 3 at Ferry Field. Michigan scored on two touchdowns by John Maulbetsch, a touchdown and points after touchdown by Tommy Hughitt, and a field goal by Lawrence Splawn.

=== Week 5: at M. A. C. ===
Week 5: Michigan at M. A. C.

Team	1	2	3	4	Total
• Michigan	0	0	0	3	3
M. A. C.	0	0	0	0	0

- Date: October 17, 1914
- Location: College Field
  East Lansing, MI

On October 17, 1914, Michigan won a close game over Michigan Agricultural College by 3–0 score at College Field in East Lansing. Michigan quarterback Tommy Hughitt sustained a dislocated elbow and was believed at the time to be lost for the remainder of the season. He ended up missing the following week's game against Syracuse but returned for the Harvard game.

=== Week 6: at Syracuse ===
Week 6: Michigan at Syracuse

Team	1	2	3	4	Total
Michigan	0	0	6	0	6
• Syracuse	0	0	6	14	20

- Date: October 24, 1914
- Location: Archbold Stadium
  Syracuse, NY
- Referee: Mike Thompson

After winning its first five games, Michigan lost to Syracuse by a 20 to 6 score on October 24, 1914. After a scoreless first half, each team scored a touchdown in the third quarter, and the fourth quarter began with the score tied at 6 to 6. Syracuse scored two touchdowns in the fourth quarter to win the game. John Maulbetsch accounted for Michigan's scoring with a touchdown and goal from touchdown.

=== Week 7: at Harvard ===
Week 7: Michigan at Harvard

Team	1	2	3	4	Total
Michigan	0	0	0	0	0
• Harvard	0	7	0	0	7

- Date: October 31, 1914
- Location: Harvard Stadium
  Boston, MA
- Referee: W. S. Langford

On October 31, 1914, Michigan lost to the undefeated 1914 Harvard Crimson football team by a 7 to 0 score at Harvard Stadium. Harvard's All-American halfback Huntington Hardwick scored the game's only touchdown on a six-yard run in the second quarter.

=== Week 8: Penn ===
Week 8: Penn at Michigan

Team	1	2	3	4	Total
Penn	3	0	0	0	3
• Michigan	0	23	11	0	34

- Date: November 7, 1914
- Location: Ferry Field
  Ann Arbor, MI
- Referee: Walter Eckersall

On November 7, 1914, Michigan defeated Penn 34 to 3 at Ferry Field. Michigan's five touchdowns were scored by John Maulbetsch (2), Tommy Hughitt, James Catlett, and Leland Benton. Hughitt also kicked four points after touchdown.

=== Week 9: Cornell ===
Week 9: Cornell at Michigan

Team	1	2	3	4	Total
• Cornell	0	6	13	9	28
Michigan	6	7	0	0	13

- Date: November 14, 1914
- Location: Ferry Field
  Ann Arbor, MI
- Referee: Jos. Pendleton (Bowdoin)

On November 14, 1914, Michigan ended its season at home with a loss to Cornell by a 28 to 13 score. Michigan took the lead in the first quarter on a pass from Lawrence Splawn to Karl Staatz. Michigan extended its lead to 13 to 0 in the second quarter on a short touchdown run by John Maulbetsch who also kicked the goal from touchdown. From that point forward, Michigan was unable to score while Cornell scored 28 points. Fullback Carl Phillipi scored three touchdowns for Cornell.

== Roster ==
=== Letter winners ===
Player	Position	Games started	Hometown	Height	Weight	Class
Clyde E. Bastian	Halfback	3	Williamsport, PA	5-10	178	
Leland H. Benton	End	4	Valparaiso, IN	5-11	165	
Thomas H. Bushnell	Halfback; Quarterback	1; 1	East Cleveland, OH			
James Bland Catlett	Halfback		Brookings, SD			
William D. Cochran	Tackle	9	Houghton, MI	5-8	224	
Maurice F. Dunne	End	1	Springfield, IL	6-0	164	
Ernest Hughitt	Quarterback	8	Escanaba, MI	5-8	146	
Efton James	End		Vandalia, MI			
John J. Lyons	End; Halfback	5; 2	Pittsburgh, PA	6-0	180	
John Maulbetsch	Halfback	9	Ann Arbor, MI	5-8	168	
Frank M. McHale	Guard	5	Logansport, IN	5-11	212	
Walter Neimann	Tackle	9	Hermansville, MI			
James Raynsford	Center	9	Detroit, MI	6-0	187	
Lewis Reimann	Tackle		Iron River, MI	5-11	184	
Lawrence Lamar Splawn	Fullback	9	Dallas, TX	5-11	167	
Karl S. Staatz	End	7	Tacoma, WA	6-0	178	
Robert W. Watson	Guard		Ludington, MI	5-9	174	

=== Reserves ===
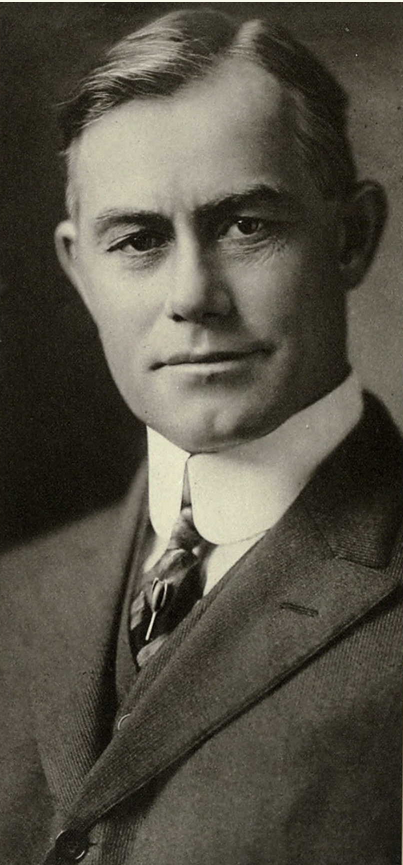
Fielding H. Yost from the 1915 Michiganensian

- Frank Millard - started 1 game at right guard
- Frank D. Quail - started 3 games at left guard
- Fred Rehor - started 1 game at left guard
- Lawrence Roehm - started 3 games at right halfback
- William Watson - started 3 games at left guard and 3 games at right guard
- Jim Whalen - started 2 games at right guard, 1 game at right end

== Awards and honors ==
- Captain: James W. Raynsford
- All-Americans: John Maulbetsch
- Heston-Schulz Trophy (team MVP): Tommy Hughitt

== Coaching staff ==
- Head coach: Fielding H. Yost
- Assistant coaches: William Cole (assistant coach), Prentiss Douglass (All-Fresh Coach), Germany Schulz (assistant coach)
- Trainer: Stephen Farrell
- Manager: John S. Leonard

== Gallery ==
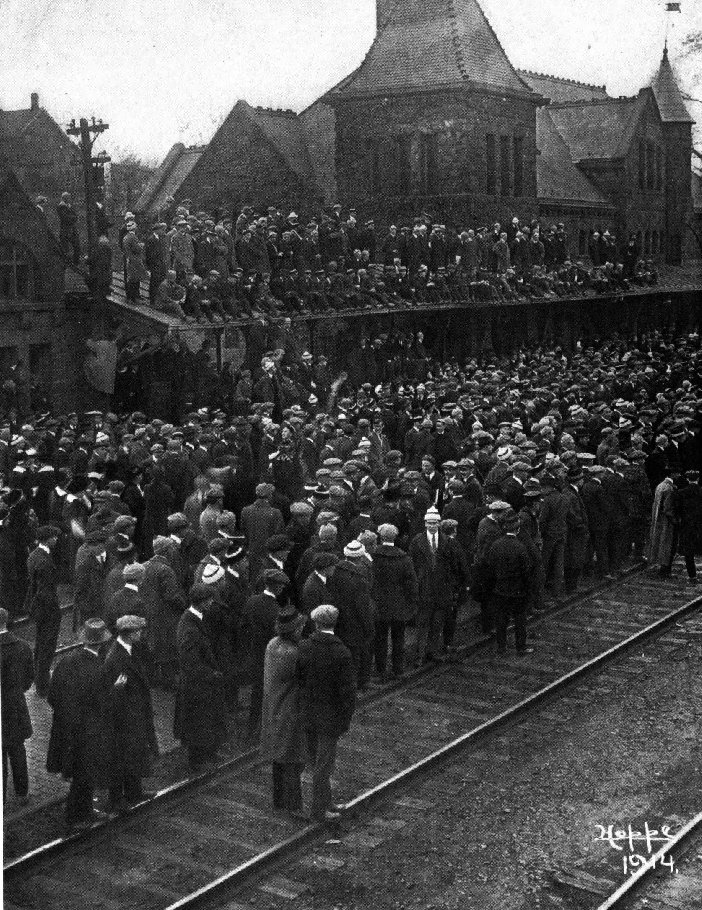
Crowd sending off football team for Harvard game, October 1914

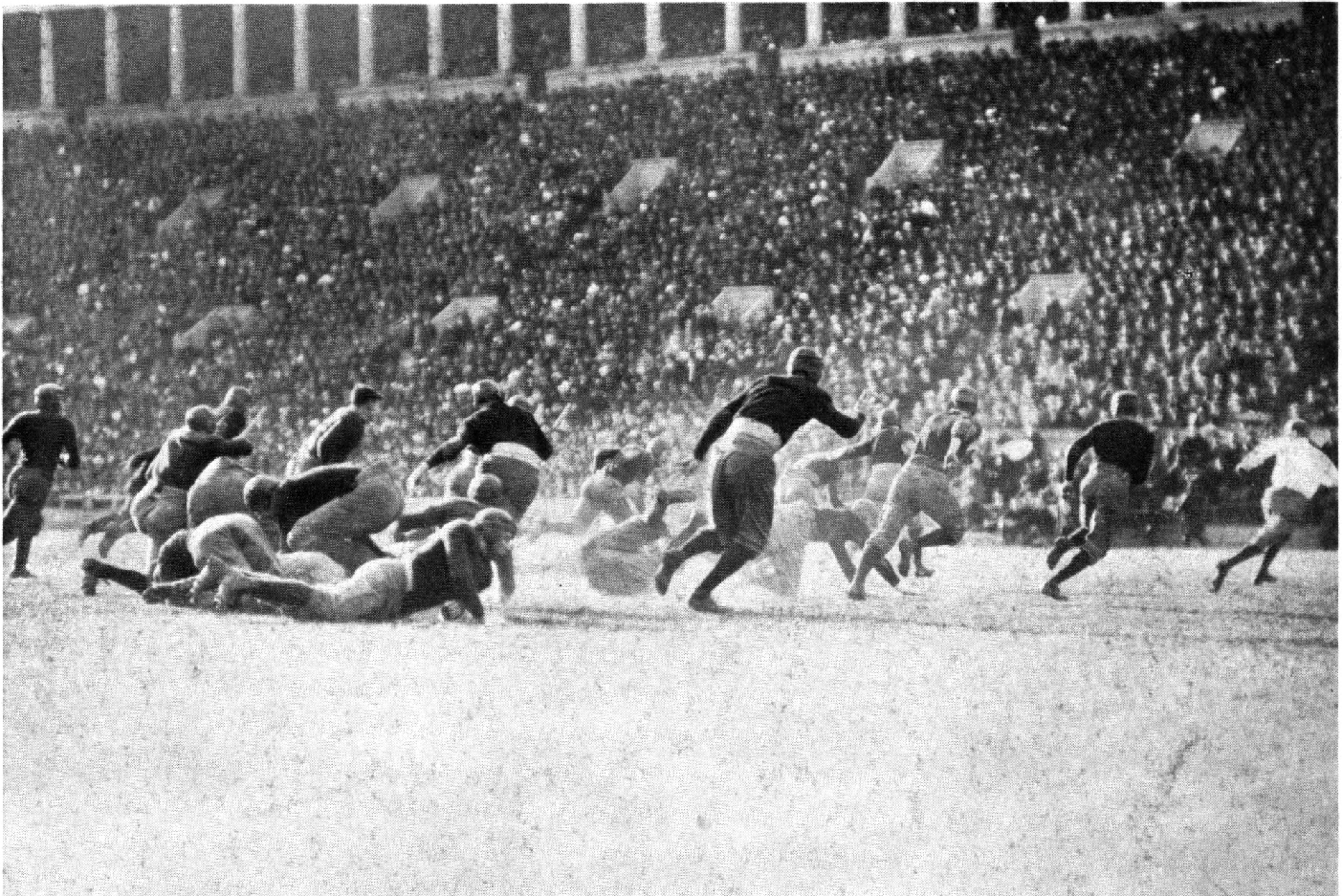
Harvard-Michigan game, October 31, 1914

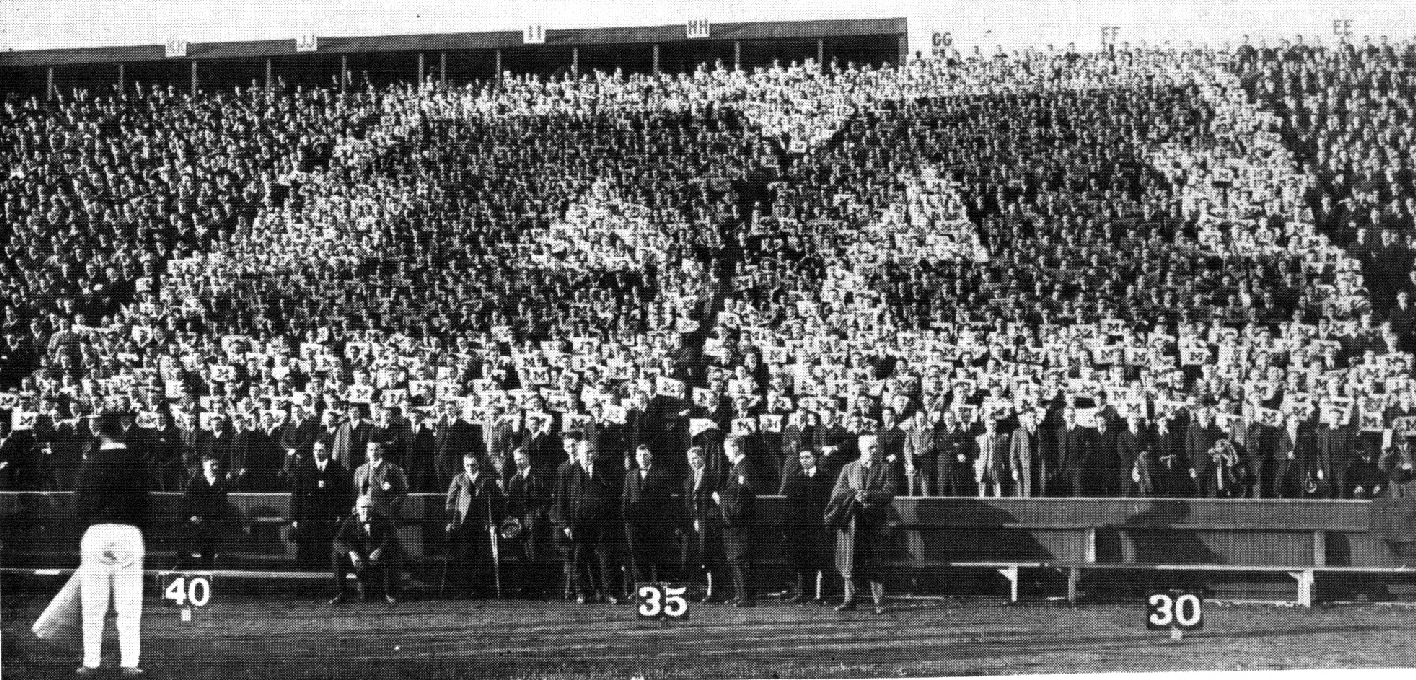
Crowd at Ferry Field in "Block M" display, Nov. 7, 1914

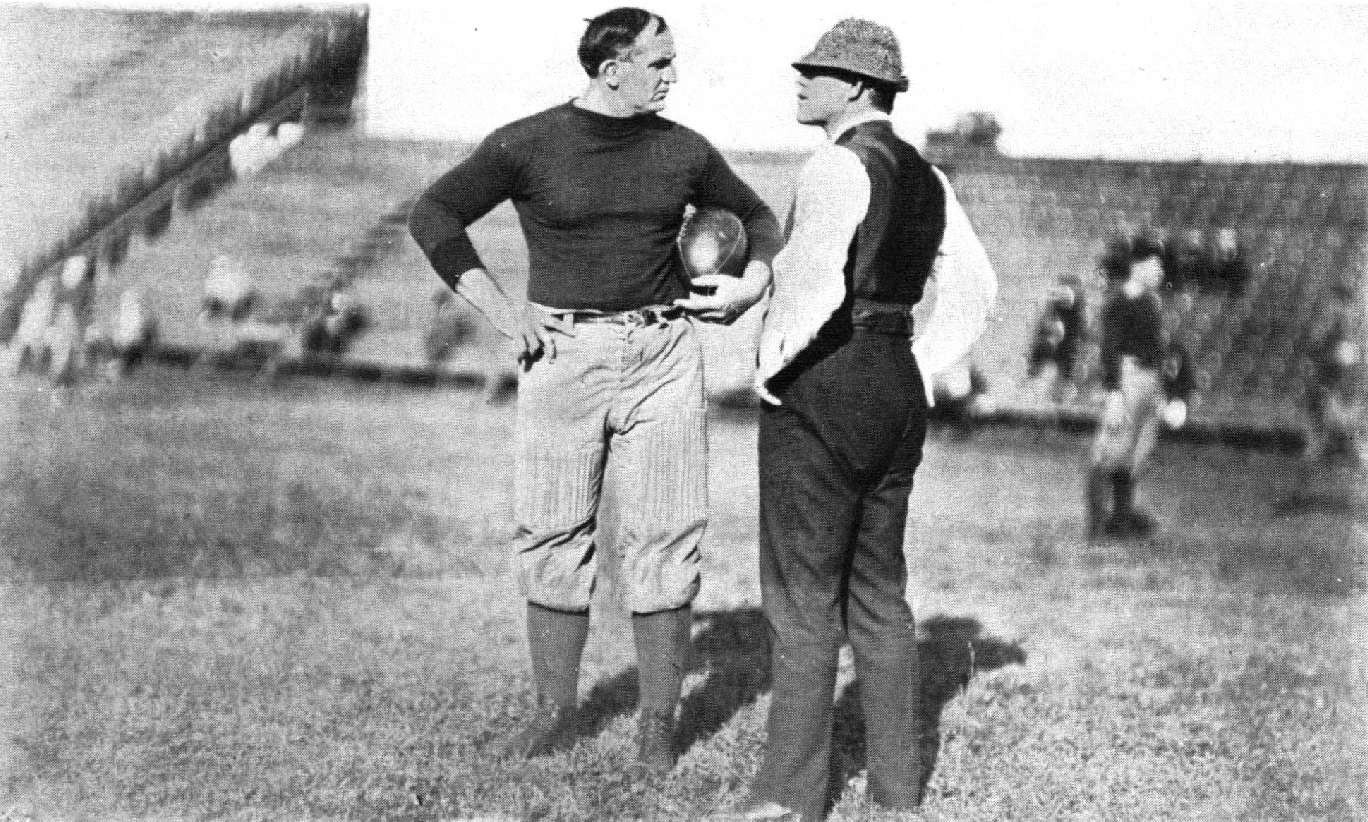
Germany Schulz and Fielding H. Yost, 1914

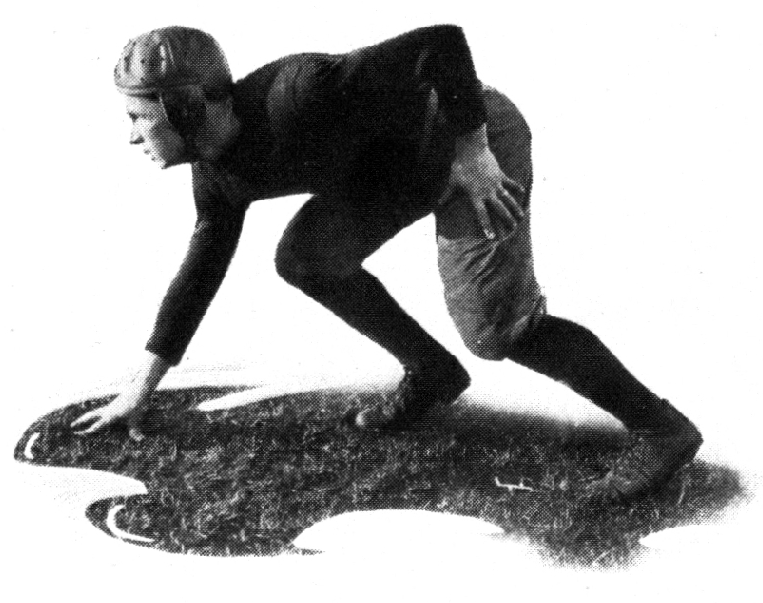
Michigan's lone All-American in 1914, John Maulbetsch
