= Bill Kelleher =

American football player and coach (1888–1961)

Biographical details
- Born: December 13, 1888; Macroom, Ireland
- Died: November 27, 1961 (aged 71); Lorain, Ohio, U.S.

Playing career

Football
- 1911–1914: Notre Dame
- 1915–1916: Massillon Tigers
- 1917: Youngstown Patricians

Basketball
- 1911–1915: Notre Dame
- Positions: Halfback, fullback (football); Guard (basketball)

Coaching career (HC unless noted)

Football
- 1915–1916: Kenyon

Head coaching record
- Overall: 5–13

William Andrew Kelleher (December 13, 1888 – November 27, 1961) was an American football player and coach. He served as head coach at Kenyon College in Gambier, Ohio from 1915 to 1916, compiling a record of 5–13. He played college football at the University of Notre Dame and professionally for the Massillon Tigers and Youngstown Patricians of the Ohio League. Born in Ireland, Kelleher worked for 35 years at Lorain Works, National Tube Division, a part of U.S. Steel. He died on November 27, 1961, at his home in Lorain, Ohio.

== Head coaching record ==
Year	Team	Overall	Conference	Standing	Bowl/playoffs
Kenyon Lords (Ohio Athletic Conference) (1915–1916)
1915	Kenyon	3–6	1–6	T–10th	
1916	Kenyon	2–7	2–5	T–10th	
Kenyon:		5–13	3–11		
Total:		5–13			
