= Kentucky Intercollegiate Athletic Association =

College sports conference in Kentucky, 1907–1916

The Kentucky Intercollegiate Athletic Association (KIAA) was a short-lived intercollegiate athletic football conference that existed from 1907 to 1916. The league had members, as its name suggests, in the state of Kentucky.

== Champions ==
- 1907: Kentucky State College
- 1914: Transylvania
- 1915: Transylvania
- 1916: Centre

== See also ==
- List of defunct college football conferences
- Kentucky Intercollegiate Athletic Conference
