= Ralph Glaze =

American baseball player (1881–1968)

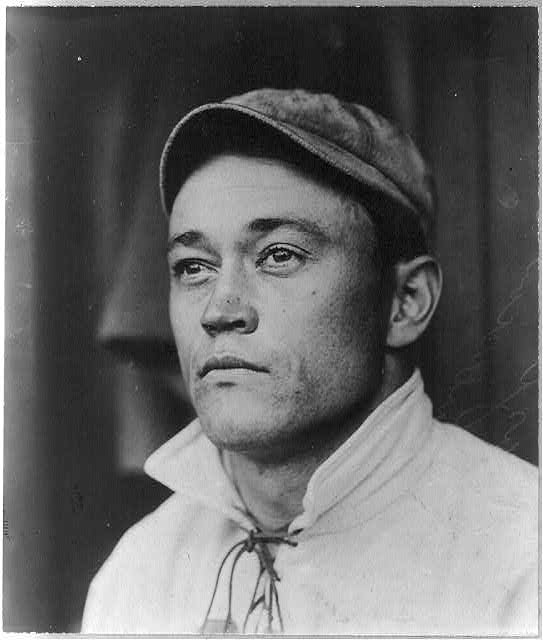
- Glaze in 1908

Biographical details
- Born: March 13, 1881; Denver, Colorado, U.S.
- Died: October 31, 1968 (aged 87); Atascadero, California, U.S.

Playing career

Football
- 1901: Colorado
- 1903–1905: Dartmouth

Baseball
- 1903–1906: Dartmouth
- 1906–1908: Boston Americans / Red Sox
- 1908: Providence Grays
- 1909–1910: Indianapolis Indians
- 1913: Beaumont Oilers
- 1914: Topeka Jayhawks
- Positions: End (football); Pitcher (baseball)

Coaching career (HC unless noted)

Football
- 1908–1909: Rochester (NY)
- 1910–1912: Baylor
- 1914–1915: USC
- 1916: Drake
- 1917–1918: Colorado State Teachers
- 1919–1920: Colorado Mines
- 1921–1923: Lake Forest
- 1924–1925: St. Viator

Basketball
- 1910–1913: Baylor
- 1914–1916: USC
- 1916–1917: Drake
- 1917–1919: Colorado State Teachers
- 1919–1921: Colorado Mines
- 1921–1924: Lake Forest

Baseball
- 1910–1913: Baylor
- 1913: Beaumont Oilers
- 1915: USC
- 1922: Colorado Mines

Track
- 1915: USC

Head coaching record
- Overall: 49–68–15 (college football); 66–90 (college basketball); 67–43 (college baseball)

Accomplishments and honors

Awards
- Consensus All-American (1905); Second-team All-American (1904)

Ralph Glaze
- Pitcher
- Born: March 13, 1881; Denver, Colorado
- Died: October 31, 1968 (aged 87); Atascadero, California
- Batted: Right Threw: Right

MLB debut
- June 1, 1906, for the Boston Americans

Last MLB appearance
- June 15, 1908, for the Boston Red Sox

MLB statistics
- Win–loss record: 15–21
- Earned run average: 2.89
- Strikeouts: 137
- Stats at Baseball Reference

Teams
- Boston Americans/Red Sox (1906–1908)

Daniel Ralph Glaze (March 13, 1881 – October 31, 1968) was an American sportsman and coach who played as a right-handed pitcher in Major League Baseball, and later became a football and baseball coach and administrator at several colleges.

== Early life and playing career ==
Glaze was born in Denver, Colorado, and was recruited by Dartmouth College after displaying his skill in two sports. He played football at the University of Colorado in the 1901 season under coach Fred Folsom, a Dartmouth alumnus who became that school's coach in 1903. Glaze enrolled at Dartmouth in 1902, being followed there by his younger brother, John. Under Folsom, he played a notable role in the school's first-ever football victory over Harvard in 1903, a game in which Harvard dedicated its new stadium. In 1905, Glaze was named an All-American as an end by Walter Camp, even though at 5'8" and 153 pounds he was the smallest player on Dartmouth's team that year. Glaze also played baseball at Dartmouth, and pitched a no-hitter against Columbia.

During summers, Glaze played semi-pro ball in Colorado, using the assumed name "Ralph Pearce" to protect his college eligibility. Among the Colorado teams Glaze played for was the "Big Six" team in Trinidad, where he pitched in 1905. In 1905 he met an opposing catcher named John Tortes, a Native American, and encouraged him to apply to Dartmouth due to the school's charter making specific provisions for the education of Native Americans. As Tortes had dropped out of school, several Dartmouth alumni conspired to create a false background for him, and he enrolled until the ruse was discovered some time after his first semester. Nonetheless, the catcher attracted notice from various baseball figures, and he went on to a 9-year major league career from 1909 to 1917 under the name Chief Meyers; he maintained a strong affinity to Dartmouth, and credited Glaze with his start in the sport.

After graduating in 1906, Glaze signed with the Boston Americans, as the press referred to them in 1906. The team would later be known as the Boston Red Sox. Over three years, Glaze posted a record of 15 wins against 21 losses, with 137 strikeouts and a 2.89 earned run average in 61 games and 340 innings pitched. A career highlight took place on August 31 of his rookie year, when he outdueled Philadelphia Athletics star pitcher Rube Waddell. Glaze began coaching in the offseasons, starting as a 1906 football assistant at Dartmouth; he also helped coach their baseball team in 1908. He left the Red Sox following the 1908 season, and spent the next several years with a number of minor league teams.

== Coaching career ==
In 1910, Glaze became the football coach at Baylor University. His teams had a record of 12–10–3 from 1910 through 1912, including a 6–1-1 mark in his first year. Glaze became the head coach of the University of Southern California's football team for the 1914 and 1915 seasons, compiling a 7–7 record. He was the first coach after USC's teams began to be known as the Trojans. Before his arrival, USC had not played football for the previous three seasons; like many universities at the time, the school had switched to rugby and did not field football teams during the 1911 through 1913 seasons. After competing primarily against southern California teams throughout its history, USC was now beginning to include major colleges from other areas on its schedule. The 1914 season finale at Oregon State was the first against a major college opponent since a 1905 loss at Stanford, and was also USC's first game ever outside of California. The highlight of Glaze's brief tenure occurred the following year with the inauguration of the long-standing series with California. At the time, Cal was considered the traditionally dominant team of West Coast football, and Glaze managed to lead USC to a 28–10 road victory before falling to Cal, 23–21, at home later the same season; however, it was Cal's first year resuming football after having switched to rugby for the previous nine seasons.

Glaze was succeeded in 1916 by Dean Cromwell, who was USC's football coach before the switch to rugby. Glaze also coached the Trojans baseball team, represented by the university's law school, in the 1915 season to a 5–10 record, and guided the USC track team the same spring. He also coached the USC basketball team in 1915–16, with a record of 8–21 against exclusively southern California competition.

Glaze became football coach at Drake University in 1916, with a record of 3–10–2, and then became football coach at Colorado State Teachers College (now the University of Northern Colorado) in 1917–18 as the school resumed football after 11 years, with a record of 2–6. He coached football at the Colorado School of Mines in 1919–20, with a record of 0–10–2. From 1921 to 1924 he coached at Lake Forest College, leading the football team to a 10–12–3 record from 1921 to 1923, and the basketball team to an 11–32 mark from 1921 to 1924.

During his career, Glaze also coached at the University of Rochester, Texas Christian University and St. Viator College.

== Marriage, later life, and death ==
Glaze married Evaline Leavitt in 1907; she died in 1927, the year he retired from coaching to go into business in Denver. In 1930, he became superintendent of the Boston and Maine Railroad's terminal in Charlestown, Massachusetts, and he married Winifred Bonar Demuth the same year. In 1946 the couple retired to California, moving to Cambria, California in 1951. In his later years, Glaze struck up a friendship with former American League outfielder Sam Crawford, who had a cottage several miles away; coincidentally, Crawford had been one of Glaze's successors as USC's baseball coach. Glaze stayed fit, walking three to five miles daily with his dogs when he was in his 80s. He died at age 86 in Atascadero, California.

== Head coaching record ==
=== College football ===
Year	Team	Overall	Conference	Standing	Bowl/playoffs
Rochester Yellowjackets (Independent) (1908–1909)
1908	Rochester	7–1–1			
1909	Rochester	4–3–1			
Rochester:		11–4–2			
Baylor (Independent) (1910–1912)
1910	Baylor	6–1–1			
1911	Baylor	2–4–2			
1912	Baylor	3–5			
Baylor:		11–10–3			
USC Trojans (Independent) (1914–1915)
1914	USC	4–3			
1915	USC	3–4			
USC:		7–7			
Drake Bulldogs (Missouri Valley Intercollegiate Athletic Association) (1916)
1916	Drake	3–5	1–3	6th	
1917	Drake	0–5–2	0–3	7th	
Drake:		3–10–2	1–6		
Colorado State Teachers (Independent) (1917–1918)
1917	Colorado State Teachers	0–5			
1918	Colorado State Teachers	2–1			
Colorado State Teachers:		2–6			
Colorado Mines Orediggers (Rocky Mountain Conference) (1919)
1919	Colorado Mines	0–4–2	0–4–1	T–7th	
1920	Colorado Mines	0–6	0–6	8th	
Colorado Mines:		0–10–2	0–10–1		
Lake Forest Foresters (Illinois Intercollegiate Athletic Conference) (1921–1923)
1921	Lake Forest	4–4			
1922	Lake Forest	3–3–2			
1923	Lake Forest	2–6–1	1–3	T–17th	
Lake Forest:		9–13–3			
St. Viator Irish (Illinois Intercollegiate Athletic Conference) (1924–1925)
1924	St. Viator	1–5–2	1–2	T–16th	
1925	St. Viator	5–3–1	3–2	T–7th	
St. Viator:		6–8–3	4–4		
Total:		49–68–15			
