= 1914 college football season =

American college football season

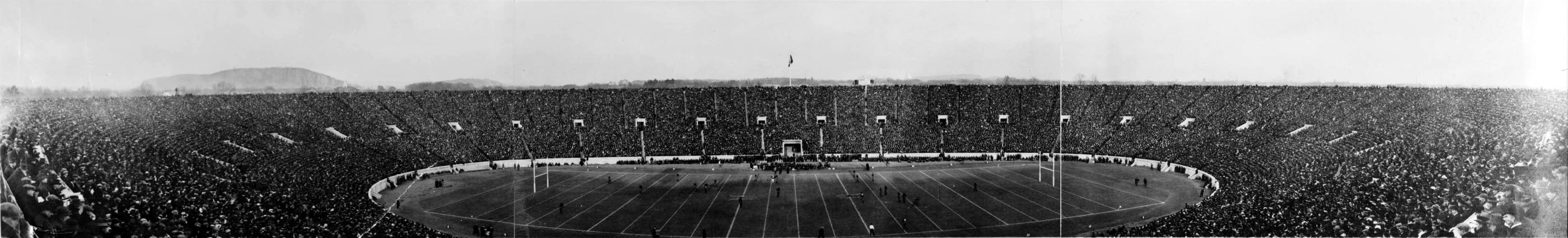
- Harvard–Yale game
- Champion(s): Army; Illinois; Texas

The 1914 college football season had no clear-cut champion, with the Official NCAA Division I Football Records Book listing Army, Illinois, and Texas as having been selected national champions, all retroactively. Army and Illinois claim a national championship for the 1914 season.

== Conference program and changes ==
=== Conference changes ===
- Three conferences began football play in 1914:
  - Oklahoma Intercollegiate Conference – active through the 1928 season; one of two conferences to bear this name, the second would be active between 1974 and 1996
  - Hawkeye College Conference – active through the 1917 season
  - Kentucky Intercollegiate Athletic Association – active through the 1916 season

=== Membership changes ===
| School | 1913 Conference | 1914 Conference |
|---|---|---|
| Colorado College Tigers | Independent | Rocky Mountain |
| Georgia Tech Yellow Jackets | SIAA | Independent |
| Louisville Cardinals | Independent | KIAA |
| Southern California Trojans | Reinstated Program | Independent |
| Texas State M&M Miners | Program Established | Independent |
| Utah Agricultural Aggies | Independent | Rocky Mountain |

=== Program changes ===
- After reinstating their football program after a 3-year hiatus, the University of Southern California Methodists officially changed their nickname to the now-eponymous Trojans.

== Stadiums ==
=== Final Season ===
- Alabama plays their final season at The Quad. The Quad has been Alabama's home field since their first home game in 1893. The final game at The Quad was a 21–3 victory over Chattanooga on 11/13/1914. For 1915, Alabama would move into University Field on the southern edge of campus.

== Conference standings ==
=== Major conference standings ===
1914 Missouri Valley Conference football standings
| | Conf. | | | | | Overall |
| Team | W | | L | | T | W | | L | | T |
|---|---|---|---|---|---|---|---|---|---|---|
| Nebraska $ | 3 | – | 0 | – | 0 | 7 | – | 0 | – | 1 |
| Missouri | 4 | – | 1 | – | 0 | 5 | – | 3 | – | 0 |
| Iowa State | 2 | – | 1 | – | 0 | 4 | – | 3 | – | 0 |
| Kansas | 2 | – | 2 | – | 0 | 5 | – | 2 | – | 1 |
| Washington University | 0 | – | 1 | – | 1 | 3 | – | 3 | – | 1 |
| Drake | 0 | – | 3 | – | 1 | 4 | – | 3 | – | 1 |
| Kansas State | 0 | – | 3 | – | 0 | 1 | – | 5 | – | 1 |
$ – Conference champion

1914 South Atlantic Intercollegiate Athletic Association football standings
| | Conf. | | | | | Overall |
| Team | W | | L | | T | W | | L | | T |
|---|---|---|---|---|---|---|---|---|---|---|
| Washington and Lee + | 3 | – | 0 | – | 0 | 9 | – | 0 | – | 0 |
| Virginia + | 3 | – | 0 | – | 0 | 8 | – | 1 | – | 0 |
| North Carolina | 1 | – | 1 | – | 0 | 10 | – | 1 | – | 0 |
| VPI | 1 | – | 1 | – | 0 | 6 | – | 2 | – | 1 |
| Georgetown | 0 | – | 1 | – | 1 | 2 | – | 4 | – | 2 |
| North Carolina A&M | 0 | – | 2 | – | 1 | 3 | – | 3 | – | 1 |
| St. John's (MD) | 0 | – | 1 | – | 0 | 0 | – | 1 | – | 0 |
| Johns Hopkins | 0 | – | 1 | – | 0 | 0 | – | 2 | – | 0 |
| Richmond | 0 | – | 2 | – | 0 | 5 | – | 4 | – | 0 |
+ – Conference co-champions

1914 Northwest Conference football standings
| | Conf. | | | | | Overall |
| Team | W | | L | | T | W | | L | | T |
|---|---|---|---|---|---|---|---|---|---|---|
| Washington $ | 3 | – | 0 | – | 1 | 6 | – | 0 | – | 1 |
| Oregon Agricultural | 2 | – | 0 | – | 2 | 7 | – | 0 | – | 2 |
| Oregon | 3 | – | 1 | – | 1 | 4 | – | 2 | – | 1 |
| Washington State | 2 | – | 3 | – | 0 | 2 | – | 4 | – | 0 |
| Idaho | 1 | – | 3 | – | 0 | 2 | – | 3 | – | 1 |
| Whitman | 0 | – | 4 | – | 0 | 0 | – | 4 | – | 0 |
$ – Conference champion

1914 Southern Intercollegiate Athletic Association football standings
| | Conf. | | | | | Overall |
| Team | W | | L | | T | W | | L | | T |
|---|---|---|---|---|---|---|---|---|---|---|
| Tennessee + | 6 | – | 0 | – | 0 | 9 | – | 0 | – | 0 |
| Auburn + | 4 | – | 0 | – | 1 | 8 | – | 0 | – | 1 |
| Texas A&M | 2 | – | 0 | – | 0 | 6 | – | 1 | – | 1 |
| Ole Miss | 2 | – | 1 | – | 1 | 5 | – | 4 | – | 1 |
| Mississippi A&M | 4 | – | 2 | – | 0 | 6 | – | 2 | – | 0 |
| Sewanee | 4 | – | 2 | – | 0 | 5 | – | 3 | – | 0 |
| Florida | 3 | – | 2 | – | 0 | 5 | – | 2 | – | 0 |
| Georgia | 2 | – | 2 | – | 1 | 3 | – | 5 | – | 1 |
| Clemson | 2 | – | 2 | – | 0 | 5 | – | 3 | – | 1 |
| Alabama | 3 | – | 3 | – | 0 | 5 | – | 4 | – | 0 |
| Kentucky | 1 | – | 1 | – | 0 | 5 | – | 3 | – | 0 |
| LSU | 1 | – | 2 | – | 1 | 4 | – | 4 | – | 1 |
| Chattanooga | 1 | – | 3 | – | 0 | 5 | – | 4 | – | 0 |
| Vanderbilt | 1 | – | 3 | – | 0 | 2 | – | 6 | – | 0 |
| Mississippi College | 0 | – | 1 | – | 1 | 4 | – | 3 | – | 1 |
| Wofford | 0 | – | 1 | – | 0 | 1 | – | 7 | – | 1 |
| Central University | 0 | – | 1 | – | 0 | 1 | – | 3 | – | 1 |
| Mercer | 0 | – | 3 | – | 0 | 5 | – | 4 | – | 0 |
| Tulane | 0 | – | 3 | – | 1 | 3 | – | 3 | – | 1 |
| The Citadel | 0 | – | 3 | – | 0 | 2 | – | 5 | – | 0 |
+ – Conference co-champions

1914 Rocky Mountain Conference football standings
| | Conf. | | | | | Overall |
| Team | W | | L | | T | W | | L | | T |
|---|---|---|---|---|---|---|---|---|---|---|
| Colorado Mines $ | 5 | – | 0 | – | 1 | 5 | – | 0 | – | 1 |
| Colorado | 4 | – | 1 | – | 0 | 5 | – | 1 | – | 0 |
| Colorado College | 3 | – | 1 | – | 1 | 4 | – | 1 | – | 1 |
| Colorado Agricultural | 3 | – | 3 | – | 0 | 3 | – | 4 | – | 0 |
| Utah | 2 | – | 3 | – | 0 | 3 | – | 3 | – | 0 |
| Utah Agricultural | 1 | – | 2 | – | 0 | 2 | – | 5 | – | 0 |
| Denver | 1 | – | 4 | – | 0 | 5 | – | 4 | – | 0 |
| Wyoming | 0 | – | 5 | – | 0 | 1 | – | 5 | – | 0 |
$ – Conference champion

1914 Western Conference football standings
| | Conf. | | | | | Overall |
| Team | W | | L | | T | W | | L | | T |
|---|---|---|---|---|---|---|---|---|---|---|
| Illinois $ | 6 | – | 0 | – | 0 | 7 | – | 0 | – | 0 |
| Minnesota | 3 | – | 1 | – | 0 | 6 | – | 1 | – | 0 |
| Chicago | 4 | – | 2 | – | 1 | 4 | – | 2 | – | 1 |
| Wisconsin | 2 | – | 2 | – | 1 | 4 | – | 2 | – | 1 |
| Ohio State | 2 | – | 2 | – | 0 | 5 | – | 2 | – | 0 |
| Purdue | 2 | – | 2 | – | 0 | 5 | – | 2 | – | 0 |
| Iowa | 1 | – | 2 | – | 0 | 4 | – | 3 | – | 0 |
| Indiana | 1 | – | 4 | – | 0 | 3 | – | 4 | – | 0 |
| Northwestern | 0 | – | 6 | – | 0 | 1 | – | 6 | – | 0 |
$ – Conference champion

=== Independents ===
1914 Eastern college football independents records
| | Conf. | | | Overall |
| Team | W | L | T | W | | L | | T |
|---|---|---|---|---|---|---|---|---|
| Army | | – | | 9 | – | 0 | – | 0 |
| Harvard | | – | | 7 | – | 0 | – | 2 |
| Washington & Jefferson | | – | | 10 | – | 1 | – | 0 |
| Dartmouth | | – | | 8 | – | 1 | – | 0 |
| Lehigh | | – | | 8 | – | 1 | – | 0 |
| Pittsburgh | | – | | 8 | – | 1 | – | 0 |
| Cornell | | – | | 8 | – | 2 | – | 0 |
| Yale | | – | | 7 | – | 2 | – | 0 |
| Franklin & Marshall | | – | | 6 | – | 2 | – | 1 |
| Colgate | | – | | 5 | – | 2 | – | 1 |
| Princeton | | – | | 5 | – | 2 | – | 1 |
| Brown | | – | | 5 | – | 2 | – | 2 |
| Fordham | | – | | 6 | – | 3 | – | 1 |
| Geneva | | – | | 5 | – | 3 | – | 0 |
| Tufts | | – | | 5 | – | 3 | – | 0 |
| Penn State | | – | | 5 | – | 3 | – | 1 |
| Rutgers | | – | | 5 | – | 3 | – | 1 |
| Lafayette | | – | | 5 | – | 3 | – | 2 |
| Syracuse | | – | | 5 | – | 3 | – | 2 |
| Boston College | | – | | 5 | – | 4 | – | 0 |
| NYU | | – | | 5 | – | 4 | – | 0 |
| Villanova | | – | | 4 | – | 3 | – | 1 |
| Bucknell | | – | | 4 | – | 4 | – | 1 |
| Carnegie Tech | | – | | 4 | – | 4 | – | 0 |
| Penn | | – | | 4 | – | 4 | – | 1 |
| Temple | | – | | 3 | – | 3 | – | 0 |
| Rhode Island State | | – | | 2 | – | 3 | – | 3 |
| Carlisle | | – | | 5 | – | 10 | – | 1 |
| Holy Cross | | – | | 2 | – | 5 | – | 1 |
| Vermont | | – | | 2 | – | 6 | – | 1 |
| New Hampshire | | – | | 1 | – | 6 | – | 2 |
| Duquesne | | – | | 1 | – | 5 | – | 0 |

1914 Midwestern college football independents records
| | Conf. | | | Overall |
| Team | W | L | T | W | | L | | T |
|---|---|---|---|---|---|---|---|---|
| Western State Normal (MI) | | – | | 6 | – | 0 | – | 0 |
| Northern Illinois State | | – | | 7 | – | 0 | – | 1 |
| Notre Dame | | – | | 6 | – | 2 | – | 0 |
| Michigan Agricultural | | – | | 5 | – | 2 | – | 0 |
| Butler | | – | | 4 | – | 2 | – | 0 |
| South Dakota | | – | | 5 | – | 2 | – | 1 |
| Michigan | | – | | 6 | – | 3 | – | 0 |
| North Dakota Agricultural | | – | | 5 | – | 3 | – | 0 |
| Haskell | | – | | 5 | – | 4 | – | 0 |
| Michigan State Normal | | – | | 3 | – | 2 | – | 1 |
| Heidelberg | | – | | 4 | – | 3 | – | 1 |
| Akron | | – | | 4 | – | 4 | – | 1 |
| Doane | | – | | 3 | – | 3 | – | 2 |
| Saint Louis | | – | | 4 | – | 4 | – | 0 |
| St. Mary's (OH) | | – | | 2 | – | 2 | – | 0 |
| Wabash | | – | | 2 | – | 2 | – | 2 |
| Detroit | | – | | 2 | – | 3 | – | 2 |
| Lake Forest | | – | | 3 | – | 5 | – | 0 |
| Iowa State Teachers | | – | | 2 | – | 5 | – | 1 |
| Lincoln (MO) | | – | | 1 | – | 3 | – | 0 |
| Marquette | | – | | 2 | – | 7 | – | 0 |
| Rose Poly | | – | | 0 | – | 7 | – | 0 |

1914 Southern college football independents records
| | Conf. | | | Overall |
| Team | W | L | T | W | | L | | T |
|---|---|---|---|---|---|---|---|---|
| Texas | | – | | 8 | – | 0 | – | 0 |
| Middle Tennessee State Normal | | – | | 5 | – | 0 | – | 1 |
| Oklahoma | | – | | 9 | – | 1 | – | 1 |
| Delaware | | – | | 7 | – | 1 | – | 1 |
| Davidson | | – | | 5 | – | 1 | – | 1 |
| Birmingham | | – | | 3 | – | 1 | – | 1 |
| Georgia Tech | | – | | 6 | – | 2 | – | 0 |
| Presbyterian | | – | | 4 | – | 1 | – | 1 |
| Oklahoma A&M | | – | | 6 | – | 2 | – | 1 |
| Navy | | – | | 6 | – | 3 | – | 0 |
| Maryland | | – | | 5 | – | 3 | – | 0 |
| Southwestern Louisiana Industrial | | – | | 5 | – | 3 | – | 0 |
| Howard (AL) | | – | | 4 | – | 3 | – | 1 |
| Maryville (TN) | | – | | 6 | – | 4 | – | 0 |
| Sam Houston Normal | | – | | 3 | – | 2 | – | 0 |
| Marshall | | – | | 5 | – | 4 | – | 0 |
| West Virginia | | – | | 5 | – | 4 | – | 0 |
| Rice | | – | | 3 | – | 2 | – | 3 |
| North Texas State Normal | | – | | 3 | – | 3 | – | 0 |
| South Carolina | | – | | 5 | – | 5 | – | 1 |
| VMI | | – | | 4 | – | 4 | – | 0 |
| Mississippi Normal | | – | | 2 | – | 3 | – | 1 |
| Texas Mines | | – | | 2 | – | 3 | – | 0 |
| Western Kentucky State Normal | | – | | 1 | – | 2 | – | 0 |
| Baylor | | – | | 3 | – | 5 | – | 2 |
| West Tennessee State Normal | | – | | 3 | – | 5 | – | 0 |
| Arkansas | | – | | 3 | – | 6 | – | 0 |
| Louisiana Industrial | | – | | 2 | – | 4 | – | 0 |
| Wake Forest | | – | | 3 | – | 6 | – | 0 |
| Furman | | – | | 2 | – | 5 | – | 0 |
| Southwest Texas State | | – | | 2 | – | 6 | – | 0 |
| Stetson | | – | | 1 | – | 4 | – | 0 |
| Louisville | | – | | 1 | – | 7 | – | 0 |
| Catholic University | | – | | 0 | – | 6 | – | 1 |

1914 Western college football independents records
| | Conf. | | | Overall |
| Team | W | L | T | W | | L | | T |
|---|---|---|---|---|---|---|---|---|
| Cheney Normal | | – | | 2 | – | 0 | – | 0 |
| Montana | | – | | 7 | – | 0 | – | 1 |
| Arizona | | – | | 5 | – | 1 | – | 0 |
| Montana A&M | | – | | 5 | – | 1 | – | 0 |
| New Mexico | | – | | 3 | – | 1 | – | 1 |
| New Mexico A&M | | – | | 4 | – | 2 | – | 1 |
| Tempe Normal | | – | | 4 | – | 3 | – | 0 |
| USC | | – | | 4 | – | 3 | – | 0 |

=== Minor conferences ===
| Conference | Champion(s) | Record |
|---|---|---|
| Central Intercollegiate Athletics Association | Hampton Institute; Howard; Lincoln (PA) | 2–1; 1–1; 1–1 |
| Inter-Normal Athletic Conference of Wisconsin | Whitewater Normal | 4–0 |
| Kansas Collegiate Athletic Conference | Friends (KS) | — |
| Kentucky Intercollegiate Athletic Association | Transylvania | — |
| Louisiana Intercollegiate Athletic Association | Southwestern Louisiana Industrial | 5–0 |
| Michigan Intercollegiate Athletic Association | Olivet; Hillsdale | 3–1 |
| Ohio Athletic Conference | Denison | 5–1 |
| Oklahoma Intercollegiate Conference | Central State Teachers | — |
| Southern Intercollegiate Athletic Conference | Talladega | — |
| Texas Intercollegiate Athletic Association | Texas | — |

=== Minor conference standings ===
1913 Colored Intercollegiate Athletic Association football standings
| | Conf. | | | | | Overall |
| Team | W | | L | | T | W | | L | | T |
|---|---|---|---|---|---|---|---|---|---|---|
| Hampton $ | 2 | – | 1 | – | 0 | 3 | – | 1 | – | 0 |
| Howard | 1 | – | 1 | – | 0 | 4 | – | 1 | – | 0 |
| Lincoln (PA) | 1 | – | 1 | – | 0 | 1 | – | 1 | – | 0 |
| Virginia Union | 0 | – | 1 | – | 0 | 1 | – | 1 | – | 0 |
$ – Conference champion

1914 Eastern Virginia Intercollegiate Athletic Association football standings
| | Conf. | | | | | Overall |
| Team | W | | L | | T | W | | L | | T |
|---|---|---|---|---|---|---|---|---|---|---|
| Richmond $ | 5 | – | 1 | – | 0 | 5 | – | 4 | – | 0 |
| Randolph–Macon | 3 | – | 3 | – | 0 | 5 | – | 5 | – | 0 |
| Hampden–Sydney | 3 | – | 3 | – | 0 | 3 | – | 7 | – | 1 |
| William & Mary | 1 | – | 5 | – | 0 | 1 | – | 7 | – | 0 |
$ – Conference champion

1914 Illinois Intercollegiate Athletic Conference football standings
| | Conf. | | | | | Overall |
| Team | W | | L | | T | W | | L | | T |
|---|---|---|---|---|---|---|---|---|---|---|
| Carthage | 1 | – | 2 | – | 0 | 3 | – | 2 | – | 0 |
| Southern Illinois | | | – | | | 2 | – | 5 | – | 1 |

1914 Michigan Intercollegiate Athletic Association football standings
| | Conf. | | | | | Overall |
| Team | W | | L | | T | W | | L | | T |
|---|---|---|---|---|---|---|---|---|---|---|
| Olivet + | 3 | – | 1 | – | 0 | 5 | – | 3 | – | 0 |
| Hillsdale + | 3 | – | 1 | – | 0 | 3 | – | 3 | – | 1 |
| Kalamazoo | 3 | – | 1 | – | 0 | 4 | – | 1 | – | 0 |
| Albion | 1 | – | 4 | – | 0 | 1 | – | 6 | – | 0 |
| Adrian | 0 | – | 1 | – | 0 | 3 | – | 3 | – | 0 |
| Alma | 0 | – | 2 | – | 0 | 2 | – | 5 | – | 1 |
+ – Conference co-champions

1914 Ohio Athletic Conference football standings
| | Conf. | | | | | Overall |
| Team | W | | L | | T | W | | L | | T |
|---|---|---|---|---|---|---|---|---|---|---|
| Denison $ | 5 | – | 1 | – | 0 | 7 | – | 1 | – | 0 |
| Mount Union | 4 | – | 1 | – | 0 | 6 | – | 4 | – | 0 |
| Cincinnati | 4 | – | 2 | – | 0 | 6 | – | 3 | – | 0 |
| Miami (OH) | 4 | – | 2 | – | 0 | 5 | – | 3 | – | 0 |
| Ohio | 3 | – | 3 | – | 0 | 4 | – | 4 | – | 0 |
| Oberlin | 3 | – | 4 | – | 0 | 4 | – | 4 | – | 0 |
| Case | 3 | – | 4 | – | 0 | 4 | – | 6 | – | 0 |
| Kenyon | 2 | – | 3 | – | 0 | 4 | – | 3 | – | 1 |
| Western Reserve | 2 | – | 4 | – | 0 | 4 | – | 6 | – | 0 |
| Wooster | 2 | – | 5 | – | 0 | 2 | – | 6 | – | 0 |
| Ohio Wesleyan | 2 | – | 6 | – | 0 | 3 | – | 7 | – | 0 |
| Wittenberg | 0 | – | 3 | – | 0 | 3 | – | 6 | – | 0 |
| Ohio State * | 3 | – | 0 | – | 0 | 5 | – | 2 | – | 0 |
$ – Conference champion; * – did not complete for championship

1914 Texas Intercollegiate Athletic Association football standings
| | Conf. | | | | | Overall |
| Team | W | | L | | T | W | | L | | T |
|---|---|---|---|---|---|---|---|---|---|---|
| Texas $ | 4 | – | 0 | – | 0 | 8 | – | 0 | – | 0 |
| Texas A&M | 4 | – | 0 | – | 0 | 6 | – | 1 | – | 1 |
| Rice | 3 | – | 2 | – | 2 | 3 | – | 2 | – | 3 |
| Southwestern (TX) | 3 | – | 2 | – | 0 | 4 | – | 4 | – | 0 |
| Trinity (TX) | 3 | – | 2 | – | 2 | 4 | – | 2 | – | 2 |
| Daniel Baker | 3 | – | 2 | – | 0 | 6 | – | 3 | – | 0 |
| Baylor | 2 | – | 4 | – | 2 | 3 | – | 5 | – | 2 |
| TCU | 1 | – | 3 | – | 1 | 3 | – | 4 | – | 1 |
| Austin | 0 | – | 5 | – | 2 | 0 | – | 6 | – | 2 |
$ – Conference champion

1914 Wisconsin Normal Athletic Conference football standings
| | Conf. | | | | | Overall |
| Team | W | | L | | T | W | | L | | T |
|---|---|---|---|---|---|---|---|---|---|---|
| Whitewater Normal $ | 4 | – | 0 | – | 0 | 6 | – | 0 | – | 0 |
| River Falls Normal | 3 | – | 1 | – | 0 | 8 | – | 1 | – | 0 |
| Platteville Normal | 2 | – | 2 | – | 0 | 2 | – | 5 | – | 0 |
| La Crosse Normal | 2 | – | 2 | – | 0 | 2 | – | 6 | – | 0 |
| Stevens Point Normal | 1 | – | 2 | – | 0 | 6 | – | 2 | – | 0 |
| Milwaukee Normal | 1 | – | 2 | – | 0 | 3 | – | 5 | – | 0 |
| Oshkosh Normal | 1 | – | 2 | – | 0 | 2 | – | 5 | – | 0 |
| Superior Normal | 0 | – | 3 | – | 0 | 2 | – | 3 | – | 0 |
$ – Conference champion

== Awards and honors ==
=== All-Americans ===
The consensus All-America team included:

| Position | Name | Height | Weight (lbs.) | Class | Hometown | Team |
|---|---|---|---|---|---|---|
| QB | Charley Barrett | 6'0" | 180 | Jr. | Cleveland, Ohio | Cornell |
| HB | John Maulbetsch | 5'9" | 153 | So. | Ann Arbor, Michigan | Michigan |
| HB | Eddie Mahan | 5'11" | 171 | Jr. | Natick, Massachusetts | Harvard |
| HB | Johnny Spiegel | | | Sr. | | Washington & Jefferson |
| FB | Harry LeGore | | | Jr. | Woodsboro, Maryland | Yale |
| E | Huntington Hardwick | 6'0" | 171 | Sr. | Quincy, Massachusetts | Harvard |
| E | John E. O'Hearn | 5'10" | 173 | Sr. | Brookline, Massachusetts | Cornell |
| T | Harold Ballin | 6'1" | 194 | Sr. | New York, New York | Princeton |
| G | Stan Pennock | 5'8" | 193 | Sr. | Syracuse, New York | Harvard |
| G | Clarence Spears | | | Jr. | De Witt, Arkansas | Dartmouth |
| C | John McEwan | 6'4" | 200 | So. | Alexandria, Minnesota | Army |
| G | Ralph Chapman | | | Sr. | Vienna, Illinois | Illinois |
| T | Walter H. Trumbull | | | Sr. | Salem, Massachusetts | Harvard |
| E | Perry Graves | | | Jr. | Rockford, Illinois | Illinois |

== Statistical leaders ==
- Player scoring most points: Buck Mayer, Virginia, 142
