= 1914 Lincoln Tigers football team =

American college football season

1914 Lincoln Tigers football
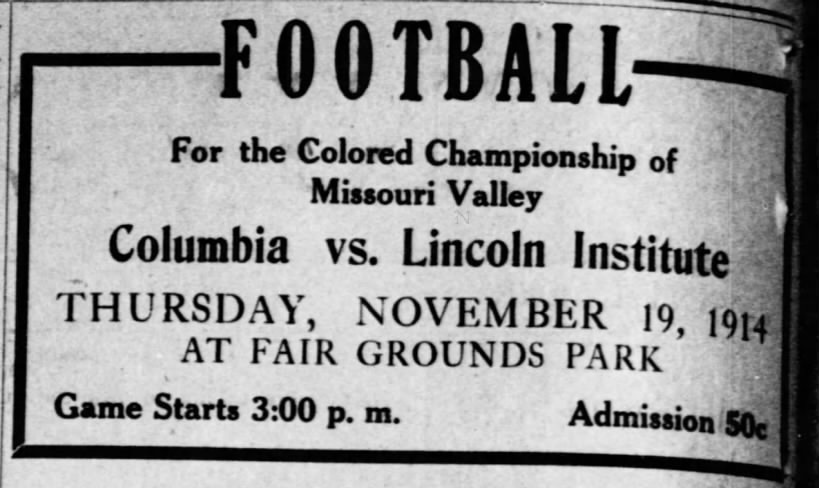
- Columbia AC vs. Lincoln Institute
- Conference: Missouri Valley Conference for Black Schools
- Record: 1–3 (1–2 Missouri Valley Conference for Black Schools)
- Head coach: Romeo West (6th season)

1914 Missouri Valley Conference for Black Schools football standings
	Conf.					Overall
Team	W		L		T	W		L		T
Columbia Athletics $	2	–	0	–	0	2	–	0	–	0
Western University	1	–	0	–	0	1	–	0	–	0
Lincoln (MO)	1	–	2	–	0	1	–	3	–	0
Lawrence Athletics	1	–	1	–	0	1	–	1	–	0
George R. Smith	0	–	2	–	0	0	–	2	–	0
Western College			–			0	–	0	–	0
$ – Conference champion

The 1914 Lincoln Blue Tigers football team represented Lincoln Institute—now known as Lincoln University—in Jefferson City, Missouri as a member of the Missouri Valley Conference for Black Schools during the 1914 college football season.. Led by head coach Romeo West, the team compiled a record of 1–3., and a 1–2 record in conference. The Tigers were one of the top contending teams in the Missouri Valley heading into the title-deciding game, in which the Tigers were ultimately beaten by Columbia Athletics.

== Schedule ==
Date	Time	Opponent	Site	Result	Source
		Jefferson City		L 0–44	
November 7		at Lawrence Athletic Club	Jefferson City, MO	W 20–7	
November 19	3:00 p.m.	at Columbia Athletics	Fair Grounds Park; Columbia, MO	L 14–47	
November 26	3:00 p.m.	at Western University (KS)	Brenneisen's Park; Kansas City, MO	L 12–24	
