= 1914 Western Conference football season =

- Sport: Football
- Champion: Illinois

Football seasons
- 1913 1915

1914 Western Conference football standings
	Conf.					Overall
Team	W		L		T	W		L		T
Illinois $	6	–	0	–	0	7	–	0	–	0
Minnesota	3	–	1	–	0	6	–	1	–	0
Chicago	4	–	2	–	1	4	–	2	–	1
Wisconsin	2	–	2	–	1	4	–	2	–	1
Ohio State	2	–	2	–	0	5	–	2	–	0
Purdue	2	–	2	–	0	5	–	2	–	0
Iowa	1	–	2	–	0	4	–	3	–	0
Indiana	1	–	4	–	0	3	–	4	–	0
Northwestern	0	–	6	–	0	1	–	6	–	0
$ – Conference champion

The 1914 Western Conference football season was the nineteenth season of college football played by the member schools of the Western Conference (later known as the Big Ten Conference) and was a part of the 1914 college football season.

== Season overview ==
Illinois took the 1914 Western Conference title with a perfect 6-0 league record, going 7–0 overall for the season.

Minnesota came in second at 6-0-1 (3-1 WC). Chicago was third at 4-2-1 (overall and in conference play).

Wisconsin finished at 2-2-1 in the conference, and 4-2-1 overall. Ohio State and Purdue were right behind, both with 2-2 league records and 5–2 overall marks.

Iowa (4–3, 1-2 WC), Indiana (3–4, 1-4 WC), and Northwestern (1–6, 0-6 WC) rounded out the table.

=== Illinois ===
Date	Opponent	Site	Result	Attendance	Source
October 3	Christian Brothers (MO)*	Illinois Field; Champaign, IL	W 37–0		
October 10	Indiana	Illinois Field; Champaign, IL (rivalry)	W 51–0		
October 17	Ohio State	Illinois Field; Champaign, IL (rivalry)	W 37–0		
October 24	at Northwestern	Northwestern Field; Evanston, IL	W 33–0		
October 31	at Minnesota	Northrop Field; Minneapolis, MN	W 21–6	10,000	
November 14	Chicago	Illinois Field; Champaign, IL	W 21–7		
November 21	at Wisconsin	Randall Field; Madison, WI	W 24–9		
*Non-conference game

=== Minnesota ===
Date	Opponent	Site	Result	Attendance	Source
October 3	North Dakota*	Northrop Field; Minneapolis, MN	W 28–6	2,000	
October 10	Iowa State*	Northrop Field; Minneapolis, MN	W 26–0	3,000	
October 17	South Dakota*	Northrop Field; Minneapolis, MN	W 29–7	3,000	
October 24	at Iowa	Iowa Field; Iowa City, IA (rivalry)	W 7–0	9,000	
October 31	Illinois	Northrop Field; Minneapolis, MN	L 6–21	10,000	
November 14	Wisconsin^{†}	Northrop Field; Minneapolis, MN (rivalry)	W 14–3	17,000	
November 21	at Chicago	Stagg Field; Chicago, IL	W 13–7	13,000	
*Non-conference game; ^{†}Homecoming

=== Chicago ===
Date	Opponent	Site	Result	Attendance	Source
October 3	Indiana	Stagg Field; Chicago, IL	W 34–0		
October 10	Northwestern	Stagg Field; Chicago, IL	W 28–0		
October 17	Iowa	Stagg Field; Chicago, IL	W 7–0		
October 24	Purdue	Stagg Field; Chicago, IL (rivalry)	W 21–0		
October 31	at Wisconsin	Randall Field; Madison, WI	T 0–0		
November 14	at Illinois	Illinois Field; Champaign, IL	L 7–21		
November 21	Minnesota	Stagg Field; Chicago, IL	L 7–13	13,000	

=== Wisconsin ===
Date	Opponent	Site	Result	Attendance	Source
October 3	Lawrence*	Randall Field; Madison, WI	W 21–0		
October 10	Marquette*	Randall Field; Madison, WI	W 48–0		
October 17	Purdue	Randall Field; Madison, WI	W 14–7		
October 24	at Ohio State	Ohio Field; Columbus, OH	W 7–6		
October 31	Chicago^{†}	Randall Field; Madison, WI	T 0–0		
November 14	at Minnesota	Northrop Field; Minneapolis, MN (rivalry)	L 3–14	17,000	
November 21	Illinois	Randall Field; Madison, WI	L 9–24		
*Non-conference game; ^{†}Homecoming

=== Ohio State ===
Date	Opponent	Site	Result	Source
October 3	Ohio Wesleyan	Ohio Field; Columbus, OH	W 16–2	
October 10	Case	Van Horn Field; Cleveland, OH	W 7–6	
October 17	at Illinois	Illinois Field; Champaign, IL (rivalry)	L 0–37	
October 24	Wisconsin	Ohio Field; Columbus, OH	L 6–7	
November 7	vs. Indiana	Washington Park; Indianapolis, IN	W 13–3	
November 14	Oberlin	Ohio Field; Columbus, OH	W 39–0	
November 21	Northwestern	Ohio Field; Columbus, OH	W 27–0	

=== Purdue ===
Date	Opponent	Site	Result	Source
October 3	Wabash*	Stuart Field; West Lafayette, IN	W 27–3	
October 10	Western Reserve*	Stuart Field; West Lafayette, IN	W 26–0	
October 17	at Wisconsin	Randall Field; Madison, WI	L 7–14	
October 24	at Chicago	Stagg Field; Chicago, IL (rivalry)	L 0–21	
November 7	Kentucky*	Stuart Field; West Lafayette, IN	W 40–6	
November 14	at Northwestern	Northwestern Field; Evanston, IL	W 34–6	
November 21	Indiana	Stuart Field; West Lafayette, IN (Old Oaken Bucket)	W 23–13	
*Non-conference game

=== Iowa ===
Date	Opponent	Site	Result	Attendance	Source
October 3	Iowa State Teachers*	Iowa Field; Iowa City, IA	W 95–0		
October 10	Cornell (IA)*	Iowa Field; Iowa City, IA	W 49–0		
October 17	at Chicago	Stagg Field; Chicago, IL	L 0–7		
October 24	Minnesota^{†}	Iowa Field; Iowa City, IA (rivalry)	L 0–7	9,000	
November 7	at Northwestern	Northwestern Field; Evanston, IL	W 27–0		
November 14	at Iowa State*	State Field; Ames, IA (rivalry)	W 26–6		
November 21	Nebraska*	Iowa Field; Iowa City, IA (rivalry)	L 7–16		
*Non-conference game; ^{†}Homecoming

=== Indiana ===
Date	Opponent	Site	Result	Source
September 26	DePauw*	Jordan Field; Bloomington, IN	W 13–6	
October 3	at Chicago	Stagg Field; Chicago, IL	L 0–34	
October 10	at Illinois	Illinois Field; Champaign, IL (rivalry)	L 0–51	
October 17	Northwestern	Jordan Field; Bloomington, IN	W 27–0	
October 24	Miami (OH)*	Jordan Field; Bloomington, IN	W 48–3	
November 7	vs. Ohio State	Washington Park; Indianapolis, IN	L 3–13	
November 21	at Purdue	Stuart Field; West Lafayette, IN (rivalry)	L 13–23	
*Non-conference game

=== Northwestern ===
Date	Opponent	Site	Result	Source
October 3	Lake Forest*	Northwestern Field; Evanston, IL	W 7–0	
October 10	at Chicago	Stagg Field; Chicago, IL	L 0–28	
October 17	at Indiana	Jordan Field; Bloomington, IN	L 0–27	
October 24	Illinois	Northwestern Field; Evanston, IL (rivalry)	L 0–33	
November 7	Iowa	Northwestern Field; Evanston, IL	L 0–27	
November 14	Purdue	Northwestern Field; Evanston, IL	L 6–34	
November 21	at Ohio State	Ohio Field; Columbus, OH	L 0–27	
*Non-conference game

=== Bowl games ===
No Western Conference schools participated in any bowl games during the 1914 season.
