= 1917 Kansas Jayhawks football team =

American college football season

1917 Kansas Jayhawks football
- Conference: Missouri Valley Conference
- Record: 6–2 (3–1 MVC)
- Head coach: Herman Olcott (3rd season)
- Captain: Harry Neilson
- Home stadium: McCook Field

1917 Missouri Valley Conference football standings
	Conf.					Overall
Team	W		L		T	W		L		T
Nebraska $	2	–	0	–	0	5	–	2	–	0
Kansas	3	–	1	–	0	6	–	2	–	0
Iowa State	3	–	1	–	0	5	–	2	–	0
Kansas State	2	–	2	–	0	6	–	2	–	0
Missouri	2	–	4	–	0	3	–	5	–	0
Washington University	1	–	2	–	0	4	–	3	–	0
Drake	0	–	3	–	0	0	–	5	–	2
$ – Conference champion

The 1917 Kansas Jayhawks football team was an American football team that represented the University of Kansas in the Missouri Valley Conference (MVC) during the 1917 college football season. In their third and final season under head coach Herman Olcott, the Jayhawks compiled a 6–2 record (3–1 against conference opponents), tied for second place in the MVC, and outscored opponents by a total of 126 to 46. They played their home games at McCook Field in Lawrence, Kansas. Harry Neilson was the team captain.

== Schedule ==
Date	Opponent	Site	Result	Attendance	Source
October 6	at Illinois*	Illinois Field; Champaign, IL	L 0–22		
October 13	Kansas State Normal*	McCook Field; Lawrence, KS	W 33–0		
October 20	Washburn*	McCook Field; Lawrence, KS	W 34–2		
October 27	Iowa State	McCook Field; Lawrence, KS	W 7–0		
November 3	at Kansas State	Ahearn Field; Manhattan, KS (rivalry)	W 9–0		
November 10	at Oklahoma*	Boyd Field; Norman, OK	W 13–6		
November 17	Nebraska^{†}	McCook Field; Lawrence, KS (rivalry)	L 3–13	5,000	
November 29	Missouri	Rollins Field; Columbia, MO (rivalry)	W 27–3	10,000	
*Non-conference game; ^{†}Homecoming
