= 1920 Kansas State Wildcats football team =

American college football season

1920 Kansas State Wildcats football
- Conference: Missouri Valley Conference
- Record: 3–3–3 (0–3–1 MVC)
- Head coach: Charlie Bachman (1st season)
- Offensive scheme: Notre Dame Box
- Home stadium: Ahearn Field

1920 Missouri Valley Conference football standings
	Conf.					Overall
Team	W		L		T	W		L		T
Oklahoma $	4	–	0	–	1	6	–	0	–	1
Missouri	5	–	1	–	0	7	–	1	–	0
Kansas	3	–	2	–	0	5	–	2	–	1
Iowa State	3	–	2	–	0	4	–	4	–	0
Drake	1	–	3	–	1	4	–	5	–	1
Washington University	1	–	4	–	0	4	–	4	–	0
Grinnell	0	–	2	–	1	3	–	3	–	1
Kansas State	0	–	3	–	1	3	–	3	–	3
$ – Conference champion

The 1920 Kansas State Wildcats football team represented Kansas State Agricultural College in the 1920 college football season.

== Schedule ==
Date	Opponent	Site	Result
October 1	Hays Teachers*	Ahearn Field; Manhattan, KS	W 14–0
October 8	Camp Funston*	Ahearn Field; Manhattan, KS	W 55–0
October 15	Kansas State Normal*	Ahearn Field; Manhattan, KS	T 7–7
October 22	at Creighton*	Omaha, NE	W 3–0
October 30	Kansas	Ahearn Field; Manhattan, KS (rivalry)	L 0–14
November 6	at Missouri	Rollins Field; Columbia, MO	L 7–10
November 13	Iowa State^{†}	Ahearn Field; Manhattan, KS	L 0–17
November 19	Oklahoma	Ahearn Field; Manhattan, KS	T 7–7
November 26	Washburn*	Ahearn Field; Manhattan, KS	T 0–0
*Non-conference game; ^{†}Homecoming
