= 1914 Kansas State Aggies football team =

American college football season

1914 Kansas State Aggies football
- Conference: Missouri Valley Conference
- Record: 1–5–1 (0–3 MVC)
- Head coach: Guy Lowman (4th season)
- Home stadium: Ahearn Field

1914 Missouri Valley Conference football standings
	Conf.					Overall
Team	W		L		T	W		L		T
Nebraska $	3	–	0	–	0	7	–	0	–	1
Missouri	4	–	1	–	0	5	–	3	–	0
Iowa State	2	–	1	–	0	4	–	3	–	0
Kansas	2	–	2	–	0	5	–	2	–	1
Washington University	0	–	1	–	1	3	–	3	–	1
Drake	0	–	3	–	1	4	–	3	–	1
Kansas State	0	–	3	–	0	1	–	5	–	1
$ – Conference champion

The 1914 Kansas State Aggies football team represented Kansas State Agricultural College—now known as Kansas State University—as a member of the Missouri Valley Conference (MVC) during the 1914 college football season. Led by Guy Lowman in his fourth and final season as head coach, the Aggies compiled an overall record of 1–5–1 with a mark of 0–3 in conference play, placing last out of seven teams in the MVC.

== Schedule ==
Date	Opponent	Site	Result	Source
October 3	Southwestern (KS)*	Ahearn Field; Manhattan, KS	W 15–0	
October 10	Kansas State Normal*	Ahearn Field; Manhattan, KS	T 0–0	
October 17	Nebraska	Ahearn Field; Manhattan, KS (rivalry)	L 0–31	
October 24	at Kansas	McCook Field; Lawrence, KS (rivalry)	L 0–28	
October 31	at Missouri	Rollins Field; Columbia, MO	L 3–13	
November 13	Oklahoma*	Ahearn Field; Manhattan, KS	L 10–52	
November 25	Washburn*	Ahearn Field; Manhattan, KS	L 16–25	
*Non-conference game
