= 1920 Oklahoma Sooners football team =

American college football season

1920 Oklahoma Sooners football

MVC champion
- Conference: Missouri Valley Conference
- Record: 6–0–1 (4–0–1 MVC)
- Head coach: Bennie Owen (16th season)
- Offensive scheme: Single-wing
- Captain: Dewey Luster
- Home stadium: Boyd Field

1920 Missouri Valley Conference football standings
	Conf.					Overall
Team	W		L		T	W		L		T
Oklahoma $	4	–	0	–	1	6	–	0	–	1
Missouri	5	–	1	–	0	7	–	1	–	0
Kansas	3	–	2	–	0	5	–	2	–	1
Iowa State	3	–	2	–	0	4	–	4	–	0
Drake	1	–	3	–	1	4	–	5	–	1
Washington University	1	–	4	–	0	4	–	4	–	0
Grinnell	0	–	2	–	1	3	–	3	–	1
Kansas State	0	–	3	–	1	3	–	3	–	3
$ – Conference champion

The 1920 Oklahoma Sooners football team represented the University of Oklahoma as a member of the Missouri Valley Conference (MVC) during the 1920 college football season. In their 16th season under head coach Bennie Owen, the Sooners compiled an overall record of 6–0–1 with a mark of 4–0–1 in conference play, winning the MVC title, and outscored opponents by a combined total of 176 to 51.

Two Sooners were recognized as All-Americans: tackle Roy "Soupy" Smoot and halfback Phil White.

Five Sooners received All-Missouri Valley Intercollegiate Athletic Association honors: back Harry Hill; end Howard Marsh; guard Bill McKinley; tackle Roy Smoot; and back Sol Swatek. Marsh was the first Sooner to receive all-conference honors on three occasions, receiving the honors each year from 1920 to 1922.

== Schedule ==
Date	Opponent	Site	Result	Source
October 9	Central State Teachers*	Boyd Field; Norman, OK	W 16–7	
October 23	at Washington University	Francis Field; St. Louis, MO	W 24–14	
October 30	at Missouri	Rollins Field; Columbia, MO (rivalry)	W 28–7	
November 6	Kansas	Boyd Field; Norman, OK	W 21–9	
November 13	at Oklahoma A&M*	Lewis Field; Stillwater, OK (Bedlam)	W 36–0	
November 19	at Kansas State	Ahearn Field; Manhattan, KS	T 7–7	
November 25	Drake	Boyd Field; Norman, OK	W 44–7	
*Non-conference game
