= 1917 Kansas State Farmers football team =

American college football season

1917 Kansas State Farmers football
- Conference: Missouri Valley Conference
- Record: 6–2 (2–2 MVC)
- Head coach: Zora Clevenger (2nd season)
- Home stadium: Ahearn Field

1917 Missouri Valley Conference football standings
	Conf.					Overall
Team	W		L		T	W		L		T
Nebraska $	2	–	0	–	0	5	–	2	–	0
Kansas	3	–	1	–	0	6	–	2	–	0
Iowa State	3	–	1	–	0	5	–	2	–	0
Kansas State	2	–	2	–	0	6	–	2	–	0
Missouri	2	–	4	–	0	3	–	5	–	0
Washington University	1	–	2	–	0	4	–	3	–	0
Drake	0	–	3	–	0	0	–	5	–	2
$ – Conference champion

The 1917 Kansas State Farmers football team represented Kansas State Agricultural College—now known as Kansas State University—as a member of the Missouri Valley Conference (MVC) during the 1917 college football season. Led by second-year head coach Zora Clevenger, the Farmers compiled an overall record of 6–2 with a mark of 2–2 in conference play, placing fourth in the MVC.

== Schedule ==
Date	Opponent	Site	Result	Source
September 29	Baker*	Ahearn Field; Manhattan, KS	W 28–0	
October 6	Oklahoma A&M*	Ahearn Field; Manhattan, KS	W 23–0	
October 13	at Missouri	Rollins Field; Columbia, MO	W 7–6	
October 20	Washington University	Ahearn Field; Manhattan, KS	W 61–0	
November 3	Kansas^{†}	Ahearn Field; Manhattan, KS (rivalry)	L 0–9	
November 10	at Iowa State	State Field; Ames, IA (rivalry)	L 7–10	
November 22	Kansas State Normal*	Ahearn Field; Manhattan, KS	W 51–0	
November 29	Washburn*	Ahearn Field; Manhattan, KS	W 38–0	
*Non-conference game; ^{†}Homecoming
