= 1920 Kansas Jayhawks football team =

American college football season

1920 Kansas Jayhawks football
- Conference: Missouri Valley Conference
- Record: 5–2–1 (3–2 MVC)
- Head coach: Phog Allen (1st season)
- Captain: George Nettels
- Home stadium: McCook Field

1920 Missouri Valley Conference football standings
	Conf.					Overall
Team	W		L		T	W		L		T
Oklahoma $	4	–	0	–	1	6	–	0	–	1
Missouri	5	–	1	–	0	7	–	1	–	0
Kansas	3	–	2	–	0	5	–	2	–	1
Iowa State	3	–	2	–	0	4	–	4	–	0
Drake	1	–	3	–	1	4	–	5	–	1
Washington University	1	–	4	–	0	4	–	4	–	0
Grinnell	0	–	2	–	1	3	–	3	–	1
Kansas State	0	–	3	–	1	3	–	3	–	3
$ – Conference champion

The 1920 Kansas Jayhawks football team represented the University of Kansas in the Missouri Valley Conference during the 1920 college football season. It was the first and only season under head coach Phog Allen, who is more well known for his accomplishments with the Jayhawks men's basketball team. The Jayhawks compiled a 5–2–1 record (3–2 against conference opponents), tied for third place in the conference. They outscored opponents by a combined total of 117 to 60. They played their home games at McCook Field in Lawrence, Kansas, which was their final season at the venue. George Nettels was the team captain.

== Schedule ==
Date	Opponent	Site	Result	Source
October 2	Kansas State Normal*	McCook Field; Lawrence, KS	W 47–0	
October 9	Washburn*	McCook Field; Lawrence, KS	W 6–0	
October 16	Drake	McCook Field; Lawrence, KS	W 7–3	
October 23	Iowa State	McCook Field; Lawrence, KS	W 7–0	
October 30	at Kansas State	Ahearn Field; Manhattan, KS (Sunflower Showdown)	W 14–0	
November 6	at Oklahoma	Boyd Field; Norman, OK	L 9–21	
November 13	Nebraska*	McCook Field; Lawrence, KS (rivalry)	T 20–20	
November 25	at Missouri	Rollins Field; Columbia, MO (Border War)	L 7–16	
*Non-conference game
