= 1920 Iowa State Cyclones football team =

American college football season

1920 Iowa State Cyclones football
- Conference: Missouri Valley Conference
- Record: 4–4 (3–2 MVC)
- Head coach: Norman C. Paine (1st season)
- Captain: Marshall Boyd
- Home stadium: State Field

1920 Missouri Valley Conference football standings
	Conf.					Overall
Team	W		L		T	W		L		T
Oklahoma $	4	–	0	–	1	6	–	0	–	1
Missouri	5	–	1	–	0	7	–	1	–	0
Kansas	3	–	2	–	0	5	–	2	–	1
Iowa State	3	–	2	–	0	4	–	4	–	0
Drake	1	–	3	–	1	4	–	5	–	1
Washington University	1	–	4	–	0	4	–	4	–	0
Grinnell	0	–	2	–	1	3	–	3	–	1
Kansas State	0	–	3	–	1	3	–	3	–	3
$ – Conference champion

The 1920 Iowa State Cyclones football team represented Iowa State College of Agricultural and Mechanic Arts (later renamed Iowa State University) in the Missouri Valley Conference during the 1920 college football season. In their first and only season under head coach Norman C. Paine, the Cyclones compiled a 4–4 record (3–2 against conference opponents), finished in fourth place in the conference, and outscored opponents by a combined total of 98 to 48. They played their home games at State Field in Ames, Iowa. Marshall Boyd was the team captain.

== Schedule ==
Date	Time	Opponent	Site	Result	Source
October 2		Coe*	State Field; Ames, IA	L 0–6	
October 9		at Grinnell	Grinnell, IA	W 28–0	
October 16		Missouri	State Field; Ames, IA (rivalry)	L 2–14	
October 23		at Kansas	McCook Field; Lawrence, KS	L 0–7	
October 30		Washington University	State Field; Ames, IA	W 24–7	
November 6		at Creighton*	Omaha, NE	W 17–0	
November 13		at Kansas State	Ahearn Field; Manhattan, KS (rivalry)	W 17–0	
November 20	2:30 pm	Iowa*^{†}	State Field; Ames, IA (rivalry)	L 10–14	
*Non-conference game; ^{†}Homecoming
