= 1917 Washington University Pikers football team =

American college football season

1917 Washington University Pikers football
- Conference: Missouri Valley Conference
- Record: 4–3 (1–2 MVC)
- Head coach: Dick Rutherford (1st season)
- Home stadium: Francis Field

1917 Missouri Valley Conference football standings
	Conf.					Overall
Team	W		L		T	W		L		T
Nebraska $	2	–	0	–	0	5	–	2	–	0
Kansas	3	–	1	–	0	6	–	2	–	0
Iowa State	3	–	1	–	0	5	–	2	–	0
Kansas State	2	–	2	–	0	6	–	2	–	0
Missouri	2	–	4	–	0	3	–	5	–	0
Washington University	1	–	2	–	0	4	–	3	–	0
Drake	0	–	3	–	0	0	–	5	–	2
$ – Conference champion

The 1917 Washington University Pikers football team represented Washington University in St. Louis as a member of the Missouri Valley Conference (MVC) during the 1917 college football season. Led by first-year Dick Rutherford, the Pikers compiled an overall record of 4–3 with a mark of 1–2 in conference play, placing sixth in the MVC. Washington University played home games at Francis Field in St. Louis.

== Schedule ==
Date	Time	Opponent	Site	Result	Attendance	Source
October 13		Lombard*	Francis Field; St. Louis, MO	W 26–14		
October 20		at Kansas State	Ahearn Field; Manhattan, KS	L 0–61		
October 27		Rose Polytechnic*	Francis Field; St. Louis, MO	W 7–0		
November 3		Missouri Mines*	Francis Field; St. Louis, MO	W 21–2		
November 10	2:30 p.m.	at Drake	Drake Stadium; Des Moines, IA	W 20–0		
November 17	3:00 p.m.	Missouri	Francis Field; St. Louis, MO	L 3–19	5,000–6,000	
November 29	2:30 p.m.	at Saint Louis*	Sportsman's Park; St. Louis, MO	L 0–13		
*Non-conference game
