= 1920 Missouri Tigers football team =

American college football season

1920 Missouri Tigers football
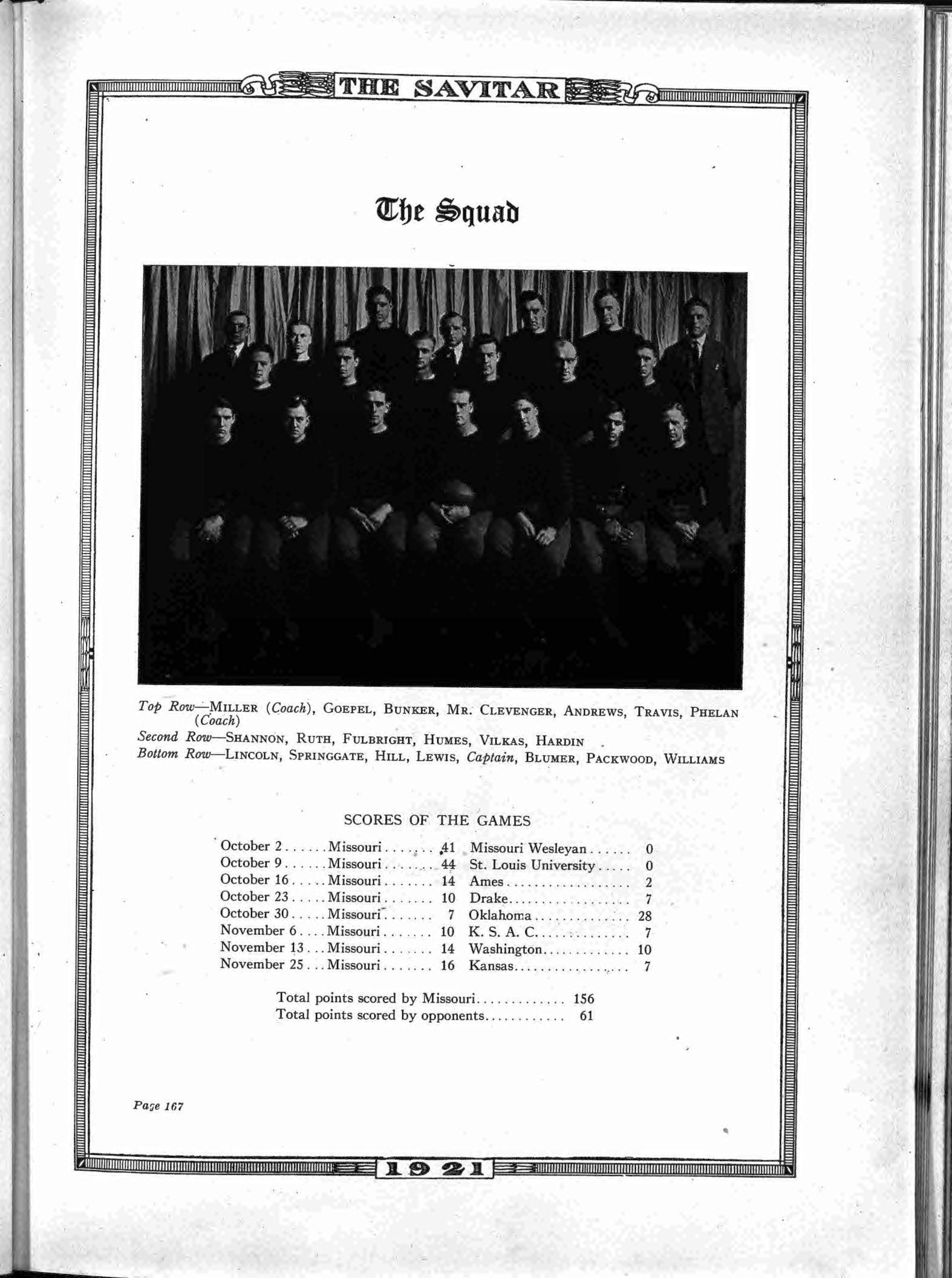
- Conference: Missouri Valley Conference
- Record: 7–1 (5–1 MVC)
- Head coach: James Phelan (1st season)
- Captain: Charles L. Lewis
- Home stadium: Rollins Field

1920 Missouri Valley Conference football standings
	Conf.					Overall
Team	W		L		T	W		L		T
Oklahoma $	4	–	0	–	1	6	–	0	–	1
Missouri	5	–	1	–	0	7	–	1	–	0
Kansas	3	–	2	–	0	5	–	2	–	1
Iowa State	3	–	2	–	0	4	–	4	–	0
Drake	1	–	3	–	1	4	–	5	–	1
Washington University	1	–	4	–	0	4	–	4	–	0
Grinnell	0	–	2	–	1	3	–	3	–	1
Kansas State	0	–	3	–	1	3	–	3	–	3
$ – Conference champion

The 1920 Missouri Tigers football team was an American football team that represented the University of Missouri in the Missouri Valley Conference (MVC) during the 1920 college football season. The team compiled a 7–1 record (5–1 against MVC opponents), finished in second place in the conference, and was outscored all opponents by a combined total of 156 to 61. James Phelan was the head coach for the first of two seasons. The team played its home games at Rollins Field in Columbia, Missouri.

== Schedule ==
Date	Opponent	Site	Result	Attendance	Source
October 2	Missouri Wesleyan*	Rollins Field; Columbia, MO	W 41–0		
October 9	at Saint Louis*	Sportsman's Park; St. Louis, MO	W 44–0	10,000	
October 16	at Iowa State	State Field; Ames, IA (rivalry)	W 14–2		
October 23	at Drake	Drake Stadium; Des Moines, IA	W 10–7		
October 30	Oklahoma	Rollins Field; Columbia, MO (rivalry)	L 7–28		
November 6	Kansas State	Rollins Field; Columbia, MO	W 10–7		
November 13	Washington University	Rollins Field; Columbia, MO	W 14–10		
November 25	Kansas	Rollins Field; Columbia, MO (rivalry)	W 16–7		
*Non-conference game
