= 1917 Missouri Tigers football team =

American college football season

1917 Missouri Tigers football
- Conference: Missouri Valley Conference
- Record: 3–5 (2–4 MVC)
- Head coach: Henry Schulte (4th season)
- Captain: Paul Hamilton
- Home stadium: Rollins Field

1917 Missouri Valley Conference football standings
	Conf.					Overall
Team	W		L		T	W		L		T
Nebraska $	2	–	0	–	0	5	–	2	–	0
Kansas	3	–	1	–	0	6	–	2	–	0
Iowa State	3	–	1	–	0	5	–	2	–	0
Kansas State	2	–	2	–	0	6	–	2	–	0
Missouri	2	–	4	–	0	3	–	5	–	0
Washington University	1	–	2	–	0	4	–	3	–	0
Drake	0	–	3	–	0	0	–	5	–	2
$ – Conference champion

The 1917 Missouri Tigers football team was an American football team that represented the University of Missouri in the Missouri Valley Conference (MVC) during the 1917 college football season. The team compiled a 3–5 record (2–4 against MVC opponents), finished in fifth place in the conference, and was outscored by all opponents by a combined total of 124 to 98. Henry Schulte was the head coach for the fourth of four seasons. The team played its home games at Rollins Field in Columbia, Missouri.

== Schedule ==
Date	Time	Opponent	Site	Result	Attendance	Source
October 6		William Jewell*	Rollins Field; Columbia, MO	W 14–6		
October 13		Kansas State	Rollins Field; Columbia, MO	L 6–7		
October 20		at Iowa State	State Field; Ames, IA (rivalry)	L 0–15		
October 27		Drake	Rollins Field; Columbia, MO	W 49–0		
November 3		Oklahoma*	Rollins Field; Columbia, MO (rivalry)	L 7–14		
November 10		at Nebraska	Nebraska Field; Lincoln, NE (rivalry)	L 0–52		
November 17	3:00 p.m.	at Washington University	Francis Field; St. Louis, MO	W 19–3	5,000–6,000	
November 29		Kansas	Rollins Field; Columbia, MO (rivalry)	L 3–27		
*Non-conference game
