= 1914 Missouri Tigers football team =

American college football season

1914 Missouri Tigers football
- Conference: Missouri Valley Conference
- Record: 5–3 (4–1 MVC)
- Head coach: Henry Schulte (1st season)
- Captain: James A. Clay
- Home stadium: Rollins Field

1914 Missouri Valley Conference football standings
	Conf.					Overall
Team	W		L		T	W		L		T
Nebraska $	3	–	0	–	0	7	–	0	–	1
Missouri	4	–	1	–	0	5	–	3	–	0
Iowa State	2	–	1	–	0	4	–	3	–	0
Kansas	2	–	2	–	0	5	–	2	–	1
Washington University	0	–	1	–	1	3	–	3	–	1
Drake	0	–	3	–	1	4	–	3	–	1
Kansas State	0	–	3	–	0	1	–	5	–	1
$ – Conference champion

The 1914 Missouri Tigers football team was an American football team that represented the University of Missouri in the Missouri Valley Conference (MVC) during the 1914 college football season. The team compiled a 5–3 record (4–1 against MVC opponents), finished in second place in the conference, and outscored all opponents by a combined total of 128 to 48. Henry Schulte was the head coach for the first of four seasons. The team played its home games at Rollins Field in Columbia, Missouri.

== Schedule ==
Date	Opponent	Site	Result	Source
October 3	Missouri Mines*	Rollins Field; Columbia, MO	L 0–9	
October 10	William Jewell*	Rollins Field; Columbia, MO	W 46–0	
October 17	at Oklahoma*	Boyd Field; Norman, OK (rivalry)	L 0–13	
October 24	Iowa State	Rollins Field; Columbia, MO (rivalry)	L 0–6	
October 31	Kansas State	Rollins Field; Columbia, MO	W 13–3	
November 7	at Drake	Des Moines, IA	W 33–7	
November 14	Washington University	Rollins Field; Columbia, MO	W 26–3	
November 21	Kansas	Rollins Field; Columbia, MO (rivalry)	W 10–7	
*Non-conference game
