= Harry Delamatre =

American football player and coach (1888–1951)

Biographical details
- Born: August 8, 1888; Omaha, Nebraska, U.S.
- Died: December 25, 1951 (aged 63); Omaha, Nebraska, U.S.
- Education: Nebraska (1915)

Playing career
- 1908: Cornell (IA)
- 1911–1914: Nebraska
- Positions: Center, fullback

Coaching career (HC unless noted)
- 1915–1916: Nebraska–Omaha

Head coaching record
- Overall: 2–11–1

Harry Clayton Delamatre (August 8, 1888 – December 25, 1951) was an American football player and coach. He served as the head football coach at the University of Nebraska–Omaha–then known as the University of Omaha–from 1915 to 1916, compiling a record of 2–11–1.

Delamatre was a 1915 graduate of the University of Nebraska–Lincoln, where he was a letter-winner on the undefeated 1914 Nebraska Cornhuskers football team.

== Head coaching record ==
Year	Team	Overall	Conference	Standing	Bowl/playoffs
Omaha Cardinals (Independent) (1915–1916)
1915	Omaha	1–4–1			
1916	Omaha	1–7			
Omaha:		2–11–1			
Total:		2–11–1			
