= 1914 Washington University Pikers football team =

American college football season

1914 Washington University Pikers football
- Conference: Missouri Valley Conference
- Record: 3–3–1 (0–1–1 MVC)
- Head coach: William P. Edmunds (2nd season)
- Captain: Boise Potthoff
- Home stadium: Francis Field

1914 Missouri Valley Conference football standings
	Conf.					Overall
Team	W		L		T	W		L		T
Nebraska $	3	–	0	–	0	7	–	0	–	1
Missouri	4	–	1	–	0	5	–	3	–	0
Iowa State	2	–	1	–	0	4	–	3	–	0
Kansas	2	–	2	–	0	5	–	2	–	1
Washington University	0	–	1	–	1	3	–	3	–	1
Drake	0	–	3	–	1	4	–	3	–	1
Kansas State	0	–	3	–	0	1	–	5	–	1
$ – Conference champion

The 1914 Washington University Pikers football team represented Washington University in St. Louis as a member of the Missouri Valley Conference (MVC) during the 1914 college football season. Led by second-year head coach William P. Edmunds, the Pikers compiled an overall record of 3–3–1 with a mark of 0–1–1 in conference play, placing fifth in the MVC. Washington University played home games at Francis Field in St. Louis.

== Schedule ==
Date	Time	Opponent	Site	Result	Attendance	Source
September 26	3:00 p.m.	Southern Illinois Normal	Francis Field; St. Louis, MO	W 66–0		
October 3	3:15 p.m.	Shurtleff*	Francis Field; St. Louis, MO	W 62–7		
October 17	3:15 p.m.	Missouri Mines*	Francis Field; St. Louis, MO	L 0–19	6,000	
October 24		at Drury*	Springfield, MO	L 26–28		
October 31	3:00 p.m.	Drake	Francis Field; St. Louis, MO	T 7–7		
November 7	3:05 p.m.	Saint Louis*	Francis Field; St. Louis, MO	W 6–0	10,000	
November 14		Missouri	Rollins Field; Columbia, MO	L 3–26		
*Non-conference game
