= 1920 Washington University Pikers football team =

American college football season

1920 Washington University Pikers football
- Conference: Missouri Valley Conference
- Record: 4–4 (1–4 MVC)
- Head coach: George Rider (1st season)
- Home stadium: Francis Field

1920 Missouri Valley Conference football standings
	Conf.					Overall
Team	W		L		T	W		L		T
Oklahoma $	4	–	0	–	1	6	–	0	–	1
Missouri	5	–	1	–	0	7	–	1	–	0
Kansas	3	–	2	–	0	5	–	2	–	1
Iowa State	3	–	2	–	0	4	–	4	–	0
Drake	1	–	3	–	1	4	–	5	–	1
Washington University	1	–	4	–	0	4	–	4	–	0
Grinnell	0	–	2	–	1	3	–	3	–	1
Kansas State	0	–	3	–	1	3	–	3	–	3
$ – Conference champion

The 1920 Washington University Pikers football team represented Washington University in St. Louis as a member of the Missouri Valley Conference (MVC) during the 1920 college football season. Led by first-year George Rider, the Pikers compiled an overall record of 4–4 with a mark of 1–4 in conference play, placing sixth in the MVC. Washington University played home games at Francis Field in St. Louis.

== Schedule ==
Date	Time	Opponent	Site	Result	Attendance	Source
October 2		Missouri Mines*	Francis Field; St. Louis, MO	W 21–0	4,000	
October 9		Drury*	Francis Field; St. Louis, MO	W 36–0		
October 16		at Grinnell	Grinnell, IA	W 23–14		
October 23	3:00 p.m.	Oklahoma	Francis Field; St. Louis, MO	L 14–24		
October 30		at Iowa State	State Field; Ames, IA	L 7–24		
November 6		Drake	Francis Field; St. Louis, MO	L 6–14		
November 13		at Missouri	Rollins Field; Columbia, MO	L 10–14		
November 25	2:00 p.m.	at Saint Louis*	Francis Field; St. Louis, MO	W 17–0	12,000	
*Non-conference game; All times are in Central time
