= 1914 Cincinnati Bearcats football team =

American college football season

1914 Cincinnati Bearcats football
- Conference: Ohio Athletic Conference
- Record: 6–3 (4–2 OAC)
- Head coach: George Little (1st season)
- Captain: L. K. Baehr
- Home stadium: Carson Field

1914 Ohio Athletic Conference football standings
	Conf.					Overall
Team	W		L		T	W		L		T
Denison $	5	–	1	–	0	7	–	1	–	0
Mount Union	4	–	1	–	0	6	–	4	–	0
Cincinnati	4	–	2	–	0	6	–	3	–	0
Miami (OH)	4	–	2	–	0	5	–	3	–	0
Ohio	3	–	3	–	0	4	–	4	–	0
Oberlin	3	–	4	–	0	4	–	4	–	0
Case	3	–	4	–	0	4	–	6	–	0
Kenyon	2	–	3	–	0	4	–	3	–	1
Western Reserve	2	–	4	–	0	4	–	6	–	0
Wooster	2	–	5	–	0	2	–	6	–	0
Ohio Wesleyan	2	–	6	–	0	3	–	7	–	0
Wittenberg	0	–	3	–	0	3	–	6	–	0
Ohio State *	3	–	0	–	0	5	–	2	–	0
$ – Conference champion; * – did not complete for championship

The 1914 Cincinnati Bearcats football team was an American football team that represented the University of Cincinnati as a member of the Ohio Athletic Conference during the 1914 college football season. In their first season under head coach George Little, the Bearcats compiled a 6–3 record (4–2 against conference opponents). L. K. Baehr was the team captain. The team played home games at Carson Field in Cincinnati.

== Schedule ==
Date	Opponent	Site	Result	Source
September 26	Georgetown (KY)*	Carson Field; Cincinnati, OH	W 35–0	
October 3	at Denison	Granville, OH	W 13–0	
October 10	at Ohio Wesleyan	Delaware, OH	L 7–14	
October 17	Kenyon	Carson Field; Cincinnati, OH	W 47–0	
October 31	Kentucky*	Carson Field; Cincinnati, OH	W 14–7	
November 7	Western Reserve	Carson Field; Cincinnati, OH	W 20–0	
November 14	Otterbein*	Carson Field; Cincinnati, OH	L 0–3	
November 21	Ohio	Carson Field; Cincinnati, OH	W 15–0	
November 27	Miami (OH)	Carson Field; Cincinnati, OH (Victory Bell)	L 13–20	
*Non-conference game
