= M. B. Banks =

American college coach and athletics administrator (1883–1970)

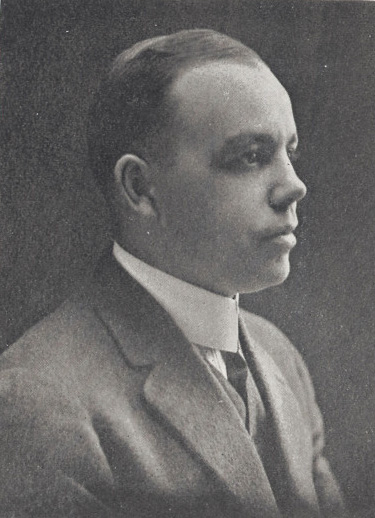
- Banks pictured in The Quax 1921, Drake yearbook

Biographical details
- Born: June 5, 1883; Breesport, New York, U.S.
- Died: January 12, 1970 (aged 86); Parkersburg, West Virginia, U.S.

Playing career

Football
- 1905–1908: Syracuse

Basketball
- 1908–1909: Syracuse

Baseball
- 1909: Syracuse
- Position: Quarterback (football)

Coaching career (HC unless noted)

Football
- 1909–1911: Central University
- 1912: Ohio Wesleyan
- 1913–1917: Ohio
- 1918–1920: Drake
- 1921–1925: Tennessee
- 1941–1948: Hartwick

Basketball
- 1912–1913: Ohio Wesleyan
- 1913–1918: Ohio
- 1918–1921: Drake
- 1921–1926: Tennessee
- 1941–1946: Hartwick

Baseball
- 1913: Ohio Wesleyan
- 1913–1918: Ohio
- 1919–1920: Drake
- 1921–1926: Tennessee

Administrative career (AD unless noted)
- 1941–1950: Hartwick

Head coaching record
- Overall: 100–73–10 (football); 146–137–1 (basketball); 100–78–4 (baseball)

Mark Beal Banks (June 5, 1883 – January 12, 1970) was an American football, basketball and baseball player, coach, and college athletics administrator. He served as the head football coach at Central University of Kentucky—now known as Centre College—in Danville, Kentucky (1909–1911), Ohio Wesleyan University (1912), Ohio University (1913–1917), Drake University (1918–1920), the University of Tennessee (1921–1925), and Hartwick College (1941–1948), compiling a career college football record of 100–73–10. Banks was also the head basketball and head baseball coach at Ohio Wesleyan, Ohio, Drake, and Tennessee. He played football, basketball, and baseball at Syracuse University.

== College career ==
Banks graduated from Syracuse University in 1909. There he lettered in football (1905–1908), basketball (1908–1909), and baseball (1909). Banks was an Honorable Mention All-American quarterback in 1908.

== Coaching career ==
Banks started his coaching career at Centre College in Danville, Kentucky, in 1909. In 1912, Banks was head football coach at Ohio Wesleyan University in Delaware, Ohio, compiling a record of 3–6 in his only season there. Banks then move to Ohio University in Athens, Ohio, in 1913 and coached football five seasons there, going 21–18–2.

Banks became the 12th head football coach at Drake University located in Des Moines, Iowa, and he held that position for three seasons, from 1918 until 1920. His overall coaching record at Drake was 11–10–1. During his time at Drake, he was also the meet director for the (track and field) Drake Relays.

After coaching at Drake, Banks led the Tennessee Volunteers football team to a 27–15–3 record from 1921 to 1925. He was the football coach at Tennessee when the iconic orange became the main color for Tennessee's athletic teams. Banks also coached baseball and basketball at Tennessee. In 1927, Banks left for Central High School in Knoxville. Banks coached at Knoxville Central from 1927 to 1930.

In 1941, Banks became the athletic director, basketball, football, and baseball coach at Hartwick College in Oneonta, New York. Under Banks, Hartwick's football team had their first two winning seasons. Banks coached at Hartwick until 1948 and remained athletic director at the school until his retirement in 1950.

In 1996, Banks was inducted into the Hartwick College Athletic Hall of Fame. The M. Beal (Pops) Banks Award at Hartwick is awarded annually to "individuals, male and female, who have best pursued excellence in their sport to the best of their ability and have enthused others with their dedication and commitment".

== Family ==
Banks was born on June 5, 1883, in Breesport, New York, to parents David Thomas Banks (December 6, 1851, in Veteran, New York – December 3, 1930 in Elmira, New York) and Emeline H. Parsons (December 25, 1852, in Catlin, New York – May 3, 1938, in Elmira, New York). Before attending Syracuse, Beal Banks graduated high school from the Elmira Free Academy in Elmira, New York. He married Gladys King (March 1888 – 1966) daughter of Rufus Everson King (July 15, 1859 – November 7, 1921) and Clara E. Ingersoll (June 1860 – ?) on October 29, 1910. Beal and Gladys had four children. Banks died January 12, 1970, in Parkersburg, West Virginia, of a heart attack.

== Head coaching record ==
=== Football ===
Year	Team	Overall	Conference	Standing	Bowl/playoffs
Central University (Independent) (1909–1910)
1909	Central University	6–1–1			
1910	Central University	9–0			
Central University (Southern Intercollegiate Athletic Association) (1911)
1911	Central University	3–2–1	0–2–1	T–16th	
Central University:		18–3–2	0–2–1		
Ohio Wesleyan (Ohio Athletic Conference) (1912)
1912	Ohio Wesleyan	3–6	2–5	9th	
Ohio Wesleyan:		3–6	2–5		
Ohio Green and White (Ohio Athletic Conference) (1913–1917)
1913	Ohio	2–5–1	1–3	10th	
1914	Ohio	4–4	4–3	5th	
1915	Ohio	8–1	2–1	T–4th	
1916	Ohio	5–2–1	4–1–1	4th	
1917	Ohio	3–5	3–3	T–6th	
Ohio:		22–17–2	14–11–1		
Drake Bulldogs (Missouri Valley Conference) (1918–1920)
1918	Drake	3–2	0–0	7th	
1919	Drake	4–3	2–2	3rd	
1920	Drake	4–5–1	1–3–1	5th	
Drake:		11–10–1	3–5–1		
Tennessee Volunteers (Southern Intercollegiate Athletic Association) (1921)
1921	Tennessee	6–2–1	4–1–1	6th	
Tennessee Volunteers (Southern Conference) (1922–1925)
1922	Tennessee	8–2	3–2	T–6th	
1923	Tennessee	5–4–1	4–3	10th	
1924	Tennessee	3–5	0–4	22nd	
1925	Tennessee	5–2–1	2–2–1	T–10th	
Tennessee:		27–15–3	13–12–2		
Hartwick Hawks (Independent) (1941–1948)
1941	Hartwick	4–4–1			
1942	Hartwick	1–5–1			
1943	No team—World War II				
1944	No team—World War II				
1945	No team—World War II				
1946	Hartwick	6–2			
1947	Hartwick	5–4			
1948	Hartwick	3–5			
Hartwick:		19–20–2			
Total:		100–73–10			
