= Henry Schulte =

American football player and sports coach (1879–1944)

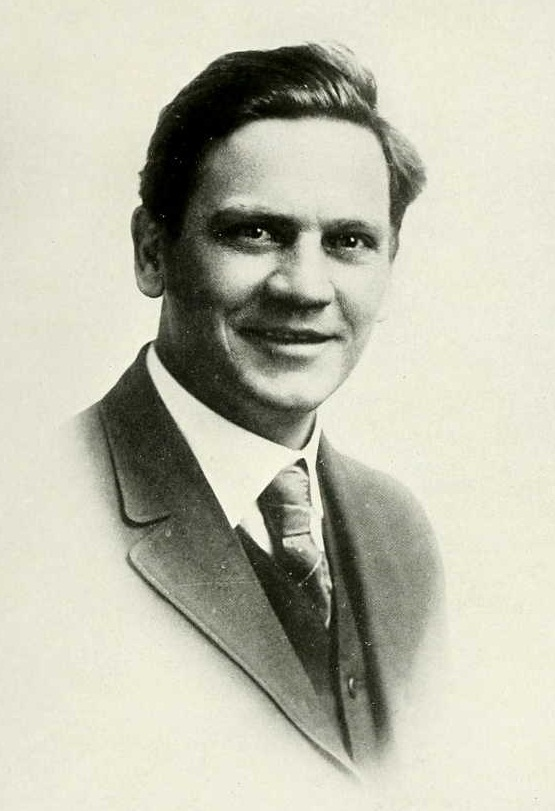

Biographical details
- Born: February 4, 1879; St. Louis County, Missouri, U.S.
- Died: October 18, 1944 (aged 65); Lincoln, Nebraska, U.S.

Playing career

Football
- 1898–1900: Washington University
- 1903–1905: Michigan
- Positions: Guard, center

Coaching career (HC unless noted)

Football
- 1906–1908: Michigan State Normal
- 1909–1911: Cape Girardeau Normal
- 1912: Michigan (assistant)
- 1913: Missouri (assistant)
- 1914–1918: Missouri
- 1919–1920: Nebraska
- 1922–1927: Nebraska (assistant)

Basketball
- 1909–1912: Cape Girardeau Normal

Baseball
- 1907–1908: Michigan State Normal

Track and field
- 1906–1908: Michigan State Normal
- 1913: Missouri (assistant)
- 1914–1919: Missouri
- 1920–1938: Nebraska

Head coaching record
- Overall: 41–29–6 (football)

Accomplishments and honors

Awards
- Second-team All-American (1905); First-team All-Western (1905)

Henry Frank Schulte (February 4, 1879 – October 18, 1944) was an American football player and coach of football, basketball, baseball, and track and field. Schulte played football at Washington University in St. Louis from 1898 to 1900 and at the University of Michigan from 1903 to 1905 and later coached football and track and field at Eastern Michigan University (1906–1908), Southeast Missouri State University (1909–1911), University of Missouri (1914–1919), and University of Nebraska (1919–1938). Schulte was often referred to by the nickname "Indian" Schulte, though he was of German rather than Native American descent.

== Biography ==
=== Early years ===
Schulte was born in 1879 in St. Louis County, Missouri.

=== Football player ===
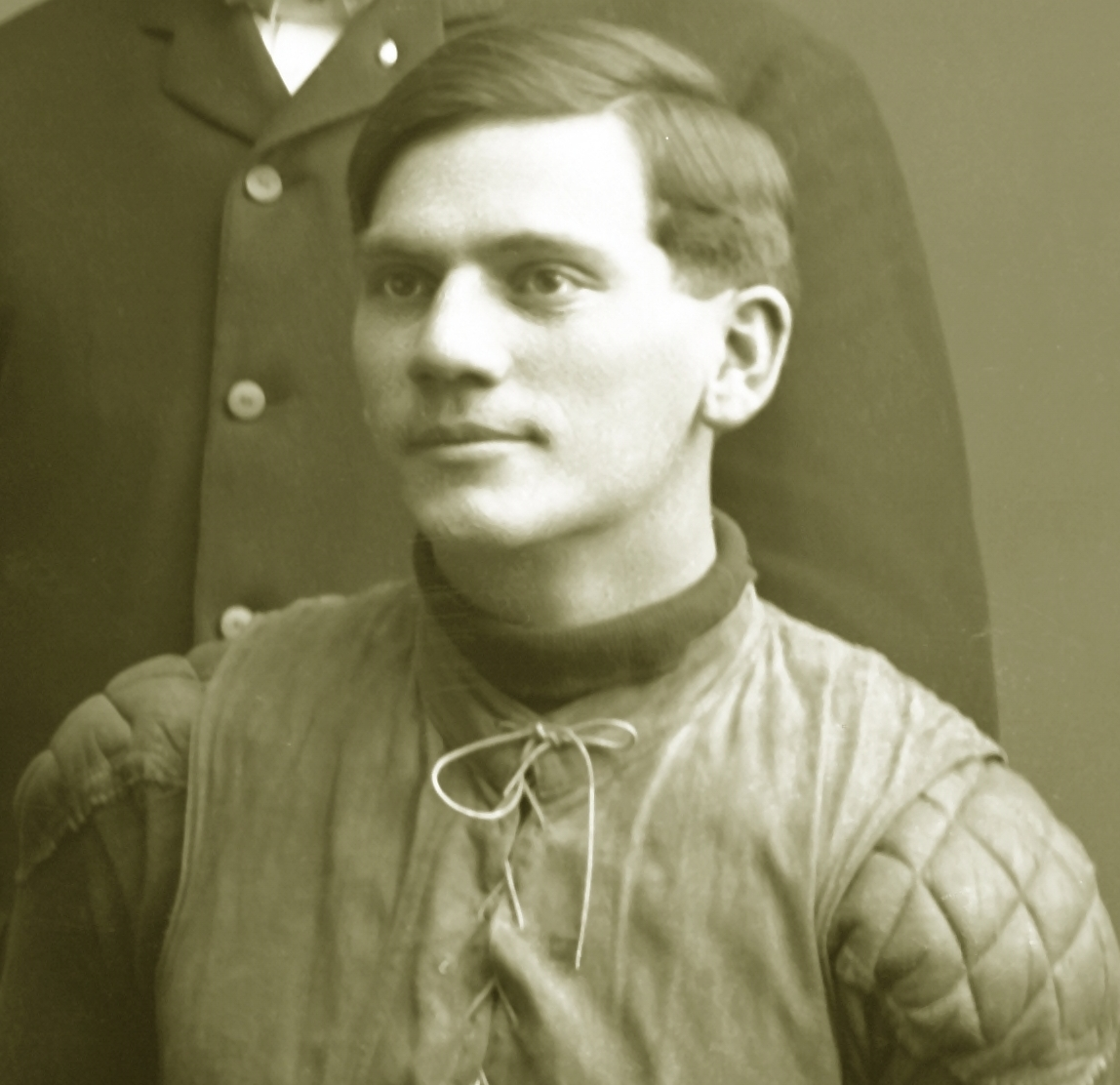
Schulte at Michigan

Schulte played football at Smith Academy in St. Louis and then at Washington University in St. Louis. Charges of not being a bona fide student were lobbied against Schulte in 1900 by Missouri School of Mines and by C. B. C., leading to the expulsion of the Washington University manager.

In 1903, Schulte transferred to the University of Michigan where he played at the guard and center positions for Fielding H. Yost's famous "Point-a-Minute" teams of 1903, 1904, and 1905, which compiled a record of 33–1–1 over the three years Schulte was a starter. In late 1905 and early 1906, charges of professionalism were leveled at the major college football programs, including Michigan, leading to calls for reform or even elimination of the sport from college campuses. In response to the controversy, the faculty at Michigan ruled Schulte and two other football players, Germany Schulz and Walter Rheinschild, academically ineligible. As a result, Schulte missed the 1906 season.

=== Football and track coach ===
In his senior year at Michigan, Schulte began a long career in coaching as the track coach at Michigan State Normal College (now Eastern Michigan University). From 1906 to 1908, Schulte served as coach of the football, baseball and track teams at Eastern Michigan University. In three years as Eastern Michigan's football coach, Schulte compiled a 9–6–1 record.

From 1909 to 1911, Schulte coached at Missouri State Normal–Third District (Cape Girardeau), compiling a 8–3 record. He was also an assistant coach to Fielding Yost for the 1912 Michigan Wolverines football team.

From 1914 to 1919, Schulte coached football and track and field at Missouri. In three years as coach of the football team (1914–1917), he compiled a 16–14–2 record. The track athletes he coached at Missouri included Jackson Scholz and Bob Simpson. A newspaper profile of Schulte in 1917 noted his contributions to the Missouri athletic program:

"Missouri hardly can afford to let 'Indian' Schulte, the football and track coach, leave the athletic department of the university, Schulte has had splendid success at Missouri. He has turned out well coached football teams and highly successful track teams. He has given Missouri in a coaching way what C. L. Brewer has supplied in the way of careful management and the upbuilding of a fine athletic plant. Schulte, an impulsive, impetuous fellow, is beloved of his boys. He has done much for Missouri athletics. He is entitled to the best Missouri can give him."

From 1919 to 1920, he was the head football coach at Nebraska, where he compiled an 8–6–3 record. He also served as the school's track coach from 1919 to 1938, and was an assistant coach for the football team from 1922 to 1927. One newspaper columnist noted that "his work with the big, sturdy plainsmen of the Cornhusker state largely was responsible for the name the school built for itself." Schulte was credited with building great football lines for Nebraska, including his years as an assistant coach; Notre Dame coach Knute Rockne frequently mentioned Schulte as "the greatest line coach in the game." In 20 years as the Cornhuskers' track coach, Schulte coached his teams to 15 conference titles. Schulte also served as a coach on the U.S. track team at the 1928 Summer Olympics. At Nebraska, the track athletes coached by Schulte included Ed Weir, John "Choppy" Rhodes, Hugh Rhea, Sam Francis and Lloyd Cardwell.

In later years, Schulte served as an instructor at coaching schools. In 1934, Schulte taught track coaching at a program in which Fritz Crisler also taught football coaching. A newspaper story on the coaching school reflected the popularity of Schulte's classes:

"Henry 'Indian' Schulte, University of Nebraska, concluded his track and field work yesterday, and was given a rousing send-off by the 200 or more coaches who have been attending his lectures. It was the opinion of numerous coaches yesterday that the Texas Tech coaching school authorities would do well to sign Schulte immediately for another course next year. ... One of the most popular lecturers to appear here, Schulte, who is getting along in years but younger in ideas and thought, has had almost as large a following as any football coach on the staff."

=== Family, death and tributes ===
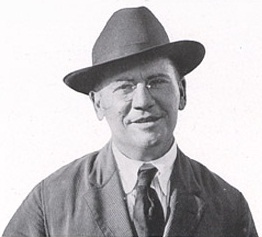
Schulte at Nebraska, 1922

In 1939, Schulte resigned as Nebraska's track coach due to illness. After several years of illness, Schulte died at Lincoln, Nebraska in October 1944 at age 65. In its obituary for Schulte, the Associated Press referred to Schulte as the "grand old man" of the University of Nebraska track teams.

Schulte was married to Neva Schulte, born in 1889 in Marcellus, Michigan. They had a son, Henry A. Schulte, born in Lincoln, Nebraska, in 1924.

When Nebraska completed a new athletic field house in 1946, it was named Schulte Fieldhouse in his honor. Schulte Fieldhouse was demolished to make room for the Tom and Nancy Osborne Athletic Complex, which was completed in 2006.

== Head coaching record ==
=== Football ===
Year	Team	Overall	Conference	Standing	Bowl/playoffs
Michigan State Normal Normalites (Michigan Intercollegiate Athletic Association) (1906–1908)
1906	Michigan State Normal	5–0–1	1–0		
1907	Michigan State Normal	3–2	0–1		
1908	Michigan State Normal	1–4	0–3		
Michigan State Normal:		9–6–1	1–4		
Cape Girardeau Normal (Independent) (1909–1911)
1909	Cape Girardeau Normal	3–0 (Note: Schulte was recovering from a leg injury and did not coach the team in its 38–6 defeat to Saint Louis on October 16.)			
1910	Cape Girardeau Normal	3–1 (Note: The Cape Girardeau Normals went 3–1 in 1910.)			
1911	Cape Girardeau Normal	2–2			
Cape Girardeau Normal:		8–3			
Missouri Tigers (Missouri Valley Intercollegiate Athletic Association) (1914–1917)
1914	Missouri	5–3	4–1	2nd	
1915	Missouri	2–5–1	1–3–1	5th	
1916	Missouri	6–1–1	3–1–1	2nd	
1917	Missouri	3–5	2–4	5th	
Missouri:		16–14–2	10–9–2		
Nebraska Cornhuskers (Independent) (1919–1920)
1919	Nebraska	3–3–2			
1920	Nebraska	5–3–1			
Nebraska:		8–6–3			
Total:		41–29–6			
