= 1914 Purdue Boilermakers football team =

American college football season

1914 Purdue Boilermakers football
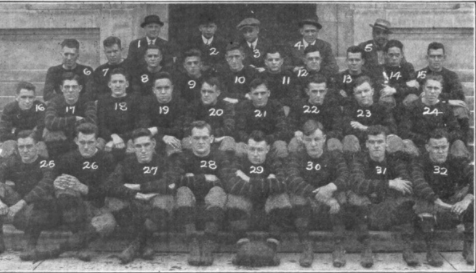
- Conference: Western Conference
- Record: 5–2 (2–2 Western)
- Head coach: Andy Smith (2nd season)
- Captain: Herbert S. O'Brien
- Home stadium: Stuart Field

1914 Western Conference football standings
	Conf.					Overall
Team	W		L		T	W		L		T
Illinois $	6	–	0	–	0	7	–	0	–	0
Minnesota	3	–	1	–	0	6	–	1	–	0
Chicago	4	–	2	–	1	4	–	2	–	1
Wisconsin	2	–	2	–	1	4	–	2	–	1
Ohio State	2	–	2	–	0	5	–	2	–	0
Purdue	2	–	2	–	0	5	–	2	–	0
Iowa	1	–	2	–	0	4	–	3	–	0
Indiana	1	–	4	–	0	3	–	4	–	0
Northwestern	0	–	6	–	0	1	–	6	–	0
$ – Conference champion

The 1914 Purdue Boilermakers football team was an American football team that represented Purdue University during the 1914 college football season. In their second season under head coach Andy Smith, the Boilermakers compiled a 5–2 record, finished in a tie for fifth place in the Western Conference with a 2–2 record against conference opponents, and outscored their opponents by a total of 157 to 73. Herbert S. O'Brien was the team captain.

== Schedule ==
Date	Opponent	Site	Result	Source
October 3	Wabash*	Stuart Field; West Lafayette, IN	W 27–3	
October 10	Western Reserve*	Stuart Field; West Lafayette, IN	W 26–0	
October 17	at Wisconsin	Randall Field; Madison, WI	L 7–14	
October 24	at Chicago	Stagg Field; Chicago, IL (rivalry)	L 0–21	
November 7	Kentucky*	Stuart Field; West Lafayette, IN	W 40–6	
November 14	at Northwestern	Northwestern Field; Evanston, IL	W 34–6	
November 21	Indiana	Stuart Field; West Lafayette, IN (Old Oaken Bucket)	W 23–13	
*Non-conference game

== Roster ==
- R. T. Abrell, HB
- Kenneth Bishop, G
- Frank Blocker, T
- Cecil Borum, T
- R. R. Bozell, HB
- Charlie Buechner, T
- Clarence Cecil, G
- Charles East, FB
- A. A. Eldridge, E
- J. R. Finn, QB
- Paul Hake, E
- Paul Mason, G
- C. Montgomery, E
- Herbert O'Brien, FB
- V. T. Oxen, FB
- C. C. Pults, QB
- A. S. Rakestraw, E
- H. B. Routh, G
- Mike Stinchfield, E
- U. V. Turner, E
- Warner Van Aken, HB
