= 1914 Kansas Jayhawks football team =

American college football season

1914 Kansas Jayhawks football
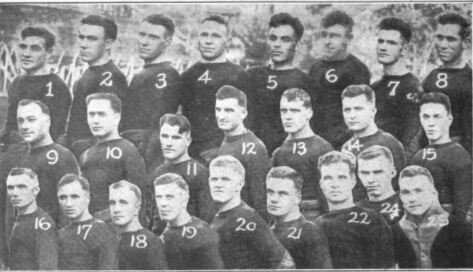
- Conference: Missouri Valley Conference
- Record: 5–2–1 (2–2 MVC)
- Head coach: H. M. Wheaton (1st season)
- Captain: John Detwiler
- Home stadium: McCook Field

1914 Missouri Valley Conference football standings
	Conf.					Overall
Team	W		L		T	W		L		T
Nebraska $	3	–	0	–	0	7	–	0	–	1
Missouri	4	–	1	–	0	5	–	3	–	0
Iowa State	2	–	1	–	0	4	–	3	–	0
Kansas	2	–	2	–	0	5	–	2	–	1
Washington University	0	–	1	–	1	3	–	3	–	1
Drake	0	–	3	–	1	4	–	3	–	1
Kansas State	0	–	3	–	0	1	–	5	–	1
$ – Conference champion

The 1914 Kansas Jayhawks football team was an American football team that represented the University of Kansas as a member of the Missouri Valley Conference (MVC) during the 1914 college football season. In their first and only season under head coach H. M. Wheaton, the Jayhawks compiled a 5–2–1 record (2–2 against conference opponents), finished in fourth place in the MVC, and outscored opponents by a total of 158 to 84. The Jayhawks played their home games at McCook Field in Lawrence, Kansas. John Detwiler was the team captain.

== Schedule ==
Date	Opponent	Site	Result	Attendance	Source
October 3	William Jewell*	McCook Field; Lawrence, KS	W 48–2		
October 10	College of Emporia*	McCook Field; Lawrence, KS	W 7–0		
October 17	at Drake	Des Moines, IA	W 32–7		
October 24	Kansas State	McCook Field; Lawrence, KS (rivalry)	W 27–0		
October 31	Oklahoma*	McCook Field; Lawrence, KS	T 16–16	4,000	
November 7	at Washburn*	Topeka, KS	W 20–14		
November 14	at Nebraska	Nebraska Field; Lincoln, NE (rivalry)	L 0–35		
November 21	Missouri	McCook Field; Lawrence, KS (rivalry)	L 7–10		
*Non-conference game
