= 1920 Drake Bulldogs football team =

American college football season

1920 Drake Bulldogs football
- Conference: Missouri Valley Conference
- Record: 4–5–1 (1–3–1 MVC)
- Head coach: M. B. Banks (3rd season)
- Home stadium: Drake Stadium

1920 Missouri Valley Conference football standings
	Conf.					Overall
Team	W		L		T	W		L		T
Oklahoma $	4	–	0	–	1	6	–	0	–	1
Missouri	5	–	1	–	0	7	–	1	–	0
Kansas	3	–	2	–	0	5	–	2	–	1
Iowa State	3	–	2	–	0	4	–	4	–	0
Drake	1	–	3	–	1	4	–	5	–	1
Washington University	1	–	4	–	0	4	–	4	–	0
Grinnell	0	–	2	–	1	3	–	3	–	1
Kansas State	0	–	3	–	1	3	–	3	–	3
$ – Conference champion

The 1920 Drake Bulldogs football team was an American football team that represented Drake University as a member of the Missouri Valley Conference (MVC) during the 1920 college football season. In its third and final season under head coach M. B. Banks, the team compiled a 4–5–1 record (1–3–1 against MVC opponents), finished fifth in the conference, and outscored opponents by a total of 149 to 40.

== Schedule ==
Date	Opponent	Site	Result	Attendance	Source
September 25	at Penn (IA)*	Oskaloosa, IA	W 54–0		
October 2	Simpson*	Drake Stadium; Des Moines, IA	W 66–0		
October 9	at Illinois*	Illinois Field; Champaign, IL	L 0–41	4,435	
October 16	at Kansas	McCook Field; Lawrence, KS	L 3–7		
October 23	Missouri	Drake Stadium; Des Moines, IA	L 7–10		
October 30	at Grinnell	Grinnell, IA	T 6–6		
November 6	at Washington University	Francis Field; St. Louis, MO	W 14–6		
November 13	at Creighton*	Omaha, NE	W 7–0		
November 20	at Morningside*	Sioux City, IA	L 6–14		
November 25	at Oklahoma	Boyd Field; Norman, OK	L 7–44		
*Non-conference game
