= 1917 Nebraska Cornhuskers football team =

American college football season

1917 Nebraska Cornhuskers football

MVC champion
- Conference: Missouri Valley Conference
- Record: 5–2 (2–0 MVC)
- Head coach: E. J. Stewart (2nd season)
- Home stadium: Nebraska Field

1917 Missouri Valley Conference football standings
	Conf.					Overall
Team	W		L		T	W		L		T
Nebraska $	2	–	0	–	0	5	–	2	–	0
Kansas	3	–	1	–	0	6	–	2	–	0
Iowa State	3	–	1	–	0	5	–	2	–	0
Kansas State	2	–	2	–	0	6	–	2	–	0
Missouri	2	–	4	–	0	3	–	5	–	0
Washington University	1	–	2	–	0	4	–	3	–	0
Drake	0	–	3	–	0	0	–	5	–	2
$ – Conference champion

The 1917 Nebraska Cornhuskers football team represented the University of Nebraska in the 1917 college football season. The team was coached by second-year head coach E. J. Stewart and played its home games at Nebraska Field in Lincoln, Nebraska. They competed as members of the Missouri Valley Conference, which NU won for the eighth consecutive season.

Stewart departed the football program after the season to assist in the war effort as the United States drew closer to involvement in World War I, spending time at the YMCA preparing young men to serve in the armed forces. Stewart remained NU's basketball coach and athletic director until 1919.

== Schedule ==
Date	Time	Opponent	Site	Result	Attendance
October 6	2:30 p.m.	Nebraska Wesleyan*	Nebraska Field; Lincoln, NE	W 100–0	
October 13	2:30 p.m.	Iowa*	Nebraska Field; Lincoln, NE (rivalry)	W 47–0	
October 20	2:30 p.m.	Notre Dame*	Nebraska Field; Lincoln, NE (rivalry)	W 7–0	
October 27	2:30 p.m.	at Michigan*	Ferry Field; Ann Arbor, MI	L 0–2	5,022
November 10	2:30 p.m.	Missouri^{†}	Nebraska Field; Lincoln, NE (rivalry)	W 52–0	
November 17	2:00 p.m.	at Kansas	McCook Field; Lawrence, KS (rivalry)	W 13–3	
November 29	2:30 p.m.	Syracuse*	Nebraska Field; Lincoln, NE	L 9–10	10,000
*Non-conference game; ^{†}Homecoming

== Coaching staff ==
Coach	Position	First year	Alma mater
E. J. Stewart	Head coach	1916	Mount Union
Jack Best	Trainer	1890	Nebraska

== Roster ==
Cook, John QB
Day, William C
Dobson, Paul HB
DuTeau, Al E
Henry, Stanley C
Hubka, Ernest FB
Kellogg, Sam T
Kositsky, Ed T
Kriemelmeyer, Walter T
McMahon, Harold HB
Munn, Wayne G
Otopalik, Hugo HB
Rhodes, Roscoe E
Riddell, Ted E
Schellenberg, Elmer HB
Shaw, Edson T
Shaw, Lawrence T
Teter, John G
White, Herbert PLAYER
White, Roland PLAYER
Wilder, Harold T
Young, Farley G

== Game summaries ==
=== Nebraska Wesleyan ===
Nebraska Wesleyan at Nebraska

Team	1	2	Total
Nebraska Wesleyan			0
• Nebraska			100

- Date: October 6
- Location: Nebraska Field, Lincoln, NE

This was the fourth and final time Nebraska scored 100 or more points.

=== Iowa ===
Iowa at Nebraska

Team	1	2	Total
Iowa			0
• Nebraska			47

- Date: October 13
- Location: Nebraska Field, Lincoln, NE

=== Notre Dame ===
Notre Dame at Nebraska

Team	1	2	3	4	Total
Notre Dame	0	0	0	0	0
• Nebraska	0	7	0	0	7

- Date: October 20
- Location: Nebraska Field, Lincoln, NE

The Irish's longest drive ended with an interception at the Nebraska 8-yard line. Among the Notre Dame players present was future College Football Hall of Fame inductee George Gipp, who was handed his first career loss at Notre Dame.

=== At Michigan ===
Nebraska at Michigan

Team	1	2	Total
Nebraska			0
• Michigan			20

- Date: October 27
- Location: Ferry Field, Ann Arbor, MI

=== Missouri ===
Missouri at Nebraska

Team	1	2	Total
Missouri			0
• Nebraska			52

- Date: November 10
- Location: Nebraska Field, Lincoln, NE

=== Kansas ===
Nebraska at Kansas

Team	1	2	Total
• Nebraska			13
Kansas			3

- Date: November 17
- Location: McCook Field, Lawrence, KS

=== Syracuse ===
Syracuse at Nebraska

Team	1	2	Total
• Syracuse			10
Nebraska			9

- Date: November 29
- Location: Nebraska Field, Lincoln, NE
