= 1917 Iowa State Cyclones football team =

American college football season

1917 Iowa State Cyclones football
- Conference: Missouri Valley Conference
- Record: 5–2 (3–1 MVC)
- Head coach: Charles Mayser (3rd season)
- Captain: Howard Aldrich
- Home stadium: State Field

1917 Missouri Valley Conference football standings
	Conf.					Overall
Team	W		L		T	W		L		T
Nebraska $	2	–	0	–	0	5	–	2	–	0
Kansas	3	–	1	–	0	6	–	2	–	0
Iowa State	3	–	1	–	0	5	–	2	–	0
Kansas State	2	–	2	–	0	6	–	2	–	0
Missouri	2	–	4	–	0	3	–	5	–	0
Washington University	1	–	2	–	0	4	–	3	–	0
Drake	0	–	3	–	0	0	–	5	–	2
$ – Conference champion

The 1917 Iowa State Cyclones football team represented Iowa State College of Agricultural and Mechanic Arts (later renamed Iowa State University) in the Missouri Valley Conference during the 1917 college football season. In their third season under head coach Charles Mayser, the Cyclones compiled a 5–2 record (3–1 against conference opponents), finished in third place in the conference, shut out four of seven opponents, and outscored opponents by a combined total of 129 to 20. They played their home games at State Field in Ames, Iowa. Howard Aldrich was the team captain.

== Schedule ==
Date	Opponent	Site	Result
September 29	Simpson*	State Field; Ames, IA	W 47–0
October 6	Coe*	State Field; Ames, IA	W 7–0
October 20	Missouri	State Field; Ames, IA (rivalry)	W 15–0
October 27	at Kansas	McCook Field; Lawrence, KS	L 0–7
November 10	Kansas State^{†}	State Field; Ames, IA (rivalry)	W 10–7
November 24	at Iowa*	Iowa Field; Iowa City, IA (rivalry)	L 3–6
November 29	at Drake	Drake Stadium; Des Moines, IA	W 47–0
*Non-conference game; ^{†}Homecoming
