= 1914 Ohio Green and White football team =

American college football season

1914 Ohio Green and White football
- Conference: Ohio Athletic Conference
- Record: 4–4 (3–3 OAC)
- Head coach: M. B. Banks (2nd season)

1914 Ohio Athletic Conference football standings
	Conf.					Overall
Team	W		L		T	W		L		T
Denison $	5	–	1	–	0	7	–	1	–	0
Mount Union	4	–	1	–	0	6	–	4	–	0
Cincinnati	4	–	2	–	0	6	–	3	–	0
Miami (OH)	4	–	2	–	0	5	–	3	–	0
Ohio	3	–	3	–	0	4	–	4	–	0
Oberlin	3	–	4	–	0	4	–	4	–	0
Case	3	–	4	–	0	4	–	6	–	0
Kenyon	2	–	3	–	0	4	–	3	–	1
Western Reserve	2	–	4	–	0	4	–	6	–	0
Wooster	2	–	5	–	0	2	–	6	–	0
Ohio Wesleyan	2	–	6	–	0	3	–	7	–	0
Wittenberg	0	–	3	–	0	3	–	6	–	0
Ohio State *	3	–	0	–	0	5	–	2	–	0
$ – Conference champion; * – did not complete for championship

The 1914 Ohio Green and White football team represented Ohio University as a member of the Ohio Athletic Conference (OAC) during the 1914 college football season. Led by second-year head coach M. B. Banks, the Green and White compiled an overall record of 4–4 with a mark of 3–3 in conference play.

== Schedule ==
Date	Opponent	Site	Result	Source
October 3	Otterbein*	Athens, OH	W 36–0	
October 10	Miami (OH)	Athens, OH (rivalry)	W 6–0	
October 17	at Denison	Granville, OH	L 0–20	
October 23	at Wittenberg	Springfield, OH	W 16–7	
October 31	Marietta*	Athens, OH	L 19–23	
November 7	Wooster	Athens, OH	W 36–6	
November 14	at Mount Union	Alliance, OH	L 6–28	
November 21	at Cincinnati	Carson Field; Cincinnati, OH	L 0–15	
*Non-conference game
