= 1914 Iowa State Cyclones football team =

American college football season

1914 Iowa State Cyclones football
- Conference: Missouri Valley Conference
- Record: 4–3 (2–1 MVC)
- Head coach: Homer C. Hubbard (2nd season)
- Captain: Lew Reeve
- Home stadium: State Field

1914 Missouri Valley Conference football standings
	Conf.					Overall
Team	W		L		T	W		L		T
Nebraska $	3	–	0	–	0	7	–	0	–	1
Missouri	4	–	1	–	0	5	–	3	–	0
Iowa State	2	–	1	–	0	4	–	3	–	0
Kansas	2	–	2	–	0	5	–	2	–	1
Washington University	0	–	1	–	1	3	–	3	–	1
Drake	0	–	3	–	1	4	–	3	–	1
Kansas State	0	–	3	–	0	1	–	5	–	1
$ – Conference champion

The 1914 Iowa State Cyclones football team represented Iowa State College of Agricultural and Mechanic Arts (later renamed Iowa State University) in the Missouri Valley Conference during the 1914 college football season. In their second and final season under head coach Homer C. Hubbard, the Cyclones compiled a 4–3 record (2–1 against conference opponents), finished in third place in the conference, and outscored opponents by a combined total of 167 to 78. Lew Reeve was the team captain.

== Schedule ==
Date	Opponent	Site	Result	Attendance	Source
October 3	Coe*	State Field; Ames, IA	W 27–6		
October 10	at Minnesota*	Northrop Field; Minneapolis, MN	L 0–26	3,000	
October 24	at Missouri	Rollins Field; Columbia, MO (rivalry)	W 6–0		
October 31	at Nebraska	Nebraska Field; Lincoln, NE (rivalry)	L 7–20		
November 7	Cornell (IA)*	State Field; Ames, IA	W 69–0		
November 14	Iowa*^{†}	State Field; Ames, IA (rivalry)	L 6–26		
November 21	at Drake	Drake Stadium; Des Moines, IA	W 52–0		
*Non-conference game; ^{†}Homecoming
