= 1913 Ohio Green and White football team =

American college football season

1913 Ohio Green and White football
- Conference: Ohio Athletic Conference
- Record: 2–5–1 (1–3 OAC)
- Head coach: M. B. Banks (1st season)

1913 Ohio Athletic Conference football standings
	Conf.					Overall
Team	W		L		T	W		L		T
Oberlin $	5	–	0	–	1	6	–	1	–	1
Ohio State	3	–	0	–	1	4	–	2	–	1
Denison	4	–	1	–	0	5	–	2	–	0
Miami (OH)	4	–	2	–	0	6	–	2	–	0
Cincinnati	4	–	2	–	1	5	–	3	–	1
Western Reserve	3	–	2	–	1	4	–	4	–	1
Case	3	–	3	–	0	4	–	5	–	0
Kenyon	1	–	3	–	1	5	–	3	–	1
Wooster	1	–	3	–	1	2	–	3	–	2
Ohio	1	–	3	–	0	2	–	5	–	1
Ohio Wesleyan	1	–	6	–	0	2	–	7	–	0
Wittenberg	0	–	5	–	0	3	–	7	–	0
$ – Conference champion

The 1913 Ohio Green and White football team represented Ohio University as a member of the Ohio Athletic Conference (OAC) during the 1913 college football season. Led by first-year head coach M. B. Banks, the Green and White compiled an overall record of 2–5–1 with a mark of 1–3 in conference play, placing tenth in the OAC.

== Schedule ==
Date	Opponent	Site	Result	Source
October 4	Wilmington (OH)*	Athens, OH	W 30–0	
October 11	at Cincinnati	Cincinnati, OH	L 2–20	
October 18	Muskingum*	Athens, OH	T 3–3	
October 25	at Otterbein*	Westerville, OH	L 0–21	
November 1	Denison	Athens, OH	L 0–52	
November 8	at Miami (OH)	Miami Field; Oxford, OH (rivalry)	L 6–44	
November 22	Wooster	Athens, OH	W 7–6	
November 27	at Marietta*	Marietta, OH	L 7–13	
*Non-conference game
