= 1913 Miami Redskins football team =

American college football season

1913 Miami Redskins football
- Conference: Ohio Athletic Conference
- Record: 6–2 (4–2 OAC)
- Head coach: James C. Donnelly (2nd season)
- Home stadium: Miami Field

1913 Ohio Athletic Conference football standings
	Conf.					Overall
Team	W		L		T	W		L		T
Oberlin $	5	–	0	–	1	6	–	1	–	1
Ohio State	3	–	0	–	1	4	–	2	–	1
Denison	4	–	1	–	0	5	–	2	–	0
Miami (OH)	4	–	2	–	0	6	–	2	–	0
Cincinnati	4	–	2	–	1	5	–	3	–	1
Western Reserve	3	–	2	–	1	4	–	4	–	1
Case	3	–	3	–	0	4	–	5	–	0
Kenyon	1	–	3	–	1	5	–	3	–	1
Wooster	1	–	3	–	1	2	–	3	–	2
Ohio	1	–	3	–	0	2	–	5	–	1
Ohio Wesleyan	1	–	6	–	0	2	–	7	–	0
Wittenberg	0	–	5	–	0	3	–	7	–	0
$ – Conference champion

The 1913 Miami Redskins american college football team season was an American football team that represented Miami University (OH). as a member of the Ohio Athletic Conference. (OAC) during the 1913 college football season. Led by coach James C. Donnelly in his second year, Miami compiled a 6–2 record. Donnelly was acting professor of physical education at the school.

== Schedule ==
Date	Opponent	Site	Result	Attendance
September 27	Wilmington		W 33–0	
October 4	Georgetown (KY)		W 26–0	
October 11	at Oberlin		L 7–48	
October 25	at Denison		W 19–0	
November 1	Ohio Wesleyan		W 12–0	
November 8	Ohio	(rivalry)	W 44–6	
November 15	at Western Reserve		L 0–7	
November 27	at Cincinnati	(Victory Bell)	W 13–7	
