= Lowell Dana =

American football player and coach (1891–1937)

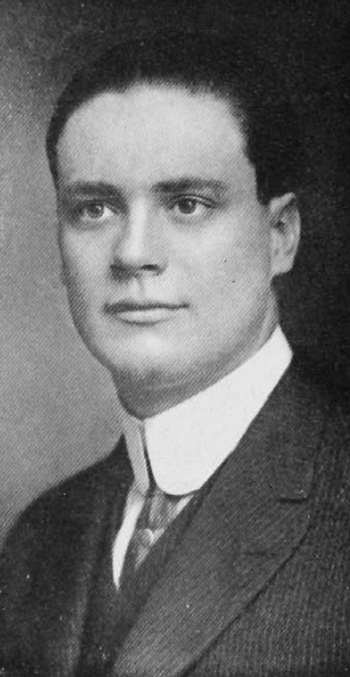
- Dana pictured in The Cincinnatian 1912, Cincinnati yearbook

Biographical details
- Born: February 26, 1891; Muskegon, Michigan, U.S.
- Died: December 6, 1937 (aged 46); Muskegon, Michigan, U.S.

Playing career
- 1911: Dartmouth
- Position: End

Coaching career (HC unless noted)
- 1912–1913: Cincinnati

Head coaching record
- Overall: 8–7–2

Lowell Brockway Dana (February 26, 1891 – December 6, 1937) was an American football player and coach. He served as the head football coach at the University of Cincinnati, serving from 1912 to 1913, and compiling a record of 8–7–2. Dana died of a stroke on December 6, 1937, in Muskegon, Michigan. He had worked with his father in the printing business in Muskegon for previous 20 years.

== Head coaching record ==
Year	Team	Overall	Conference	Standing	Bowl/playoffs
Cincinnati (Ohio Athletic Conference) (1912–1913)
1912	Cincinnati	3–4–1	0–3–1	11th	
1913	Cincinnati	5–3–1	4–2–1	5th	
Cincinnati:		8–7–2	4–5–2		
Total:		8–7–2			
