= H. M. Wheaton =

American football player and coach (1886–1944)

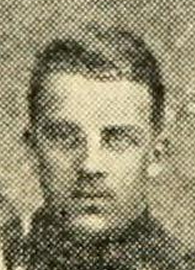
- Wheaton pictured in the 1908 Yale football team photo

Biographical details
- Born: July 5, 1886; Beaver Falls, Pennsylvania, U.S.
- Died: December 12, 1945 (aged 59); New York, New York, U.S.

Playing career
- 1907–1909: Yale
- Position: Halfback

Coaching career (HC unless noted)
- 1914: Kansas

Head coaching record
- Overall: 5–2–1

Henry Myers "Jack" Wheaton (July 5, 1886 – December 12, 1944) was an American football player and coach. He played for Yale University from 1907 to 1909. Wheaton was the 13th head football coach at the University of Kansas, serving for one season, in 1914, and compiling a record of 5–2–1.

== Head coaching record ==
Year	Team	Overall	Conference	Standing	Bowl/playoffs
Kansas Jayhawks (Missouri Valley Intercollegiate Athletic Association) (1914)
1914	Kansas	5–2–1	2–2	4th	
Kansas:		5–2–1	2–2		
Total:		5–2–1			
