= 1914 College of Emporia Fighting Presbies football team =

American college football season

1914 College of Emporia Fighting Presbies football
- Conference: Kansas Collegiate Athletic Conference
- Record: 3–4 (2–3 KCAC)
- Head coach: Wayne B. Granger (2nd season)
- Captain: Williams
- Home stadium: Schaffner Field

The 1914 College of Emporia Fighting Presbies football team represented the College of Emporia as a member of the Kansas Collegiate Athletic Conference (KCAC) during the 1914 college football season. Led by head coach Wayne B. Granger, in his second and final season as head coach, the College of Emporia compiled an overall record of 3–4 with a mark of 2–3 in conference play.

== Schedule ==
Date	Time	Opponent	Site	Result	Attendance	Source
September 26	3:30 p.m.	Olathe Mutes*	Schaffner Field; Emporia, KS	W 105–0		
October 2		Friends	College Field; Emporia, KS	L 7–13		
October 10		at Kansas*	McCook Field; Lawrence, KS	L 0–7		
October 16		Baker	Emporia, KS	W 12–0		
October 24		at Washburn	Washburn field; Topeka, KS	L 2–20		
November 6		at Fairmount	Wichita, KS	W 12–0		
November 20	3:00 p.m.	at Kansas State Normal	Normal Field; Emporia, KS	L 0–19	3,000	
*Non-conference game

== Roster ==
Roster
Player	Position
Williams	L
Wilson Jones	L
Mclivian Smith	L
Wiedower	C
T.C. Russel	C
Strickler	C
McBride	R
Wallace	R
Hughes	R
J. Russell	Q
Shannon Altman	L
Fineman Hinshaw	R
Patten	F
Granger	F
