= 1913 Cincinnati football team =

American college football season

1913 Cincinnati football
- Conference: Ohio Athletic Conference
- Record: 5–3–1 (4–2–1 OAC)
- Head coach: Lowell Dana (2nd season)
- Captain: Clement Fenker
- Home stadium: Carson Field

1913 Ohio Athletic Conference football standings
| | Conf. | | | | | Overall |
| Team | W | | L | | T | W | | L | | T |
|---|---|---|---|---|---|---|---|---|---|---|
| Oberlin $ | 5 | – | 0 | – | 1 | 6 | – | 1 | – | 1 |
| Ohio State | 3 | – | 0 | – | 1 | 4 | – | 2 | – | 1 |
| Denison | 4 | – | 1 | – | 0 | 5 | – | 2 | – | 0 |
| Miami (OH) | 4 | – | 2 | – | 0 | 6 | – | 2 | – | 0 |
| Cincinnati | 4 | – | 2 | – | 1 | 5 | – | 3 | – | 1 |
| Western Reserve | 3 | – | 2 | – | 1 | 4 | – | 4 | – | 1 |
| Case | 3 | – | 3 | – | 0 | 4 | – | 5 | – | 0 |
| Kenyon | 1 | – | 3 | – | 1 | 5 | – | 3 | – | 1 |
| Wooster | 1 | – | 3 | – | 1 | 2 | – | 3 | – | 2 |
| Ohio | 1 | – | 3 | – | 0 | 2 | – | 5 | – | 1 |
| Ohio Wesleyan | 1 | – | 6 | – | 0 | 2 | – | 7 | – | 0 |
| Wittenberg | 0 | – | 5 | – | 0 | 3 | – | 7 | – | 0 |
$ – Conference champion

The 1913 Cincinnati football team was an American football team that represented the University of Cincinnati as a member of the Ohio Athletic Conference (OAC) during the 1913 college football season. Led by Lowell Dana in his second and final season as head coach, Cincinnati compiled an overall record of 5–3–1 record with a mark of 4–2–1 in conference play, placing fifth in the OAC. Clement Fenker was the team captain. The team played home games at Carson Field in Cincinnati.

== Schedule ==
| Date | Opponent | Site | Result | Source |
|---|---|---|---|---|
| September 27 | Georgetown (KY)* | Carson Field; Cincinnati, OH | W 46–0 | |
| October 4 | at Wittenberg | Springfield, OH | W 32–0 | |
| October 11 | Ohio | Carson Field; Cincinnati, OH | W 20–2 | |
| October 18 | Ohio Wesleyan | Carson Field; Cincinnati, OH | W 44–3 | |
| October 25 | at Kentucky* | Stoll Field; Lexington, KY | L 7–27 | |
| November 1 | at Western Reserve | Cleveland, OH | T 0–0 | |
| November 8 | Denison | Carson Field; Cincinnati, OH | L 7–14 | |
| November 15 | Kenyon | Carson Field; Cincinnati, OH | W 14-2 | |
| November 27 | Miami (OH) | Carson Field; Cincinnati, OH (Victory Bell) | L 7-13 | |
*Non-conference game
