= Zora Clevenger =

American sports coach and athletic director (1881–1970)

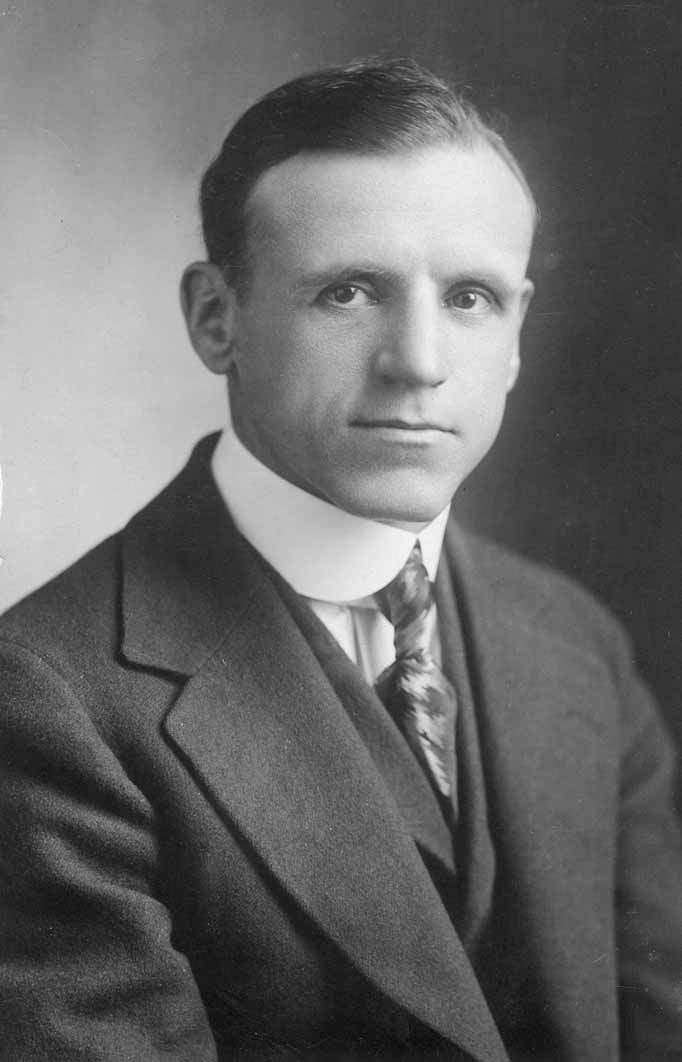

Biographical details
- Born: December 12, 1881; Muncie, Indiana, U.S.
- Died: November 24, 1970 (aged 88); Bloomington, Indiana, U.S.

Playing career

Football
- 1900–1903: Indiana
- Position: Halfback

Coaching career (HC unless noted)

Football
- 1908–1910: Nebraska Wesleyan
- 1911–1915: Tennessee
- 1916–1919: Kansas State

Basketball
- 1904–1906: Indiana
- 1907–1911: Nebraska Wesleyan
- 1911–1916: Tennessee
- 1916–1920: Kansas State

Baseball
- 1905–1906: Indiana
- 1908–1911: Nebraska Wesleyan
- 1911–1916: Tennessee
- 1919–1921: Kansas State

Administrative career (AD unless noted)
- 1906: Indiana
- 1916–1920: Kansas State
- 1921–1923: Missouri
- 1923–1946: Indiana

Head coaching record
- Overall: 47–32–7 (football); 151–72 (basketball); 97–84–4 (baseball)

Accomplishments and honors

Championships
- Football; 1 SIAA (1914)
- College Football Hall of Fame; Inducted in 1968 (profile)

Zora Goodwin Clevenger (December 12, 1881 – November 24, 1970) was an American football, basketball, and baseball player, coach, and pioneering athletic director. He served as the head football coach at Nebraska Wesleyan University (1908–1910), the University of Tennessee (1911–1915), and Kansas State University (1916–1919), compiling a record of 47–32–7. Clevenger was also the head basketball coach at Indiana University (1904–1906), Nebraska Wesleyan (1907–1911), Tennessee (1911–1916), and Kansas State (1916–1919), and was baseball coach at Indiana (1905–1906), Nebraska Wesleyan (1908–1911), Tennessee (1911–1916), and Kansas State (1919–1921). Clevenger served as the athletic director at Kansas State (1916–1920), the University of Missouri (1921–1923), and Indiana (1923–1946). He was inducted into the College Football Hall of Fame as a player in 1968.

== Playing career ==
Clevenger was a star 5'7", 145-pound left halfback on the Indiana Hoosiers football team at Indiana University Bloomington from 1900 to 1903. He also played baseball, as a shortstop, and basketball at Indiana. He was captain of all three squads.

== Coaching and sports administration career ==
Following his graduation, Clevenger served as head coach for the basketball and baseball teams at Indiana for two years. He then coached football, basketball, and baseball at Nebraska Wesleyan University from 1908 to 1911.

In 1911, Clevenger moved to the University of Tennessee, where he served as head football, basketball, and baseball coach until 1916. While at Tennessee, he posted a 26–15–2 record in football, including a conference championship and the school's first undefeated season in 1914. At the same time, his 1915–16 basketball team went undefeated, and was acknowledged as the best team in the South. Clevenger also served as athletic director at Tennessee.

Prior to the 1916 football season, Clevenger moved to Kansas State University, where he served as head football coach, head basketball coach, head baseball coach, and as the first athletic director for the school. Curiously, John R. Bender moved from Kansas State to Tennessee at the same time, so the two schools in effect swapped football coaches. Clevenger's football teams at Kansas State had an overall record of 19–9–2. He found even more success in basketball, posting a 54–17 record, still the best winning percentage in school history, and winning two Missouri Valley Conference championships.

In 1921, Clevenger left the coaching profession and moved to the University of Missouri, where he served as athletic director until 1923. In 1923, Clevenger returned to Indiana and became its most venerated athletic director, holding that position for 23 years before retiring in 1946. He was replaced in the position by Bo McMillin. While at Indiana, Clevenger helped found the annual East–West Shrine Game.

== Honors and death ==
Clevenger was inducted into the College Football Hall of Fame as a player in 1968. The I-Men's Association at Indiana University annually awards a Z. G. Clevenger Award in his honor. It is the highest award given by the organization.

Clevenger died on November 24, 1970, at Bloomington Hospital, after collapsing in a store in Bloomington, Indiana.

== Head coaching record ==
=== Football ===
Year	Team	Overall	Conference	Standing
Nebraska Wesleyan (Independent) (1908–1910)
1908	Nebraska Wesleyan	1–2		
1909	Nebraska Wesleyan	0–3–1		
1910	Nebraska Wesleyan	1–5		
Nebraska Wesleyan:		2–8–3		
Tennessee Volunteers (Southern Intercollegiate Athletic Association) (1911–1915)
1911	Tennessee	3–4–2	0–2–1	T–16th
1912	Tennessee	4–4	1–4	T–14th
1913	Tennessee	6–3	1–3	12th
1914	Tennessee	9–0	7–0	T–1st
1915	Tennessee	4–4	1–4	15th
Tennessee:		26–15–2	10–13–1	
Kansas State Farmers (Missouri Valley Conference) (1916–1919)
1916	Kansas State	6–1–1	1–1–1	4th
1917	Kansas State	6–2	2–2	4th
1918	Kansas State	4–1	0–0	
1919	Kansas State	3–5–1	0–3–1	6th
Kansas State:		19–9–2	3–6–2	
Total:		47–32–7		
National championship Conference title Conference division title or championship game berth
