= 1914 Miami Redskins football team =

American college football season

1914 Miami Redskins football
- Conference: Ohio Athletic Conference
- Record: 5–3 (4–2 OAC)
- Head coach: James C. Donnelly (3rd season)
- Home stadium: Miami Field

1914 Ohio Athletic Conference football standings
	Conf.					Overall
Team	W		L		T	W		L		T
Denison $	5	–	1	–	0	7	–	1	–	0
Mount Union	4	–	1	–	0	6	–	4	–	0
Cincinnati	4	–	2	–	0	6	–	3	–	0
Miami (OH)	4	–	2	–	0	5	–	3	–	0
Ohio	3	–	3	–	0	4	–	4	–	0
Oberlin	3	–	4	–	0	4	–	4	–	0
Case	3	–	4	–	0	4	–	6	–	0
Kenyon	2	–	3	–	0	4	–	3	–	1
Western Reserve	2	–	4	–	0	4	–	6	–	0
Wooster	2	–	5	–	0	2	–	6	–	0
Ohio Wesleyan	2	–	6	–	0	3	–	7	–	0
Wittenberg	0	–	3	–	0	3	–	6	–	0
Ohio State *	3	–	0	–	0	5	–	2	–	0
$ – Conference champion; * – did not complete for championship

The 1914 Miami Redskins football team was an American football team that represented Miami University as a member of the Ohio Athletic Conference (OAC) during the 1914 college football season. Led by coach James C. Donnelly in his third and final year, Miami compiled a 5–3 record.

Donnelly was acting professor of physical education at the school. Donnelly was replaced as head football coach for the 1915 season by Chester J. Roberts. At the time Miami was changing their philosophy of athletics by moving to an all-year athletic coach. Donnelly was unable to be in Oxford for the entire school year since he could only take a limited amount of time off from his law practice in Massachusetts.

== Schedule ==
Date	Opponent	Site	Result	Attendance
September 26	Otterbein		W 40–0	
October 3	at Oberlin		W 9–0	
October 10	at Ohio	(rivalry)	L 0–6	
October 24	at Mount Union		W 16–14	
October 31	at Indiana		L 3–48	
November 7	at Ohio Wesleyan		W 10–3	
November 14	Denison		L 33–40	
November 27	at Cincinnati	(Victory Bell)	W 20–13	
