= 1914 Iowa Hawkeyes football team =

American college football season

1914 Iowa Hawkeyes football

Iowa state champion
- Conference: Western Conference
- Record: 4–3 (1–2 Western)
- Head coach: Jesse Hawley (5th season)
- Captain: Arthur Gunderson
- Home stadium: Iowa Field

1914 Western Conference football standings
	Conf.					Overall
Team	W		L		T	W		L		T
Illinois $	6	–	0	–	0	7	–	0	–	0
Minnesota	3	–	1	–	0	6	–	1	–	0
Chicago	4	–	2	–	1	4	–	2	–	1
Wisconsin	2	–	2	–	1	4	–	2	–	1
Ohio State	2	–	2	–	0	5	–	2	–	0
Purdue	2	–	2	–	0	5	–	2	–	0
Iowa	1	–	2	–	0	4	–	3	–	0
Indiana	1	–	4	–	0	3	–	4	–	0
Northwestern	0	–	6	–	0	1	–	6	–	0
$ – Conference champion

The 1914 Iowa Hawkeyes football team was an American football team that represented the State University of Iowa ("S.U.I."), now commonly known as the University of Iowa, as a member of the Western Conference during the 1914 college football season. In their fifth year under head coach Jesse Hawley, the Hawkeyes compiled a 4–3 record (1–2 in conference games), finished in seventh place in the Western Conference, and outscored opponents by a total of 204 to 36. With victories over Iowa State Teachers, Cornell (IA), and Iowa State, the Hawkeyes were recognized as the Iowa state football champion.

On October 3, 1914, the Hawkeyes defeated Iowa State Teachers by a 95–0 score. The Des Moines Register called it "a farcical game" in which Iowa's first, second, and third teams "scored at will, usually on the first play." Halfback Charles Parsons led the scoring with four touchdowns and six extra points. It remains the largest margin of victory in Iowa football history.

End Arthur Gunderson was the team captain. The team played its home games at Iowa Field in Iowa City, Iowa.

== Schedule ==
Date	Opponent	Site	Result	Attendance	Source
October 3	Iowa State Teachers*	Iowa Field; Iowa City, IA	W 95–0		
October 10	Cornell (IA)*	Iowa Field; Iowa City, IA	W 49–0		
October 17	at Chicago	Stagg Field; Chicago, IL	L 0–7		
October 24	Minnesota^{†}	Iowa Field; Iowa City, IA (rivalry)	L 0–7	9,000	
November 7	at Northwestern	Northwestern Field; Evanston, IL	W 27–0		
November 14	at Iowa State*	State Field; Ames, IA (rivalry)	W 26–6		
November 21	Nebraska*	Iowa Field; Iowa City, IA (rivalry)	L 7–16		
*Non-conference game; ^{†}Homecoming

== Players ==
- Irving Barron, tackle
- Carl Brueckner, guard
- Joseph Carberry, end
- Earl DeNio, tackle
- William Donnelly, halfback
- Herman Garretson, fullback
- Samuel Gross, quarterback
- Arthur Gunderson, end and captain
- Max Houghton, center
- Grover Jacobsen, tackle
- Joseph Kerwick, halfback
- Archie Kirk, tackle
- Charles Parsons, halfback
- Ernest Willis, fullback
- Max Wilson, guard
