= 1914 Wisconsin Badgers football team =

American college football season

1914 Wisconsin Badgers football
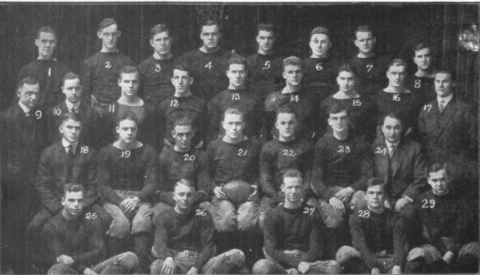
- Conference: Western Conference
- Record: 4–2–1 (2–2–1 Western)
- Head coach: William Juneau (3rd season)
- Captain: Ray Keeler
- Home stadium: Randall Field

1914 Western Conference football standings
	Conf.					Overall
Team	W		L		T	W		L		T
Illinois $	6	–	0	–	0	7	–	0	–	0
Minnesota	3	–	1	–	0	6	–	1	–	0
Chicago	4	–	2	–	1	4	–	2	–	1
Wisconsin	2	–	2	–	1	4	–	2	–	1
Ohio State	2	–	2	–	0	5	–	2	–	0
Purdue	2	–	2	–	0	5	–	2	–	0
Iowa	1	–	2	–	0	4	–	3	–	0
Indiana	1	–	4	–	0	3	–	4	–	0
Northwestern	0	–	6	–	0	1	–	6	–	0
$ – Conference champion

The 1914 Wisconsin Badgers football team represented the University of Wisconsin as a member of the Western Conference during the 1914 college football season. Led by third-year head coach William Juneau, the Badgers compiled an overall record of 4–2–1 with a mark of 2–2–1 in conference play, tying for fourth place in the Western Conference. The team's captain was Ray Keeler.

== Schedule ==
Date	Opponent	Site	Result	Attendance	Source
October 3	Lawrence*	Randall Field; Madison, WI	W 21–0		
October 10	Marquette*	Randall Field; Madison, WI	W 48–0		
October 17	Purdue	Randall Field; Madison, WI	W 14–7		
October 24	at Ohio State	Ohio Field; Columbus, OH	W 7–6		
October 31	Chicago^{†}	Randall Field; Madison, WI	T 0–0		
November 14	at Minnesota	Northrop Field; Minneapolis, MN (rivalry)	L 3–14	17,000	
November 21	Illinois	Randall Field; Madison, WI	L 9–24		
*Non-conference game; ^{†}Homecoming
