= Paul Mason (coach) =

American football player and football/basketball coach

Playing career

Football
- 1914–1915: Purdue
- 1917: Toledo Maroons
- Positions: Left guard, tackle

Coaching career (HC unless noted)

Football
- 1925–1926: Defiance

Basketball
- 1925–1927: Defiance

Head coaching record
- Overall: 3–12–2 (football); 17–23 (basketball)

Paul "Andy" Mason was an American football player and coach, as well as a collegiate basketball coach. He was a 1915 graduate of Purdue University and lettered in 1914 and 1915 on the school's football team. He played professionally for the Toledo Maroons of the Ohio League in 1917.

After his playing career ended, he served as the head football coach (1925–1926) and head men's basketball coach (1925–1927) at Defiance College in Defiance, Ohio.

== Head coaching record ==
=== Football ===
Year	Team	Overall	Conference	Standing	Bowl/playoffs
Defiance Yellow Jackets (Independent) (1925–1926)
1925	Defiance	0–6–2			
1926	Defiance	3–6			
Defiance:		3–12–2			
Total:		3–12–2			
