= 1914 Chicago Maroons football team =

American college football season

1914 Chicago Maroons football
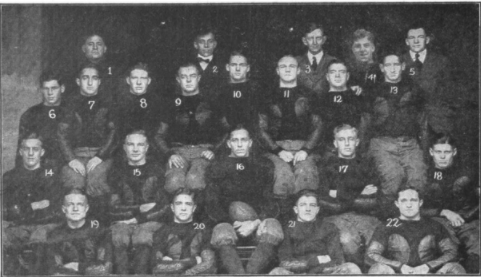
- Conference: Western Conference
- Record: 4–2–1 (4–2–1 Western)
- Head coach: Amos Alonzo Stagg (23rd season)
- Home stadium: Stagg Field

1914 Western Conference football standings
	Conf.					Overall
Team	W		L		T	W		L		T
Illinois $	6	–	0	–	0	7	–	0	–	0
Minnesota	3	–	1	–	0	6	–	1	–	0
Chicago	4	–	2	–	1	4	–	2	–	1
Wisconsin	2	–	2	–	1	4	–	2	–	1
Ohio State	2	–	2	–	0	5	–	2	–	0
Purdue	2	–	2	–	0	5	–	2	–	0
Iowa	1	–	2	–	0	4	–	3	–	0
Indiana	1	–	4	–	0	3	–	4	–	0
Northwestern	0	–	6	–	0	1	–	6	–	0
$ – Conference champion

The 1914 Chicago Maroons football team was an American football team that represented the University of Chicago during the 1914 college football season. In their 23rd season under head coach Amos Alonzo Stagg, the Maroons compiled a 4–2–1 record, finished in second place in the Western Conference, and outscored all opponents by a combined total of 104 to 34.

== Schedule ==
Date	Opponent	Site	Result	Attendance	Source
October 3	Indiana	Stagg Field; Chicago, IL	W 34–0		
October 10	Northwestern	Stagg Field; Chicago, IL	W 28–0		
October 17	Iowa	Stagg Field; Chicago, IL	W 7–0		
October 24	Purdue	Stagg Field; Chicago, IL (rivalry)	W 21–0		
October 31	at Wisconsin	Randall Field; Madison, WI	T 0–0		
November 14	at Illinois	Illinois Field; Champaign, IL	L 7–21		
November 21	Minnesota	Stagg Field; Chicago, IL	L 7–13	13,000	
