= 1914 Northwestern Purple football team =

American college football season

1914 Northwestern Purple football
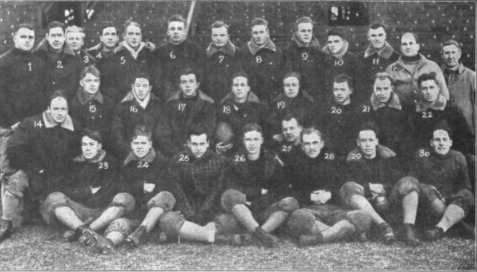
- Conference: Western Conference
- Record: 1–6 (0–6 Western)
- Head coach: Fred J. Murphy (1st season)
- Captain: Wilbur Hightower
- Home stadium: Northwestern Field

1914 Western Conference football standings
	Conf.					Overall
Team	W		L		T	W		L		T
Illinois $	6	–	0	–	0	7	–	0	–	0
Minnesota	3	–	1	–	0	6	–	1	–	0
Chicago	4	–	2	–	1	4	–	2	–	1
Wisconsin	2	–	2	–	1	4	–	2	–	1
Ohio State	2	–	2	–	0	5	–	2	–	0
Purdue	2	–	2	–	0	5	–	2	–	0
Iowa	1	–	2	–	0	4	–	3	–	0
Indiana	1	–	4	–	0	3	–	4	–	0
Northwestern	0	–	6	–	0	1	–	6	–	0
$ – Conference champion

The 1914 Northwestern Purple team represented Northwestern University during the 1914 college football season. In their first year under head coach Fred J. Murphy, the Purple compiled a 1–6 record (0–6 against Western Conference opponents) and finished in last place in the Western Conference.

== Schedule ==
Date	Opponent	Site	Result	Source
October 3	Lake Forest*	Northwestern Field; Evanston, IL	W 7–0	
October 10	at Chicago	Stagg Field; Chicago, IL	L 0–28	
October 17	at Indiana	Jordan Field; Bloomington, IN	L 0–27	
October 24	Illinois	Northwestern Field; Evanston, IL (rivalry)	L 0–33	
November 7	Iowa	Northwestern Field; Evanston, IL	L 0–27	
November 14	Purdue	Northwestern Field; Evanston, IL	L 6–34	
November 21	at Ohio State	Ohio Field; Columbus, OH	L 0–27	
*Non-conference game
