= 1914 Illinois Fighting Illini football team =

American college football season

1914 Illinois Fighting Illini football
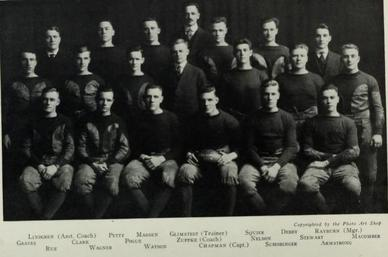

National champion (Billingsley) Co-national champion (Davis) Western Conference champion
- Conference: Western Conference
- Record: 7–0 (6–0 Western)
- Head coach: Robert Zuppke (2nd season)
- Offensive scheme: I formation
- Captain: Ralph Chapman
- Home stadium: Illinois Field

1914 Western Conference football standings
	Conf.					Overall
Team	W		L		T	W		L		T
Illinois $	6	–	0	–	0	7	–	0	–	0
Minnesota	3	–	1	–	0	6	–	1	–	0
Chicago	4	–	2	–	1	4	–	2	–	1
Wisconsin	2	–	2	–	1	4	–	2	–	1
Ohio State	2	–	2	–	0	5	–	2	–	0
Purdue	2	–	2	–	0	5	–	2	–	0
Iowa	1	–	2	–	0	4	–	3	–	0
Indiana	1	–	4	–	0	3	–	4	–	0
Northwestern	0	–	6	–	0	1	–	6	–	0
$ – Conference champion

The 1914 Illinois Fighting Illini football team was an American football team that represented the University of Illinois in the Western Conference during the 1914 college football season. In their second season under head coach Robert Zuppke, the Fighting Illini compiled a 7–0 record (6–0 in conference games), won the Western Conference championship, shut out four of seven opponents, and outscored all opponents by a total of 224 to 22.

There was no contemporaneous system in 1914 for determining a national champion. However, Illinois was retroactively named as the national champion by the Billingsley Report and as a co-national champion by Parke H. Davis. Army was chosen as co-champion by Davis and as national champion by three other selectors.

End Perry Graves and guard Ralph Chapman were consensus picks for the 1914 All-America college football team. Chapman was the team captain. Seven Illini players were also honored on the 1914 All-Western Conference football team selected by Walter Eckersall: quarterback Potsy Clark (first team); halfbacks Harold Pogue (first team); ends George K. Squier (first team) and Perry Graves (second team); guard Ralph Chapman (first team); fullback Eugene Schobinger (second team); and tackle Lennox F. Armstrtong (second team).

== Schedule ==
Date	Opponent	Site	Result	Attendance	Source
October 3	Christian Brothers (MO)*	Illinois Field; Champaign, IL	W 37–0		
October 10	Indiana	Illinois Field; Champaign, IL (rivalry)	W 51–0		
October 17	Ohio State	Illinois Field; Champaign, IL (rivalry)	W 37–0		
October 24	at Northwestern	Northwestern Field; Evanston, IL	W 33–0		
October 31	at Minnesota	Northrop Field; Minneapolis, MN	W 21–6	10,000	
November 14	Chicago	Illinois Field; Champaign, IL	W 21–7		
November 21	at Wisconsin	Randall Field; Madison, WI	W 24–9		
*Non-conference game

== Roster ==
Player	Position
Perry Graves	Right end
Manley Ross Petty	Right tackle
Frank Stewart	Right guard
John Ward Nelson	Right guard
John Wesley Watson	Center
Ralph Chapman (captain)	Left guard
Lennox Francois Armstrong	Left tackle
Olay Madsen	Left tackle
Sylvester Randall Derby	Left end
George Kasson Squier	Left end
George Clark	Quarterback
Bart Macomber	Right halfback
Frank Howard Pethybridge	Right halfback
Eugene Schobinger	Fullback
Orlie Rue	Fullback
Alexander Wagner	Left halfback
Harold Pogue	Left halfback

- Head coach: Robert Zuppke (second year at Illinois)

== Awards and honors ==
- Perry Graves, end

- Consensus first-team selection on the 1914 All-America team

- Ralph Chapman, guard

- Consensus first-team selection on the 1914 All-America team

- Lennox F. Armstrong, tackle

- Third-team All-American selection by Frank G. Menke, sporting editor of the International News Service

- Potsy Clark

- Third-team All-American selection by Frank G. Menke
- Outing magazine's "Football Roll of Honor: The Men Whom the Best Coaches of the Country Have Named as the Stars of the Gridiron in 1914"

- Harold Pogue, halfback

- First-team selection by Fred M. Walker of the Pittsburgh Gazette-Times and The Michigan Daily for the 1914 All-America team
- Second-team selection by Walter Eckersall for the 1914 All-America team of the Chicago Tribune
- Third-team selection by Walter Camp and Frank G. Menke for the 1914 All-America team
- Outing magazine's "Football Roll of Honor"
