= 1914 Minnesota Golden Gophers football team =

American college football season

1914 Minnesota Golden Gophers football
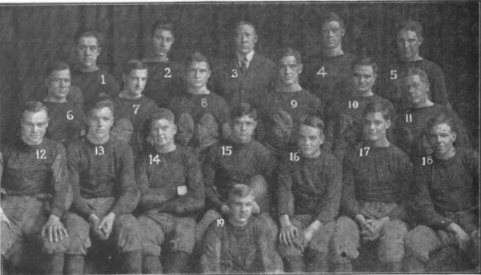
- Conference: Western Conference
- Record: 6–1 (3–1 Western)
- Head coach: Henry L. Williams (15th season)
- Captain: Boles Rosenthal
- Home stadium: Northrop Field

1914 Western Conference football standings
	Conf.					Overall
Team	W		L		T	W		L		T
Illinois $	6	–	0	–	0	7	–	0	–	0
Minnesota	3	–	1	–	0	6	–	1	–	0
Chicago	4	–	2	–	1	4	–	2	–	1
Wisconsin	2	–	2	–	1	4	–	2	–	1
Ohio State	2	–	2	–	0	5	–	2	–	0
Purdue	2	–	2	–	0	5	–	2	–	0
Iowa	1	–	2	–	0	4	–	3	–	0
Indiana	1	–	4	–	0	3	–	4	–	0
Northwestern	0	–	6	–	0	1	–	6	–	0
$ – Conference champion

The 1914 Minnesota Golden Gophers football team represented the University of Minnesota in the 1914 college football season. In their 15th year under head coach Henry L. Williams, the Golden Gophers compiled a 6–1 record (3–1 against Western Conference opponents), finished in second place in the conference, and outscored their opponents by a combined total of 123 to 44. The team's only loss came to conference and national champion Illinois.

Lorin Solon was named an All-American by the Associated Press. Solon was also named All-Big Ten first team.

== Schedule ==
Date	Opponent	Site	Result	Attendance	Source
October 3	North Dakota*	Northrop Field; Minneapolis, MN	W 28–6	2,000	
October 10	Iowa State*	Northrop Field; Minneapolis, MN	W 26–0	3,000	
October 17	South Dakota*	Northrop Field; Minneapolis, MN	W 29–7	3,000	
October 24	at Iowa	Iowa Field; Iowa City, IA (rivalry)	W 7–0	9,000	
October 31	Illinois	Northrop Field; Minneapolis, MN	L 6–21	10,000	
November 14	Wisconsin^{†}	Northrop Field; Minneapolis, MN (rivalry)	W 14–3	17,000	
November 21	at Chicago	Stagg Field; Chicago, IL	W 13–7	13,000	
*Non-conference game; ^{†}Homecoming

== Roster ==
Francis "Frank" Moudry (#2 in team photo above)
