= 1914 Nebraska Cornhuskers football team =

American college football season

1914 Nebraska Cornhuskers football

MVC champion
- Conference: Missouri Valley Conference
- Record: 7–0–1 (3–0 MVC)
- Head coach: Ewald O. Stiehm (4th season)
- Home stadium: Nebraska Field

1914 Missouri Valley Conference football standings
	Conf.					Overall
Team	W		L		T	W		L		T
Nebraska $	3	–	0	–	0	7	–	0	–	1
Missouri	4	–	1	–	0	5	–	3	–	0
Iowa State	2	–	1	–	0	4	–	3	–	0
Kansas	2	–	2	–	0	5	–	2	–	1
Washington University	0	–	1	–	1	3	–	3	–	1
Drake	0	–	3	–	1	4	–	3	–	1
Kansas State	0	–	3	–	0	1	–	5	–	1
$ – Conference champion

The 1914 Nebraska Cornhuskers football team represented the University of Nebraska in the 1914 college football season. The team was coached by fourth-year head coach Ewald O. Stiehm and played its home games at Nebraska Field in Lincoln, Nebraska. They competed as members of the Missouri Valley Conference. The 1914 season was part of Nebraska's 34-game unbeaten streak that ran from 1912 to 1916.

== Schedule ==
Date	Time	Opponent	Site	Result	Source
October 3	2:30 p.m.	Washburn*	Nebraska Field; Lincoln, NE	W 14–7	
October 10	2:30 p.m.	South Dakota*	Nebraska Field; Lincoln, NE	T 0–0	
October 17	2:30 p.m.	at Kansas State	Ahearn Field; Manhattan, KS (rivalry)	W 31–0	
October 24	2:30 p.m.	Michigan Agricultural*	Nebraska Field; Lincoln, NE	W 24–0	
October 31	2:30 p.m.	Iowa State	Nebraska Field; Lincoln, NE (rivalry)	W 20–7	
November 7	2:30 p.m.	Morningside*	Nebraska Field; Lincoln, NE	W 34–7	
November 14	2:30 p.m.	Kansas^{†}	Nebraska Field; Lincoln, NE (rivalry)	W 35–0	
November 21	2:30 p.m.	at Iowa*	Iowa Field; Iowa City, IA (rivalry)	W 16–7	
*Non-conference game; ^{†}Homecoming

== Coaching staff ==
Coach	Position	First year	Alma mater
Ewald O. Stiehm	Head coach	1911	Wisconsin
Jack Best	Trainer	1890	Nebraska

== Roster ==
Abbott, Earl RG
Balis, Arthur E
Caley, Loren HB
Cameron, Robert RT
Chamberlin, Guy HB
Corey, Tim T
DeLamatre, Harry FB
Doyle, Raymond FB
Fouts, Kenneth G
Gross, John G
Halligan, Vic LT
Hawkins, Earl QB
Howard, Warren E
Porter, Grove QB
Potter, Herbert QB
Rutherford, Richard HB
Selzer, Milton HB
Shields, Paul G

== Game summaries ==
=== Washburn ===
Washburn at Nebraska

Team	1	2	Total
Washburn			7
• Nebraska			14

- Date: October 3
- Location: Nebraska Field, Lincoln, NE
- Game start: 2:30 p.m.

=== South Dakota ===
South Dakota at Nebraska

Team	1	2	3	4	Total
South Dakota	0	0	0	0	0
Nebraska	0	0	0	0	0

- Date: October 10
- Location: Nebraska Field, Lincoln, NE
- Game start: 2:30 p.m.

After a three-year break, South Dakota arrived in Lincoln to resume their series with Nebraska. Several South Dakota players allegedly used a loophole which allowed them to play for the Coyotes for six or seven seasons by moving out-of-state in the offseason; therefore, many of South Dakota's players had faced the Cornhuskers four years prior. The game ended in a scoreless draw.

=== At Kansas State ===
Nebraska at Kansas State

Team	1	2	Total
• Nebraska			31
Kansas State			0

- Date: October 17
- Location: Ahearn Field, Manhattan, KS
- Game start: 2:30 p.m.

=== Michigan Agricultural ===
Michigan Agricultural at Nebraska

Team	1	2	Total
MAC			0
• Nebraska			24

- Date: October 24
- Location: Nebraska Field, Lincoln, NE
- Game start: 2:30 p.m.

This was the first game between Nebraska and Michigan Agricultural, which would later become Michigan State.

=== Iowa State ===
Iowa State at Nebraska

Team	1	2	Total
Iowa State			7
• Nebraska			20

- Date: October 31
- Location: Nebraska Field, Lincoln, NE
- Game start: 2:30 p.m.

=== Morningside ===
Morningside at Nebraska

Team	1	2	Total
Morningside			7
• Nebraska			34

- Date: November 7
- Location: Nebraska Field, Lincoln, NE
- Game start: 2:30 p.m.

This was the only meeting between Morningside and Nebraska.

=== Kansas ===
Kansas at Nebraska

Team	1	2	Total
Kansas			0
• Nebraska			35

- Date: November 14
- Location: Nebraska Field, Lincoln, NE
- Game start: 2:30 p.m.

=== At Iowa ===
Nebraska at Iowa

Team	1	2	Total
• Nebraska			16
Iowa			7

- Date: November 21
- Location: Iowa Field, Iowa City, IA
- Game start: 2:30 p.m.
