= 1914 Indiana Hoosiers football team =

American college football season

1914 Indiana Hoosiers football
- Conference: Western Conference
- Record: 3–4 (1–4 Western)
- Head coach: Clarence Childs (1st season)
- Captain: Mark Erehart
- Home stadium: Jordan Field

1914 Western Conference football standings
	Conf.					Overall
Team	W		L		T	W		L		T
Illinois $	6	–	0	–	0	7	–	0	–	0
Minnesota	3	–	1	–	0	6	–	1	–	0
Chicago	4	–	2	–	1	4	–	2	–	1
Wisconsin	2	–	2	–	1	4	–	2	–	1
Ohio State	2	–	2	–	0	5	–	2	–	0
Purdue	2	–	2	–	0	5	–	2	–	0
Iowa	1	–	2	–	0	4	–	3	–	0
Indiana	1	–	4	–	0	3	–	4	–	0
Northwestern	0	–	6	–	0	1	–	6	–	0
$ – Conference champion

The 1914 Indiana Hoosiers football team was an American football team that represented Indiana University Bloomington during the 1914 college football season. In their first season under head coach Clarence Childs, the Hoosiers compiled a 3–4 record, finished in eighth place in the Western Conference, and were outscored by their opponents by a combined total of 130 to 104.

== Schedule ==
Date	Opponent	Site	Result	Source
September 26	DePauw*	Jordan Field; Bloomington, IN	W 13–6	
October 3	at Chicago	Stagg Field; Chicago, IL	L 0–34	
October 10	at Illinois	Illinois Field; Champaign, IL (rivalry)	L 0–51	
October 17	Northwestern	Jordan Field; Bloomington, IN	W 27–0	
October 24	Miami (OH)*	Jordan Field; Bloomington, IN	W 48–3	
November 7	vs. Ohio State	Washington Park; Indianapolis, IN	L 3–13	
November 21	at Purdue	Stuart Field; West Lafayette, IN (rivalry)	L 13–23	
*Non-conference game
