= 1914 Ohio State Buckeyes football team =

American college football season

1914 Ohio State Buckeyes football
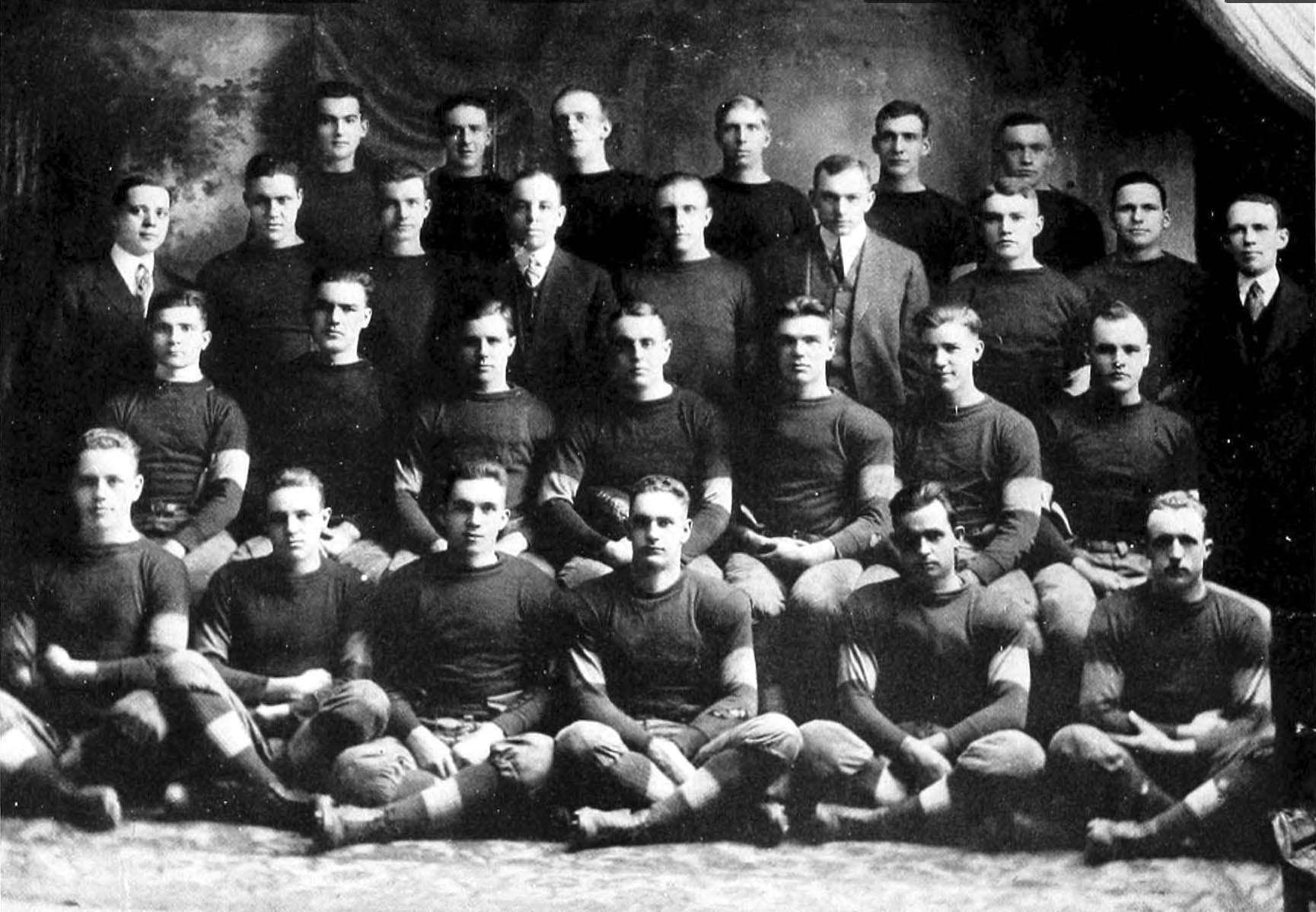
- Conference: Western Conference, Ohio Athletic Conference
- Record: 5–2 (2–2 Western, 3–0 OAC)
- Head coach: John Wilce (2nd season)
- Home stadium: Ohio Field

1914 Western Conference football standings
| | Conf. | | | | | Overall |
| Team | W | | L | | T | W | | L | | T |
|---|---|---|---|---|---|---|---|---|---|---|
| Illinois $ | 6 | – | 0 | – | 0 | 7 | – | 0 | – | 0 |
| Minnesota | 3 | – | 1 | – | 0 | 6 | – | 1 | – | 0 |
| Chicago | 4 | – | 2 | – | 1 | 4 | – | 2 | – | 1 |
| Wisconsin | 2 | – | 2 | – | 1 | 4 | – | 2 | – | 1 |
| Ohio State | 2 | – | 2 | – | 0 | 5 | – | 2 | – | 0 |
| Purdue | 2 | – | 2 | – | 0 | 5 | – | 2 | – | 0 |
| Iowa | 1 | – | 2 | – | 0 | 4 | – | 3 | – | 0 |
| Indiana | 1 | – | 4 | – | 0 | 3 | – | 4 | – | 0 |
| Northwestern | 0 | – | 6 | – | 0 | 1 | – | 6 | – | 0 |
$ – Conference champion

1914 Ohio Athletic Conference football standings
| | Conf. | | | | | Overall |
| Team | W | | L | | T | W | | L | | T |
|---|---|---|---|---|---|---|---|---|---|---|
| Denison $ | 5 | – | 1 | – | 0 | 7 | – | 1 | – | 0 |
| Mount Union | 4 | – | 1 | – | 0 | 6 | – | 4 | – | 0 |
| Cincinnati | 4 | – | 2 | – | 0 | 6 | – | 3 | – | 0 |
| Miami (OH) | 4 | – | 2 | – | 0 | 5 | – | 3 | – | 0 |
| Ohio | 3 | – | 3 | – | 0 | 4 | – | 4 | – | 0 |
| Oberlin | 3 | – | 4 | – | 0 | 4 | – | 4 | – | 0 |
| Case | 3 | – | 4 | – | 0 | 4 | – | 6 | – | 0 |
| Kenyon | 2 | – | 3 | – | 0 | 4 | – | 3 | – | 1 |
| Western Reserve | 2 | – | 4 | – | 0 | 4 | – | 6 | – | 0 |
| Wooster | 2 | – | 5 | – | 0 | 2 | – | 6 | – | 0 |
| Ohio Wesleyan | 2 | – | 6 | – | 0 | 3 | – | 7 | – | 0 |
| Wittenberg | 0 | – | 3 | – | 0 | 3 | – | 6 | – | 0 |
| Ohio State * | 3 | – | 0 | – | 0 | 5 | – | 2 | – | 0 |
$ – Conference champion; * – did not complete for championship

The 1914 Ohio State Buckeyes football team represented Ohio State University as a member of the Western Conference and the Ohio Athletic Conference (OAC) during the 1914 college football season. Led by second-year head coach, John Wilce, the Buckeyes compiled an overall record of 5–2 and outscored opponents 108–55. Ohio State had a record of 2–2 against Western Conference opponents and 3–0 in OAC play.

The game against Illinois was their third all-time meeting and their first game against the Fighting Illini as conference-mates.

== Schedule ==
| Date | Opponent | Site | Result | Source |
|---|---|---|---|---|
| October 3 | Ohio Wesleyan | Ohio Field; Columbus, OH | W 16–2 | |
| October 10 | Case | Van Horn Field; Cleveland, OH | W 7–6 | |
| October 17 | at Illinois | Illinois Field; Champaign, IL (rivalry) | L 0–37 | |
| October 24 | Wisconsin | Ohio Field; Columbus, OH | L 6–7 | |
| November 7 | vs. Indiana | Washington Park; Indianapolis, IN | W 13–3 | |
| November 14 | Oberlin | Ohio Field; Columbus, OH | W 39–0 | |
| November 21 | Northwestern | Ohio Field; Columbus, OH | W 27–0 | |

== Roster ==
- Ernie Godfrey

== Coaching staff ==
- John Wilce, head coach, second year
