= Ahearn Field =

Athletic field at Kansas State University

- Interactive map of Ahearn Field
- Location: 39.186770°N 96.584331°W
- Owner: Kansas State
- Operator: Kansas State
- Capacity: Approximately 1,500
- Surface: Grass

Construction
- Opened: April 15, 1911
- Closed: 1922
- Cost: $10,000

Tenant
- Kansas State Wildcats

Ahearn Field was the first on-campus athletic field for Kansas State University in Manhattan, Kansas. It was utilized from 1911 to 1922 by the football team, baseball team, and track team. The field was named in honor of former coach Mike Ahearn.

The field was inaugurated with a high school track competition on April 15, 1911.

Prior to the establishment of Ahearn Field, Kansas State's athletic teams played in an open public square in Manhattan at Bluemont Avenue and 8th Street, informally known as Athletic Park. In 1906, a covered wooden grandstand and a small locker room were constructed at Athletic Park. These structures were relocated to Ahearn Field in 1911. The grandstand was situated at the south end of the field, facing north, approximately where the K-State Alumni Center currently stands.

In 1922, Memorial Stadium was opened at the same location, prompting a reorientation of the football field from east–west to north–south and the removal of the old grandstand. As late as 1938, Memorial Stadium was still referred to as Ahearn Field at Memorial Stadium.

The pronunciation of "Ahearn" as "a-HEARN" is based on the family's preference for a short "a" sound.

== Expansion of Ahearn Field's Role in Athletics ==
Ahearn Field served as the home for multiple athletic programs at Kansas State University, including football, baseball, and track and field. The track surrounding the football field hosted numerous regional high school and college track meets. Additionally, the venue was used for community gatherings, making it a central location for both athletic and social events in Manhattan.

== Facilities and Features at Ahearn Field ==
The relocated grandstand from Athletic Park accommodated approximately 1,500 spectators. A modest wooden locker room was available for the football team. These facilities represented Kansas State University's initial efforts to provide dedicated athletic infrastructure, laying the foundation for future developments.

== Kansas State Wildcats Football Record at Ahearn Field (1911–1921) ==
Below is a table of the Kansas State Wildcats’ home game results while they played at Ahearn Field.

Year	Date	Opponent	Final Score
1911	Sep 30 (Sat)	Southwestern	W, 6-6
1911	Oct 7 (Sat)	Emporia State	L, 0-3
1911	Oct 14 (Sat)	Kansas	L, 0-59
1911	Oct 21 (Sat)	Kansas	L, 0-6
1911	Oct 28 (Sat)	Wichita	W, 9-5
1911	Nov 4 (Sat)	Creighton	W, 12-0
1911	Nov 11 (Sat)	Arkansas	W, 3-0
1911	Nov 18 (Sat)	Oklahoma State	W, 11-0
1911	Nov 24 (Fri)	Washburn	W, 6-5
1912	Sep 28 (Sat)	Haskell Institute	W, 19-7
1912	Oct 9 (Wed)	Haskell Institute	W, 21-14
1912	Oct 19 (Sat)	Emporia State	L, 6-30
1912	Oct 26 (Sat)	Wichita	W, 54-0
1912	Nov 2 (Sat)	College of Emporia	W, 28-7
1912	Nov 8 (Fri)	Colorado	W, 14-6
1912	Nov 16 (Sat)	Texas A&M	W, 13-10
1912	Nov 20 (Wed)	Washburn	W, 21-3
1913	Oct 3 (Fri)	Nebraska	L, 10-13
1913	Oct 10 (Fri)	Nebraska	L, 6-24
1913	Oct 18 (Sat)	Kansas	L, 0-26
1913	Oct 25 (Sat)	Wichita	W, 30-7
1913	Nov 1 (Sat)	Texas A&M	W, 12-0
1913	Nov 8 (Sat)	Texas	L, 0-46
1913	Nov 18 (Tue)	Washburn	T, 6-6
1914	Oct 3 (Sat)	Emporia State	W, 15-0
1914	Oct 10 (Sat)	Nebraska	L, 0-31
1914	Oct 17 (Sat)	Kansas	L, 0-28
1914	Oct 24 (Sat)	Missouri	L, 3-13
1914	Oct 31 (Sat)	Oklahoma	L, 10-52
1914	Nov 13 (Fri)	Washburn	L, 16-26
1915	Oct 1 (Fri)	Nebraska	L, 0-31
1915	Oct 9 (Sat)	Emporia State	L, 0-13
1915	Oct 16 (Sat)	Kansas	L, 7-19
1915	Oct 30 (Sat)	Friends	W, 14-0
1915	Nov 6 (Sat)	Washburn	W, 6-0
1915	Nov 13 (Sat)	Oklahoma	L, 7-21
1916	Sep 30 (Sat)	Baker	W, 20-0
1916	Oct 6 (Fri)	Southwestern College (Kan.)	W, 53-0
1916	Oct 11 (Wed)	Emporia State	W, 13-3
1916	Oct 28 (Sat)	Missouri	W, 7-6
1916	Nov 11 (Sat)	Washburn	W, 47-0
1917	Sep 28 (Fri)	Baker	W, 28-0
1917	Oct 6 (Sat)	Missouri	W, 7-6
1917	Oct 13 (Sat)	Washington (St. Louis)	W, 61-0
1917	Oct 20 (Sat)	Kansas	L, 0-9
1917	Nov 10 (Sat)	Emporia State	W, 51-0
1917	Nov 22 (Thu)	Washburn	W, 38-0
1918	Sep 28 (Sat)	Baker	W, 22-0
1918	Oct 5 (Sat)	Washburn	W, 28-9
1918	Nov 9 (Sat)	Iowa State	W, 11-0
1918	Nov 28 (Thu)	Washburn	W, 6-5
1919	Sep 28 (Sun)	Baker	W, 16-0
1919	Oct 3 (Fri)	Missouri	T, 6-6
1919	Oct 18 (Sat)	Fort Hays State	W, 12-0
1919	Oct 25 (Sat)	Kansas	L, 3-16
1919	Nov 1 (Sat)	Haskell Institute	L, 3-7
1919	Nov 19 (Fri)	Washburn	T, 0-0
1920	Oct 1 (Fri)	Camp Funston	W, 55-0
1920	Oct 8 (Fri)	Emporia State	T, 7-7
1920	Oct 22 (Sat)	Kansas	L, 0-14
1921	Oct 1 (Sat)	Washington (St. Louis)	W, 21-0
1921	Oct 15 (Sat)	Missouri	W, 7-5
1921	Oct 29 (Sat)	Grinnell	W, 21-7
1921	Nov 11 (Fri)	Oklahoma	W, 14-7

== Transition to Memorial Stadium ==
By 1922, Kansas State University sought a more modern and expansive athletic facility, leading to the construction of Memorial Stadium at the Ahearn Field site. Memorial Stadium was established to honor Kansas State students who served in World War I. The transition involved reorienting the football field from an east–west alignment to a north–south alignment to enhance spectator viewing and seating arrangements. Memorial Stadium became the new home for the Kansas State Wildcats football team, while references to Ahearn Field persisted in university publications until the late 1930s.

== Legacy and Significance ==
Ahearn Field played a pivotal role in the development of collegiate athletics at Kansas State University. Transitioning from informal athletic spaces to a dedicated facility, it facilitated improved recruitment, organized athletic schedules, and enhanced training for athletes. The field's dedication to Mike Ahearn reflected his significant contributions to the university's athletic and student life.
