= Rollins Field =

Stadium in Columbia, Missouri

- Interactive map of Rollins Field
- Location: Columbia, Missouri
- Coordinates: 38°56′27″N 92°19′46″W
- Owner: University of Missouri
- Operator: University of Missouri
- Capacity: 13,000

Construction
- Opened: field completed in 1895, concrete seating completed in 1911.

Tenant
- Missouri Tigers football

Rollins Field was a stadium in Columbia, Missouri. It hosted the University of Missouri Tigers football team until they moved to Memorial Stadium in 1926. The stadium held 13,000 people at its peak. It hosted the first homecoming in 1911.
