= 1913 Southern Intercollegiate Athletic Association football season =

- League: NCAA
- Sport: College football
- Duration: September 27, 1913 through November 29, 1913
- Teams: 17

Regular Season
- Season champions: Auburn

Football seasons
- ← 1912 1914 →

1913 Southern Intercollegiate Athletic Association football standings
	Conf.					Overall
Team	W		L		T	W		L		T
Auburn $	8	–	0	–	0	8	–	0	–	0
Mississippi A&M	5	–	1	–	1	6	–	1	–	1
Georgia	3	–	1	–	0	6	–	2	–	0
Vanderbilt	3	–	1	–	0	5	–	3	–	0
Georgia Tech	5	–	2	–	0	7	–	2	–	0
Alabama	4	–	3	–	0	6	–	3	–	0
LSU	1	–	1	–	2	6	–	1	–	2
Sewanee	2	–	2	–	0	4	–	3	–	0
Florida	2	–	2	–	0	4	–	3	–	0
Clemson	2	–	4	–	0	4	–	4	–	0
Mississippi College	1	–	2	–	0	6	–	3	–	0
Tennessee	1	–	3	–	0	6	–	3	–	0
The Citadel	0	–	3	–	1	3	–	4	–	2
Mercer	0	–	4	–	1	2	–	5	–	1
Kentucky	0	–	1	–	0	6	–	2	–	0
Texas A&M	0	–	1	–	1	3	–	4	–	2
Central University	0	–	2	–	0	2	–	5	–	0
Tulane	0	–	4	–	0	3	–	5	–	0
$ – Conference champion

The 1913 Southern Intercollegiate Athletic Association football season was the college football games played by the member schools of the Southern Intercollegiate Athletic Association as part of the 1913 college football season. The season began on September 27. Conference play began that day with Alabama hosting Howard.

Teams other than Vanderbilt had a chance to win a title, and newspapers covered football more than the World Series for the first time.

Fuzzy Woodruff says the Southern newspapers began to cover football more than the World Series. The Auburn Tigers won the conference, posting an undefeated, 8–0 record. Auburn captain Kirk Newell was later a hero of World War I. The 1913 Tigers were retroactively recognized as a national champion by the Billingsley Report's alternative calculation which considers teams' margin of victory. (Note: Under Billingsley's primary methodology, Chicago was recognized as the national champion.) Auburn does not claim the title.

Tennessee won its first SIAA game since 1910. Ole Miss was suspended from SIAA play.

== Regular season ==
Index to colors and formatting
Non-conference matchup; SIAA member won
Non-conference matchup; SIAA member lost
Non-conference matchup; tie
Conference matchup

SIAA teams in bold.

=== Week One ===
Date	Visiting team	Home team	Site	Result	Attendance	Reference
September 27	Howard (AL)	**Alabama**	The Quad • Tuscaloosa, AL	**W** 27–0		
September 27	Charleston Navy	**The Citadel**	College Park Stadium • Charleston, SC	**W** 34–0		
September 27	Camp McPherson	**Georgia Tech**	Grant Field • Atlanta, GA	**W** 19–0		
September 27	Butler	**Kentucky**	Stoll Field • Lexington, KY	**W** 21–7		
September 27	Carson–Newman	**Tennessee**	Waite Field • Knoxville, TN	**W** 58–0		

=== Week Two ===
Date	Visiting team	Home team	Site	Result	Attendance	Reference
October 4	Birmingham	**Alabama**	The Quad • Tuscaloosa, AL	**W** 81–0		
October 4	**Mercer**	**Auburn**	Drake Field • Auburn, AL	**AUB** 53–0		
October 4	duPont Manual High School	**Central University**	Cheek Field • Danville, KY	**W** 19–0		
October 4	Davidson	**Clemson**	Bowman Field • Calhoun, SC	**W** 6–3		
October 4	Alabama Presbyterian	**Georgia**	Sanford Field • Athens, GA	**W** 108–0		
October 4	**The Citadel**	**Georgia Tech**	Grant Field • Atlanta, GA	**GT** 47–0		
October 4	**Kentucky**	Illinois	Illinois Field • Champaign, IL	**L** 0–21		
October 4	**LSU**	Louisiana Industrial	Tech Athletic Field • Ruston, LA	**W** 20–2		
October 4	Howard (AL)	**Mississippi A&M**	Hardy Field • Starkville, MS	**W** 66–0		
October 4	Chattanooga	**Sewanee**	Hardee Field • Sewanee, TN	**W** 28–0		
October 4	Athens School of the University of Chattanooga	**Tennessee**	Waite Field • Knoxville, TN	**W** 95–0		
October 4	Maryville (TN)	**Vanderbilt**	Dudley Field • Nashville, TN	**W** 59–0		
October 4	Pearl River County Agricultural High School	**Mississippi College**	Clinton, MS	**W** 67–0		
October 6	Florida Southern	**Florida**	University Field • Gainesville, FL	**W** 144–0		

=== Week Three ===
Date	Visiting team	Home team	Site	Result	Attendance	Reference
October 10	**Mississippi College**	**Mississippi A&M**	Hardy Field • Starkville, MS	**MSA&M** 14–13		
October 11	**Clemson**	**Alabama**	The Quad • Tuscaloosa, AL	**ALA** 20–0		
October 11	**Florida**	**Auburn**	Drake Field • Auburn, AL	**AUB** 55–0		
October 11	Porter Military	**The Citadel**	College Park Stadium • Charleston, SC	**T** 0–0		
October 11	North Georgia	**Georgia**	Sanford Field • Athens, GA	**W** 51–0		
October 11	**LSU**	Southwestern Louisiana	Campus Athletic Field • Lafayette, LA	**W** 26–0		
October 11	10th District A. C.	**Mercer**	Central City Park • Macon, GA	**W** 44–0		
October 11	Marion County High School	**Sewanee**	Hardee Field • Sewanee, TN	**W** 88–0		
October 11	Jefferson College (LA)	**Tulane**	Tulane Stadium • New Orleans, LA	**W** 13–0		
October 11	**Central University**	**Vanderbilt**	Dudley Field • Nashville, TN	**VAN** 48–0		
October 12	**Georgia Tech**	Chattanooga	Chamberlain Field • Chattanooga, TN	**W** 71–6		

=== Week Four ===
Date	Visiting team	Home team	Site	Result	Attendance	Reference
October 17	**Central University**	**Mississippi A&M**	Columbus Fair Grounds • Columbus, MS	**MSA&M** 31–0		
October 18	**Auburn**	**Clemson**	Bowman Field • Calhoun, SC	**AUB** 20–0		
October 18	**The Citadel**	College of Charleston	College Park Stadium • Charleston, SC	**W** 72–0		
October 18	Maryville (TN)	**Florida**	Fleming Field • Gainesville, FL	**W** 39–0		
October 18	**Georgia**	**Alabama**	Rickwood Field • Birmingham, AL	**UGA** 20–0		
October 18	**Mercer**	**Georgia Tech**	Grant Field • Atlanta, GA	**GT** 33–0		
October 18	Ohio Northern	**Kentucky**	Stoll Field • Lexington, KY	**W** 21–0		
October 18	Jefferson College (LA)	**LSU**	State Field • Baton Rouge, LA	**W** 45–6		
October 18	**Tennessee**	**Sewanee**	Andrews Field • Chattanooga, TN	**SEW** 17–6		
October 18	**Mississippi College**	**Tulane**	Tulane Stadium • New Orleans, LA	**MSCOLL** 13–3		
October 18	Henderson-Brown	**Vanderbilt**	Dudley Field • Nashville, TN	**W** 33–0		

=== Week Five ===
Date	Visiting team	Home team	Site	Result	Attendance	Reference
October 23	Baylor	**LSU**	State Field • Baton Rouge, LA	**W** 50–0		
October 25	**Alabama**	**Tulane**	Tulane Stadium • New Orleans, LA	**ALA** 26–0		
October 25	**Mississippi A&M**	**Auburn**	Rickwood Field • Birmingham, AL	**AUB** 34–0		
October 25	Kentucky Military Institute	**Central University**	Cheek Field • Danville, KY	**W** 44–0		
October 25	**Georgia Tech**	**Florida**	Barrs Field • Jacksonville, FL	**GT** 13–3		
October 25	Cincinnati	**Kentucky**	Stoll Field • Lexington, KY	**W** 27–7		
October 25	**The Citadel**	**Mercer**	Central City Park • Macon, GA	**T** 7–7		
October 25	**Sewanee**	Texas	State Fair Stadium • Dallas, TX	**L** 7–13		
October 25	Virginia	**Georgia**	Ponce de Leon Park • Atlanta, GA	**L** 13–6		
October 25	Michigan	**Vanderbilt**	Dudley Field • Nashville, TN	**L** 2–33		
October 25	**Mississippi College**	Ouachita Baptist	Arkadelphia, AR	**W** 22–14		

=== Week Six ===
Date	Visiting team	Home team	Site	Result	Attendance	Reference
October 27	Davidson	**Tennessee**	Waite Field • Knoxville, TN	**W** 9–0		
October 28	**Mississippi College**	Henderson-Brown	Arkadelphia, AR	**W** 7–2		
October 30	**Clemson**	South Carolina	State Fairgrounds • Columbia, SC	**W** 32–0		
November 1	**Alabama**	**Mississippi College**	Mississippi State Fairgrounds • Jackson, MS	**ALA** 21–7	6,000	
November 1	**LSU**	**Auburn**	Monroe Park • Mobile, AL	**AUB** 7–0		
November 1	**Sewanee**	**Georgia Tech**	Grant Field • Atlanta, GA	**GT** 33–0		
November 1	North Carolina	**Georgia**	Sanford Field • Athens, GA	**W** 19–6		
November 1	Earlham	**Kentucky**	Stoll Field • Lexington, KY	**W** 28–0		
November 1	Alabama Presbyterian	**Mercer**	Central City Park • Macon, GA	**W** 33–0		
November 1	**Mississippi A&M**	**Texas A&M**	State Fair Stadium • Dallas, TX	**MSA&M** 6–0		
November 1	Chattanooga	**Tennessee**	Waite Field • Knoxville, TN	**W** 21–0		
November 1	**Tulane**	Saint Louis	American League Park • St. Louis, MO	**W** 12–6		
November 1	**Vanderbilt**	Virginia	Lambeth Field • Charlottesville, VA	**L** 0–34		

=== Week Seven ===
Date	Visiting team	Home team	Site	Result	Attendance	Reference
November 6	**Clemson**	**Georgia**	Augusta, GA	**UGA** 18–15		
November 7	**Mississippi College**	Marion	Marion Field • Marion, AL	**L** 0–7		
November 8	**Auburn**	**Georgia Tech**	Grant Field • Atlanta, GA	**AUB** 20–0		
November 8	**Central University**	Chattanooga	Chamberlain Field • Chattanooga, TN	**L** 18–27		
November 8	**Clemson**	**The Citadel**	College Park Stadium • Charleston, SC	**CLEM** 7–3		
November 8	**Florida**	South Carolina	Davis Field • Columbia, SC	**L** 0–13		
November 8	Wilmington (OH)	**Kentucky**	Stoll Field • Lexington, KY	**W** 33–0		
November 8	Arkansas	**LSU**	Fair Grounds Field • Shreveport, LA	**W** 12–7		
November 8	Stetson	**Mercer**	Jacksonville, FL	**L** 6–13		
November 8	**Tulane**	**Mississippi A&M**	Hardy Field • Starkville, MS	**MSA&M** 32–0		
November 8	**Tennessee**	**Vanderbilt**	Dudley Field • Nashville, TN	**VAN** 7–6		
November 9	**Sewanee**	**Alabama**	Rickwood Field • Birmingham, AL	**SEW** 10–7		

=== Week Eight ===
Date	Visiting team	Home team	Site	Result	Attendance	Reference
November 14	**Tennessee**	**Alabama**	The Quad • Tuscaloosa, AL	**ALA** 6–0		
November 14	**Mississippi College**	Louisiana Industrial	Athletic Field • Ruston, LA	**W** 7–3		
November 15	**Vanderbilt**	**Auburn**	Rickwood Field • Birmingham, AL	**AUB** 14–6		
November 15	**The Citadel**	**Florida**	Fleming Field • Gainesville, FL	**FLA** 18–13		
November 15	**Georgia**	**Georgia Tech**	Grant Field • Atlanta, GA	**UGA** 14–0		
November 15	**LSU**	**Mississippi A&M**	Hardy Field • Starkville, MS	**T** 0–0		
November 15	Southwestern (TX)	**Tulane**	Tulane Stadium • New Orleans, LA	**W** 31–9		
November 17	**Clemson**	**Mercer**	Central City Park • Macon, GA	**CLEM** 52–0		

=== Week Nine ===
Date	Visiting team	Home team	Site	Result	Attendance	Reference
November 20	Georgetown (KY)	**Central University**	Cheek Field • Danville, KY	**L** 13–33		
November 22	**Auburn**	**Georgia**	Ponce de Leon Park • Atlanta, GA	**AUB** 21–7	12,000	
November 22	**Kentucky**	Louisville	Eclipse Park • Louisville, KY	**W** 20–0	4,000	
November 22	**Tulane**	**LSU**	State Field • Baton Rouge, LA	**LSU** 40–0		
November 22	**Sewanee**	**Vanderbilt**	Dudley Field • Nashville, TN	**VAN** 63–13		

=== Week Ten ===
Date	Visiting team	Home team	Site	Result	Attendance	Reference
November 26	**The Citadel**	South Carolina	Davis Field • Columbia, SC	**L** 42–13		
November 27	Arkansas	**Tulane**	Tulane Stadium • New Orleans, LA	**L** 0–14		
November 27	**Mercer**	**Florida**	Fleming Field • Gainesville, FL	**FLA** 24–0		
November 27	**Central University**	Transylvania	Thomas Field • Lexington, KY	**L** 0–6		
November 27	**Clemson**	**Georgia Tech**	Grant Field • Atlanta, GA	**GT** 34–0		
November 27	**Tennessee**	**Kentucky**	Stoll Field • Lexington, KY	**TENN** 13–7		
November 27	**Mississippi A&M**	**Alabama**	Rickwood Field • Birmingham, AL	**MSA&M** 7–0		
November 27	**LSU**	**Texas A&M**	West End Park • Houston, TX	**T** 7–7		
November 27	Howard (AL)	**Mississippi College**	Mississippi State Fairgrounds • Jackson, MS	**W** 10–6	2,500	

== Awards and honors ==
=== All-Americans ===
- HB - Bob McWhorter, Georgia (PHD-1)

=== All-Southern team ===
The composite All-Southern team formed by the selection of 18 sporting writers culled by the Atlanta Constitution included:

Position	Name	First-team selectors	Team
QB	David Paddock	C, ZC, SP	Georgia
HB	Bob McWhorter	C, ZC, SP	Georgia
HB	Kirk Newell	C, ZC, SP	Auburn
FB	Red Harris	C, ZC	Auburn
E	Enoch Brown	C, ZC, SP	Vanderbilt
T	Tom Brown	C, ZC, SP	Vanderbilt
G	Big Thigpen	C, ZC, SP	Auburn
C	Boozer Pitts	C, ZC, SP	Auburn
G	R. N. MacCallum	C	Sewanee
T	Paul Turner	C, ZC, SP	Georgia
E	Robbie Robinson	C, ZC, SP	Auburn
