= 1913 Tennessee Volunteers football team =

American college football season

1913 Tennessee Volunteers football
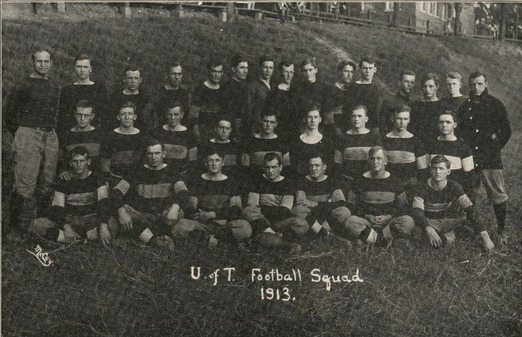
- Conference: Southern Intercollegiate Athletic Association
- Record: 6–3 (1–3 SIAA)
- Head coach: Zora Clevenger (3rd season)
- Offensive scheme: Straight T
- Base defense: Multiple
- Captain: Sam Hayley
- Home stadium: Waite Field

Uniform
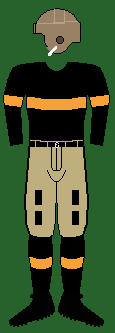

1913 Southern Intercollegiate Athletic Association football standings
| | Conf. | | | | | Overall |
| Team | W | | L | | T | W | | L | | T |
|---|---|---|---|---|---|---|---|---|---|---|
| Auburn $ | 8 | – | 0 | – | 0 | 8 | – | 0 | – | 0 |
| Mississippi A&M | 5 | – | 1 | – | 1 | 6 | – | 1 | – | 1 |
| Georgia | 3 | – | 1 | – | 0 | 6 | – | 2 | – | 0 |
| Vanderbilt | 3 | – | 1 | – | 0 | 5 | – | 3 | – | 0 |
| Georgia Tech | 5 | – | 2 | – | 0 | 7 | – | 2 | – | 0 |
| Alabama | 4 | – | 3 | – | 0 | 6 | – | 3 | – | 0 |
| LSU | 1 | – | 1 | – | 2 | 6 | – | 1 | – | 2 |
| Sewanee | 2 | – | 2 | – | 0 | 4 | – | 3 | – | 0 |
| Florida | 2 | – | 2 | – | 0 | 4 | – | 3 | – | 0 |
| Clemson | 2 | – | 4 | – | 0 | 4 | – | 4 | – | 0 |
| Mississippi College | 1 | – | 2 | – | 0 | 6 | – | 3 | – | 0 |
| Tennessee | 1 | – | 3 | – | 0 | 6 | – | 3 | – | 0 |
| The Citadel | 0 | – | 3 | – | 1 | 3 | – | 4 | – | 2 |
| Mercer | 0 | – | 4 | – | 1 | 2 | – | 5 | – | 1 |
| Kentucky | 0 | – | 1 | – | 0 | 6 | – | 2 | – | 0 |
| Texas A&M | 0 | – | 1 | – | 1 | 3 | – | 4 | – | 2 |
| Central University | 0 | – | 2 | – | 0 | 2 | – | 5 | – | 0 |
| Tulane | 0 | – | 4 | – | 0 | 3 | – | 5 | – | 0 |
$ – Conference champion

The 1913 Tennessee Volunteers football team represented the University of Tennessee in the 1913 Southern Intercollegiate Athletic Association football season. The Volunteers had a winning record for the first time since 1908 and won their first Southern Intercollegiate Athletic Association game since 1910.

== Schedule ==
| Date | Opponent | Site | Result | Source |
|---|---|---|---|---|
| September 27 | Carson–Newman* | Waite Field; Knoxville, TN | W 58–0 | |
| October 4 | Athens School of the University of Chattanooga* | Waite Field; Knoxville, TN | W 95–0 | |
| October 11 | Maryville (TN)* | Waite Field; Knoxville, TN | W 75–0 | |
| October 18 | vs. Sewanee | Andrews Field; Chattanooga, TN | L 6–17 | |
| October 27 | Davidson* | Waite Field; Knoxville, TN | W 9–0 | |
| November 1 | Chattanooga* | Waite Field; Knoxville, TN | W 21–0 | |
| November 8 | at Vanderbilt | Dudley Field; Nashville, TN (rivalry) | L 6–7 | |
| November 14 | at Alabama | The Quad; Tuscaloosa, AL (rivalry) | L 0–6 | |
| November 27 | at Kentucky | Stoll Athletic Field; Lexington, KY (rivalry) | W 13–7 | |
*Non-conference game

== Game summaries ==
=== Vanderbilt ===
Red Rainey scored Tennessee's touchdown. Goat Carroll missed the kick. Tennessee's right guard S. D. Bayer drew a 33-yard, half the distance to the goal penalty for slugging, and was ejected by umpire Bradley Walker. The first down after, Hord Boensch threw a touchdown pass to Enoch Brown. Brown ran the last ten yards shaking off several defenders. Boensch kicked goal and won the game for Vanderbilt.
