= 1913 Vanderbilt Commodores football team =

American college football season

1913 Vanderbilt Commodores football
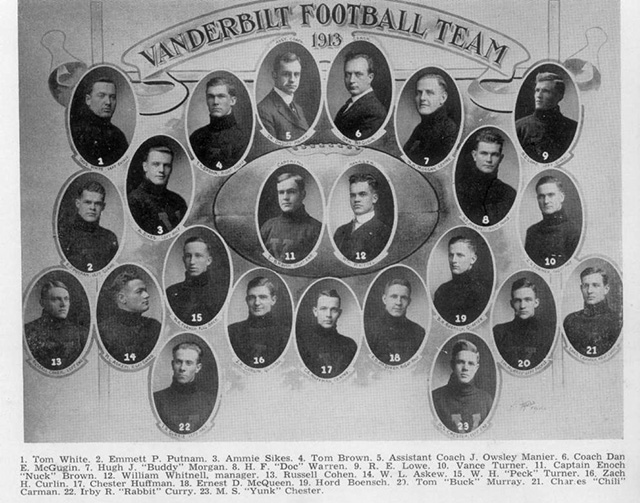
- Conference: Southern Intercollegiate Athletic Association
- Record: 5–3 (3–1 SIAA)
- Head coach: Dan McGugin (10th season)
- Offensive scheme: Short punt
- Captain: Enoch Brown
- Home stadium: Dudley Field

1913 Southern Intercollegiate Athletic Association football standings
	Conf.					Overall
Team	W		L		T	W		L		T
Auburn $	8	–	0	–	0	8	–	0	–	0
Mississippi A&M	5	–	1	–	1	6	–	1	–	1
Georgia	3	–	1	–	0	6	–	2	–	0
Vanderbilt	3	–	1	–	0	5	–	3	–	0
Georgia Tech	5	–	2	–	0	7	–	2	–	0
Alabama	4	–	3	–	0	6	–	3	–	0
LSU	1	–	1	–	2	6	–	1	–	2
Sewanee	2	–	2	–	0	4	–	3	–	0
Florida	2	–	2	–	0	4	–	3	–	0
Clemson	2	–	4	–	0	4	–	4	–	0
Mississippi College	1	–	2	–	0	6	–	3	–	0
Tennessee	1	–	3	–	0	6	–	3	–	0
The Citadel	0	–	3	–	1	3	–	4	–	2
Mercer	0	–	4	–	1	2	–	5	–	1
Kentucky	0	–	1	–	0	6	–	2	–	0
Texas A&M	0	–	1	–	1	3	–	4	–	2
Central University	0	–	2	–	0	2	–	5	–	0
Tulane	0	–	4	–	0	3	–	5	–	0
$ – Conference champion

The 1913 Vanderbilt Commodores football team represented Vanderbilt University in the 1913 Southern Intercollegiate Athletic Association football season. The 1913 season was Dan McGugin's 10th year as head coach. Members of the Southern Intercollegiate Athletic Association, the Commodores played six home games in Nashville, Tennessee and finished the season with a record of 5–3 overall and 3–1 in conference play.

== Schedule ==
Date	Opponent	Site	Result	Source
October 4	Maryville (TN)*	Dudley Field; Nashville, TN	W 59–0	
October 11	Central University	Dudley Field; Nashville, TN	W 48–0	
October 18	Henderson-Brown*	Dudley Field; Nashville, TN	W 33–0	
October 25	Michigan*	Dudley Field; Nashville, TN	L 2–33	
November 1	at Virginia*	Lambeth Field; Charlottesville, VA	L 0–34	
November 8	Tennessee	Dudley Field; Nashville, TN (rivalry)	W 7–6	
November 15	at Auburn	Rickwood Field; Birmingham, AL	L 6–14	
November 27	Sewanee	Dudley Field; Nashville, TN (rivalry)	W 63–13	
*Non-conference game

== Game summaries ==
=== Michigan ===
On October 25, 1913, Michigan played Vanderbilt in Nashville, Tennessee. The game matched Michigan head coach Fielding H. Yost against his former player and brother-in-law, Dan McGugin. Owing to the relationship between Yost and McGugin, the two teams played nine times between 1905 and 1923, with Michigan winning eight times. Michigan won the 1913 game, 33–2, in the worst defeat for Vanderbilt since McGugin became the head coach. The game was marked by the Wolverines' most extensive use of the forward pass during the 1913 season. Michigan's air attack was described as showing "dazzling proficiency", as the forward passes were responsible for four of Michigan's five touchdowns. In the Detroit Free Press, E. A. Batchelor wrote: "Vanderbilt fairly gasped in amazement as the Wolverines shot the ball from one to another with the precision of baseball players."

=== Virginia ===
Virginia blanked the Commodores, 34–0.

=== Tennessee ===
Red Rainey scored Tennessee's touchdown. Goat Carroll missed the kick. Tennessee's right guard S. D. Bayer drew a 33-yard, half the distance to the goal penalty for slugging, and was ejected by umpire Bradley Walker. The first down after, Hord Boensch threw a touchdown pass to Enoch Brown. Brown ran the last ten yards shaking off several defenders. Boensch kicked goal and won the game for Vanderbilt. One account reads "'Red' Rainey shone for Tennessee, though he was later relegated to the side lines after a collision with one A. Sikes, Esq., otherwise known as the "Roaring Representative from Williamson."

=== Auburn ===
The Commodores lost to the SIAA champion Auburn Tigers 14–6.
