= 1913 Mercer Baptists football team =

American college football season

1913 Mercer Baptists football
- Conference: Southern Intercollegiate Athletic Association
- Record: 2–5–1 (0–4–1 SIAA)
- Head coach: Lewie Hardage (1st season)
- Home stadium: Central City Park

1913 Southern Intercollegiate Athletic Association football standings
	Conf.					Overall
Team	W		L		T	W		L		T
Auburn $	8	–	0	–	0	8	–	0	–	0
Mississippi A&M	5	–	1	–	1	6	–	1	–	1
Georgia	3	–	1	–	0	6	–	2	–	0
Vanderbilt	3	–	1	–	0	5	–	3	–	0
Georgia Tech	5	–	2	–	0	7	–	2	–	0
Alabama	4	–	3	–	0	6	–	3	–	0
LSU	1	–	1	–	2	6	–	1	–	2
Sewanee	2	–	2	–	0	4	–	3	–	0
Florida	2	–	2	–	0	4	–	3	–	0
Clemson	2	–	4	–	0	4	–	4	–	0
Mississippi College	1	–	2	–	0	6	–	3	–	0
Tennessee	1	–	3	–	0	6	–	3	–	0
The Citadel	0	–	3	–	1	3	–	4	–	2
Mercer	0	–	4	–	1	2	–	5	–	1
Kentucky	0	–	1	–	0	6	–	2	–	0
Texas A&M	0	–	1	–	1	3	–	4	–	2
Central University	0	–	2	–	0	2	–	5	–	0
Tulane	0	–	4	–	0	3	–	5	–	0
$ – Conference champion

The 1913 Mercer Baptists football team was an American football team that represented Mercer University as a member of the Southern Intercollegiate Athletic Association (SIAA) during the 1913 college football season. In their first year under head coach Lewie Hardage, the team compiled an 2–5–1 record, with a mark of 0–4–1 in the SIAA.

== Schedule ==
Date	Opponent	Site	Result	Source
October 4	at Auburn	Drake Field; Auburn, AL	L 0–53	
October 11	10th District AC*	Central City Park; Macon, GA	W 44–0	
October 18	at Georgia Tech	Grant Field; Atlanta, GA	L 0–33	
October 25	The Citadel	Central City Park; Macon, GA	T 7–7	
November 1	Alabama Presbyterian*	Central City Park; Macon, GA	W 33–0	
November 7	vs. Stetson*	Jacksonville, FL	L 6–13	
November 17	Clemson	Central City Park; Macon, GA	L 0–52	
November 27	at Florida	University Field; Gainesville, FL	L 0–24	
*Non-conference game
