= 1913 Mississippi College Collegians football team =

American college football season

1913 Mississippi College Collegians football
- Conference: Southern Intercollegiate Athletic Association
- Record: 6–3 (1–2 SIAA)
- Head coach: Dana X. Bible (1st season)

1913 Southern Intercollegiate Athletic Association football standings
	Conf.					Overall
Team	W		L		T	W		L		T
Auburn $	8	–	0	–	0	8	–	0	–	0
Mississippi A&M	5	–	1	–	1	6	–	1	–	1
Georgia	3	–	1	–	0	6	–	2	–	0
Vanderbilt	3	–	1	–	0	5	–	3	–	0
Georgia Tech	5	–	2	–	0	7	–	2	–	0
Alabama	4	–	3	–	0	6	–	3	–	0
LSU	1	–	1	–	2	6	–	1	–	2
Sewanee	2	–	2	–	0	4	–	3	–	0
Florida	2	–	2	–	0	4	–	3	–	0
Clemson	2	–	4	–	0	4	–	4	–	0
Mississippi College	1	–	2	–	0	6	–	3	–	0
Tennessee	1	–	3	–	0	6	–	3	–	0
The Citadel	0	–	3	–	1	3	–	4	–	2
Mercer	0	–	4	–	1	2	–	5	–	1
Kentucky	0	–	1	–	0	6	–	2	–	0
Texas A&M	0	–	1	–	1	3	–	4	–	2
Central University	0	–	2	–	0	2	–	5	–	0
Tulane	0	–	4	–	0	3	–	5	–	0
$ – Conference champion

The 1913 Mississippi College Collegians football team was an American football team that represented Mississippi College as a member of the Southern Intercollegiate Athletic Association (SIAA) in the 1913 college football season. Led by Dana X. Bible in his first season as head coach, the team compiled an overall record of 6–3 and with a mark of 1–2 against SIAA competition.

== Schedule ==
Date	Opponent	Site	Result	Attendance	Source
October 4	Pearl River County Agricultural High School*	Clinton, MS	W 67–0		
October 10	at Mississippi A&M	Hardy Field; Starkville, MS	L 13–14		
October 18	at Tulane	Tulane Stadium; New Orleans, LA	W 13–3		
October 25	at Ouachita Baptist*	Arkadelphia, AR	W 22–14		
October 28	at Henderson-Brown*	Arkadelphia, AR	W 7–2		
November 1	vs. Alabama	Mississippi State Fairgrounds; Jackson, MS	L 3–21	6,000	
November 7	at Marion*	Marion Field; Marion, AL	L 0–7		
November 14	at Louisiana Industrial*	Athletic Field; Ruston, LA	W 7–3		
November 27	vs. Howard (AL)*	Mississippi State Fairgrounds; Jackson, MS	W 10–6	2,500	
*Non-conference game
