= Tennessee–Vanderbilt football rivalry =

American college football rivalry

Vanderbilt–Tennessee football rivalry
- Tennessee Volunteers Vanderbilt Commodores
- First meeting: October 21, 1892; Vanderbilt, 22–4
- Latest meeting: November 29, 2025; Vanderbilt, 45–24
- Next meeting: November 28, 2026

Statistics
- Total meetings: 120
- All-time series: Tennessee leads, 79–33–5
- Largest victory: Vanderbilt, 76–0 (1918)
- Longest win streak: Tennessee, 22 (1983–2004)
- Current win streak: Vanderbilt, 1 (2025–present)
- Current unbeaten streak: Vanderbilt, 1 (2025–present)

Locations of Tennessee and Vanderbilt

The Vanderbilt–Tennessee football rivalry is an American college football rivalry between the Tennessee Volunteers and Vanderbilt Commodores. They are both founding members of the Southeastern Conference (SEC). Vanderbilt and Tennessee have played 119 times since 1892. Tennessee leads the all-time series 79–33–5.

== History ==
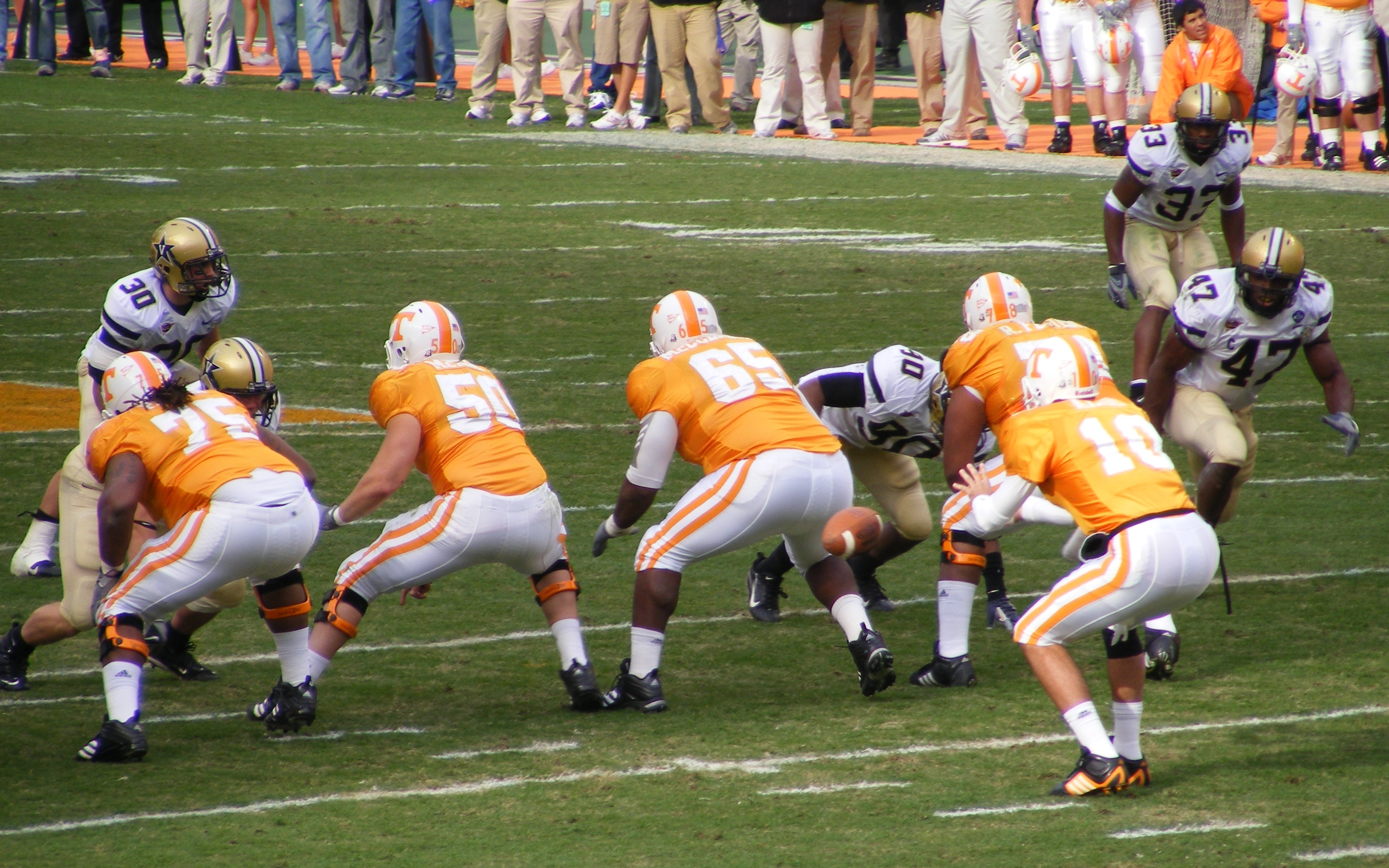
Tennessee vs. Vanderbilt 2007

From 1892–1927, Vanderbilt went 19–2–3 against Tennessee. Tennessee's hiring of Robert Neyland in 1926 reversed completely the on field rivalry. Nathan Dougherty hired him with the explicit goal to "even the score with Vanderbilt." Vanderbilt's Dan McGugin (1904–17, 1919–34) was 13–8–3 all-time against the Vols.

Vanderbilt's longest win streak is 9 from 1901 to 1913. Tennessee's longest win streak is 22 from 1983 to 2004.

From 1928 to 2011, Tennessee went 71–9–2 against Vanderbilt. Since 2012, Tennessee leads 8–6 on the field.

An unofficial, exhibition game was played in 1918 between Vanderbilt and Student Army Training Corps, since Tennessee had officially suspended their football program due to Tennessee's coach and players participation in World War I.

== Game results ==
Tennessee victories	Vanderbilt victories	Tie games

No.	Date	Location	Winning team		Losing team	
1	October 21, 1892	Nashville	Vanderbilt	22	Tennessee	4
2	November 17, 1892	Knoxville	Vanderbilt	12	Tennessee	0
3	October 22, 1900	Nashville	Tie	0	Tie	0
4	November 9, 1901	Nashville	Vanderbilt	22	Tennessee	0
5	October 25, 1902	Nashville	Vanderbilt	12	Tennessee	5
6	October 17, 1903	Nashville	Vanderbilt	40	Tennessee	0
7	November 5, 1904	Nashville	Vanderbilt	22	Tennessee	0
8	October 21, 1905	Nashville	Vanderbilt	45	Tennessee	0
9	November 7, 1908	Nashville	Vanderbilt	16	Tennessee	9
10	November 6, 1909	Nashville	Vanderbilt	51	Tennessee	0
11	October 15, 1910	Nashville	Vanderbilt	18	Tennessee	0
12	November 8, 1913	Nashville	Vanderbilt	7	Tennessee	6
13	November 7, 1914	Knoxville	Tennessee	16	Vanderbilt	14
14	October 30, 1915	Nashville	Vanderbilt	35	Tennessee	0
15	November 11, 1916	Knoxville	Tennessee	10	Vanderbilt	6
16	November 9, 1918	Nashville	Vanderbilt^{†}	76	Tennessee	0
17	October 11, 1919	Nashville	Tie	3	Tie	3
18	October 9, 1920	Knoxville	Vanderbilt	20	Tennessee	0
19	October 29, 1921	Nashville	Vanderbilt	14	Tennessee	0
20	November 4, 1922	Knoxville	Vanderbilt	14	Tennessee	6
21	November 10, 1923	Nashville	Vanderbilt	51	Tennessee	7
22	October 17, 1925	Nashville	Vanderbilt	34	Tennessee	7
23	November 14, 1926	Nashville	Vanderbilt	20	Tennessee	3
24	November 13, 1927	Knoxville	Tie	7	Tie	7
25	November 12, 1928	Nashville	Tennessee	6	Vanderbilt	0
26	November 16, 1929	Knoxville	Tennessee	13	Vanderbilt	0
27	November 15, 1930	Nashville	Tennessee	13	Vanderbilt	0
28	November 14, 1931	Knoxville	Tennessee	21	Vanderbilt	7
29	November 12, 1932	Nashville	Tie	0	Tie	0
30	November 18, 1933	Knoxville	Tennessee	33	Vanderbilt	6
31	November 17, 1934	Nashville	Tennessee	13	Vanderbilt	6
32	November 16, 1935	Knoxville	Vanderbilt	13	Tennessee	7
33	November 14, 1936	Nashville	Tennessee	26	Vanderbilt	13
34	November 13, 1937	Knoxville	Vanderbilt	13	Tennessee	7
35	November 12, 1938	Nashville	#4 Tennessee	14	Vanderbilt	0
36	November 18, 1939	Knoxville	#1 Tennessee	13	Vanderbilt	0
37	November 30, 1940	Nashville	#6 Tennessee	20	Vanderbilt	0
38	November 29, 1941	Knoxville	Tennessee	26	#12 Vanderbilt	7
39	November 28, 1942	Nashville	#10 Tennessee	19	Vanderbilt	7
40	December 1, 1945	Knoxville	#17 Tennessee	45	Vanderbilt	0
41	November 30, 1946	Nashville	#8 Tennessee	7	Vanderbilt	6
42	November 29, 1947	Knoxville	Tennessee	12	Vanderbilt	7
43	November 27, 1948	Nashville	#15 Vanderbilt	28	Tennessee	6
44	November 26, 1949	Knoxville	#18 Tennessee	26	Vanderbilt	20
45	December 2, 1950	Nashville	#9 Tennessee	43	Vanderbilt	0
46	December 1, 1951	Knoxville	#1 Tennessee	35	Vanderbilt	27
47	November 29, 1952	Nashville	#9 Tennessee	46	Vanderbilt	0
48	November 28, 1953	Knoxville	Tennessee	33	Vanderbilt	6
49	November 27, 1954	Nashville	Vanderbilt	26	Tennessee	0
50	November 26, 1955	Knoxville	Tennessee	20	#19 Vanderbilt	14
51	December 1, 1956	Nashville	#2 Tennessee	16	Vanderbilt	0
52	November 30, 1957	Knoxville	#18 Tennessee	28	Vanderbilt	0
53	November 29, 1958	Nashville	Tennessee	10	#15 Vanderbilt	6
54	November 28, 1959	Knoxville	Vanderbilt	14	Tennessee	0
55	November 26, 1960	Nashville	Tennessee	35	Vanderbilt	0
56	December 2, 1961	Knoxville	Tennessee	41	Vanderbilt	7
57	December 1, 1962	Nashville	Tennessee	30	Vanderbilt	0
58	November 30, 1963	Knoxville	Tennessee	14	Vanderbilt	0
59	November 28, 1964	Nashville	Vanderbilt	7	Tennessee	0
60	November 27, 1965	Knoxville	#9 Tennessee	21	Vanderbilt	3
61	November 26, 1966	Nashville	Tennessee	28	Vanderbilt	0

No.	Date	Location	Winning team		Losing team	
62	December 2, 1967	Knoxville	#2 Tennessee	41	Vanderbilt	14
63	November 28, 1968	Nashville	#7 Tennessee	17	Vanderbilt	10
64	November 29, 1969	Knoxville	#10 Tennessee	40	Vanderbilt	27
65	November 30, 1970	Nashville	#7 Tennessee	24	Vanderbilt	6
66	November 27, 1971	Knoxville	#11 Tennessee	19	Vanderbilt	7
67	December 2, 1972	Nashville	#12 Tennessee	30	Vanderbilt	10
68	December 1, 1973	Knoxville	#19 Tennessee	20	Vanderbilt	17
69	November 30, 1974	Nashville	Tie	21	Tie	21
70	November 29, 1975	Knoxville	Vanderbilt	17	Tennessee	14
71	November 27, 1976	Nashville	Tennessee	13	Vanderbilt	10
72	November 26, 1977	Knoxville	Tennessee	42	Vanderbilt	7
73	December 2, 1978	Nashville	Tennessee	41	Vanderbilt	15
74	December 1, 1979	Knoxville	Tennessee	31	Vanderbilt	10
75	November 29, 1980	Nashville	Tennessee	51	Vanderbilt	13
76	November 28, 1981	Knoxville	Tennessee	38	Vanderbilt	34
77	November 27, 1982	Nashville	Vanderbilt	28	Tennessee	21
78	November 26, 1983	Knoxville	Tennessee	34	Vanderbilt	24
79	December 1, 1984	Nashville	Tennessee	29	Vanderbilt	13
80	November 30, 1985	Knoxville	#10 Tennessee	30	Vanderbilt	0
81	November 29, 1986	Nashville	Tennessee	35	Vanderbilt	20
82	November 28, 1987	Knoxville	#16 Tennessee	38	Vanderbilt	36
83	November 26, 1988	Nashville	Tennessee	14	Vanderbilt	7
84	December 2, 1989	Knoxville	#8 Tennessee	17	Vanderbilt	10
85	December 1, 1990	Nashville	#12 Tennessee	49	Vanderbilt	20
86	November 30, 1991	Knoxville	#9 Tennessee	45	Vanderbilt	0
87	November 28, 1992	Nashville	#18 Tennessee	29	Vanderbilt	25
88	November 27, 1993	Knoxville	#6 Tennessee	62	Vanderbilt	14
89	November 26, 1994	Nashville	Tennessee	65	Vanderbilt	0
90	November 25, 1995	Knoxville	#5 Tennessee	12	Vanderbilt	7
91	November 30, 1996	Nashville	#9 Tennessee	14	Vanderbilt	7
92	November 29, 1997	Knoxville	#3 Tennessee	17	Vanderbilt	10
93	November 28, 1998	Nashville	#1 Tennessee	41	Vanderbilt	0
94	November 27, 1999	Knoxville	#6 Tennessee	38	Vanderbilt	10
95	November 25, 2000	Nashville	#25 Tennessee	28	Vanderbilt	26
96	November 24, 2001	Knoxville	#7 Tennessee	38	Vanderbilt	0
97	November 23, 2002	Nashville	Tennessee	24	Vanderbilt	0
98	November 22, 2003	Knoxville	#9 Tennessee	48	Vanderbilt	0
99	November 20, 2004	Nashville	#15 Tennessee	38	Vanderbilt	33
100	November 19, 2005	Knoxville	Vanderbilt	28	Tennessee	24
101	November 18, 2006	Nashville	#22 Tennessee	39	Vanderbilt	10
102	November 17, 2007	Knoxville	#19 Tennessee	25	Vanderbilt	24
103	November 22, 2008	Nashville	Tennessee	20	Vanderbilt	10
104	November 21, 2009	Knoxville	Tennessee	31	Vanderbilt	16
105	November 20, 2010	Nashville	Tennessee	24	Vanderbilt	10
106	November 19, 2011	Knoxville	Tennessee	27	Vanderbilt	21^{OT}
107	November 17, 2012	Nashville	Vanderbilt	41	Tennessee	18
108	November 23, 2013	Knoxville	Vanderbilt	14	Tennessee	10
109	November 29, 2014	Nashville	Tennessee	24	Vanderbilt	17
110	November 28, 2015	Knoxville	Tennessee	53	Vanderbilt	28
111	November 26, 2016	Nashville	Vanderbilt	45	#17 Tennessee	34
112	November 25, 2017	Knoxville	Vanderbilt	42	Tennessee	24
113	November 24, 2018	Nashville	Vanderbilt	38	Tennessee	13
114	November 30, 2019	Knoxville	Tennessee^{††}	28	Vanderbilt	10
115	December 12, 2020	Nashville	Tennessee^{††}	42	Vanderbilt	17
116	November 27, 2021	Knoxville	Tennessee	45	Vanderbilt	21
117	November 26, 2022	Nashville	#10 Tennessee	56	Vanderbilt	0
118	November 25, 2023	Knoxville	#21 Tennessee	48	Vanderbilt	24
119	November 30, 2024	Nashville	#8 Tennessee	36	Vanderbilt	23
120	November 29, 2025	Knoxville	#14 Vanderbilt	45	#19 Tennessee	24
Series: Tennessee leads 79–33–5
† The 1918 game was an exhibition due to Tennessee suspending their football program due to player and coach participation in World War I. †† Tennessee vacated the 2019 and 2020 wins due to recruiting violations under former head coach Jeremy Pruitt.

== Notable games ==
=== 1892: The rivalry's first two games ===
1892 saw the first ever matchup between the Vanderbilt Commodores and the Tennessee Volunteers. The two schools played each other twice during the year; Vanderbilt won both games. On the first matchup; for the Volunteers it was their third ever game in the second season of play and their first season with more than one game. For the Commodores it was their seventh ever game and third season of play.

The first game was played in Nashville on October 21, 1892. The Volunteers only managed one score as the Commodores rolled to a 22–4 victory. The second game was played in Knoxville on November 17. The Vols did not manage a single score as Vanderbilt won 12–0. The captain of Vanderbilt was Elliott Jones and its quarterback was William E. Beard.

=== 1900: Tie at Vanderbilt jubilee ===
A game was played between the schools as part of Vanderbilt's celebrations surrounding its 25th anniversary. It ended a scoreless tie.

=== 1902: Edgerton scores ===
1902 had one of Tennessee's strongest early elevens. Vanderbilt won 12–5 despite a weak line due to its running game. John Edgerton scored both Vanderbilt touchdowns. Tennessee's only score was provided by an A. H. Douglas run around right end, breaking two tackles and getting the touchdown. Nash Buckingham had a 40-yard run through the line. Jones Beene blocked and tackled well.

=== 1908: Vandy wins despite Leach ===
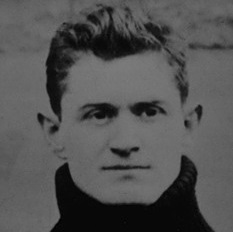
Ray Morrison saved a touchdown in 1908.

1908 was a down year for Vanderbilt with a wealth of sophomores; guided by McGugin to its success. The Volunteers had compiled four wins in conference play. It was widely considered the best Tennessee football season up to that point. Vanderbilt won the match between the two schools 16–9.

Walker Leach made a 41-yard field goal to put the Vols up 4–0. "This seemed to arouse the local team" and Vanderbilt drove down the field for a touchdown. On a fake kick, Leach circled Vanderbilt's left end for 60 yards. Ray Morrison stopped him short of the goal. Nathan Dougherty was on Tennessee's squad.

=== 1913: Tennessee mistakes help Vanderbilt ===
Red Rainey scored Tennessee's touchdown. Goat Carroll missed the kick. Tennessee's right guard S. D. Bayer drew a 33-yard, half the distance to the goal penalty for slugging, and was ejected by umpire Bradley Walker. The first down after, Hord Boensch threw a touchdown pass to Enoch Brown. Brown ran the last ten yards shaking off several defenders. Boensch kicked goal and won the game for Vanderbilt.

=== 1914: UT's first victory ===
In 1914, Tennessee was undefeated Southern Intercollegiate Athletic Association (SIAA) champions. It was the first championship of any kind for the Tennessee program. The 1914 Vols were retroactively awarded a national championship by 1st-N-Goal, though this remains largely unrecognized. Alonzo "Goat" Carroll scored all of Tennessee's points in the 16–14 victory, Tennessee's first over Vandy.

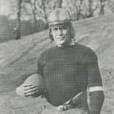
Graham Vowell.

An account of the first touchdown reads, "Four minutes of play had barely drifted by when Tennessee's weird, mystic, elusive forward pass, May to Carroll, deadly in accuracy, went sailing home for the first touchdown of the game. The chesty Tennessee quarterback sent the oval whizzing for a distance of thirty-five yards and Carroll gathered in the ball near his goal line, when he hurried beneath the posts with all the speed at his command."

=== 1916: UT surprises ===
Tennessee upset Vanderbilt 10–6 in 1916. Vanderbilt's lone score came on a 70-yard run by Rabbit Curry. The year's only unanimous All-Southern Graham Vowell scored Tennessee's winning touchdown. Tennessee and Georgia Tech finished the season as conference co-champions.

=== 1918: Exhibition ===
In 1918, Vanderbilt beat Tennessee's SATC by what would've been its largest ever margin; 76–0. Grailey Berryhill scored six touchdowns. UT had suspended their football program for World War I, and the game was played by Student Army Training Corps. Tennessee does not officially recognize the game; however, Vanderbilt does.

=== 1919: A tie in the rain ===
A steady rain soaked spectators and both squads. The contest ended tied at three. Josh Cody scored on a 30-yard drop kick, while Buck Hatcher made a 25-yard drop kick.

=== 1920: Vanderbilt avenges '16 on Waite Field ===
In what was expected to be a hard match, the Commodores got vengeance for Curry, who died in aerial combat over France during the First World War, and lost to Tennessee on Waite Field in 1916, by netting a 20 to 0 victory at the Vols' home field. All three of Vandy's touchdowns were owed to passes from Jess Neely to Gink Hendrick.

=== 1921: Kuhn acts as captain ===
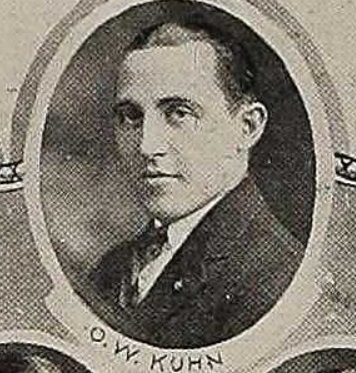
Doc Kuhn.

The Vanderbilt Commodores went undefeated in 1921. Vanderbilt played the Tennessee Volunteers on a soggy Old Dudley Field, winning by a score of 14 to 0. Team captain Pink Wade did not play due to a case of lumbago. Acting as the captain in his absence, Doc Kuhn scored all of Vanderbilt's touchdowns. Fatty Lawrence also did not play in the game. Tennessee was excited for the game, preparing for weeks with new plays and persistent drilling. It was said Vanderbilt was "the one team that Tennessee enjoys defeating."

During the first quarter, an end run of about 20 yards from Kuhn first made the score 7–0. In the second, after the Commodores obtained good field position from the punt returns of Rupert Smith, Kuhn had a 30 or 35-yard touchdown run utilizing Lynn Bomar as a lead blocker.

At one point in the second half, Freddie "Froggie" Meiers carried an onside kick over for a touchdown, but it was called back. The Tennessee backs were repeatedly thrown for no gain or losses all game, and steady improvement from the Commodore eleven had been noticed.

=== 1922: Vanderbilt triumphs at Shields–Watkins Field ===
The Vanderbilt Commodores were undefeated conference champions in the first year of the Southern Conference. The Commodores beat Tennessee at Knoxville by a score of 14 to 6. The eighteenth meeting between Vanderbilt and Tennessee saw a packed stadium, the largest crowd of the season for Shields–Watkins Field. It was Vanderbilt's first game at the new stadium, which opened September 24, 1921.

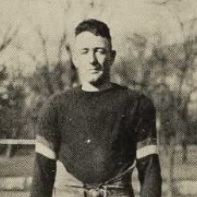
Roe Campbell.

Tennessee was out for revenge, as they had only beaten the Commodores twice, and Vanderbilt was ahead in points scored in the series by a vast margin, 347 to 53. Tennessee also hoped to better its Southern Conference record after having lost to Georgia. Both teams had last week rested their starters, Vanderbilt winning over Mercer, and Tennessee beating Mississippi by a score of 49 to 0. It was therefore thought the game should be a closer one than in years past, with Vanderbilt only slight favorites. The game turned out to be hotly contested, so much so that many felt Vanderbilt was outplayed but not outfought. Perhaps the week off for many Commodore starters had hindered Vanderbilt's ability to play its best.

Tennessee drove down to the 7-yard line in the first quarter, but was held on downs. The first score came from Vanderbilt in the second quarter on a 31-yard touchdown pass from Jess Neely to Doc Kuhn. Wakefield kicked goal.

In the fourth quarter, Tennessee got to the 1-yard line after a series of long passes. Tennessee fullback Roe Campbell charged over the line for the touchdown. The Volunteers' Clayton failed to kick goal. Later in the fourth, Vanderbilt intercepted a Tennessee pass in Volunteer territory, leading to a chance to score. After runs at the line failed, a 5-yard pass from Neely to Lynn Bomar got the touchdown. Hek Wakefield's try was successful.

Lynn Bomar, Scotty Neill, Gil Reese, and Fatty Lawrence were mentioned as the players of the game for the Commodores, and Campbell was cited as the star for the Volunteers. It was said Neill out-punted the Volunteers on nearly every occasion. The Nashville Banner said Lawrence had been "in there doing a man's job blocking a kick and tackling with the deadliness of a tiger unleashed in a cave of lions."

=== 1923: Vanderbilt unleashes pent up fury ===
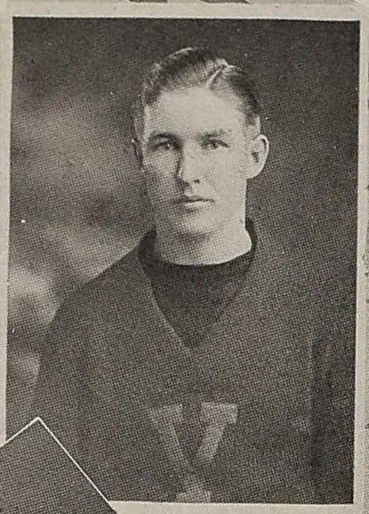
Gil Reese.

After two undefeated seasons and a scoreless tie with Michigan, hopes were high going into the 1923 season. Michigan this year were national champions and edged out the Commodores 3–0. Vanderbilt then was upset by Texas. The week before the Tennessee game, Vanderbilt suffered a scoreless tie with Mississippi A&M in the rain. With a 51–7 victory over the Tennessee Volunteers the next week, the Commodores regained "all the power and smoothness with which it had started the 1923 season." Ralph McGill reflected the sentiment, "All the pent-up fury of misunderstanding and disappointment burst out like a flood. The Vols might as well have flung themselves in the way of a runaway train. It was a machine that found itself. The power was there and the Commodores took a fierce joy in using it." The Volunteers were led by M. B. Banks, in his third year as head coach.

Vanderbilt gained 455 yards of total offense. Gil Reese rushed for 214 yards, as well as 95 yards on punt returns. Reese scored five times, with touchdown runs of 70 yards, 45 yards, and 29 yards respectively. Red Rountree scored another, a 63-yard run. Captain Doc Kuhn got the other touchdown, and Wakefield made a drop kick. Lynn Bomar, Alf Sharpe, and Bob Rives on defense helped hold the Volunteers to only 7. With the win Vanderbilt was still a contender for the Southern title. J. G. Lowe played best for Tennessee, getting its lone touchdown.

=== 1927: Dodson gets Neyland a tie ===
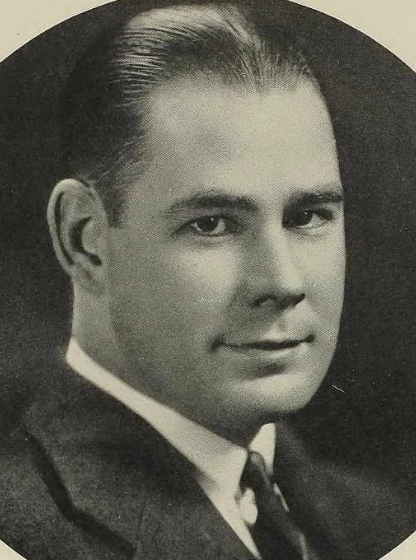
Coach Neyland.

In 1927, two hall of fame coaches without a conference loss battle to a tie. Robert Neyland was hired to coach Tennessee in 1926 by Nathan Dougherty with the explicit goal to "even the score with Vanderbilt." 1927 is his first great team, tying with others as victors of the Southern Conference. Dan McGugin's Commodores led 7–0 until a late Dick Dodson run tied the score. "After the game McGugin questioned each of his players as to his whereabouts during the run. Without exception the players claimed that two men had blocked them. McGugin shrugged. "Well, we'll just protest the play. It's perfectly obvious that Tennessee had twenty-two men on the field."

=== 1928: Vols pass to victory ===
Tennessee remained undefeated on the season with a 6–0 victory over Vanderbilt; its first win in the series since 1916. Before 1928, Vanderbilt held a strong advantage over the Volunteers with a record of 18–2–3. Since 1928, Tennessee has dominated the rivalry.

The crowd of 22,000 was the largest ever to see a game in Tennessee up to that point. A 16-yard pass from Roy Witt to Paul Hug in the second quarter was the lone score of the contest. Jimmy Armistead ran all over Tennessee, once stopped short of the goal by Witt. Buddy Hackman provided strong defense against the forward pass.

=== 1932: A scoreless tie ===
Clyde Roberts outrushed Beattie Feathers as the SoCon champion Vols tied the Commodores 0–0. The game's lone scoring play was a catch by Feathers, called out of bounds in front of the Vanderbilt bench.

=== 1982: Vandy's last win of the century ===
The game was billed as the “Super Bowl of Tennessee” between Vanderbilt and Tennessee. Tickets were reportedly selling for $150.00 each. The game was a sellout; 41,683 fans and 3,800 watched on closed circuit TV. Both teams swapped the lead back and forth; neither team led by more than seven points. The whole time the game was played it rained, drenching the field. The whole season Taylor took advantage of the short pass. Vanderbilt was able to throw the bomb that won the game. Taylor passed for two 42-yard passes for a touchdown. Whit Taylor made a 65-yard pass to Phil Roach to set up the game-winning one-yard run from Whit Taylor. The run was a quarterback keeper around the right end following a fake to Keith Edwards. Vanderbilt held on to win 28–21. This would be Vandy's last win over the Volunteers in the 20th century, beginning a 22-game losing streak which wouldn't end until 2005.

=== 1987: The comeback ===
The Volunteers overcame a 28–3 second quarter deficit to defeat the Commodores by a score of 38–36.

=== 1992: Vols send Majors out a winner ===
Tennessee defeated Vanderbilt by a score of 29–25 in Johnny Majors' last game as head coach of the Vols. Majors would be replaced by assistant coach Phillip Fulmer who would coach the team until 2008.

=== 1994: Tennessee's largest victory ===
In Nashville, the Vols dominated the Commodores en route to a 65–0 blowout win, the largest margin of victory by the Volunteers in the history of the rivalry. UT running back James Stewart gained 121 yards on 12 carries to become the Vols' all-time leading rusher and Tennessee set a school record with 665 total yards of offense.

=== 2000: Close but no cigar ===
Vandy overcame a 21–6 fourth quarter deficit thanks largely to the play of quarterback Greg Zolman but the Commodores came up short in a 28–26 loss. The Southeastern Conference's least penalized team that year, the Vols committed a season-high 14 penalties for 135 yards and also had three turnovers. The two-point victory was the smallest margin of victory for the Vols over the Commodores since 1992.

=== 2005: Cutler ends Vols' longest win streak ===
The Commodores ended their season, and Jay Cutler's Vanderbilt career, at Tennessee against the Volunteers with a 28–24 win. The victory was Vanderbilt's first over the Volunteers since 1982, the year before Cutler was born. The win also marked Vanderbilt's first victory over Tennessee on the Volunteers' home field in Knoxville since 1975. Cutler passed for three touchdowns and 315 yards during the game, becoming the first quarterback in school history to record four consecutive 300-yard passing performances. Cutler's final play in college was the game-winning (and streak-ending) touchdown pass to teammate Earl Bennett against Tennessee.

=== 2019: Volunteers end three-game losing streak to Vanderbilt ===
Tennessee ended a three-game losing streak to Vanderbilt 28–10 on a stormy evening in Knoxville. True freshman running back Eric Gray rushed for 246 yards on 25 carries and had three rushing touchdowns. Gray had the fifth-highest single-game rushing total ever by a Tennessee player. Tennessee finished the regular season 7–5 and 5–3 in conference play. The win sealed the Volunteers' first winning record in conference play since the 2015 season.

=== 2025: Both teams are ranked for the first time ===
Tennessee was ranked #19 and Vanderbilt was ranked #14. The Commodores defeated the Volunteers 45–24. This was the first meeting where both teams were ranked. With quarterback Diego Pavia, who threw for 268 yards and rushed for 165 yards, and running back Sedrick Alexander, who rushed for 115 rushing yards, the Commodores generated 582 yards of total offense. With the victory, Vanderbilt secured their football program’s first 10-win season. It also marked the Commodores' highest-scoring performance against the Volunteers since 1923. Vanderbilt would go on to accept a bid to the Reliaquest Bowl. Tennessee was knocked out of the College Football Playoff and AP Poll’s Top 25 rankings before falling to Illinois in the Music City Bowl. Vanderbilt quarterback Diego Pavia would go on to be the Heisman Trophy runner up.

== See also ==
- List of NCAA college football rivalry games
- List of most-played college football series in NCAA Division I
