= 1913 Alabama Crimson Tide football team =

American college football season

1913 Alabama Crimson Tide football
- Conference: Southern Intercollegiate Athletic Association
- Record: 6–3 (4–3 SIAA)
- Head coach: D. V. Graves (3rd season)
- Captain: Hargrove Van de Graaff
- Home stadium: The Quad; Rickwood Field

1913 Southern Intercollegiate Athletic Association football standings
	Conf.					Overall
Team	W		L		T	W		L		T
Auburn $	8	–	0	–	0	8	–	0	–	0
Mississippi A&M	5	–	1	–	1	6	–	1	–	1
Georgia	3	–	1	–	0	6	–	2	–	0
Vanderbilt	3	–	1	–	0	5	–	3	–	0
Georgia Tech	5	–	2	–	0	7	–	2	–	0
Alabama	4	–	3	–	0	6	–	3	–	0
LSU	1	–	1	–	2	6	–	1	–	2
Sewanee	2	–	2	–	0	4	–	3	–	0
Florida	2	–	2	–	0	4	–	3	–	0
Clemson	2	–	4	–	0	4	–	4	–	0
Mississippi College	1	–	2	–	0	6	–	3	–	0
Tennessee	1	–	3	–	0	6	–	3	–	0
The Citadel	0	–	3	–	1	3	–	4	–	2
Mercer	0	–	4	–	1	2	–	5	–	1
Kentucky	0	–	1	–	0	6	–	2	–	0
Texas A&M	0	–	1	–	1	3	–	4	–	2
Central University	0	–	2	–	0	2	–	5	–	0
Tulane	0	–	4	–	0	3	–	5	–	0
$ – Conference champion

The 1913 Alabama Crimson Tide football team (variously "Alabama", "UA" or "Bama") represented the University of Alabama in the 1913 Southern Intercollegiate Athletic Association football season. It was the Crimson Tide's 21st overall and 18th season as a member of the Southern Intercollegiate Athletic Association (SIAA). The team was led by head coach D. V. Graves, in his third year, and played their home games at the University of Alabama Quad in Tuscaloosa and at Rickwood Field in Birmingham, Alabama. They finished the season with a record of six wins and three losses (6–3 overall, 4–3 in the SIAA).

== Schedule ==
Date	Opponent	Site	Result	Attendance	Source
September 27	Howard (AL)*	The Quad; Tuscaloosa, AL	W 27–0		
October 4	Birmingham*	The Quad; Tuscaloosa, AL	W 81–0		
October 11	Clemson	The Quad; Tuscaloosa, AL (rivalry)	W 20–0		
October 18	Georgia	Rickwood Field; Birmingham, AL (rivalry)	L 0–20		
October 25	at Tulane	First Tulane Stadium; New Orleans, LA	W 26–0		
November 1	vs. Mississippi College	Mississippi State Fairgrounds; Jackson, MS	W 21–3	6,000	
November 9	Sewanee	Rickwood Field; Birmingham, AL	L 7–10		
November 14	Tennessee	The Quad; Tuscaloosa, AL (Third Saturday in October)	W 6–0		
November 27	Mississippi A&M	Rickwood Field; Birmingham, AL (rivalry)	L 0–7		
*Non-conference game

== Game summaries ==
Alabama opened the season with three consecutive, shutout victories over Howard (now Samford University), Birmingham College (now Birmingham–Southern College) and Clemson. The 81 points against Birmingham set a new school record. Bama lost their first game of the season against Georgia. After a pair of road victories against Tulane and Mississippi College, Alabama finished their season with a win against Tennessee and losses against Sewanee and Mississippi A&M (now Mississippi State University).
