= 1913 Florida Gators football team =

American college football season

1913 Florida Gators football
- Conference: Southern Intercollegiate Athletic Association
- Record: 4–3 (2–2 SIAA)
- Head coach: George E. Pyle (5th season)
- Captain: Louis Tenney
- Home stadium: University Athletic Field

1913 Southern Intercollegiate Athletic Association football standings
	Conf.					Overall
Team	W		L		T	W		L		T
Auburn $	8	–	0	–	0	8	–	0	–	0
Mississippi A&M	5	–	1	–	1	6	–	1	–	1
Georgia	3	–	1	–	0	6	–	2	–	0
Vanderbilt	3	–	1	–	0	5	–	3	–	0
Georgia Tech	5	–	2	–	0	7	–	2	–	0
Alabama	4	–	3	–	0	6	–	3	–	0
LSU	1	–	1	–	2	6	–	1	–	2
Sewanee	2	–	2	–	0	4	–	3	–	0
Florida	2	–	2	–	0	4	–	3	–	0
Clemson	2	–	4	–	0	4	–	4	–	0
Mississippi College	1	–	2	–	0	6	–	3	–	0
Tennessee	1	–	3	–	0	6	–	3	–	0
The Citadel	0	–	3	–	1	3	–	4	–	2
Mercer	0	–	4	–	1	2	–	5	–	1
Kentucky	0	–	1	–	0	6	–	2	–	0
Texas A&M	0	–	1	–	1	3	–	4	–	2
Central University	0	–	2	–	0	2	–	5	–	0
Tulane	0	–	4	–	0	3	–	5	–	0
$ – Conference champion

The 1913 Florida Gators football team represented the University of Florida during the 1913 Southern Intercollegiate Athletic Association football season. The season was George Pyle's fifth and last as the head coach of the Florida Gators football team. Pyle's 1913 Florida Gators completed their eighth varsity football season with an overall record of 4–3 and their fourth year in the Southern Intercollegiate Athletic Association (SIAA) with a conference record of 2–2.

The 144–0 defeat of Florida Southern is the largest in school history.

== Schedule ==
Date	Opponent	Site	Result	Source
October 6	Southern College*	University Field; Gainesville, FL	W 144–0	
October 11	at Auburn	Drake Field; Auburn, AL (rivalry)	L 0–55	
October 18	Maryville (TN)*	University Field; Gainesville, FL	W 39–0	
October 25	vs. Georgia Tech	Barrs Field; Jacksonville, FL	L 3–13	
November 8	at South Carolina*	Melton Field; Columbia, SC	L 0–13	
November 15	The Citadel	University Field; Gainesville, FL	W 18–13	
November 27	Mercer	University Field; Gainesville, FL	W 24–0	
*Non-conference game

== Game summaries ==
=== Florida Southern ===
The highlight of the Gators' 1913 campaign was a 144–0 victory over Florida Southern, still the most lopsided game in program history despite shortening the quarters from 15 to 12 minutes each. Back Harvey Hester scored 7 touchdowns, a record which also still stands, while Louis Tenney scored five touchdowns; Swanson three, and future team captain Rex Farrior scored a touchdown in his first collegiate game.

=== Auburn ===
Florida at Auburn

Team	1	2	3	4	Total
Florida	0	0	0	0	0
• Auburn	13	21	7	14	55

- Date: October 11
- Location: Drake Field • Auburn, AL
- Game weather: Hot
- Referee: John Counselman

The defeat of Florida Southern was followed five days later by a 55–0 loss to an Auburn Tigers team that finished its season undefeated and untied. Auburn scored five touchdowns in the first half. Captain Kirk Newell retired in the third period due to the heat.

The starting lineup was Henderson (left end), Coarsey (left tackle), Sutton (left guard), Price (center), Bullock (right guard), Ward (right tackle), Buie (right end), Swanson (quarterback), Lawler (left halfback), Hester (right halfback), Tenney (fullback).

=== Maryville ===
In the third week of play, Florida overwhelmed Maryville, 39–0, using several forward passes. Price made two field goals, including one of 40 yards.

=== Georgia Tech ===
Georgia Tech at Florida

Team	1	2	3	4	Total
• Ga. Tech	0	0	7	6	13
Florida	3	0	0	0	3

- Date: October 25
- Location: Barrs Field • Jacksonville, FL
- Referee: Penton

Coach John Heisman's Georgia Tech team defeated Florida 3–13. Heisman said the Gators played the best football he'd seen a Florida squad play. Florida scored first with a 30-yard placekick field goal from Price. In the third quarter, a 25-yard pass from Homer Cook to Cushman netted a touchdown for the Yellow Jackets. Cook scored again in the final period.

The starting lineup was Buie (left end), Coarsey (left tackle), Sutton (left guard), Price (center), Lotspeich (right guard), Hancock (right tackle), Henderson (right end), Mosley (quarterback), Tenney (left halfback), Hester (right halfback), Swanson (fullback).

=== South Carolina ===
The South Carolina Gamecocks beat the visiting Gators 13–0 in a steady rain. Florida's star back Harvey Hester had been suspended by the university for missing class, but Coach Pyle brought him to Columbia anyway, where he played under the name "Burnett". University president Albert Murphree was unamused by Pyle's "skullduggery", and the incident played a part in the coach's dismissal at the end of the season.

=== The Citadel ===
The Citadel at Florida

Team	1	2	3	4	Total
The Citadel	0	7	0	6	13
• Florida	12	0	6	0	18

- Date: November 15
- Location: University Field • Gainesville, FL

The Gators defeated The Citadel 18–13 in a close game. Buie and Hester scored in the first period. Citadel came back in the second quarter with a long pass from Weeks to Bolton. In the third quarter, Buie blocked a Citadel kick, leading to another touchdown. Another pass got Citadel's final touchdown.

=== Mercer ===
The Gators also defeated the Mercer Baptists, 24–0, for their first win in six games against the Baptists. Captain Tenney was the feature of the contest.

== Postseason ==
George Pyle finished his five-year tenure as the coach of the Florida Gators with an overall record of 26–7–3. After leaving Florida, Pyle became the athletic director of the West Virginia Mountaineers. John Sutton was elected captain for next season.

== Personnel ==
=== Line ===
Player	Position	Games started	High school	Height	Weight	Age
Sam Buie	end					
Cappleman	guard					
James Coarsey	tackle					
W. H. Crom	guard					
Rex Farrior	guard		Hillsborough	5'9"	168	17
Henry Freeman	end					
Roy Hancock	tackle					
W. B. Henderson	end					
Daddy Lotspiech	guard			5'10"	165	22
J. A. Miller	end					
T. E. Price	center					
John Sutton	tackle			6'0"	185	22
F. M. Swanson	center					

=== Backfield ===
Player	Position	Games started	High school	Height	Weight	Age
Trux Bullock	fullback					
Paul Burnett	halfback					
Harvey Hester	halfback					
Jack Lawless	fullback					
George Moseley	quarterback					
Rammy Ramsdell	quarterback		Hillsborough	5'10"	148	19
Alex Shaw	halfback					
Joe Swanson	fullback			6'0"	165	20
Louis E. Tenny	halfback					

== Bibliography ==
- Horne, Larry E. (2012). Florida Gators IQ. ISBN 1-4499-8947-0.
- McEwen, Tom (1974). The Gators: A Story of Florida Football. Huntsville, Alabama: The Strode Publishers. ISBN 0-87397-025-X.
