= 1913 Auburn Tigers football team =

American college football season

1913 Auburn Tigers football
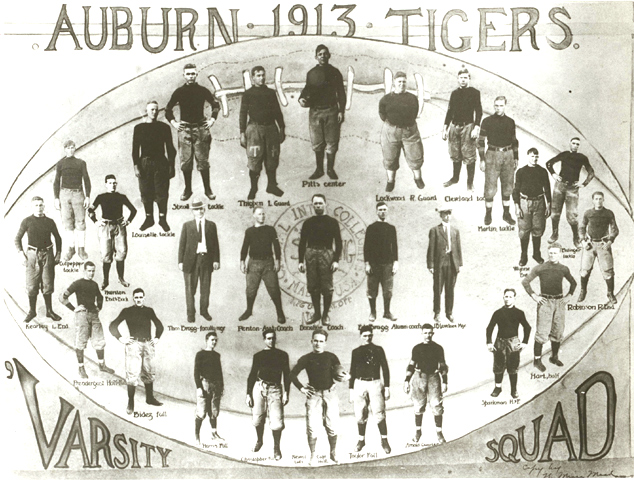

National champion (Billingsley MOV) SIAA champion
- Conference: Southern Intercollegiate Athletic Association
- Record: 8–0 (8–0 SIAA)
- Head coach: Mike Donahue (9th season)
- Base defense: 7–2–2
- Captain: Kirk Newell
- Home stadium: Drake Field; Rickwood Field

Uniform
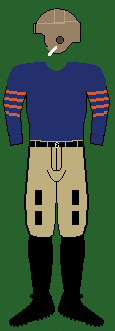

1913 Southern Intercollegiate Athletic Association football standings
	Conf.					Overall
Team	W		L		T	W		L		T
Auburn $	8	–	0	–	0	8	–	0	–	0
Mississippi A&M	5	–	1	–	1	6	–	1	–	1
Georgia	3	–	1	–	0	6	–	2	–	0
Vanderbilt	3	–	1	–	0	5	–	3	–	0
Georgia Tech	5	–	2	–	0	7	–	2	–	0
Alabama	4	–	3	–	0	6	–	3	–	0
LSU	1	–	1	–	2	6	–	1	–	2
Sewanee	2	–	2	–	0	4	–	3	–	0
Florida	2	–	2	–	0	4	–	3	–	0
Clemson	2	–	4	–	0	4	–	4	–	0
Mississippi College	1	–	2	–	0	6	–	3	–	0
Tennessee	1	–	3	–	0	6	–	3	–	0
The Citadel	0	–	3	–	1	3	–	4	–	2
Mercer	0	–	4	–	1	2	–	5	–	1
Kentucky	0	–	1	–	0	6	–	2	–	0
Texas A&M	0	–	1	–	1	3	–	4	–	2
Central University	0	–	2	–	0	2	–	5	–	0
Tulane	0	–	4	–	0	3	–	5	–	0
$ – Conference champion

The 1913 Auburn Tigers football team represented Auburn University in the 1913 Southern Intercollegiate Athletic Association football season. The team was coached by Mike Donahue and was undefeated at 8–0, outscoring opponents 224–13. Auburn was the champion of the Southern Intercollegiate Athletic Association. The team played just two games at home.

Richard Billingsley is the only NCAA-recognized "major selector" to select Auburn as 1913 national champion. The retroactive selection of the 1913 Tigers first appeared in the 2000 NCAA records book, as the Billingsley Report revised its math system for the BCS computer rankings. In the 1996 NCAA records book, under his primary methodology, he had selected Chicago for 1913. (Note: Billingsley Report selections first appeared in the 1995 edition of the NCAA records book, listing champions since 1960. In the 1996 book these champions were joined with retrospective selections all the way back to 1869. This original set of champions was last printed in the 1999 NCAA records book. In 1998 Billingsley adjusted his formula in order to participate as a computer poll in the Bowl Championship Series rankings. He re-ranked all past seasons with this new formula; these new champions were printed in the 2000–2003 NCAA records books. It was in this set of selections that the 1913 Auburn Tigers first appeared.) Auburn did not claim the title until 2025, but did acknowledge it in its official media guide before then.

== Before the season ==
Since Auburn's tie with Vanderbilt last year, teams other than Vanderbilt had a chance to win a title, and newspapers covered football more than the World Series for the first time.

Coach Donahue built his team around his defense, which played out of a 7–2–2 scheme. The team was led by senior captain Kirk Newell. One source reads "Coach Donahue loved the fullback dive and would run the play over and over again before sending the elusive Newell wide on a sweep."

== Schedule ==
Date	Opponent	Site	Result	Attendance	Source
October 4	Mercer	Drake Field; Auburn, AL	W 53–0		
October 11	Florida	Drake Field; Auburn, AL (rivalry)	W 55–0		
October 18	at Clemson	Bowman Field; Calhoun, SC (rivalry)	W 20–0		
October 25	Mississippi A&M	Rickwood Field; Birmingham, AL	W 34–0		
November 1	vs. LSU	Monroe Park; Mobile, AL (rivalry)	W 7–0		
November 8	at Georgia Tech	Grant Field; Atlanta, GA (rivalry)	W 20–0		
November 15	Vanderbilt	Rickwood Field; Birmingham, AL	W 14–6		
November 22	at Georgia	Ponce de Leon Park; Atlanta, GA (rivalry)	W 21–7	12,000	

== Game summaries ==
=== Mercer ===
A.P.I. began its season with a 53-0 blowout against visiting Mercer on Drake Field.

=== Florida ===
Florida at Auburn

Team	1	2	3	4	Total
Florida	0	0	0	0	0
• Auburn	13	21	7	14	55

- Date: October 11
- Location: Drake Field • Auburn, Alabama
- Game weather: Hot
- Referee: John Counselman

The week before, the Florida Gators had the largest win in their history, a 144–0 win over Southern College. Auburn crushed the Gators 55–0. Auburn scored five touchdowns in the first half. Captain Kirk Newell retired in the third period due to the heat.

The starting lineup was Wynne (left end), Esslinger (left tackle), Lockwood (left guard), Pitts (center), Thigpen (right guard), Louisell (right tackle), Robinson (right end), Arnold (quarterback), Newell (left halfback), Sparkman (right halfback), Harris (fullback).

=== Mississippi A&M ===
The second place Mississippi A&M Aggies fell to Auburn 34–0 after years of close games between the two schools.

=== Clemson ===
Clemson was defeated 20–0 with coach Donahue using his fullback.

The starting lineup was Wynne (left end), Esslinger (left tackle), Lockwood (left guard), Pitts (center), Thigpen (right guard), Louisell (right tackle), Robinson (right end), Arnold (quarterback), Newell (left halfback), Sparkman (right halfback), Harris (fullback).

=== LSU ===
LSU at Auburn

Team	1	2	3	4	Total
LSU	0	0	0	0	0
• Auburn	0	0	7	0	7

- Date: November 1
- Location: Mobile, Alabama
- Game start: 2:30 p. m.
- Referee: Innis Brown

In a close game of conventional football, Auburn beat the LSU Tigers 7–0, with Tom Dutton standing out at center of defense. Kirk Newell starred with end runs, and in the third quarter brought the ball to the 12-yard line with a 40-yard run. Red Harris eventually made the deciding score.

The starting lineup was Taylor (left end), Louisell (left tackle), Thigpen (left guard), Pitts (center), Lockwood (right guard), Esslinger (right tackle), Robinson (right end), Arnold (quarterback), Newell (left halfback), Kearley (right halfback), Harris (fullback).

=== Georgia Tech ===
Auburn beat Georgia Tech 20–0, Auburn's sixth straight shutout. After the first half, Tech's line was beaten down by Auburn's.

=== Vanderbilt ===
Auburn at Vanderbilt

Team	1	2	3	4	Total
• Auburn	7	0	0	7	14
Vanderbilt	6	0	0	0	6

- Location: Nashville, Tennessee

In "one of the most spectacular games the South ever saw", Auburn beat Dan McGugin's Vanderbilt Commodores 14–6. Auburn scored with fullback Hart. Vanderbilt responded quickly with a 30-yard pass from Ammie Sikes to Hord Boensch. Using four different fullbacks on one drive, Auburn drove 80 yards to win.

=== Georgia ===
Auburn at Georgia

Team	1	2	3	4	Total
• Auburn	0	7	7	7	21
Georgia	7	0	0	0	7

- Date: November 22
- Location: Ponce de Leon Park
  Atlanta
- Game attendance: 12,000
- Referee: Innis Brown

The Tigers defeated the Georgia Bulldogs 21–7 to claim the SIAA title. Many prominent persons, including the governor, saw the contest.

Kirk Newell of Auburn and Bob McWhorter of Georgia played their last games. At the 25-yard line, from a freak formation, Georgia's David Paddock pass the ball to Logan who caught it on the run and into the endzone for the first score of the game. Red Harris got over a score in the second period. In the third quarter, Auburn had driven to the 11-yard line, and Donahue pulled Harris for Christopher. The Georgia team expected a buck, and committed to stopping it. Newell skirted around right end for 7 yards. Christopher eventually plunged in from the 4-yard line. Later, from the 35-yard line, Newell had a run to the 7-yard line, chased out of bounds by McWhorter. Christopher again got the touchdown.

The starting lineup was Kearley (left end), Louisell (left tackle), Thigpen (left guard), Pitts (center), Lockwood (right guard), Esslinger (right tackle), Robinson (right end), Arnold (quarterback), Newell (left halfback), Prendergast (right halfback), Harris (fullback).

== Postseason ==
Newell gained 1,707 yards that year, 46% of the team's entire offensive output; and 5,800 yards rushing, 350 yards receiving, and 1,200 yards on punt returns for his career. One writer claims "Auburn had a lot of great football teams, but there may not have been one greater than the 1913–1914 team." Newell went on to be a World War I hero and member of the Alabama Sports Hall of Fame.

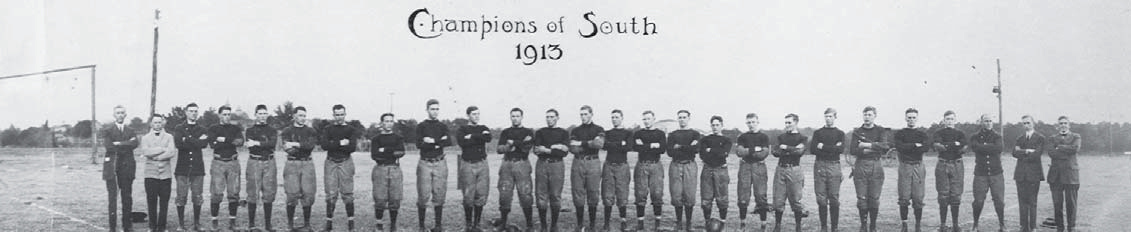
The Champions of the South

== Roster ==
=== Starters ===
==== Line ====
Player	Position	Games started	Hometown	Prep school	Height	Weight	Age
M. S. Esslinger	Tackle	4					
Bull Kearley	End	2	Franklin, Alabama			180	22
Tubby Lockwood	Guard	4	Montgomery, Alabama			220	23
Lou Louisell	Tackle	4					18
Boozer Pitts	Center	4	Pittsview, Alabama			190	19
Robbie Robinson	End	4				170	
Baby Taylor	End	1	Birmingham, Alabama		6'2"	194	21
Big Thigpen	Guard	4				200	
Jack Wynne	End	2					

==== Backfield ====
Player	Position	Games started	Hometown	Prep school	Height	Weight	Age
Ted Arnold	Quarterback	4				156	
Red Harris	Fullback	4				148	
Kirk Newell	Halfback	4	Dadeville, Alabama			150	22
Homer Prendergast	Halfback	1					
S. S. Sparkman	Halfback	3					

=== Subs ===
Player	Position	Games started	Hometown	Prep school	Height	Weight	Age
E. C. Adkins	Halfback						
Bedie Bidez	Fullback						
Chris Christopher	Fullback						
Cleveland	Halfback						
C. W. Culpepper	Tackle						
Roland Fricks	Guard						
Lucy Hairston	End/back		Crawford, Mississippi				
Frank Hart	Fullback		Eufaula, Alabama				19
C. B. Martin	Tackle						
C. S. Noble	Quarterback						
George Steed	Tackle						

== Staff ==
- Mike Donahue, coach
- George Penton, assistant
- Ed Bragg, alumni coach
- Jonathan Bell Lovelace, manager
- Thomas Bragg, graduate manager
- Dean Cliff Hare, faculty chairman of athletics
