= 1913 Georgia Bulldogs football team =

American college football season

1913 Georgia Bulldogs football
- Conference: Southern Intercollegiate Athletic Association
- Record: 6–2 (3–1 SIAA)
- Head coach: W. A. Cunningham (4th season)
- Captain: Bob McWhorter
- Home stadium: Sanford Field

Uniform
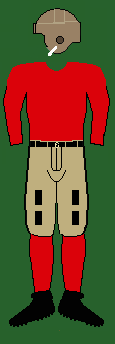

1913 Southern Intercollegiate Athletic Association football standings
	Conf.					Overall
Team	W		L		T	W		L		T
Auburn $	8	–	0	–	0	8	–	0	–	0
Mississippi A&M	5	–	1	–	1	6	–	1	–	1
Georgia	3	–	1	–	0	6	–	2	–	0
Vanderbilt	3	–	1	–	0	5	–	3	–	0
Georgia Tech	5	–	2	–	0	7	–	2	–	0
Alabama	4	–	3	–	0	6	–	3	–	0
LSU	1	–	1	–	2	6	–	1	–	2
Sewanee	2	–	2	–	0	4	–	3	–	0
Florida	2	–	2	–	0	4	–	3	–	0
Clemson	2	–	4	–	0	4	–	4	–	0
Mississippi College	1	–	2	–	0	6	–	3	–	0
Tennessee	1	–	3	–	0	6	–	3	–	0
The Citadel	0	–	3	–	1	3	–	4	–	2
Mercer	0	–	4	–	1	2	–	5	–	1
Kentucky	0	–	1	–	0	6	–	2	–	0
Texas A&M	0	–	1	–	1	3	–	4	–	2
Central University	0	–	2	–	0	2	–	5	–	0
Tulane	0	–	4	–	0	3	–	5	–	0
$ – Conference champion

The 1913 Georgia Bulldogs football team represented the University of Georgia during the 1913 Southern Intercollegiate Athletic Association football season. The Bulldogs completed the season with a 6–2 record. This team played Virginia for the first time since the tragic game of 1897 in which a Richard Von Albade Gammon died. Georgia also played its first game in Georgia Tech's new stadium (Grant Field), coming away with a victory. The 108–0 victory over Alabama Presbyterian in the first game of the season represents the largest margin of victory in Georgia football history.

Senior captain Bob McWhorter became the first player to be selected as an All-American for the Bulldogs after the 1913 season.

== Schedule ==
Date	Opponent	Site	Result	Attendance	Source
October 4	Alabama Presbyterian*	Sanford Field; Athens, GA	W 108–0		
October 11	North Georgia*	Sanford Field; Athens, GA	W 51–0		
October 18	Alabama	Rickwood Field; Birmingham, AL (rivalry)	W 20–0		
October 25	vs. Virginia*	Ponce de Leon Park; Atlanta, GA	L 6–13		
November 1	North Carolina*	Sanford Field; Athens, GA	W 19–6		
November 6	vs. Clemson	Augusta, GA (rivalry)	W 18–15		
November 15	at Georgia Tech	Grant Field; Atlanta, GA (rivalry)	W 14–0		
November 22	vs. Auburn	Ponce de Leon Park; Atlanta, GA (rivalry)	L 7–21	12,000	
*Non-conference game
