= SS Fort Lee =

World War II American T2 tanker

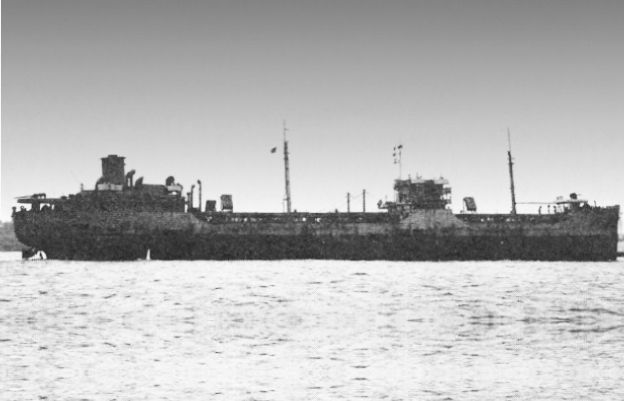
- SS Fort Lee

History

United States
- Name: Fort Lee
- Namesake: Fort Lee, New Jersey and; Fort Lee, Virginia (now Fort Gregg-Adams)
- Owner: WSA
- Operator: Bernuth Lembcke Co.
- Builder: Sun Shipbuilding and Drydock Company; Chester, Pennsylvania
- Laid down: 24 October 1942
- Launched: 25 February 1943
- In service: 15 March 1943
- Out of service: 2 November 1944
- Fate: Torpedoed and sunk on 2 November 1944

General characteristics
- Class & type: T2-SE-A1 tanker
- Tonnage: 10,198
- Displacement: 21,880 long tons (22,230 t)
- Length: 523 ft 6 in (159.56 m)
- Beam: 68 ft (21 m)
- Draft: 31 ft (9.4 m)
- Propulsion: turbo-electric propulsion, 6,000 shp (4,500 kW); maximum power of 7,240 hp (5,400 kW)
- Speed: 16 knots (30 km/h)
- Range: 12,600 nautical miles (23,300 km)
- Capacity: 141,200 bbl (~19,300 t) liquid cargo; 15,200 cu ft (430 m^{3}) dry cargo
- Complement: 26 Naval Armed Guards
- Crew: 46 merchant seamen
- Armament: 1 × 5-inch/38-caliber gun; 1 × 3-inch/50-caliber gun; 8 × 20 mm AA guns

SS Fort Lee was a T2 tanker built for the United States Maritime Commission during World War II. The ship was assigned by the War Shipping Administration for operation by the Bernuth Lembcke Co. and operated in the Atlantic and Mediterranean early in its career.

Fort Lee was torpedoed and sunk by the German submarine U-181 in the Indian Ocean on 2 November 1944. Nine men aboard Fort Lee were killed during the attack. Three of the four successfully launched lifeboats were rescued by other ships within two weeks. The fate of the fourth lifeboat, with 16 men aboard, was unearthed by researchers in 2000. The boat had drifted 2,850 miles (2,480 nmi; 4,590 km) over 10 weeks before landing on Japanese-held Sumba Island with three men remaining. All three perished in custody of the Japanese.

== Operational history ==
Fort Lee (MC Hull #327) was laid down on 24 October 1942 at Sun Shipbuilding in Chester, Pennsylvania; launched on 25 February 1943; and delivered on 15 March 1943.

After launching, Fort Lee initially operated in the Mediterranean Sea and Atlantic Ocean. The ship departed New York on 28 May 1943 for Gibraltar, arriving in mid-June. In July, Fort Lee left Gibraltar and steamed for Avonmouth, which it reached later in the month. In mid-August, the tanker sailed from Liverpool and arrived at New York again on 28 August.

=== Sinking and rescue ===
In late October 1944, Fort Lee left Abadan, Iran, headed to Brisbane, Australia, with 93 thousand barrels (~12,700 t) of Navy Bunker C fuel as well as rubber and some ores. Some time on 1 November 1944, U-181 under Kapitän zur See Kurt Freiwald spotted the tanker, sailing alone in a zig-zag pattern. After moving in a straight line path for a time, U-181 was able to get ahead of Fort Lee and in a position to fire upon her.

At 20:02 on 2 November 1944, U-181 fired a single torpedo that hit Fort Lee under the port quarter and destroyed her boilers, stopping her engines and flooding the fire room. Two men in the engine room were killed by the torpedo. At 20:18, as lifeboats #3 and #5 were being lowered into the water, a second torpedo hit the starboard quarter. Two men aboard Fort Lee were killed by the second blast. Lifeboat #3 was destroyed by this torpedo, killing 6 of 7 men aboard, and lifeboat #5 was broken in half, dumping its men into the ocean. Lifeboats #1, #2, #4, and #6 were successfully launched and recovered the survivors from #3 and #5. Fort Lee succumbed to the attack stern first at 21:10 at position 27°35′S 83°11′E.

U-181 surfaced and intercepted the four remaining lifeboats, interrogating them as to cargo and destination. Although the crew refused to answer any questions, the U-boat's skipper gave the Fort Lee crew a flare gun and flares, some blankets, food, and medicine, and allowed the boats to go on their way.

The four boats were traveling within sight of each other for several days before lifeboat #4 with 16 men aboard disappeared from sight on 5 November.

On 7 November, five days after the tanker went down, 16 men in lifeboat #2 – including Master of the Fort Lee, Ottar Andersen – were rescued by the British freighter MS Ernebank and landed at Fremantle on 14 November. Two days later, on 9 November, the American tanker SS Tumacacori rescued the 17 men in lifeboat #6 and landed them at Albany on 14 November. On 16 November, two weeks after Fort Lee went down, the men in lifeboat #1 were rescued by the American Liberty ship SS Mary Ball. The gunners on Mary Ball fired upon the lifeboat before identifying it. None of the 17 men aboard were injured. Mary Ball landed the survivors at Colombo, Ceylon on 24 November.

By February 1945, all of the survivors had returned to the United States.

=== Fate of lifeboat #4 ===
For 57 years, the fate of lifeboat #4 and its occupants remained a mystery until Australian researcher Tom Hall discovered a reference to Fort Lee while researching Japanese war crimes committed against Allied prisoners of war (POWs) in what is now Indonesia.

The story, as pieced together by Hall and M. Emerson Wiles III, an employee of the U.S. Army Central Identification Laboratory is that on 13 January 1945 – 2 1/2 months after Fort Lee went down – lifeboat #4, with only three men remaining, came ashore on the south side of Japanese-held Sumba, 2,850 miles (4,600 km) from where Fort Lee sank. One of the three men, Robert F. Lanning, a member of the Naval Armed Guard contingent aboard Fort Lee, was taken to Membora, on the north side of Sumba, where he died that same day.

The names and fates of the other two men from lifeboat #4 are not known. Japanese records suggest that both men died in a Naval hospital within two weeks. But native and POW accounts suggest that the two men survived much longer. One account claims that they were executed, along with other Allied POWs, during a rampage by Japanese officers in September 1945, a month after the surrender of Japan.
