= 1913 The Citadel Bulldogs football team =

American college football season

1913 The Citadel Bulldogs football
- Conference: Southern Intercollegiate Athletic Association
- Record: 3–4–2 (0–3–1 SIAA)
- Head coach: George C. Rogers (1st season)
- Captain: Allan Bruner
- Home stadium: College Park Stadium

1913 Southern Intercollegiate Athletic Association football standings
	Conf.					Overall
Team	W		L		T	W		L		T
Auburn $	8	–	0	–	0	8	–	0	–	0
Mississippi A&M	5	–	1	–	1	6	–	1	–	1
Georgia	3	–	1	–	0	6	–	2	–	0
Vanderbilt	3	–	1	–	0	5	–	3	–	0
Georgia Tech	5	–	2	–	0	7	–	2	–	0
Alabama	4	–	3	–	0	6	–	3	–	0
LSU	1	–	1	–	2	6	–	1	–	2
Sewanee	2	–	2	–	0	4	–	3	–	0
Florida	2	–	2	–	0	4	–	3	–	0
Clemson	2	–	4	–	0	4	–	4	–	0
Mississippi College	1	–	2	–	0	6	–	3	–	0
Tennessee	1	–	3	–	0	6	–	3	–	0
The Citadel	0	–	3	–	1	3	–	4	–	2
Mercer	0	–	4	–	1	2	–	5	–	1
Kentucky	0	–	1	–	0	6	–	2	–	0
Texas A&M	0	–	1	–	1	3	–	4	–	2
Central University	0	–	2	–	0	2	–	5	–	0
Tulane	0	–	4	–	0	3	–	5	–	0
$ – Conference champion

The 1913 The Citadel Bulldogs football team represented The Citadel in the 1913 Southern Intercollegiate Athletic Association football season. This was the ninth year of intercollegiate football at The Citadel, with George C. Rogers serving as coach for the first season. All home games are believed to have been played at College Park Stadium in Hampton Park.

== Schedule ==
Date	Opponent	Site	Result	Source
September 27	Charleston Navy*	College Park Stadium; Charleston, SC	W 34–0	
October 4	Georgia Tech	College Park Stadium; Charleston, SC	L 47–0	
October 11	Porter Military Academy*	College Park Stadium; Charleston, SC	T 0–0	
October 18	College of Charleston*	College Park Stadium; Charleston, SC	W 72–0 (Note: College of Charleston played only one more game before discontinuing football at the school.)	
October 25	at Mercer	Central City Park; Macon, GA	T 7–7	
November 1	Furman*	College Park Stadium; Charleston, SC (rivalry)	W 75–0	
November 8	Clemson	College Park Stadium; Charleston, SC	L 3–7	
November 15	at Florida	University Field; Gainesville, FL	L 13–18	
November 26	at South Carolina*	Davis Field; Columbia, SC	L 13–42	
*Non-conference game
