= 1913 Georgia Tech Yellow Jackets football team =

American college football season

1913 Georgia Tech Yellow Jackets football
- Conference: Southern Intercollegiate Athletic Association
- Record: 7–2 (5–2 SIAA)
- Head coach: John Heisman (10th season)
- Offensive scheme: Jump shift
- Captain: Homer Cook
- Home stadium: Grant Field

1913 Southern Intercollegiate Athletic Association football standings
	Conf.					Overall
Team	W		L		T	W		L		T
Auburn $	8	–	0	–	0	8	–	0	–	0
Mississippi A&M	5	–	1	–	1	6	–	1	–	1
Georgia	3	–	1	–	0	6	–	2	–	0
Vanderbilt	3	–	1	–	0	5	–	3	–	0
Georgia Tech	5	–	2	–	0	7	–	2	–	0
Alabama	4	–	3	–	0	6	–	3	–	0
LSU	1	–	1	–	2	6	–	1	–	2
Sewanee	2	–	2	–	0	4	–	3	–	0
Florida	2	–	2	–	0	4	–	3	–	0
Clemson	2	–	4	–	0	4	–	4	–	0
Mississippi College	1	–	2	–	0	6	–	3	–	0
Tennessee	1	–	3	–	0	6	–	3	–	0
The Citadel	0	–	3	–	1	3	–	4	–	2
Mercer	0	–	4	–	1	2	–	5	–	1
Kentucky	0	–	1	–	0	6	–	2	–	0
Texas A&M	0	–	1	–	1	3	–	4	–	2
Central University	0	–	2	–	0	2	–	5	–	0
Tulane	0	–	4	–	0	3	–	5	–	0
$ – Conference champion

The 1913 Georgia Tech Yellow Jackets football team represented the Georgia Institute of Technology during the 1913 Southern Intercollegiate Athletic Association football season. This was the first season the team played at Grant Field.

== Schedule ==
Date	Opponent	Site	Result	Source
September 27	Camp McPherson*	Grant Field; Atlanta, GA	W 19–0	
October 4	The Citadel	Grant Field; Atlanta, GA	W 47–0	
October 11	at Chattanooga*	Chamberlain Field; Chattanooga, TN	W 71–6	
October 18	Mercer	Grant Field; Atlanta, GA	W 33–0	
October 25	vs. Florida	Barrs Field; Jacksonville, FL	W 13–3	
November 1	Sewanee	Grant Field; Atlanta, GA	W 33–0	
November 8	Auburn	Grant Field; Atlanta, GA (rivalry)	L 0-20	
November 15	Georgia	Grant Field; Atlanta, GA (rivalry)	L 0-14	
November 27	Clemson	Grant Field; Atlanta, GA (rivalry)	W 34–0	
*Non-conference game
