= 1913 Tulane Olive and Blue football team =

American college football season

1913 Tulane Olive and Blue football
- Conference: Southern Intercollegiate Athletic Association
- Record: 3–5 (0–4 SIAA)
- Head coach: A. C. Hoffman (1st season)
- Captain: Sumter Marks
- Home stadium: First Tulane Stadium

1913 Southern Intercollegiate Athletic Association football standings
	Conf.					Overall
Team	W		L		T	W		L		T
Auburn $	8	–	0	–	0	8	–	0	–	0
Mississippi A&M	5	–	1	–	1	6	–	1	–	1
Georgia	3	–	1	–	0	6	–	2	–	0
Vanderbilt	3	–	1	–	0	5	–	3	–	0
Georgia Tech	5	–	2	–	0	7	–	2	–	0
Alabama	4	–	3	–	0	6	–	3	–	0
LSU	1	–	1	–	2	6	–	1	–	2
Sewanee	2	–	2	–	0	4	–	3	–	0
Florida	2	–	2	–	0	4	–	3	–	0
Clemson	2	–	4	–	0	4	–	4	–	0
Mississippi College	1	–	2	–	0	6	–	3	–	0
Tennessee	1	–	3	–	0	6	–	3	–	0
The Citadel	0	–	3	–	1	3	–	4	–	2
Mercer	0	–	4	–	1	2	–	5	–	1
Kentucky	0	–	1	–	0	6	–	2	–	0
Texas A&M	0	–	1	–	1	3	–	4	–	2
Central University	0	–	2	–	0	2	–	5	–	0
Tulane	0	–	4	–	0	3	–	5	–	0
$ – Conference champion

The 1913 Tulane Olive and Blue football team was an American football team that represented Tulane University as a member of the Southern Intercollegiate Athletic Association (SIAA) during the 1913 college football season. In its first year under head coach A. C. Hoffman, Tulane compiled a 3–5 record.

== Schedule ==
Date	Opponent	Site	Result	Source
October 11	Jefferson College (LA)*	Tulane Stadium; New Orleans, LA	W 13–0	
October 18	Mississippi College	Tulane Stadium; New Orleans, LA	L 3–13	
October 25	Alabama	Tulane Stadium; New Orleans, LA	L 0–26	
November 1	at Saint Louis*	American League Park; St. Louis, MO	W 12–6	
November 8	at Mississippi A&M	Hardy Field; Starkville, MS	L 0–32	
November 15	Southwestern (TX)*	Tulane Stadium; New Orleans, LA	W 31–9	
November 22	at LSU	State Field; Baton Rouge, LA (rivalry)	L 0–40	
November 27	Arkansas*	Tulane Stadium; New Orleans, LA	L 0–14	
*Non-conference game
