= 1913 Texas A&M Aggies football team =

American college football season

1913 Texas A&M Aggies football
- Conference: Southern Intercollegiate Athletic Association, Texas Intercollegiate Athletic Association
- Record: 3–4–2 (0–1–1 SIAA, 3–0–1 TIAA)
- Head coach: Charley Moran (5th season)
- Home stadium: Kyle Field

1913 Southern Intercollegiate Athletic Association football standings
	Conf.					Overall
Team	W		L		T	W		L		T
Auburn $	8	–	0	–	0	8	–	0	–	0
Mississippi A&M	5	–	1	–	1	6	–	1	–	1
Georgia	3	–	1	–	0	6	–	2	–	0
Vanderbilt	3	–	1	–	0	5	–	3	–	0
Georgia Tech	5	–	2	–	0	7	–	2	–	0
Alabama	4	–	3	–	0	6	–	3	–	0
LSU	1	–	1	–	2	6	–	1	–	2
Sewanee	2	–	2	–	0	4	–	3	–	0
Florida	2	–	2	–	0	4	–	3	–	0
Clemson	2	–	4	–	0	4	–	4	–	0
Mississippi College	1	–	2	–	0	6	–	3	–	0
Tennessee	1	–	3	–	0	6	–	3	–	0
The Citadel	0	–	3	–	1	3	–	4	–	2
Mercer	0	–	4	–	1	2	–	5	–	1
Kentucky	0	–	1	–	0	6	–	2	–	0
Texas A&M	0	–	1	–	1	3	–	4	–	2
Central University	0	–	2	–	0	2	–	5	–	0
Tulane	0	–	4	–	0	3	–	5	–	0
$ – Conference champion

1913 Texas Intercollegiate Athletic Association football standings
	Conf.					Overall
Team	W		L		T	W		L		T
Texas $	4	–	0	–	0	7	–	1	–	0
Rice	2	–	0	–	0	4	–	0	–	0
Texas A&M	3	–	0	–	1	3	–	4	–	2
Austin	3	–	2	–	1	3	–	3	–	1
Polytechnic (TX)	3	–	2	–	4	3	–	2	–	4
Baylor	2	–	2	–	2	4	–	4	–	2
Trinity (TX)	2	–	5	–	1	3	–	5	–	1
Southwestern (TX)	1	–	4	–	2	1	–	5	–	2
Daniel Baker	0	–	3	–	1	1	–	4	–	2
$ – Conference champion

The 1913 Texas A&M Aggies football team was an American football team that represented the Agricultural and Mechanical College of Texas—now known as Texas A&M University—as a member of the Southern Intercollegiate Athletic Association (SIAA) and the Texas Intercollegiate Athletic Association (TIAA) during the 1913 college football season. In their fifth year under head coach Charley Moran, the Aggies compiled an overall record of 3–4–2 with marks of 0–1–1 in SIAA play and 3–0–1 against TIAA opponents.

== Schedule ==
Date	Opponent	Site	Result	Source
October 10	Trinity (TX)	Kyle Field; College Station, TX	W 7–0	
October 17	Austin	Kyle Field; College Station, TX	W 6–0	
October 24	Polytechnic (TX)	Kyle Field; College Station, TX	W 19–6	
November 1	Mississippi A&M	State Fairgrounds; Dallas, TX	L 0–6	
November 7	at Kansas State*	Ahearn Field; Manhattan, KS	L 0–12	
November 10	at Oklahoma A&M*	Stillwater, OK	L 0–3	
November 18	Haskell*	Kyle Field; College Station, TX	L 0–28	
November 22	Baylor*	Kyle Field; College Station, TX (rivalry)	T 14–14	
November 27	vs. LSU	West End Park; Houston, TX (rivalry)	T 7–7	
*Non-conference game
