= 1913 Kentucky Wildcats football team =

American college football season

1913 Kentucky Wildcats football
- Conference: Southern Intercollegiate Athletic Association
- Record: 6–2 (0–1 SIAA)
- Head coach: Alpha Brumage (1st season)
- Captain: Herschel Scott

1913 Southern Intercollegiate Athletic Association football standings
	Conf.					Overall
Team	W		L		T	W		L		T
Auburn $	8	–	0	–	0	8	–	0	–	0
Mississippi A&M	5	–	1	–	1	6	–	1	–	1
Georgia	3	–	1	–	0	6	–	2	–	0
Vanderbilt	3	–	1	–	0	5	–	3	–	0
Georgia Tech	5	–	2	–	0	7	–	2	–	0
Alabama	4	–	3	–	0	6	–	3	–	0
LSU	1	–	1	–	2	6	–	1	–	2
Sewanee	2	–	2	–	0	4	–	3	–	0
Florida	2	–	2	–	0	4	–	3	–	0
Clemson	2	–	4	–	0	4	–	4	–	0
Mississippi College	1	–	2	–	0	6	–	3	–	0
Tennessee	1	–	3	–	0	6	–	3	–	0
The Citadel	0	–	3	–	1	3	–	4	–	2
Mercer	0	–	4	–	1	2	–	5	–	1
Kentucky	0	–	1	–	0	6	–	2	–	0
Texas A&M	0	–	1	–	1	3	–	4	–	2
Central University	0	–	2	–	0	2	–	5	–	0
Tulane	0	–	4	–	0	3	–	5	–	0
$ – Conference champion

The 1913 Kentucky Wildcats football team represented the University of Kentucky as a member of the Southern Intercollegiate Athletic Association (SIAA) during the 1913 college football season. Led by first-year head coach Alpha Brumage, the Wildcats compiled an overall record of 6–2 with a mark 0–1 in SIAA play.

== Schedule ==
Date	Opponent	Site	Result	Attendance	Source
September 27	Butler*	Stoll Field; Lexington, KY	W 21–7		
October 4	at Illinois*	Illinois Field; Champaign, IL	L 0–21		
October 18	Ohio Northern*	Stoll Field; Lexington, KY	W 21–0		
October 25	Cincinnati*	Stoll Field; Lexington, KY	W 27–7		
November 1	Earlham*	Stoll Field; Lexington, KY	W 28–10		
November 8	Wilmington (OH)*	Stoll Field; Lexington, KY	W 33–0		
November 22	at Louisville*	Eclipse Park; Louisville, KY (rivalry)	W 20–0	4,000	
November 27	Tennessee	Stoll Field; Lexington, KY (rivalry)	L 7–13		
*Non-conference game
