= 1913 Central University football team =

American college football season

1913 Central University football
- Conference: Southern Intercollegiate Athletic Association
- Record: 2–5 (0–2 SIAA)
- Head coach: Patrick O'Brien (2nd season)
- Home stadium: Cheek Field

1913 Southern Intercollegiate Athletic Association football standings
	Conf.					Overall
Team	W		L		T	W		L		T
Auburn $	8	–	0	–	0	8	–	0	–	0
Mississippi A&M	5	–	1	–	1	6	–	1	–	1
Georgia	3	–	1	–	0	6	–	2	–	0
Vanderbilt	3	–	1	–	0	5	–	3	–	0
Georgia Tech	5	–	2	–	0	7	–	2	–	0
Alabama	4	–	3	–	0	6	–	3	–	0
LSU	1	–	1	–	2	6	–	1	–	2
Sewanee	2	–	2	–	0	4	–	3	–	0
Florida	2	–	2	–	0	4	–	3	–	0
Clemson	2	–	4	–	0	4	–	4	–	0
Mississippi College	1	–	2	–	0	6	–	3	–	0
Tennessee	1	–	3	–	0	6	–	3	–	0
The Citadel	0	–	3	–	1	3	–	4	–	2
Mercer	0	–	4	–	1	2	–	5	–	1
Kentucky	0	–	1	–	0	6	–	2	–	0
Texas A&M	0	–	1	–	1	3	–	4	–	2
Central University	0	–	2	–	0	2	–	5	–	0
Tulane	0	–	4	–	0	3	–	5	–	0
$ – Conference champion

The 1913 Central University football team represented Central University of Kentucky (now known as Centre College), as a member of the Southern Intercollegiate Athletic Association (SIAA), during the 1913 college football season. Led by second-year head coach, Patrick O'Brien, the team compiled an overall record of 2–5, with a mark of 0–2 in conference play.

== Schedule ==
Date	Opponent	Site	Result	Source
October 4	duPont Manual High School*	Cheek Field; Danville, KY	W 19–0	
October 11	at Vanderbilt	Dudley Field; Nashville, TN	L 0–48	
October 17	at Mississippi A&M	Columbus Fair Grounds; Columbus, MS	L 0–31	
October 25	Kentucky Military Institute*	Cheek Field; Danville, KY	W 44–0	
November 8	at Chattanooga*	Chamberlain Field; Chattanooga, TN	L 8–27	
November 20	Georgetown (KY)*	Cheek Field; Danville, KY	L 13–33	
November 27	at Transylvania*	Thomas Field; Lexington, KY	L 0–6	
*Non-conference game
