= Bernuth-Lembcke Company =

Former US Shipping Company

- Industry: Transportation and shipping
- Founded: 1918 in New York City
- Key people: Carlos Eduardo Lembcke; Oscar Max von Bernuth; George Albert Lembcke; D. K. Ludwig

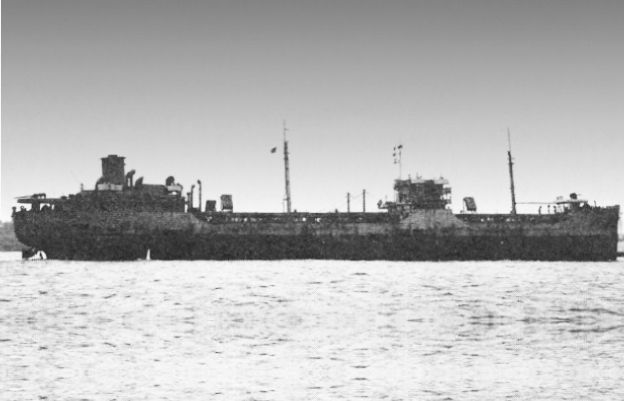
SS Fort Lee operated by Bernuth-Lembcke Company that was sunk on November 2, 1944

Bernuth-Lembcke Company was a tanker ship transportation company founded in 1918 in New York City by Oscar Max von Bernuth (O. M. Bernuth) and Carlos Eduardo Lembcke. Earlier Oscar Max von Bernuth founded his own company, Bernuth Corporation, on December 20, 1907, in at Suffolk, New York. Carlos Eduardo Lembcke. Earlier founded his own company, C. Lembeke & Company, in 1889. Bernuth-Lembcke Company were active in supporting the World War II effort, shipping fuel oil.

== History ==
Carlos Eduardo Lembcke was born on January 18, 1870, in Hamburg, Germany, Lembcke came to New York City on October 12, 1889. Lembcke became a United States naturalized citizen on September 20, 1899. Oscar Max von Bernuth was born on July 23, 1873, in Hamburg, Germany. Bernuth and came to the US in 1875 and got a job at a New York importing company. In 1898 Bernuth got a job working for Lembcke. Carlos Eduardo Lembcke's brother, George Albert Lembcke also worked at the firm as company secretary. George Lembcke became a US citizen in 1901. Carlos Eduardo Lembcke retire in 1911 and moved back to Germany and in 1913 to Genoa, Italy. In 1938 he return to United States, due to the outbreak of the war. Bernuth-Lembcke Company main route was importing creosote. Oscar Max von Bernuth was elected President of Chipman Chemical Company when R. N. Chipman stepped down in 1940.

== World War II ==
Bernuth-Lembcke Company ships were used to help the World War II effort. During World War II Bernuth-Lembcke Company operated merchant ships for the United States Shipping Board. During World War II Bernuth-Lembcke Company was active with charter shipping with the Maritime Commission and War Shipping Administration. Bernuth-Lembcke Company operated Liberty ships and T2 tankers for the merchant navy. The ship was run by its Bernuth-Lembcke Company crew and the US Navy supplied United States Navy Armed Guards to man the deck guns and radio.

== Ships ==
- Some ships owned:
- O. M. Bernuth, a 7,972-ton tanker, built and acquired in 1938, built by Sun Shipbuilding & Drydock Co. in Chester, Pennsylvania. O. M. Bernuth picked up the survivors from the tanker E. J. Bullock on October 6, 1938.
- Torres, a 4,943-ton tanker, built in 1917

Liberty ship of World War II

  - World War II operated ships:
  - Liberty ships:
- Albert G. Brown
- David Holmes
- Eliza Jane Nicholson
- SS John Stagg

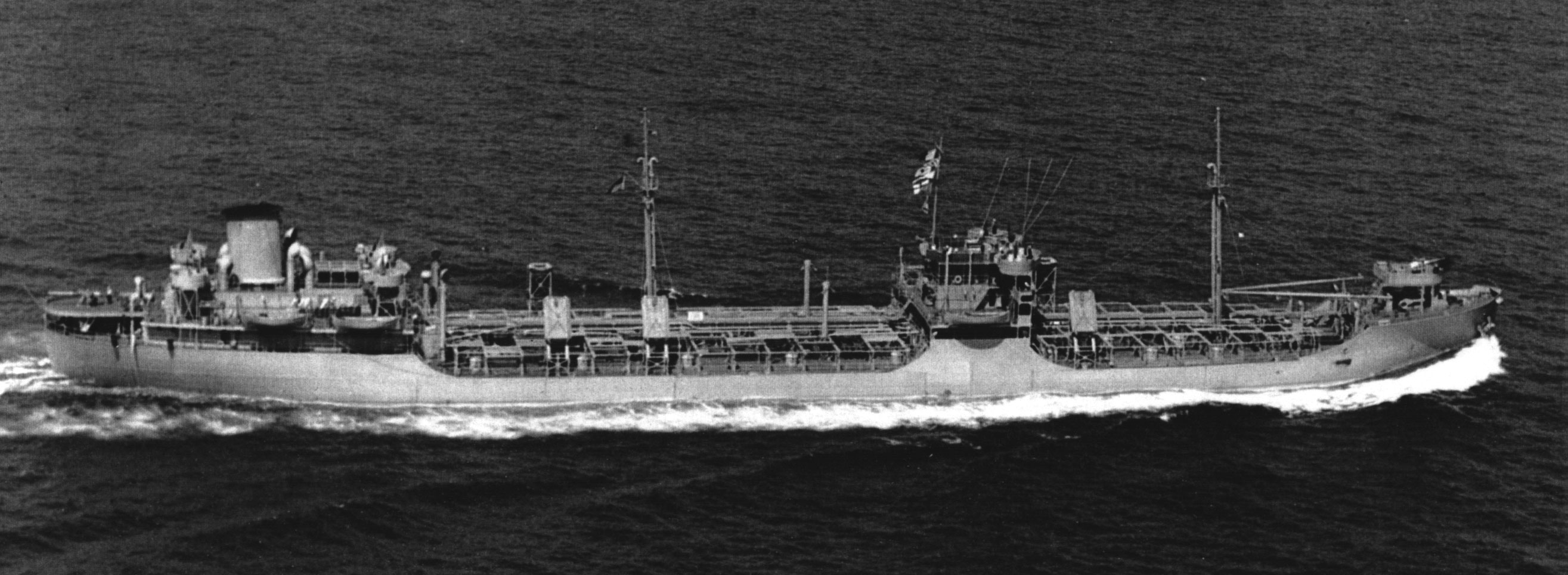
A T2 tanker in 1943

  - T2 tankers:
- SS Fort Lee, a T2-SE-A1 tanker, torpedoed and sunk by the German submarine U-181 on November 2, 1944
- Tydol Bayonne, was Catham T2-SE-A1 tanker, built in 1944 acquired in 1948
- Fullerton Hills, built in 1944 by Marinship, Sausalito, California, to Bernuth in 1948. Scrapped in 1962.

== See also ==
- List of Type T2 tankers
