= 1913 Mississippi A&M Aggies football team =

American college football season

1913 Mississippi A&M Aggies football
- Conference: Southern Intercollegiate Athletic Association
- Record: 6–1–1 (5–1–1 SIAA)
- Head coach: W. D. Chadwick (5th season)
- Home stadium: Hardy Field

1913 Southern Intercollegiate Athletic Association football standings
| | Conf. | | | | | Overall |
| Team | W | | L | | T | W | | L | | T |
|---|---|---|---|---|---|---|---|---|---|---|
| Auburn $ | 8 | – | 0 | – | 0 | 8 | – | 0 | – | 0 |
| Mississippi A&M | 5 | – | 1 | – | 1 | 6 | – | 1 | – | 1 |
| Georgia | 3 | – | 1 | – | 0 | 6 | – | 2 | – | 0 |
| Vanderbilt | 3 | – | 1 | – | 0 | 5 | – | 3 | – | 0 |
| Georgia Tech | 5 | – | 2 | – | 0 | 7 | – | 2 | – | 0 |
| Alabama | 4 | – | 3 | – | 0 | 6 | – | 3 | – | 0 |
| LSU | 1 | – | 1 | – | 2 | 6 | – | 1 | – | 2 |
| Sewanee | 2 | – | 2 | – | 0 | 4 | – | 3 | – | 0 |
| Florida | 2 | – | 2 | – | 0 | 4 | – | 3 | – | 0 |
| Clemson | 2 | – | 4 | – | 0 | 4 | – | 4 | – | 0 |
| Mississippi College | 1 | – | 2 | – | 0 | 6 | – | 3 | – | 0 |
| Tennessee | 1 | – | 3 | – | 0 | 6 | – | 3 | – | 0 |
| The Citadel | 0 | – | 3 | – | 1 | 3 | – | 4 | – | 2 |
| Mercer | 0 | – | 4 | – | 1 | 2 | – | 5 | – | 1 |
| Kentucky | 0 | – | 1 | – | 0 | 6 | – | 2 | – | 0 |
| Texas A&M | 0 | – | 1 | – | 1 | 3 | – | 4 | – | 2 |
| Central University | 0 | – | 2 | – | 0 | 2 | – | 5 | – | 0 |
| Tulane | 0 | – | 4 | – | 0 | 3 | – | 5 | – | 0 |
$ – Conference champion

The 1913 Mississippi A&M Aggies football team represented The Agricultural and Mechanical College of the State of Mississippi (now known as Mississippi State University) as a member of the Southern Intercollegiate Athletic Association (SIAA) during the 1913 college football season. Led by fifth-year head coach W. D. Chadwick, the Aggies compiled an overall record of 6–1–1, with a mark of 5–1–1 in conference play. Mississippi A&M played home games at the Hardy Field in Starkville, Mississippi.

== Schedule ==
| Date | Opponent | Site | Result | Source |
|---|---|---|---|---|
| October 4 | Howard (AL)* | Hardy Field; Starkville, MS | W 66–0 | |
| October 10 | Mississippi College | Hardy Field; Starkville, MS | W 14–13 | |
| October 17 | Central University | Columbus Fair Grounds; Columbus, MS | W 31–0 | |
| October 25 | at Auburn | Rickwood Field; Birmingham, AL | L 0–34 | |
| November 1 | at Texas A&M | State Fairgrounds; Dallas, TX | W 6–0 | |
| November 8 | Tulane | Hardy Field; Starkville, MS | W 32–0 | |
| November 15 | LSU | Hardy Field; Starkville, MS (rivalry) | T 0–0 | |
| November 27 | at Alabama | Rickwood Field; Birmingham, AL (rivalry) | W 7–0 | |
*Non-conference game
