= 1913 Clemson Tigers football team =

American college football season

1913 Clemson Tigers football
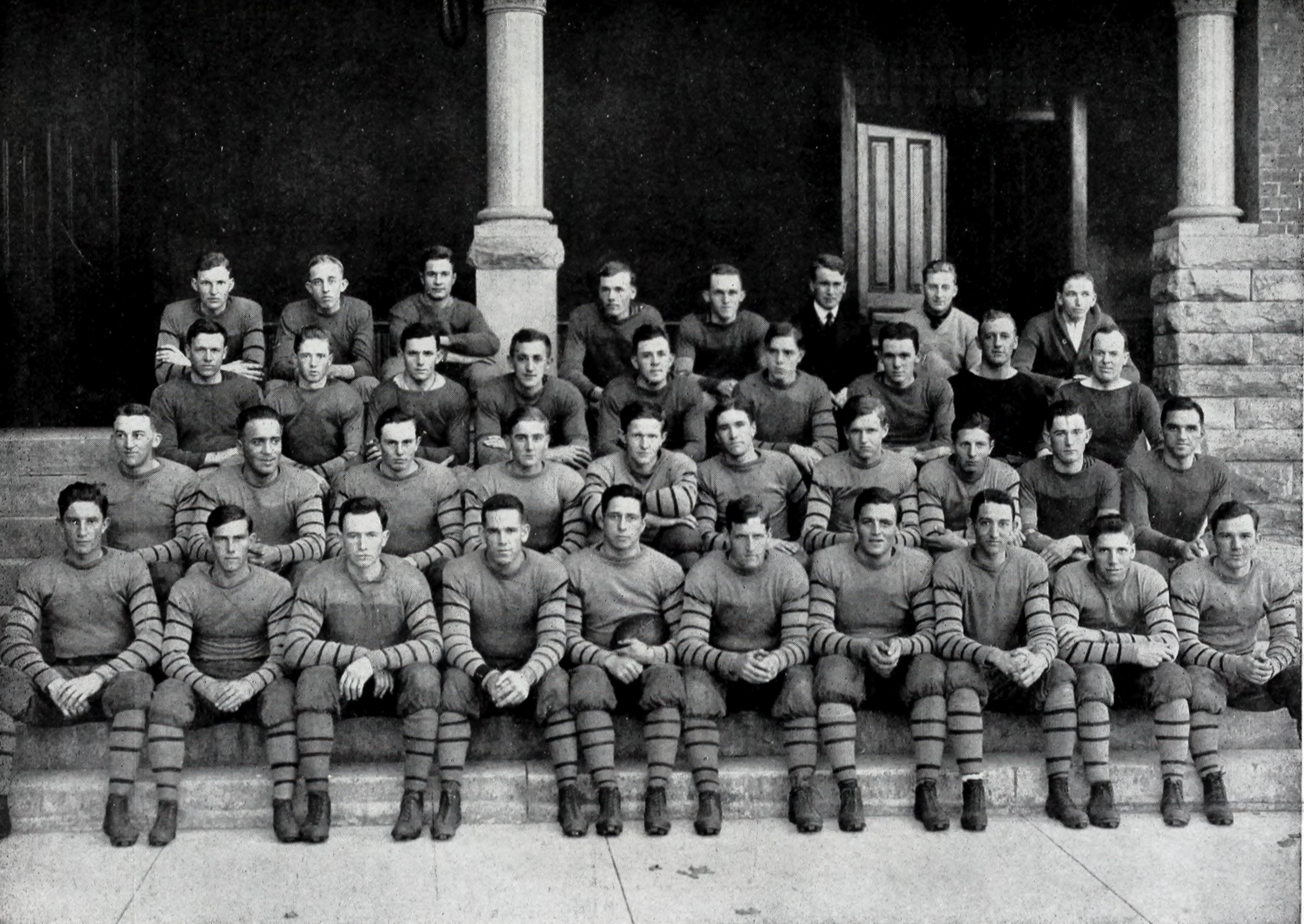

State champion
- Conference: Southern Intercollegiate Athletic Association
- Record: 4–4 (2–4 SIAA)
- Head coach: Bob Williams (3rd season)
- Captain: A. P. Gandy
- Home stadium: Bowman Field

1913 Southern Intercollegiate Athletic Association football standings
	Conf.					Overall
Team	W		L		T	W		L		T
Auburn $	8	–	0	–	0	8	–	0	–	0
Mississippi A&M	5	–	1	–	1	6	–	1	–	1
Georgia	3	–	1	–	0	6	–	2	–	0
Vanderbilt	3	–	1	–	0	5	–	3	–	0
Georgia Tech	5	–	2	–	0	7	–	2	–	0
Alabama	4	–	3	–	0	6	–	3	–	0
LSU	1	–	1	–	2	6	–	1	–	2
Sewanee	2	–	2	–	0	4	–	3	–	0
Florida	2	–	2	–	0	4	–	3	–	0
Clemson	2	–	4	–	0	4	–	4	–	0
Mississippi College	1	–	2	–	0	6	–	3	–	0
Tennessee	1	–	3	–	0	6	–	3	–	0
The Citadel	0	–	3	–	1	3	–	4	–	2
Mercer	0	–	4	–	1	2	–	5	–	1
Kentucky	0	–	1	–	0	6	–	2	–	0
Texas A&M	0	–	1	–	1	3	–	4	–	2
Central University	0	–	2	–	0	2	–	5	–	0
Tulane	0	–	4	–	0	3	–	5	–	0
$ – Conference champion

The 1913 Clemson Tigers football team represented Clemson Agricultural College—now known as Clemson University—during the 1913 Southern Intercollegiate Athletic Association football season. Led by Bob Williams, who returned for his third season as head coach after having helmed the team in 1906 and 1909, the Tigers compiled an overall record of 4–4 with a mark of 2–4 in SIAA play. A. P. Gandy was the team captain.

== Schedule ==
Date	Opponent	Site	Result	Source
October 4	Davidson*	Bowman Field; Calhoun, SC	W 6–3	
October 11	at Alabama	The Quad; Tuscaloosa, AL (rivalry)	L 0–20	
October 18	Auburn	Bowman Field; Calhoun, SC (rivalry)	L 0–20	
October 30	at South Carolina*	State Fairgrounds; Columbia, SC (rivalry)	W 32–0	
November 6	vs. Georgia	Augusta, GA (rivalry)	L 15–18	
November 8	at The Citadel	College Park Stadium; Charleston, SC	W 7–3	
November 17	at Mercer	Central City Park; Macon, GA	W 52–0	
November 27	at Georgia Tech	Grant Field; Atlanta, GA (rivalry)	L 0–34	
*Non-conference game

== Bibliography ==
- Bourret, Tim. "2010 Clemson Football Media Guide" (PDF). Clemson University. p. 202. Archived from the original (PDF) on November 12, 2012.
