= 1913 LSU Tigers football team =

American college football season

1913 LSU Tigers football
- Conference: Southern Intercollegiate Athletic Association
- Record: 6–1–2 (1–1–2 SIAA)
- Head coach: Pat Dwyer (3rd season)
- Captain: Tom Dutton
- Home stadium: State Field

1913 Southern Intercollegiate Athletic Association football standings
	Conf.					Overall
Team	W		L		T	W		L		T
Auburn $	8	–	0	–	0	8	–	0	–	0
Mississippi A&M	5	–	1	–	1	6	–	1	–	1
Georgia	3	–	1	–	0	6	–	2	–	0
Vanderbilt	3	–	1	–	0	5	–	3	–	0
Georgia Tech	5	–	2	–	0	7	–	2	–	0
Alabama	4	–	3	–	0	6	–	3	–	0
LSU	1	–	1	–	2	6	–	1	–	2
Sewanee	2	–	2	–	0	4	–	3	–	0
Florida	2	–	2	–	0	4	–	3	–	0
Clemson	2	–	4	–	0	4	–	4	–	0
Mississippi College	1	–	2	–	0	6	–	3	–	0
Tennessee	1	–	3	–	0	6	–	3	–	0
The Citadel	0	–	3	–	1	3	–	4	–	2
Mercer	0	–	4	–	1	2	–	5	–	1
Kentucky	0	–	1	–	0	6	–	2	–	0
Texas A&M	0	–	1	–	1	3	–	4	–	2
Central University	0	–	2	–	0	2	–	5	–	0
Tulane	0	–	4	–	0	3	–	5	–	0
$ – Conference champion

The 1913 LSU Tigers football team represented the LSU Tigers of Louisiana State University during the 1913 Southern Intercollegiate Athletic Association football season. The team was captained by center Tom Dutton. At guards were T. R. Mobley and Arthur Klock. In the backfield was quarterback Lawrence Dupont and fullback Alf Reid. Dupont had 15 touchdowns in 1913, four of them coming on November 22 in a game against rival Tulane in a 40–0 victory.

Coach Pat Dwyer used Dutton for a "kangaroo play" in which Dupont would crawl between Dutton's legs; supposedly very effective in short yardage situations.

== Schedule ==
Date	Time	Opponent	Site	Result	Source
October 4		at Louisiana Industrial*	Tech Athletic Field; Ruston, LA	W 20–2	
October 11		at Southwestern Louisiana Industrial*	Campus Athletic Field; Lafayette, LA	W 26–0	
October 18		Jefferson (LA)*	State Field; Baton Rouge, LA	W 46–6	
October 22		Baylor*	State Field; Baton Rouge, LA	W 50–0	
November 1	2:30 p.m.	vs. Auburn	Monroe Park; Mobile, AL (rivalry)	L 0–7	
November 8		vs. Arkansas*	State Fair Grounds; Shreveport, LA (rivalry)	W 12–7	
November 15		at Mississippi A&M	Hardy Field; Starkville, MS (rivalry)	T 0–0	
November 22		Tulane	State Field; Baton Rouge, LA (rivalry)	W 40–0	
November 27		vs. Texas A&M	West End Park; Houston, TX (rivalry)	T 7–7	
*Non-conference game; All times are in Central time
