= A. C. Hoffman =

American football coach (1884–1920)

Biographical details
- Born: 1884
- Died: January 31, 1920; Chicago, Illinois, U.S.

Playing career

Football
- 1908–1909: Chicago

Basketball
- 1907–1910: Chicago

Coaching career (HC unless noted)

Football
- 1911: Ripon
- 1913: Tulane

Administrative career (AD unless noted)
- 1911–1912: Ripon

Head coaching record
- Overall: 6–9

Arthur Charles Hoffman (1884 – January 31, 1920) was an American college football coach. He served as the head football coach at Tulane University for one season in 1913, compiling a record of 3–5.

Hoffman was a 1910 graduate of the University of Chicago where he starred on five conference championship teams in basketball and football. He was a member of 1907–08 basketball team that won the Helms Foundation national championship.

Hoffman was the head football coach and athletic director at Ripon College in Ripon, Wisconsin for one year.

== Head coaching record ==
Year	Team	Overall	Conference	Standing	Bowl/playoffs
Ripon Crimson (Independent) (1911)
1911	Ripon	3–4			
Ripon:		3–4			
Tulane Olive and Blue (Southern Intercollegiate Athletic Association) (1913)
1913	Tulane	3–5	0–4	17th	
Tulane:		3–5	0–4		
Total:		6–9			
