= 1913 Sewanee Tigers football team =

American college football season

1913 Sewanee Tigers football
- Conference: Southern Intercollegiate Athletic Association
- Record: 4–3 (2–2 SIAA)
- Head coach: Harris G. Cope (5th season)
- Captain: R. N. MacCallum
- Home stadium: Hardee Field

Uniform
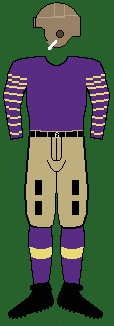

1913 Southern Intercollegiate Athletic Association football standings
	Conf.					Overall
Team	W		L		T	W		L		T
Auburn $	8	–	0	–	0	8	–	0	–	0
Mississippi A&M	5	–	1	–	1	6	–	1	–	1
Georgia	3	–	1	–	0	6	–	2	–	0
Vanderbilt	3	–	1	–	0	5	–	3	–	0
Georgia Tech	5	–	2	–	0	7	–	2	–	0
Alabama	4	–	3	–	0	6	–	3	–	0
LSU	1	–	1	–	2	6	–	1	–	2
Sewanee	2	–	2	–	0	4	–	3	–	0
Florida	2	–	2	–	0	4	–	3	–	0
Clemson	2	–	4	–	0	4	–	4	–	0
Mississippi College	1	–	2	–	0	6	–	3	–	0
Tennessee	1	–	3	–	0	6	–	3	–	0
The Citadel	0	–	3	–	1	3	–	4	–	2
Mercer	0	–	4	–	1	2	–	5	–	1
Kentucky	0	–	1	–	0	6	–	2	–	0
Texas A&M	0	–	1	–	1	3	–	4	–	2
Central University	0	–	2	–	0	2	–	5	–	0
Tulane	0	–	4	–	0	3	–	5	–	0
$ – Conference champion

The 1913 Sewanee Tigers football team represented Sewanee: The University of the South during the 1913 college football season as a member of the Southern Intercollegiate Athletic Association (SIAA). The Tigers were led by head coach Harris G. Cope in his fifth season and finished with a record of four wins and three losses (4–3 overall, 2–2 in the SIAA).

== Schedule ==
Date	Opponent	Site	Result	Source
October 4	Chattanooga*	Hardee Field; Sewanee, TN	W 28–0	
October 11	Marion County High School*	Hardee Field; Sewanee, TN	W 88–0	
October 18	vs. Tennessee	Andrews Field; Chattanooga, TN	W 17–6	
October 25	at Texas*	State Fair Stadium; Dallas, TX	L 7–13	
November 1	at Georgia Tech	Grant Stadium; Atlanta, GA	L 0–33	
November 9	at Alabama	Rickwood Field; Birmingham, AL	W 10–7	
November 27	at Vanderbilt	Dudley Field; Nashville, Tennessee (rivalry)	L 13–63	
*Non-conference game
