= SS John Stagg =

World War II Liberty ship of the United States

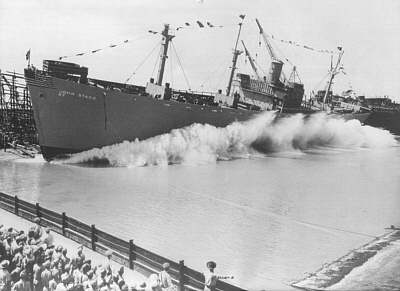
- The side-launch of SS John Stagg, 7 July 1943

History

United States
- Name: John Stagg (1943-50); Takoil (1950-54); National Servant (1954-61); Yianna (1961-68)
- Namesake: John Stagg
- Owner: United States War Shipping Administration, New Orleans (1943-48); Philadelphia Marine Corporation, Dover, DE (1948-50); Panoil Transport Corporation, New York (1950-51); National Shipping & Trading Corporation, New York (1951-54); Takivapor Compagnia Navigazione, Liberia (1954-61); Hellenic Shipping & Industries Co, Greece (1961-68)
- Operator: owner operated except:- Bernuth-Lembcke Company, New York (1943-48)
- Port of registry: (United States) New Orleans (1943-54); Liberia (1954-61); Greece (1961-63); Liberia (1963-68)
- Builder: Delta Steamship Company, New Orleans
- Yard number: 1737
- Laid down: 18 May 1943
- Launched: 7 July 1943
- Completed: 4 September 1943
- Identification: US Official Number 243900 (1943-54); Code letters KXKJ (1943- )
- Fate: Scrapped 1968

General characteristics
- Class & type: Z-ET1-S-C3 Liberty ship
- Tonnage: 6,129 GRT (1943-55); 7,267 GRT (1955-56); 8,513 GRT (1956-68)
- Length: 422 ft 8 in (128.83 m) (1943-55); 492 ft 9 in (150.19 m) (1955-68)
- Beam: 57 ft (17.37 m)
- Draft: 30 ft (9.14 m)
- Propulsion: 1 x triple expansion steam engine (American Shipbuilding Co, Cleveland, Ohio)
- Speed: 11 knots (20 km/h)

SS John Stagg was a tanker-type (Z-ET1-S-C3) Liberty ship built at the Delta Shipbuilding Company, New Orleans, Louisiana, during World War II. She was named after John Stagg (1864–1915), who was President of Alabama Presbyterian College for Men.

== War Record ==
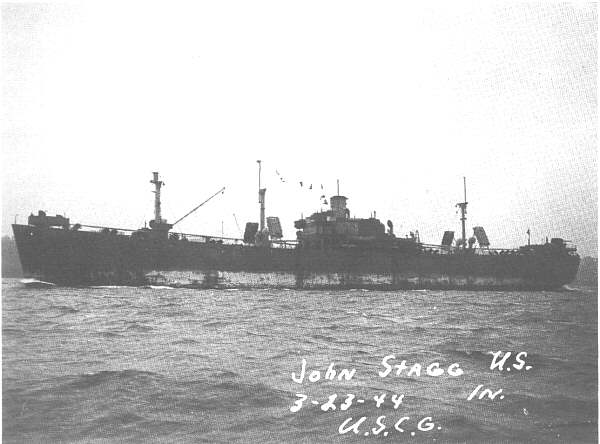
The SS John Stagg at sea - 1944

John Stagg was laid down on 18 May 1943, and launched on 7 July. She was delivered on 4 September to the United States War Shipping Administration under the management of Bernuth-Lembcke Company, New York City. Although John Stagg was a tanker, she was disguised to look like a cargo ship, with her deck piping concealed and dummy cargo handling gear fitted. She carried heavy deck cargo or aircraft in addition to oil. John Stagg was a member of a number of convoys during World War II.

HX 285

John Stagg was a member of Convoy HX 285, which sailed from New York on 28 March 1944 and arrived at Liverpool on 12 April. She was bound for Milford Haven.

UGS 45

John Stagg was a member of Convoy UGS 45, which departed Hampton Roads on 12 June 1944, and arrived at Port Said on 7 July. She joined the convoy at Augusta.

== Postwar ==
John Stagg entered the reserve fleet on 22 July 1946. She was moored in the James River. On 5 February 1948, John Stagg was sold to the Philadelphia Marine Corp, Dover, Del. In 1950, she was sold to the Panoil Transport Corporation, New York and renamed Takoil. The following year she was sold to the National Shipping & Trading Corporation, New York. In 1954, Takoil was renamed National Servant and reflagged to Liberia. In 1955, she was sold to the Takivapor Compagnia Navigazione, Liberia and rebuilt as a dry cargo ship. Her Gross Register Tonnage was increased to 7,267. She was again rebuilt in 1956 and her Gross Register Tonnage increased to 8,513. Her length was increased to 492 feet 9 inches (150.19 m). In 1961, National Servant was sold to Hellenic Shipping & Industries Co, and reflagged to Greece. She reverted to the Liberian flag in 1963 and served until 1968, when she was scrapped in Hirao, where she arrived for scrapping on 17 October 1968.

== Official number and code letters ==
Official numbers were a forerunner to IMO Numbers.

John Stagg had the US Official Number 243900 and used the code letters KXKJ.
