= Red Rainey =

American football player

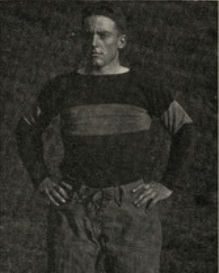
- Rainey c. 1913

No. 7
- Position: Halfback/Quarterback

Career information
- College: Tennessee (1913–1914)

Awards and highlights
- SIAA championship (1914); All-Southern (1913)

Horace "Red" Rainey was a college football player.

== University of Tennessee ==
Rainey was a prominent running back for the Tennessee Volunteers of the University of Tennessee.

=== 1913 ===
On the 6–7 loss to Vanderbilt in 1913, "'Red' Rainey shone for Tennessee, though he was later relegated to the side lines after a collision with one A. Sikes, Esq., otherwise known as the "Roaring Representative from Williamson." Rainey was selected All-Southern.

=== 1914 ===
A description of the 14–7 victory of Sewanee in 1914 reads, "'Red Rainey' got back into the game just at the start of the third quarter, after a month's absence from scrimmage. In spite of his bum ankle, "Red" did some good work and finished the game without calling time out. Once he intercepted a forward pass and made a good return."
