= Harvey Hester =

American football player and coach

- Hester in 1946

Playing career
- 1911–1913: Florida
- Positions: Quarterback, halfback

Coaching career (HC unless noted)
- 1915: Wofford

Head coaching record
- Overall: 3–5

Harry S. "Harvey" Hester was an American football player, coach, and sports executive. He served as the head football coach at Wofford College in 1915. Hester was a standout player at the University of Florida, once scoring seven touchdowns in one game against Florida Southern College in 1913.

Hester joined with Lt. Commander Jack Meagher in 1945 to obtain a franchise for Miami in the forthcoming All-America Football Conference (AAFC). Meagher, the coach of the Iowa Pre-Flight Seahawks football team in 1944, brought with him the "Seahawks" moniker for the new football club.

The Miami Seahawks played only one year, the 1946 season, before folding due to financial difficulties. The club's assets were sold to a new ownership group based in Baltimore, Maryland, and the club was moved there for the 1947 season to become the Baltimore Colts.

== Head coaching record ==
Year	Team	Overall	Conference	Standing	Bowl/playoffs
Wofford Terriers (Southern Intercollegiate Athletic Association) (1915)
1915	Wofford	3–5	0–3	T–21st	
Wofford:		3–5	0–3		
Total:		3–5			
