= Hord Boensch =

American football player (1893–1924)

Profile
- Position: Quarterback

Personal information
- Born: March 13, 1893; Nashville, Tennessee, U.S.
- Died: December 19, 1924 (aged 31); Cleveland, Ohio, U.S.

Career information
- High school: Bowen School
- College: Vanderbilt (1913)

Benjamin Hord Boensch (March 13, 1893 – December 19, 1924) was a college football player. He was the quarterback for the Vanderbilt Commodores football team in 1913. Some writers selected him All-Southern that season. Boensch kicked the extra point to beat Tennessee 7 to 6. He named for his grandfather Ben M. Hord, a major for the Confederacy in North Carolina.

== See also ==
- 1913 College Football All-Southern Team
