= Mississippi State Fair =

Annual event in Jackson, Mississippi

Coordinates: 32.301162°N 90.173627°W

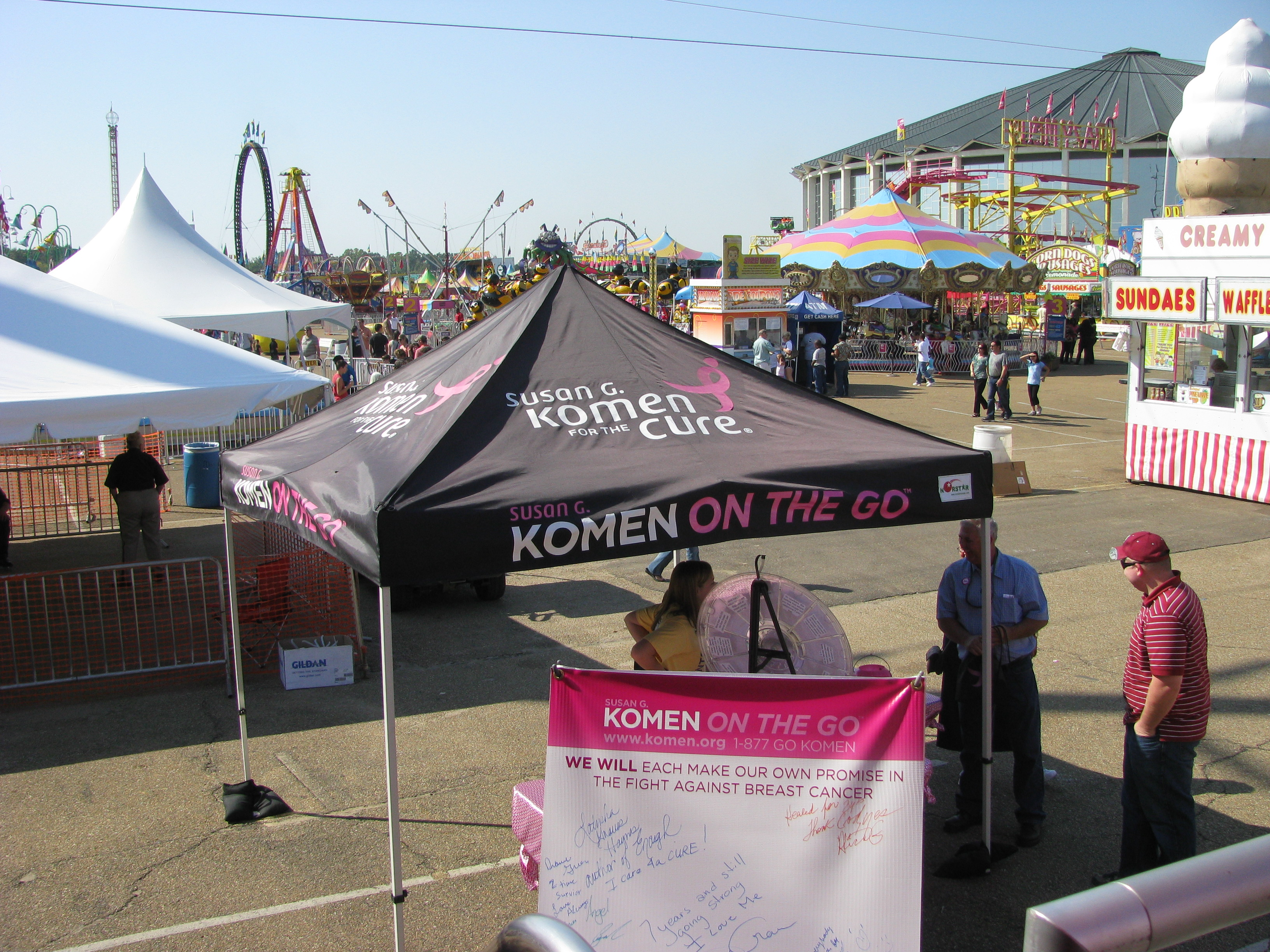
- Mississippi State Fair, October 2014
- Genre: State fair
- Location: Jackson, Mississippi
- Website: MDAC

The Mississippi State Fair is the state fair of the U.S. state of Mississippi each October.

== History ==
The fair was founded in 1858. The fair went on hiatus in 1917–18 & 1942–44, when the United States was engaged in World War I and World War II, respectively. In addition, crowd events were reduced in 1917-1918 because of the Spanish flu pandemic, which is estimated to have killed millions of people worldwide.

In the 1950s, Medgar Evers, an African-American civil rights activist, led efforts to racially integrate the event.

In 2020, during the first year of the COVID-19 pandemic, the fair operated under strict measures to try to protect public health. Attendees were asked to wear masks and to practice social distancing to lessen transmission of the serious respiratory disease. It caused more than a million deaths in the United States over the next few years.

== Fairgrounds ==
The fairgrounds cover over a hundred acres in downtown Jackson. The Mississippi Coliseum is part of the complex. Mississippi's fair grounds is one of the widest.
