= Enoch Brown (American football) =

American football player (1892–1962)

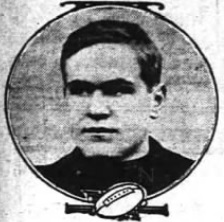
- Brown c. 1912

Vanderbilt Commodores
- Position: End

Personal information
- Born: May 19, 1892; Franklin, Tennessee
- Died: 1962 (aged 69–70)
- Listed height: 5 ft 8 in (1.73 m)
- Listed weight: 160 lb (73 kg)

Career information
- High school: Battle Ground Academy
- College: Vanderbilt (1911–1913)

Awards and highlights
- SIAA championship (1911, 1912); All-Southern (1912, 1913); 1912 All-time Vandy 2nd team.

Enoch "Nuck" Brown, Jr. (May 19, 1892 – 1962) was an All-Southern college football end for the Vanderbilt Commodores of Vanderbilt University.

== Early life ==
Enoch Brown, Jr. was born on May 19, 1892, in Franklin, Tennessee, to Enoch Brown, Sr. and Lucinda Allen. His older brother Innis Brown was captain of the 1905 Vanderbilt Commodores football team and a long time official. Enoch, Jr. attended preparatory school at Battle Ground Academy.

== Vanderbilt ==
Brown also was a catcher on the Vanderbilt baseball team and a member of the basketball team. Nuck was captain of the 1913 Vanderbilt Commodores football team. He was also a Rhodes Scholar. At Vanderbilt he was a member of Delta Tau Delta.

Brown won the Bachelor of Ugliness for the class of 1914.

== Coaching career ==
=== High school ===
Nuck Brown later coached at Montgomery Bell Academy.

=== Vanderbilt ===
Brown assisted his alma mater in 1920.
