= Alabama Presbyterian College =

Defunct college in Anniston, Alabama

Coordinates: 33°39′13″N 85°39′20″W

Alabama Presbyterian College was a college in Anniston, Alabama affiliated with the Presbyterian Church. It was founded in 1905, opened in 1906 and continued until 1918 when it became a preparatory school. It was renamed Anniston University School in 1922 and closed in 1923. The school was taken over by Alabama Military Institute.

The college site was on an 11-acre parcel of land at Eighth Street and Leighton Avenue. The college became coeducational in 1917.

The college had a football team (List of defunct college football teams) and baseball team.

The SS John Stagg was a tanker-type Liberty ship named after John Stagg (1864–1915), who was president of Alabama Presbyterian College for Men.

== Alumni ==
- Lamar Jeffers, U.S. Representative
- Oliver Carmichael, chancellor of Vanderbilt University from 1937 to 1946 and president of the University of Alabama from 1953 to 1957
- David Barr, U.S. Army general officer

== See also ==
- List of colleges and universities in Alabama: Difference between revisions
