= 1913 Fordham Maroon football team =

American college football season

1913 Fordham Maroon football
- Conference: Independent
- Record: 18–9–2 / 3–3–2
- Head coach: Tom Thorp (2nd season)
- Captain: Frank Mulvey
- Home stadium: Fordham Field

1913 Eastern college football independents records
	Conf.			Overall
Team	W	L	T	W		L		T
Harvard		–		9	–	0	–	0
Carlisle		–		10	–	1	–	1
Washington & Jefferson		–		10	–	0	–	1
Army		–		8	–	1	–	0
Dartmouth		–		7	–	1	–	0
Tufts		–		7	–	1	–	0
Colgate		–		6	–	1	–	1
Franklin & Marshall		–		6	–	2	–	0
Pittsburgh		–		6	–	2	–	1
Princeton		–		5	–	2	–	1
Yale		–		5	–	2	–	3
Rutgers		–		6	–	3	–	0
Penn		–		6	–	3	–	1
Villanova		–		4	–	2	–	1
Lehigh		–		5	–	3	–	0
Bucknell		–		6	–	4	–	0
Cornell		–		5	–	4	–	1
Boston College		–		4	–	3	–	1
Syracuse		–		6	–	4	–	0
Fordham		–		3	–	3	–	2
Geneva		–		4	–	4	–	0
Lafayette		–		4	–	5	–	1
Brown		–		4	–	5	–	0
Duquesne		–		3	–	5	–	1
Carnegie Tech		–		2	–	4	–	1
Holy Cross		–		3	–	6	–	0
New Hampshire		–		2	–	4	–	0
Temple		–		1	–	3	–	2
Penn State		–		2	–	6	–	0
Rhode Island State		–		2	–	6	–	0
Vermont		–		1	–	5	–	0
NYU		–		0	–	8	–	0

The 1913 Fordham Maroon football team was an American football team that represented Fordham University as an independent during the 1913 college football season. In its second and final year under head coach Tom Thorp, Fordham claims an 18–9–2 record. College Football Data Warehouse (CFDW) lists the team's record at 3–3–2.

== Schedule ==
The following eight games are reported in Fordham's media guide, CFDW, and contemporaneous press coverage.

Date	Opponent	Site	Result	Source
September 27	Saint Peter's	Fordham Field; Bronx, NY	W 34–0	
October 4	at Princeton	University Field; Princeton, NJ	L 0–69	
October 11	RPI	Fordham Field; Bronx, NY	W 7–0	
October 18	Seton Hall	Fordham Field; Bronx, NY	W 21–0	
November 4	Villanova	Fordham Field; Bronx, NY	L 0–43	
November 8	Boston College	Fordham Field; Bronx, NY	T 27–27	
November 15	at Holy Cross	Fitton Field; Worcester, MA	L 0–60	
November 27	Mount St. Mary's	Fordham Field; Bronx, NY	T 0–0	

The following are additional games reported in the Fordham media guide.

Date	Opponent	Site	Result
	Murray Hill Athletic Club		L 6–14
	USS Wyoming		L 0–21
	USS Arkansas		L 0–17
	NYU		W
	Bedford Athletic Club		L 0–17
	St. Joseph's		W
	USS Hancock		W 24–0
	Fort Wadsworth		W 28–7
	Fort Totten		W 16–3
	Vermont		W
	St. Peter's		W 47–21
	Pratt		W 38–16
	Muhlenberg		W
	Catholic		W
	7th Regiment		W
	Seton Hall		W
	Concordia		W 7–0
	St Peter's		W 29–7
	Rhode Island State		W
