= 1913 Maine Elephants football team =

American college football season

1913 Maine Elephants football

MIAA champion
- Conference: Maine Intercollegiate Athletic Association
- Record: 5–2–1 (3–0 MIAA)
- Head coach: Thomas J. Riley (2nd season)
- Captain: Allan Sawyer
- Home stadium: Alumni Field

The 1913 Maine Elephants football team was an American football team that represented the University of Maine during the 1913 college football season. The team compiled a 5–2–1 record. Thomas J. Riley was the coach, and Allan Sawyer was the team captain.

== Schedule ==
Date	Time	Opponent	Site	Result	Attendance	Source
September 20		Boston College*	Alumni Field; Orono, ME	W 6–0		
September 27	3:00 p.m.	at Harvard*	Harvard Stadium; Boston, MA	L 0–34	8,000–10,000	
October 4		at Yale*	Yale Field; New Haven, CT	T 0–0		
October 11		Rhode Island State*	Alumni Field; Orono, ME	W 44–0		
October 18		at Tufts*	Medford, MA	L 6–19		
October 25		Bates	Orono, ME	W 34–0		
November 1		Colby	Orono, ME	W 3–0		
November 8		at Bowdoin	Whittier Field; Brunswick, ME	W 9–0		
*Non-conference game; All times are in Eastern time
