= 1913 Massachusetts Aggies football team =

American college football season

1913 Massachusetts Aggies football
- Conference: Athletic League of New England State Colleges
- Record: 4–3 ( Athletic League of New England State Colleges)
- Head coach: Arthur Brides (2nd season)
- Home stadium: Alumni Field

The 1913 Massachusetts Aggies football team represented Massachusetts Agricultural College in the 1913 college football season. The team was coached by Arthur Brides and played its home games at Alumni Field in Amherst, Massachusetts. Massachusetts finished the season with a record of 4–3.

== Schedule ==
Date	Opponent	Site	Result	Attendance	Source
September 27	at Dartmouth	Alumni Oval; Hanover, NH	L 3–13		
October 4	at Holy Cross	Fitton Field; Worcester, MA	W 6–0		
October 11	at Union (NY)	Schenectady, NY	W 20–0		
October 25	Middlebury	Alumni Field; Amherst, MA	W 33–0		
November 1	at Tufts	Tufts Oval; Somerville, MA	L 0–14		
November 8	at New Hampshire	Textile Field; Manchester, NH (rivalry)	W 34–0	1,200	
November 15	at Springfield YMCA	Pratt Field; Springfield, MA	L 0–14		
