= Harry von Kersburg =

American football player and coach (1884–1951)

Harry Von Kersburg
Biographical details
- Born: October 14, 1884; Medina, New York, U.S.
- Died: July 23, 1951 (aged 66); New York, New York, U.S.

Playing career
- 1903: Lehigh
- 1904–1906: Harvard
- Position: Guard

Coaching career (HC unless noted)
- 1908–1909: Harvard (assistant)
- 1911: Harvard (assistant)
- 1913: Holy Cross

Head coaching record
- Overall: 3–6

Accomplishments and honors

Awards
- Third-team All-American (1906)

Harry Edwin von Kersburg (October 14, 1884 – July 23, 1951) was an American college football player, coach, and official who was an All-American guard for the Harvard Crimson. During his athletic career, he went by the name Harry Kersburg.

== Football ==
von Kersburg was born on October 14, 1884, in Medina, New York to James Nelson and Rosemond (von Zalinski) Von Kersburg. After graduating from Medina High School, von Kersburg enrolled at Lehigh University with the intention of eventually transferring to Harvard College. He played for Lehigh in 1903 and at Harvard from 1904 to 1906. In 1906, he injured his leg in the penultimate game against Dartmouth, but recovered enough to play in the season finale against Yale. The injury would require surgery the following February.

== Track and field ==
While at Harvard, von Kersburg was introduced to the hammer throw. He finished in second place at the 1906 USA Outdoor Track and Field Championships at Travers Island. In 1908, he won 16-pound hammer throw at the same competition.

== Coaching ==
von Kersburg was an assistant football coach at Harvard in 1908, 1909, and 1911. He served as the head football coach at the College of the Holy Cross in Worcester, Massachusetts in 1913, compiling a record of 3–6. From 1931 to 1937, von Kersburg was an unpaid athletic advisor and football coach at Sing Sing. One of Sing Sing's football players, Alabama Pitts, went on to play in the National Football League after his release.

== Business ==
In 1910, von Kersburg worked as a mining engineer in Alaska. In 1914, he became the employment manager of the Hotel McAlpin in New York City. He then held the same position at R. H. Macy & Co. until 1928. While with the department store, von Kersburg invented the Macy-Spalding athletic timer. He later worked on Wall Street with DuBosque, George & Co. and later with Georgeson & Company.

== Personal life ==
On August 15, 1917, von Kersburg married Frances R. Ceratt. They had two children, John and Mary.

== Officiating ==
After leaving coaching, von Kersburg remained involved in football as an official. He retired in 1939, but served as a supervisor of officials for the Eastern College Athletic Conference until his death on July 23, 1951, in New York City.

== Head coaching record ==
Year	Team	Overall	Conference	Standing	Bowl/playoffs
Holy Cross (Independent) (1913)
1913	Holy Cross	3–6			
Holy Cross:		3–6			
Total:		3–6			
