= 1913 Yale Bulldogs football team =

American college football season

1913 Yale Bulldogs football
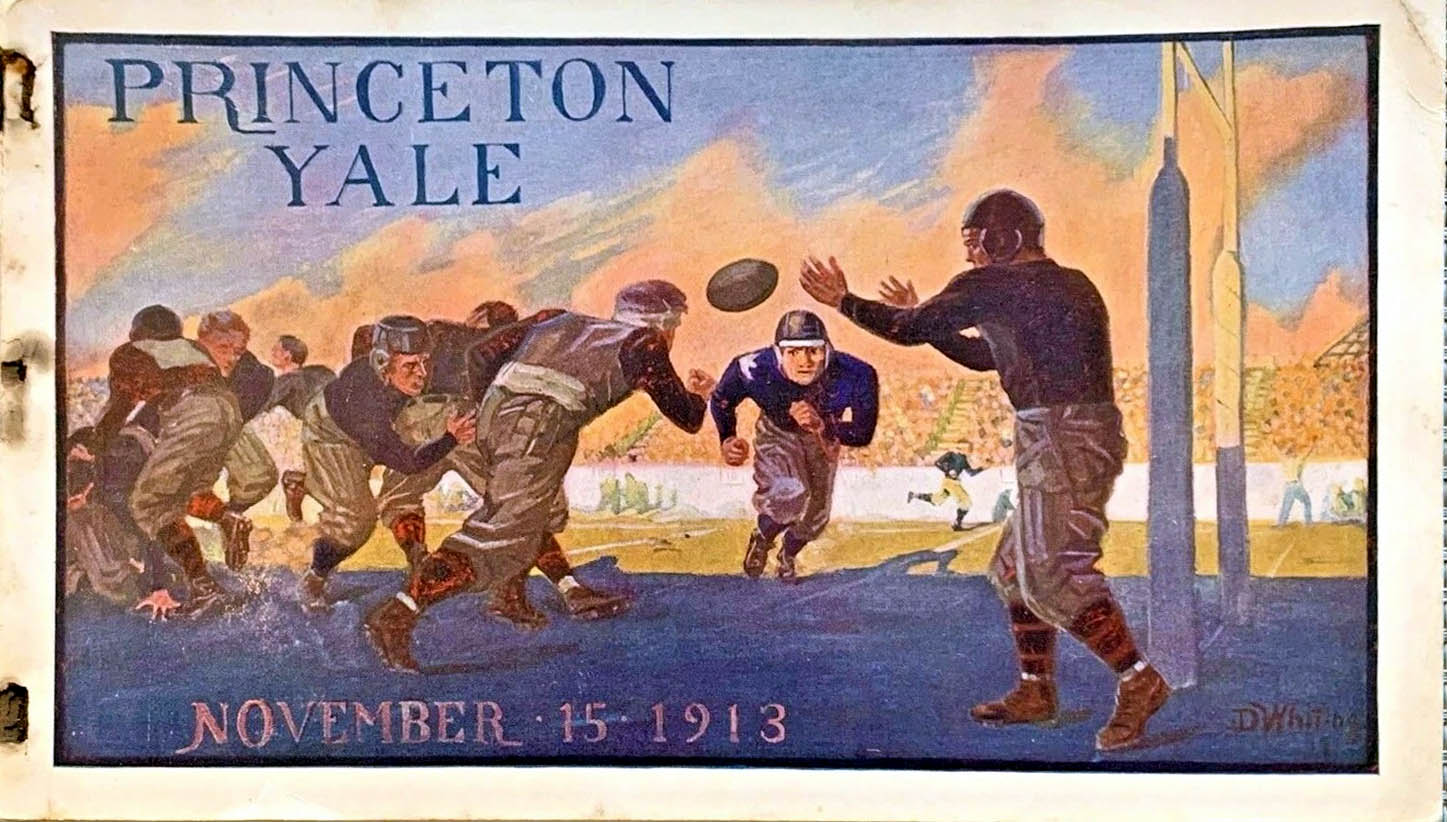
- Yale v Princeton program
- Conference: Independent
- Record: 5–2–3
- Head coach: Howard Jones (2nd season)
- Captain: Hank Ketcham
- Home stadium: Yale Field

1913 Eastern college football independents records
	Conf.			Overall
Team	W	L	T	W		L		T
Harvard		–		9	–	0	–	0
Carlisle		–		10	–	1	–	1
Washington & Jefferson		–		10	–	0	–	1
Army		–		8	–	1	–	0
Dartmouth		–		7	–	1	–	0
Tufts		–		7	–	1	–	0
Colgate		–		6	–	1	–	1
Franklin & Marshall		–		6	–	2	–	0
Pittsburgh		–		6	–	2	–	1
Princeton		–		5	–	2	–	1
Yale		–		5	–	2	–	3
Rutgers		–		6	–	3	–	0
Penn		–		6	–	3	–	1
Villanova		–		4	–	2	–	1
Lehigh		–		5	–	3	–	0
Bucknell		–		6	–	4	–	0
Cornell		–		5	–	4	–	1
Boston College		–		4	–	3	–	1
Syracuse		–		6	–	4	–	0
Fordham		–		3	–	3	–	2
Geneva		–		4	–	4	–	0
Lafayette		–		4	–	5	–	1
Brown		–		4	–	5	–	0
Duquesne		–		3	–	5	–	1
Carnegie Tech		–		2	–	4	–	1
Holy Cross		–		3	–	6	–	0
New Hampshire		–		2	–	4	–	0
Temple		–		1	–	3	–	2
Penn State		–		2	–	6	–	0
Rhode Island State		–		2	–	6	–	0
Vermont		–		1	–	5	–	0
NYU		–		0	–	8	–	0

The 1913 Yale Bulldogs football team represented Yale University in the 1913 college football season. The Bulldogs finished with a 5–2–3 record.

Howard Jones, who had previously coached Yale to a national championship in 1909, was hired in February 1913 to return as Yale's head coach.

Yale tackle Bud Talbott was a consensus pick for the 1913 College Football All-America Team, and four other Yale players (end Benjamin F. Avery and linemen Hank Ketcham, John S. Pendleton and William Marting) received first-team All-America honors from at least one selector.

== Schedule ==
Date	Opponent	Site	Result	Attendance	Source
September 24	Wesleyan	Yale Field; New Haven, CT	W 21–0		
September 27	Holy Cross	Yale Field; New Haven, CT	W 10–0		
October 4	Maine	Yale Field; New Haven, CT	T 0–0		
October 11	Lafayette	Yale Field; New Haven, CT	W 27–0		
October 18	Lehigh	Yale Field; New Haven, CT	W 37–0		
October 25	Washington & Jefferson	Yale Field; New Haven, CT	T 0–0		
November 1	Colgate	Yale Field; New Haven, CT	L 6–16		
November 8	Brown	Yale Field; New Haven, CT	W 17–0		
November 15	Princeton	Yale Field; New Haven, CT (rivalry)	T 3–3		
November 22	at Harvard	Harvard Stadium; Boston, MA (rivalry)	L 5–15	50,000	

== Roster ==
- Forester F. Ainsworth, HB
- Lynn J. Arnold
- Benjamin F. Avery, E
- Maurice R. Brann
- Caldwell, C
- Lyon Carter, E
- Castles, HB
- Russell S. Cooney, G
- Thomas H. Cornell, HB
- Cornish, QB
- Dietz, FB
- David L. Dunn, FB
- Gile, E
- Otis Guernsey, FB
- Hammer, QB
- Edward W. Hubbard, E
- Hank Ketcham, C
- Carroll W. Knowles, HB
- Loughbridge, T
- Archibald MacLeish
- Madden, G
- Malcolm, HB
- Donald Markle, HB
- Henry A. Marting, G
- Frederick W. Oakes, T
- John S. Pendleton, G
- Charles H. Roberts, E
- Bud Talbott, T
- Taylor, FB
- Thompson, HB
- William C. Warren, T
- Nelson M. Way, G
- Nathaniel Wheeler, HB
- Alexander D. Wilson, QB
- Henry J. Wiser, HB
