= C. Brainerd Metheny =

American football player and coach

Biographical details
- Born: December 30, 1889; Pittsburgh, Pennsylvania, U.S.
- Died: October 19, 1960; Beaver Falls, Pennsylvania, U.S.

Playing career

Football
- 1910: Geneva
- 1912: Carnegie Tech

Basketball
- 1910–1911: Geneva
- Positions: Halfback, fullback (football)

Coaching career (HC unless noted)

Football
- 1913–1916: Geneva

Basketball
- 1913–1917: Geneva

Administrative career (AD unless noted)
- 1913–1917: Geneva

Head coaching record
- Overall: 17–15–2 (football)

Coligny Brainerd Metheny (December 30, 1889 – October 19, 1960) was an American football and basketball coach, college athletics administrator, and insurance executive. He served as the head football coach at Geneva College in Beaver Falls, Pennsylvania from 1913 to 1916, compiling a record of 17–15–2. Metheny was also the head basketball coach and athletic director at Geneva from 1914 to 1917. He played football and basketball at Geneva and football at the Carnegie Institute of Technology in 1912.

Metheny served as a pilot in the United States Army during World War I. He was later a prominent life insurance executive in Pittsburgh. He was president of Metheny and Associates with an office in the Grant Building. Metheny died on October 19, 1960, at Providence Hospital in Beaver Falls. In 1961, Geneva College named its new field house after Metheny.

== Head coaching record ==
=== College ===
Year	Team	Overall	Conference	Standing	Bowl/playoffs
Geneva Covenanters (Independent) (1913–1916)
1913	Geneva	4–4			
1914	Geneva	5–3			
1915	Geneva	6–3			
1916	Geneva	2–5–2			
Geneva:		17–15–2			
Total:		17–15–2			
