= 1913 Princeton Tigers football team =

American college football season

1913 Princeton Tigers football
- Conference: Independent
- Record: 5–2–1
- Head coach: Walter G. Andrews (1st season)
- Captain: Hobey Baker
- Home stadium: University Field

1913 Eastern college football independents records
	Conf.			Overall
Team	W	L	T	W		L		T
Harvard		–		9	–	0	–	0
Carlisle		–		10	–	1	–	1
Washington & Jefferson		–		10	–	0	–	1
Army		–		8	–	1	–	0
Dartmouth		–		7	–	1	–	0
Tufts		–		7	–	1	–	0
Colgate		–		6	–	1	–	1
Franklin & Marshall		–		6	–	2	–	0
Pittsburgh		–		6	–	2	–	1
Princeton		–		5	–	2	–	1
Yale		–		5	–	2	–	3
Rutgers		–		6	–	3	–	0
Penn		–		6	–	3	–	1
Villanova		–		4	–	2	–	1
Lehigh		–		5	–	3	–	0
Bucknell		–		6	–	4	–	0
Cornell		–		5	–	4	–	1
Boston College		–		4	–	3	–	1
Syracuse		–		6	–	4	–	0
Fordham		–		3	–	3	–	2
Geneva		–		4	–	4	–	0
Lafayette		–		4	–	5	–	1
Brown		–		4	–	5	–	0
Duquesne		–		3	–	5	–	1
Carnegie Tech		–		2	–	4	–	1
Holy Cross		–		3	–	6	–	0
New Hampshire		–		2	–	4	–	0
Temple		–		1	–	3	–	2
Penn State		–		2	–	6	–	0
Rhode Island State		–		2	–	6	–	0
Vermont		–		1	–	5	–	0
NYU		–		0	–	8	–	0

The 1913 Princeton Tigers football team represented Princeton University in the 1913 college football season. The team finished with a 5–2–1 record under first-year head coach Walter G. Andrews. Princeton tackle Harold Ballin was selected as a consensus first-team honoree on the 1913 College Football All-America Team.

== Schedule ==
Date	Opponent	Site	Result	Attendance	Source
September 27	Rutgers	University Field; Princeton, NJ (rivalry)	W 14–3		
October 4	Fordham	University Field; Princeton, NJ	W 69–0		
October 11	Bucknell	University Field; Princeton, NJ	W 28–6		
October 18	Syracuse	University Field; Princeton, NJ	W 13–0		
October 25	Dartmouth	University Field; Princeton, NJ	L 0–6		
November 1	Holy Cross	University Field; Princeton, NJ	W 54–0		
November 8	Harvard	University Field; Princeton, NJ (rivalry)	L 0–3	25,000	
November 15	at Yale	Yale Field; New Haven, CT (rivalry)	T 3–3		
