= 1913 Holy Cross football team =

American college football season

1913 Holy Cross football
- Conference: Independent
- Record: 3–6
- Head coach: Harry von Kersburg (1st season)
- Captain: Wilfred Metivier
- Home stadium: Fitton Field

1913 Eastern college football independents records
	Conf.			Overall
Team	W	L	T	W		L		T
Harvard		–		9	–	0	–	0
Carlisle		–		10	–	1	–	1
Washington & Jefferson		–		10	–	0	–	1
Army		–		8	–	1	–	0
Dartmouth		–		7	–	1	–	0
Tufts		–		7	–	1	–	0
Colgate		–		6	–	1	–	1
Franklin & Marshall		–		6	–	2	–	0
Pittsburgh		–		6	–	2	–	1
Princeton		–		5	–	2	–	1
Yale		–		5	–	2	–	3
Rutgers		–		6	–	3	–	0
Penn		–		6	–	3	–	1
Villanova		–		4	–	2	–	1
Lehigh		–		5	–	3	–	0
Bucknell		–		6	–	4	–	0
Cornell		–		5	–	4	–	1
Boston College		–		4	–	3	–	1
Syracuse		–		6	–	4	–	0
Fordham		–		3	–	3	–	2
Geneva		–		4	–	4	–	0
Lafayette		–		4	–	5	–	1
Brown		–		4	–	5	–	0
Duquesne		–		3	–	5	–	1
Carnegie Tech		–		2	–	4	–	1
Holy Cross		–		3	–	6	–	0
New Hampshire		–		2	–	4	–	0
Temple		–		1	–	3	–	2
Penn State		–		2	–	6	–	0
Rhode Island State		–		2	–	6	–	0
Vermont		–		1	–	5	–	0
NYU		–		0	–	8	–	0

The 1913 Holy Cross football team was an American football team that represented the College of the Holy Cross in the 1913 college football season.

In its first and only year under head coach Harry von Kersburg, the team compiled a 3–6 record. Wilfred Metivier was the team captain.

The season began with a tragedy, as Vernon S. Belyea, a junior halfback at Norwich University, was paralyzed while running back a Holy Cross punt at Fitton Field, and later died. Belyea suffered a fractured sixth vertebra after being tackled by Holy Cross' captain, Metivier. Belyea was taken to Saint Vincent Hospital in Worcester, where he died the following day.

Holy Cross played its home games at Fitton Field on the college campus in Worcester, Massachusetts.

== Schedule ==
Date	Opponent	Site	Result	Source
September 24	Norwich	Fitton Field; Worcester, MA	W 28–0	
September 27	at Yale	Yale Field; New Haven, CT	L 0–7	
October 4	Massachusetts	Fitton Field; Worcester, MA	L 0–6	
October 11	Boston College	Fitton Field; Worcester, MA (rivalry)	W 13–0	
October 18	at Harvard	Harvard Stadium; Boston, MA	L 7–47	
November 1	at Princeton	University Field; Princeton, NJ	L 0–54	
November 8	at Springfield YMCA	Fitton Field; Worcester, MA	L 13–25	
November 15	Fordham	Fitton Field; Worcester, MA (rivalry)	W 60–0	
November 27	at Georgetown	Georgetown Field; Washington, DC	L 7–16	
