= Tom Thorp =

American football player and coach (1884–1942)

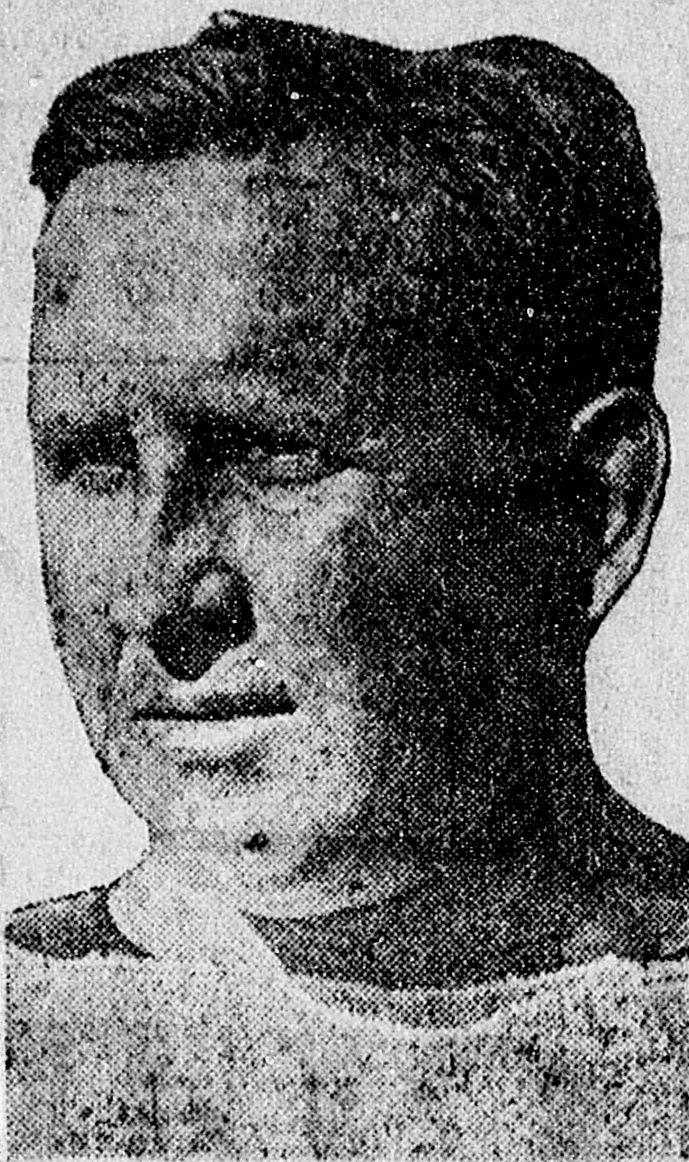
- Thorp circa 1922

Biographical details
- Born: March 6, 1884; New York, New York, U.S.
- Died: July 6, 1942 (aged 58); Cambridge, Massachusetts, U.S.

Playing career
- 1903–1904: Columbia
- Position: Tackle

Coaching career (HC unless noted)
- 1912–1913: Fordham
- 1922–1924: NYU

Head coaching record
- Overall: 21–17–4

Accomplishments and honors

Awards
- 2× Second-team All-American (1903, 1904)

Thomas Joseph Thorp (March 6, 1884 – July 6, 1942) was an American college football player and coach, sports writer, and football and horse racing official. He served as the head football at Fordham University from 1912 to 1913 and New York University (NYU) from 1922 to 1924, compiling a career coaching record of 21–17–4.

== Early years ==
Thorp was born on March 6, 1884, in Manhattan, in the neighborhood known as the Roaring Forties.

Thorp enrolled at Columbia University, where he played at the tackle position for the school's football teams in 1903 and 1904. He was named to Walter Camp's All-America team, and was selected as an All-American in both 1903 and 1904. In October 1905, amid the movement to eradicate professionalism from college football, Columbia's faculty dropped Thorp from the university. The New York Times wrote that Thorp had been "the backbone" of the team and reported that Thorp's expulsion was "the worst blow that Columbia football has received" and a move that "cast the gloom of despair" over the prospects for the Columbia football team in 1905. Upon being expelled from Columbia, Thorp sought admission to Cornell, but he was not able to acquire advance standing. Thorp next went to the University of Virginia, where he was enrolled and played football.

== Sports writer ==
In the late 1900s, Thorp was hired as a sports writer for the New York Journal. He also worked for a time for the New York American and the New York World. He continued to work as a journalist until 1936, when he became employed as a full-time official at horse racing tracks. Following his death in 1942, he was remembered as "a bona fide newspaperman, which is to say ... he was an able, news-chasing, news-writing reporter." The Long Island newspaper Newsday annually presents the Tom Thorp Award, which goes to the outstanding high school football player in Nassau County.

== Coaching and officiating ==
=== Fordham ===
Thorp was head football coach at Fordham University for the 1912 and 1913 seasons, compiling a record of 7–7–2.

=== NYU ===
Thorp was the 18th head football coach a New York University (NYU), serving for three seasons, from 1922 to 1924, and compiling a record of 14–10–2. This ranks him fourth at NYU in total wins and third at NYU in winning percentage.

=== Officiating ===
When he was not coaching, Thorp also worked as an official for college football games. He officiated at many of the significant eastern games and was the first easterner to be invited to officiate at a Rose Bowl Game. He continued officiating at football games until 1940.

== Horse racing steward ==
In his later years, Thorp lived in Rockville Centre, New York. When pari-mutuel was permitted in New England in 1933, Thorp became employed in the horse racing business. He served as the presiding steward at several race tracks, including Suffolk Downs, the Pagodas at Rockingham Park, Narragansett Park, and Tropical Park in Florida. He was also the general manager at the Empire City track in Yonkers, New York, for a time. When Seabiscuit was matched against War Admiral, Thorp was the presiding steward at the race. When post time passed for the race, a crowd of reporters gathered, and it was Thorp who finally delivered the news that "Seabiscuit scratched."

In late June 1942, after presiding over the races at Suffolk Downs, Thorp suffered a heart attack at a Boston hotel; he died a week later at Wyman House in Cambridge, Massachusetts. Thorp was unmarried and was survived by his mother and two brothers.

== Head coaching record ==
Year	Team	Overall	Conference	Standing	Bowl/playoffs
Fordham Maroon (Independent) (1912–1913)
1912	Fordham	4–4			
1913	Fordham	3–3–2			
Fordham:		7–7–2			
NYU Violets (Independent) (1922–1924)
1922	NYU	4–5			
1923	NYU	6–2–1			
1924	NYU	4–3–1			
NYU:		14–10–2			
Total:		21–17–4			
