= 1913 Connecticut Aggies football team =

American college football season

1913 Connecticut Aggies football
- Conference: Athletic League of New England State Colleges
- Record: 5–3 (0–0 New England)
- Head coach: P. T. Brady (1st season)
- Home stadium: Athletic Fields

The 1913 Connecticut Aggies football team represented Connecticut Agricultural College, now the University of Connecticut, in the 1913 college football season. The Aggies were led by first-year head coach P. T. Brady, and completed the season with a record of 5–3.

== Schedule ==
Date	Opponent	Site	Result
September 27	Bulkeley School*	Athletic Fields; Storrs, CT	W 23–0
October 4	at Dean Academy*	Franklin, MA	L 0–40
October 11	Norwich Free Academy*	Athletic Fields; Storrs, CT	W 32–0
October 18	at Monson Academy*	Monson, MA	W 7–0
October 25	Rockville High School*	Athletic Fields; Storrs, CT	W 47–7
November 8	Connecticut Literary Institute*	Athletic Fields; Storrs, CT	W 52–0
November 15	at Stevens*	Hoboken, NJ	L 7–28
November 22	Boston College*	Athletic Fields; Storrs, CT	L 0–47
*Non-conference game
