= Tod Eberle =

American athlete and coach (1886–1967)

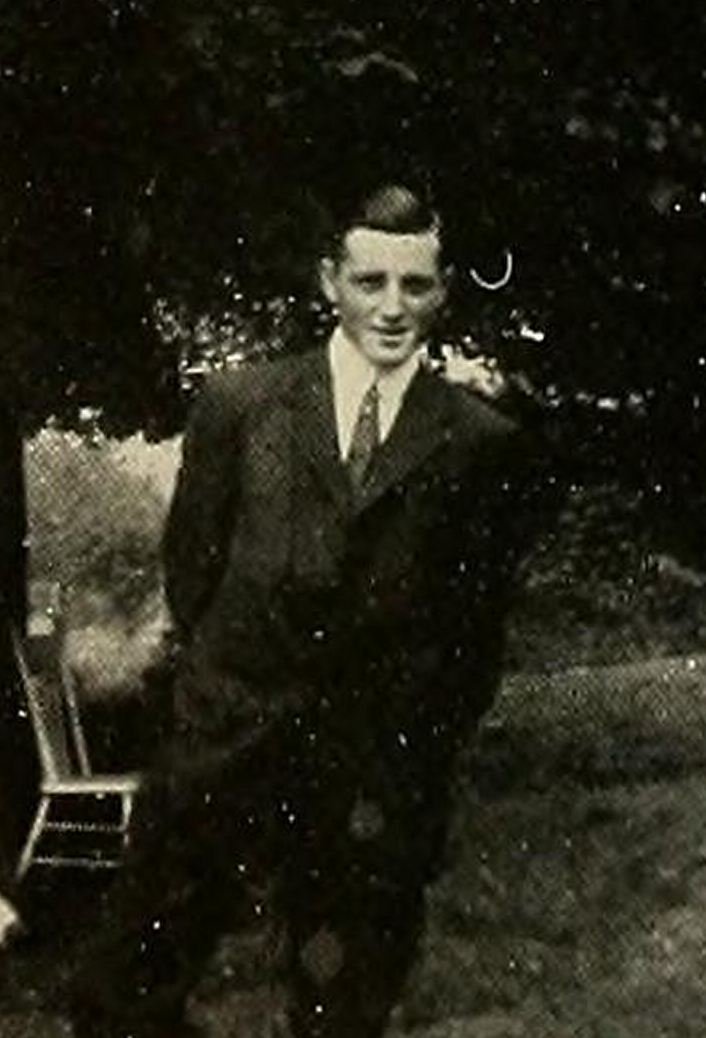
- Eberle pictured in Halcyon 1911, Swarthmore yearbook

Biographical details
- Born: July 4, 1886; Washington, D.C., U.S.
- Died: May 10, 1967 (aged 80); Philadelphia, Pennsylvania, U.S.
- Education: Swarthmore College (1911)

Playing career

Football
- 1907: Swarthmore
- 1909–1910: Swarthmore

Coaching career (HC unless noted)

Football
- 1912–1913: New Hampshire

Basketball
- 1912–1913: New Hampshire
- 1915–1916: Swarthmore

Head coaching record
- Overall: 5–8–1 (football); 15–7 (basketball)

Charles Albert "Tod" Eberle (July 4, 1886 – May 10, 1967) was an American college sports athlete, coach, and official.

== Biography ==
Eberle graduated from Swarthmore College in 1911, where he earned varsity letters in football, basketball, baseball, and track; he was also a member of Kappa Sigma fraternity. He served as captain of the 1910 Swarthmore Quakers football team.

Eberle served as the head football coach at New Hampshire College of Agriculture and the Mechanic Arts (Note: The school became the University of New Hampshire in 1923 and adopted the Wildcats nickname in 1926.) for 1912 and 1913, compiling an overall record of 5–8–1. He was also the head basketball coach for the 1912–13 season, tallying a mark of 5–5. Eberle was apparently well-liked by students—the college yearbook recounted that at the close of his first year, "the entire student body was at the station to cheer him off as a token of their appreciation for his services to New Hampshire."

Eberle later was head basketball coach at Swathmore, compiling a 10–2 record for the 1915–16 basketball season. He was a college football on-field official for multiple seasons, through at least 1922.

Eberle married Anna Oppenlander in November 1914. He died in May 1967, at the age of 80.

== Head coaching record ==
Football

Year	Team	Overall	Conference	Standing	Bowl/playoffs
New Hampshire (Independent) (1912–1913)
1912	New Hampshire	3–4–1			
1913	New Hampshire	2–4			
New Hampshire:		5–8–1			
Total:		5–8–1			
