= George Cobb (coach) =

American football and basketball coach, college athletics administrator

Biographical details
- Born: August 26, 1885; Granby, Massachusetts, U.S.
- Died: February 13, 1957 (aged 71); Salisbury, Maryland, U.S.

Playing career

Football
- 1907: Massachusetts

Coaching career (HC unless noted)

Football
- 1909–1911: Rhode Island State
- 1913–1914: Rhode Island State

Basketball
- 1910–1913: Rhode Island State

Administrative career (AD unless noted)
- 1909–1916: Rhode Island State

Head coaching record
- Overall: 17–16–5 (football); 13–9 (basketball)

George Robert Cobb (August 26, 1885 – February 13, 1957) was an American football and basketball coach and college athletics administrator. He served as the head football coach at Rhode Island State College—now known as the University of Rhode Island—from 1909 to 1911 and again from 1913 to 1914, compiling a record of a 17–16–5. Cobb was also the head basketball coach at Rhode Island State from 1910 to 1913, tallying a mark of 13–9, and the school's athletic director from 1909 to 1916. He graduated from the University of Massachusetts Amherst in 1908. Cobb died on February 13, 1957, as Peninsula General Hospital in Salisbury, Maryland.

== Head coaching record ==
=== Football ===
Year	Team	Overall	Conference	Standing	Bowl/playoffs
Rhode Island State (Athletic League of New England State Colleges) (1909–1911)
1909	Rhode Island State	3–4	0–1		
1910	Rhode Island State	5–1–1	1–1		
1911	Rhode Island State	5–2–1	1–0		
Rhode Island State (Athletic League of New England State Colleges) (1913–1914)
1913	Rhode Island State	2–6	0–0		
1914	Rhode Island State	2–3–3	0–0		
Rhode Island State:		17–16–5	2–2		
Total:		17–16–5			
