= Jake High =

American football player and coach

Playing career
- 1908–1910: Brown
- Position: Fullback

Coaching career (HC unless noted)
- 1912: Wesleyan
- 1913: NYU
- 1914: Brown (assistant)

Head coaching record
- Overall: 7–10

Jake C. High was an American college football player and coach. He played football at the fullback position for Brown University. He was the head football coach at Wesleyan University in 1912 and has the distinction of having the highest career winning percentage (.778) in the 127-year history of the Wesleyan Cardinals football program. He was also the head football coach at New York University (NYU) in 1913 and holds the distinction of having the lowest career winning percentage (.000) in the history of the NYU Violets football program.

== Football player at Brown ==
High played college football at Brown University from 1908 to 1910 at the fullback position. He played on the 1910 Brown team that defeated football powerhouse Yale, 21–0, and stopped Jim Thorpe's Carlisle Indians, 15–6. The 1910 victory over Yale, with High and College Football Hall of Fame inductee Earl Sprackling in the backfield, was the first ever for the Brown football program.

High had the reputation for always running with his mouth wide open. In his 1916 book about college football, former Princeton All-American Big Bill Edwards recounted an incident in which an opposing player made a high tackle and was "unfortunate enough to stick his finger in High's mouth." The opposing player "let out a yell" as High came down on the finger and asked, "What are you biting my finger for?" High replied, "What are you sticking it in my mouth for?"

High graduated from Brown in 1911. In 2003, as part of the 125 anniversary of Brown Bears football, High was named to Brown's All-Decade team for the decade from 1910 to 1919.

== Wesleyan ==
After graduating from Brown, High served as the head coach of the Wesleyan University football team in 1912. He led the Wesleyan Cardinals to a 7–2 record in 1912, including a 7–6 win over his alma mater, Brown. High's 1912 Wesleyan team also won acclaim for scoring against Yale in a close 10–3 defeat to open the season. High's .778 winning percentage as Wesleyan's head football coach ranks first in the 127-year history of Wesleyan football.

== NYU ==
High, who was a resident of Providence, Rhode Island, chose not to return as Wesleyan's head coach in 1913 after having "salary difficulties with the athletic management of the school." He instead took the head football coaching job at New York University for the 1913 season. High's 1913 NYU football team went through the entire season without a win and without scoring a point. In his single season as the head coach at NYU, his team was outscored by 241 points to zero.

The team lost to Muhlenberg by a score of 54–0 and to both Syracuse and Navy by identical scores of 48–0. High's 0–8 record at NYU gives him a .000 winning percentage, the worst in NYU football history.

Despite the poor showing in 1913, NYU students expressed confidence that High had put the team on the right track as reflected in the following newspaper story from January 1914: "Speaking of supreme confidence, New York university students are fighting to keep Jake High, the football coach who piloted the team throughout a whole season without scoring a single point." Also, The New York Times reported that High's work at NYU "was generally commended" and that "it is generally conceded that no criticism can be expressed in regard to High's work, which is admitted to have been first class in view of the material with which he had to do."

== Later years ==
In 1914, High joined the coaching staff at Brown University. He later engaged in business in New York City.

== Head coaching record ==
Year	Team	Overall	Conference	Standing	Bowl/playoffs
Wesleyan Methodists (Independent) (1912)
1912	Wesleyan	7–2			
Wesleyan:		7–2			
NYU Violets (Independent) (1913)
1913	NYU	0–8			
NYU:		0–8			
Total:		7–10			
