= 1913 Boston College football team =

American college football season

1913 Boston College football
- Conference: Independent
- Record: 4–3–1
- Head coach: William Joy (2nd season)
- Captain: D. Leo Daley

1913 Eastern college football independents records
	Conf.			Overall
Team	W	L	T	W		L		T
Harvard		–		9	–	0	–	0
Carlisle		–		10	–	1	–	1
Washington & Jefferson		–		10	–	0	–	1
Army		–		8	–	1	–	0
Dartmouth		–		7	–	1	–	0
Tufts		–		7	–	1	–	0
Colgate		–		6	–	1	–	1
Franklin & Marshall		–		6	–	2	–	0
Pittsburgh		–		6	–	2	–	1
Princeton		–		5	–	2	–	1
Yale		–		5	–	2	–	3
Rutgers		–		6	–	3	–	0
Penn		–		6	–	3	–	1
Villanova		–		4	–	2	–	1
Lehigh		–		5	–	3	–	0
Bucknell		–		6	–	4	–	0
Cornell		–		5	–	4	–	1
Boston College		–		4	–	3	–	1
Syracuse		–		6	–	4	–	0
Fordham		–		3	–	3	–	2
Geneva		–		4	–	4	–	0
Lafayette		–		4	–	5	–	1
Brown		–		4	–	5	–	0
Duquesne		–		3	–	5	–	1
Carnegie Tech		–		2	–	4	–	1
Holy Cross		–		3	–	6	–	0
New Hampshire		–		2	–	4	–	0
Temple		–		1	–	3	–	2
Penn State		–		2	–	6	–	0
Rhode Island State		–		2	–	6	–	0
Vermont		–		1	–	5	–	0
NYU		–		0	–	8	–	0

The 1913 Boston College football team was an American football team that represented Boston College as an independent during the 1913 college football season. Led by William Joy in his second and final season as head coach, Boston College compiled a record of 4–3–1.

== Schedule ==
Date	Opponent	Site	Result	Source
September 20	at Maine	Orono, ME	L 0–6	
October 4	at Springfield College	Springfield, MA	L 6–27	
October 11	at Holy Cross	Fitton Field; Worcester, MA (rivalry)	L 0–13	
October 18	at Saint Anselm	Manchester, NH	W 19–0	
October 25	at New Hampshire	Durham, NH	Cancelled (Note: The New Hampshire game was cancelled due to heavy rain.)	
November 1	at Worcester Tech		W 40–0	
November 8	at Fordham	Fordham Field; Bronx, NY	T 27–27	
November 15	at Rhode Island State	Kingston, RI	W 27–0	
November 22	at Connecticut	Athletic Fields; Storrs, CT	W 47–0	
