= Otis Guernsey Jr. =

American writer

Otis Guernsey Jr.

Otis Love Guernsey Jr. (August 9, 1918 – May 2, 2001) was an American journalist, writer, and editor of books about theatre. He was a former arts editor of the New York Herald Tribune and edited 36 volumes of the Best Plays series (formally The Best Plays Theater Yearbook).

Guernsey had the idea which influenced the plot of Alfred Hitchcock's 1959 thriller North by Northwest. Guernsey was inspired by a true story during World War II when British Intelligence obtained a dead body, invented a fictitious officer who was carrying secret papers, and arranged for the body and misleading papers to be discovered by the Germans as a disinformation scheme called Operation Mincemeat. Guernsey turned his idea into a story about an American salesman who travels to the Middle East and is mistaken for a fictitious agent, becoming "saddled with a romantic and dangerous identity". Guernsey admitted that his treatment was full of "corn" and "lacking logic", and he urged Hitchcock to do what he liked with the story. Hitchcock bought the 60 pages for $10,000.

Guernsey was inducted into the American Theater Hall of Fame on January 29, 2001.

His father was Otis Guernsey a college footballer and later CEO of Abercrombie & Fitch.
