= 1913 Lehigh Brown and White football team =

American college football season

1913 Lehigh Brown and White football
- Conference: Independent
- Record: 5–3
- Head coach: Tom Keady (2nd season)
- Home stadium: Taylor Field

1913 Eastern college football independents records
	Conf.			Overall
Team	W	L	T	W		L		T
Harvard		–		9	–	0	–	0
Carlisle		–		10	–	1	–	1
Washington & Jefferson		–		10	–	0	–	1
Army		–		8	–	1	–	0
Dartmouth		–		7	–	1	–	0
Tufts		–		7	–	1	–	0
Colgate		–		6	–	1	–	1
Franklin & Marshall		–		6	–	2	–	0
Pittsburgh		–		6	–	2	–	1
Princeton		–		5	–	2	–	1
Yale		–		5	–	2	–	3
Rutgers		–		6	–	3	–	0
Penn		–		6	–	3	–	1
Villanova		–		4	–	2	–	1
Lehigh		–		5	–	3	–	0
Bucknell		–		6	–	4	–	0
Cornell		–		5	–	4	–	1
Boston College		–		4	–	3	–	1
Syracuse		–		6	–	4	–	0
Fordham		–		3	–	3	–	2
Geneva		–		4	–	4	–	0
Lafayette		–		4	–	5	–	1
Brown		–		4	–	5	–	0
Duquesne		–		3	–	5	–	1
Carnegie Tech		–		2	–	4	–	1
Holy Cross		–		3	–	6	–	0
New Hampshire		–		2	–	4	–	0
Temple		–		1	–	3	–	2
Penn State		–		2	–	6	–	0
Rhode Island State		–		2	–	6	–	0
Vermont		–		1	–	5	–	0
NYU		–		0	–	8	–	0

The 1913 Lehigh Brown and White football team was an American football team that represented Lehigh University as an independent during the 1913 college football season. In its second season under head coach Tom Keady, the team compiled a 5–3 record and outscored opponents by a total of 152 to 100.

== Schedule ==
Date	Opponent	Site	Result	Source
September 27	Albright	Taylor Field; South Bethlehem, PA	W 64–0	
October 4	Carlisle	Taylor Field; South Bethlehem, PA	L 7–21	
October 18	at Yale	Yale Field; New Haven, CT	L 0–37	
October 25	Muhlenberg	Taylor Field; South Bethlehem, PA	W 7–0	
November 1	at Navy	Worden Field; Annapolis, MD	L 0–39	
November 8	Swarthmore	Taylor Field; South Bethlehem, PA	W 50–0	
November 15	Haverford	Taylor Field; South Bethlehem, PA	W 17–3	
November 22	Lafayette	Taylor Field; South Bethlehem, PA (rivalry)	W 7–0	
