= 1913 Villanova Wildcats football team =

American college football season

1913 Villanova Wildcats football
- Conference: Independent
- Record: 4–2–1
- Head coach: Ted St. Germaine (1st season)
- Captain: Arthur Frost
- Home stadium: none

1913 Eastern college football independents records
	Conf.			Overall
Team	W	L	T	W		L		T
Harvard		–		9	–	0	–	0
Carlisle		–		10	–	1	–	1
Washington & Jefferson		–		10	–	0	–	1
Army		–		8	–	1	–	0
Dartmouth		–		7	–	1	–	0
Tufts		–		7	–	1	–	0
Colgate		–		6	–	1	–	1
Franklin & Marshall		–		6	–	2	–	0
Pittsburgh		–		6	–	2	–	1
Princeton		–		5	–	2	–	1
Yale		–		5	–	2	–	3
Rutgers		–		6	–	3	–	0
Penn		–		6	–	3	–	1
Villanova		–		4	–	2	–	1
Lehigh		–		5	–	3	–	0
Bucknell		–		6	–	4	–	0
Cornell		–		5	–	4	–	1
Boston College		–		4	–	3	–	1
Syracuse		–		6	–	4	–	0
Fordham		–		3	–	3	–	2
Geneva		–		4	–	4	–	0
Lafayette		–		4	–	5	–	1
Brown		–		4	–	5	–	0
Duquesne		–		3	–	5	–	1
Carnegie Tech		–		2	–	4	–	1
Holy Cross		–		3	–	6	–	0
New Hampshire		–		2	–	4	–	0
Temple		–		1	–	3	–	2
Penn State		–		2	–	6	–	0
Rhode Island State		–		2	–	6	–	0
Vermont		–		1	–	5	–	0
NYU		–		0	–	8	–	0

The 1913 Villanova Wildcats football team represented the Villanova University during the 1913 college football season. The Wildcats team captain was Arthur Frost.

== Schedule ==
Date	Opponent	Site	Result	Source
October 4	at Swarthmore	Whittier Field; Swarthmore, PA	T 0–0	
	Dickinson	Villanova, PA	W 20–0	
October 18	at Ursinus	Collegeville, PA	W 10–7	
November 4	at Fordham	Fordham Field; Bronx, NY	W 43–0	
November 8	Catholic University	Washington, DC	W 37–0	
November 15	at Army	The Plain; West Point, NY	L 0–55	
November 27	at West Virginia	Morgantown, WV	L 0–7	
