= 1913 Brown Bears football team =

American college football season

1913 Brown Bears football
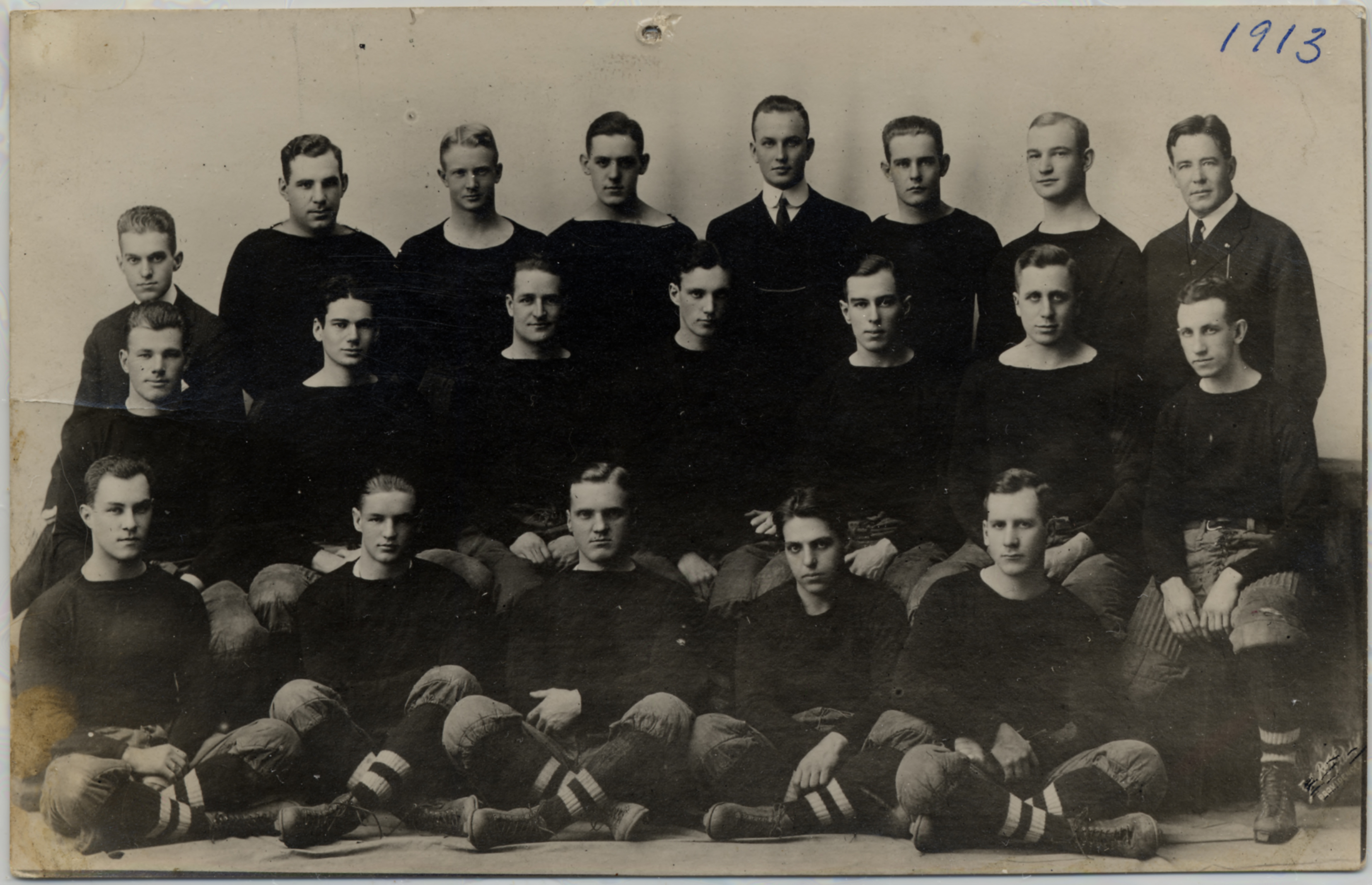
- Conference: Independent
- Record: 4–5
- Head coach: Edward N. Robinson (12th season)
- Captain: D. Henry
- Home stadium: Andrews Field

1913 Eastern college football independents records
| | Conf. | | | Overall |
| Team | W | L | T | W | | L | | T |
|---|---|---|---|---|---|---|---|---|
| Harvard | | – | | 9 | – | 0 | – | 0 |
| Carlisle | | – | | 10 | – | 1 | – | 1 |
| Washington & Jefferson | | – | | 10 | – | 0 | – | 1 |
| Army | | – | | 8 | – | 1 | – | 0 |
| Dartmouth | | – | | 7 | – | 1 | – | 0 |
| Tufts | | – | | 7 | – | 1 | – | 0 |
| Colgate | | – | | 6 | – | 1 | – | 1 |
| Franklin & Marshall | | – | | 6 | – | 2 | – | 0 |
| Pittsburgh | | – | | 6 | – | 2 | – | 1 |
| Princeton | | – | | 5 | – | 2 | – | 1 |
| Yale | | – | | 5 | – | 2 | – | 3 |
| Rutgers | | – | | 6 | – | 3 | – | 0 |
| Penn | | – | | 6 | – | 3 | – | 1 |
| Villanova | | – | | 4 | – | 2 | – | 1 |
| Lehigh | | – | | 5 | – | 3 | – | 0 |
| Bucknell | | – | | 6 | – | 4 | – | 0 |
| Cornell | | – | | 5 | – | 4 | – | 1 |
| Boston College | | – | | 4 | – | 3 | – | 1 |
| Syracuse | | – | | 6 | – | 4 | – | 0 |
| Fordham | | – | | 3 | – | 3 | – | 2 |
| Geneva | | – | | 4 | – | 4 | – | 0 |
| Lafayette | | – | | 4 | – | 5 | – | 1 |
| Brown | | – | | 4 | – | 5 | – | 0 |
| Duquesne | | – | | 3 | – | 5 | – | 1 |
| Carnegie Tech | | – | | 2 | – | 4 | – | 1 |
| Holy Cross | | – | | 3 | – | 6 | – | 0 |
| New Hampshire | | – | | 2 | – | 4 | – | 0 |
| Temple | | – | | 1 | – | 3 | – | 2 |
| Penn State | | – | | 2 | – | 6 | – | 0 |
| Rhode Island State | | – | | 2 | – | 6 | – | 0 |
| Vermont | | – | | 1 | – | 5 | – | 0 |
| NYU | | – | | 0 | – | 8 | – | 0 |

The 1913 Brown Bears football team represented Brown University as an independent during the 1913 college football season. Led by 12th-year head coach Edward N. Robinson, Brown compiled a record of 4–5.

== Schedule ==
| Date | Opponent | Site | Result | Source |
|---|---|---|---|---|
| September 27 | Colby | Andrews Field; Providence, RI | L 0–10 | |
| October 4 | Rhode Island State | Andrews Field; Providence, RI (rivalry) | W 19–0 | |
| October 11 | Ursinus | Andrews Field; Providence, RI | W 6–0 | |
| October 18 | at Penn | Franklin Field; Philadelphia, PA | L 0–28 | |
| October 25 | Springfield | Andrews Field; Providence, RI | W 28–6 | |
| November 1 | Vermont | Andrews Field; Providence, RI | W 19–0 | |
| November 8 | at Yale | Yale Field; New Haven, CT | L 0–17 | |
| November 15 | at Harvard | Harvard Stadium; Boston, MA | L 0–37 | |
| November 27 | Carlisle | Andrews Field; Providence, RI | L 0–13 | |
