= 1913 Colgate football team =

American college football season

1913 Colgate football
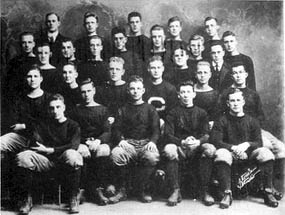
- Conference: Independent
- Record: 6–1–1
- Head coach: Laurence Bankart (2nd season)
- Captain: Frederick Peterson
- Home stadium: Whitnall Field

1913 Eastern college football independents records
| | Conf. | | | Overall |
| Team | W | L | T | W | | L | | T |
|---|---|---|---|---|---|---|---|---|
| Harvard | | – | | 9 | – | 0 | – | 0 |
| Carlisle | | – | | 10 | – | 1 | – | 1 |
| Washington & Jefferson | | – | | 10 | – | 0 | – | 1 |
| Army | | – | | 8 | – | 1 | – | 0 |
| Dartmouth | | – | | 7 | – | 1 | – | 0 |
| Tufts | | – | | 7 | – | 1 | – | 0 |
| Colgate | | – | | 6 | – | 1 | – | 1 |
| Franklin & Marshall | | – | | 6 | – | 2 | – | 0 |
| Pittsburgh | | – | | 6 | – | 2 | – | 1 |
| Princeton | | – | | 5 | – | 2 | – | 1 |
| Yale | | – | | 5 | – | 2 | – | 3 |
| Rutgers | | – | | 6 | – | 3 | – | 0 |
| Penn | | – | | 6 | – | 3 | – | 1 |
| Villanova | | – | | 4 | – | 2 | – | 1 |
| Lehigh | | – | | 5 | – | 3 | – | 0 |
| Bucknell | | – | | 6 | – | 4 | – | 0 |
| Cornell | | – | | 5 | – | 4 | – | 1 |
| Boston College | | – | | 4 | – | 3 | – | 1 |
| Syracuse | | – | | 6 | – | 4 | – | 0 |
| Fordham | | – | | 3 | – | 3 | – | 2 |
| Geneva | | – | | 4 | – | 4 | – | 0 |
| Lafayette | | – | | 4 | – | 5 | – | 1 |
| Brown | | – | | 4 | – | 5 | – | 0 |
| Duquesne | | – | | 3 | – | 5 | – | 1 |
| Carnegie Tech | | – | | 2 | – | 4 | – | 1 |
| Holy Cross | | – | | 3 | – | 6 | – | 0 |
| New Hampshire | | – | | 2 | – | 4 | – | 0 |
| Temple | | – | | 1 | – | 3 | – | 2 |
| Penn State | | – | | 2 | – | 6 | – | 0 |
| Rhode Island State | | – | | 2 | – | 6 | – | 0 |
| Vermont | | – | | 1 | – | 5 | – | 0 |
| NYU | | – | | 0 | – | 8 | – | 0 |

The 1913 Colgate football team was an American football team that represented Colgate University as an independent during the 1913 college football season. In its second season under head coach Laurence Bankart, the team compiled a 6–1–1 record. Frederick Peterson was the team captain. The team played its home games on Whitnall Field in Hamilton, New York.

== Schedule ==
| Date | Opponent | Site | Result |
|---|---|---|---|
| October 1 | at Cornell | Ithaca, NY (rivalry) | T 0–0 |
| October 4 | Amherst | Hamilton, NY | W 21–0 |
| October 11 | Hobart | Hamilton, NY | W 46–0 |
| October 18 | at Army | The Plain; West Point, NY | L 6–7 |
| October 25 | at Trinity (CT) | Hartford, CT | W 6–0 |
| November 1 | at Yale | Yale Field; New Haven, CT | W 16–6 |
| November 8 | Rochester | Hamilton, NY | W 27–0 |
| November 15 | at Syracuse | Archbold Stadium; Syracuse, NY (rivalry) | W 35–13 |
