= 1913 Lafayette football team =

American football club

1913 Lafayette football
- Conference: Independent
- Record: 4–5–1
- Head coach: George McCaa (2nd season)
- Captain: William Wagenhurst
- Home stadium: March Field

1913 Eastern college football independents records
	Conf.			Overall
Team	W	L	T	W		L		T
Harvard		–		9	–	0	–	0
Carlisle		–		10	–	1	–	1
Washington & Jefferson		–		10	–	0	–	1
Army		–		8	–	1	–	0
Dartmouth		–		7	–	1	–	0
Tufts		–		7	–	1	–	0
Colgate		–		6	–	1	–	1
Franklin & Marshall		–		6	–	2	–	0
Pittsburgh		–		6	–	2	–	1
Princeton		–		5	–	2	–	1
Yale		–		5	–	2	–	3
Rutgers		–		6	–	3	–	0
Penn		–		6	–	3	–	1
Villanova		–		4	–	2	–	1
Lehigh		–		5	–	3	–	0
Bucknell		–		6	–	4	–	0
Cornell		–		5	–	4	–	1
Boston College		–		4	–	3	–	1
Syracuse		–		6	–	4	–	0
Fordham		–		3	–	3	–	2
Geneva		–		4	–	4	–	0
Lafayette		–		4	–	5	–	1
Brown		–		4	–	5	–	0
Duquesne		–		3	–	5	–	1
Carnegie Tech		–		2	–	4	–	1
Holy Cross		–		3	–	6	–	0
New Hampshire		–		2	–	4	–	0
Temple		–		1	–	3	–	2
Penn State		–		2	–	6	–	0
Rhode Island State		–		2	–	6	–	0
Vermont		–		1	–	5	–	0
NYU		–		0	–	8	–	0

The 1913 Lafayette football team was an American football team that represented Lafayette College as an independent during the 1913 college football season. In its second and final season under head coach George McCaa, the team compiled an 4–5–1 record. William Wagenhurst was the team captain. The team played its home games at March Field in Easton, Pennsylvania.

== Schedule ==
Date	Opponent	Site	Result	Source
September 27	Muhlenberg	March Field; Easton, PA	T 7–7	
October 4	at Penn	Franklin Field; Philadelphia, PA	L 0–10	
October 11	at Yale	Yale Field; New Haven, CT	L 0–27	
October 18	Swarthmore	March Field; Easton, PA	W 19–0	
October 25	Albright	March Field; Easton, PA	W 7–0	
November 1	Ursinus	March Field; Easton, PA	W 44–2	
November 8	at Pittsburgh	Forbes Field; Pittsburgh, PA	L 0–13	
November 15	at Cornell	Percy Field; Ithaca, NY	L 3–10	
November 22	at Lehigh	Bethlehem, PA (rivalry)	L 0–7	
November 27	Dickinson	March Field; Easton, PA	W 7–0	
