= 1913 Washington & Jefferson Red and Black football team =

American college football season

1913 Washington & Jefferson Red and Black football
- Conference: Independent
- Record: 10–0–1
- Head coach: Bob Folwell (2nd season)

1913 Eastern college football independents records
	Conf.			Overall
Team	W	L	T	W		L		T
Harvard		–		9	–	0	–	0
Carlisle		–		10	–	1	–	1
Washington & Jefferson		–		10	–	0	–	1
Army		–		8	–	1	–	0
Dartmouth		–		7	–	1	–	0
Tufts		–		7	–	1	–	0
Colgate		–		6	–	1	–	1
Franklin & Marshall		–		6	–	2	–	0
Pittsburgh		–		6	–	2	–	1
Princeton		–		5	–	2	–	1
Yale		–		5	–	2	–	3
Rutgers		–		6	–	3	–	0
Penn		–		6	–	3	–	1
Villanova		–		4	–	2	–	1
Lehigh		–		5	–	3	–	0
Bucknell		–		6	–	4	–	0
Cornell		–		5	–	4	–	1
Boston College		–		4	–	3	–	1
Syracuse		–		6	–	4	–	0
Fordham		–		3	–	3	–	2
Geneva		–		4	–	4	–	0
Lafayette		–		4	–	5	–	1
Brown		–		4	–	5	–	0
Duquesne		–		3	–	5	–	1
Carnegie Tech		–		2	–	4	–	1
Holy Cross		–		3	–	6	–	0
New Hampshire		–		2	–	4	–	0
Temple		–		1	–	3	–	2
Penn State		–		2	–	6	–	0
Rhode Island State		–		2	–	6	–	0
Vermont		–		1	–	5	–	0
NYU		–		0	–	8	–	0

The 1913 Washington & Jefferson Red and Black football team was an American football team that represented Washington & Jefferson College as an independent during the 1913 college football season. In their second year under head Bob Folwell, Washington & Jefferson compiled a 10–0–1 record, shut out nine of eleven opponents, and outscored all opponents by a total of 359 to 13. The Red and Black defeated major Eastern powers Penn State (17–0), Pittsburgh (18–6), and West Virginia Wesleyan (34–0), and played Yale to a scoreless tie. In the most one-sided contest of the year, they defeated Grove City by a score of 100–0. Their point total was more than 50 points higher than any other team -- Navy placed second with 304 points.

Halfback Johnny Spiegel was the leading scorer in the country, tallying 127 points and 21 touchdowns. Coach Folwell called Spiegel "the marvel of the football world." At the end of the season, he was selected by Walter Camp as a second-team player on his 1913 All-America team.

== Schedule ==
Date	Time	Opponent	Site	Result	Attendance	Source
September 27		Mount Union	Washington, PA	W 35–0	2,000	
October 4		Dickinson	College Field; Washington, PA	W 26–0		
October 11		Westminster (PA)	Washington, PA	W 27–7		
October 18		Penn State	Washington, PA	W 17–0	7,000	
October 25		at Yale	Yale Field; New Haven, CT	T 0–0		
November 1		Grove City	Washington, PA	W 100–0		
November 8		at West Virginia	Morgantown, WV	W 34–0	2,000	
November 15	2:30 p.m.	at Pittsburgh	Forbes Field; Pittsburgh, PA	W 18–6	25,000	
November 22		vs. West Virginia Wesleyan	Clarksburg, WV	W 35–0		
November 27		Bucknell	Washington, PA	W 52–0		
November 29		at Staats Athletic Club	Wheeling, WV	W 15–0		
