= 1913 Vermont Green and Gold football team =

American college football season

1913 Vermont Green and Gold football
- Conference: Independent
- Record: 1–5
- Head coach: Jere O'Brien (1st season)
- Home stadium: Centennial Field

1913 Eastern college football independents records
| | Conf. | | | Overall |
| Team | W | L | T | W | | L | | T |
|---|---|---|---|---|---|---|---|---|
| Harvard | | – | | 9 | – | 0 | – | 0 |
| Carlisle | | – | | 10 | – | 1 | – | 1 |
| Washington & Jefferson | | – | | 10 | – | 0 | – | 1 |
| Army | | – | | 8 | – | 1 | – | 0 |
| Dartmouth | | – | | 7 | – | 1 | – | 0 |
| Tufts | | – | | 7 | – | 1 | – | 0 |
| Colgate | | – | | 6 | – | 1 | – | 1 |
| Franklin & Marshall | | – | | 6 | – | 2 | – | 0 |
| Pittsburgh | | – | | 6 | – | 2 | – | 1 |
| Princeton | | – | | 5 | – | 2 | – | 1 |
| Yale | | – | | 5 | – | 2 | – | 3 |
| Rutgers | | – | | 6 | – | 3 | – | 0 |
| Penn | | – | | 6 | – | 3 | – | 1 |
| Villanova | | – | | 4 | – | 2 | – | 1 |
| Lehigh | | – | | 5 | – | 3 | – | 0 |
| Bucknell | | – | | 6 | – | 4 | – | 0 |
| Cornell | | – | | 5 | – | 4 | – | 1 |
| Boston College | | – | | 4 | – | 3 | – | 1 |
| Syracuse | | – | | 6 | – | 4 | – | 0 |
| Fordham | | – | | 3 | – | 3 | – | 2 |
| Geneva | | – | | 4 | – | 4 | – | 0 |
| Lafayette | | – | | 4 | – | 5 | – | 1 |
| Brown | | – | | 4 | – | 5 | – | 0 |
| Duquesne | | – | | 3 | – | 5 | – | 1 |
| Carnegie Tech | | – | | 2 | – | 4 | – | 1 |
| Holy Cross | | – | | 3 | – | 6 | – | 0 |
| New Hampshire | | – | | 2 | – | 4 | – | 0 |
| Temple | | – | | 1 | – | 3 | – | 2 |
| Penn State | | – | | 2 | – | 6 | – | 0 |
| Rhode Island State | | – | | 2 | – | 6 | – | 0 |
| Vermont | | – | | 1 | – | 5 | – | 0 |
| NYU | | – | | 0 | – | 8 | – | 0 |

The 1913 Vermont Green and Gold football team was an American football team that represented the University of Vermont as an independent during the 1913 college football season. In their first year under head coach Jere O'Brien, the team compiled a 1–5 record.

== Schedule ==
| Date | Opponent | Site | Result | Source |
|---|---|---|---|---|
| October 1 | Middlebury | Centennial Field; Burlington, VT | W 10–7 | |
| October 4 | at Williams | Weston Field; Williamstown, MA | L 0–20 | |
| October 11 | at Dartmouth | Alumni Oval; Hanover, NH | L 7–33 | |
| October 18 | Bowdoin | Centennial Field; Burlington, VT | L 3–13 | |
| October 25 | at Fordham | Fordham Field; Bronx, NY | No contest | |
| November 1 | at Brown | Andrews Field; Providence, RI | L 0–19 | |
| November 8 | at Tufts | Tufts Oval; Medford, MA | L 0–34 | |
