= 1913 Rutgers Queensmen football team =

American college football season

1913 Rutgers Queensmen football
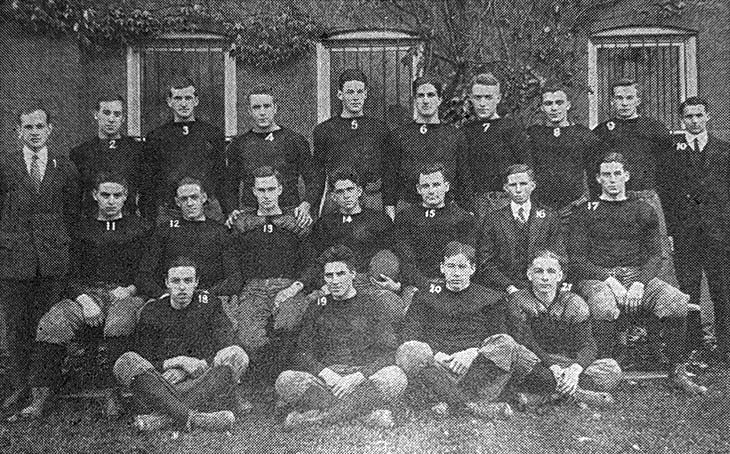
- Conference: Independent
- Record: 6–3
- Head coach: George Sanford (1st season)
- Home stadium: Neilson Field

1913 Eastern college football independents records
	Conf.			Overall
Team	W	L	T	W		L		T
Harvard		–		9	–	0	–	0
Carlisle		–		10	–	1	–	1
Washington & Jefferson		–		10	–	0	–	1
Army		–		8	–	1	–	0
Dartmouth		–		7	–	1	–	0
Tufts		–		7	–	1	–	0
Colgate		–		6	–	1	–	1
Franklin & Marshall		–		6	–	2	–	0
Pittsburgh		–		6	–	2	–	1
Princeton		–		5	–	2	–	1
Yale		–		5	–	2	–	3
Rutgers		–		6	–	3	–	0
Penn		–		6	–	3	–	1
Villanova		–		4	–	2	–	1
Lehigh		–		5	–	3	–	0
Bucknell		–		6	–	4	–	0
Cornell		–		5	–	4	–	1
Boston College		–		4	–	3	–	1
Syracuse		–		6	–	4	–	0
Fordham		–		3	–	3	–	2
Geneva		–		4	–	4	–	0
Lafayette		–		4	–	5	–	1
Brown		–		4	–	5	–	0
Duquesne		–		3	–	5	–	1
Carnegie Tech		–		2	–	4	–	1
Holy Cross		–		3	–	6	–	0
New Hampshire		–		2	–	4	–	0
Temple		–		1	–	3	–	2
Penn State		–		2	–	6	–	0
Rhode Island State		–		2	–	6	–	0
Vermont		–		1	–	5	–	0
NYU		–		0	–	8	–	0

The 1913 Rutgers Queensmen football team represented Rutgers University as an independent during the 1913 college football season. In their first season under head coach George Sanford, the Queensmen compiled a 6–3 record and outscored their opponents, 247 to 76. Sanford remained at Rutgers for 11 years and was inducted into the College Football Hall of Fame in 1971.

== Schedule ==
Date	Opponent	Site	Result	Source
September 27	at Princeton	University Field; Princeton, NJ (rivalry)	L 3–14	
October 4	Union (NY)	Neilson Field; New Brunswick, NJ	W 39–6	
October 11	at Army	The Plain; West Point, NY	L 0–29	
October 18	Hobart	Neilson Field; New Brunswick, NJ	W 71–0	
October 25	at RPI	Troy, NY	W 13–0	
November 1	Wesleyan	Neilson Field; New Brunswick, NJ	L 9–20	
November 8	at Hamilton	Steuben Field; Clinton, NY	W 38–0	
November 15	Trinity (CT)	Neilson Field; New Brunswick, NJ	W 37–7	
November 22	at Stevens	Stevens Field; Hoboken, NJ	W 37–0	
