= 1913 New Hampshire football team =

American college football season

1913 New Hampshire football
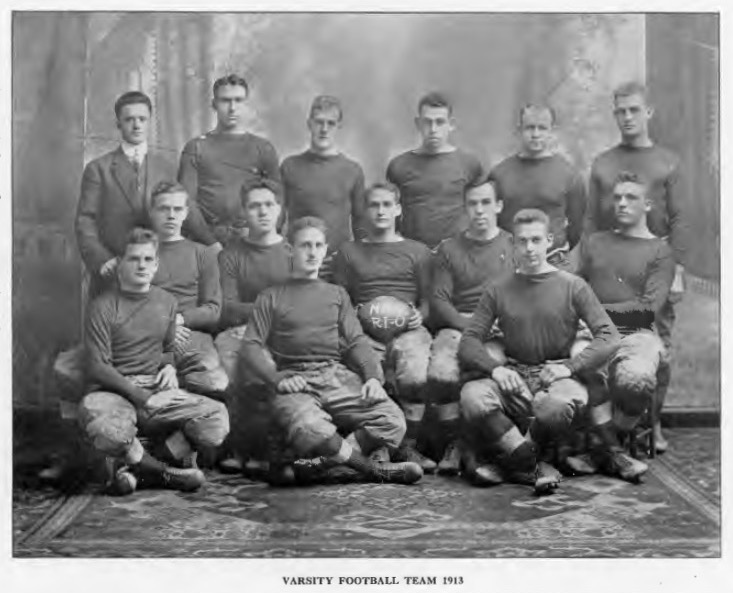
- Conference: Independent
- Record: 2–4
- Head coach: Tod Eberle (2nd season)
- Captain: William H. L. Brackett
- Home stadium: College grounds, Durham, NH

1913 Eastern college football independents records
	Conf.			Overall
Team	W	L	T	W		L		T
Harvard		–		9	–	0	–	0
Carlisle		–		10	–	1	–	1
Washington & Jefferson		–		10	–	0	–	1
Army		–		8	–	1	–	0
Dartmouth		–		7	–	1	–	0
Tufts		–		7	–	1	–	0
Colgate		–		6	–	1	–	1
Franklin & Marshall		–		6	–	2	–	0
Pittsburgh		–		6	–	2	–	1
Princeton		–		5	–	2	–	1
Yale		–		5	–	2	–	3
Rutgers		–		6	–	3	–	0
Penn		–		6	–	3	–	1
Villanova		–		4	–	2	–	1
Lehigh		–		5	–	3	–	0
Bucknell		–		6	–	4	–	0
Cornell		–		5	–	4	–	1
Boston College		–		4	–	3	–	1
Syracuse		–		6	–	4	–	0
Fordham		–		3	–	3	–	2
Geneva		–		4	–	4	–	0
Lafayette		–		4	–	5	–	1
Brown		–		4	–	5	–	0
Duquesne		–		3	–	5	–	1
Carnegie Tech		–		2	–	4	–	1
Holy Cross		–		3	–	6	–	0
New Hampshire		–		2	–	4	–	0
Temple		–		1	–	3	–	2
Penn State		–		2	–	6	–	0
Rhode Island State		–		2	–	6	–	0
Vermont		–		1	–	5	–	0
NYU		–		0	–	8	–	0

The 1913 New Hampshire football team (Note: The school did not adopt the Wildcats nickname until February 1926; before then, they were generally referred to as "the blue and white".) was an American football team that represented New Hampshire College of Agriculture and the Mechanic Arts (Note: The school was often referred to as New Hampshire College or New Hampshire State College in newspapers of the era.) during the 1913 college football season—the school became the University of New Hampshire in 1923. Under second-year head coach Tod Eberle, the team finished with a record of 2–4.

== Schedule ==
During this era, teams played in the one-platoon system. This was the second season using scoring values consistent with the present day: six points for a touchdown, one point for a conversion kick (extra point), and three points for a field goal. (Note: For additional detail, see Early history of American football#Scoring table.)

Date	Opponent	Site	Result	Attendance	Source
September 27	at Bowdoin	Brunswick, ME	L 0–17		
October 4	at Tufts	Medford, MA	L 0–52		
October 11	Bates	Durham, NH	L 6–7		
October 18	Worcester Tech	Durham, NH	W 45–0		
October 25	Boston College	Durham, NH	Cancelled (Note: The Boston College game was cancelled due to heavy rain.)		
November 1	Rhode Island State	Durham, NH	W 12–0	400	
November 8	Massachusetts	Textile Field; Manchester, NH (rivalry)	L 0–34	1,200	

== Team ==
Player	Class	Position
Kyle C. Westover	1917	Left end
John F. Thompson	1915	Left tackle
Raymond W. Huse	1915, 2-Year	Left tackle
Timothy P. Reardon	1914	Left guard
Armand L. Murdock	1915	Center
Paul E. Corriveau (Note: Corriveau was killed in action in France in 1918 while serving in the United States Marine Corps.)	1915	Right guard
Ray E. Haines	1915	Right tackle
Walter F. Parker	1915	Right end
William H. L. Brackett	1914	Quarterback
James F. Hobbs	1915	Left halfback
Ralph H. Bissell	"Special"	Right halfback
Harold G. Woodman	1914, 2-Year	Fullback
Henry M. Hale	1915, 2-Year	Fullback

Manager: John E. Davis, class of 1914

Each of the above players, except members of the class of 1914 (Brackett, Reardon, and Woodman), appeared in a list of varsity letter winners in the school's 1916 yearbook. As the policy of this era was to award varsity letters to 13 players plus the team's student manager, and the 1916 yearbook summarized two seasons of football play (as no 1915 yearbook was published), it is inferred that Brackett, Reardon, Woodman, and Davis also received letters.

Team captain Brackett was inducted to the UNH Athletics Hall of Fame in 1982.
