= 1913 Penn State Nittany Lions football team =

American college football season

1913 Penn State Nittany Lions football
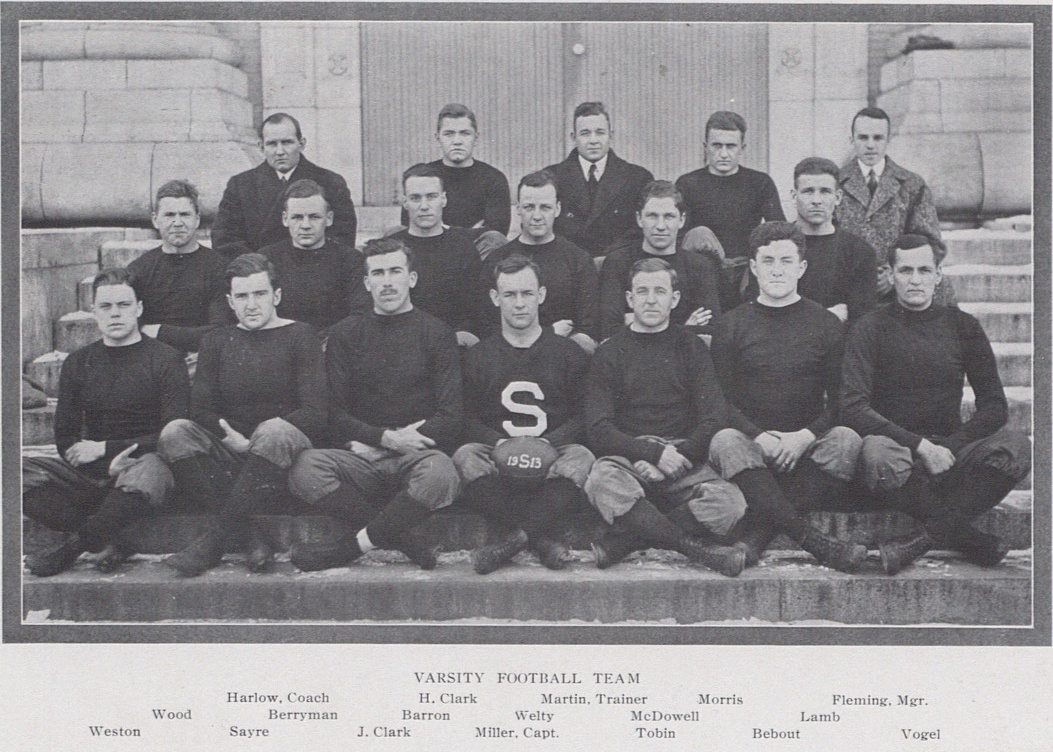
- Conference: Independent
- Record: 2–6
- Head coach: Bill Hollenback (4th season)
- Captain: Shorty Miller
- Home stadium: New Beaver Field

1913 Eastern college football independents records
	Conf.			Overall
Team	W	L	T	W		L		T
Harvard		–		9	–	0	–	0
Carlisle		–		10	–	1	–	1
Washington & Jefferson		–		10	–	0	–	1
Army		–		8	–	1	–	0
Dartmouth		–		7	–	1	–	0
Tufts		–		7	–	1	–	0
Colgate		–		6	–	1	–	1
Franklin & Marshall		–		6	–	2	–	0
Pittsburgh		–		6	–	2	–	1
Princeton		–		5	–	2	–	1
Yale		–		5	–	2	–	3
Rutgers		–		6	–	3	–	0
Penn		–		6	–	3	–	1
Villanova		–		4	–	2	–	1
Lehigh		–		5	–	3	–	0
Bucknell		–		6	–	4	–	0
Cornell		–		5	–	4	–	1
Boston College		–		4	–	3	–	1
Syracuse		–		6	–	4	–	0
Fordham		–		3	–	3	–	2
Geneva		–		4	–	4	–	0
Lafayette		–		4	–	5	–	1
Brown		–		4	–	5	–	0
Duquesne		–		3	–	5	–	1
Carnegie Tech		–		2	–	4	–	1
Holy Cross		–		3	–	6	–	0
New Hampshire		–		2	–	4	–	0
Temple		–		1	–	3	–	2
Penn State		–		2	–	6	–	0
Rhode Island State		–		2	–	6	–	0
Vermont		–		1	–	5	–	0
NYU		–		0	–	8	–	0

The 1913 Penn State Nittany Lions football team represented the Pennsylvania State University as an independent during the 1913 college football season. The team was coached by Bill Hollenback and played its home games in New Beaver Field in State College, Pennsylvania. Following a 26-game unbeaten streak for Hollenback (not the program, which had losses in 1910), the Nittany Lions closed out the 1913 season with six straight losses.

== Schedule ==
Date	Opponent	Site	Result	Attendance	Source
October 4	Carnegie Tech	New Beaver Field; State College, PA	W 49–0		
October 11	Gettysburg	New Beaver Field; State College, PA	W 16–0		
October 18	at Washington & Jefferson	College Field; Washington, PA	L 0–17	7,000	
October 25	at Harvard	Harvard Stadium; Boston, MA	L 0–29		
November 1	at Penn	Franklin Field; Philadelphia, PA	L 0–17		
November 7	Notre Dame	New Beaver Field; State College, PA (rivalry)	L 7–14		
November 15	at Navy	Worden Field; Annapolis, MD	L 0–10		
November 27	at Pittsburgh	Forbes Field; Pittsburgh, PA (rivalry)	L 6–7	18,000	
