= 1913 NYU Violets football team =

American college football season

1913 NYU Violets football
- Conference: Independent
- Record: 0–8
- Head coach: Jake High (1st season)
- Home stadium: Ohio Field

1913 Eastern college football independents records
	Conf.			Overall
Team	W	L	T	W		L		T
Harvard		–		9	–	0	–	0
Carlisle		–		10	–	1	–	1
Washington & Jefferson		–		10	–	0	–	1
Army		–		8	–	1	–	0
Dartmouth		–		7	–	1	–	0
Tufts		–		7	–	1	–	0
Colgate		–		6	–	1	–	1
Franklin & Marshall		–		6	–	2	–	0
Pittsburgh		–		6	–	2	–	1
Princeton		–		5	–	2	–	1
Yale		–		5	–	2	–	3
Rutgers		–		6	–	3	–	0
Penn		–		6	–	3	–	1
Villanova		–		4	–	2	–	1
Lehigh		–		5	–	3	–	0
Bucknell		–		6	–	4	–	0
Cornell		–		5	–	4	–	1
Boston College		–		4	–	3	–	1
Syracuse		–		6	–	4	–	0
Fordham		–		3	–	3	–	2
Geneva		–		4	–	4	–	0
Lafayette		–		4	–	5	–	1
Brown		–		4	–	5	–	0
Duquesne		–		3	–	5	–	1
Carnegie Tech		–		2	–	4	–	1
Holy Cross		–		3	–	6	–	0
New Hampshire		–		2	–	4	–	0
Temple		–		1	–	3	–	2
Penn State		–		2	–	6	–	0
Rhode Island State		–		2	–	6	–	0
Vermont		–		1	–	5	–	0
NYU		–		0	–	8	–	0

The 1913 NYU Violets football team was an American football team that represented New York University as an independent during the 1913 college football season. In their only year under head coach Jake High, the team compiled a 0–8 record.

== Schedule ==
Date	Opponent	Site	Result	Source
October 4	Muhlenberg	Ohio Field; Bronx, NY	L 0–54	
October 11	Hamilton	Ohio Field; Bronx, NY	L 0–13	
October 18	Springfield Training School	Ohio Field; Bronx, NY	L 0–26	
October 25	at Williams	Williamstown, MA	L 0–23	
November 4	Trinity (CT)	Ohio Field; Bronx, NY	L 0–9	
November 8	at Syracuse	Archbold Stadium; Syracuse, NY	L 0–48	
November 15	Wesleyan	Ohio Field; Bronx, NY	L 0–20	
November 22	at Navy	Worden Field; Annapolis, MD	L 0–48	
