= 1913 Geneva Covenanters football team =

American college football season

1913 Geneva Covenanters football
- Conference: Independent
- Record: 4–4
- Head coach: C. Brainerd Metheny (1st season)
- Home stadium: Geneva Field

1913 Eastern college football independents records
	Conf.			Overall
Team	W	L	T	W		L		T
Harvard		–		9	–	0	–	0
Carlisle		–		10	–	1	–	1
Washington & Jefferson		–		10	–	0	–	1
Army		–		8	–	1	–	0
Dartmouth		–		7	–	1	–	0
Tufts		–		7	–	1	–	0
Colgate		–		6	–	1	–	1
Franklin & Marshall		–		6	–	2	–	0
Pittsburgh		–		6	–	2	–	1
Princeton		–		5	–	2	–	1
Yale		–		5	–	2	–	3
Rutgers		–		6	–	3	–	0
Penn		–		6	–	3	–	1
Villanova		–		4	–	2	–	1
Lehigh		–		5	–	3	–	0
Bucknell		–		6	–	4	–	0
Cornell		–		5	–	4	–	1
Boston College		–		4	–	3	–	1
Syracuse		–		6	–	4	–	0
Fordham		–		3	–	3	–	2
Geneva		–		4	–	4	–	0
Lafayette		–		4	–	5	–	1
Brown		–		4	–	5	–	0
Duquesne		–		3	–	5	–	1
Carnegie Tech		–		2	–	4	–	1
Holy Cross		–		3	–	6	–	0
New Hampshire		–		2	–	4	–	0
Temple		–		1	–	3	–	2
Penn State		–		2	–	6	–	0
Rhode Island State		–		2	–	6	–	0
Vermont		–		1	–	5	–	0
NYU		–		0	–	8	–	0

The 1913 Geneva Covenanters football team was an American football team that represented Geneva College as an independent during the 1913 college football season. Led by first-year head coach C. Brainerd Metheny, the team compiled a record of 4–4.

== Schedule ==
Date	Opponent	Site	Result	Source
October 4	Thiel	Geneva Field; Beaver Falls, PA	W 10–0	
October 11	Slippery Rock	Slippery Rock, PA	L 0–15	
October 18	Carnegie Tech	Beaver Falls, PA	W 28–0	
October 23	Waynesburg	Waynesburg, PA	W 53–0	
November 1	Hiram	Beaver Falls, PA	W 7–0	
November 8	Westminster (PA)	Beaver Falls, PA	L 0–3	
November 15	at Grove City	Grove City, PA	L 6–13	
November 22	at Allegheny	Montgomery Field; Meadville, PA	L 0–38	
