= Otis Guernsey =

American businessman football player

Profile
- Position: Fullback

Personal information
- Born: June 16, 1893; Des Moines, Iowa, U.S.
- Died: March 4, 1975 (aged 81); Edgartown, Massachusetts, U.S.

Career information
- College: Yale (1913–1915)

Otis Guernsey (June 16, 1893 – March 4, 1975) was an American businessman and college football player who was the president of Abercrombie & Fitch and a fullback for the Yale Bulldogs football team.

== Early life ==
Guernsey was born on June 16, 1893, in Des Moines, Iowa to Nathaniel T. Guernsey and Martha (Love) Guernsey. Nathaniel T. Guernsey was a vice president and general counsel for the American Telephone and Telegraph Company. Guernsey's younger brother, Nathaniel T. Guernsey Jr., also played football at Yale and set the record for the men's 60-foot plunge in 1923 as a member of the school's swim team.

== Athletics ==
=== Football ===
Guernsey originally replaced Dave Dunn at Yale, who was injured. Guernsey was called the "star halfback" of Yale football's 1913, 1914 and 1915 teams also was their field goal kicker. Guernsey set a Yale record for the longest field goal kicked at 53 years during an October 13, 1915 game against Princeton. Guernsey was called the "hero" of the 1915 Yale-Princeton game, kicking two field goals from the 55-yard line and the 42-yard mark which helped Yale win 13–7. Guernsey missed time during the 1915 season due to sickness and later dislocated his shoulder during a November 20, 1915 game against Harvard.

Guernsey was often compared to and called a rival of Harvard's Charles Brickley, who also served as the team's kicker.

=== Squash ===
Guernsey took up squash after he graduated from Yale, competing in the Squash National Class B Championship. Guernsey later competed in the National Squash Tennis Association's 1922 Fall Squash Tournament, losing to Charles M. Bull Jr. Guernsey then later helped the Yale Squash Team win the Champions Class League in 1922–23.

== Military service ==
Guernsey was a major in the 315th Field Artillery during World War I. He was also a member of the New York Guard and held the rank of brigadier general during World War II.

== Business career ==
Guernsey worked for the General Chemical Company from 1919 to 1922 and the J. L. Mott Iron Works from 1922 to 1924. He then joined Abercrombie & Fitch, where he was promoted to assistant vice president in 1927. In 1928, Ezra Fitch sold his stake in the company to his brother-in-law, James S. Cobb. Cobb became the company's new president and Guernsey succeeded him as vice president. During the Great Depression, Guernsey negotiated with the firm's creditors, which helped save the company from collapse. Guernsey was president of Abercrombie & Fitch from 1940 until 1961, when he was elected to the new position of chairman.

== Personal life ==
Guernsey married Margaret C. Henderson in 1916. They had three sons, one of whom, Otis Guernsey Jr. (1918–2001), became a well-known writer. The Guernseys divorced and she married Yale professor Lemist Esler in 1956. Guernsey died on March 4, 1975, at his home in Edgartown, Massachusetts.
