= 1913 Bucknell football team =

American college football season

1913 Bucknell football
- Conference: Independent
- Record: 6–4
- Head coach: Byron W. Dickson (4th season)

1913 Eastern college football independents records
	Conf.			Overall
Team	W	L	T	W		L		T
Harvard		–		9	–	0	–	0
Carlisle		–		10	–	1	–	1
Washington & Jefferson		–		10	–	0	–	1
Army		–		8	–	1	–	0
Dartmouth		–		7	–	1	–	0
Tufts		–		7	–	1	–	0
Colgate		–		6	–	1	–	1
Franklin & Marshall		–		6	–	2	–	0
Pittsburgh		–		6	–	2	–	1
Princeton		–		5	–	2	–	1
Yale		–		5	–	2	–	3
Rutgers		–		6	–	3	–	0
Penn		–		6	–	3	–	1
Villanova		–		4	–	2	–	1
Lehigh		–		5	–	3	–	0
Bucknell		–		6	–	4	–	0
Cornell		–		5	–	4	–	1
Boston College		–		4	–	3	–	1
Syracuse		–		6	–	4	–	0
Fordham		–		3	–	3	–	2
Geneva		–		4	–	4	–	0
Lafayette		–		4	–	5	–	1
Brown		–		4	–	5	–	0
Duquesne		–		3	–	5	–	1
Carnegie Tech		–		2	–	4	–	1
Holy Cross		–		3	–	6	–	0
New Hampshire		–		2	–	4	–	0
Temple		–		1	–	3	–	2
Penn State		–		2	–	6	–	0
Rhode Island State		–		2	–	6	–	0
Vermont		–		1	–	5	–	0
NYU		–		0	–	8	–	0

The 1913 Bucknell football team was an American football team that represented Bucknell University as an independent during the 1913 college football season. In its fourth and final season under head coach Byron W. Dickson, the team compiled a 6–4 record.

== Schedule ==
Date	Opponent	Site	Result	Attendance	Source
September 27	Hillman Academy	Lewisburg, PA	W 34–0		
October 4	Lebanon Valley	Lewisburg, PA	W 45–0		
October 11	at Princeton	University Field; Princeton, NJ	L 6–28		
October 18	at Cornell	Percy Field; Ithaca, NY	L 7–10		
October 25	St. Bonaventure	Lewisburg, PA	W 53–6		
November 1	at Pittsburgh	Forbes Field; Pittsburgh, PA	W 9–0		
November 8	at Navy	Worden Field; Annapolis, MD	L 7–70		
November 15	vs. Gettysburg	Harrisburg, PA	W 23–0		
November 23	Muhlenberg	Lewisburg, PA	W 14–6		
November 27	at Washington & Jefferson	Washington, PA	L 0–52		
