= 1913 Duquesne Dukes football team =

American college football season

1913 Duquesne Dukes football
- Conference: Independent
- Record: 3–5–1
- Head coach: Norman "Bill" Budd (1st season)

1913 Eastern college football independents records
	Conf.			Overall
Team	W	L	T	W		L		T
Harvard		–		9	–	0	–	0
Carlisle		–		10	–	1	–	1
Washington & Jefferson		–		10	–	0	–	1
Army		–		8	–	1	–	0
Dartmouth		–		7	–	1	–	0
Tufts		–		7	–	1	–	0
Colgate		–		6	–	1	–	1
Franklin & Marshall		–		6	–	2	–	0
Pittsburgh		–		6	–	2	–	1
Princeton		–		5	–	2	–	1
Yale		–		5	–	2	–	3
Rutgers		–		6	–	3	–	0
Penn		–		6	–	3	–	1
Villanova		–		4	–	2	–	1
Lehigh		–		5	–	3	–	0
Bucknell		–		6	–	4	–	0
Cornell		–		5	–	4	–	1
Boston College		–		4	–	3	–	1
Syracuse		–		6	–	4	–	0
Fordham		–		3	–	3	–	2
Geneva		–		4	–	4	–	0
Lafayette		–		4	–	5	–	1
Brown		–		4	–	5	–	0
Duquesne		–		3	–	5	–	1
Carnegie Tech		–		2	–	4	–	1
Holy Cross		–		3	–	6	–	0
New Hampshire		–		2	–	4	–	0
Temple		–		1	–	3	–	2
Penn State		–		2	–	6	–	0
Rhode Island State		–		2	–	6	–	0
Vermont		–		1	–	5	–	0
NYU		–		0	–	8	–	0

The 1913 Duquesne Dukes football team represented Duquesne University during the 1913 college football season. The head coach was Norman "Bill" Budd, coaching his first season with the Dukes.

== Schedule ==
Date	Opponent	Site	Result
September 27	Tarentum	Pittsburgh, PA	W 34–0
October 4	Indiana Normal	Pittsburgh, PA	L 7–34
October 11	Olympics	Pittsburgh, PA	L 0–14
October 15	at Staats AC	Wheeling, WV	L 0–33
October 25	Saint Francis (PA)	Pittsburgh, PA	W 19–0
November 1	The Kiski School	Pittsburgh, PA	T 0–0
November 8	Bethany (WV)	Pittsburgh, PA	W 21–0
November 15	at Westminster (PA)	New Wilmington, PA	L 0–33
November 27	vs. St. Bonaventure	Oil City, PA	L 0–6
