= 1913 Franklin & Marshall Nevonians football team =

American college football season

1913 Franklin & Marshall Nevonians football
- Conference: Independent
- Record: 6–2
- Head coach: Charles Mayser (1st season)
- Captain: Herbert Schaffner

1913 Eastern college football independents records
	Conf.			Overall
Team	W	L	T	W		L		T
Harvard		–		9	–	0	–	0
Carlisle		–		10	–	1	–	1
Washington & Jefferson		–		10	–	0	–	1
Army		–		8	–	1	–	0
Dartmouth		–		7	–	1	–	0
Tufts		–		7	–	1	–	0
Colgate		–		6	–	1	–	1
Franklin & Marshall		–		6	–	2	–	0
Pittsburgh		–		6	–	2	–	1
Princeton		–		5	–	2	–	1
Yale		–		5	–	2	–	3
Rutgers		–		6	–	3	–	0
Penn		–		6	–	3	–	1
Villanova		–		4	–	2	–	1
Lehigh		–		5	–	3	–	0
Bucknell		–		6	–	4	–	0
Cornell		–		5	–	4	–	1
Boston College		–		4	–	3	–	1
Syracuse		–		6	–	4	–	0
Fordham		–		3	–	3	–	2
Geneva		–		4	–	4	–	0
Lafayette		–		4	–	5	–	1
Brown		–		4	–	5	–	0
Duquesne		–		3	–	5	–	1
Carnegie Tech		–		2	–	4	–	1
Holy Cross		–		3	–	6	–	0
New Hampshire		–		2	–	4	–	0
Temple		–		1	–	3	–	2
Penn State		–		2	–	6	–	0
Rhode Island State		–		2	–	6	–	0
Vermont		–		1	–	5	–	0
NYU		–		0	–	8	–	0

The 1913 Franklin & Marshall Nevonians football team was an American football team that represented Franklin & Marshall College during the 1913 college football season. The team compiled a 6–2 record and outscored opponents by a total of 208 to 54.

Charles Mayser, a successful preparatory coach, was hired as the school's head coach in 1913. Upon arriving, he promised: "I am going to put the F. and M. on the athletic map in letters big and bold."

== Schedule ==
Date	Opponent	Site	Result	Attendance	Source
September 27	USS Connecticut	Lancaster, PA	W 69–0	1,500	
October 1	at Penn	Franklin Field; Philadelphia, PA	L 6–13		
October 18	St. John's (MD)	Lancaster, PA	W 47–0		
October 25	at Dickinson	Carlisle, PA (rivalry)	W 6–3		
November 1	Haverford	Lancaster, PA	W 27–6		
November 8	at Muhlenberg	Allentown, PA	L 0–25		
November 15	Lebanon Valley	Lancaster, PA	W 13–0		
November 27	Gettysburg	Lancaster, PA (rivalry)	W 40–7		
