= 1913 Rhode Island State football team =

American college football season

1913 Rhode Island State football
- Conference: Independent
- Record: 2–6
- Head coach: George Cobb (4th season)

1913 Eastern college football independents records
	Conf.			Overall
Team	W	L	T	W		L		T
Harvard		–		9	–	0	–	0
Carlisle		–		10	–	1	–	1
Washington & Jefferson		–		10	–	0	–	1
Army		–		8	–	1	–	0
Dartmouth		–		7	–	1	–	0
Tufts		–		7	–	1	–	0
Colgate		–		6	–	1	–	1
Franklin & Marshall		–		6	–	2	–	0
Pittsburgh		–		6	–	2	–	1
Princeton		–		5	–	2	–	1
Yale		–		5	–	2	–	3
Rutgers		–		6	–	3	–	0
Penn		–		6	–	3	–	1
Villanova		–		4	–	2	–	1
Lehigh		–		5	–	3	–	0
Bucknell		–		6	–	4	–	0
Cornell		–		5	–	4	–	1
Boston College		–		4	–	3	–	1
Syracuse		–		6	–	4	–	0
Fordham		–		3	–	3	–	2
Geneva		–		4	–	4	–	0
Lafayette		–		4	–	5	–	1
Brown		–		4	–	5	–	0
Duquesne		–		3	–	5	–	1
Carnegie Tech		–		2	–	4	–	1
Holy Cross		–		3	–	6	–	0
New Hampshire		–		2	–	4	–	0
Temple		–		1	–	3	–	2
Penn State		–		2	–	6	–	0
Rhode Island State		–		2	–	6	–	0
Vermont		–		1	–	5	–	0
NYU		–		0	–	8	–	0

The 1913 Rhode Island State football team was an American football team that represented Rhode Island State College (later renamed the University of Rhode Island) as an independent during the 1913 college football season. In its fourth non-consecutive year under head coach George Cobb, the team compiled a 2–6 record.

== Schedule ==
Date	Opponent	Site	Result	Attendance	Source
September 27	at Amherst	Amherst, MA	L 0–10		
October 4	at Brown	Andrews Field; Providence, RI (rivalry)	L 0–19		
October 11	at Maine	Orono, ME	L 0–44		
October 18	at Colby	Waterville, ME	L 6–10		
October 25	Fort Adams	Kingston, RI	W 13–0		
November 1	at New Hampshire	Durham, NH	L 0–12	400	
November 8	Rogers High School	Kingston, RI	W 19–0		
November 15	Boston College	Kingston, RI	L 0–27		
