= 1913 Carlisle Indians football team =

American college football season

1913 Carlisle Indians football
- Conference: Independent
- Record: 10–1–1
- Head coach: Pop Warner (12th season)
- Captain: Gus Welch
- Home stadium: Indian Field

1913 Eastern college football independents records
	Conf.			Overall
Team	W	L	T	W		L		T
Harvard		–		9	–	0	–	0
Carlisle		–		10	–	1	–	1
Washington & Jefferson		–		10	–	0	–	1
Army		–		8	–	1	–	0
Dartmouth		–		7	–	1	–	0
Tufts		–		7	–	1	–	0
Colgate		–		6	–	1	–	1
Franklin & Marshall		–		6	–	2	–	0
Pittsburgh		–		6	–	2	–	1
Princeton		–		5	–	2	–	1
Yale		–		5	–	2	–	3
Rutgers		–		6	–	3	–	0
Penn		–		6	–	3	–	1
Villanova		–		4	–	2	–	1
Lehigh		–		5	–	3	–	0
Bucknell		–		6	–	4	–	0
Cornell		–		5	–	4	–	1
Boston College		–		4	–	3	–	1
Syracuse		–		6	–	4	–	0
Fordham		–		3	–	3	–	2
Geneva		–		4	–	4	–	0
Lafayette		–		4	–	5	–	1
Brown		–		4	–	5	–	0
Duquesne		–		3	–	5	–	1
Carnegie Tech		–		2	–	4	–	1
Holy Cross		–		3	–	6	–	0
New Hampshire		–		2	–	4	–	0
Temple		–		1	–	3	–	2
Penn State		–		2	–	6	–	0
Rhode Island State		–		2	–	6	–	0
Vermont		–		1	–	5	–	0
NYU		–		0	–	8	–	0

The 1913 Carlisle Indians football team represented the Carlisle Indian Industrial School as an independent during the 1913 college football season. Led by 12th-year head coach Pop Warner, the Indians compiled a record of 10–1–1 and outscored opponents 296 to 53. The victory over Dartmouth was a great upset.

== Schedule ==
Date	Opponent	Site	Result	Attendance	Source
September 20	Albright	Indian Field; Carlisle, PA	W 26–0		
September 24	Lebanon Valley	Indian Field; Carlisle, PA	W 26–0		
September 27	West Virginia Wesleyan	Indian Field; Carlisle, PA	W 25–0		
October 4	at Lehigh	Taylor Field; Bethlehem, PA	W 21–7		
October 11	at Cornell	Percy Field; Ithaca, NY	W 7–0		
October 18	at Pittsburgh	Forbes Field; Pittsburgh, PA	L 6–12	6,000–10,000	
October 25	at Penn	Franklin Field; Philadelphia, PA	T 7–7		
November 1	at Georgetown	Georgetown Field; Washington, DC	W 34–0		
November 8	at Johns Hopkins	Homewood Field; Baltimore, MD	W 61–0		
November 15	vs. Dartmouth	Polo Grounds; New York, NY	W 35–10		
November 22	at Syracuse	Archbold Stadium; Syracuse, NY	W 35–27	5,000	
November 27	at Brown	Andrews Field; Providence, RI	W 13–0		

== See also ==
- 1913 College Football All-America Team
