= 1913 Army Cadets football team =

American college football season

1913 Army Cadets football
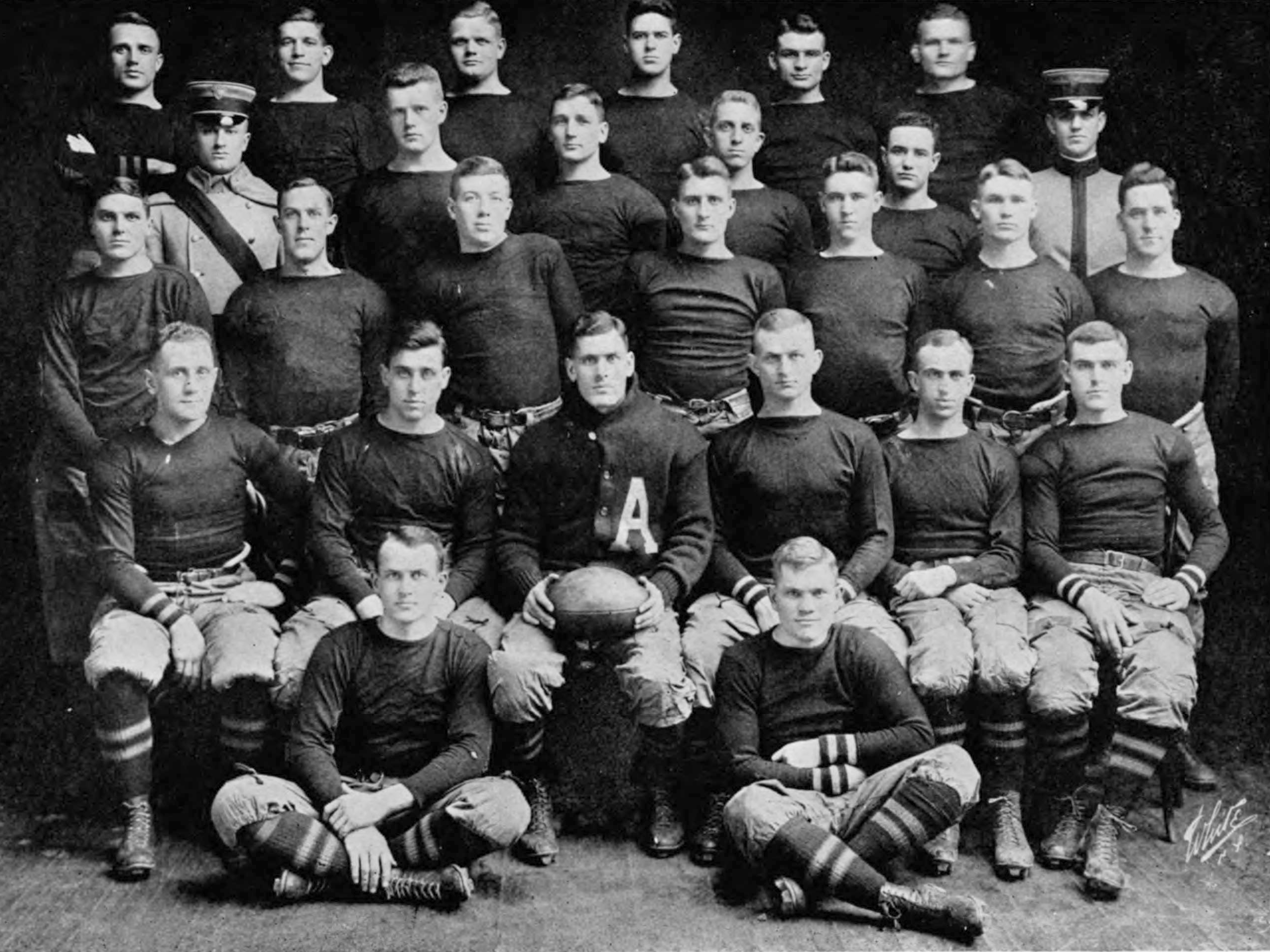
- Conference: Independent
- Record: 8–1
- Head coach: Charles Dudley Daly (1st season)
- Captain: Benjamin Hoge
- Home stadium: The Plain

1913 Eastern college football independents records
	Conf.			Overall
Team	W	L	T	W		L		T
Harvard		–		9	–	0	–	0
Carlisle		–		10	–	1	–	1
Washington & Jefferson		–		10	–	0	–	1
Army		–		8	–	1	–	0
Dartmouth		–		7	–	1	–	0
Tufts		–		7	–	1	–	0
Colgate		–		6	–	1	–	1
Franklin & Marshall		–		6	–	2	–	0
Pittsburgh		–		6	–	2	–	1
Princeton		–		5	–	2	–	1
Yale		–		5	–	2	–	3
Rutgers		–		6	–	3	–	0
Penn		–		6	–	3	–	1
Villanova		–		4	–	2	–	1
Lehigh		–		5	–	3	–	0
Bucknell		–		6	–	4	–	0
Cornell		–		5	–	4	–	1
Boston College		–		4	–	3	–	1
Syracuse		–		6	–	4	–	0
Fordham		–		3	–	3	–	2
Geneva		–		4	–	4	–	0
Lafayette		–		4	–	5	–	1
Brown		–		4	–	5	–	0
Duquesne		–		3	–	5	–	1
Carnegie Tech		–		2	–	4	–	1
Holy Cross		–		3	–	6	–	0
New Hampshire		–		2	–	4	–	0
Temple		–		1	–	3	–	2
Penn State		–		2	–	6	–	0
Rhode Island State		–		2	–	6	–	0
Vermont		–		1	–	5	–	0
NYU		–		0	–	8	–	0

The 1913 Army Cadets football team represented the United States Military Academy as an independent during the 1913 college football season. In their first season under head coach Charles Dudley Daly, the Cadets compiled an 8–1 record, shut out five of their nine opponents, and outscored all opponents by a combined total of 253 to 57, an average of 28.1 points scored and 6.3 points allowed. The Cadets' only loss was against Notre Dame by a 35 to 13 score. In the annual Army–Navy Game at the Polo Grounds in New York City, the Cadets won 22–9.

End Louis A. Merrilat was a consensus first-team player on the All-America team. Tackle Alex Weyand was selected as a second-team All-American by Walter Camp and was later inducted into the College Football Hall of Fame. Quarterback Vernon Prichard was selected as a second-team All-American by Harper's Weekly.

== Schedule ==
Date	Opponent	Site	Result	Source
October 4	Stevens	The Plain; West Point, NY	W 34–0	
October 11	Rutgers	The Plain; West Point, NY	W 29–0	
October 18	Colgate	The Plain; West Point, NY	W 7–6	
October 25	Tufts	The Plain; West Point, NY	W 2–0	
November 1	Notre Dame	The Plain; West Point, NY (rivalry)	L 13–35	
November 8	Albright	The Plain; West Point, NY	W 77–0	
November 15	Villanova	The Plain; West Point, NY	W 55–0	
November 22	Springfield YMCA	The Plain; West Point, NY	W 14–7	
November 29	vs. Navy	Polo Grounds; New York, NY (Army–Navy Game)	W 22–9	
