= 1913 Dartmouth football team =

American college football season

1913 Dartmouth football
- Conference: Independent
- Record: 7–1
- Head coach: Frank Cavanaugh (3rd season)
- Captain: Robert Hogsett
- Home stadium: Alumni Oval

1913 Eastern college football independents records
	Conf.			Overall
Team	W	L	T	W		L		T
Harvard		–		9	–	0	–	0
Carlisle		–		10	–	1	–	1
Washington & Jefferson		–		10	–	0	–	1
Army		–		8	–	1	–	0
Dartmouth		–		7	–	1	–	0
Tufts		–		7	–	1	–	0
Colgate		–		6	–	1	–	1
Franklin & Marshall		–		6	–	2	–	0
Pittsburgh		–		6	–	2	–	1
Princeton		–		5	–	2	–	1
Yale		–		5	–	2	–	3
Rutgers		–		6	–	3	–	0
Penn		–		6	–	3	–	1
Villanova		–		4	–	2	–	1
Lehigh		–		5	–	3	–	0
Bucknell		–		6	–	4	–	0
Cornell		–		5	–	4	–	1
Boston College		–		4	–	3	–	1
Syracuse		–		6	–	4	–	0
Fordham		–		3	–	3	–	2
Geneva		–		4	–	4	–	0
Lafayette		–		4	–	5	–	1
Brown		–		4	–	5	–	0
Duquesne		–		3	–	5	–	1
Carnegie Tech		–		2	–	4	–	1
Holy Cross		–		3	–	6	–	0
New Hampshire		–		2	–	4	–	0
Temple		–		1	–	3	–	2
Penn State		–		2	–	6	–	0
Rhode Island State		–		2	–	6	–	0
Vermont		–		1	–	5	–	0
NYU		–		0	–	8	–	0

The 1913 Dartmouth football team represented Dartmouth College in the 1913 college football season. They finished with a 7–1 record and outscored their opponents 218 to 79. The season marked its third with coach Frank Cavanaugh, who hired Jogger Elcock and Wesley Englehorn as assistants for the year. Englehorn was originally elected as team captain, but was then considered eligible to play. Thus, Robert Hogsett was selected as team captain.

== Schedule ==
Date	Opponent	Site	Result	Attendance	Source
September 27	Massachusetts	Hanover, NH	W 13–3		
October 4	Colby	Alumni Oval; Hanover, NH	W 53–0		
October 11	Vermont	Hanover, NH	W 33–7		
October 18	Williams	Alumni Oval; Hanover, NH	W 48–6	3,500	
October 25	at Princeton	Palmer Stadium; Princeton, NJ	W 6–0		
November 1	at Amherst	Amherst, MA	W 21–7		
November 8	at Penn	Franklin Field; Philadelphia, PA	W 34–21		
November 15	vs. Carlisle	Polo Grounds; New York, NY	L 10–35		
