= 1913 Cornell Big Red football team =

American college football season

1913 Cornell Big Red football
- Conference: Independent
- Record: 5–4–1
- Head coach: Albert Sharpe (2nd season)
- Captain: John Munns
- Home stadium: Percy Field

1913 Eastern college football independents records
	Conf.			Overall
Team	W	L	T	W		L		T
Harvard		–		9	–	0	–	0
Carlisle		–		10	–	1	–	1
Washington & Jefferson		–		10	–	0	–	1
Army		–		8	–	1	–	0
Dartmouth		–		7	–	1	–	0
Tufts		–		7	–	1	–	0
Colgate		–		6	–	1	–	1
Franklin & Marshall		–		6	–	2	–	0
Pittsburgh		–		6	–	2	–	1
Princeton		–		5	–	2	–	1
Yale		–		5	–	2	–	3
Rutgers		–		6	–	3	–	0
Penn		–		6	–	3	–	1
Villanova		–		4	–	2	–	1
Lehigh		–		5	–	3	–	0
Bucknell		–		6	–	4	–	0
Cornell		–		5	–	4	–	1
Boston College		–		4	–	3	–	1
Syracuse		–		6	–	4	–	0
Fordham		–		3	–	3	–	2
Geneva		–		4	–	4	–	0
Lafayette		–		4	–	5	–	1
Brown		–		4	–	5	–	0
Duquesne		–		3	–	5	–	1
Carnegie Tech		–		2	–	4	–	1
Holy Cross		–		3	–	6	–	0
New Hampshire		–		2	–	4	–	0
Temple		–		1	–	3	–	2
Penn State		–		2	–	6	–	0
Rhode Island State		–		2	–	6	–	0
Vermont		–		1	–	5	–	0
NYU		–		0	–	8	–	0

The 1913 Cornell Big Red football team was an American football team that represented Cornell University during the 1913 college football season. In their second season under head coach Albert Sharpe, the Big Red compiled a 5–4–1 record and outscored all opponents by a combined total of 132 to 89. Two Cornell players received honors on Walter Camp's 1913 College Football All-America Team: tackle Jimmie Munns (third team); and end W. H. Fritz (second team).

== Schedule ==
Date	Opponent	Site	Result	Attendance	Source
September 27	Ursinus	Percy Field; Ithaca, NY	W 41–0		
October 1	Colgate	Percy Field; Ithaca, NY (rivalry)	T 0–0		
October 4	Oberlin	Percy Field; Ithaca, NY	W 37–12		
October 11	Carlisle	Percy Field; Ithaca, NY	L 0–7		
October 18	Bucknell	Percy Field; Ithaca, NY	W 10–7		
October 25	Pittsburgh	Percy Field; Ithaca, NY	L 7–20		
November 1	at Harvard	Harvard Stadium; Boston, MA	L 6–23		
November 8	Michigan	Percy Field; Ithaca, NY	L 0–17	6,827	
November 15	Lafayette	Percy Field; Ithaca, NY	W 10–3		
November 27	at Penn	Franklin Field; Philadelphia, PA (rivalry)	W 21–0		
