= 1913 Penn Quakers football team =

American college football season

1913 Penn Quakers football
- Conference: Independent
- Record: 6–3–1
- Head coach: George H. Brooke (1st season)
- Captain: Lou Young
- Home stadium: Franklin Field

1913 Eastern college football independents records
	Conf.			Overall
Team	W	L	T	W		L		T
Harvard		–		9	–	0	–	0
Carlisle		–		10	–	1	–	1
Washington & Jefferson		–		10	–	0	–	1
Army		–		8	–	1	–	0
Dartmouth		–		7	–	1	–	0
Tufts		–		7	–	1	–	0
Colgate		–		6	–	1	–	1
Franklin & Marshall		–		6	–	2	–	0
Pittsburgh		–		6	–	2	–	1
Princeton		–		5	–	2	–	1
Yale		–		5	–	2	–	3
Rutgers		–		6	–	3	–	0
Penn		–		6	–	3	–	1
Villanova		–		4	–	2	–	1
Lehigh		–		5	–	3	–	0
Bucknell		–		6	–	4	–	0
Cornell		–		5	–	4	–	1
Boston College		–		4	–	3	–	1
Syracuse		–		6	–	4	–	0
Fordham		–		3	–	3	–	2
Geneva		–		4	–	4	–	0
Lafayette		–		4	–	5	–	1
Brown		–		4	–	5	–	0
Duquesne		–		3	–	5	–	1
Carnegie Tech		–		2	–	4	–	1
Holy Cross		–		3	–	6	–	0
New Hampshire		–		2	–	4	–	0
Temple		–		1	–	3	–	2
Penn State		–		2	–	6	–	0
Rhode Island State		–		2	–	6	–	0
Vermont		–		1	–	5	–	0
NYU		–		0	–	8	–	0

The 1913 Penn Quakers football team was an American football team that represented the University of Pennsylvania in the 1913 college football season. In their first season under head coach George H. Brooke, the Quakers compiled a 6–3–1 record and outscored opponents by a total of 169 to 81.

== Schedule ==
Date	Opponent	Site	Result	Attendance	Source
September 27	Gettysburg	Franklin Field; Philadelphia, PA	W 53–0		
October 1	Franklin & Marshall	Franklin Field; Philadelphia, PA	W 13–6		
October 4	Lafayette	Franklin Field; Philadelphia, PA	W 10–0		
October 11	Swarthmore	Franklin Field; Philadelphia, PA	W 20–0		
October 18	Brown	Franklin Field; Philadelphia, PA	W 28–0		
October 25	Carlisle	Franklin Field; Philadelphia, PA	T 7–7		
November 1	Penn State	Franklin Field; Philadelphia, PA	W 17–0		
November 8	Dartmouth	Franklin Field; Philadelphia, PA	L 21–34		
November 15	at Michigan	Ferry Field; Ann Arbor, MI	L 0–13	19,687	
November 27	Cornell	Franklin Field; Philadelphia, PA (rivalry)	L 0–21		
