= 1913 Harvard Crimson football team =

American college football season

1913 Harvard Crimson football
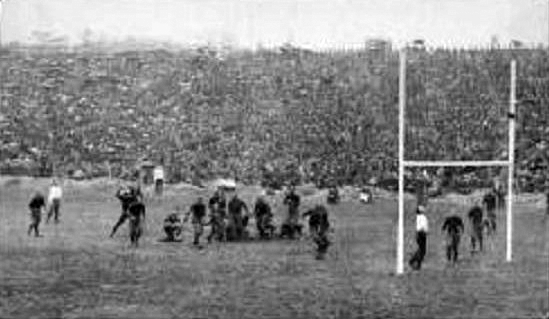

National champion (Helms, Houlgate, NCF) Co-national champion (Davis)
- Conference: Independent
- Record: 9–0
- Head coach: Percy Haughton (6th season)
- Captain: Robert Treat Paine Storer
- Home stadium: Harvard Stadium

1913 Eastern college football independents records
	Conf.			Overall
Team	W	L	T	W		L		T
Harvard		–		9	–	0	–	0
Carlisle		–		10	–	1	–	1
Washington & Jefferson		–		10	–	0	–	1
Army		–		8	–	1	–	0
Dartmouth		–		7	–	1	–	0
Tufts		–		7	–	1	–	0
Colgate		–		6	–	1	–	1
Franklin & Marshall		–		6	–	2	–	0
Pittsburgh		–		6	–	2	–	1
Princeton		–		5	–	2	–	1
Yale		–		5	–	2	–	3
Rutgers		–		6	–	3	–	0
Penn		–		6	–	3	–	1
Villanova		–		4	–	2	–	1
Lehigh		–		5	–	3	–	0
Bucknell		–		6	–	4	–	0
Cornell		–		5	–	4	–	1
Boston College		–		4	–	3	–	1
Syracuse		–		6	–	4	–	0
Fordham		–		3	–	3	–	2
Geneva		–		4	–	4	–	0
Lafayette		–		4	–	5	–	1
Brown		–		4	–	5	–	0
Duquesne		–		3	–	5	–	1
Carnegie Tech		–		2	–	4	–	1
Holy Cross		–		3	–	6	–	0
New Hampshire		–		2	–	4	–	0
Temple		–		1	–	3	–	2
Penn State		–		2	–	6	–	0
Rhode Island State		–		2	–	6	–	0
Vermont		–		1	–	5	–	0
NYU		–		0	–	8	–	0

The 1913 Harvard Crimson football team was an American football team that represented Harvard University as an independent during the 1913 college football season. In its sixth season under head coach Percy Haughton, the Crimson compiled a perfect 9–0 record, shut out five of nine opponents, and outscored all opponents by a total of 225 to 21. The season was part of an unbeaten streak that began in November 1911 and continued until October 1915.

At the end of the season the team was named as the year's champion by The New York Times. Harvard was later retroactively named as national champions by the Helms Athletic Foundation, Houlgate System, and National Championship Foundation, and as a co-national champion with Chicago by Parke H. Davis.

Four Harvard players were consensus first-team selections on the 1913 All-American football team: halfback Eddie Mahan, fullback Charles Brickley, guard Stan Pennock, and tackle Harvey Rexford Hitchcock Jr. Other notable players included ends Huntington Hardwick and Francis Joseph O'Brien and tackle Robert Treat Paine Storer. Mahan, Pennock, and Hardwick were all inducted in the 1950s into the College Football Hall of Fame.

== Schedule ==
Date	Time	Opponent	Site	Result	Attendance	Source
September 27	3:00 p.m.	Maine	Harvard Stadium; Boston, MA	W 34–0	8,000–10,000	
October 4	3:00 p.m.	Bates	Harvard Stadium; Boston, MA	W 14–0		
October 11	3:00 p.m.	Williams	Harvard Stadium; Boston, MA	W 23–3		
October 18		Holy Cross	Harvard Stadium; Boston, MA	W 47–7		
October 25		Penn State	Harvard Stadium; Boston, MA	W 29–0		
November 1	2:00 p.m.	Cornell	Harvard Stadium; Boston, MA	W 23–6	15,000	
November 8		at Princeton	Osborne Field; Princeton, NJ (rivalry)	W 3–0	25,000	
November 15		Brown	Harvard Stadium; Boston, MA	W 37–0	> 25,000	
November 22		Yale	Harvard Stadium; Boston, MA (rivalry)	W 15–5	50,000	

== Roster ==
- Bettle, FB
- Frederick Bradlee, HB
- Charles Brickley, FB
- Coolidge, E
- Cowen, G
- Dana, E
- Joseph Gilman, T
- Huntington Hardwick, HB
- Harvey Rexford Hitchcock Jr., T
- Logan, QB
- Eddie Mahan, HB
- Mills, G
- F. J. O'Brien, E
- Stan Pennock, G
- Ernest William Soucy, C
- Robert Treat Paine Storer, E
- Walter Henry Trumbull, C
- Withington, T
