= 1913 Syracuse Orangemen football team =

American college football season

1913 Syracuse Orangemen football
- Conference: Independent
- Record: 6–4
- Head coach: Frank "Buck" O'Neill (3rd season)
- Captain: Martin Hilfinger
- Home stadium: Archbold Stadium

1913 Eastern college football independents records
	Conf.			Overall
Team	W	L	T	W		L		T
Harvard		–		9	–	0	–	0
Carlisle		–		10	–	1	–	1
Washington & Jefferson		–		10	–	0	–	1
Army		–		8	–	1	–	0
Dartmouth		–		7	–	1	–	0
Tufts		–		7	–	1	–	0
Colgate		–		6	–	1	–	1
Franklin & Marshall		–		6	–	2	–	0
Pittsburgh		–		6	–	2	–	1
Princeton		–		5	–	2	–	1
Yale		–		5	–	2	–	3
Rutgers		–		6	–	3	–	0
Penn		–		6	–	3	–	1
Villanova		–		4	–	2	–	1
Lehigh		–		5	–	3	–	0
Bucknell		–		6	–	4	–	0
Cornell		–		5	–	4	–	1
Boston College		–		4	–	3	–	1
Syracuse		–		6	–	4	–	0
Fordham		–		3	–	3	–	2
Geneva		–		4	–	4	–	0
Lafayette		–		4	–	5	–	1
Brown		–		4	–	5	–	0
Duquesne		–		3	–	5	–	1
Carnegie Tech		–		2	–	4	–	1
Holy Cross		–		3	–	6	–	0
New Hampshire		–		2	–	4	–	0
Temple		–		1	–	3	–	2
Penn State		–		2	–	6	–	0
Rhode Island State		–		2	–	6	–	0
Vermont		–		1	–	5	–	0
NYU		–		0	–	8	–	0

The 1913 Syracuse Orangemen football team represented Syracuse University as an independent during the 1911 college football season. Led by third-year head coach Frank "Buck" O'Neill, who returned after having helmed the team in 1906 and 1907, the Orangemen compiled a record of 6–4. The team played home games at Archbold Stadium in Syracuse, New York.

== Schedule ==
Date	Time	Opponent	Site	Result	Attendance	Source
September 27		Hobart	Archbold Stadium; Syracuse, NY	W 41–0		
October 4		Hamilton	Archbold Stadium; Syracuse, NY	W 18–0		
October 11	3:15 p.m.	at Rochester	Baseball Park; Rochester, NY	W 6–0		
October 18		at Princeton	University Field; Princeton, NJ	L 0–13		
October 25		Western Reserve	Archbold Stadium; Syracuse, NY	W 36–0		
November 1		at Michigan	Ferry Field; Ann Arbor, MI	L 7–43	8,491	
November 8		NYU	Archbold Stadium; Syracuse, NY	W 48–0		
November 15		Colgate	Archbold Stadium; Syracuse, NY (rivalry)	L 13–35		
November 22		Carlisle	Archbold Stadium; Syracuse, NY	L 27–35	5,000	
November 27	2:30 p.m.	at St. Louis	Sportsman's Park; St. Louis, MO	W 75–0	10,000	
