= 1913 Tufts Jumbos football team =

American college football season

1913 Tufts Jumbos football
- Conference: Independent
- Record: 7–1
- Head coach: Charles Whelan (2nd season)

1913 Eastern college football independents records
	Conf.			Overall
Team	W	L	T	W		L		T
Harvard		–		9	–	0	–	0
Carlisle		–		10	–	1	–	1
Washington & Jefferson		–		10	–	0	–	1
Army		–		8	–	1	–	0
Dartmouth		–		7	–	1	–	0
Tufts		–		7	–	1	–	0
Colgate		–		6	–	1	–	1
Franklin & Marshall		–		6	–	2	–	0
Pittsburgh		–		6	–	2	–	1
Princeton		–		5	–	2	–	1
Yale		–		5	–	2	–	3
Rutgers		–		6	–	3	–	0
Penn		–		6	–	3	–	1
Villanova		–		4	–	2	–	1
Lehigh		–		5	–	3	–	0
Bucknell		–		6	–	4	–	0
Cornell		–		5	–	4	–	1
Boston College		–		4	–	3	–	1
Syracuse		–		6	–	4	–	0
Fordham		–		3	–	3	–	2
Geneva		–		4	–	4	–	0
Lafayette		–		4	–	5	–	1
Brown		–		4	–	5	–	0
Duquesne		–		3	–	5	–	1
Carnegie Tech		–		2	–	4	–	1
Holy Cross		–		3	–	6	–	0
New Hampshire		–		2	–	4	–	0
Temple		–		1	–	3	–	2
Penn State		–		2	–	6	–	0
Rhode Island State		–		2	–	6	–	0
Vermont		–		1	–	5	–	0
NYU		–		0	–	8	–	0

The 1913 Tufts Jumbos football team was an American football team that represented Tufts University as an independent during the 1913 college football season. The team compiled a 7–1 record and outscored opponents by a total of 174 to 22. Charles Whelan was the team's head coach.

== Schedule ==
Date	Opponent	Site	Result	Attendance	Source
September 27	Bates	Medford, MA	W 15–7		
October 4	New Hampshire	Medford, MA	W 52–0		
October 11	at Wesleyan	Middletown, CT	W 13–0		
October 18	Maine	Medford, MA	W 19–6		
October 25	at Army	The Plain; West Point, NY	L 0–2		
November 1	Massachusetts A.C.	Somerville High Field	W 14–0		
November 8	Vermont	Medford, MA	W 34–0		
November 15	at Bowdoin	Portland, ME	W 27–7		
