= Yale Field (1884) =

Stadium in New Haven, Connecticut

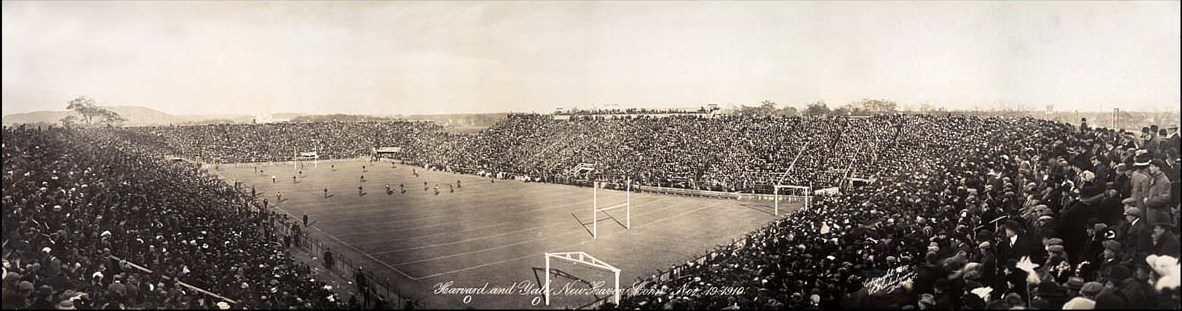
- Location: New Haven, Connecticut
- Owner: Yale University
- Operator: Yale University
- Capacity: 33,000

Construction
- Opened: October 1, 1884
- Closed: 1914

Tenant
- Yale Bulldogs football

Yale Field was a stadium in New Haven, Connecticut. It hosted the Yale University Bulldogs football team until they moved to the Yale Bowl in 1914. The stadium held 33,000 people at its peak. The first game at Yale Field was on October 1, 1884, against Wesleyan University.
