= 1913 college football season =

American college football season

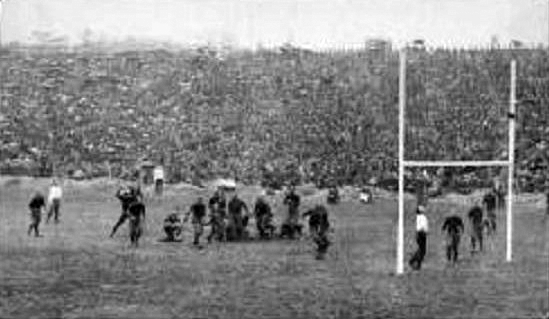
- Harvard defeating Princeton
- Champion(s): Auburn; Chicago; Harvard

The 1913 college football season had no clear-cut champion, with the Official NCAA Division I Football Records Book listing Auburn, Chicago, and Harvard as having been selected national champions. All three teams finished with undefeated records. Chicago and Harvard officially claim national championships for the 1913 season.

Chicago was also the champion of the Western Conference, Missouri was champion of the Missouri Valley Intercollegiate Athletic Association (MVIAA), and Colorado won the Rocky Mountain Athletic Conference.

== Conference and program changes ==
=== Conference changes ===
- One new conference began play in 1913:
  - Inter-Normal Athletic Conference of Wisconsin – active NCAA Division III conference now known as the Wisconsin Intercollegiate Athletic Conference

=== Membership changes ===
School	1912 Conference	1913 Conference
Kansas State Wildcats	Independent	MVIAA
North Texas State Normal football	Program Established	Independent
Ohio State Buckeyes	OAC	Big Nine (Western)
Western Kentucky State Normal Hilltoppers	Program Established	Independent

== Conference standings ==
=== Major conference standings ===
1913 Missouri Valley Conference football standings
	Conf.					Overall
Team	W		L		T	W		L		T
Missouri +	4	–	0	–	0	7	–	1	–	0
Nebraska +	3	–	0	–	0	8	–	0	–	0
Kansas	3	–	2	–	0	5	–	3	–	0
Iowa State	2	–	2	–	0	4	–	4	–	0
Drake	1	–	3	–	0	4	–	3	–	1
Kansas State	0	–	2	–	0	3	–	4	–	1
Washington University	0	–	4	–	0	1	–	5	–	0
+ – Conference co-champions

1913 South Atlantic Intercollegiate Athletic Association football standings
	Conf.					Overall
Team	W		L		T	W		L		T
North Carolina A&M $	2	–	0	–	0	6	–	1	–	0
Washington and Lee	3	–	1	–	0	8	–	1	–	0
Virginia	1	–	1	–	0	7	–	1	–	0
VPI	1	–	1	–	0	7	–	1	–	1
Georgetown	1	–	1	–	0	4	–	4	–	0
Johns Hopkins	0	–	2	–	0	0	–	3	–	0
North Carolina	0	–	3	–	0	5	–	4	–	0
$ – Conference champion

1913 Northwest Conference football standings
	Conf.					Overall
Team	W		L		T	W		L		T
Washington $	4	–	0	–	0	7	–	0	–	0
Oregon Agricultural	3	–	1	–	1	3	–	2	–	3
Idaho	2	–	2	–	0	3	–	3	–	0
Oregon	1	–	1	–	1	3	–	3	–	1
Washington State	1	–	3	–	0	4	–	4	–	0
Whitman	0	–	4	–	0	1	–	4	–	0
$ – Conference champion

1913 Southern Intercollegiate Athletic Association football standings
	Conf.					Overall
Team	W		L		T	W		L		T
Auburn $	8	–	0	–	0	8	–	0	–	0
Mississippi A&M	5	–	1	–	1	6	–	1	–	1
Georgia	3	–	1	–	0	6	–	2	–	0
Vanderbilt	3	–	1	–	0	5	–	3	–	0
Georgia Tech	5	–	2	–	0	7	–	2	–	0
Alabama	4	–	3	–	0	6	–	3	–	0
LSU	1	–	1	–	2	6	–	1	–	2
Sewanee	2	–	2	–	0	4	–	3	–	0
Florida	2	–	2	–	0	4	–	3	–	0
Clemson	2	–	4	–	0	4	–	4	–	0
Mississippi College	1	–	2	–	0	6	–	3	–	0
Tennessee	1	–	3	–	0	6	–	3	–	0
The Citadel	0	–	3	–	1	3	–	4	–	2
Mercer	0	–	4	–	1	2	–	5	–	1
Kentucky	0	–	1	–	0	6	–	2	–	0
Texas A&M	0	–	1	–	1	3	–	4	–	2
Central University	0	–	2	–	0	2	–	5	–	0
Tulane	0	–	4	–	0	3	–	5	–	0
$ – Conference champion

1913 Rocky Mountain Conference football standings
	Conf.					Overall
Team	W		L		T	W		L		T
Colorado $	4	–	0	–	1	5	–	1	–	1
Colorado Mines	5	–	1	–	0	5	–	1	–	0
Colorado College	2	–	2	–	1	5	–	2	–	1
Colorado Agricultural $	2	–	2	–	0	3	–	2	–	0
Utah	1	–	2	–	0	2	–	4	–	1
Denver	1	–	3	–	0	2	–	5	–	0
Wyoming	0	–	5	–	0	0	–	5	–	0
$ – Conference champion

1913 Western Conference football standings
	Conf.					Overall
Team	W		L		T	W		L		T
Chicago $	7	–	0	–	0	7	–	0	–	0
Iowa	2	–	1	–	0	5	–	2	–	0
Minnesota	2	–	1	–	0	5	–	2	–	0
Purdue	2	–	1	–	2	4	–	1	–	2
Illinois	2	–	2	–	1	4	–	2	–	1
Wisconsin	1	–	2	–	1	3	–	3	–	1
Ohio State	1	–	2	–	0	4	–	2	–	1
Indiana	2	–	4	–	0	3	–	4	–	0
Northwestern	0	–	6	–	0	1	–	6	–	0
$ – Conference champion

=== Independents ===
1913 Eastern college football independents records
	Conf.			Overall
Team	W	L	T	W		L		T
Harvard		–		9	–	0	–	0
Carlisle		–		10	–	1	–	1
Washington & Jefferson		–		10	–	0	–	1
Army		–		8	–	1	–	0
Dartmouth		–		7	–	1	–	0
Tufts		–		7	–	1	–	0
Colgate		–		6	–	1	–	1
Franklin & Marshall		–		6	–	2	–	0
Pittsburgh		–		6	–	2	–	1
Princeton		–		5	–	2	–	1
Yale		–		5	–	2	–	3
Rutgers		–		6	–	3	–	0
Penn		–		6	–	3	–	1
Villanova		–		4	–	2	–	1
Lehigh		–		5	–	3	–	0
Bucknell		–		6	–	4	–	0
Cornell		–		5	–	4	–	1
Boston College		–		4	–	3	–	1
Syracuse		–		6	–	4	–	0
Fordham		–		3	–	3	–	2
Geneva		–		4	–	4	–	0
Lafayette		–		4	–	5	–	1
Brown		–		4	–	5	–	0
Duquesne		–		3	–	5	–	1
Carnegie Tech		–		2	–	4	–	1
Holy Cross		–		3	–	6	–	0
New Hampshire		–		2	–	4	–	0
Temple		–		1	–	3	–	2
Penn State		–		2	–	6	–	0
Rhode Island State		–		2	–	6	–	0
Vermont		–		1	–	5	–	0
NYU		–		0	–	8	–	0

1913 Midwestern college football independents records
	Conf.			Overall
Team	W	L	T	W		L		T
Michigan Agricultural		–		7	–	0	–	0
Notre Dame		–		7	–	0	–	0
Western State Normal		–		4	–	0	–	0
Haskell		–		10	–	1	–	0
Michigan		–		6	–	1	–	0
Lake Forest		–		5	–	1	–	1
Doane		–		5	–	1	–	2
St. Mary's (OH)		–		4	–	1	–	1
Christian Brothers (MO)		–		6	–	2	–	1
Wabash		–		5	–	2	–	0
Detroit		–		5	–	3	–	1
Heidelberg		–		4	–	3	–	0
Marquette		–		4	–	3	–	1
Mount Union		–		4	–	3	–	2
Saint Louis		–		5	–	4	–	1
Lincoln (MO)		–		1	–	1	–	0
South Dakota		–		3	–	3	–	0
Northern Illinois State		–		3	–	3	–	3
Akron		–		3	–	4	–	0
Iowa State Teachers		–		2	–	3	–	1
Ohio Northern		–		4	–	6	–	1
Butler		–		2	–	4	–	1
Michigan State Normal		–		2	–	3	–	1
North Dakota Agricultural		–		0	–	2	–	2

1913 Southern college football independents records
	Conf.			Overall
Team	W	L	T	W		L		T
Stetson		–		3	–	0	–	0
Western Kentucky State Normal		–		1	–	0	–	0
Navy		–		7	–	1	–	1
VMI		–		7	–	1	–	2
Louisville		–		5	–	1	–	0
Middle Tennessee State Normal		–		5	–	1	–	1
Arkansas		–		7	–	2	–	0
Oklahoma		–		6	–	2	–	0
Kendall		–		5	–	2	–	0
Sam Houston Normal		–		3	–	1	–	1
TCU		–		5	–	2	–	1
Furman		–		6	–	3	–	0
Maryland		–		6	–	3	–	0
Ole Miss		–		6	–	3	–	1
Presbyterian		–		5	–	3	–	0
Howard (AL)		–		5	–	3	–	1
Richmond		–		5	–	3	–	1
Chattanooga		–		4	–	3	–	0
Oklahoma A&M		–		4	–	3	–	0
South Carolina		–		4	–	3	–	0
Southern College		–		1	–	1	–	0
Polytechnic (TX)		–		2	–	2	–	4
Southwestern Louisiana Industrial		–		4	–	4	–	0
Southwest Texas State		–		4	–	4	–	0
Spring Hill		–		3	–	3	–	0
West Virginia		–		3	–	4	–	2
Louisiana Industrial		–		3	–	4	–	1
Marshall		–		3	–	4	–	0
Delaware		–		2	–	4	–	2
Catholic University		–		1	–	4	–	1
Davidson		–		2	–	5	–	0
Mississippi Normal		–		1	–	5	–	1
West Tennessee State Normal		–		1	–	2	–	0
North Texas State Normal		–		0	–	1	–	0
Birmingham		–		0	–	5	–	0
Wake Forest		–		0	–	8	–	0

1913 Western college football independents records
	Conf.			Overall
Team	W	L	T	W		L		T
New Mexico A&M		–		7	–	0	–	1
Utah Agricultural		–		3	–	3	–	0
New Mexico		–		3	–	2	–	0
Arizona		–		2	–	2	–	0
Montana A&M		–		2	–	2	–	0
Montana		–		2	–	4	–	0
Cheney Normal		–		1	–	5	–	0

=== Minor conferences ===
Conference	Champion(s)	Record
Central Intercollegiate Athletics Association	Hampton Institute	4–0
Inter-Normal Athletic Conference of Wisconsin	Superior Normal; Whitewater Normal	5–0–1
Kansas Collegiate Athletic Conference	Kansas State Agricultural; Washburn College	2–1–1; 2–0–2
Louisiana Intercollegiate Athletic Association	Unknown	—
Michigan Intercollegiate Athletic Association	Olivet	3–1
Ohio Athletic Conference	Oberlin	5–0–1
Southern Intercollegiate Athletic Conference	Fisk (TN)	—
Texas Intercollegiate Athletic Association	Texas	—

=== Minor conference standings ===
1913 Colored Intercollegiate Athletic Association football standings
	Conf.					Overall
Team	W		L		T	W		L		T
Hampton $	4	–	0	–	0	6	–	0	–	0
Howard	2	–	1	–	1	3	–	1	–	1
Lincoln (PA)	0	–	1	–	1	0	–	1	–	1
Virginia Union	0	–	2	–	0	3	–	2	–	0
Shaw	0	–	2	–	0	0	–	3	–	0
$ – Conference champion

1913 Eastern Virginia Intercollegiate Athletic Association football standings
	Conf.					Overall
Team	W		L		T	W		L		T
Richmond $	3	–	0	–	0	5	–	3	–	1
Hampden–Sydney	2	–	1	–	0	3	–	6	–	0
Randolph–Macon	1	–	2	–	0	4	–	4	–	1
William & Mary	0	–	3	–	0	0	–	5	–	1
$ – Conference champion

1913 Illinois Intercollegiate Athletic Conference football standings
	Conf.					Overall
Team	W		L		T	W		L		T
Southern Illinois			–			4	–	3	–	1
Carthage	1	–	2	–	0	3	–	3	–	1

1913 Kansas Collegiate Athletic Conference football standings
	Conf.					Overall
Team	W		L		T	W		L		T
College of Emporia +	5	–	0	–	1	5	–	2	–	1
Southwestern (KS) +	4	–	1	–	1	6	–	1	–	1
Washburn	2	–	0	–	2	3	–	2	–	2
Kansas State	2	–	1	–	1	3	–	4	–	1
Baker	3	–	2	–	0	4	–	4	–	0
Friends	3	–	2	–	0	?	–	?	–	?
Kansas State Normal	4	–	4	–	0	4	–	6	–	0
Cooper	3	–	3	–	0	?	–	?	–	?
Pittsburg Normal	1	–	1	–	1	4	–	2	–	1
St. Mary's (KS)	2	–	3	–	0	3	–	4	–	1
Fairmount	1	–	6	–	0	2	–	6	–	1
Hays Normal	0	–	1	–	0	4	–	2	–	0
Kansas City University	0	–	2	–	0	0	–	3	–	0
Ottawa	0	–	4	–	0	1	–	4	–	0
+ – Conference co-champions

1913 Michigan Intercollegiate Athletic Association football standings
	Conf.					Overall
Team	W		L		T	W		L		T
Olivet $	3	–	1	–	0	4	–	3	–	0
Alma	2	–	1	–	0	3	–	4	–	0
Hillsdale	2	–	1	–	1	2	–	3	–	1
Albion	3	–	2	–	1	3	–	3	–	1
Adrian	1	–	2	–	0	2	–	4	–	0
Kalamazoo	0	–	4	–	0	2	–	4	–	0
$ – Conference champion

1913 Ohio Athletic Conference football standings
	Conf.					Overall
Team	W		L		T	W		L		T
Oberlin $	5	–	0	–	1	6	–	1	–	1
Ohio State	3	–	0	–	1	4	–	2	–	1
Denison	4	–	1	–	0	5	–	2	–	0
Miami (OH)	4	–	2	–	0	6	–	2	–	0
Cincinnati	4	–	2	–	1	5	–	3	–	1
Western Reserve	3	–	2	–	1	4	–	4	–	1
Case	3	–	3	–	0	4	–	5	–	0
Kenyon	1	–	3	–	1	5	–	3	–	1
Wooster	1	–	3	–	1	2	–	3	–	2
Ohio	1	–	3	–	0	2	–	5	–	1
Ohio Wesleyan	1	–	6	–	0	2	–	7	–	0
Wittenberg	0	–	5	–	0	3	–	7	–	0
$ – Conference champion

1913 Wisconsin Normal Athletic Conference football standings
	Conf.					Overall
Team	W		L		T	W		L		T
Superior Normal +	2	–	0	–	1	5	–	0	–	2
Whitewater Normal +	2	–	0	–	2	5	–	1	–	2
Milwaukee Normal	2	–	1	–	1	3	–	3	–	1
La Crosse Normal	1	–	1	–	1	2	–	2	–	2
Oshkosh Normal	1	–	2	–	0	1	–	5	–	0
Platteville Normal	1	–	2	–	0	4	–	3	–	0
River Falls Normal	0	–	1	–	1	1	–	3	–	1
Stevens Point Normal	0	–	2	–	0	0	–	6	–	0
+ – Conference co-champions

== Awards and honors ==
=== All-Americans ===
The consensus All-America team included:

Position	Name	Height	Weight (lbs.)	Class	Hometown	Team
QB	Ellery Huntington Jr.	5'9"	160	Sr.	Nashville, Tennessee	Colgate
QB	Gus Dorais			Sr.	Chippewa Falls, Wisconsin	Notre Dame
HB	James B. Craig		160	Sr.	Detroit, Michigan	Michigan
HB	Eddie Mahan	5'11"	171	So.	Natick, Massachusetts	Harvard
FB	Charles Brickley	5'10"	181	Jr.	Everett, Massachusetts	Harvard
E	Robert Hogsett	5'6"	156	Sr.	Cleveland, Ohio	Dartmouth
T	Miller Pontius	6'1"	189	Sr.	Circleville, Ohio	Michigan
T	Bud Talbott	6'1"	190	Jr.	Dayton, Ohio	Yale
G	John Brown			Sr.	Canton, Pennsylvania	Navy
G	Ray Keeler			Jr.	Bagley, Wisconsin	Wisconsin
C	Paul Des Jardien	6'5"	190	Jr.	Chicago, Illinois	Chicago
G	Stan Pennock	5'8"	193	Jr.	Syracuse, New York	Harvard
T	Harold Ballin	6'1"	194	Jr.	New York, New York	Princeton
T	Harvey Hitchcock			Sr.	Kingdom of Hawaii	Harvard
E	Louis A. Merrilat			Jr.	Chicago, Illinois	Army

== Statistical leaders ==
- Player scoring most points: Johnny Spiegel, Washington & Jefferson, 127
- Passing yards leader: Gus Dorais, Notre Dame, 510+
- Player scoring most field goals: Charles Brickley, Harvard, 13

== See also ==
- 1913 Southern Intercollegiate Athletic Association football season
