= Louisiana Normal football, 1910–1919 =

American college football seasons

The Louisiana Normal football program, 1910–1919 represented Louisiana State Normal School (now known as Northwestern State University) as an independent (1910–1914) and as a member of the Louisiana Intercollegiate Athletic Association (LIAA) (1915–1917, 1919) during the decade of the 1910s. During this period, Louisiana Normal played their home games on campus at Normal Athletic Park in Natchitoches, Louisiana.

During this time, the Demons were led by two different head coaches and had an overall record for the decade of 33–18–2. From 1910 to 1912, Normal was led by head coach Clarence G. Pool and had an overall record of 12–7–1. H. Lee Prather next served as head coach at Normal, and he led the team to an overall record of 21–11–1.

== 1910 ==
1910 Louisiana Normal football
- Conference: Independent
- Record: 6–1
- Head coach: Clarence G. Pool (1st season)
- Home stadium: Normal Athletic Park

1910 Southern college football independents records
| | Conf. | | | Overall |
| Team | W | L | T | W | | L | | T |
|---|---|---|---|---|---|---|---|---|
| Central University | | – | | 9 | – | 0 | – | 0 |
| Louisiana Industrial | | – | | 7 | – | 0 | – | 0 |
| Stetson | | – | | 3 | – | 0 | – | 0 |
| Navy | | – | | 8 | – | 0 | – | 1 |
| North Carolina A&M | | – | | 4 | – | 0 | – | 2 |
| Spring Hill | | – | | 3 | – | 0 | – | 1 |
| Texas A&M | | – | | 8 | – | 1 | – | 0 |
| Arkansas | | – | | 7 | – | 1 | – | 0 |
| Florida | | – | | 6 | – | 1 | – | 0 |
| Baylor | | – | | 6 | – | 1 | – | 1 |
| Georgetown | | – | | 6 | – | 1 | – | 1 |
| Marshall | | – | | 5 | – | 1 | – | 1 |
| Kentucky State | | – | | 7 | – | 2 | – | 0 |
| Texas | | – | | 6 | – | 2 | – | 0 |
| Virginia | | – | | 6 | – | 2 | – | 0 |
| Southwestern Louisiana Industrial | | – | | 6 | – | 2 | – | 1 |
| Chattanooga | | – | | 5 | – | 2 | – | 1 |
| Kendall | | – | | 2 | – | 1 | – | 1 |
| Maryland | | – | | 4 | – | 3 | – | 1 |
| Oklahoma | | – | | 4 | – | 2 | – | 1 |
| Washington and Lee | | – | | 4 | – | 3 | – | 0 |
| South Carolina | | – | | 4 | – | 4 | – | 0 |
| Birmingham | | – | | 3 | – | 3 | – | 1 |
| VMI | | – | | 3 | – | 3 | – | 1 |
| Davidson | | – | | 3 | – | 4 | – | 2 |
| Oklahoma A&M | | – | | 3 | – | 4 | – | 0 |
| West Virginia | | – | | 2 | – | 4 | – | 1 |
| Catholic University | | – | | 2 | – | 4 | – | 0 |
| North Carolina | | – | | 3 | – | 6 | – | 0 |
| George Washington | | – | | 2 | – | 2 | – | 2 |
| Wake Forest | | – | | 2 | – | 7 | – | 0 |
| Delaware | | – | | 1 | – | 2 | – | 2 |
| Mississippi College | | – | | 0 | – | 4 | – | 0 |
| Southwest Texas State | | – | | 0 | – | 4 | – | 0 |
| Tulane | | – | | 0 | – | 7 | – | 0 |

The 1910 Louisiana Normal football team was an American football team that represented the Louisiana State Normal School (now known as Northwestern State University) as an independent during the 1910 college football season. Led by first-year head coach Clarence G. Pool, the Louisiana Normal compiled an overall record of 6–1.

Schedule

| Date | Opponent | Site | Result | Source |
|---|---|---|---|---|
| October 7 | Natchitoches Athletic Club | Normal Athletic Park; Natchitoches, LA | W 5–0 | |
| October 15 | at Louisiana College | Sportsmans Park; Alexandria, LA | W 5–0 | |
| October 22 | Alumni | Normal Athletic Park; Natchitoches, LA | W 22–0 | |
| October 29 | Winnfield High School | Normal Athletic Park; Natchitoches, LA | W 34–5 | |
| November 5 | Louisiana College | Normal Athletic Park; Natchitoches, LA | W 26–0 | |
| November 19 | Louisiana Industrial | Normal Athletic Park; Natchitoches, LA (rivalry) | L 0–32 | |
| November 24 | Centenary | Normal Athletic Park; Natchitoches, LA | W 28–0 | |

== 1911 ==
1911 Louisiana Normal football
- Conference: Independent
- Record: 2–5
- Head coach: Clarence G. Pool (2nd season)
- Home stadium: Normal Athletic Park

1911 Southern college football independents records
| | Conf. | | | Overall |
| Team | W | L | T | W | | L | | T |
|---|---|---|---|---|---|---|---|---|
| Oklahoma | | – | | 8 | – | 0 | – | 0 |
| Florida | | – | | 5 | – | 0 | – | 1 |
| VMI | | – | | 7 | – | 1 | – | 0 |
| Texas A&M | | – | | 6 | – | 1 | – | 0 |
| Georgetown | | – | | 7 | – | 1 | – | 1 |
| Navy | | – | | 6 | – | 0 | – | 3 |
| North Carolina | | – | | 6 | – | 1 | – | 1 |
| VPI | | – | | 6 | – | 1 | – | 2 |
| Virginia | | – | | 8 | – | 2 | – | 0 |
| Louisiana Industrial | | – | | 4 | – | 1 | – | 1 |
| Marshall | | – | | 4 | – | 1 | – | 1 |
| Arkansas | | – | | 6 | – | 2 | – | 1 |
| Oklahoma A&M | | – | | 5 | – | 2 | – | 0 |
| Texas | | – | | 5 | – | 2 | – | 0 |
| Washington and Lee | | – | | 4 | – | 2 | – | 2 |
| West Virginia | | – | | 6 | – | 3 | – | 0 |
| Davidson | | – | | 5 | – | 3 | – | 0 |
| North Carolina A&M | | – | | 5 | – | 3 | – | 0 |
| Chattanooga | | – | | 3 | – | 2 | – | 0 |
| Catholic University | | – | | 3 | – | 2 | – | 2 |
| Maryland | | – | | 4 | – | 4 | – | 2 |
| Baylor | | – | | 3 | – | 4 | – | 2 |
| Wake Forest | | – | | 3 | – | 5 | – | 0 |
| Delaware | | – | | 2 | – | 5 | – | 2 |
| South Carolina | | – | | 1 | – | 4 | – | 2 |
| Southwestern Louisiana Industrial | | – | | 1 | – | 4 | – | 1 |
| Spring Hill | | – | | 1 | – | 3 | – | 0 |
| Southwest Texas State | | – | | 1 | – | 3 | – | 0 |
| Stetson | | – | | 1 | – | 3 | – | 0 |
| Birmingham | | – | | 0 | – | 6 | – | 1 |
| Middle Tennessee State Normal | | – | | 0 | – | 1 | – | 0 |

The 1911 Louisiana Normal football team was an American football team that represented the Louisiana State Normal School (now known as Northwestern State University) as an independent during the 1911 college football season. Led by second-year head coach Clarence G. Pool, the Louisiana Normal compiled an overall record of 2–5.

Schedule

| Date | Opponent | Site | Result | Source |
|---|---|---|---|---|
| October 7 | Louisiana College | Normal Athletic Park; Natchitoches, LA | L 3–10 | |
| October 14 | at LSU | State Field; Baton Rouge, LA | L 0–46 | |
| October 21 | at Tulane | Tulane Stadium; New Orleans, LA | L 0–45 | |
| November 11 | Monroe City High School | Normal Athletic Park; Natchitoches, LA | W 23–0 | |
| November 18 | Centenary | Normal Athletic Park; Natchitoches, LA | W 22–0 | |
| November 21 | at Louisiana College | Pineville, LA | L 0–1 (forfeit) | |
| November 30 | Southwestern Louisiana Industrial | Normal Athletic Park; Natchitoches, LA | L 6–30 | |

== 1912 ==
1912 Louisiana Normal football
- Conference: Independent
- Record: 4–1–1
- Head coach: Clarence G. Pool (3rd season)
- Home stadium: Normal Athletic Park

1912 Southern college football independents records
| | Conf. | | | Overall |
| Team | W | L | T | W | | L | | T |
|---|---|---|---|---|---|---|---|---|
| Middle Tennessee State Normal | | – | | 1 | – | 0 | – | 0 |
| Texas | | – | | 7 | – | 1 | – | 0 |
| VMI | | – | | 7 | – | 1 | – | 0 |
| Maryland | | – | | 6 | – | 1 | – | 1 |
| Oklahoma A&M | | – | | 5 | – | 2 | – | 0 |
| Stetson | | – | | 5 | – | 2 | – | 0 |
| Livingstone | | – | | 3 | – | 1 | – | 1 |
| Louisville | | – | | 3 | – | 1 | – | 0 |
| Mississippi Normal | | – | | 2 | – | 1 | – | 0 |
| South Carolina | | – | | 5 | – | 2 | – | 1 |
| Navy | | – | | 6 | – | 3 | – | 0 |
| Spring Hill | | – | | 4 | – | 2 | – | 0 |
| West Virginia | | – | | 6 | – | 3 | – | 0 |
| Oklahoma | | – | | 5 | – | 4 | – | 0 |
| Rice | | – | | 3 | – | 2 | – | 0 |
| Chattanooga | | – | | 4 | – | 4 | – | 0 |
| Morris Harvey | | – | | 2 | – | 2 | – | 0 |
| Sam Houston Normal | | – | | 2 | – | 2 | – | 0 |
| Southwest Texas State | | – | | 3 | – | 3 | – | 2 |
| Davidson | | – | | 3 | – | 4 | – | 0 |
| Marshall | | – | | 3 | – | 4 | – | 0 |
| Southwestern Louisiana Industrial | | – | | 3 | – | 4 | – | 0 |
| Tennessee Docs | | – | | 3 | – | 4 | – | 0 |
| Arkansas | | – | | 4 | – | 6 | – | 0 |
| Baylor | | – | | 3 | – | 5 | – | 0 |
| Catholic University | | – | | 3 | – | 5 | – | 0 |
| Louisiana Industrial | | – | | 1 | – | 2 | – | 1 |
| West Tennessee State Normal | | – | | 1 | – | 2 | – | 1 |
| Wake Forest | | – | | 2 | – | 6 | – | 0 |
| Kendall | | – | | 1 | – | 4 | – | 0 |
| Delaware | | – | | 1 | – | 6 | – | 1 |
| Birmingham | | – | | 1 | – | 6 | – | 0 |
| Biddle | | – | | 0 | – | 1 | – | 0 |

The 1912 Louisiana Normal football team was an American football team that represented the Louisiana State Normal School (now known as Northwestern State University) as an independent during the 1912 college football season. Led by third-year head coach Clarence G. Pool, the Louisiana Normal compiled an overall record of 4–1–1.

Schedule

| Date | Opponent | Site | Result | Source |
|---|---|---|---|---|
| October 12 | Winnfield High School | Fairgrounds; Natchitoches, LA | W 45–6 | |
| October 18 | Monroe City High School | Fairgrounds; Natchitoches, LA | W 20–0 | |
| October 26 | at Centenary | Centenary Athletic Park; Shreveport, LA | T 6–6 | |
| October 29 | Picked Team | Normal Athletic Park; Natchitoches, LA | L 0–22 | |
| November 9 | at Louisiana College | Pineville, LA | W 39–6 | |
| November 16 | at Southwestern Louisiana Industrial | Campus Athletic Field; Lafayette, LA | W 13–6 | |

== 1913 ==
1913 Louisiana Normal football
- Conference: Independent
- Record: 3–2
- Head coach: H. Lee Prather (1st season)
- Home stadium: Normal Athletic Park

1913 Southern college football independents records
| | Conf. | | | Overall |
| Team | W | L | T | W | | L | | T |
|---|---|---|---|---|---|---|---|---|
| Stetson | | – | | 3 | – | 0 | – | 0 |
| Western Kentucky State Normal | | – | | 1 | – | 0 | – | 0 |
| Navy | | – | | 7 | – | 1 | – | 1 |
| VMI | | – | | 7 | – | 1 | – | 2 |
| Louisville | | – | | 5 | – | 1 | – | 0 |
| Middle Tennessee State Normal | | – | | 5 | – | 1 | – | 1 |
| Arkansas | | – | | 7 | – | 2 | – | 0 |
| Oklahoma | | – | | 6 | – | 2 | – | 0 |
| Kendall | | – | | 5 | – | 2 | – | 0 |
| Sam Houston Normal | | – | | 3 | – | 1 | – | 1 |
| TCU | | – | | 5 | – | 2 | – | 1 |
| Furman | | – | | 6 | – | 3 | – | 0 |
| Maryland | | – | | 6 | – | 3 | – | 0 |
| Ole Miss | | – | | 6 | – | 3 | – | 1 |
| Presbyterian | | – | | 5 | – | 3 | – | 0 |
| Howard (AL) | | – | | 5 | – | 3 | – | 1 |
| Richmond | | – | | 5 | – | 3 | – | 1 |
| Chattanooga | | – | | 4 | – | 3 | – | 0 |
| Oklahoma A&M | | – | | 4 | – | 3 | – | 0 |
| South Carolina | | – | | 4 | – | 3 | – | 0 |
| Southern College | | – | | 1 | – | 1 | – | 0 |
| Polytechnic (TX) | | – | | 2 | – | 2 | – | 4 |
| Southwestern Louisiana Industrial | | – | | 4 | – | 4 | – | 0 |
| Southwest Texas State | | – | | 4 | – | 4 | – | 0 |
| Spring Hill | | – | | 3 | – | 3 | – | 0 |
| West Virginia | | – | | 3 | – | 4 | – | 2 |
| Louisiana Industrial | | – | | 3 | – | 4 | – | 1 |
| Marshall | | – | | 3 | – | 4 | – | 0 |
| Delaware | | – | | 2 | – | 4 | – | 2 |
| Catholic University | | – | | 1 | – | 4 | – | 1 |
| Davidson | | – | | 2 | – | 5 | – | 0 |
| Mississippi Normal | | – | | 1 | – | 5 | – | 1 |
| West Tennessee State Normal | | – | | 1 | – | 2 | – | 0 |
| North Texas State Normal | | – | | 0 | – | 1 | – | 0 |
| Birmingham | | – | | 0 | – | 5 | – | 0 |
| Wake Forest | | – | | 0 | – | 8 | – | 0 |

The 1913 Louisiana Normal football team was an American football team that represented the Louisiana State Normal School (now known as Northwestern State University) as an independent during the 1913 college football season. Led by first-year head coach H. Lee Prather, the Louisiana Normal compiled an overall record of 3–2.

Schedule

| Date | Opponent | Site | Result | Source |
|---|---|---|---|---|
| October 11 | Monroe City High School | Normal Athletic Park; Natchitoches, LA | W 14–0 | |
| October 18 | Louisiana College | Normal Athletic Park; Natchitoches, LA | W 45–0 | |
| October 25 | Centenary | Normal Athletic Park; Natchitoches, LA | L 7–23 | |
| November 3 | at Louisiana Industrial | Ruston, LA (rivalry) | L 0–40 | |
| November 27 | Southwestern Louisiana Industrial | Normal Athletic Park; Natchitoches, LA | W 26–6 | |

== 1914 ==
1914 Louisiana Normal football
- Conference: Independent
- Record: 4–1–1
- Head coach: H. Lee Prather (2nd season)
- Home stadium: Normal Athletic Park

1914 Southern college football independents records
| | Conf. | | | Overall |
| Team | W | L | T | W | | L | | T |
|---|---|---|---|---|---|---|---|---|
| Texas | | – | | 8 | – | 0 | – | 0 |
| Middle Tennessee State Normal | | – | | 5 | – | 0 | – | 1 |
| Oklahoma | | – | | 9 | – | 1 | – | 1 |
| Delaware | | – | | 7 | – | 1 | – | 1 |
| Davidson | | – | | 5 | – | 1 | – | 1 |
| Birmingham | | – | | 3 | – | 1 | – | 1 |
| Georgia Tech | | – | | 6 | – | 2 | – | 0 |
| Presbyterian | | – | | 4 | – | 1 | – | 1 |
| Oklahoma A&M | | – | | 6 | – | 2 | – | 1 |
| Navy | | – | | 6 | – | 3 | – | 0 |
| Maryland | | – | | 5 | – | 3 | – | 0 |
| Southwestern Louisiana Industrial | | – | | 5 | – | 3 | – | 0 |
| Howard (AL) | | – | | 4 | – | 3 | – | 1 |
| Maryville (TN) | | – | | 6 | – | 4 | – | 0 |
| Sam Houston Normal | | – | | 3 | – | 2 | – | 0 |
| Marshall | | – | | 5 | – | 4 | – | 0 |
| West Virginia | | – | | 5 | – | 4 | – | 0 |
| Rice | | – | | 3 | – | 2 | – | 3 |
| North Texas State Normal | | – | | 3 | – | 3 | – | 0 |
| South Carolina | | – | | 5 | – | 5 | – | 1 |
| VMI | | – | | 4 | – | 4 | – | 0 |
| Mississippi Normal | | – | | 2 | – | 3 | – | 1 |
| Texas Mines | | – | | 2 | – | 3 | – | 0 |
| Western Kentucky State Normal | | – | | 1 | – | 2 | – | 0 |
| Baylor | | – | | 3 | – | 5 | – | 2 |
| West Tennessee State Normal | | – | | 3 | – | 5 | – | 0 |
| Arkansas | | – | | 3 | – | 6 | – | 0 |
| Louisiana Industrial | | – | | 2 | – | 4 | – | 0 |
| Wake Forest | | – | | 3 | – | 6 | – | 0 |
| Furman | | – | | 2 | – | 5 | – | 0 |
| Southwest Texas State | | – | | 2 | – | 6 | – | 0 |
| Stetson | | – | | 1 | – | 4 | – | 0 |
| Louisville | | – | | 1 | – | 7 | – | 0 |
| Catholic University | | – | | 0 | – | 6 | – | 1 |

The 1914 Louisiana Normal football team was an American football team that represented the Louisiana State Normal School (now known as Northwestern State University) as an independent during the 1914 college football season. Led by second-year head coach H. Lee Prather, the Louisiana Normal compiled an overall record of 4–1–1.

Schedule

| Date | Opponent | Site | Result | Source |
|---|---|---|---|---|
| October 10 | at Shreveport High School | Centenary Athletic Park; Shreveport, LA | T 0–0 | |
| October 17 | at Louisiana College | Pineville, LA | W 33–0 | |
| October 30 | Shreveport High School | Normal Athletic Park; Natchitoches, LA | W 28–7 | |
| November 15 | Louisiana College | Normal Athletic Park; Natchitoches, LA | W 85–0 | |
| November 26 | at Southwestern Louisiana Industrial | Campus Athletic Field; Lafayette, LA | L 0–12 | |
| | Monroe City High School | Normal Athletic Park; Natchitoches, LA | W 57–0 | |

== 1915 ==
1915 Louisiana Normal football
- Conference: Louisiana Intercollegiate Athletic Association
- Record: 4–2 (3–2 LIAA)
- Head coach: H. Lee Prather (3rd season)
- Home stadium: Normal Athletic Park

The 1915 Louisiana Normal football team was an American football team that represented the Louisiana State Normal School (now known as Northwestern State University) as a member of the Louisiana Intercollegiate Athletic Association (LIAA) during the 1915 college football season. Led by third-year head coach H. Lee Prather, the Louisiana Normal compiled an overall record of 4–2.

Schedule

| Date | Time | Opponent | Site | Result | Source |
|---|---|---|---|---|---|
| | | Monroe City High School* | Normal Athletic Park; Natchitoches, LA | W 134–0 | |
| October 16 | | at St. Charles College (LA) | Grand Coteau, LA | L 7–25 | |
| October 23 | | at Louisiana College | Pineville, LA | W 52–0 | |
| November 6 | 2:00 p.m. | vs. Louisiana Industrial | State Fair Grounds; Shreveport, LA (rivalry) | L 7–20 | |
| November 14 | | Louisiana College | Normal Athletic Park; Natchitoches, LA | W 70–0 | |
| November 25 | | Southwestern Louisiana Industrial | Normal Athletic Park; Natchitoches, LA | W 14–0 | |
*Non-conference game

== 1916 ==
1916 Louisiana Normal football
- Conference: Louisiana Intercollegiate Athletic Association
- Record: 2–3 (1–3 LIAA)
- Head coach: H. Lee Prather (4th season)
- Home stadium: Normal Athletic Park

The 1916 Louisiana Normal football team was an American football team that represented the Louisiana State Normal School (now known as Northwestern State University) as a member of the Louisiana Intercollegiate Athletic Association (LIAA) during the 1916 college football season. Led by fourth-year head coach H. Lee Prather, the Louisiana Normal compiled an overall record of 2–3.

Schedule

| Date | Opponent | Site | Result | Source |
|---|---|---|---|---|
| October 7 | at St. Charles College (LA) | Grand Coteau, LA | L 6–7 | |
| October 27 | at Louisiana College | Pineville, LA | W 44–0 | |
| November 4 | vs. Louisiana Industrial | State Fair Grounds; Shreveport, LA (rivalry) | L 0–24 | |
| November 18 | at Third District Agricultural* | Magnolia, AR | W 84–0 | |
| November 30 | at Southwestern Louisiana Industrial | Campus Athletic Field; Lafayette, LA | L 0–20 | |
*Non-conference game

== 1917 ==
1917 Louisiana Normal football
- Conference: Louisiana Intercollegiate Athletic Association
- Record: 3–1 (1–1 LIAA)
- Head coach: H. Lee Prather (5th season)
- Home stadium: Normal Athletic Park

The 1917 Louisiana Normal football team was an American football team that represented the Louisiana State Normal School (now known as Northwestern State University) as a member of the Louisiana Intercollegiate Athletic Association (LIAA) during the 1917 college football season. Led by fifth-year head coach H. Lee Prather, the Louisiana Normal compiled an overall record of 3–1.

Schedule

| Date | Opponent | Site | Result | Source |
|---|---|---|---|---|
| September 30 | at Minden High School* | Minden, LA | W 14–0 | |
| November 3 | vs. Louisiana Industrial | State Fair Grounds; Shreveport, LA (rivalry) | W 7–0 | |
| November 29 | Southwestern Louisiana Industrial | Normal Athletic Park; Natchitoches, LA | L 0–34 | |
| | Winnfield High School* | Normal Athletic Park; Natchitoches, LA | W 12–0 | |
*Non-conference game

== 1918 ==
No team was fielded in 1918 due to impacts resulting from World War I.

== 1919 ==
1919 Louisiana Normal football
- Conference: Louisiana Intercollegiate Athletic Association
- Record: 5–2 (3–2 LIAA)
- Head coach: H. Lee Prather (6th season)
- Home stadium: Normal Athletic Park

The 1919 Louisiana Normal football team was an American football team that represented the Louisiana State Normal School (now known as Northwestern State University) as a member of the Louisiana Intercollegiate Athletic Association (LIAA) during the 1919 college football season. Led by sixth-year head coach H. Lee Prather, the Louisiana Normal compiled an overall record of 3–1.

Schedule

| Date | Opponent | Site | Result | Source |
|---|---|---|---|---|
| October 3 | Winnfield High School* | Normal Athletic Park; Natchitoches, LA | W 43–0 | |
| October 11 | at Louisiana College | Pineville, LA | L 0–6 | |
| October 18 | St. Charles College (LA) | Normal Athletic Park; Natchitoches, LA | W 37–0 | |
| October 25 | at Centenary* | State Fair Grounds; Shreveport, LA | W 7–6 | |
| November 8 | at Louisiana Industrial | Ruston, LA (rivalry) | W 27–0 | |
| November 17 | Louisiana College | Normal Athletic Park; Natchitoches, LA | W 24–0 | |
| November 27 | at Southwestern Louisiana Industrial | Girard Field; Lafayette, LA | L 0–13 | |
*Non-conference game
