= 1913–14 Baylor Bears basketball team =

American college basketball season

1913–14 Baylor Bears men's basketball
- Conference: Independent
- Record: 1-8 (1-8 Independent)
- Head coach: Norman Paine

The 1913-14 Baylor Bears basketball team represented the Baylor University during the 1913-14 college men's basketball season.

== Schedule ==
Date time, TV	Opponent	Result	Record	Site city, state
	at Howard Payne	L 15-25	0-1	Brownwood, TX
	at Howard Payne	L 17-28	0-2	Brownwood, TX
	Decatur College	L 11-48	0-3	Waco, TX
	Decatur College	L 9-23	0-4	Waco, TX
	Southwestern	W 29-24	1-4	Waco, TX
	at Texas	L 14-51	1-5	Austin, TX
	Texas	L 19-53	1-6	Waco, TX
	Howard Payne	L 15-26	1-7	Waco, TX
	Howard Payne	L 14-25	1-8	Waco, TX
*Non-conference game. (#) Tournament seedings in parentheses.
