= 1913 Louisiana Industrial football team =

American college football season

1913 Louisiana Industrial football
- Conference: Independent
- Record: 3–4–1
- Head coach: Percy S. Prince (5th season)

1913 Southern college football independents records
	Conf.			Overall
Team	W	L	T	W		L		T
Stetson		–		3	–	0	–	0
Western Kentucky State Normal		–		1	–	0	–	0
Navy		–		7	–	1	–	1
VMI		–		7	–	1	–	2
Louisville		–		5	–	1	–	0
Middle Tennessee State Normal		–		5	–	1	–	1
Arkansas		–		7	–	2	–	0
Oklahoma		–		6	–	2	–	0
Kendall		–		5	–	2	–	0
Sam Houston Normal		–		3	–	1	–	1
TCU		–		5	–	2	–	1
Furman		–		6	–	3	–	0
Maryland		–		6	–	3	–	0
Ole Miss		–		6	–	3	–	1
Presbyterian		–		5	–	3	–	0
Howard (AL)		–		5	–	3	–	1
Richmond		–		5	–	3	–	1
Chattanooga		–		4	–	3	–	0
Oklahoma A&M		–		4	–	3	–	0
South Carolina		–		4	–	3	–	0
Southern College		–		1	–	1	–	0
Polytechnic (TX)		–		2	–	2	–	4
Southwestern Louisiana Industrial		–		4	–	4	–	0
Southwest Texas State		–		4	–	4	–	0
Spring Hill		–		3	–	3	–	0
West Virginia		–		3	–	4	–	2
Louisiana Industrial		–		3	–	4	–	1
Marshall		–		3	–	4	–	0
Delaware		–		2	–	4	–	2
Catholic University		–		1	–	4	–	1
Davidson		–		2	–	5	–	0
Mississippi Normal		–		1	–	5	–	1
West Tennessee State Normal		–		1	–	2	–	0
North Texas State Normal		–		0	–	1	–	0
Birmingham		–		0	–	5	–	0
Wake Forest		–		0	–	8	–	0

The 1913 Louisiana Industrial football team was an American football team that represented the Louisiana Industrial Institute—now known as Louisiana Tech University—as an independent during the 1913 college football season. Led by fifth-year head coach Percy S. Prince, Louisiana Industrial compiled a record of 3–4–1.

== Schedule ==
Date	Time	Opponent	Site	Result	Source
October 4		LSU	Ruston, LA	L 2–20	
October 10		Ouachita Baptist	Ruston, LA	T 0–0	
October 18	3:30 p.m.	at Ouachita Baptist	Williams Field; Arkadelphia, AR	L 0–19	
November 1	3:30 p.m.	at Ole Miss	University Park; Oxford, MS	L 0–26	
November 3		Louisiana Normal	Ruston, LA (rivalry)	W 40–0	
November 8		vs. Louisiana Baptist	State Fair Grounds; Shreveport, LA	W 53–0	
November 14		Mississippi College	Ruston, LA	L 3–7	
November 27	3:00 p.m.	at Centenary	Centenary Park; Shreveport, LA	W 7–0	
All times are in Central time
