= 1913 Southwestern Louisiana Industrial football team =

American college football season

1913 Southwestern Louisiana Industrial football
- Conference: Independent
- Record: 4–4
- Head coach: Clement J. McNaspy (5th season)
- Home stadium: Campus Athletic Field

1913 Southern college football independents records
	Conf.			Overall
Team	W	L	T	W		L		T
Stetson		–		3	–	0	–	0
Western Kentucky State Normal		–		1	–	0	–	0
Navy		–		7	–	1	–	1
VMI		–		7	–	1	–	2
Louisville		–		5	–	1	–	0
Middle Tennessee State Normal		–		5	–	1	–	1
Arkansas		–		7	–	2	–	0
Oklahoma		–		6	–	2	–	0
Kendall		–		5	–	2	–	0
Sam Houston Normal		–		3	–	1	–	1
TCU		–		5	–	2	–	1
Furman		–		6	–	3	–	0
Maryland		–		6	–	3	–	0
Ole Miss		–		6	–	3	–	1
Presbyterian		–		5	–	3	–	0
Howard (AL)		–		5	–	3	–	1
Richmond		–		5	–	3	–	1
Chattanooga		–		4	–	3	–	0
Oklahoma A&M		–		4	–	3	–	0
South Carolina		–		4	–	3	–	0
Southern College		–		1	–	1	–	0
Polytechnic (TX)		–		2	–	2	–	4
Southwestern Louisiana Industrial		–		4	–	4	–	0
Southwest Texas State		–		4	–	4	–	0
Spring Hill		–		3	–	3	–	0
West Virginia		–		3	–	4	–	2
Louisiana Industrial		–		3	–	4	–	1
Marshall		–		3	–	4	–	0
Delaware		–		2	–	4	–	2
Catholic University		–		1	–	4	–	1
Davidson		–		2	–	5	–	0
Mississippi Normal		–		1	–	5	–	1
West Tennessee State Normal		–		1	–	2	–	0
North Texas State Normal		–		0	–	1	–	0
Birmingham		–		0	–	5	–	0
Wake Forest		–		0	–	8	–	0

The 1913 Southwestern Louisiana Industrial football team was an American football team that represented the Southwestern Louisiana Industrial Institute (now known as the University of Louisiana at Lafayette) as an independent during the 1913 college football season. In their fifth year under head coach Clement J. McNaspy, the team compiled a 4–4 record.

== Schedule ==
Date	Opponent	Site	Result	Source
October 4	Lake Charles High School	Campus Athletic Field; Lafayette, LA	W 22–0	
October 11	LSU	Campus Athletic Field; Lafayette, LA	L 0–26	
October 25	at Louisiana College	Pineville, LA	W 13–6	
November 1	Loyola (LA)	Campus Athletic Field; Lafayette, LA	W 42–0	
November 8	Jefferson College	Campus Athletic Field; Lafayette, LA	L 3–32	
November 27	at Louisiana Normal	Normal Athletic Park; Natchitoches, LA	L 6–26	
	New Iberia High School	Campus Athletic Field; Lafayette, LA	W 55–7	
	at Jefferson College	Convent, LA	L 0–59	
