= 1913 Oklahoma Sooners football team =

American college football season

1913 Oklahoma Sooners football
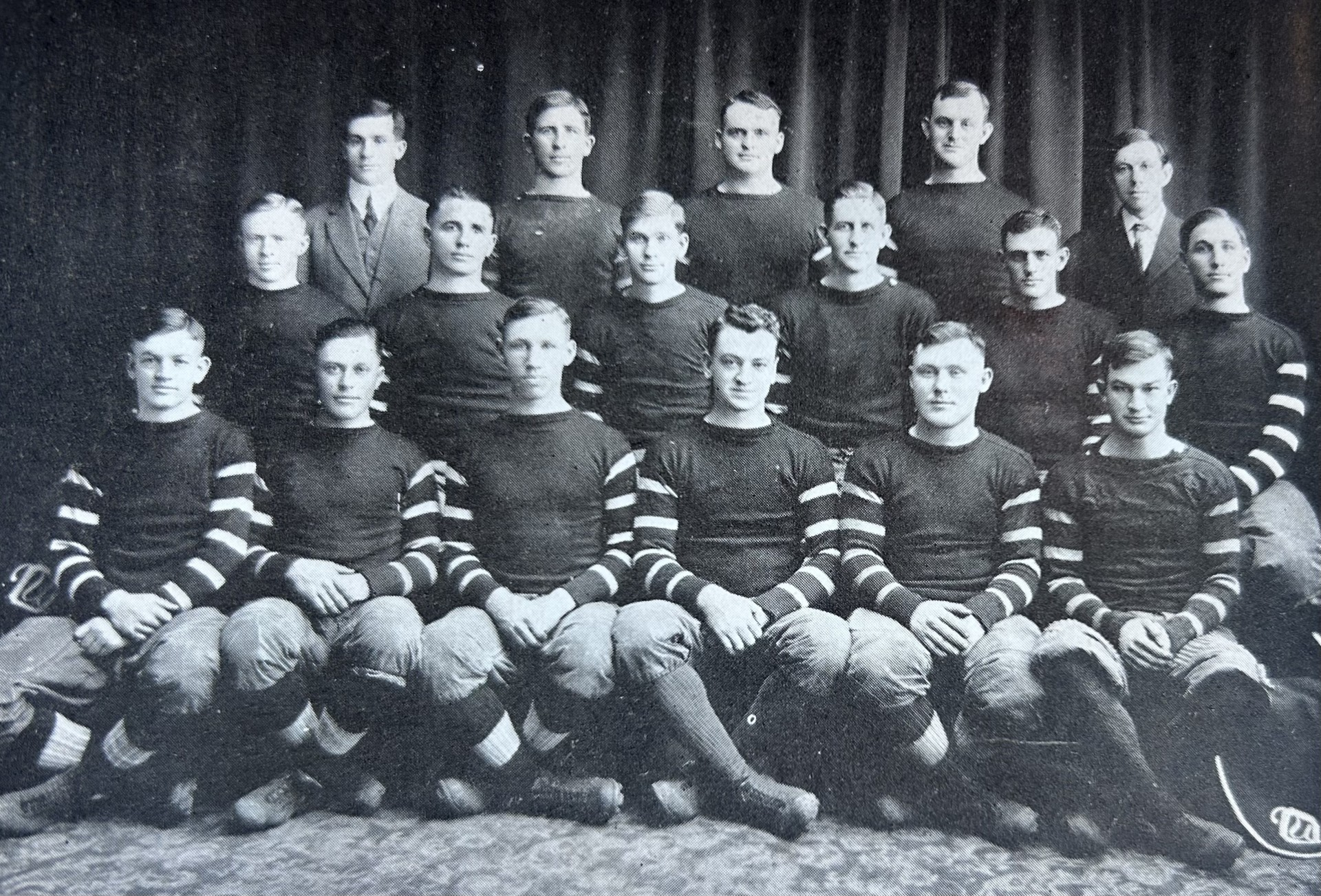
- Conference: Independent
- Record: 6–2
- Head coach: Bennie Owen (9th season)
- Captain: Hubert Ambrister
- Home stadium: Boyd Field

1913 Southern college football independents records
	Conf.			Overall
Team	W	L	T	W		L		T
Stetson		–		3	–	0	–	0
Western Kentucky State Normal		–		1	–	0	–	0
Navy		–		7	–	1	–	1
VMI		–		7	–	1	–	2
Louisville		–		5	–	1	–	0
Middle Tennessee State Normal		–		5	–	1	–	1
Arkansas		–		7	–	2	–	0
Oklahoma		–		6	–	2	–	0
Kendall		–		5	–	2	–	0
Sam Houston Normal		–		3	–	1	–	1
TCU		–		5	–	2	–	1
Furman		–		6	–	3	–	0
Maryland		–		6	–	3	–	0
Ole Miss		–		6	–	3	–	1
Presbyterian		–		5	–	3	–	0
Howard (AL)		–		5	–	3	–	1
Richmond		–		5	–	3	–	1
Chattanooga		–		4	–	3	–	0
Oklahoma A&M		–		4	–	3	–	0
South Carolina		–		4	–	3	–	0
Southern College		–		1	–	1	–	0
Polytechnic (TX)		–		2	–	2	–	4
Southwestern Louisiana Industrial		–		4	–	4	–	0
Southwest Texas State		–		4	–	4	–	0
Spring Hill		–		3	–	3	–	0
West Virginia		–		3	–	4	–	2
Louisiana Industrial		–		3	–	4	–	1
Marshall		–		3	–	4	–	0
Delaware		–		2	–	4	–	2
Catholic University		–		1	–	4	–	1
Davidson		–		2	–	5	–	0
Mississippi Normal		–		1	–	5	–	1
West Tennessee State Normal		–		1	–	2	–	0
North Texas State Normal		–		0	–	1	–	0
Birmingham		–		0	–	5	–	0
Wake Forest		–		0	–	8	–	0

The 1913 Oklahoma Sooners football team represented the University of Oklahoma as an independent during the 1913 college football season. In their eighth year under head coach Bennie Owen, the Sooners compiled a 6–2 record, and outscored their opponents by a combined total of 323 to 44.

One Sooner was recognized as an All-American: Claude Reeds, the first All-American from the program.

== Schedule ==
Date	Opponent	Site	Result	Attendance	Source
September 27	Kingfisher	Boyd Field; Norman, OK	W 74–0		
October 4	at Central State Normal	Edmond, OK	W 83–0		
October 11	Northwestern Oklahoma State	Boyd Field; Norman, OK	W 101–0		
October 18	at Missouri	Rollins Field; Columbia, MO (rivalry)	L 17–20		
November 1	Kansas	Boyd Field; Norman, OK	W 21–7		
November 10	vs. Texas	West End Park; Houston, TX (rivalry)	L 6–14		
November 21	at Oklahoma A&M	Stillwater, OK (rivalry)	W 7–0	2,000	
November 27	Colorado	Boyd Field; Norman, OK	W 14–3		
