= 1913 Davidson football team =

American college football season

1913 Davidson football
- Conference: Independent
- Record: 2–5
- Head coach: W. T. Cook (2nd season)
- Home stadium: Sprunt Athletic Field

1913 Southern college football independents records
	Conf.			Overall
Team	W	L	T	W		L		T
Stetson		–		3	–	0	–	0
Western Kentucky State Normal		–		1	–	0	–	0
Navy		–		7	–	1	–	1
VMI		–		7	–	1	–	2
Louisville		–		5	–	1	–	0
Middle Tennessee State Normal		–		5	–	1	–	1
Arkansas		–		7	–	2	–	0
Oklahoma		–		6	–	2	–	0
Kendall		–		5	–	2	–	0
Sam Houston Normal		–		3	–	1	–	1
TCU		–		5	–	2	–	1
Furman		–		6	–	3	–	0
Maryland		–		6	–	3	–	0
Ole Miss		–		6	–	3	–	1
Presbyterian		–		5	–	3	–	0
Howard (AL)		–		5	–	3	–	1
Richmond		–		5	–	3	–	1
Chattanooga		–		4	–	3	–	0
Oklahoma A&M		–		4	–	3	–	0
South Carolina		–		4	–	3	–	0
Southern College		–		1	–	1	–	0
Polytechnic (TX)		–		2	–	2	–	4
Southwestern Louisiana Industrial		–		4	–	4	–	0
Southwest Texas State		–		4	–	4	–	0
Spring Hill		–		3	–	3	–	0
West Virginia		–		3	–	4	–	2
Louisiana Industrial		–		3	–	4	–	1
Marshall		–		3	–	4	–	0
Delaware		–		2	–	4	–	2
Catholic University		–		1	–	4	–	1
Davidson		–		2	–	5	–	0
Mississippi Normal		–		1	–	5	–	1
West Tennessee State Normal		–		1	–	2	–	0
North Texas State Normal		–		0	–	1	–	0
Birmingham		–		0	–	5	–	0
Wake Forest		–		0	–	8	–	0

The 1913 Davidson football team was an American football team that represented the Davidson College as an independent during the 1913 college football season. In their second year under head coach W. T. Cook, the team compiled a 2–5 record.

== Schedule ==
Date	Opponent	Site	Result	Source
October 4	at Clemson	Bowman Field; Calhoun, SC	L 3–6	
October 11	vs. North Carolina	Cone Athletic Park (II); Greensboro, NC	L 0–7	
October 18	at North Carolina A&M	Riddick Field; Raleigh, NC	L 6–26	
October 27	at Tennessee	Waite Field; Knoxville, TN	L 0–9	
November 1	Newberry	Sprunt Athletic Field; Davidson, NC	W 32–0	
November 15	South Carolina	Sprunt Athletic Field; Davidson, NC	L 0–10	
November 27	vs. Wake Forest	Wearn Field; Charlotte, NC	W 6–0	
