= 1913 Kendall Orange and Black football team =

American college football season

1913 Kendall Orange and Black football
- Conference: Independent
- Record: 5–2
- Head coach: George "Red" Evans (1st season)
- Home stadium: South Main Park

1913 Southern college football independents records
	Conf.			Overall
Team	W	L	T	W		L		T
Stetson		–		3	–	0	–	0
Western Kentucky State Normal		–		1	–	0	–	0
Navy		–		7	–	1	–	1
VMI		–		7	–	1	–	2
Louisville		–		5	–	1	–	0
Middle Tennessee State Normal		–		5	–	1	–	1
Arkansas		–		7	–	2	–	0
Oklahoma		–		6	–	2	–	0
Kendall		–		5	–	2	–	0
Sam Houston Normal		–		3	–	1	–	1
TCU		–		5	–	2	–	1
Furman		–		6	–	3	–	0
Maryland		–		6	–	3	–	0
Ole Miss		–		6	–	3	–	1
Presbyterian		–		5	–	3	–	0
Howard (AL)		–		5	–	3	–	1
Richmond		–		5	–	3	–	1
Chattanooga		–		4	–	3	–	0
Oklahoma A&M		–		4	–	3	–	0
South Carolina		–		4	–	3	–	0
Southern College		–		1	–	1	–	0
Polytechnic (TX)		–		2	–	2	–	4
Southwestern Louisiana Industrial		–		4	–	4	–	0
Southwest Texas State		–		4	–	4	–	0
Spring Hill		–		3	–	3	–	0
West Virginia		–		3	–	4	–	2
Louisiana Industrial		–		3	–	4	–	1
Marshall		–		3	–	4	–	0
Delaware		–		2	–	4	–	2
Catholic University		–		1	–	4	–	1
Davidson		–		2	–	5	–	0
Mississippi Normal		–		1	–	5	–	1
West Tennessee State Normal		–		1	–	2	–	0
North Texas State Normal		–		0	–	1	–	0
Birmingham		–		0	–	5	–	0
Wake Forest		–		0	–	8	–	0

The 1913 Kendall Orange and Black football team represented Henry Kendall College (later renamed the University of Tulsa) during the 1913 college football season. In its first and only season under head coach George "Red" Evans, the team compiled a 5–2 record, outscored all opponents by a total of 271 to 59, defeated the Euchee Indian School (92–0), Haskell A&M (58–0) and Oklahoma Methodist (18–0), but lost the final two games of the season against Pittsburg Normal (32–25) and Tulsa Central High School (27–7).

== Schedule ==
Date	Opponent	Site	Result
September 27	at Euchee Indians	Sapulpa, OK	W 92–0
October 3	Haskell A&M	Broken Arrow, OK	W 58–0
October 10	Claremore High School	South Main Park; Tulsa, OK	W 43–0
October 24	Northeastern State	South Main Park; Tulsa, OK	W 28–0
October 31	Oklahoma Methodist	Tulsa Fairgrounds; Tulsa, OK	W 18–0
November 14	at Pittsburg Normal	Pittsburg, KS	L 25–32
November 27	Tulsa Central High School	South Main Park; Tulsa, OK	L 7–27
