= 1913 VMI Keydets football team =

American college football season

1913 VMI Keydets football
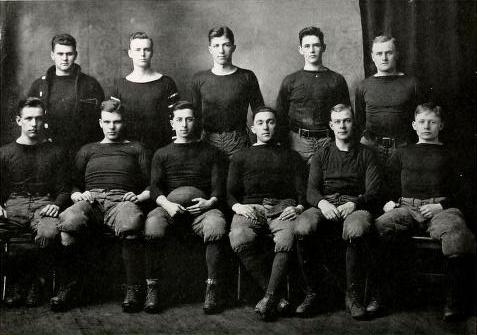
- Conference: Independent
- Record: 7–1–2
- Head coach: Henry Poague (1st season)

1913 Southern college football independents records
	Conf.			Overall
Team	W	L	T	W		L		T
Stetson		–		3	–	0	–	0
Western Kentucky State Normal		–		1	–	0	–	0
Navy		–		7	–	1	–	1
VMI		–		7	–	1	–	2
Louisville		–		5	–	1	–	0
Middle Tennessee State Normal		–		5	–	1	–	1
Arkansas		–		7	–	2	–	0
Oklahoma		–		6	–	2	–	0
Kendall		–		5	–	2	–	0
Sam Houston Normal		–		3	–	1	–	1
TCU		–		5	–	2	–	1
Furman		–		6	–	3	–	0
Maryland		–		6	–	3	–	0
Ole Miss		–		6	–	3	–	1
Presbyterian		–		5	–	3	–	0
Howard (AL)		–		5	–	3	–	1
Richmond		–		5	–	3	–	1
Chattanooga		–		4	–	3	–	0
Oklahoma A&M		–		4	–	3	–	0
South Carolina		–		4	–	3	–	0
Southern College		–		1	–	1	–	0
Polytechnic (TX)		–		2	–	2	–	4
Southwestern Louisiana Industrial		–		4	–	4	–	0
Southwest Texas State		–		4	–	4	–	0
Spring Hill		–		3	–	3	–	0
West Virginia		–		3	–	4	–	2
Louisiana Industrial		–		3	–	4	–	1
Marshall		–		3	–	4	–	0
Delaware		–		2	–	4	–	2
Catholic University		–		1	–	4	–	1
Davidson		–		2	–	5	–	0
Mississippi Normal		–		1	–	5	–	1
West Tennessee State Normal		–		1	–	2	–	0
North Texas State Normal		–		0	–	1	–	0
Birmingham		–		0	–	5	–	0
Wake Forest		–		0	–	8	–	0

The 1913 VMI Keydets football team represented the Virginia Military Institute (VMI) in their 23rd season of organized football. The Keydets had a 7–1–2 record under head coach Henry Poague.

== Schedule ==
Date	Time	Opponent	Site	Result	Attendance	Source
September 27		Hampden–Sydney	VMI Parade Ground; Lexington, VA	W 9–0		
October 4		William & Mary	VMI Parade Ground; Lexington, VA (rivalry)	W 33–3		
October 8		Ole Miss	VMI Parade Ground; Lexington, VA	W 14–0		
October 18		at Virginia	Lambeth Field; Charlottesville, VA	L 7–38		
October 25		Baltimore City College	VMI Parade Ground; Lexington, VA	W 30–0		
November 1		Morris Harvey	VMI Parade Ground; Lexington, VA	T 0–0		
November 8		vs. North Carolina A&M	Broad Street Park; Richmond, VA	W 14–7	3,000	
November 15		St. John's (MD)	VMI Parade Ground; Lexington, VA	W 67–0		
November 22		Roanoke	VMI Parade Ground; Lexington, VA	W 17–0		
November 27	3:00 p.m.	vs. VPI	Roanoke Fair Grounds; Roanoke, VA (rivalry)	T 6–6		
All times are in Eastern time
