= 1913 Arkansas Razorbacks football team =

American college football season

1913 Arkansas Razorbacks football
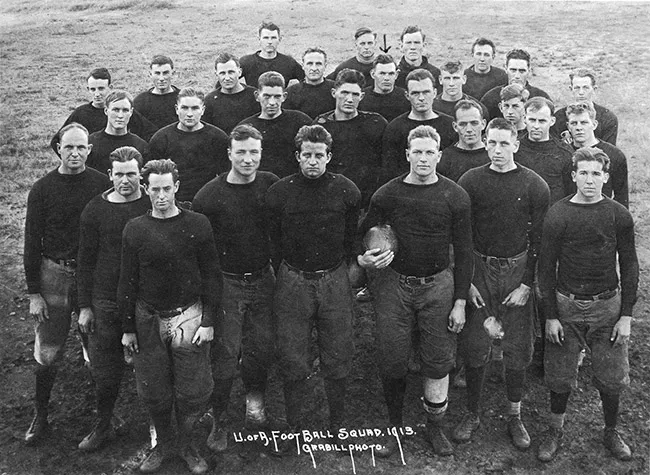
- 1913 Arkansas Razorbacks team photo
- Conference: Independent
- Record: 7–2
- Head coach: Earle T. Pickering (1st season)
- Captain: Russell May
- Home stadium: The Hill

1913 Southern college football independents records
	Conf.			Overall
Team	W	L	T	W		L		T
Stetson		–		3	–	0	–	0
Western Kentucky State Normal		–		1	–	0	–	0
Navy		–		7	–	1	–	1
VMI		–		7	–	1	–	2
Louisville		–		5	–	1	–	0
Middle Tennessee State Normal		–		5	–	1	–	1
Arkansas		–		7	–	2	–	0
Oklahoma		–		6	–	2	–	0
Kendall		–		5	–	2	–	0
Sam Houston Normal		–		3	–	1	–	1
TCU		–		5	–	2	–	1
Furman		–		6	–	3	–	0
Maryland		–		6	–	3	–	0
Ole Miss		–		6	–	3	–	1
Presbyterian		–		5	–	3	–	0
Howard (AL)		–		5	–	3	–	1
Richmond		–		5	–	3	–	1
Chattanooga		–		4	–	3	–	0
Oklahoma A&M		–		4	–	3	–	0
South Carolina		–		4	–	3	–	0
Southern College		–		1	–	1	–	0
Polytechnic (TX)		–		2	–	2	–	4
Southwestern Louisiana Industrial		–		4	–	4	–	0
Southwest Texas State		–		4	–	4	–	0
Spring Hill		–		3	–	3	–	0
West Virginia		–		3	–	4	–	2
Louisiana Industrial		–		3	–	4	–	1
Marshall		–		3	–	4	–	0
Delaware		–		2	–	4	–	2
Catholic University		–		1	–	4	–	1
Davidson		–		2	–	5	–	0
Mississippi Normal		–		1	–	5	–	1
West Tennessee State Normal		–		1	–	2	–	0
North Texas State Normal		–		0	–	1	–	0
Birmingham		–		0	–	5	–	0
Wake Forest		–		0	–	8	–	0

The 1913 Arkansas Razorbacks football team represented the University of Arkansas during the 1913 college football season. In their first year under head coach Earle T. Pickering, the Razorbacks compiled a 7–2 record, shut out five of their nine opponents, and outscored all opponents by a combined total of 137 to 43.

== Schedule ==
Date	Opponent	Site	Result	Attendance	Source
October 3	Henderson-Brown	The Hill; Fayetteville, AR	W 3–0		
October 11	Hendrix	The Hill; Fayetteville, AR	W 26–0		
October 18	Oklahoma A&M	The Hill; Fayetteville, AR	W 3–0		
October 25	Baylor	The Hill; Fayetteville, AR	W 34–0		
November 1	vs. Austin	Fort Smith, AR	W 26–7		
November 8	vs. LSU	State Fair Grounds; Shreveport, LA (rivalry)	L 7–12		
November 15	Ole Miss	West End Park; Little Rock, AR (rivalry)	L 10–21	2,200	
November 17	at Ouachita	Arkadelphia, AR	W 14–3		
November 27	at Tulane	Tulane Stadium; New Orleans, LA	W 14–0		
