= Earle T. Pickering =

American football and baseball coach (1888–1961)

Biographical details
- Born: January 6, 1888; Geneva, Minnesota, U.S.
- Died: June 14, 1961 (aged 73); Hennepin County, Minnesota, U.S.

Playing career

Football
- 1909–1911: Minnesota
- Positions: Fullback, end

Coaching career (HC unless noted)

Football
- 1912: Vermont
- 1913–1914: Arkansas
- 1915: St. Thomas (MN)

Baseball
- 1914–1915: Arkansas

Head coaching record
- Overall: 15–15–1 (football); 33–12 (baseball)

Earle Thomas Pickering (January 6, 1888 – June 14, 1961) was an American football and baseball coach. He served as the head football coach at the University of Vermont in 1912, at the University of Arkansas from 1913 to 1914, and at the College of St. Thomas—now known as the University of St. Thomas—in Minnesota in 1915, compiling career college football coaching record of 15–15–1. Pickering was also the head baseball coach at Arkansas from 1914 to 1915, tallying a mark of 33–12.

Pickering played college football at the University of Minnesota. He was the captain of the 1911 Minnesota Golden Gophers football team. At Minnesota he was a member of Theta Delta Chi.

He was born in Geneva, Minnesota in 1888. He died June 14, 1961, in Hennepin County, Minnesota. He is buried in Geneva, his hometown.

== Head coaching record ==
=== Football ===
Year	Team	Overall	Conference	Standing	Bowl/playoffs
Vermont Green and Gold (Independent) (1912)
1912	Vermont	3–5			
Vermont:		3–5			
Arkansas Razorbacks (Independent) (1913–1914)
1913	Arkansas	7–2			
1914	Arkansas	3–6			
Arkansas:		10–8			
St. Thomas Cadets (Independent) (1915)
1915	St. Thomas	2–2–1			
St. Thomas:		2–2–1			
Total:		15–15–1			
