= 1913 Navy Midshipmen football team =

American college football season

1913 Navy Midshipmen football
- Conference: Independent
- Record: 7–1–1
- Head coach: Douglas Legate Howard (3rd season)
- Captain: K. P. Gilchrist
- Home stadium: Worden Field

1913 Southern college football independents records
	Conf.			Overall
Team	W	L	T	W		L		T
Stetson		–		3	–	0	–	0
Western Kentucky State Normal		–		1	–	0	–	0
Navy		–		7	–	1	–	1
VMI		–		7	–	1	–	2
Louisville		–		5	–	1	–	0
Middle Tennessee State Normal		–		5	–	1	–	1
Arkansas		–		7	–	2	–	0
Oklahoma		–		6	–	2	–	0
Kendall		–		5	–	2	–	0
Sam Houston Normal		–		3	–	1	–	1
TCU		–		5	–	2	–	1
Furman		–		6	–	3	–	0
Maryland		–		6	–	3	–	0
Ole Miss		–		6	–	3	–	1
Presbyterian		–		5	–	3	–	0
Howard (AL)		–		5	–	3	–	1
Richmond		–		5	–	3	–	1
Chattanooga		–		4	–	3	–	0
Oklahoma A&M		–		4	–	3	–	0
South Carolina		–		4	–	3	–	0
Southern College		–		1	–	1	–	0
Polytechnic (TX)		–		2	–	2	–	4
Southwestern Louisiana Industrial		–		4	–	4	–	0
Southwest Texas State		–		4	–	4	–	0
Spring Hill		–		3	–	3	–	0
West Virginia		–		3	–	4	–	2
Louisiana Industrial		–		3	–	4	–	1
Marshall		–		3	–	4	–	0
Delaware		–		2	–	4	–	2
Catholic University		–		1	–	4	–	1
Davidson		–		2	–	5	–	0
Mississippi Normal		–		1	–	5	–	1
West Tennessee State Normal		–		1	–	2	–	0
North Texas State Normal		–		0	–	1	–	0
Birmingham		–		0	–	5	–	0
Wake Forest		–		0	–	8	–	0

The 1913 Navy Midshipmen football team represented the United States Naval Academy during the 1913 college football season. In their third season under head coach Douglas Legate Howard, the team compiled a 7–1–1 record, shut out seven opponents, and defeated its opponents by a combined score of 304 to 29.

The team's sole loss came in the annual Army–Navy Game, played on November 29 at the Polo Grounds in New York City; Army won 22–9.

== Schedule ==
Date	Opponent	Site	Result	Source
October 4	Pittsburgh	Worden Field; Annapolis, MD	T 0–0	
October 11	Georgetown	Worden Field; Annapolis, MD	W 23–0	
October 18	Dickinson	Worden Field; Annapolis, MD	W 29–0	
October 25	Maryland	Worden Field; Annapolis, MD (rivalry)	W 76–0	
November 1	Lehigh	Worden Field; Annapolis, MD	W 39–0	
November 8	Bucknell	Worden Field; Annapolis, MD	W 70–7	
November 15	Penn State	Worden Field; Annapolis, MD	W 10–0	
November 22	NYU	Worden Field; Annapolis, MD	W 48–0	
November 29	vs. Army	Polo Grounds; New York, NY (Army–Navy Game)	L 9–22	
