= 1913 Howard Baptists football team =

American college football season

1913 Howard Baptists football
- Conference: Independent
- Record: 5–3–1
- Head coach: B. L. Noojin (2nd season)
- Home stadium: Howard Athletic Field

1913 Southern college football independents records
| | Conf. | | | Overall |
| Team | W | L | T | W | | L | | T |
|---|---|---|---|---|---|---|---|---|
| Stetson | | – | | 3 | – | 0 | – | 0 |
| Western Kentucky State Normal | | – | | 1 | – | 0 | – | 0 |
| Navy | | – | | 7 | – | 1 | – | 1 |
| VMI | | – | | 7 | – | 1 | – | 2 |
| Louisville | | – | | 5 | – | 1 | – | 0 |
| Middle Tennessee State Normal | | – | | 5 | – | 1 | – | 1 |
| Arkansas | | – | | 7 | – | 2 | – | 0 |
| Oklahoma | | – | | 6 | – | 2 | – | 0 |
| Kendall | | – | | 5 | – | 2 | – | 0 |
| Sam Houston Normal | | – | | 3 | – | 1 | – | 1 |
| TCU | | – | | 5 | – | 2 | – | 1 |
| Furman | | – | | 6 | – | 3 | – | 0 |
| Maryland | | – | | 6 | – | 3 | – | 0 |
| Ole Miss | | – | | 6 | – | 3 | – | 1 |
| Presbyterian | | – | | 5 | – | 3 | – | 0 |
| Howard (AL) | | – | | 5 | – | 3 | – | 1 |
| Richmond | | – | | 5 | – | 3 | – | 1 |
| Chattanooga | | – | | 4 | – | 3 | – | 0 |
| Oklahoma A&M | | – | | 4 | – | 3 | – | 0 |
| South Carolina | | – | | 4 | – | 3 | – | 0 |
| Southern College | | – | | 1 | – | 1 | – | 0 |
| Polytechnic (TX) | | – | | 2 | – | 2 | – | 4 |
| Southwestern Louisiana Industrial | | – | | 4 | – | 4 | – | 0 |
| Southwest Texas State | | – | | 4 | – | 4 | – | 0 |
| Spring Hill | | – | | 3 | – | 3 | – | 0 |
| West Virginia | | – | | 3 | – | 4 | – | 2 |
| Louisiana Industrial | | – | | 3 | – | 4 | – | 1 |
| Marshall | | – | | 3 | – | 4 | – | 0 |
| Delaware | | – | | 2 | – | 4 | – | 2 |
| Catholic University | | – | | 1 | – | 4 | – | 1 |
| Davidson | | – | | 2 | – | 5 | – | 0 |
| Mississippi Normal | | – | | 1 | – | 5 | – | 1 |
| West Tennessee State Normal | | – | | 1 | – | 2 | – | 0 |
| North Texas State Normal | | – | | 0 | – | 1 | – | 0 |
| Birmingham | | – | | 0 | – | 5 | – | 0 |
| Wake Forest | | – | | 0 | – | 8 | – | 0 |

The 1913 Howard Baptists football team was an American football team that represented Howard College (now known as the Samford University) as an independent during the 1913 college football season. In their second year under head coach B. L. Noojin, the team compiled an 5–3–1 record.

== Schedule ==
| Date | Opponent | Site | Result | Attendance | Source |
|---|---|---|---|---|---|
| September 27 | at Alabama | The Quad; Tuscaloosa, AL | L 0–27 | | |
| October 4 | at Mississippi A&M | Hardy Field; Starkville, MS | L 0–66 | | |
| October 10 | Jacksonville State | Howard Athletic Field; Birmingham, AL (rivalry) | T 0–0 | | |
| October 18 | at Seventh District Agricultural School | Marshall County Fairgrounds; Albertville, AL | W 14–3 | 5,000 | |
| October 24 | at Alabama Presbyterian | Anniston, AL | W 12–6 | | |
| November 1 | at State Normal (AL) | Florence, AL | W 25–6 | | |
| November 14 | vs. Birmingham | Rickwood Field; Birmingham, AL | W 31–0 | | |
| November 21 | Ninth District Agricultural School | Howard Athletic Field; Birmingham, AL | W 65–3 | | |
| November 27 | at Mississippi College | Mississippi State Fairgrounds; Jackson, MS | L 6–10 | 2,500 | |
