= Blondie Williams =

American football quarterback

Playing career
- 1909–1912: Mississippi A&M
- Position: Quarterback

Coaching career (HC unless noted)
- 1913: Mississippi Normal

Head coaching record
- Overall: 1–5–1

Accomplishments and honors

Awards
- All-Southern (1911)

W. J. "Blondie" Williams was an American college football player and coach. He was the starting quarterback for Mississippi A&M in 1911. Williams served as the head football coach at Mississippi Normal College —now known as the University of Southern Mississippi—in 1913, compiling a record of 1–5–1.

== Head coaching record ==
| Year | Team | Overall | Conference | Standing | Bowl/playoffs |
|---|---|---|---|---|---|
Mississippi Normal Normalites (Independent) (1913)
| 1913 | Mississippi Normal | 1–5–1 | | | |
| Mississippi Normal: | | 1–5–1 | | | |
| Total: | | 2–1 | | | |
