= 1913 Texas Longhorns football team =

American college football season

1913 Texas Longhorns football

TIAA champion
- Conference: Texas Intercollegiate Athletic Association
- Record: 7–1 (4–0 TIAA)
- Head coach: Dave Allerdice (3rd season)
- Captain: W. C. Brown
- Home stadium: Clark Field

1913 Texas Intercollegiate Athletic Association football standings
	Conf.					Overall
Team	W		L		T	W		L		T
Texas $	4	–	0	–	0	7	–	1	–	0
Rice	2	–	0	–	0	4	–	0	–	0
Texas A&M	3	–	0	–	1	3	–	4	–	2
Austin	3	–	2	–	1	3	–	3	–	1
Polytechnic (TX)	3	–	2	–	4	3	–	2	–	4
Baylor	2	–	2	–	2	4	–	4	–	2
Trinity (TX)	2	–	5	–	1	3	–	5	–	1
Southwestern (TX)	1	–	4	–	2	1	–	5	–	2
Daniel Baker	0	–	3	–	1	1	–	4	–	2
$ – Conference champion

The 1913 Texas Longhorns football team was an American football team that represented the University of Texas (now known as the University of Texas at Austin) as a member of the Texas Intercollegiate Athletic Association (TIAA) during the 1913 college football season. In their third year under head coach Dave Allerdice, the Longhorns compiled an overall record of 7–1 with a mark of 4–0 in conference play, winning the TIAA title.

== Schedule ==
Date	Opponent	Site	Result	Source
October 3	Polytechnic (TX)	Clark Field; Austin, TX	W 14–7	
October 10	Austin	Clark Field; Austin, TX	W 27–6	
October 16	Baylor	Clark Field; Austin, TX (rivalry)	W 77–0	
October 25	vs. Sewanee*	State Fair Stadium; Dallas, TX	W 13–7	
November 3	Southwestern (TX)	Clark Field; Austin, TX	W 52–0	
November 10	vs. Oklahoma*	West End Park; Houston, TX (rivalry)	W 14–6	
November 18	Kansas State*	Clark Field; Austin, TX	W 46–0	
November 27	Notre Dame*	Clark Field; Austin, TX	L 7–29	
*Non-conference game
