= 1913 Presbyterian Blue Hose football team =

American college football season

1913 Presbyterian Blue Hose football
- Conference: Independent
- Record: 5–3
- Head coach: Everett Booe (1st season)
- Captain: D. D. "Red" Thomas

1913 Southern college football independents records
| | Conf. | | | Overall |
| Team | W | L | T | W | | L | | T |
|---|---|---|---|---|---|---|---|---|
| Stetson | | – | | 3 | – | 0 | – | 0 |
| Western Kentucky State Normal | | – | | 1 | – | 0 | – | 0 |
| Navy | | – | | 7 | – | 1 | – | 1 |
| VMI | | – | | 7 | – | 1 | – | 2 |
| Louisville | | – | | 5 | – | 1 | – | 0 |
| Middle Tennessee State Normal | | – | | 5 | – | 1 | – | 1 |
| Arkansas | | – | | 7 | – | 2 | – | 0 |
| Oklahoma | | – | | 6 | – | 2 | – | 0 |
| Kendall | | – | | 5 | – | 2 | – | 0 |
| Sam Houston Normal | | – | | 3 | – | 1 | – | 1 |
| TCU | | – | | 5 | – | 2 | – | 1 |
| Furman | | – | | 6 | – | 3 | – | 0 |
| Maryland | | – | | 6 | – | 3 | – | 0 |
| Ole Miss | | – | | 6 | – | 3 | – | 1 |
| Presbyterian | | – | | 5 | – | 3 | – | 0 |
| Howard (AL) | | – | | 5 | – | 3 | – | 1 |
| Richmond | | – | | 5 | – | 3 | – | 1 |
| Chattanooga | | – | | 4 | – | 3 | – | 0 |
| Oklahoma A&M | | – | | 4 | – | 3 | – | 0 |
| South Carolina | | – | | 4 | – | 3 | – | 0 |
| Southern College | | – | | 1 | – | 1 | – | 0 |
| Polytechnic (TX) | | – | | 2 | – | 2 | – | 4 |
| Southwestern Louisiana Industrial | | – | | 4 | – | 4 | – | 0 |
| Southwest Texas State | | – | | 4 | – | 4 | – | 0 |
| Spring Hill | | – | | 3 | – | 3 | – | 0 |
| West Virginia | | – | | 3 | – | 4 | – | 2 |
| Louisiana Industrial | | – | | 3 | – | 4 | – | 1 |
| Marshall | | – | | 3 | – | 4 | – | 0 |
| Delaware | | – | | 2 | – | 4 | – | 2 |
| Catholic University | | – | | 1 | – | 4 | – | 1 |
| Davidson | | – | | 2 | – | 5 | – | 0 |
| Mississippi Normal | | – | | 1 | – | 5 | – | 1 |
| West Tennessee State Normal | | – | | 1 | – | 2 | – | 0 |
| North Texas State Normal | | – | | 0 | – | 1 | – | 0 |
| Birmingham | | – | | 0 | – | 5 | – | 0 |
| Wake Forest | | – | | 0 | – | 8 | – | 0 |

The 1913 Presbyterian Blue Hose football team represented Presbyterian College as an independent during the 1913 college football season. Led by Everett Booe in his first and only season as head coach, the Blue Hose compiled a record of 5–3. The team captain was D. D. "Red" Thomas.

== Schedule ==
| Date | Opponent | Site | Result | Source |
|---|---|---|---|---|
| October 13 | Anderson Fitting | Clinton, SC | W 58–0 | |
| October 20 | Bailey Military Institute | Clinton, SC | W 20–0 | |
| October 29 | Newberry | | L 0–51 | |
| November 7 | at Newberry | Newberry, SC | L 0–51 | |
| November 14 | Rock Hill High School | | W 32–10 | |
| November 17 | at Bailey Military Institute | | W 26–0 | |
| November 21 | at Furman | Greenville, SC | L 0–65 | |
| November 27 | at College of Charleston | | W 12–6 | |
