= 1913 South Carolina Gamecocks football team =

American college football season

1913 South Carolina Gamecocks football
- Conference: Independent
- Record: 4–3
- Head coach: Norman B. Edgerton (2nd season)
- Captain: John Mills
- Home stadium: Davis Field

1913 Southern college football independents records
	Conf.			Overall
Team	W	L	T	W		L		T
Stetson		–		3	–	0	–	0
Western Kentucky State Normal		–		1	–	0	–	0
Navy		–		7	–	1	–	1
VMI		–		7	–	1	–	2
Louisville		–		5	–	1	–	0
Middle Tennessee State Normal		–		5	–	1	–	1
Arkansas		–		7	–	2	–	0
Oklahoma		–		6	–	2	–	0
Kendall		–		5	–	2	–	0
Sam Houston Normal		–		3	–	1	–	1
TCU		–		5	–	2	–	1
Furman		–		6	–	3	–	0
Maryland		–		6	–	3	–	0
Ole Miss		–		6	–	3	–	1
Presbyterian		–		5	–	3	–	0
Howard (AL)		–		5	–	3	–	1
Richmond		–		5	–	3	–	1
Chattanooga		–		4	–	3	–	0
Oklahoma A&M		–		4	–	3	–	0
South Carolina		–		4	–	3	–	0
Southern College		–		1	–	1	–	0
Polytechnic (TX)		–		2	–	2	–	4
Southwestern Louisiana Industrial		–		4	–	4	–	0
Southwest Texas State		–		4	–	4	–	0
Spring Hill		–		3	–	3	–	0
West Virginia		–		3	–	4	–	2
Louisiana Industrial		–		3	–	4	–	1
Marshall		–		3	–	4	–	0
Delaware		–		2	–	4	–	2
Catholic University		–		1	–	4	–	1
Davidson		–		2	–	5	–	0
Mississippi Normal		–		1	–	5	–	1
West Tennessee State Normal		–		1	–	2	–	0
North Texas State Normal		–		0	–	1	–	0
Birmingham		–		0	–	5	–	0
Wake Forest		–		0	–	8	–	0

The 1913 South Carolina Gamecocks football team represented the University of South Carolina as an independent during the 1913 college football season. Led by second-year head coach Norman B. Edgerton, the Gamecocks compiled a record of 4–3 record.

The Gamecocks employed trick plays to avenged the previous year's loss to Florida, winning 13–0 in a steady rain.

== Schedule ==
Date	Opponent	Site	Result	Source
October 4	at Virginia	Lambeth Field; Charlottesville, VA	L 0–54	
October 11	Wake Forest	Davis Field; Columbia, SC	W 27–10	
October 18	North Carolina	Davis Field; Columbia, SC	L 3–13	
October 30	Clemson	State Fairgrounds; Columbia, SC	L 0–32	
November 8	Florida	Davis Field; Columbia, SC	W 13–0	
November 15	at Davidson	Davidson Athletic Field; Davidson, NC	W 10–0	
November 27	The Citadel	Davis Field; Columbia, SC	W 42–13	
