= 1913 Middle Tennessee State Normal football team =

American college football season

1913 Middle Tennessee State Normal football
- Conference: Independent
- Record: 5–1–1
- Head coach: Alfred B. Miles (1st season)
- Captain: W. B. McKnight
- Home stadium: none

1913 Southern college football independents records
	Conf.			Overall
Team	W	L	T	W		L		T
Stetson		–		3	–	0	–	0
Western Kentucky State Normal		–		1	–	0	–	0
Navy		–		7	–	1	–	1
VMI		–		7	–	1	–	2
Louisville		–		5	–	1	–	0
Middle Tennessee State Normal		–		5	–	1	–	1
Arkansas		–		7	–	2	–	0
Oklahoma		–		6	–	2	–	0
Kendall		–		5	–	2	–	0
Sam Houston Normal		–		3	–	1	–	1
TCU		–		5	–	2	–	1
Furman		–		6	–	3	–	0
Maryland		–		6	–	3	–	0
Ole Miss		–		6	–	3	–	1
Presbyterian		–		5	–	3	–	0
Howard (AL)		–		5	–	3	–	1
Richmond		–		5	–	3	–	1
Chattanooga		–		4	–	3	–	0
Oklahoma A&M		–		4	–	3	–	0
South Carolina		–		4	–	3	–	0
Southern College		–		1	–	1	–	0
Polytechnic (TX)		–		2	–	2	–	4
Southwestern Louisiana Industrial		–		4	–	4	–	0
Southwest Texas State		–		4	–	4	–	0
Spring Hill		–		3	–	3	–	0
West Virginia		–		3	–	4	–	2
Louisiana Industrial		–		3	–	4	–	1
Marshall		–		3	–	4	–	0
Delaware		–		2	–	4	–	2
Catholic University		–		1	–	4	–	1
Davidson		–		2	–	5	–	0
Mississippi Normal		–		1	–	5	–	1
West Tennessee State Normal		–		1	–	2	–	0
North Texas State Normal		–		0	–	1	–	0
Birmingham		–		0	–	5	–	0
Wake Forest		–		0	–	8	–	0

The 1913 Middle Tennessee State Normal football team represented the Middle Tennessee State Normal School (now known as Middle Tennessee State University) during the 1913 college football season. The team captain was W. B. McKnight.

== Schedule ==
Date	Opponent	Site	Result	Source
October 10	Montgomery Bell Academy	Murfreesboro, TN	W 47–0	
October 17	Bowen	Murfreesboro, TN	W 29–0	
October 24	Vanderbilt School of Medicine	Murfreesboro, TN	W 16–14	
October 31	at Fitzgerald and Clark	Tullahoma, TN	W 32–0	
November 7	Vanderbilt reserves	Murfreesboro, TN	T 0–0	
November 22	Hume-Fogg High School	Murfreesboro, TN	W 44–0	
November 27	at Morgan	Fayetteville, TN	L 7–34	
