= 1913 Ole Miss Rebels football team =

American college football season

1913 Ole Miss Rebels football
- Conference: Independent
- Record: 6–3–1
- Head coach: William L. Driver (1st season)
- Captain: Rube Barker

1913 Southern college football independents records
	Conf.			Overall
Team	W	L	T	W		L		T
Stetson		–		3	–	0	–	0
Western Kentucky State Normal		–		1	–	0	–	0
Navy		–		7	–	1	–	1
VMI		–		7	–	1	–	2
Louisville		–		5	–	1	–	0
Middle Tennessee State Normal		–		5	–	1	–	1
Arkansas		–		7	–	2	–	0
Oklahoma		–		6	–	2	–	0
Kendall		–		5	–	2	–	0
Sam Houston Normal		–		3	–	1	–	1
TCU		–		5	–	2	–	1
Furman		–		6	–	3	–	0
Maryland		–		6	–	3	–	0
Ole Miss		–		6	–	3	–	1
Presbyterian		–		5	–	3	–	0
Howard (AL)		–		5	–	3	–	1
Richmond		–		5	–	3	–	1
Chattanooga		–		4	–	3	–	0
Oklahoma A&M		–		4	–	3	–	0
South Carolina		–		4	–	3	–	0
Southern College		–		1	–	1	–	0
Polytechnic (TX)		–		2	–	2	–	4
Southwestern Louisiana Industrial		–		4	–	4	–	0
Southwest Texas State		–		4	–	4	–	0
Spring Hill		–		3	–	3	–	0
West Virginia		–		3	–	4	–	2
Louisiana Industrial		–		3	–	4	–	1
Marshall		–		3	–	4	–	0
Delaware		–		2	–	4	–	2
Catholic University		–		1	–	4	–	1
Davidson		–		2	–	5	–	0
Mississippi Normal		–		1	–	5	–	1
West Tennessee State Normal		–		1	–	2	–	0
North Texas State Normal		–		0	–	1	–	0
Birmingham		–		0	–	5	–	0
Wake Forest		–		0	–	8	–	0

The 1913 Ole Miss Rebels football team represented the University of Mississippi during the 1913 college football season. The team was under suspension from the Southern Intercollegiate Athletic Association.

== Schedule ==
Date	Time	Opponent	Site	Result	Attendance	Source
October 8		at VMI	VMI Parade Ground; Lexington, VA	L 0–14		
October 11		at VPI	Miles Field; Blacksburg, VA	L 14–35		
October 15		at Virginia Medical	Broad Street Park; Richmond, VA	W 7–6		
October 23		Union (TN)	Oxford, MS	W 46–0		
November 1	3:30 p.m.	Louisiana Industrial	University Park; Oxford, MS	W 26–0		
November 7		at Hendrix	Conway, AR	L 6–8		
November 15		at Arkansas	West End Park; Little Rock, AR	W 21–10	2,200	
November 22		at Cumberland (TN)	Red Elm Park; Memphis, TN	W 7–0		
November 27		at Mississippi Normal	Kemper Park; Hattiesburg, MS	W 13–7		
November 28		at Ouachita Baptist	Arkadelphia, AR	T 0–0		
