= 1913 Marshall Thundering Herd football team =

American college football season

1913 Marshall Thundering Herd football
- Conference: Independent
- Record: 3–4
- Head coach: Boyd Chambers (5th season)
- Captain: Jesse Callahan
- Home stadium: Central Field

1913 Southern college football independents records
	Conf.			Overall
Team	W	L	T	W		L		T
Stetson		–		3	–	0	–	0
Western Kentucky State Normal		–		1	–	0	–	0
Navy		–		7	–	1	–	1
VMI		–		7	–	1	–	2
Louisville		–		5	–	1	–	0
Middle Tennessee State Normal		–		5	–	1	–	1
Arkansas		–		7	–	2	–	0
Oklahoma		–		6	–	2	–	0
Kendall		–		5	–	2	–	0
Sam Houston Normal		–		3	–	1	–	1
TCU		–		5	–	2	–	1
Furman		–		6	–	3	–	0
Maryland		–		6	–	3	–	0
Ole Miss		–		6	–	3	–	1
Presbyterian		–		5	–	3	–	0
Howard (AL)		–		5	–	3	–	1
Richmond		–		5	–	3	–	1
Chattanooga		–		4	–	3	–	0
Oklahoma A&M		–		4	–	3	–	0
South Carolina		–		4	–	3	–	0
Southern College		–		1	–	1	–	0
Polytechnic (TX)		–		2	–	2	–	4
Southwestern Louisiana Industrial		–		4	–	4	–	0
Southwest Texas State		–		4	–	4	–	0
Spring Hill		–		3	–	3	–	0
West Virginia		–		3	–	4	–	2
Louisiana Industrial		–		3	–	4	–	1
Marshall		–		3	–	4	–	0
Delaware		–		2	–	4	–	2
Catholic University		–		1	–	4	–	1
Davidson		–		2	–	5	–	0
Mississippi Normal		–		1	–	5	–	1
West Tennessee State Normal		–		1	–	2	–	0
North Texas State Normal		–		0	–	1	–	0
Birmingham		–		0	–	5	–	0
Wake Forest		–		0	–	8	–	0

The 1913 Marshall Thundering Herd football team represented Marshall College (now Marshall University) as an independent during the 1913 college football season. Marshall posted a 3–4 record, being outscored by its opposition 39–101. Home games were played on a campus field called "Central Field" which is presently Campus Commons.

== Schedule ==
Date	Opponent	Site	Result
October 10	Transylvania	Central Field; Huntington, WV	W 14–2
October 18	at Georgetown (KY)	Georgetown, KY	W 7–0
October 25	Marietta	Central Field; Huntington, WV	W 12–7
November 1	at Wheeling STAATS	Wheeling, WV	L 6–26
November 8	at VPI	Miles Field; Blacksburg, VA	L 0–47
November 22	Morris Harvey	Central Field; Huntington, WV	L 0–6
November 27	West Virginia Wesleyan^{†}	Central Field; Huntington, WV	L 0–13
^{†}Homecoming
