= 1913 Sam Houston Normal football team =

American college football season

1913 Sam Houston Normal football
- Conference: Independent
- Record: 3–1–1
- Head coach: Sheldon R. Warner (2nd season)

1913 Southern college football independents records
	Conf.			Overall
Team	W	L	T	W		L		T
Stetson		–		3	–	0	–	0
Western Kentucky State Normal		–		1	–	0	–	0
Navy		–		7	–	1	–	1
VMI		–		7	–	1	–	2
Louisville		–		5	–	1	–	0
Middle Tennessee State Normal		–		5	–	1	–	1
Arkansas		–		7	–	2	–	0
Oklahoma		–		6	–	2	–	0
Kendall		–		5	–	2	–	0
Sam Houston Normal		–		3	–	1	–	1
TCU		–		5	–	2	–	1
Furman		–		6	–	3	–	0
Maryland		–		6	–	3	–	0
Ole Miss		–		6	–	3	–	1
Presbyterian		–		5	–	3	–	0
Howard (AL)		–		5	–	3	–	1
Richmond		–		5	–	3	–	1
Chattanooga		–		4	–	3	–	0
Oklahoma A&M		–		4	–	3	–	0
South Carolina		–		4	–	3	–	0
Southern College		–		1	–	1	–	0
Polytechnic (TX)		–		2	–	2	–	4
Southwestern Louisiana Industrial		–		4	–	4	–	0
Southwest Texas State		–		4	–	4	–	0
Spring Hill		–		3	–	3	–	0
West Virginia		–		3	–	4	–	2
Louisiana Industrial		–		3	–	4	–	1
Marshall		–		3	–	4	–	0
Delaware		–		2	–	4	–	2
Catholic University		–		1	–	4	–	1
Davidson		–		2	–	5	–	0
Mississippi Normal		–		1	–	5	–	1
West Tennessee State Normal		–		1	–	2	–	0
North Texas State Normal		–		0	–	1	–	0
Birmingham		–		0	–	5	–	0
Wake Forest		–		0	–	8	–	0

The 1913 Sam Houston Normal football team represented Sam Houston Normal Institute—now known as Sam Houston State University—as an independent during the 1913 college football season. Led by second-year head coach Sheldon R. Warner, Sam Houston Normal compiled a record of 3–1–1.

== Schedule ==
Date	Opponent	Site	Result	Source
October 27	Bryan Baptist Academy	Huntsville, TX	W 25–0	
November 3	Alexander Institute	Huntsville, TX	W 19–7	
November 8	Rice	Huntsville, TX	Cancelled	
November 18	Allen Academy	Huntsville, TX	T 6–6	
	Rusk Baptist	Huntsville, TX	W 26–6	
	at Alexander Institute	Jacksonville, TX	L 13–16	
