= 1913 William & Mary Orange and Black football team =

American college football season

1913 William & Mary Orange and Black football
- Conference: Eastern Virginia Intercollegiate Athletic Association
- Record: 0–5–1 (0–3 EVIAA)
- Head coach: Dexter W. Draper (1st season)
- Captain: Jack Wright

1913 Eastern Virginia Intercollegiate Athletic Association football standings
| | Conf. | | | | | Overall |
| Team | W | | L | | T | W | | L | | T |
|---|---|---|---|---|---|---|---|---|---|---|
| Richmond $ | 3 | – | 0 | – | 0 | 5 | – | 3 | – | 1 |
| Hampden–Sydney | 2 | – | 1 | – | 0 | 3 | – | 6 | – | 0 |
| Randolph–Macon | 1 | – | 2 | – | 0 | 4 | – | 4 | – | 1 |
| William & Mary | 0 | – | 3 | – | 0 | 0 | – | 5 | – | 1 |
$ – Conference champion

The 1913 William & Mary Orange and Black football team represented the College of William & Mary as a member of the Eastern Virginia Intercollegiate Athletic Association (EVIAA) during the 1913 college football season. Led by first-year head coach Dexter W. Draper, William & Mary finished the season with an overall record of 0–5–1 and a mark of 0–3 in conference play, placing last out of four teams in the EVIAA.

== Schedule ==
| Date | Opponent | Site | Result | Attendance | Source |
|---|---|---|---|---|---|
| October 4 | at VMI* | VMI Parade Ground; Lexington, VA (rivalry) | L 3–33 | | |
| October 11 | Richmond Blues* | Williamsburg, VA | T 0–0 | | |
| November 1 | at Randolph–Macon | Ashland, VA | L 3–37 | | |
| November 8 | vs. Richmond* | Horwitz Park; Newport News, VA (rivalry) | L 13–20 | 1,000 | |
| November 15 | at Hampden–Sydney | Hampden Sydney, VA | L 0–32 | | |
| November 22 | Richmond | Williamsburg, VA | L 13–20 | | |
*Non-conference game
