= 1913 Rice Grays football team =

American college football season

1913 Rice Grays football
- Conference: Texas Intercollegiate Athletic Association
- Record: 4–0 (2–0 TIAA)
- Head coach: Philip Arbuckle (2nd season)
- Captain: George Journeay
- Home stadium: Rice grounds, Hippodrome

1913 Texas Intercollegiate Athletic Association football standings
	Conf.					Overall
Team	W		L		T	W		L		T
Texas $	4	–	0	–	0	7	–	1	–	0
Rice	2	–	0	–	0	4	–	0	–	0
Texas A&M	3	–	0	–	1	3	–	4	–	2
Austin	3	–	2	–	1	3	–	3	–	1
Polytechnic (TX)	3	–	2	–	4	3	–	2	–	4
Baylor	2	–	2	–	2	4	–	4	–	2
Trinity (TX)	2	–	5	–	1	3	–	5	–	1
Southwestern (TX)	1	–	4	–	2	1	–	5	–	2
Daniel Baker	0	–	3	–	1	1	–	4	–	2
$ – Conference champion

The 1913 Rice Grays football team was an American football team that represented Rice Institute as a member of the Texas Intercollegiate Athletic Association (TIAA) during the 1913 college football season. In its second season of intercollegiate football, the team compiled an overall record of 4–0 with a mark of 2–0 in conference play, and outscored opponents by a total of 81 to 14. Philip Arbuckle was the head coach for the second of eleven seasons. End George Journeay was the team captain.

== Schedule ==
Date	Opponent	Site	Result	Source
October 17	Signal Corps, Company B*	Rice grounds; Houston, TX	W 14–0	
October 25	vs. Houston High School*	Houston, TX	W 7–0	
November 8	at Sam Houston Normal	Huntsville, TX	Cancelled	
November 18	Southwestern (TX)	Hippodrome; Houston, TX	W 53–14	
November 27	at Trinity (TX)	Yoakum Athletic Field; Waxahachie, TX	W 7–0	
*Non-conference game
