= 1913 Southwest Texas State football team =

American college football season

1913 Southwest Texas State football
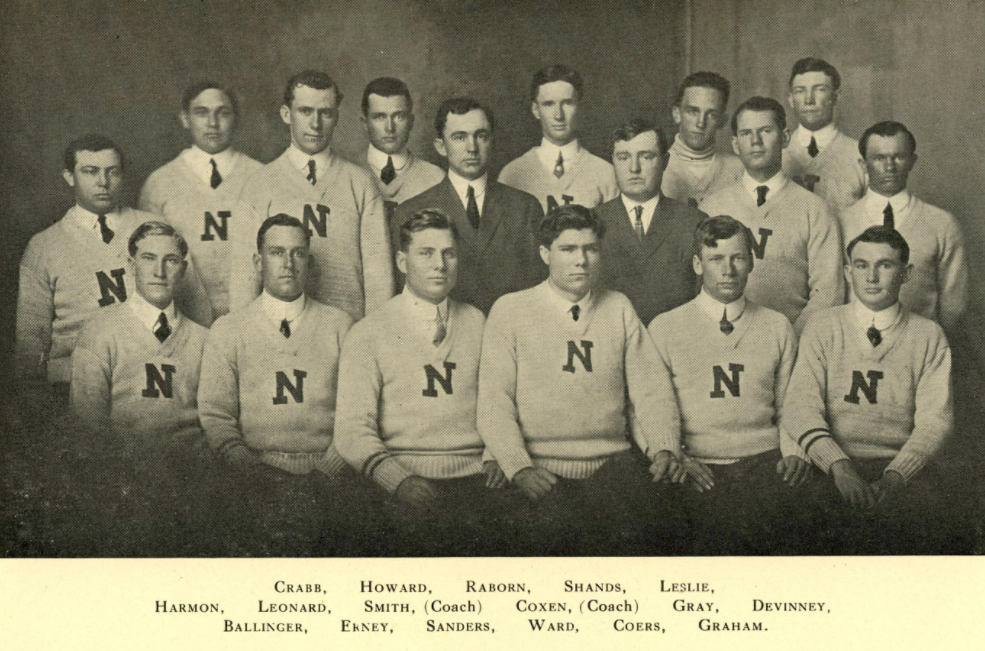
- Conference: Independent
- Record: 4–4
- Head coach: C. Spurgeon Smith (1st season)
- Captain: Coers

1913 Southern college football independents records
	Conf.			Overall
Team	W	L	T	W		L		T
Stetson		–		3	–	0	–	0
Western Kentucky State Normal		–		1	–	0	–	0
Navy		–		7	–	1	–	1
VMI		–		7	–	1	–	2
Louisville		–		5	–	1	–	0
Middle Tennessee State Normal		–		5	–	1	–	1
Arkansas		–		7	–	2	–	0
Oklahoma		–		6	–	2	–	0
Kendall		–		5	–	2	–	0
Sam Houston Normal		–		3	–	1	–	1
TCU		–		5	–	2	–	1
Furman		–		6	–	3	–	0
Maryland		–		6	–	3	–	0
Ole Miss		–		6	–	3	–	1
Presbyterian		–		5	–	3	–	0
Howard (AL)		–		5	–	3	–	1
Richmond		–		5	–	3	–	1
Chattanooga		–		4	–	3	–	0
Oklahoma A&M		–		4	–	3	–	0
South Carolina		–		4	–	3	–	0
Southern College		–		1	–	1	–	0
Polytechnic (TX)		–		2	–	2	–	4
Southwestern Louisiana Industrial		–		4	–	4	–	0
Southwest Texas State		–		4	–	4	–	0
Spring Hill		–		3	–	3	–	0
West Virginia		–		3	–	4	–	2
Louisiana Industrial		–		3	–	4	–	1
Marshall		–		3	–	4	–	0
Delaware		–		2	–	4	–	2
Catholic University		–		1	–	4	–	1
Davidson		–		2	–	5	–	0
Mississippi Normal		–		1	–	5	–	1
West Tennessee State Normal		–		1	–	2	–	0
North Texas State Normal		–		0	–	1	–	0
Birmingham		–		0	–	5	–	0
Wake Forest		–		0	–	8	–	0

The 1913 Southwest Texas State football team was an American football team that represented Southwest Texas State Normal School—now known as Texas State University–as an independent during the 1913 college football season. The team was led by first-year head coach C. Spurgeon Smith and finished the season with a record of 4–4. The team's captain was Coers, who played halfback.

== Schedule ==
Date	Opponent	Site	Result	Source
October 6	at Coronal Institute	Coronal Field; San Marcos, TX	W 6–0	
October 13	Stephen F. Austin High School	Fair Grounds	L 7–13	
October 18	at West Texas Military Academy	High School Grounds	W 13–7	
October 26	at Marshall Training School	San Antonio, TX	L 7–33	
November 3	St. Edward's	Academy Field; San Marcos, TX	L 6–7	
November 10	San Antonio High School	Academy Field; San Marcos, TX	W 32-14	
November 13	Coronal Institute	Academy Field; San Marcos, TX	W 14–0	
November 22	St. Edward's	Academy Field; San Marcos, TX	L 0–34	
