= 1913 West Virginia Mountaineers football team =

American college football season

1913 West Virginia Mountaineers football
- Conference: Independent
- Record: 3–4–2
- Head coach: Edwin Sweetland (1st season)
- Captain: Melville Boyles

1913 Southern college football independents records
	Conf.			Overall
Team	W	L	T	W		L		T
Stetson		–		3	–	0	–	0
Western Kentucky State Normal		–		1	–	0	–	0
Navy		–		7	–	1	–	1
VMI		–		7	–	1	–	2
Louisville		–		5	–	1	–	0
Middle Tennessee State Normal		–		5	–	1	–	1
Arkansas		–		7	–	2	–	0
Oklahoma		–		6	–	2	–	0
Kendall		–		5	–	2	–	0
Sam Houston Normal		–		3	–	1	–	1
TCU		–		5	–	2	–	1
Furman		–		6	–	3	–	0
Maryland		–		6	–	3	–	0
Ole Miss		–		6	–	3	–	1
Presbyterian		–		5	–	3	–	0
Howard (AL)		–		5	–	3	–	1
Richmond		–		5	–	3	–	1
Chattanooga		–		4	–	3	–	0
Oklahoma A&M		–		4	–	3	–	0
South Carolina		–		4	–	3	–	0
Southern College		–		1	–	1	–	0
Polytechnic (TX)		–		2	–	2	–	4
Southwestern Louisiana Industrial		–		4	–	4	–	0
Southwest Texas State		–		4	–	4	–	0
Spring Hill		–		3	–	3	–	0
West Virginia		–		3	–	4	–	2
Louisiana Industrial		–		3	–	4	–	1
Marshall		–		3	–	4	–	0
Delaware		–		2	–	4	–	2
Catholic University		–		1	–	4	–	1
Davidson		–		2	–	5	–	0
Mississippi Normal		–		1	–	5	–	1
West Tennessee State Normal		–		1	–	2	–	0
North Texas State Normal		–		0	–	1	–	0
Birmingham		–		0	–	5	–	0
Wake Forest		–		0	–	8	–	0

The 1913 West Virginia Mountaineers football team was an American football team that represented West Virginia University as an independent during the 1913 college football season. In its first and only season under head coach Edwin Sweetland, the team compiled a 3–4–2 record and was outscored by a total of 137 to 109. Melville Boyles was the team captain.

== Schedule ==
Date	Opponent	Site	Result	Attendance	Source
September 27	Davis & Elkins	Morgantown, WV	W 43–0		
October 4	Waynesburg	Morgantown, WV	W 45–0		
October 11	at Pittsburgh	Forbes Field; Pittsburgh, PA (rivalry)	L 0–40		
October 18	vs. West Virginia Wesleyan	Fairmont, WV	L 0–21		
October 25	Morris Harvey	Morgantown, WV	T 0–0		
November 1	Marietta	Morgantown, WV	T 14–14		
November 8	Washington & Jefferson	Morgantown, WV	L 0–34	2,000	
November 15	vs. Washington and Lee	Charleston, WV	L 0–28		
November 27	Villanova	Morgantown, WV	W 7–0		
