= 1913 TCU football team =

American college football season

1913 TCU football
- Conference: Independent
- Record: 5–2–1
- Head coach: Fred Cahoon (1st season)
- Captain: Allen Freeman

1913 Southern college football independents records
	Conf.			Overall
Team	W	L	T	W		L		T
Stetson		–		3	–	0	–	0
Western Kentucky State Normal		–		1	–	0	–	0
Navy		–		7	–	1	–	1
VMI		–		7	–	1	–	2
Louisville		–		5	–	1	–	0
Middle Tennessee State Normal		–		5	–	1	–	1
Arkansas		–		7	–	2	–	0
Oklahoma		–		6	–	2	–	0
Kendall		–		5	–	2	–	0
Sam Houston Normal		–		3	–	1	–	1
TCU		–		5	–	2	–	1
Furman		–		6	–	3	–	0
Maryland		–		6	–	3	–	0
Ole Miss		–		6	–	3	–	1
Presbyterian		–		5	–	3	–	0
Howard (AL)		–		5	–	3	–	1
Richmond		–		5	–	3	–	1
Chattanooga		–		4	–	3	–	0
Oklahoma A&M		–		4	–	3	–	0
South Carolina		–		4	–	3	–	0
Southern College		–		1	–	1	–	0
Polytechnic (TX)		–		2	–	2	–	4
Southwestern Louisiana Industrial		–		4	–	4	–	0
Southwest Texas State		–		4	–	4	–	0
Spring Hill		–		3	–	3	–	0
West Virginia		–		3	–	4	–	2
Louisiana Industrial		–		3	–	4	–	1
Marshall		–		3	–	4	–	0
Delaware		–		2	–	4	–	2
Catholic University		–		1	–	4	–	1
Davidson		–		2	–	5	–	0
Mississippi Normal		–		1	–	5	–	1
West Tennessee State Normal		–		1	–	2	–	0
North Texas State Normal		–		0	–	1	–	0
Birmingham		–		0	–	5	–	0
Wake Forest		–		0	–	8	–	0

The 1913 TCU football team represented Texas Christian University (TCU) as an independent during the 1913 college football season. TCU did not compete in the Texas Intercollegiate Athletic Association (TIAA) as they had in 1912. Led by Fred Cahoon in his first and only year as head coach, TCU finished the season with a record of 5–2–1. Allen Freeman, who played tackle, was the team's captain and Luther Parker was the manager.

== Schedule ==
Date	Time	Opponent	Site	Result	Attendance	Source
October 6		at Weatherford High School (OK)	Fair Park; Weatherford, OK	T 0–0		
October 11		YMCA	Fort Worth, TX	W 32–6	200	
October 18	4:00 p.m.	Dallas	Fort Worth, TX	L 0-10		
October 25		at Howard Payne	Daniel Baker Park; Brownwood, TX	W 7–0		
November 1		YMCA	TCU grounds; Fort Worth, TX	W 14–0		
November 10		at Burleson	Greenville, TX	W 25–0		
November 22		at North Texas State Normal	Denton, TX	W 13–0		
November 27		at Dallas	Gaston Field; Dallas, TX	L 0–6		
