= Dexter W. Draper =

American sports coach (1881–1961)

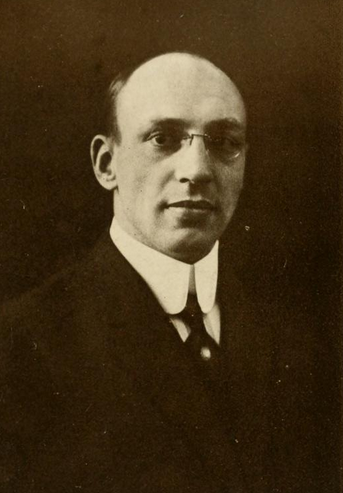
- Draper pictured in The Colonial Echo 1914, William & Mary yearbook

Biographical details
- Born: May 23, 1881; Boston, Massachusetts, U.S.
- Died: August 22, 1961 (aged 80); Lancaster, Pennsylvania, U.S.

Playing career

Football
- 1901: Swarthmore
- 1904: Springfield
- 1905–1908: Penn
- Position: Tackle

Coaching career (HC unless noted)

Football
- 1909: Texas
- 1911–1912: Franklin & Marshall
- 1913–1915: William & Mary

Basketball
- 1911–1913: Franklin & Marshall
- 1913–1916: William & Mary

Baseball
- 1916: William & Mary

Administrative career (AD unless noted)
- 1913–1916: William & Mary

Head coaching record
- Overall: 14–34–3 (football); 26–29 (basketball); 17–1 (baseball)

Accomplishments and honors

Awards
- Consensus All-American (1907); Second-team All-American (1906); Third-team All-American (1908)

Dexter Wright Draper (May 23, 1881 – August 22, 1961) was an American college football player and coach, as well as a pediatrician. He was an All-American tackle at the University of Pennsylvania from 1905 to 1907. Draper became head football coach at the University of Texas immediately following the resignation of W. E. Metzenthin in 1909. After compiling a 4–3–1 record, including two losses to Longhorns rival Texas A&M, Draper resigned. He later coached at Franklin & Marshall College and The College of William & Mary before entering his chosen field as a pediatrician. Draper also was the head coach for the William & Mary Tribe men's basketball team from 1913 to 1916. He led the Tribe to a 15–18 record during his two-year tenure. Draper's stint as the football coach from 1913 to 1915 produced a 1–21–2 record.

On August 22, 1961, Draper died aged 80 at a hospital in Lancaster, Pennsylvania after a short illness.

== Head coaching record ==
=== Football ===
Year	Team	Overall	Conference	Standing	Bowl/playoffs
Texas Longhorns (Independent) (1909)
1909	Texas	4–3–1			
Texas:		4–3–1			
Franklin & Marshall (Independent) (1911–1912)
1911	Franklin & Marshall	3–6			
1912	Franklin & Marshall	6–4			
Franklin & Marshall:		9–10			
William & Mary Orange and Black (Eastern Virginia Intercollegiate Athletic Association) (1913–1915)
1913	William & Mary	0–5–1	0–3	4th	
1914	William & Mary	1–7	1–5	4th	
1915	William & Mary	0–9–1	0–6	4th	
William & Mary:		1–21–2	1–14		
Total:		14–34–3			

=== Basketball ===
Record table
Season	Team	Overall	Conference	Standing	Postseason
William & Mary Indians (Independent) (1913–1916)
1913–14	William & Mary	3–6			
1914–15	William & Mary	5–8			
1915–16	William & Mary	7–4			
Total:		15–18			
