= 1913 Furman Baptists football team =

American college football season

1913 Furman Baptists football
- Conference: Independent
- Record: 6–3
- Head coach: Cuppy Farmer (1st season)
- Captain: Arthur C. Skinner
- Home stadium: League Park

1913 Southern college football independents records
	Conf.			Overall
Team	W	L	T	W		L		T
Stetson		–		3	–	0	–	0
Western Kentucky State Normal		–		1	–	0	–	0
Navy		–		7	–	1	–	1
VMI		–		7	–	1	–	2
Louisville		–		5	–	1	–	0
Middle Tennessee State Normal		–		5	–	1	–	1
Arkansas		–		7	–	2	–	0
Oklahoma		–		6	–	2	–	0
Kendall		–		5	–	2	–	0
Sam Houston Normal		–		3	–	1	–	1
TCU		–		5	–	2	–	1
Furman		–		6	–	3	–	0
Maryland		–		6	–	3	–	0
Ole Miss		–		6	–	3	–	1
Presbyterian		–		5	–	3	–	0
Howard (AL)		–		5	–	3	–	1
Richmond		–		5	–	3	–	1
Chattanooga		–		4	–	3	–	0
Oklahoma A&M		–		4	–	3	–	0
South Carolina		–		4	–	3	–	0
Southern College		–		1	–	1	–	0
Polytechnic (TX)		–		2	–	2	–	4
Southwestern Louisiana Industrial		–		4	–	4	–	0
Southwest Texas State		–		4	–	4	–	0
Spring Hill		–		3	–	3	–	0
West Virginia		–		3	–	4	–	2
Louisiana Industrial		–		3	–	4	–	1
Marshall		–		3	–	4	–	0
Delaware		–		2	–	4	–	2
Catholic University		–		1	–	4	–	1
Davidson		–		2	–	5	–	0
Mississippi Normal		–		1	–	5	–	1
West Tennessee State Normal		–		1	–	2	–	0
North Texas State Normal		–		0	–	1	–	0
Birmingham		–		0	–	5	–	0
Wake Forest		–		0	–	8	–	0

The 1913 Furman Baptists football team represented Furman University as an independent during the 1913 college football season. Led by Cuppy Farmer in his first and only season as head coach, Furman compiled a record of 6–3.

== Schedule ==
Date	Time	Opponent	Site	Result	Source
September 27		Clemson freshmen	Greenville, SC	W 7–2	
October 4		Riverside Military Academy	Greenville, SC	L 6–7	
October 11		College of Charleston	League Park; Greenville, SC	W 38–0	
October 22		vs. Newberry	Union County Fair grounds; Union, SC	L 7–16	
October 25	4:00 p.m.	Bailey Military Institute	League Park; Greenville, SC	W 59–0	
November 1		The Citadel	College Park Stadium; Charleston, SC (rivalry)	L 0–75	
November 3		at College of Charleston	Charleston, SC	W 30–0	
November 21		Presbyterian	Greenville, SC	W 65–0	
November 27		Clemson freshmen	Greenville, SC	W 40–0	
