= 1913 West Tennessee State Normal football team =

American college football season

1913 West Tennessee State Normal football
- Conference: Independent
- Record: 1–2
- Head coach: Clyde H. Wilson (2nd season)
- Captain: Erroll Hay
- Home stadium: Red Elm Park, Normal campus

1913 Southern college football independents records
| | Conf. | | | Overall |
| Team | W | L | T | W | | L | | T |
|---|---|---|---|---|---|---|---|---|
| Stetson | | – | | 3 | – | 0 | – | 0 |
| Western Kentucky State Normal | | – | | 1 | – | 0 | – | 0 |
| Navy | | – | | 7 | – | 1 | – | 1 |
| VMI | | – | | 7 | – | 1 | – | 2 |
| Louisville | | – | | 5 | – | 1 | – | 0 |
| Middle Tennessee State Normal | | – | | 5 | – | 1 | – | 1 |
| Arkansas | | – | | 7 | – | 2 | – | 0 |
| Oklahoma | | – | | 6 | – | 2 | – | 0 |
| Kendall | | – | | 5 | – | 2 | – | 0 |
| Sam Houston Normal | | – | | 3 | – | 1 | – | 1 |
| TCU | | – | | 5 | – | 2 | – | 1 |
| Furman | | – | | 6 | – | 3 | – | 0 |
| Maryland | | – | | 6 | – | 3 | – | 0 |
| Ole Miss | | – | | 6 | – | 3 | – | 1 |
| Presbyterian | | – | | 5 | – | 3 | – | 0 |
| Howard (AL) | | – | | 5 | – | 3 | – | 1 |
| Richmond | | – | | 5 | – | 3 | – | 1 |
| Chattanooga | | – | | 4 | – | 3 | – | 0 |
| Oklahoma A&M | | – | | 4 | – | 3 | – | 0 |
| South Carolina | | – | | 4 | – | 3 | – | 0 |
| Southern College | | – | | 1 | – | 1 | – | 0 |
| Polytechnic (TX) | | – | | 2 | – | 2 | – | 4 |
| Southwestern Louisiana Industrial | | – | | 4 | – | 4 | – | 0 |
| Southwest Texas State | | – | | 4 | – | 4 | – | 0 |
| Spring Hill | | – | | 3 | – | 3 | – | 0 |
| West Virginia | | – | | 3 | – | 4 | – | 2 |
| Louisiana Industrial | | – | | 3 | – | 4 | – | 1 |
| Marshall | | – | | 3 | – | 4 | – | 0 |
| Delaware | | – | | 2 | – | 4 | – | 2 |
| Catholic University | | – | | 1 | – | 4 | – | 1 |
| Davidson | | – | | 2 | – | 5 | – | 0 |
| Mississippi Normal | | – | | 1 | – | 5 | – | 1 |
| West Tennessee State Normal | | – | | 1 | – | 2 | – | 0 |
| North Texas State Normal | | – | | 0 | – | 1 | – | 0 |
| Birmingham | | – | | 0 | – | 5 | – | 0 |
| Wake Forest | | – | | 0 | – | 8 | – | 0 |

The 1913 West Tennessee State Normal football team was an American football team that represented West Tennessee State Normal School (now known as the University of Memphis) as an independent during the 1913 college football season. In their second season under head coach Clyde H. Wilson, West Tennessee State Normal compiled a 1–2 record.

== Schedule ==
| Date | Time | Opponent | Site | Result | Source |
|---|---|---|---|---|---|
| October 17 | 3:30 p.m. | Central High School | Red Elm Park; Memphis, TN | L 0–67 | |
| November 8 | 3:00 p.m. | Memphis University School | Red Elm Park; Memphis, TN | L 6–19 | |
| November 15 | 10:00 a.m. | Somerville High School | Normal campus; Memphis, TN | W 13–0 | |
