= 1913 Baylor football team =

American college football season

1913 Baylor football
- Conference: Texas Intercollegiate Athletic Association
- Record: 4–4–2 (2–2–2 TIAA)
- Head coach: Norman C. Paine (1st season)
- Captain: Floyd F. Fouts
- Home stadium: Carroll Field

1913 Texas Intercollegiate Athletic Association football standings
	Conf.					Overall
Team	W		L		T	W		L		T
Texas $	4	–	0	–	0	7	–	1	–	0
Rice	2	–	0	–	0	4	–	0	–	0
Texas A&M	3	–	0	–	1	3	–	4	–	2
Austin	3	–	2	–	1	3	–	3	–	1
Polytechnic (TX)	3	–	2	–	4	3	–	2	–	4
Baylor	2	–	2	–	2	4	–	4	–	2
Trinity (TX)	2	–	5	–	1	3	–	5	–	1
Southwestern (TX)	1	–	4	–	2	1	–	5	–	2
Daniel Baker	0	–	3	–	1	1	–	4	–	2
$ – Conference champion

The 1913 Baylor football team was an American football team that represented Baylor University as a member of the Texas Intercollegiate Athletic Association (TIAA) during the 1913 college football season. In its first season under head coach Norman C. Paine, the team compiled an overall record of 4–4–2 with a mark of 2–2–2 in conference play, and was outscored by a total of 208 to 67.

== Schedule ==
Date	Opponent	Site	Result	Source
September 27	Howard Payne*	Carroll Field; Waco, TX	W 15–6	
October 4	San Marcos Baptist Academy*	Carroll Field; Waco, TX	W 9–7	
October 11	Polytechnic (TX)	Carroll Field; Waco, TX	T 0–0	
October 16	at Texas	Clark Field; Austin, TX (rivalry)	L 0–77	
October 22	at LSU*	State Field; Baton Rouge, LA	L 0–50	
October 25	at Arkansas*	The Hill; Fayetteville, AR	L 0–34	
October 31	at Trinity (TX)	Yoakum Field; Waxahachie, TX	W 16–0	
November 4	Daniel Baker	Carroll Field; Waco, TX	W 6–0	
November 22	at Texas A&M	Kyle Field; College Station, TX (rivalry)	T 14–14	
November 27	Southwestern (TX)	Carroll Field; Waco, TX	L 7–14	
*Non-conference game
