= 1913 Louisville Cardinals football team =

American college football season

1913 Louisville Cardinals football
- Conference: Independent
- Record: 5–1
- Head coach: Lester Larson (2nd season)
- Home stadium: Eclipse Park

1913 Southern college football independents records
	Conf.			Overall
Team	W	L	T	W		L		T
Stetson		–		3	–	0	–	0
Western Kentucky State Normal		–		1	–	0	–	0
Navy		–		7	–	1	–	1
VMI		–		7	–	1	–	2
Louisville		–		5	–	1	–	0
Middle Tennessee State Normal		–		5	–	1	–	1
Arkansas		–		7	–	2	–	0
Oklahoma		–		6	–	2	–	0
Kendall		–		5	–	2	–	0
Sam Houston Normal		–		3	–	1	–	1
TCU		–		5	–	2	–	1
Furman		–		6	–	3	–	0
Maryland		–		6	–	3	–	0
Ole Miss		–		6	–	3	–	1
Presbyterian		–		5	–	3	–	0
Howard (AL)		–		5	–	3	–	1
Richmond		–		5	–	3	–	1
Chattanooga		–		4	–	3	–	0
Oklahoma A&M		–		4	–	3	–	0
South Carolina		–		4	–	3	–	0
Southern College		–		1	–	1	–	0
Polytechnic (TX)		–		2	–	2	–	4
Southwestern Louisiana Industrial		–		4	–	4	–	0
Southwest Texas State		–		4	–	4	–	0
Spring Hill		–		3	–	3	–	0
West Virginia		–		3	–	4	–	2
Louisiana Industrial		–		3	–	4	–	1
Marshall		–		3	–	4	–	0
Delaware		–		2	–	4	–	2
Catholic University		–		1	–	4	–	1
Davidson		–		2	–	5	–	0
Mississippi Normal		–		1	–	5	–	1
West Tennessee State Normal		–		1	–	2	–	0
North Texas State Normal		–		0	–	1	–	0
Birmingham		–		0	–	5	–	0
Wake Forest		–		0	–	8	–	0

The 1913 Louisville Cardinals football team was an American football team that represented the University of Louisville as an independent during the 1913 college football season. In their second season under head coach Lester Larson, the Cardinals compiled a 5–1 record, did not allow a point in their first five games, and outscored all opponents by a total of 257 to 20. The team played its home games at Eclipse Park in Louisville, Kentucky.

== Schedule ==
Date	Opponent	Site	Result	Attendance	Source
October 4	Bethel (KY)	Eclipse Park; Louisville, KY	W 48–0		
October 11	at Moores Hill	Moores Hill, IN	W 77–0		
October 18	Washington College	Eclipse Park; Louisville, KY	W 100–0		
October 25	Cumberland (TN)	Eclipse Park; Louisville, KY	W 6–0		
November 1	Butler	Eclipse Park; Louisville, KY	W 26–0		
November 22	Kentucky	Eclipse Park; Louisville, KY (rivalry)	L 0–20	4,000	
