= 1913 Delaware Fightin' Blue Hens football team =

American college football season

1913 Delaware Fightin' Blue Hens football
- Conference: Independent
- Record: 2–4–2
- Head coach: William McAvoy (6th season)
- Captain: William F. Cann
- Home stadium: Frazer Field

1913 Southern college football independents records
	Conf.			Overall
Team	W	L	T	W		L		T
Stetson		–		3	–	0	–	0
Western Kentucky State Normal		–		1	–	0	–	0
Navy		–		7	–	1	–	1
VMI		–		7	–	1	–	2
Louisville		–		5	–	1	–	0
Middle Tennessee State Normal		–		5	–	1	–	1
Arkansas		–		7	–	2	–	0
Oklahoma		–		6	–	2	–	0
Kendall		–		5	–	2	–	0
Sam Houston Normal		–		3	–	1	–	1
TCU		–		5	–	2	–	1
Furman		–		6	–	3	–	0
Maryland		–		6	–	3	–	0
Ole Miss		–		6	–	3	–	1
Presbyterian		–		5	–	3	–	0
Howard (AL)		–		5	–	3	–	1
Richmond		–		5	–	3	–	1
Chattanooga		–		4	–	3	–	0
Oklahoma A&M		–		4	–	3	–	0
South Carolina		–		4	–	3	–	0
Southern College		–		1	–	1	–	0
Polytechnic (TX)		–		2	–	2	–	4
Southwestern Louisiana Industrial		–		4	–	4	–	0
Southwest Texas State		–		4	–	4	–	0
Spring Hill		–		3	–	3	–	0
West Virginia		–		3	–	4	–	2
Louisiana Industrial		–		3	–	4	–	1
Marshall		–		3	–	4	–	0
Delaware		–		2	–	4	–	2
Catholic University		–		1	–	4	–	1
Davidson		–		2	–	5	–	0
Mississippi Normal		–		1	–	5	–	1
West Tennessee State Normal		–		1	–	2	–	0
North Texas State Normal		–		0	–	1	–	0
Birmingham		–		0	–	5	–	0
Wake Forest		–		0	–	8	–	0

The 1913 Delaware Fightin' Blue Hens football team was an American football team that represented Delaware College (later renamed the University of Delaware) as an independent during the 1913 college football season. In its sixth season under head coach William McAvoy, the team compiled a 2–4–2 record and was outscored by a total of 82 to 55. William F. Cann was the team captain.

The 1914 season was the first for Delaware at the newly-constructed Frazer Field, known at the time as Joe Frazer Field. The field was built at an estimated cost of $30,000 and included "a handsome memorial gate costing $5,000, in memory of Joseph Frazer." Frazer was an alumnus of Delaware College who became wealthy building a railroad in Bolivia, where he died.

== Schedule ==
Date	Opponent	Site	Result	Attendance	Source
October 4	Haverford	Frazer Field; Newark, DE	L 0–7	1,000	
October 11	Pennsylvania Military	Frazer Field; Newark, DE	T 0–0		
October 18	Temple	Frazer Field; Newark, DE	W 28–0		
October 25	Catholic University	Frazer Field; Newark, DE	T 0–0		
November 1	at Stevens	Hoboken, NJ	L 0–14		
November 8	Washington College	Frazer Field; Newark, DE	L 0–13		
November 15	Mount St. Mary's	Frazer Field; Newark, DE	W 20–13		
November 22	Dickinson	Frazer Field; Newark, DE	L 7–35		
