= 1913 Oklahoma A&M Aggies football team =

American college football season

1913 Oklahoma A&M Aggies football
- Conference: Independent
- Record: 4–3
- Head coach: Paul J. Davis (5th season)

1913 Southern college football independents records
	Conf.			Overall
Team	W	L	T	W		L		T
Stetson		–		3	–	0	–	0
Western Kentucky State Normal		–		1	–	0	–	0
Navy		–		7	–	1	–	1
VMI		–		7	–	1	–	2
Louisville		–		5	–	1	–	0
Middle Tennessee State Normal		–		5	–	1	–	1
Arkansas		–		7	–	2	–	0
Oklahoma		–		6	–	2	–	0
Kendall		–		5	–	2	–	0
Sam Houston Normal		–		3	–	1	–	1
TCU		–		5	–	2	–	1
Furman		–		6	–	3	–	0
Maryland		–		6	–	3	–	0
Ole Miss		–		6	–	3	–	1
Presbyterian		–		5	–	3	–	0
Howard (AL)		–		5	–	3	–	1
Richmond		–		5	–	3	–	1
Chattanooga		–		4	–	3	–	0
Oklahoma A&M		–		4	–	3	–	0
South Carolina		–		4	–	3	–	0
Southern College		–		1	–	1	–	0
Polytechnic (TX)		–		2	–	2	–	4
Southwestern Louisiana Industrial		–		4	–	4	–	0
Southwest Texas State		–		4	–	4	–	0
Spring Hill		–		3	–	3	–	0
West Virginia		–		3	–	4	–	2
Louisiana Industrial		–		3	–	4	–	1
Marshall		–		3	–	4	–	0
Delaware		–		2	–	4	–	2
Catholic University		–		1	–	4	–	1
Davidson		–		2	–	5	–	0
Mississippi Normal		–		1	–	5	–	1
West Tennessee State Normal		–		1	–	2	–	0
North Texas State Normal		–		0	–	1	–	0
Birmingham		–		0	–	5	–	0
Wake Forest		–		0	–	8	–	0

The 1913 Oklahoma A&M Aggies football team represented Oklahoma A&M College in the 1913 college football season. This was the 13th year of football at A&M and the fifth under Paul J. Davis. The Aggies played their home games in Stillwater, Oklahoma. They finished the season 4–3.

== Schedule ==
Date	Opponent	Site	Result	Attendance	Source
October 10	Phillips	Stillwater, OK	W 112–3		
October 18	at Arkansas	The Hill; Fayetteville, AR	L 0–3		
October 25	Washburn	Stillwater, OK	W 3–0	1,500	
November 10	Texas A&M	Stillwater, OK	W 3–0		
November 15	Tonkawa Prep	Stillwater, OK	W 47–0		
November 21	Oklahoma	Stillwater, OK (Bedlam)	L 0–7	2,000	
Nomveber 27	Missouri Mines	Muskogee, OK	L 0–14	1,000	
