= 1913 Mississippi Normal Normalites football team =

American college football season

1913 Mississippi Normal Normalites football
- Conference: Independent
- Record: 1–5–1
- Head coach: Blondie Williams (1st season)
- Home stadium: Kamper Park

1913 Southern college football independents records
| | Conf. | | | Overall |
| Team | W | L | T | W | | L | | T |
|---|---|---|---|---|---|---|---|---|
| Stetson | | – | | 3 | – | 0 | – | 0 |
| Western Kentucky State Normal | | – | | 1 | – | 0 | – | 0 |
| Navy | | – | | 7 | – | 1 | – | 1 |
| VMI | | – | | 7 | – | 1 | – | 2 |
| Louisville | | – | | 5 | – | 1 | – | 0 |
| Middle Tennessee State Normal | | – | | 5 | – | 1 | – | 1 |
| Arkansas | | – | | 7 | – | 2 | – | 0 |
| Oklahoma | | – | | 6 | – | 2 | – | 0 |
| Kendall | | – | | 5 | – | 2 | – | 0 |
| Sam Houston Normal | | – | | 3 | – | 1 | – | 1 |
| TCU | | – | | 5 | – | 2 | – | 1 |
| Furman | | – | | 6 | – | 3 | – | 0 |
| Maryland | | – | | 6 | – | 3 | – | 0 |
| Ole Miss | | – | | 6 | – | 3 | – | 1 |
| Presbyterian | | – | | 5 | – | 3 | – | 0 |
| Howard (AL) | | – | | 5 | – | 3 | – | 1 |
| Richmond | | – | | 5 | – | 3 | – | 1 |
| Chattanooga | | – | | 4 | – | 3 | – | 0 |
| Oklahoma A&M | | – | | 4 | – | 3 | – | 0 |
| South Carolina | | – | | 4 | – | 3 | – | 0 |
| Southern College | | – | | 1 | – | 1 | – | 0 |
| Polytechnic (TX) | | – | | 2 | – | 2 | – | 4 |
| Southwestern Louisiana Industrial | | – | | 4 | – | 4 | – | 0 |
| Southwest Texas State | | – | | 4 | – | 4 | – | 0 |
| Spring Hill | | – | | 3 | – | 3 | – | 0 |
| West Virginia | | – | | 3 | – | 4 | – | 2 |
| Louisiana Industrial | | – | | 3 | – | 4 | – | 1 |
| Marshall | | – | | 3 | – | 4 | – | 0 |
| Delaware | | – | | 2 | – | 4 | – | 2 |
| Catholic University | | – | | 1 | – | 4 | – | 1 |
| Davidson | | – | | 2 | – | 5 | – | 0 |
| Mississippi Normal | | – | | 1 | – | 5 | – | 1 |
| West Tennessee State Normal | | – | | 1 | – | 2 | – | 0 |
| North Texas State Normal | | – | | 0 | – | 1 | – | 0 |
| Birmingham | | – | | 0 | – | 5 | – | 0 |
| Wake Forest | | – | | 0 | – | 8 | – | 0 |

The 1913 Mississippi Normal Normalites football team was an American football team that represented Mississippi Normal College (now known as the University of Southern Mississippi) as an independent during the 1913 college football season. In their only year under head coach Blondie Williams, the team compiled a 1–5–1 record.

== Schedule ==
| Date | Opponent | Site | Result | Source |
|---|---|---|---|---|
| September 27 | at Poplarville High School | Poplarville H.S. Stadium; Poplarville, MS | L 0–25 | |
| October 11 | at Gulf Coast Military Academy | Gulfport, MS | L 0–19 | |
| October 18 | Mobile Military Academy | Kamper Park; Hattiesburg, MS | W 11–0 | |
| November 8 | at Mobile Military Academy | Mobile, AL | L 0–14 | |
| October 25 | Gulf Coast Military Academy | Kamper Park; Hattiesburg, MS | L 6–11 | |
| November 22 | Poplarville High School | Kamper Park; Hattiesburg, MS | T 0–0 | |
| November 27 | Ole Miss | Kamper Park; Hattiesburg, MS | L 7–13 | |
