= 1913 Chattanooga Moccasins football team =

American college football season

1913 Chattanooga Moccasins football
- Conference: Independent
- Record: 4–3
- Head coach: Leslie Stauffer (4th season)
- Captain: Tex Harbour
- Home stadium: Chamberlain Field

1913 Southern college football independents records
	Conf.			Overall
Team	W	L	T	W		L		T
Stetson		–		3	–	0	–	0
Western Kentucky State Normal		–		1	–	0	–	0
Navy		–		7	–	1	–	1
VMI		–		7	–	1	–	2
Louisville		–		5	–	1	–	0
Middle Tennessee State Normal		–		5	–	1	–	1
Arkansas		–		7	–	2	–	0
Oklahoma		–		6	–	2	–	0
Kendall		–		5	–	2	–	0
Sam Houston Normal		–		3	–	1	–	1
TCU		–		5	–	2	–	1
Furman		–		6	–	3	–	0
Maryland		–		6	–	3	–	0
Ole Miss		–		6	–	3	–	1
Presbyterian		–		5	–	3	–	0
Howard (AL)		–		5	–	3	–	1
Richmond		–		5	–	3	–	1
Chattanooga		–		4	–	3	–	0
Oklahoma A&M		–		4	–	3	–	0
South Carolina		–		4	–	3	–	0
Southern College		–		1	–	1	–	0
Polytechnic (TX)		–		2	–	2	–	4
Southwestern Louisiana Industrial		–		4	–	4	–	0
Southwest Texas State		–		4	–	4	–	0
Spring Hill		–		3	–	3	–	0
West Virginia		–		3	–	4	–	2
Louisiana Industrial		–		3	–	4	–	1
Marshall		–		3	–	4	–	0
Delaware		–		2	–	4	–	2
Catholic University		–		1	–	4	–	1
Davidson		–		2	–	5	–	0
Mississippi Normal		–		1	–	5	–	1
West Tennessee State Normal		–		1	–	2	–	0
North Texas State Normal		–		0	–	1	–	0
Birmingham		–		0	–	5	–	0
Wake Forest		–		0	–	8	–	0

The 1913 Chattanooga Moccasins football team represented the University of Chattanooga (now known as the University of Tennessee at Chattanooga) as an independent during the 1913 college football season. They finished their seven-game schedule with a record of 4–3.

== Schedule ==
Date	Opponent	Site	Result	Source
October 4	at Sewanee	Hardee Field; Sewanee, TN	L 0–28	
October 12	Georgia Tech	Chamberlain Field; Chattanooga, TN	L 6–71	
October 25	Birmingham	Chamberlain Field; Chattanooga, TN	W 84–0	
November 1	at Tennessee	Waite Field; Knoxville, TN	L 0–21	
November 8	Central University	Chamberlain Field; Chattanooga, TN	W 27–8	
November 14	at Maryville (TN)	Maryville, TN	W 14–7	
November 27	Georgetown (KY)	Chamberlain Field; Chattanooga, TN	W 55–6	
