= 1913 Maryland Aggies football team =

American college football season

1913 Maryland Aggies football

Maryland state champion
- Conference: Independent
- Record: 6–3
- Head coach: Curley Byrd (3rd season)
- Captain: Country Morris

1913 Southern college football independents records
	Conf.			Overall
Team	W	L	T	W		L		T
Stetson		–		3	–	0	–	0
Western Kentucky State Normal		–		1	–	0	–	0
Navy		–		7	–	1	–	1
VMI		–		7	–	1	–	2
Louisville		–		5	–	1	–	0
Middle Tennessee State Normal		–		5	–	1	–	1
Arkansas		–		7	–	2	–	0
Oklahoma		–		6	–	2	–	0
Kendall		–		5	–	2	–	0
Sam Houston Normal		–		3	–	1	–	1
TCU		–		5	–	2	–	1
Furman		–		6	–	3	–	0
Maryland		–		6	–	3	–	0
Ole Miss		–		6	–	3	–	1
Presbyterian		–		5	–	3	–	0
Howard (AL)		–		5	–	3	–	1
Richmond		–		5	–	3	–	1
Chattanooga		–		4	–	3	–	0
Oklahoma A&M		–		4	–	3	–	0
South Carolina		–		4	–	3	–	0
Southern College		–		1	–	1	–	0
Polytechnic (TX)		–		2	–	2	–	4
Southwestern Louisiana Industrial		–		4	–	4	–	0
Southwest Texas State		–		4	–	4	–	0
Spring Hill		–		3	–	3	–	0
West Virginia		–		3	–	4	–	2
Louisiana Industrial		–		3	–	4	–	1
Marshall		–		3	–	4	–	0
Delaware		–		2	–	4	–	2
Catholic University		–		1	–	4	–	1
Davidson		–		2	–	5	–	0
Mississippi Normal		–		1	–	5	–	1
West Tennessee State Normal		–		1	–	2	–	0
North Texas State Normal		–		0	–	1	–	0
Birmingham		–		0	–	5	–	0
Wake Forest		–		0	–	8	–	0

The 1913 Maryland Aggies football team was an American football team that represented the Maryland Agricultural College (which became Maryland State College in 1916 and part of the University of Maryland in 1920) as an independent during the 1913 college football season. In their third season under head coach Curley Byrd, the Aggies compiled a 6–3 record, shut out five of nine opponents, and outscored all opponents by a total of 184 to 139. The team's three losses were to Navy (0–76), Gallaudet (0–26), and Pennsylvania Military (7–27).

Halfback William "Country" Morris was the team captain.

== Schedule ==
Date	Opponent	Site	Result	Attendance	Source
September 27	Baltimore City College	College Park, MD	W 27–10		
October 4	Richmond	College Park, MD	W 45–0		
October 11	at Johns Hopkins	Homewood Field; Baltimore, MD	W 26–0		
October 18	Western Maryland	College Park, MD	W 46–0		
October 25	at Navy	Annapolis, MD	L 0–76		
November 8	at St. John's (MD)	Annapolis, MD	W 13–0		
November 14	Washington College	College Park, MD	W 20–0		
November 22	Gallaudet	College Park, MD	L 0–26		
November 27	at Pennsylvania Military	Chester, PA	L 7–27		
