= Norman C. Paine =

American collegiate coach (1893–1955)

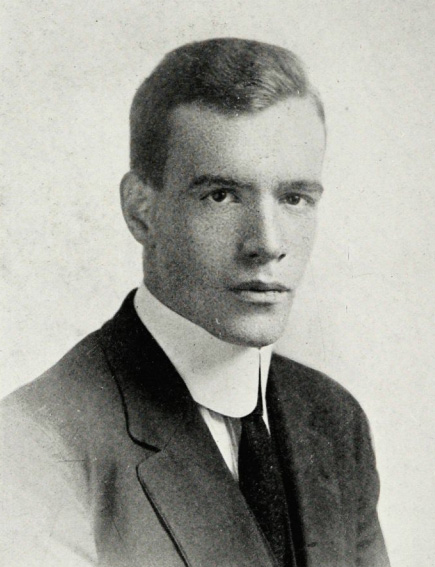
- Paine pictured in The Round-Up 1914, Baylor yearbook

Biographical details
- Born: January 6, 1893; Chicago, Illinois, U.S.
- Died: February 13, 1955 (aged 62); Los Angeles, California, U.S.

Playing career

Football
- c. 1910: Chicago

Basketball
- c. 1910: Chicago
- Positions: Guard, halfback, quarterback (football)

Coaching career (HC unless noted)

Football
- 1913–1915: Baylor
- 1917–1918: Arkansas
- 1920: Iowa State

Basketball
- 1913–1914: Baylor

Administrative career (AD unless noted)
- 1913–1914: Baylor

Head coaching record
- Overall: 16–11–3 (football); 1–8 (basketball)

Norman Carr Paine (January 6, 1893 – February 13, 1955) was an American college football and college basketball player and coach, athletics administrator, and physician. He served as the head football coach at Baylor University (1913), the University of Arkansas (1917–1918), and Iowa State University (1920), compiling a career college football head coaching record of 16–11–3. Paine was also the head basketball coach at Baylor during the 1913–14 season, tallying a mark of 1–8. He was the athletic director at Baylor from 1913 to 1914. Paine later practiced medicine in Los Angeles County, California.

== Early life and playing career ==
Paine was a native of Chicago, Illinois. He attended Wendell Phillips Academy High School and played football there as a tackle. He then moved on to the University of Chicago, where he played for the Chicago Maroons football team under Amos Alonzo Stagg. In his first year at the university, Paine played as a guard on the freshman football team. He made the varsity football team as sophomore and played guard and defensive halfback. As a junior and senior he was the starting quarterback for the Maroons. Paine was also a member of the Chicago Maroons men's basketball team.

== Coaching career ==
Paine was the head football coach at Baylor University in 1913. His record there stands at 4–4–2. From 1917 to 1918, he served as the head coach at the University of Arkansas, posting an 8–3–1 record. In 1920, he served as the coach at Iowa State University posting a 4–4 record.

== Medical career and later life ==
Paine graduated from Rush Medical College and was the head of the campus infirmary at Iowa State as well as the football coach. Paine was on the national board of the YMCA, served Los Angeles County Hospital for 30 years and was a physician in Glendale, California. Paine was an honored alumni of the University of Chicago and headed the Big Ten Club of Southern California and the Quarterbacks Club. He hosted several Big Ten Conference coaches during Rose Bowl appearances.

== Head coaching record ==
=== Football ===
Year	Team	Overall	Conference	Standing	Bowl/playoffs
Baylor (Independent) (1913)
1913	Baylor	4–4–2			
Baylor:		4–4–2			
Arkansas Razorbacks (Southwest Conference) (1917–1918)
1917	Arkansas	5–1–1	0–1–1	6th	
1918	Arkansas	3–2	0–1	6th	
Arkansas:		8–3–1	0–2–1		
Iowa State Cyclones (Missouri Valley Intercollegiate Athletic Association) (1920)
1920	Iowa State	4–4	3–2	T–3rd	
Iowa State:		4–4	3–2		
Total:		16–11–3			
