= 1913 Wake Forest Baptists football team =

American college football season

1913 Wake Forest Baptists football
- Conference: Independent
- Record: 0–8
- Head coach: Frank Thompson (3rd season)
- Captain: Paul C. Carter

1913 Southern college football independents records
	Conf.			Overall
Team	W	L	T	W		L		T
Stetson		–		3	–	0	–	0
Western Kentucky State Normal		–		1	–	0	–	0
Navy		–		7	–	1	–	1
VMI		–		7	–	1	–	2
Louisville		–		5	–	1	–	0
Middle Tennessee State Normal		–		5	–	1	–	1
Arkansas		–		7	–	2	–	0
Oklahoma		–		6	–	2	–	0
Kendall		–		5	–	2	–	0
Sam Houston Normal		–		3	–	1	–	1
TCU		–		5	–	2	–	1
Furman		–		6	–	3	–	0
Maryland		–		6	–	3	–	0
Ole Miss		–		6	–	3	–	1
Presbyterian		–		5	–	3	–	0
Howard (AL)		–		5	–	3	–	1
Richmond		–		5	–	3	–	1
Chattanooga		–		4	–	3	–	0
Oklahoma A&M		–		4	–	3	–	0
South Carolina		–		4	–	3	–	0
Southern College		–		1	–	1	–	0
Polytechnic (TX)		–		2	–	2	–	4
Southwestern Louisiana Industrial		–		4	–	4	–	0
Southwest Texas State		–		4	–	4	–	0
Spring Hill		–		3	–	3	–	0
West Virginia		–		3	–	4	–	2
Louisiana Industrial		–		3	–	4	–	1
Marshall		–		3	–	4	–	0
Delaware		–		2	–	4	–	2
Catholic University		–		1	–	4	–	1
Davidson		–		2	–	5	–	0
Mississippi Normal		–		1	–	5	–	1
West Tennessee State Normal		–		1	–	2	–	0
North Texas State Normal		–		0	–	1	–	0
Birmingham		–		0	–	5	–	0
Wake Forest		–		0	–	8	–	0

The 1913 Wake Forest Baptists football team was an American football team that represented Wake Forest College (now known as Wake Forest University) as an independent during the 1913 college football season. In their third year under head coach Frank Thompson, the team compiled an 0–8 record.

== Schedule ==
Date	Opponent	Site	Result	Source
September 27	at North Carolina	Campus Athletic Field; Chapel Hill, NC (rivalry)	L 0–7	
October 11	at South Carolina	Davis Field; Columbia, SC	L 10–27	
October 18	Richmond	Wake Forest, NC	L 13–14	
October 25	at Washington and Lee	Wilson Field; Lexington, VA	L 0–33	
November 1	at North Carolina A&M	Riddick Stadium; Raleigh, NC (rivalry)	L 0–37	
November 8	Gallaudet	Wake Forest, NC	L 7–47	
November 15	vs. North Carolina	East Durham Ballpark; Durham, NC	L 0–29	
November 27	vs. Davidson	Wearn Field; Charlotte, NC	L 0–6	
