= 1913 Richmond Spiders football team =

American college football season

1913 Richmond Spiders football

EVIAA champion
- Conference: Eastern Virginia Intercollegiate Athletic Association
- Record: 5–3–1 (3–0 EVIAA)
- Head coach: Frank Dobson (1st season)
- Captain: John A. George
- Home stadium: Broad Street Park

1913 Eastern Virginia Intercollegiate Athletic Association football standings
	Conf.					Overall
Team	W		L		T	W		L		T
Richmond $	3	–	0	–	0	5	–	3	–	1
Hampden–Sydney	2	–	1	–	0	3	–	6	–	0
Randolph–Macon	1	–	2	–	0	4	–	4	–	1
William & Mary	0	–	3	–	0	0	–	5	–	1
$ – Conference champion

The 1913 Richmond Spiders football team was an American football team that represented Richmond College—now known as the University of Richmond—as a member of the Eastern Virginia Intercollegiate Athletic Association (EVIAA) during the 1913 college football season. Led by first-year head coach Frank Dobson, Richmond compiled an overall record of 5–3–1 with a mark of 3–0 in conference play, winning the EVIAA title.

== Schedule ==
Date	Time	Opponent	Site	Result	Attendance	Source
September 27	3:30 p.m.	Richmond Blues*	Broad Street Park; Richmond, VA	T 0–0		
October 4		at Maryland*	College Park, MD	L 0–45		
October 11		Gallaudet*	Broad Street Park; Richmond, VA	L 0–6		
October 18		at Wake Forest*	Wake Forest, NC	W 14–13		
October 25		Randolph–Macon*	Broad Street Park; Richmond, VA	L 7–14		
November 1		Hampden–Sydney	Broad Street Park; Richmond, VA	W 21–20		
November 8		vs. William & Mary*	Horwitz Park; Newport News, VA (rivalry)	W 20–13	1,000	
November 15		Randolph–Macon	Broad Street Park; Richmond, VA	W 20–18	4,000	
November 22		at William & Mary	Williamsburg, VA	W 20–13		
*Non-conference game
