= 1913 Creighton Blue and White football team =

American college football season

1913 Creighton Blue and White football
- Conference: Independent
- Record: 4–3–1
- Head coach: Harry Miller (4th season)
- Home stadium: Creighton Field

1913 Midwestern college football independents records
	Conf.			Overall
Team	W	L	T	W		L		T
Michigan Agricultural		–		7	–	0	–	0
Notre Dame		–		7	–	0	–	0
Western State Normal		–		4	–	0	–	0
Haskell		–		10	–	1	–	0
Michigan		–		6	–	1	–	0
Lake Forest		–		5	–	1	–	1
Doane		–		5	–	1	–	2
St. Mary's (OH)		–		4	–	1	–	1
Christian Brothers (MO)		–		6	–	2	–	1
Wabash		–		5	–	2	–	0
Detroit		–		5	–	3	–	1
Heidelberg		–		4	–	3	–	0
Marquette		–		4	–	3	–	1
Mount Union		–		4	–	3	–	2
Saint Louis		–		5	–	4	–	1
Lincoln (MO)		–		1	–	1	–	0
South Dakota		–		3	–	3	–	0
Northern Illinois State		–		3	–	3	–	3
Akron		–		3	–	4	–	0
Iowa State Teachers		–		2	–	3	–	1
Ohio Northern		–		4	–	6	–	1
Butler		–		2	–	4	–	1
Michigan State Normal		–		2	–	3	–	1
North Dakota Agricultural		–		0	–	2	–	2

The 1913 Creighton Blue and White football team represented Creighton University as an independent during the 1913 college football season. Led by fourth-year head coach Harry Miller, the Blue and White compiled a record of 4–3–1 . The team played home games at Creighton Field in Omaha, Nebraska.

== Schedule ==
Date	Opponent	Site	Result	Source
October 4	Kearney Normal	Omaha, NE	T 7–7	
October 11	at Nebraska Wesleyan	Lincoln, NE	W 7–0	
October 18	Marquette	Creighton Field; Omaha, NE	W 13–6	
October 25	Bellevue (NE)	Omaha, NE	W 88–0	
November 1	Haskell	Omaha, NE	L 0–7	
November 15	Omaha	Creighton Field; Omaha, NE	W 128–0	
November 22	South Dakota	Omaha, NE	L 0–17	
Unknown	Amity College (IA)		W 3–0	
