= List of Wabash Little Giants head football coaches =

The Wabash Little Giants football program is a college football team that represents Wabash College in the North Coast Athletic Conference, a part of the NCAA Division III. The team has had 34 head coaches since its first recorded football game in 1884. The current coach is Jake Gilbert who first took the position for the 2025 season.

== Key ==
Key to symbols in coaches list
General		Overall		Conference		Postseason (Note: Although the first Rose Bowl Game was played in 1902, it has been continuously played since the 1916 game, and is recognized as the oldest bowl game by the NCAA. "—" indicates any season prior to 1916 when postseason games were not played.)	
No.	Order of coaches (Note: A running total of the number of head coaches, with coaches who served separate tenures being counted only once. Interim head coaches are represented with "Int" and are not counted in the running total. "—" indicates the team played but either without a coach or no coach is on record. "X" indicates an interim year without play.)	GC	Games coached	CW	Conference wins	PW	Postseason wins
DC	Division championships	OW	Overall wins	CL	Conference losses	PL	Postseason losses
CC	Conference championships	OL	Overall losses	CT	Conference ties	PT	Postseason ties
NC	National championships	OT	Overall ties (Note: Overtime rules in college football were introduced in 1996, making ties impossible in the period since.)	C%	Conference winning percentage		
†	Elected to the College Football Hall of Fame	O%	Overall winning percentage (Note: When computing the win–loss percentage, a tie counts as half a win and half a loss.)				

== Coaches ==
No.	Name	Term	GC	OW	OL	OT	O%	CW	CL	CT	C%	PW	PL	CCs	Awards
1	Edwin R. Taber	1884	1	1	0	0	1.000	—	—	—	—	—	—	—	—
2	Evans Woollen	1886	3	2	0	1	.833	—	—	—	—	—	—	—	—
3	William K. Martin	1887	1	0	1	0	.000	—	—	—	—	—	—	—	—
4	C. Sherman King	1889	2	1	1	0	.500	—	—	—	—	—	—	—	—
5	Robert A. King	1890	3	0	3	0	.000	—	—	—	—	—	—	—	—
6	Mason B. Thomas	1891	4	1	3	0	.250	—	—	—	—	—	—	—	—
7	William C. Malley	1892	5	1	4	0	.200	—	—	—	—	—	—	—	—
8	Elmer G. Horton	1893	6	3	3	0	.500	—	—	—	—	—	—	—	—
9	A. Vernon Randall	1894	9	4	5	0	.444	—	—	—	—	—	—	—	—
10	Frank D. Arms	1895	9	6	3	0	.667	—	—	—	—	—	—	—	—
11	Frank M. Gould	1896	7	3	4	0	.429	—	—	—	—	—	—	—	—
12	James B. Modesitt	1898–1899	10	3	5	2	.400	—	—	—	—	—	—	—	—
13	Anthony Chez	1900	9	5	4	0	.556	—	—	—	—	—	—	—	—
14	Frederick Feil	1901	11	4	7	0	.364	—	—	—	—	—	—	—	—
15	Ebin Wilson	1902–1903	20	11	7	2	.600	—	—	—	—	—	—	—	—
16	Frank Cayou	1904–1907	34	20	13	1	.603	—	—	—	—	—	—	—	—
17	Ralph Jones	1908	8	2	6	0	.250	—	—	—	—	—	—	—	—
18	Jesse Harper	1909–1912	26	15	9	2	.615	—	—	—	—	—	—	—	—
19	Clarence H. Thurber	1913–1914	14	7	6	1	.536	—	—	—	—	—	—	—	—
20	Paul Sheeks	1915–1916	17	14	2	1	.853	—	—	—	—	—	—	—	—
21	J. Russell Townsend	1917–1918	12	2	9	1	.208	—	—	—	—	—	—	—	—
22	Robert E. Vaughan	1919–1945	224	115	85	24	.567	—	—	—	—	—	—	—	—
23	Glen Harmeson	1946–1950	41	25	10	6	.683	—	—	—	—	—	—	—	—
24	Garland Frazier	1951–1960	89	48	35	6	.573	—	—	—	—	—	—	—	—
25	Kenneth W. Keuffel	1961–1966	53	28	20	5	.575	—	—	—	—	—	—	—	—
26	Max Urick	1967–1970	35	11	22	2	.343	—	—	—	—	—	—	—	—
27	Dick Bowman	1971–1973	30	14	16	0	.467	—	—	—	—	—	—	—	—
28	Frank Navarro	1974–1977	43	26	17	0	.605	—	—	—	—	—	—	—	—
29	Stan Parrish	1978–1982	46	42	3	1	.924	—	—	—	—	—	—	—	—
30	Greg Carlson	1983–2000	171	112	57	2	.661	—	—	—	—	—	—	—	—
31	Chris Creighton	2001–2007	78	63	15	0	.808	—	—	—	—	—	—	—	—
32	Erik Raeburn	2008–2015	91	78	13	0	.857	—	—	—	—	—	—	—	—
33	Don Morel	2016–2024	81	61	20	0	.753	—	—	—	—	—	—	—	—
34	Jake Gilbert	2025–present	12	9	3	0	.750	—	—	—	—	—	—	—	—
