= 1913 Michigan Wolverines football team =

American college football season

1913 Michigan Wolverines football
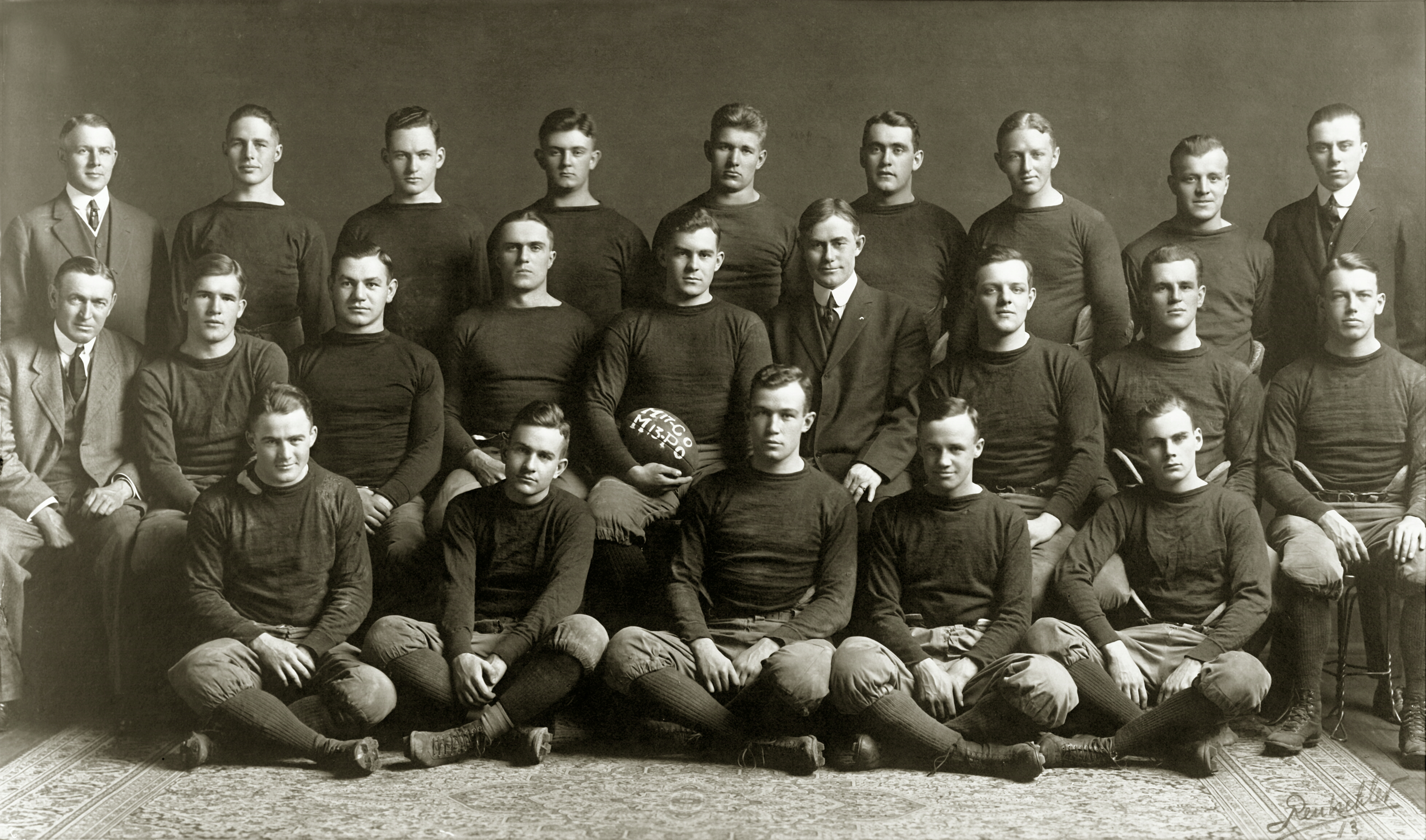
- Conference: Independent
- Record: 6–1
- Head coach: Fielding H. Yost (13th season)
- MVP: James B. Craig
- Captain: George C. Paterson
- Home stadium: Ferry Field

Uniform
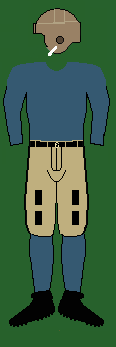

1913 Midwestern college football independents records
| | Conf. | | | Overall |
| Team | W | L | T | W | | L | | T |
|---|---|---|---|---|---|---|---|---|
| Michigan Agricultural | | – | | 7 | – | 0 | – | 0 |
| Notre Dame | | – | | 7 | – | 0 | – | 0 |
| Western State Normal | | – | | 4 | – | 0 | – | 0 |
| Haskell | | – | | 10 | – | 1 | – | 0 |
| Michigan | | – | | 6 | – | 1 | – | 0 |
| Lake Forest | | – | | 5 | – | 1 | – | 1 |
| Doane | | – | | 5 | – | 1 | – | 2 |
| St. Mary's (OH) | | – | | 4 | – | 1 | – | 1 |
| Christian Brothers (MO) | | – | | 6 | – | 2 | – | 1 |
| Wabash | | – | | 5 | – | 2 | – | 0 |
| Detroit | | – | | 5 | – | 3 | – | 1 |
| Heidelberg | | – | | 4 | – | 3 | – | 0 |
| Marquette | | – | | 4 | – | 3 | – | 1 |
| Mount Union | | – | | 4 | – | 3 | – | 2 |
| Saint Louis | | – | | 5 | – | 4 | – | 1 |
| Lincoln (MO) | | – | | 1 | – | 1 | – | 0 |
| South Dakota | | – | | 3 | – | 3 | – | 0 |
| Northern Illinois State | | – | | 3 | – | 3 | – | 3 |
| Akron | | – | | 3 | – | 4 | – | 0 |
| Iowa State Teachers | | – | | 2 | – | 3 | – | 1 |
| Ohio Northern | | – | | 4 | – | 6 | – | 1 |
| Butler | | – | | 2 | – | 4 | – | 1 |
| Michigan State Normal | | – | | 2 | – | 3 | – | 1 |
| North Dakota Agricultural | | – | | 0 | – | 2 | – | 2 |

The 1913 Michigan Wolverines football team represented the University of Michigan as an independent during the 1913 college football season. The season was Fielding H. Yost's 13th as Michigan's head football coach. The team compiled a record of 6–1, outscored opponents 175 to 21, and shut out four opponents while giving up an average of only three points per game.

After opening the season with wins against two Ohio colleges (Case and Mt. Union), the Wolverines lost to Michigan Agricultural College (now known as Michigan State University) by a score of 12–7. It was Michigan's first loss in the history of its cross-state rivalry with the East Lansing institution. Following the loss to the Aggies, star halfback Jimmy Craig, who had decided to quit playing football, returned to the team upon "urgent pleading by the entire student body." In his season debut, Craig scored four touchdowns in the first half. Though he played in only two-and-a-half games in 1913, Craig scored seven touchdowns and received consensus All-American honors, including a first-team selection by Walter Camp.

During its decade-long absence from the Western Conference, Michigan played inter-sectional rivalry games against Penn (12 games in 12 years from 1906 to 1917), Syracuse (10 games from 1908 to 1918), Cornell (7 games from 1911 to 1917), and Vanderbilt (7 games from 1905 to 1914). In the final month of the season, Michigan defeated its four inter-sectional rivals by a combined score of 106 to 9. Ohio State joined the Western Conference in 1913 and was barred by a Conference rule from playing Michigan. For this reason, there was a hiatus in the Michigan–Ohio State football rivalry from 1913 to 1917.

Craig and tackle Miller Pontius were both selected as consensus first-team All-Americans. Two other players received first-team All-American honors from at least one selector. They were center and team captain George "Bubbles" Paterson, and quarterback Tommy Hughitt.

== Schedule ==
| Date | Opponent | Site | Result | Attendance |
|---|---|---|---|---|
| October 4 | Case | Ferry Field; Ann Arbor, MI | W 48–0 | 5,746 |
| October 11 | Mount Union | Ferry Field; Ann Arbor, MI | W 14–0 | 3,971 |
| October 18 | Michigan Agricultural | Ferry Field; Ann Arbor, MI (rivalry) | L 7–12 | 8,509 |
| October 25 | at Vanderbilt | Dudley Field; Nashville, TN | W 33–2 | 3,417 |
| November 1 | Syracuse | Ferry Field; Ann Arbor, MI | W 43–7 | 8,491 |
| November 8 | at Cornell | Percy Field; Ithaca, NY | W 17–0 | 6,827 |
| November 15 | Penn^{†} | Ferry Field; Ann Arbor, MI | W 13–0 | 19,687 |
^{†}Homecoming

== Season summary ==
=== Pre-season ===
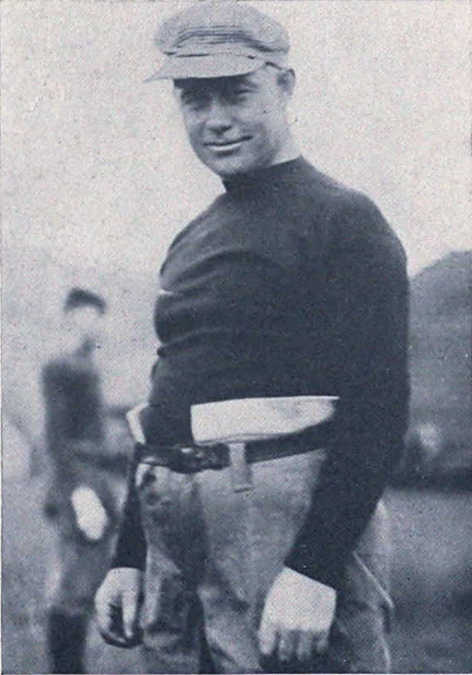
Comments about Fielding H. Yost's "brain storms" drew the ire of his players.

Prior to the start of the 1913 football season, expectations for Michigan were uncertain. In mid-August, head coach Fielding H. Yost sent invitations to 33 players to participate in training camp. At the time, the Detroit Free Press wrote that "Chef Yost has started to mix the ingredients for the 1913 dish he will offer to college fans." The core of Michigan's line was expected be strong with the return of five varsity letter winners: Miller Pontius at right tackle, George "Bubbles" Patterson at center, Ernest "Aqua" Allmendinger at right guard, and James Musser at left tackle. Pontius had played mostly as an end in 1912 and was anxious to move to tackle where he "puts up his best game." At the end position, Roy "Squib" Torbet also returned from the 1912 team.

The experience in the line contrasted with inexperience in the backfield. The Wolverines were starting from scratch with the loss of all four backfield starters from the 1912 team. Jimmy Craig had been the star halfback for Michigan in 1911 and 1912 and was also the 1912 intercollegiate hurdles champion. (His older brother, Ralph Craig, was a track star at the University of Michigan who won gold medals in the 100 and 200-meter events at the 1912 Olympics in Stockholm, Sweden.) In August 1913, Craig announced that he would no longer play football. Craig said he needed to drop athletics or fall behind in his university courses. Another reason given for the decision was a bad knee. Others speculated that Craig decided not to play, because he was not selected as captain of the 1913 team.

Also gone from Michigan's backfield were quarterback Herbert "Hub" Huebel, fullback George Thomson, and halfback/end Otto Carpell. Tommy Hughitt was the only backfield veteran, having started three games at halfback in 1912. Hughitt, who later became a star in the early days of professional football, became the starting quarterback in 1913.

Training camp began in mid-September. Having abandoned his earlier practice of holding training camp at Whitmore Lake, Yost conducted training camp out of a new club house at Ferry Field. Yost subjected his players to more strenuous drills each day, supplementing the drills "with work at the 'bucking machine' and the tackling dummy."

In late September, an article asserting that Coach Yost was "subject to brain storms" appeared in Harper's Weekly, drawing a response of anger and "healthy disgust" from Yost's players who "insist that their coach has never had a brain storm in his life." The article was written by Herbert Reed and said of Yost:

"The attitude of Fielding H. Yost at Michigan should be one of the interesting features of the season, for Yost is temperamentally a 'chance-taker.' Unlike most extremists, his 'brain storms' have met with more frequent reward. It must not be inferred from this, however, that Yost does not know the game from the ground up – merely that any move he makes is absorbingly interesting for the reason that something fancy is apt to develop from it without notice to or benefit of clergy for his opponent. The more startling type of play usually comes out of the West, anyway; for the Westerners like shortcuts to victory."

Four days before the season opener, a scrimmage between the first team and the scrubs resulted in a story in the Detroit Free Press under the headline, "Gloom in the Camp of Yost." In the hour-long scrimmage, the first team was unable to score and lost to the scrubs, 3–0. The Free Press opined that it was "easily the most discouraging work yet seen on Ferry Field" and resulted not from being outplayed by the scrubs, but from the fact that the first team players "just weren't good enough to score."

=== Week 1: Case ===
Week 1: Case at Michigan

| Team | 1 | 2 | 3 | 4 | Total |
|---|---|---|---|---|---|
| Case | 0 | 0 | 0 | 0 | 0 |
| • Michigan | 13 | 21 | 14 | 0 | 48 |

- Date: October 4, 1913
- Location: Ferry Field
  Ann Arbor, Michigan
- Game attendance: 5,746
- Referee: Hoagland (Princeton)

Michigan opened its season on October 4, 1913, with a 48–0 victory over Case School of Applied Science. (Michigan opened its season with a home game against Case 16 times between 1902 and 1923.) After taking a 34–0 lead at halftime, Coach Yost played his second-string players in the second half. The highlight of the game was a 45-yard touchdown return by 200-pound center George "Bubbles" Paterson after intercepting a Cornell pass. Other highlights included a pair of 60-yard runs by left halfback James Catlett. Michigan's offense consisted of "straight football" with only one pass being attempted in the game.

Michigan's starting lineup against Case was Torbet (left end), Musser (left tackle), Lichtner (left guard), Paterson (center), Allmendinger (right guard), Pontius (right tackle), Lyons (right end), Hughitt (quarterback), Catlett (left halfback), Bentley (right halfback), and Galt (fullback). Players appearing in the game as substitutes were Tessin, Raynsford, Morse, Cochran, Millard, James, Watson, Roehm, Quinn, and Diehl. The game was played in 10-minute quarters.

=== Week 2: Mt. Union ===
Week 2: Mt. Union at Michigan

| Team | 1 | 2 | 3 | 4 | Total |
|---|---|---|---|---|---|
| Mt. Union | 0 | 0 | 0 | 0 | 0 |
| • Michigan | 0 | 14 | 0 | 0 | 14 |

- Date: October 11, 1913
- Location: Ferry Field
  Ann Arbor, Michigan
- Game attendance: 3,971
- Referee: Holderness (Lehigh)

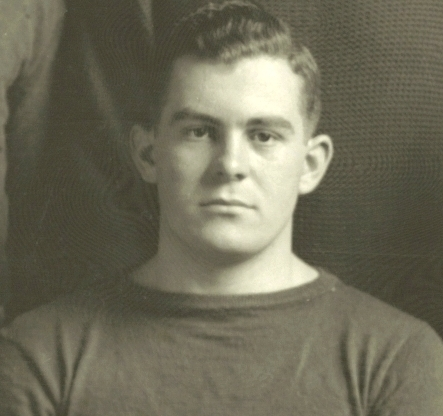
Team captain George "Bubbles" Paterson

In its second game, Michigan played Mt. Union in the first meeting between the two programs. The game was a late addition to the schedule and was "intended as a practice tilt." Although Michigan won the game, 14–0, the Mt. Union team was praised for holding the Wolverines to only 14 points. The Detroit Free Press wrote:

"Up from a small, hitherto unknown college in Ohio came eleven husky, scrappy football players today and for over one hour on Ferry field they furnished the proud Wolverines with a battle for gridiron honors which put the name of Mt. Union college on the football map for many years to come."

Early in the second quarter, Michigan penetrated deep into Mt. Union territory on a drive that featured end runs of 25 and 20 yards by James Catlett and a forward pass from Tommy Hughitt to John Lyons at the four-yard line. With first down at the Mt. Union four-yard line, it took four attempts before Hughitt scored the touchdown. George Paterson kicked the extra point. The Wolverines scored again in the second quarter on a drive that was aided by a pass interference penalty against Mt. Union. After the penalty, the ball was placed at Mt. Union's three-yard line, and Leland Benton ran for the touchdown. Paterson again kicked the extra point. At halftime, Coach Yost denied his players the usual rubdowns in the field house and instead kept them on the field for a heated lecture. Despite the halftime prodding, the Wolverines were unable to score in the second half, and the game ended with Michigan ahead, 14–0.

Michigan's starting lineup against Mt. Union was Torbet (left end), Musser (left tackle), Traphagen (left guard), Paterson (center), Allmendinger (right guard), Pontius (right tackle), Lyons (right end), Hughitt (quarterback), Galt (left halfback), Catlett (right halfback), and Benton(fullback). The only substitution for Michigan was Quinn, replacing an injured Catlett at right halfback during the first quarter. The game was played in 12-1/2-minute and 10-minute quarters.

=== Week 3: Michigan Agricultural ===
Week 3: Michigan Agricultural at Michigan

| Team | 1 | 2 | 3 | 4 | Total |
|---|---|---|---|---|---|
| • Michigan Agricultural | 6 | 0 | 6 | 0 | 12 |
| Michigan | 0 | 0 | 0 | 7 | 7 |

- Date: October 18, 1913
- Location: Ferry Field
  Ann Arbor, Michigan
- Referee: Hoagland (Princeton)

For its third game, Michigan played the Aggies from Michigan Agricultural College (now known as Michigan State University). The Wolverines played without its starting left halfback, Martin Galt. Galt was injured in the Mt. Union game. For the first time in the history of the intrastate rivalry, the Aggies beat the Wolverines, 12–7. The Aggies' offense, led by fullback "Carp" Julian, scored touchdowns in the first and third quarters, but missed both extra points. Halfback Miller returned a Michigan fumble 45 yards for the one touchdown, and the other score came on a long drive. An account of the game noted: "The one great feature of the game was the accuracy of the Aggies forward passing which netted a total of 76 yards for the Farmers." Trailing 12–0 at the start of the fourth quarter, the Wolverines rallied in the fourth quarter. Clyde Bastian recovered an M.A.C. fumble at midfield and returned it 45 yards for a touchdown, and George Paterson kicked the extra point, cutting the lead to five points. Late in the fourth quarter, Michigan opened up its offense and drove to the Aggies' 35-yard line. A long forward pass to the goal line fell incomplete, and the game came to an end. The New York Times described the game as "a desperate gruelling struggle." M.A.C. halfback Blake Miller suffered a blow to the head during the game and was hospitalized in serious condition.

In November 1913, The Michigan Alumnus made note of the Aggies' potential as an athletic threat: "This victory with the football tie in 1908, and the Farmers' clean sweep in baseball in 1912, point to the fact that M.A.C. will bear watching by Michigan." In the celebration following the game, two Aggies fans were arrested and jailed for "throwing bottles about the streets" in the early hours of Sunday morning.

Michigan's starting lineup against the Aggies was Torbet (left end), Musser (left tackle), Traphagen (left guard), Paterson (center), Allmendinger (right guard), Raynford (right tackle), Lyons (right end), Hughitt (quarterback), Catlett (left halfback), Bentley (right halfback), and Pontius (fullback). Players appearing in the game as substitutes were Lichtner, Roehm, and Bastian. The game was played in 12-minute quarters.

=== Week 4: at Vanderbilt ===
Week 4: Michigan at Vanderbilt

| Team | 1 | 2 | 3 | 4 | Total |
|---|---|---|---|---|---|
| • Michigan | 14 | 12 | 0 | 7 | 33 |
| Vanderbilt | 2 | 0 | 0 | 0 | 2 |

- Date: October 25, 1922
- Location: Dudley Field
  Nashville, Tennessee
- Game attendance: 3,417
- Referee: Horatio B. Hackett

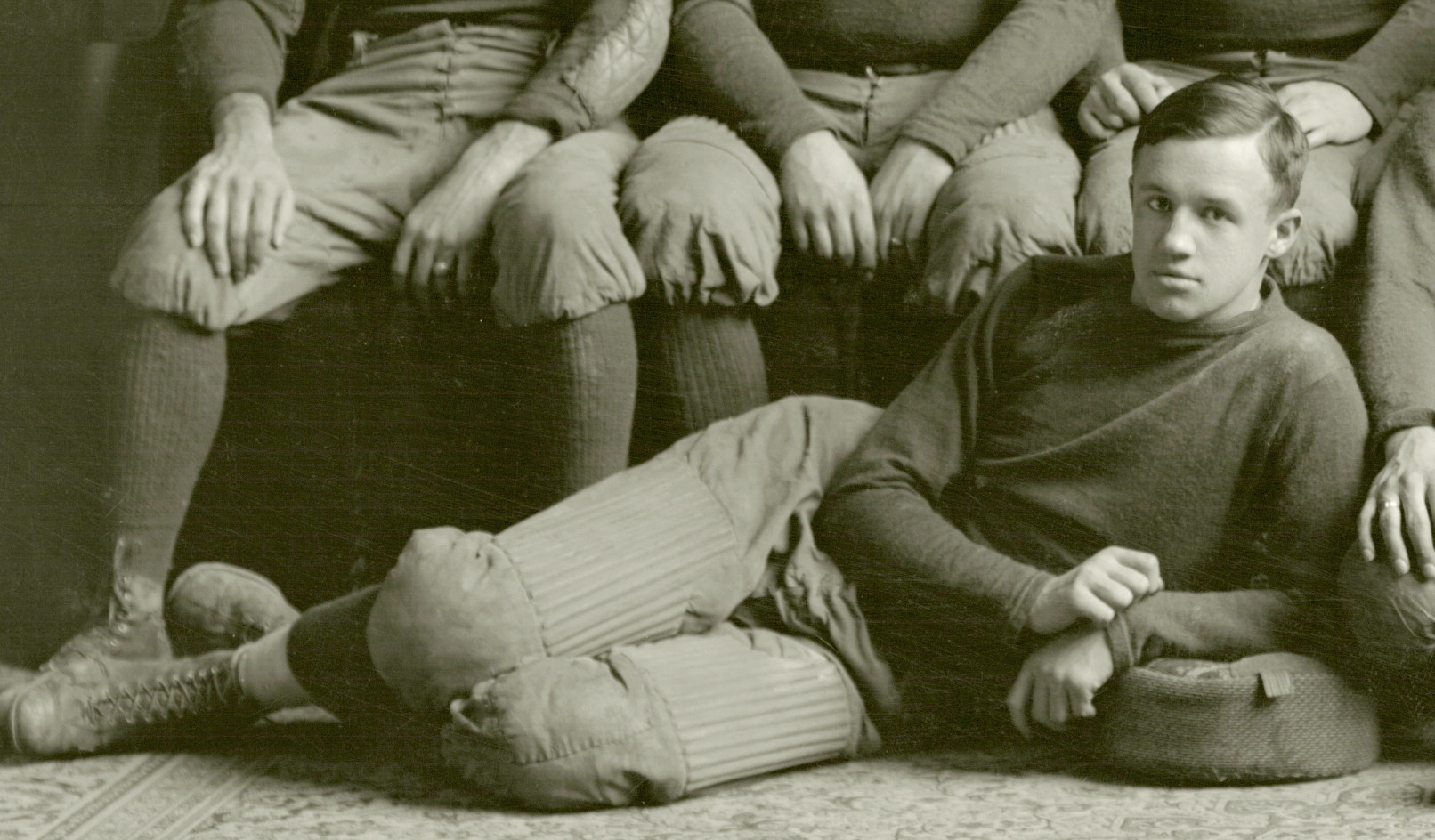
Quarterback Tommy Hughitt

On October 25, 1913, Michigan played Vanderbilt in Nashville, Tennessee. The game matched Michigan head coach Fielding H. Yost against his former player and brother-in-law, Dan McGugin. Owing to the relationship between Yost and McGugin, the two teams played nine times between 1905 and 1923, with Michigan winning eight times. Michigan won the 1913 game, 33–2, in the worst defeat for Vanderbilt since McGugin became the head coach. The game was marked by the Wolverines' most extensive use of the forward pass during the 1913 season. Michigan's air attack was described as showing "dazzling proficiency", as the forward passes were responsible for four of Michigan's five touchdowns. In the Detroit Free Press, E. A. Batchelor wrote: "Vanderbilt fairly gasped in amazement as the Wolverines shot the ball from one to another with the precision of baseball players."

Michigan touchdowns were scored by Cyril Quinn (2), Tommy Hughitt (2), and Martin Galt. George Paterson kicked three extra points. Vanderbilt's only points came late in the first quarter. A punt by Cyril Quinn was blocked by Tom Brown and bounced into the end zone. After a wild scramble, Clyde Bastian fell on the ball for a safety.

Michigan's starting lineup against Vanderbilt was Torbet (left end), Raynsford (left tackle), Traphagen (left guard), Paterson (center), Cochran (right guard), Pontius (right tackle), Lyons (right end), Hughitt (quarterback), Bastian (left halfback), Galt (right halfback), and Quinn (fullback). Players appearing in the game as substitutes included Lichtner, McHale, Allmendinger, James, Bushnell, Watson, Meade, Musser, and Bentley. The game consisted of 15-minute quarters. Willie Heston, who was a teammate of McGugin and star player for Michigan, served as the head linesman in the game.

=== Week 5: Syracuse ===
Week 5: Syracuse at Michigan

| Team | 1 | 2 | 3 | 4 | Total |
|---|---|---|---|---|---|
| • Michigan | 7 | 0 | 0 | 0 | 7 |
| Syracuse | 0 | 0 | 0 | 0 | 0 |

- Date: November 1, 1913
- Location: Ferry Field
  Ann Arbor, Michigan
- Game attendance: 8,491
- Referee: Haines (Yale)

On November 1, 1913, Michigan played Syracuse in Ann Arbor. After withdrawing from the Western Conference, Michigan developed annual rivalry games with a handful of Eastern teams. Accordingly, Michigan played Syracuse ten times from 1908 to 1918. Michigan won the 1913 game, 43–7.

The game marked the return of Jimmy Craig to the left halfback position for Michigan. After the loss to Michigan Agricultural College, "urgent pleading by the entire student body . . . induced him to re-enter the game." Against Syracuse, Craig immediately returned to 1912 form, scoring four touchdowns in the first half. To avoid injury, he was pulled from the game in the second quarter and did not play in the second half.

Michigan's starting lineup against Syracuse was Lichtner (left end), Musser (left tackle), Traphagen (left guard), Paterson (center), Allmendinger (right guard), Pontius (right tackle), Lyons (right end), Hughitt (quarterback), Craig (left halfback), Galt (right halfback), and Quinn (fullback). Players appearing in the game as substitutes included Tessin, Cochran, McHale, Raynsford, James, Bushnell, Catlett, Meade, Benton, and Bentley. The game consisted of 15-minute quarters.

=== Week 6: at Cornell ===
Week 6: Michigan at Cornell

| Team | 1 | 2 | 3 | 4 | Total |
|---|---|---|---|---|---|
| • Michigan | 7 | 0 | 10 | 0 | 17 |
| Cornell | 0 | 0 | 0 | 0 | 0 |

- Date: November 8, 1913
- Location: Percy Field
  Ithaca, New York
- Game attendance: 6,827
- Referee: Pendleton (Bowdoin)

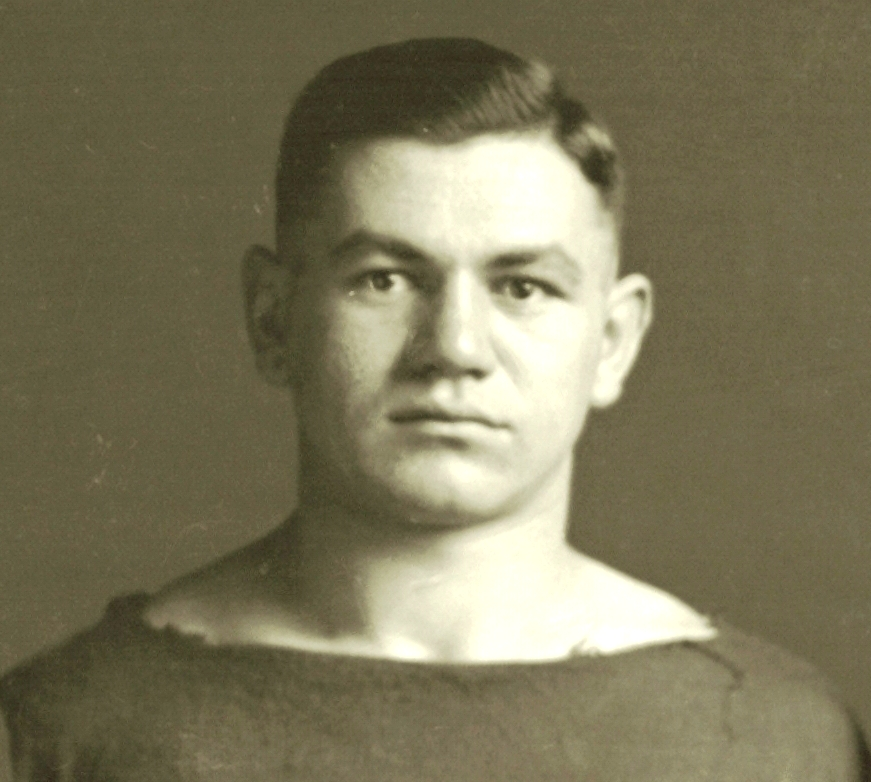
Right guard Ernest Allmendinger

On November 8, 1913, Michigan played Cornell at Percy Field in Ithaca, New York. The Wolverines traveled by train to Geneva, New York, where they stayed the night before the game. The game was the tenth meeting between the two programs, with Michigan having won two and lost eight of the prior games. One week earlier, Cornell had lost to Harvard, 23–6. As Harvard was considered the best football team in the East in 1913, Michigan's players hoped to defeat Cornell by an even larger margin. In the end, Michigan won by the same 17-point margin, 17–0.

In the first quarter, Michigan scored on a drive that featured a 35-yard gain on a forward pass from Tommy Hughitt to John Lyons. The Wolverines scored on a play in which most of the Michigan players ran to the left, and Jimmy Craig took a delayed pass from center and ran around the right end. George Paterson kicked the extra point. In the second quarter, two field goal attempts by Cornell were unsuccessful, and neither team scored. Cornell's right halfback Fritz fumbled the kickoff at the start of the second half, and Roy Torbet recovered for Michigan. After the Cornell defense held, Paterson kicked a field goal from the 26-yard line. On the Wolverines' next drive, Michigan drove 70 yards for a touchdown. The scoring drive featured a 45-yard run by Efton James on a fake forward pass. Hughitt ran for the touchdown, and Paterson again kicked the extra point. Neither team scored in the fourth quarter, though Craig gained 30 yards on a running play. After the game, a contingent of 300 Michigan fans "paraded and snake-danced" behind the Michigan band.

The New York Times reported that "Cornell was completely outplayed, outweighed, and outfought", and almost powerless against the "smashing onslaught of the Wolverines." In the Detroit Free Press, E. A. Batchelor wrote that Michigan had outplayed Cornell in every aspect of the game, except punting. Paterson was credited with playing the best game of his career, as he "roamed all over the field like a prowling beast of prey, tackling, blocking, making holes and in general performing splendid service." Ernest Allmendinger also won praise for his performance, with The New York Times crediting him with "a brilliant game on defense", and Batchelor describing him as "a snorting agent of destruction."

Michigan's starting lineup against Cornell was Torbet (left end), Musser (left tackle), Traphagen (left guard), Paterson (center), Allmendinger (right guard), Pontius (right tackle), Lyons (right end), Hughitt (quarterback), Craig (left halfback), Quinn (right halfback), and Galt (fullback). Players appearing in the game as substitutes included Lichtner, Raynsford, Cochran, James, and Bushnell. The game consisted of 15-minute quarters.

=== Week 7: Penn ===
Week 7: Penn at Michigan

| Team | 1 | 2 | 3 | 4 | Total |
|---|---|---|---|---|---|
| Penn | 0 | 0 | 0 | 0 | 0 |
| • Michigan | 7 | 6 | 0 | 0 | 13 |

- Date: November 15, 1913
- Location: Ferry Field
  Ann Arbor, Michigan
- Game attendance: 19,687
- Referee: Walter Eckersall (Chicago)

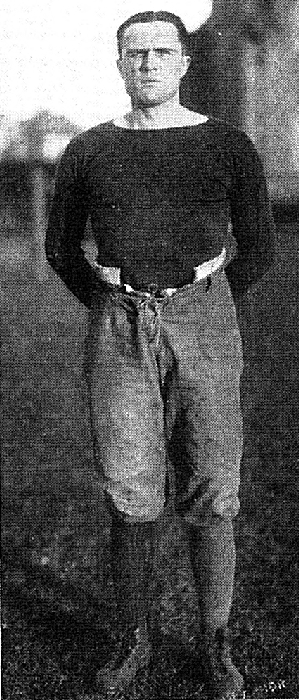
Consensus All-American Miller Pontius

Michigan concluded its 1913 season with a 14–0 victory over Penn. During the period of Michigan's withdrawal from the Western Conference, the Penn Quakers were Michigan's principal rival, playing each other every year from 1906 to 1917 (usually as the last game of the season).

The 1913 match between the Wolverines and Quakers was played in Ann Arbor. The night before the game, a mass meeting was held at Hill Auditorium featuring speeches by University President Harry Burns Hutchins, Coach Yost, and others. Highlights of the night included the debut of a new song called "Michigan Men of Steel" and the "new Hawaiian yell" which was "enthusiastically received." The game itself was played with wet snow falling at times and rain at other times. The Penn team did not appear at Ferry Field until 21 minutes after the scheduled start time, having failed to leave sufficient time for train travel between Detroit and Ann Arbor. A record crowd, estimated at 20,000 to 22,000, filled the grandstands and bleachers to capacity and watched as the Michigan band, "treading to strains of 'The Victors,' marched up and down the field and under the goal posts."

Although Michigan scored only 13 points, the Wolverines converted 14 first downs in the first half to only one for the Quakers. E. A. Batchelor wrote that the score concealed the decidedly one-sided nature of the game:

"If ever one football team smothered another, kicked it out of its boots, ground it into the mud, outfought it, outguessed it and outlasted it, Michigan did these things to the Quakers today. Not for one little moment were the easterners ever in the game."

The New York Times wrote that Michigan had "simply battered" the Penn defense and Penn's offense was at no time even dangerous. After the Penn game, Coach Yost declared 1913 "one of Michigan's greatest years." The 1913 Michiganensian (the University of Michigan yearbook) devoted four full pages to an account of the Penn game and concluded: "That glorious triumph will go down the vista of the years as one of the greatest and most satisfactory tributes paid to Yost genius, and the undying spirit at Michigan."

Playing in his third game of the 1913 season (and his last for Michigan), Jimmy Craig scored both of the Wolverines' touchdowns. The first touchdown was scored at the conclusion of an 82-yard drive in the first quarter. The drive consisted of "plunges and end runs" by Craig, Tommy Hughitt, and Martin Galt, and ended with Craig diving over the Penn line from the two-yard line. George Paterson kicked the extra point. In the second quarter, Michigan scored on another long drive featuring a long run by Craig and a 25-yard gain on "a circus catch" by John Lyons of a pass from Hughitt. Craig ran for the touchdown from the five-yard line, and Paterson's kick for the extra point hit the upright and bounced back onto the field.

During the second half, Michigan played a defensive strategy. The highlight of the second half came in the third quarter, after Craig intercepted a pass at midfield. On the ensuing drive, Craig ran 20 yards to the 27-yard line. On third down, the Wolverines set up in kick formation with Paterson lined up for an attempted field goal. Instead, Hughitt took the snap and ran 27 yards for an apparent touchdown. E. A. Batchelor described the play:

"The ball came back straight and true to Hughitt and Paterson advanced and kicked. But he kicked the empty air, for Tommy rose the minute he got his hands on the leather, and was off like a shot around Pennsy's right end. . . . Michigan's rooting section proceeded to do things which would cause an insane patient to get the straightjacket and padded cell, but the demonstration was premature."

The touchdown was nullified due to a holding penalty. The penalty occurred at a distance from Hughitt's run and was called on a Michigan player who slipped in the mud and grabbed Penn's center to hold himself steady. The Michigan Alumnus wrote that "one of the cleverest plays from placement formation that football followers have ever witnessed, went for naught."

Two days after the game, Batchelor reflected on the game and concluded that the victory was "a splendid example of what good coaching in the fundamentals of football will do for a team." He opined that the blocking was the best ever seen on Ferry Field and "as near perfect as anything in the line of football could be."

Michigan's starting lineup against Penn was Raynsford (left end), Musser (left tackle), Cochran (left guard), Paterson (center), Allmendinger (right guard), Pontius (right tackle), Lyons (right end), Hughitt (quarterback), Craig (left halfback), Galt (right halfback), and Torbet (fullback). Players appearing in the game as substitutes were McHale, Scott, Quinn, and Catlett. The game consisted of 15-minute quarters.

=== Western Conference overtures ===
In late 1912, Ohio State agreed to join the Western Conference starting in 1913. As a result, Ohio State would be barred by a Conference rule from playing Michigan (and the two teams did not play from 1913 to 1917). In November 1912, the Conference also formed a committee to confer with University of Michigan representatives about resuming its participation. The topic was a subject of considerable controversy during the 1913 football season. The Michigan Daily conducted a popular vote among students, faculty and alumni which produced results overwhelmingly opposed to the resumption of athletic relations with the Western Conference. The students voted 2,324-911 against the Conference, and the faculty also voted in opposition, though by a closer margin of 49–39. In mid-November 1913, the university's Board of Regents expressed its appreciation for the invitation to return to the Conference, but passed the following resolution: "Resolved: This Board deems inexpedient, under present conditions, a return of the University of Michigan to the Western Conference and deems undesirable the continued agitation of the subject on Campus."

=== Post-season ===
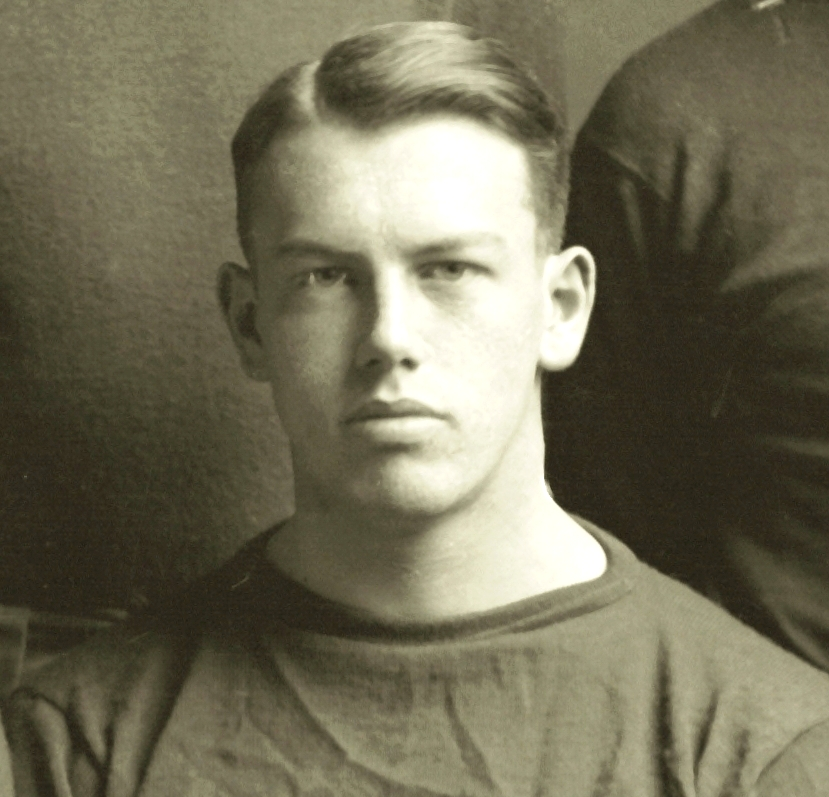
Consensus All-American Jimmy Craig

At the end of the season, two Michigan players, left halfback Jimmy Craig and tackle Miller Pontius, were consensus first-team All-Americans. Craig was selected despite playing in only two-and-a-half games, receiving the honors from, among others, Walter Camp in Collier's Weekly, Harper's Weekly, Frank G. Menke (sporting editor of the International News Service), Tom Thorp, and Fielding H. Yost for the Detroit Free Press. Craig was also awarded the Heston-Schulz Trophy as the most valuable player on Michigan's 1913 team. Pontius received first-team honors from Menke, Thorp, Yost, and Parke H. Davis. Quarterback Tommy Hughitt was the third Wolverine chosen by Coach Yost for his All-American team, and center George Paterson was selected as a first-team All-American by the Milwaukee Free Press.

One of the most promising signs during the 1913 season was the performance of the All-Freshman team coached by Prentiss Douglass. Led by John Maulbetsch, who would become a star for Michigan's varsity in 1914, the All-Freshman team compiled a record of 5–0 in games against Michigan State Normal School, Hillsdale College, Adrian College, the University of Detroit, and Alma College. The freshmen outscored their opponents 257 to 7.

== Players ==
=== Varsity letter winners ===
| Player | Position | Games started | Hometown | Height | Weight | Class | Prior experience |
|---|---|---|---|---|---|---|---|
| Ernest Allmendinger | Guard | 6 | | | | | |
| Thomas H. Bushnell, Jr. | | | | | | | |
| James Bland Catlett | Halfback | 3 | Brookings, South Dakota | | | | |
| William D. Cochran | Guard | 2 | | | | | |
| James B. Craig | Halfback | 3 | | | | | |
| Martin H. Galt | Halfback | 6 | Shenandoah, Iowa | | | | |
| Ernest Hughitt | Quarterback | 7 | | | | | |
| Efton M. James | | | | | | | |
| Henry W. Lichtner | End, Guard | 3 | | | | | |
| John J. Lyons | End | 7 | | | | | |
| Frank McHale | | | | | | | |
| James Musser | Tackle | 6 | | | | | |
| George "Bubbles" Paterson | Center | 7 | | | | | |
| Miller Pontius | Tackle; Fullback | 6; 1 | | | | | |
| Cyril Quinn | Fullback | 1 | | | | | |
| James W. Raynsford | Tackle; End | 2; 1 | | | | | |
| S. Spencer Scott | | | | | | | |
| Roy Torbet | End; Fullback | 4; 2 | | | | | |
| Royce A. Traphagen | Guard | 5 | | | | | |

=== Reserves ===
- Clyde Bastian, Williamsport, Pennsylvania – started 1 game at left halfback
- Everett L. Bentley, Detroit – started 1 game at fullback, 1 game at right halfback
- Leland Benton, Valparaiso, Indiana - started 2 games at fullback
- Harry M. Meade, Valparaiso, Indiana
- Frank G. Millard, Corunna, Michigan
- Emil Tessin, Hemlock, Michigan
- Robert W. Watson, Ludington, Michigan

== Awards and honors ==
- Captain: George "Bubbles" Paterson
- All-Americans: Miller Pontius, Jimmy Craig, George Paterson, Ernest Hughitt

== Coaching staff ==
- Head coach: Fielding H. Yost
- Assistant coaches: William Cole, Prentiss Douglass, Germany Schulz
- Trainer: Stephen Farrell
- Manager: Morris A. Milligan
