= Frank Gould =

Frank Gould may refer to:

- Frank M. Gould, head college football coach for the Wabash College Little Giants
- Frank Jay Gould (1877–1956), son of financier Jay Gould
- Frank H. Gould, member of the California State Assembly
