= Luke Kelly (American football) =

American football player and coach (1888–1952)

Biographical details
- Born: December 26, 1888; Boston, Massachusetts, U.S.
- Died: February 6, 1952 (aged 63); Alameda County, California, U.S.

Playing career
- 1909–1911: Notre Dame
- Position: Tackle

Coaching career (HC unless noted)
- 1912–1913: Christian Brothers (MO)
- 1914–1917: Holy Cross
- 1919–1929: Holy Cross (line)

Head coaching record
- Overall: 26–20–4 (college)

Luke Leo Kelly (December 26, 1888 – February 6, 1952) was an American football player and coach who was the captain of the 1911 Notre Dame Fighting Irish football team and head coach of the Christian Brothers College and the College of the Holy Cross.

== Career ==
Kelly played tackle for the Notre Dame Fighting Irish football team from 1909 to 1911 and was captain of the team his senior year. After graduating, Kelly became head football coach at the Christian Brothers College in St. Louis. On October 25, 1913, Kelly's team scored a school record 96 points in a 96–6 blowout of the Cape Girardeau Normal school.

In 1914, Kelly was to return to Notre Dame as the lead assistant under Jesse Harper, but before the season started, he took the head coaching job at Holy Cross to be closer to home. He stepped down after the 1916 season to focus on his law practice, but when his successor, Frank Cavanaugh, entered the United States Army, Kelly returned. Kelly also served in the U.S. Army during World War I. From 1919 to 1929, Kelly was the line coach at Holy Cross under Cleo A. O'Donnell.

== Later life ==
In 1924, Kelly married Grace Kelley of Roslindale. Their only child, Robert, was struck and killed by an automobile on January 1, 1952, at the age of 24.

Kelly spent the last decade of his life in Oakland, where he worked as an attorney for the Veterans' Administration. He died on February 6, 1952, and was buried in Golden Gate National Cemetery in San Bruno, California.

== Head coaching record ==
Year	Team	Overall	Conference	Standing	Bowl/playoffs
Christian Brothers (Independent) (1912–1913)
1912	Christian Brothers	8–1			
1913	Christian Brothers	6–2–1			
Christian Brothers:		14–3–1			
Holy Cross (Independent) (1914–1917)
1914	Holy Cross	2–5–1			
1915	Holy Cross	3–3–2			
1916	Holy Cross	4–5			
1917	Holy Cross	3–4			
Holy Cross:		12–17–3			
Total:		26–20–4			
