= Elmer Horton =

Elmer Horton may refer to:

- Elmer Horton (baseball) (1869–1920), baseball pitcher
- Elmer G. Horton (c. 1866–1949), American pediatrician, college football player and coach, and college baseball coach
