= 1913 Michigan Agricultural Aggies football team =

American college football season

1913 Michigan Agricultural Aggies football
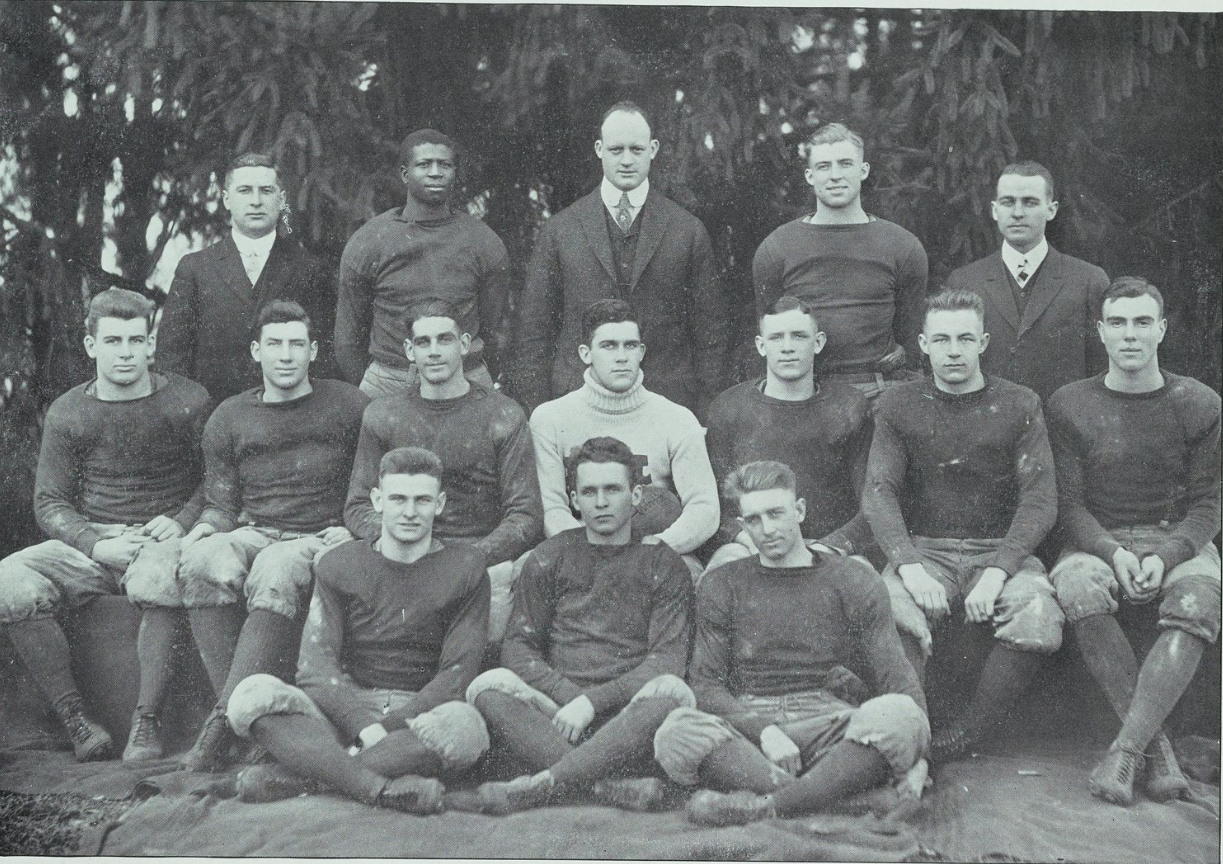
- Conference: Independent
- Record: 7–0
- Head coach: John Macklin (3rd season)
- Captain: Chester W. Gifford
- Home stadium: College Field

1913 Midwestern college football independents records
	Conf.			Overall
Team	W	L	T	W		L		T
Michigan Agricultural		–		7	–	0	–	0
Notre Dame		–		7	–	0	–	0
Western State Normal		–		4	–	0	–	0
Haskell		–		10	–	1	–	0
Michigan		–		6	–	1	–	0
Lake Forest		–		5	–	1	–	1
Doane		–		5	–	1	–	2
St. Mary's (OH)		–		4	–	1	–	1
Christian Brothers (MO)		–		6	–	2	–	1
Wabash		–		5	–	2	–	0
Detroit		–		5	–	3	–	1
Heidelberg		–		4	–	3	–	0
Marquette		–		4	–	3	–	1
Mount Union		–		4	–	3	–	2
Saint Louis		–		5	–	4	–	1
Lincoln (MO)		–		1	–	1	–	0
South Dakota		–		3	–	3	–	0
Northern Illinois State		–		3	–	3	–	3
Akron		–		3	–	4	–	0
Iowa State Teachers		–		2	–	3	–	1
Ohio Northern		–		4	–	6	–	1
Butler		–		2	–	4	–	1
Michigan State Normal		–		2	–	3	–	1
North Dakota Agricultural		–		0	–	2	–	2

The 1913 Michigan Agricultural Aggies football team was an American football team that represented Michigan Agricultural College (MAC) as an independent during the 1913 college football season. In their third year under head coach John Macklin, the Aggies compiled a 7–0 record and outscored their opponents 180 to 28.

Key players included George Gauthier, Gideon Smith, Blake Miller, George E. Julian, and Hugh Blacklock.

== Schedule ==
Date	Opponent	Site	Result	Attendance	Source
October 4	Olivet	College Field; East Lansing, MI	W 26–0		
October 11	Alma	College Field; East Lansing, MI	W 57–0	3,000	
October 18	at Michigan	Ferry Field; Ann Arbor, MI (rivalry)	W 12–7		
October 25	at Wisconsin	Randall Field; Madison, WI	W 12–7		
November 1	Akron	College Field; East Lansing, MI	W 41–0		
November 8	Mount Union	College Field; East Lansing, MI	W 13–7		
November 15	South Dakota	College Field; East Lansing, MI	W 19–7		

== Game summaries ==
=== Michigan ===
Michigan Agricultural at Michigan

Team	1	2	3	4	Total
• Michigan Agricultural	6	0	6	0	12
Michigan	0	0	0	7	7

- Date: October 18, 1913
- Location: Ferry Field
  Ann Arbor, MI
- Referee: Hoagland (Princeton)

On October 18, 1913, the Aggies played Michigan. For the first time in the history of the intrastate rivalry, the Aggies beat the Wolverines, 12-7. The Aggies' offense, led by fullback "Carp" Julian, scored touchdowns in the first and third quarters, but missed both extra points. Halfback Blake Miller returned a Michigan fumble 45 yards for the one touchdown, and the other score came on a long drive. An account of the game noted: "The one great feature of the game was the accuracy of the Aggies forward passing which netted a total of 76 yards for the Farmers." Trailing 12-0 at the start of the fourth quarter, the Wolverines rallied in the fourth quarter. Clyde Bastian recovered an M.A.C. fumble at midfield and returned it 45 yards for a touchdown, and George Paterson kicked the extra point, cutting the lead to five points. Late in the fourth quarter, Michigan opened up its offense and drove to the Aggies' 35-yard line. A long forward pass to the goal line fell incomplete, and the game came to an end. The New York Times described the game as "a desperate gruelling struggle." M.A.C. halfback Blake Miller suffered a blow to the head during the game and was hospitalized in serious condition.

In November 1913, The Michigan Alumnus made note of the Aggies' potential as an athletic threat: "This victory with the football tie in 1908, and the Farmers' clean sweep in baseball in 1912, point to the fact that M.A.C. will bear watching by Michigan." In the celebration following the game, two Aggies fans were arrested and jailed for "throwing bottles about the streets" in the early hours of Sunday morning.
