= Eichenlaub =

Eichenlaub is a German surname, meaning "oak leaves" in English. Notable people with this surname name include:

- Ray Eichenlaub (1882/1883 – 1949), American gridiron football player
- Richard Eichenlaub, convicted member of the Duquesne Spy Ring
- Rosi Eichenlaub (born 1958), German footballer
