= 1913 Notre Dame Fighting Irish football team =

American college football season

1913 Notre Dame Fighting Irish football
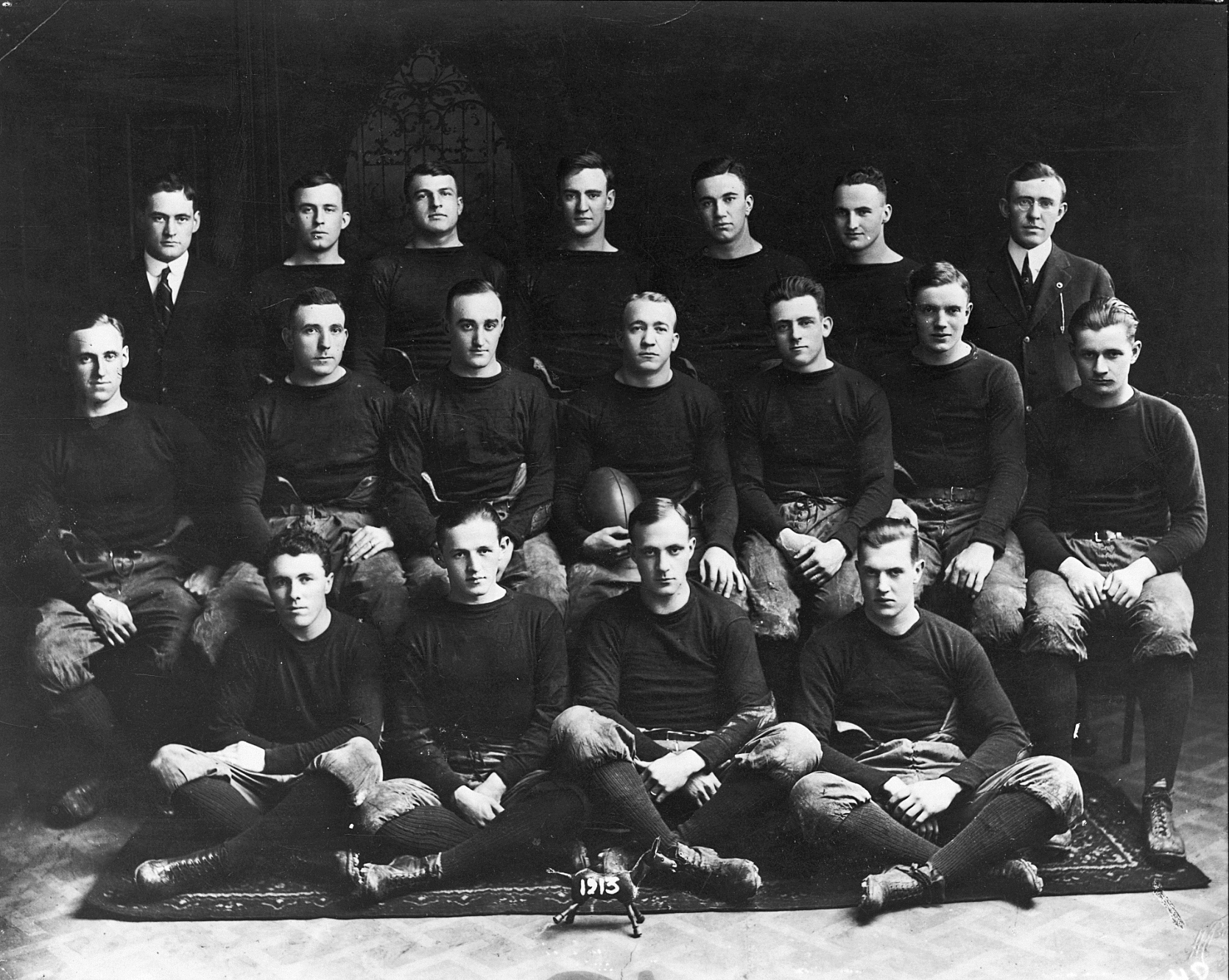
- Conference: Independent
- Record: 7–0
- Head coach: Jesse Harper (1st season)
- Offensive scheme: Single-wing
- Captain: Knute Rockne
- Home stadium: Cartier Field

1913 Midwestern college football independents records
	Conf.			Overall
Team	W	L	T	W		L		T
Michigan Agricultural		–		7	–	0	–	0
Notre Dame		–		7	–	0	–	0
Western State Normal		–		4	–	0	–	0
Haskell		–		10	–	1	–	0
Michigan		–		6	–	1	–	0
Lake Forest		–		5	–	1	–	1
Doane		–		5	–	1	–	2
St. Mary's (OH)		–		4	–	1	–	1
Christian Brothers (MO)		–		6	–	2	–	1
Wabash		–		5	–	2	–	0
Detroit		–		5	–	3	–	1
Heidelberg		–		4	–	3	–	0
Marquette		–		4	–	3	–	1
Mount Union		–		4	–	3	–	2
Saint Louis		–		5	–	4	–	1
Lincoln (MO)		–		1	–	1	–	0
South Dakota		–		3	–	3	–	0
Northern Illinois State		–		3	–	3	–	3
Akron		–		3	–	4	–	0
Iowa State Teachers		–		2	–	3	–	1
Ohio Northern		–		4	–	6	–	1
Butler		–		2	–	4	–	1
Michigan State Normal		–		2	–	3	–	1
North Dakota Agricultural		–		0	–	2	–	2

The 1913 Notre Dame Fighting Irish football team was an American football team that represented the University of Notre Dame as an independent during the 1913 college football season. In their first year under head coach Jesse Harper, the Irish compiled a perfect 7–0 record and outscored opponents by a total of 268 to 41. It was Notre Dame's third consecutive undefeated season.

Harper in 1913 began Notre Dame's practice of scheduling games against elite intersectional opponents. The season included the first game in the Army–Notre Dame football rivalry (a 35–13 Notre Dame victory) and victories over Penn State and Texas. Some contend that Notre Dame's upset victory over Army in 1913 marks "the true 'birth' of Notre Dame's football program."

Key players included quarterback Gus Dorais, end and team captain Knute Rockne, fullback Ray Eichenlaub, and guard Freeman Fitzgerald. Dorais, Rockne, and Eichenlaub all won consensus first-team honors on the 1913 All-Western college football team.

The team played its home games at Cartier Field in Notre Dame, Indiana.

== Schedule ==
Date	Time	Opponent	Site	Result	Source
October 4	3:30 p.m.	Ohio Northern	Cartier Field; Notre Dame, IN	W 87–0	
October 18		South Dakota	Cartier Field; Notre Dame, IN	W 20–7	
October 25	3:30 p.m.	Alma	Cartier Field; Notre Dame, IN	W 62–0	
November 1		at Army	The Plain; West Point, NY (rivalry)	W 35–13	
November 7		at Penn State	New Beaver Field; State College, PA (rivalry)	W 14–7	
November 22		at Christian Brothers (MO)	Robison Field; St. Louis, MO	W 20–7	
November 27		at Texas	Clark Field; Austin, TX	W 30–7	

== Game summaries ==
=== Week 4: at Army ===
On November 1, Notre Dame upset Army, 35–13, on The Plain at West Point. Led by quarterback Gus Dorais and future head coach Knute Rockne at end, Notre Dame attacked the Cadets with an offense that featured both a powerful running game and long and accurate downfield forward passes from Dorais to Rockne.

This game has often been miscredited as the invention of the forward pass. Prior to this contest, receivers would come to a full stop and wait on the ball to come to them, but in this contest, Dorais threw to Rockne in stride, changing the forward pass from a seldom-used play into the dominant ball-moving strategy that it is today.

== Personnel ==
=== Players ===
- Alvin Berger, halfback
- Alfred Bergman, halfback
- William J. Cook, guard/tackle
- Gus Dorais, quarterback
- Ed Duggan, fullback
- Ray Eichenlaub, fullback
- Mal Elward, end
- Albert G. Feeney, center
- Charles T. Finegan, halfback
- Freeman Fitzgerald, guard
- Fred Gushurst, end
- Keith K. "Deac" Jones, tackle
- Emmett Keefe, guard
- Albert V. King, guard
- Arthur B. Larkin, halfback
- Ralph G. Lathrop, tackle
- Joseph S. Pliska, halfback
- Knute Rockne, end and captain

=== Coaching staff ===
- Head coach - Jesse Harper
