= 1913 South Dakota Coyotes football team =

American college football season

1913 South Dakota Coyotes football
- Conference: Independent
- Record: 3–3
- Head coach: James Henderson (3rd season)

1913 Midwestern college football independents records
	Conf.			Overall
Team	W	L	T	W		L		T
Michigan Agricultural		–		7	–	0	–	0
Notre Dame		–		7	–	0	–	0
Western State Normal		–		4	–	0	–	0
Haskell		–		10	–	1	–	0
Michigan		–		6	–	1	–	0
Lake Forest		–		5	–	1	–	1
Doane		–		5	–	1	–	2
St. Mary's (OH)		–		4	–	1	–	1
Christian Brothers (MO)		–		6	–	2	–	1
Wabash		–		5	–	2	–	0
Detroit		–		5	–	3	–	1
Heidelberg		–		4	–	3	–	0
Marquette		–		4	–	3	–	1
Mount Union		–		4	–	3	–	2
Saint Louis		–		5	–	4	–	1
Lincoln (MO)		–		1	–	1	–	0
South Dakota		–		3	–	3	–	0
Northern Illinois State		–		3	–	3	–	3
Akron		–		3	–	4	–	0
Iowa State Teachers		–		2	–	3	–	1
Ohio Northern		–		4	–	6	–	1
Butler		–		2	–	4	–	1
Michigan State Normal		–		2	–	3	–	1
North Dakota Agricultural		–		0	–	2	–	2

The 1913 South Dakota Coyotes football team represented the University of South Dakota as an independent during the 1913 college football season. Led by third-year head coach James Henderson, the Coyotes compiled a record of 3–3.

== Schedule ==
Date	Opponent	Site	Result	Attendance	Source
September 27	at Minnesota	Northrop Field; Minneapolis, MN	L 0–14	7,000	
October 4	Nebraska Wesleyan	Vermillion, SD	W 57–7		
October 18	at Notre Dame	Cartier Field; Notre Dame, IN	L 7–20		
October 25	at Denver	Sioux Falls, SD	W 43–0		
November 15	at Michigan Agricultural	College Field; East Lansing, MI	L 7-19		
November 22	at Creighton	Omaha, NE	W 17–0		
