= Modesitt =

Modesitt is a surname. Notable people with the surname include:

- James B. Modesitt (1875–1946), American football and baseball coach
- Jeff Modesitt (1964–1990), American football player
- L. E. Modesitt Jr. (born 1943), American science fiction and fantasy author
