= 1913 Alma Maroon and Cream football team =

American college football season

1913 Alma Maroon and Cream football
- Conference: Michigan Intercollegiate Athletic Association
- Record: 3–4 (2–1 MIAA)
- Head coach: Wilfred C. Bleamaster (2nd season)

1913 Michigan Intercollegiate Athletic Association football standings
	Conf.					Overall
Team	W		L		T	W		L		T
Olivet $	3	–	1	–	0	4	–	3	–	0
Alma	2	–	1	–	0	3	–	4	–	0
Hillsdale	2	–	1	–	1	2	–	3	–	1
Albion	3	–	2	–	1	3	–	3	–	1
Adrian	1	–	2	–	0	2	–	4	–	0
Kalamazoo	0	–	4	–	0	2	–	4	–	0
$ – Conference champion

The 1913 Alma maroon and Cream football team represented the Alma College as a member of the Michigan Intercollegiate Athletic Association (MIAA) during the 1913 college football season. Led by second-year head coach Wilfred C. Bleamaster, Alma compiled an overall record of 3–4 with a mark of 2–1 in conference play, placing second in the MIAA.

== Schedule ==
Date	Time	Opponent	Site	Result	Attendance	Source
October 11		at Michigan Agricultural	College Field; East Lansing, MI	L 0–57	3,000	
October 18		at Albion	Albion, MI	W 33–0		
October 25	3:30 p.m.	at Notre Dame*	Cartier Field; Notre Dame, IN	L 0–62		
November 1		Adrian	Alma, MI	W 66–0		
November 8		at Michigan freshmen*	Ann Arbor, MI	L 0–47		
November 15		at Michigan State Normal*	Ypsilanti, MI	W 34–0		
November 22		at Olivet	Olivet, MI	L 0–13		
*Non-conference game
