= 1913 Haskell Indians football team =

American college football season

1913 Haskell Indians football
- Conference: Independent
- Record: 10–1
- Head coach: A. R. Kennedy (3rd season)
- Home stadium: Haskell Field

1913 Midwestern college football independents records
	Conf.			Overall
Team	W	L	T	W		L		T
Michigan Agricultural		–		7	–	0	–	0
Notre Dame		–		7	–	0	–	0
Western State Normal		–		4	–	0	–	0
Haskell		–		10	–	1	–	0
Michigan		–		6	–	1	–	0
Lake Forest		–		5	–	1	–	1
Doane		–		5	–	1	–	2
St. Mary's (OH)		–		4	–	1	–	1
Christian Brothers (MO)		–		6	–	2	–	1
Wabash		–		5	–	2	–	0
Detroit		–		5	–	3	–	1
Heidelberg		–		4	–	3	–	0
Marquette		–		4	–	3	–	1
Mount Union		–		4	–	3	–	2
Saint Louis		–		5	–	4	–	1
Lincoln (MO)		–		1	–	1	–	0
South Dakota		–		3	–	3	–	0
Northern Illinois State		–		3	–	3	–	3
Akron		–		3	–	4	–	0
Iowa State Teachers		–		2	–	3	–	1
Ohio Northern		–		4	–	6	–	1
Butler		–		2	–	4	–	1
Michigan State Normal		–		2	–	3	–	1
North Dakota Agricultural		–		0	–	2	–	2

The 1913 Haskell Indians football team was an American football team that represented the Haskell Indian Institute (now known as Haskell Indian Nations University) as an independent during the 1913 college football season. In its third season under head coach A. R. Kennedy, Haskell compiled a 10–1 record and outscored opponents by a total of 419 to 31. The team's victories included games against Texas A&M and Christian Brothers; the sole loss was to Nebraska. They were also the most dominant team of the 1913 college football season.

== Schedule ==
Date	Opponent	Site	Result	Attendance	Source
September 27	Kansas City Vets	Haskell Field; Lawrence, KS	W 62–0		
October 3	at Kansas State Normal	Emporia, KS	W 28–7		
October 11	at Baker	Baldwin City, KS	W 20–0		
October 16	Midland	Haskell Field; Lawrence, KS	W 101–0		
October 17	College of Emporia	Haskell Field; Lawrence, KS	W 60–0		
October 25	at Nebraska	Nebraska Field; Lincoln, NE	L 6–7		
November 1	at Creighton	Omaha, NE	W 7–0		
November 8	at Morningside	Sioux City, IA	W 28–0		
November 18	at Texas A&M	College Station, TX	W 28–0		
November 22	vs. Warrensburg Normal	Kansas City, MO	W 40–7		
November 27	vs. Christian Brothers (MO)	Federal League Park; Kansas City, MO	W 39–10	6,000	
