= 1913 Saint Louis Billikens football team =

American college football season

1913 Saint Louis Billikens football
- Conference: Independent
- Record: 2–5
- Head coach: Frank Dennie (2nd season)
- Home stadium: Sportsman's Park

1913 Midwestern college football independents records
	Conf.			Overall
Team	W	L	T	W		L		T
Michigan Agricultural		–		7	–	0	–	0
Notre Dame		–		7	–	0	–	0
Western State Normal		–		4	–	0	–	0
Haskell		–		10	–	1	–	0
Michigan		–		6	–	1	–	0
Lake Forest		–		5	–	1	–	1
Doane		–		5	–	1	–	2
St. Mary's (OH)		–		4	–	1	–	1
Christian Brothers (MO)		–		6	–	2	–	1
Wabash		–		5	–	2	–	0
Detroit		–		5	–	3	–	1
Heidelberg		–		4	–	3	–	0
Marquette		–		4	–	3	–	1
Mount Union		–		4	–	3	–	2
Saint Louis		–		5	–	4	–	1
Lincoln (MO)		–		1	–	1	–	0
South Dakota		–		3	–	3	–	0
Northern Illinois State		–		3	–	3	–	3
Akron		–		3	–	4	–	0
Iowa State Teachers		–		2	–	3	–	1
Ohio Northern		–		4	–	6	–	1
Butler		–		2	–	4	–	1
Michigan State Normal		–		2	–	3	–	1
North Dakota Agricultural		–		0	–	2	–	2

The 1913 Saint Louis Billikens football team was an American football team that represented Saint Louis University as an independent during the 1913 college football season. In their second and final season under head coach Frank Dennie, the Billikens compiled a 2–5 record and was outscored by a total of 197 to 92. The team played its home games at Sportsman's Park at St. Louis.

== Schedule ==
Date	Time	Opponent	Site	Result	Attendance	Source
October 4		Shurtleff	St. Louis, MO	W 7–0		
October 11		Rose Polytechnic	St. Louis, MO	L 7–14		
October 18	3:00 p.m.	Missouri Mines	Sportman's Park; St. Louis, MO	L 0–62		
November 1		Tulane	St. Louis, MO	L 6–12		
November 8		Ferguson Athletic Club	St. Louis, MO	W 72–0		
November 15		at Marquette	Milwaukee, WI	L 0–34		
November 27	2:30 p.m.	Syracuse	Sportsman's Park; St. Louis, MO	L 0–75	10,000	
