= 1913 Lincoln Tigers football team =

American college football season

1913 Lincoln Tigers football
- Conference: Independent
- Record: 1–1
- Head coach: Romeo West (5th season)

1913 Midwestern college football independents records
	Conf.			Overall
Team	W	L	T	W		L		T
Michigan Agricultural		–		7	–	0	–	0
Notre Dame		–		7	–	0	–	0
Western State Normal		–		4	–	0	–	0
Haskell		–		10	–	1	–	0
Michigan		–		6	–	1	–	0
Lake Forest		–		5	–	1	–	1
Doane		–		5	–	1	–	2
St. Mary's (OH)		–		4	–	1	–	1
Christian Brothers (MO)		–		6	–	2	–	1
Wabash		–		5	–	2	–	0
Detroit		–		5	–	3	–	1
Heidelberg		–		4	–	3	–	0
Marquette		–		4	–	3	–	1
Mount Union		–		4	–	3	–	2
Saint Louis		–		5	–	4	–	1
Lincoln (MO)		–		1	–	1	–	0
South Dakota		–		3	–	3	–	0
Northern Illinois State		–		3	–	3	–	3
Akron		–		3	–	4	–	0
Iowa State Teachers		–		2	–	3	–	1
Ohio Northern		–		4	–	6	–	1
Butler		–		2	–	4	–	1
Michigan State Normal		–		2	–	3	–	1
North Dakota Agricultural		–		0	–	2	–	2

The 1913 Lincoln Blue Tigers football team represented Lincoln Institute—now known as Lincoln University—in Jefferson City, Missouri as an independent during the 1913 college football season. Led by head coach Romeo West in his second stint at the helm, the Lincoln football team finished the season with a record of 1–1 after defeating Western University on the road in Kansas City, MO. Students celebrated the triumph when West telegraphed with the score. West was a Lincoln alumus, coached various other sports at the school, and held a teaching position during his time at Lincoln.

== Schedule ==
Date	Opponent	Site	Result	Source
November 17	at Columbia negroes	Columbia, MO	L 6–20	
November 27	at Western University (KS)	Kansas City, MO	W 24–0	
