= 1913 Western State Normal Hilltoppers football team =

American college football season

1913 Western State Normal Hilltoppers football
- Conference: Independent
- Record: 4–0
- Head coach: William H. Spaulding (7th season)
- Captain: Graham Barker
- Home stadium: Woodward Avenue grounds

1913 Midwestern college football independents records
	Conf.			Overall
Team	W	L	T	W		L		T
Michigan Agricultural		–		7	–	0	–	0
Notre Dame		–		7	–	0	–	0
Western State Normal		–		4	–	0	–	0
Haskell		–		10	–	1	–	0
Michigan		–		6	–	1	–	0
Lake Forest		–		5	–	1	–	1
Doane		–		5	–	1	–	2
St. Mary's (OH)		–		4	–	1	–	1
Christian Brothers (MO)		–		6	–	2	–	1
Wabash		–		5	–	2	–	0
Detroit		–		5	–	3	–	1
Heidelberg		–		4	–	3	–	0
Marquette		–		4	–	3	–	1
Mount Union		–		4	–	3	–	2
Saint Louis		–		5	–	4	–	1
Lincoln (MO)		–		1	–	1	–	0
South Dakota		–		3	–	3	–	0
Northern Illinois State		–		3	–	3	–	3
Akron		–		3	–	4	–	0
Iowa State Teachers		–		2	–	3	–	1
Ohio Northern		–		4	–	6	–	1
Butler		–		2	–	4	–	1
Michigan State Normal		–		2	–	3	–	1
North Dakota Agricultural		–		0	–	2	–	2

The 1913 Western State Normal Hilltoppers football team represented Western State Normal School (later renamed Western Michigan University) as an independent during the 1913 college football season. In their seventh season under head coach William H. Spaulding, the Hilltoppers compiled a 4–0 record and outscored their opponents, 59 to 15. End Graham Barker was the team captain.

== Schedule ==
Date	Time	Opponent	Site	Result	Source
October 10	3:00 p.m.	Albion	Woodward Avenue grounds; Kalamazoo, MI	W 20–3	
October 18		at Culver Military Academy	Culver, IN	W 13–6	
October 25		at Hope	Holland, MI	W 14–0	
November 4	2:45 p.m.	Michigan State Normal	Woodward Avenue grounds; Kalamazoo, MI	W 12–6	
