= Jake Gilbert =

American politician and football coach (born c. 1976)

- Born: c. 1976 (age 49–50); Indianapolis, Indiana, U.S.
- Political party: Republican

Member of the Westfield City Council from the 2nd district
- In office January 13, 2020 – January 4, 2024
- Preceded by: Steve Hoover
- Succeeded by: Victor McCarty

Personal details
- Spouse: Christina
- Children: 3
- Education: Wabash College (BA) Purdue University (MEd)
- Coaching career

Current position
- Title: Head coach
- Team: Wabash
- Conference: NCAC
- Record: 9–3

Biographical details
- Education: Wabash College (1998); Purdue University (2001)

Playing career
- 1994–1997: Wabash
- Position: Defensive tackle

Coaching career (HC unless noted)
- 1998–1999: Ben Davis HS (IN) (DL)
- 2000–2005: North Montgomery HS (IN)
- 2006–2007: Wabash (OL)
- 2008–2010: Wabash (DC)
- 2011–2023: Westfield HS (IN)
- 2024: Wabash (Assoc. HC/DC)
- 2024–present: Wabash

Head coaching record
- Overall: 9–3 (college); 133–90 (high school)
- Bowls: 1–1

Jake Gilbert (born c. 1976) is an American college football coach, former high school administrator, and former politician. He is the head football coach for Wabash College, a position he has held since 2024. He was the head football coach for North Montgomery High School from 2000 to 2005 and Westfield High School from 2011 to 2023. He also coached for Ben Davis High School. He played college football for Wabash as a defensive tackle.

In addition to his coaching career, Gilbert served on the Westfield City Council from 2020 to 2024, getting elected in 2019 as part of an anti-Andy Cook wave. In 2023, he ran for Mayor of Westfield, finishing a close second with 42% of the vote. After his loss, he took his position as the head football coach at Wabash.

== Head coaching record ==
=== College ===
Year	Team	Overall	Conference	Standing	Bowl/playoffs
Wabash Little Giants (North Coast Athletic Conference) (2024–present)
2024	Wabash	0–1	0–0	N/A (Note: Gilbert assumed head coaching duties following the retirement of Don Morel prior to the team's bowl game.)	L ForeverLawn
2025	Wabash	9–2	6–2	3rd	W ForeverLawn
2026	Wabash	0–0	0–0		
Wabash:		9–3	6–2		
Total:		9–3			

=== High school ===
Year	Team	Overall	Conference	Standing	Bowl/playoffs
North Montgomery Chargers (Sagamore Conference) (2000–2005)
2000	North Montgomery	6–5	5–2	3rd	
2001	North Montgomery	6–6	4–3	T–4th	
2002	North Montgomery	4–7	3–4	T–5th	
2003	North Montgomery	7–4	3–4	T–3rd	
2004	North Montgomery	5–5	4–3	4th	
2005	North Montgomery	2–9	1–6	7th	
North Montgomery:		30–36	20–22		
Westfield Shamrocks (Hoosier Crossroads Conference) (2011–2023)
2011	Westfield	5–6	4–5	6th	
2012	Westfield	3–7	3–6	8th	
2013	Westfield	12–2	8–1	T–1st	
2014	Westfield	7–5	3–3	T–3rd	
2015	Westfield	7–5	2–4	T–4th	
2016	Westfield	12–2	8–1	T–1st	
2017	Westfield	4–6	2–4	T–4th	
2018	Westfield	4–6	3–4	5th	
2019	Westfield	6–5	3–4	5th	
2020	Westfield	12–2	7–0	1st	
2021	Westfield	12–2	7–0	1st	
2022	Westfield	8–4	5–2	3rd	
2023	Westfield	11–2	6–1	2nd	
Westfield:		103–54	61–35		
Total:		133–90			
National championship Conference title Conference division title or championship game berth

== Political career ==
=== Westfield City Council (2020–2024) ===
Gilbert was elected to the Westfield City Council in 2019, representing District 2. He defeated Bob Beaudry in the Republican primary with 60.3% of the vote and was unopposed in the general election. His campaign focused on responsible city growth and building partnerships between schools and the city.

During his term, Gilbert spoke in favor of eventually building a Monon Trail tunnel at 161st Street, while also considering alternative solutions such as a HAWK crossing system. He also led discussions on conducting a traffic study to examine speed limits at trail crossings.

In 2021, Gilbert lent his support to the Woods, Robinson, Briggs Planned Unit Development.

Gilbert, along with the Council, was involved in discussions about the city's State Road 32 interlocal agreement with the Indiana Department of Transportation. While he supported the project, he disagreed with the Council President that the department was violating the agreement rules.

In late-2022, Gilbert voted in favor of an ordinance establishing term limits for elected officials in Westfield. The ordinance, proposed by Councilman Troy Patton, set a maximum of two four-year terms for the mayor and city council members and three four-year terms for the clerk-treasurer, effective after the 2023 municipal elections. The measure passed the council 5–2, with Gilbert among those supporting it, but faced a veto from Mayor Andy Cook, which the council later overturned with the same 5–2 vote.

In February 2023, Gilbert and other council members were involved in discussions surrounding the loss of Bastian Solutions to neighboring Noblesville. While Mayor Andy Cook criticized the council for taking a "no-growth attitude", Gilbert stated that once the council understood Bastian's expansion plans, it acted aggressively and competitively to try to retain the company, though ultimately the project moved to Noblesville.

In July 2023, Gilbert voted in favor of creating a parks board and department in Westfield, but the measure failed 3–4.

=== 2023 campaign for Westfield Mayor ===
On January 22, 2023, Jake Gilbert announced his candidacy for mayor of Westfield. He cited a desire to "give back" to the city that had supported him and his family, emphasizing his goal of uniting the city government and improving synergy among different branches of local government. Gilbert described himself as "not a politician".

Gilbert emphasized his experience as dean of wellness at Westfield High School, president of the Westfield Wellbeing Coalition, and his long record of issuing scholarships, mentoring, and engaging in local service initiatives.

Gilbert participated in two debates with his two primary opponents. He ultimately finished second in the primary with 42% of the vote losing to fellow Councilman and eventual winner, Scott Willis.

== Personal life ==
Gilbert and his wife, Christina, have three sons: Logan, Jackson, and Tyson. The family previously attended the Westfield campus of Northview Christian Church, where Gilbert volunteered.
