= 1913 Ohio Northern football team =

American college football season

1913 Ohio Northern football
- Conference: Independent
- Record: 4–6–1
- Head coach: Carl Peters (1st season)

1913 Midwestern college football independents records
	Conf.			Overall
Team	W	L	T	W		L		T
Michigan Agricultural		–		7	–	0	–	0
Notre Dame		–		7	–	0	–	0
Western State Normal		–		4	–	0	–	0
Haskell		–		10	–	1	–	0
Michigan		–		6	–	1	–	0
Lake Forest		–		5	–	1	–	1
Doane		–		5	–	1	–	2
St. Mary's (OH)		–		4	–	1	–	1
Christian Brothers (MO)		–		6	–	2	–	1
Wabash		–		5	–	2	–	0
Detroit		–		5	–	3	–	1
Heidelberg		–		4	–	3	–	0
Marquette		–		4	–	3	–	1
Mount Union		–		4	–	3	–	2
Saint Louis		–		5	–	4	–	1
Lincoln (MO)		–		1	–	1	–	0
South Dakota		–		3	–	3	–	0
Northern Illinois State		–		3	–	3	–	3
Akron		–		3	–	4	–	0
Iowa State Teachers		–		2	–	3	–	1
Ohio Northern		–		4	–	6	–	1
Butler		–		2	–	4	–	1
Michigan State Normal		–		2	–	3	–	1
North Dakota Agricultural		–		0	–	2	–	2

The 1913 Ohio Northern football team represented Ohio Northern University as an independent during the 1913 college football season. Led by Carl Peters in his first and only season as head coach, Ohio Northern compiled a record of 4–6–1.

== Schedule ==
Date	Time	Opponent	Site	Result	Attendance	Source
September 27		at Pittsburgh	D. C. & A. C. Park; Pittsburgh, PA	L 6–67	5,000	
October 4	3:30 p.m.	at Notre Dame	Cartier Field; Notre Dame, IN	L 0–87		
October 11		at Denison	Granville, OH	L 7–16		
October 18		at Kentucky	Stoll Field; Lexington, KY	L 0–21		
October 20	3:00 p.m.	at Transylvania	League Park; Lexington, KY	L 2–6		
October 25		Antioch	Ada, OH	W 46–0		
November 1		Otterbein	Ada, OH	W 19–7		
November 8		at Marietta	Marietta, OH	L 13–14		
November 15		at Mount Union	Alliance, OH	T 0–0		
November 22		Heidelberg	Ada, OH	W 32–0		
November 27		at Detroit	Mack Field; Detroit, MI	W 7–0		
