= 1913 Northern Illinois State Normal football team =

American college football season

1913 Northern Illinois State Normal football
- Conference: Independent
- Record: 3–3–3
- Head coach: William Wirtz (4th season)
- Captain: Jesse Donyes
- Home stadium: Glidden Field

1913 Midwestern college football independents records
| | Conf. | | | Overall |
| Team | W | L | T | W | | L | | T |
|---|---|---|---|---|---|---|---|---|
| Michigan Agricultural | | – | | 7 | – | 0 | – | 0 |
| Notre Dame | | – | | 7 | – | 0 | – | 0 |
| Western State Normal | | – | | 4 | – | 0 | – | 0 |
| Haskell | | – | | 10 | – | 1 | – | 0 |
| Michigan | | – | | 6 | – | 1 | – | 0 |
| Lake Forest | | – | | 5 | – | 1 | – | 1 |
| Doane | | – | | 5 | – | 1 | – | 2 |
| St. Mary's (OH) | | – | | 4 | – | 1 | – | 1 |
| Christian Brothers (MO) | | – | | 6 | – | 2 | – | 1 |
| Wabash | | – | | 5 | – | 2 | – | 0 |
| Detroit | | – | | 5 | – | 3 | – | 1 |
| Heidelberg | | – | | 4 | – | 3 | – | 0 |
| Marquette | | – | | 4 | – | 3 | – | 1 |
| Mount Union | | – | | 4 | – | 3 | – | 2 |
| Saint Louis | | – | | 5 | – | 4 | – | 1 |
| Lincoln (MO) | | – | | 1 | – | 1 | – | 0 |
| South Dakota | | – | | 3 | – | 3 | – | 0 |
| Northern Illinois State | | – | | 3 | – | 3 | – | 3 |
| Akron | | – | | 3 | – | 4 | – | 0 |
| Iowa State Teachers | | – | | 2 | – | 3 | – | 1 |
| Ohio Northern | | – | | 4 | – | 6 | – | 1 |
| Butler | | – | | 2 | – | 4 | – | 1 |
| Michigan State Normal | | – | | 2 | – | 3 | – | 1 |
| North Dakota Agricultural | | – | | 0 | – | 2 | – | 2 |

The 1913 Northern Illinois State Normal football team represented Northern Illinois State Normal College as an independent in the 1913 college football season. They were led by fourth-year head coach William Wirtz and played their home games at Glidden Field, located on the east end of campus. The team finished the season with a 3–3–3 record. Jesse Donyes was the team's captain.

== Schedule ==
| Date | Opponent | Site | Result | Source |
|---|---|---|---|---|
| September 27 | at Rochelle High School | Rochelle, IL | W 12–0 | |
| October 4 | at Beloit | Beloit, WI | L 0–115 | |
| October 11 | Alumni | Glidden Field; DeKalb, IL | T 0–0 | |
| October 18 | at Freeport High School | Freeport, IL | L 0–25 | |
| October 25 | at Sandwich High School | Sandwich, IL | T 13–13 | |
| November 1 | at Rockford High School reserves | Rockford, IL | T 0–0 | |
| November 8 | Woodstock High School | Glidden Field; DeKalb, IL | W 19–7 | |
| November 15 | Aurora | Glidden Field; DeKalb, IL | W 12–9 | |
| November 22 | at North-Western College | Naperville, IL | L 0–66 | |
