= Wilfred C. Bleamaster =

American football and basketball coach (1881–1973)

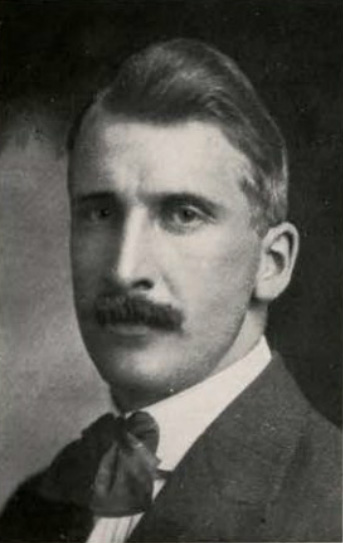
- Gem of the Mountains 1918, Idaho yearbook (spring 1917)

Biographical details
- Born: June 8, 1883; Lyons, Iowa, U.S.
- Died: December 19, 1973 (aged 90); Los Altos, California, U.S.
- Education: Grinnell College, B.S. 1908

Playing career

Football
- c. 1907: Grinnell

Coaching career (HC unless noted)

Football
- 1909–1911: Carroll (WI)
- 1912–1915: Alma
- 1916–1917: Idaho
- 1924–1925: Corvallis HS (OR)
- 1926–1927: Albany (OR)

Basketball
- 1909–1912: Carroll (WI)
- 1912–1916: Alma
- 1918–1919: Idaho
- 1924–1926: Corvallis HS (OR)

Baseball
- 1917–1919: Idaho
- 1925–1926: Corvallis HS (OR)

Track
- 1924–1926: Corvallis HS (OR)

Administrative career (AD unless noted)
- 1916–1920: Idaho
- 1924–1926: Corvallis HS (OR)
- 1926–1928: Albany (OR)

Head coaching record
- Overall: 28–29 (college basketball)

Accomplishments and honors

Championships
- Football; 1 MIAA (1912) Basketball; 1 Pacific Northwest Intercollegiate Conference (1919)

Wilfred Charles Bleamaster (June 8, 1883 – December 19, 1973) was an American football and basketball coach. He served as the head football coach at Carroll College—now Carroll University—in Waukesha, Wisconsin from 1909 to 1911, Alma College from 1912 to 1915, and the University of Idaho from 1916 to 1917, and Albany College—now known as Lewis & Clark College—from 1926 to 1927. Bleamaster was also the head basketball coach at Alma from 1912 to 1916 and at Idaho for the 1918–19 season, tallying a career college basketball mark of 28–29.

Bleamaster was captain of the football team at Grinnell College in Iowa and graduated in 1908.

== Coaching career ==
=== Carroll ===
Bleamaster the eighth head football coach for the Carroll College located in Waukesha, Wisconsin, and he held that position for three seasons, from 1909 until 1911. His coaching record at Carroll was 12–6–2.

=== Alma ===
Bleamaster was the head football coach at Alma College in Alma, Michigan for four seasons (1912–1915), and compiled a record of 11–13–3.

=== Idaho ===
Bleamaster went west in 1916 to the University of Idaho in Moscow to become its eighth head football coach and the athletic director. He coached the Idaho Vandals for the 1916 and 1917 seasons, and his teams posted a record of 5–8 in two seasons. Idaho did not field a football team in 1918, but Bleamaster succeeded Hec Edmundson as head coach of the basketball team for one season. He led Idaho to a 10–2 record and a championship in the Pacific Northwest Intercollegiate Conference in 1919, and also led the baseball program for three seasons.

=== Corvallis High School and Albany College ===
In August 1924, Bleamaster was hired as athletic director and football coach at Corvallis High School in Corvallis, Oregon. He also coached basketball, baseball, track at Corvallis. In August 1926, Bleamaster moved on to Albany College—now known as Lewis & Clark College—in Albany, Oregon, to take charge of all athletics at the school. He resigned from his post at Albany College after two years.

== Late life and death ==
Bleamaster returned to Corvallis in 1929 and worked as salesman there until 1958. From 1964 to 1969, he lived at the Hotel Benton in Corvallis. Bleamaster later resided with his daughter in Stanford, California. He died after a brief illness, on December 19, 1973, at a convalescent hospital in Los Altos, California.

== Head coaching record ==
=== College football ===
| Year | Team | Overall | Conference | Standing | Bowl/playoffs |
|---|---|---|---|---|---|
Carroll Pioneers (Independent) (1909–1911)
| 1909 | Carroll | 6–0 | | | |
| 1910 | Carroll | 3–2–1 | | | |
| 1911 | Carroll | 3–4–1 | | | |
| Carroll: | | 12–6–2 | | | |
Alma Maroon and Cream (Michigan Intercollegiate Athletic Association) (1912–1915)
| 1912 | Alma | 6–1 | 3–0 | 1st | |
| 1913 | Alma | 3–4 | 2–1 | T–2nd | |
| 1914 | Alma | 1–5–1 | 0–2 | 6th | |
| 1915 | Alma | 1–3–2 | 1–0–2 | 2nd | |
| Alma: | | 11–13–3 | 6–3–2 | | |
Idaho (Northwest Conference) (1916–1917)
| 1916 | Idaho | 3–5 | 0–3 | 6th | |
| 1917 | Idaho | 2–3 | 1–3 | 5th | |
| Idaho: | | 5–8 | 1–6 | | |
Albany Pirates (Independent) (1926–1927)
| 1926 | Albany | | | | |
| 1927 | Albany | | | | |
| Albany: | | | | | |
| Total: | | | | | |
National championship Conference title Conference division title or championship game berth
