= 1913 University of Akron football team =

American college football season

1913 Akron football
- Conference: Independent
- Record: 3–4
- Head coach: Frank Haggerty (4th season)
- Captain: Ralph Waldsmith

1913 Midwestern college football independents records
	Conf.			Overall
Team	W	L	T	W		L		T
Michigan Agricultural		–		7	–	0	–	0
Notre Dame		–		7	–	0	–	0
Western State Normal		–		4	–	0	–	0
Haskell		–		10	–	1	–	0
Michigan		–		6	–	1	–	0
Lake Forest		–		5	–	1	–	1
Doane		–		5	–	1	–	2
St. Mary's (OH)		–		4	–	1	–	1
Christian Brothers (MO)		–		6	–	2	–	1
Wabash		–		5	–	2	–	0
Detroit		–		5	–	3	–	1
Heidelberg		–		4	–	3	–	0
Marquette		–		4	–	3	–	1
Mount Union		–		4	–	3	–	2
Saint Louis		–		5	–	4	–	1
Lincoln (MO)		–		1	–	1	–	0
South Dakota		–		3	–	3	–	0
Northern Illinois State		–		3	–	3	–	3
Akron		–		3	–	4	–	0
Iowa State Teachers		–		2	–	3	–	1
Ohio Northern		–		4	–	6	–	1
Butler		–		2	–	4	–	1
Michigan State Normal		–		2	–	3	–	1
North Dakota Agricultural		–		0	–	2	–	2

The 1913 Akron football team represented the University of Akron, formerly Buchtel College, in the 1913 college football season. The team was led by head coach Frank Haggerty, in his fourth season. Akron was outscored by their opponents by a total of 87–103.

== Schedule ==
Date	Opponent	Site	Result
September 27	Case	Akron, OH	L 17–36
October 11	Allegheny	Akron, OH	L 0–6
October 18	Otterbein	Akron, OH	W 38–6
October 25	West Virginia Wesleyan	Akron, OH	W 9–7
November 1	at Michigan Agricultural	College Field; East Lansing, MI	L 0–41
November 15	Marietta	Akron, OH	W 23–0
November 22	Western Reserve	Akron, OH	L 0–7
