= Clarence H. Thurber =

American university administrator and college athletics coach

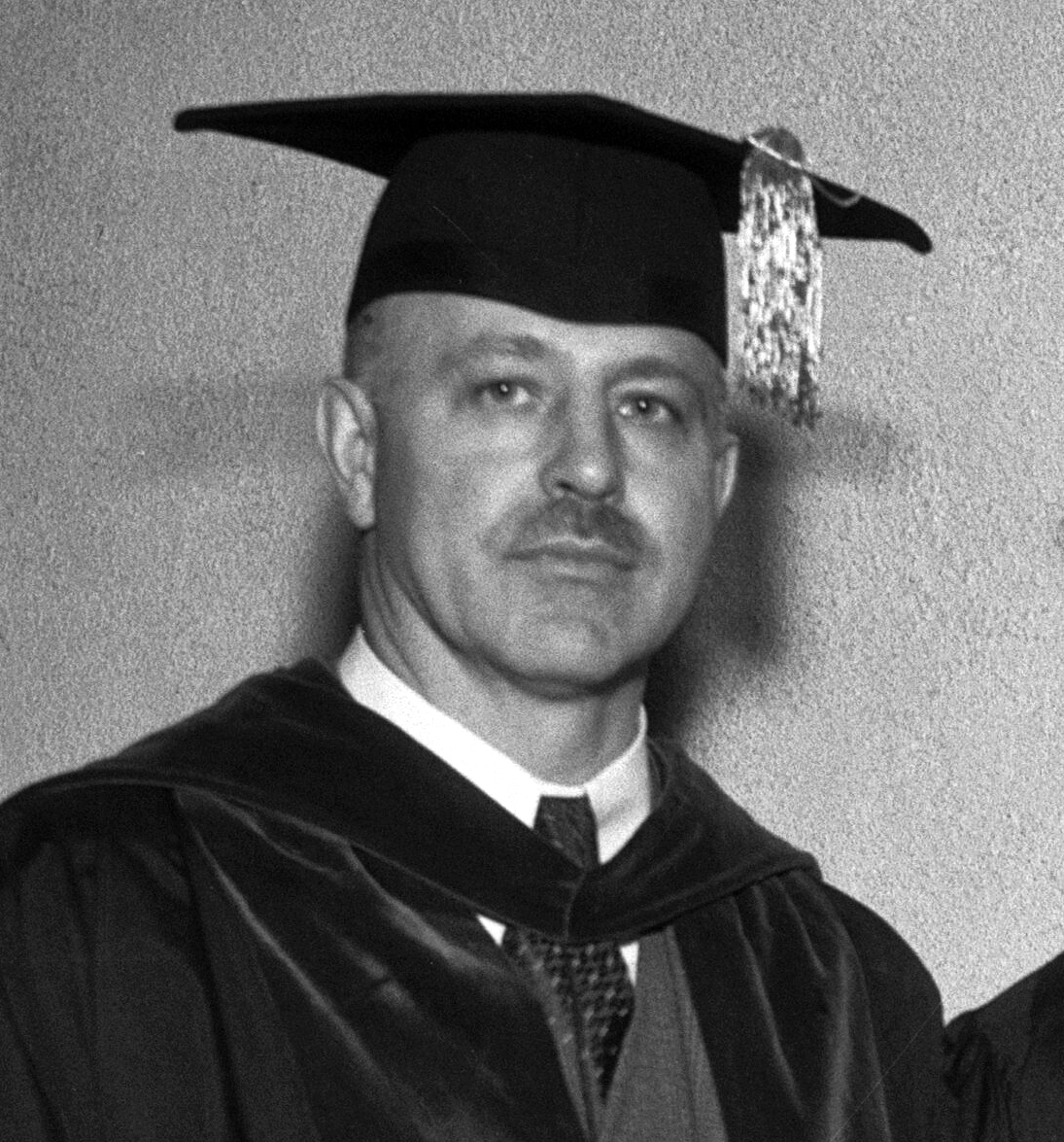
- Thurber in 1936

Biographical details
- Born: September 19, 1888; Guilford, Vermont, U.S.
- Died: November 1, 1966 (aged 78); Pasadena, California, U.S.

Playing career

Football
- 1909–1911: Colgate
- Position: Tackle

Coaching career (HC unless noted)

Football
- 1913–1914: Wabash

Basketball
- 1913–1915: Wabash

Baseball
- 1914–1915: Wabash

Head coaching record
- Overall: 7–6–1 (football); 18–7 (basketball); 11–13 (baseball)

Clarence Howe Thurber (September 19, 1888 – November 1, 1966) an American university administrator and college athletics coach. He was the 19th head football coach at Wabash College in Crawfordsville, Indiana, serving for two seasons, from 1913 to 1914, compiling a record of 7–6–1. Thurber was also the head basketball coach at Wabash from 1913 to 1915, tallying a mark of 18–7, and the head baseball coach there from 1914 to 1915, amassing a record of 11–13. Thurber served as the president of the University of Redlands in Redlands, California from 1933 to 1938. He died on November 1, 1966, in Pasadena, California, following a long illness.

== Head coaching record ==
=== Football ===
Year	Team	Overall	Conference	Standing	Bowl/playoffs
Wabash Little Giants (Independent) (1913–1914)
1913	Wabash	5–2			
1914	Wabash	2–2–2			
Wabash:		7–4–2			
Total:		7–4–2			
