= 1913 Christian Brothers football team =

American college football season

1913 Christian Brothers football
- Conference: Independent
- Record: 6–2–1
- Head coach: Luke Kelly
- Home stadium: Robison Field

1913 Midwestern college football independents records
	Conf.			Overall
Team	W	L	T	W		L		T
Michigan Agricultural		–		7	–	0	–	0
Notre Dame		–		7	–	0	–	0
Western State Normal		–		4	–	0	–	0
Haskell		–		10	–	1	–	0
Michigan		–		6	–	1	–	0
Lake Forest		–		5	–	1	–	1
Doane		–		5	–	1	–	2
St. Mary's (OH)		–		4	–	1	–	1
Christian Brothers (MO)		–		6	–	2	–	1
Wabash		–		5	–	2	–	0
Detroit		–		5	–	3	–	1
Heidelberg		–		4	–	3	–	0
Marquette		–		4	–	3	–	1
Mount Union		–		4	–	3	–	2
Saint Louis		–		5	–	4	–	1
Lincoln (MO)		–		1	–	1	–	0
South Dakota		–		3	–	3	–	0
Northern Illinois State		–		3	–	3	–	3
Akron		–		3	–	4	–	0
Iowa State Teachers		–		2	–	3	–	1
Ohio Northern		–		4	–	6	–	1
Butler		–		2	–	4	–	1
Michigan State Normal		–		2	–	3	–	1
North Dakota Agricultural		–		0	–	2	–	2

The 1913 Christian Brothers football team represented the Christian Brothers College during the 1913 college football season. The Brothers compiled a 6–2–1 record and outscored their opponents 251 to 85. Luke Kelly was the team's head coach for the second year. The team broke the school's scoring record with 97 points against Cape Girardeau Normal.

The 1913 Christian Brothers team was reported to be the first college football team to adopt "the figure system of numbering the players" -- a system in which each athlete was numbered according to his position on the field, and the names and numbers of each player were printed on score cards that were distributed to the spectators.

== Schedule ==
Date	Opponent	Site	Result	Attendance	Source
September 27	Christian University (MO)	St. Louis, MO	W 44–0		
October 4	Central (MO)	CBC Campus; St. Louis, MO	W 14–0		
October 11	Missouri Mines	Rolla, MO	T 7–7		
October 18	Illinois Wesleyan	Robison Field; St. Louis, MO	W 17–0		
October 25	Cape Girardeau Normal	St. Louis, MO	W 97–6		
November 1	DePaul	Robison Field; St. Louis, MO	W 33–7 (forfeit)		
November 8	Kirksville Osteopaths	Robison Field; St. Louis, MO	W 21–3		
November 22	Notre Dame	Robison Field; St. Louis, MO	L 7–20		
November 27	vs. Haskell	Federal League Park; Kansas City, MO	L 10–39	6,000	
	Osceola Athletic Club	Osceola, AR	W 26–6		
