= Ray Eichenlaub =

American football player (1892–1949)

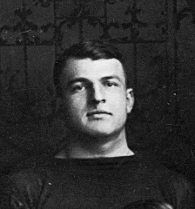
- Eichenlaub in 1913

Profile
- Position: Fullback

Personal information
- Born: 1892/1893; Columbus, Ohio, U.S.
- Died: November 9, 1949 (aged 56–57); Columbus, Ohio, U.S.
- Listed height: 6 ft 0 in (1.83 m)
- Listed weight: 210 lb (95 kg)

Career information
- High school: East (Columbus)
- College: Notre Dame (1911–1914)

Career history
- Columbus Tigers (1925)
- Stats at Pro Football Reference
- College Football Hall of Fame

Raymond Joseph Eichenlaub (1892/1893 – November 9, 1949) was an American football player. Nicknamed "Eich", (Note: A nickname of "Iron Eich" is noted by the College Football Hall of Fame, but examples of that nickname being used when Eichenlaub was an active player are lacking.) he was best known for playing college football for the Notre Dame Fighting Irish.

== Biography ==
Eichenlaub was born in Columbus, Ohio—his date of birth varies by source, most indicating January 10 of 1892 or 1893. (Note: Eichenlaub's 1942 draft registration card listed January 10, 1892. His 1957 headstone application initially listed January 10, 1893, with the year manually altered to 1892. Online images of his death certificate and actual headstone indicate January 10, 1893. The College Football Hall of Fame and pro-football-reference.com both list July 15, 1892.)

After graduating from East High School in his hometown, Eichenlaub received collegiate offers from Notre Dame and Michigan. He selected Notre Dame, where he played as a fullback for the Fighting Irish football teams of 1911 to 1914. Eichenlaub wore uniform number 13 for his first three seasons, then number 33 as a senior. The Fighting Irish compiled a record of 26–2–2 (.900) during his four seasons.

With the 1913 Fighting Irish, which featured Gus Dorais and Knute Rockne and finished with a 7–0 record, Eichenlaub scored 12 touchdowns. In the spring of 1914, various newspapers reported that Eichenlaub was in danger of losing his eyesight due to conjunctivitis, but this was refuted by Notre Dame head coach Jesse Harper. For all but his freshman season, Eichenlaub was named to All-Western teams and received All-America honors from some selectors of the era.

Eichenlaub also competed in track and field, in shot put and discus, for Notre Dame. Initially elected as captain of the 1915 track and field team, Eichenlaub quit athletics early in 1915 and was succeeded by Dutch Bergman.

Eichenlaub served in the United States Army in the 12th Field Artillery Regiment from September 1917 to December 1918, and was honorably discharged as a lieutenant. He played on the military football team at Camp Sherman, Ohio, in the fall of 1917. In December 1922, Eichenlaub played in an all-star charity game at Ohio State University. He also played four games for the Columbus Tigers of the National Football League (NFL) in 1925, and served as a college football official for 25 years.

Outside of athletics, Eichenlaub was an insurance executive in his hometown of Columbus. During his time in the military, he married Emma Elizabeth Eberle on August 2, 1918. A son, Ray Jr., played football at Notre Dame in the early 1940s. Eichenlaub was elected president of the Notre Dame alumni association for 1940–41. He died in Columbus in 1949 of a heart attack, and was buried in Lockbourne, Ohio. In 1972, Eichenlaub was inducted to the College Football Hall of Fame.
