= Robert A. King (American football) =

American football coach

Biographical details
- Education: Hamilton (1885)

Coaching career (HC unless noted)
- 1890: Wabash

Head coaching record
- Overall: 0–3

Robert A. King was an American college football coach. He was the fifth head football coach at Wabash College in Crawfordsville, Indiana, serving for one season, in 1890, and compiling a record of 0–3.

== Head coaching record ==
Year	Team	Overall	Conference	Standing	Bowl/playoffs
Wabash (Indiana Intercollegiate Athletic Association) (1890)
1890	Wabash	0–3	0–3		
Wabash:		0–3	0–3		
Total:		0–3			
