= 1913 North Dakota Agricultural Aggies football team =

American college football season

1913 North Dakota Agricultural Aggies football
- Conference: Independent
- Record: 0–2–2
- Head coach: Howard Wood (1st season)
- Captain: Grover Edwards
- Home stadium: Dacotah Field

1913 Midwestern college football independents records
	Conf.			Overall
Team	W	L	T	W		L		T
Michigan Agricultural		–		7	–	0	–	0
Notre Dame		–		7	–	0	–	0
Western State Normal		–		4	–	0	–	0
Haskell		–		10	–	1	–	0
Michigan		–		6	–	1	–	0
Lake Forest		–		5	–	1	–	1
Doane		–		5	–	1	–	2
St. Mary's (OH)		–		4	–	1	–	1
Christian Brothers (MO)		–		6	–	2	–	1
Wabash		–		5	–	2	–	0
Detroit		–		5	–	3	–	1
Heidelberg		–		4	–	3	–	0
Marquette		–		4	–	3	–	1
Mount Union		–		4	–	3	–	2
Saint Louis		–		5	–	4	–	1
Lincoln (MO)		–		1	–	1	–	0
South Dakota		–		3	–	3	–	0
Northern Illinois State		–		3	–	3	–	3
Akron		–		3	–	4	–	0
Iowa State Teachers		–		2	–	3	–	1
Ohio Northern		–		4	–	6	–	1
Butler		–		2	–	4	–	1
Michigan State Normal		–		2	–	3	–	1
North Dakota Agricultural		–		0	–	2	–	2

The 1913 North Dakota Agricultural Aggies football team was an American football team that represented North Dakota Agricultural College (now known as North Dakota State University) as an independent during the 1913 college football season. In their first year under head coach Howard Wood, the team compiled a 0–2–2 record.

== Schedule ==
Date	Opponent	Site	Result	Source
October 11	at Wahpeton	Wahpeton, ND	T 0–0	
October 18	at South Dakota State	Sioux Falls, SD (rivalry)	L 6–7	
October 25	Fargo	Dacotah Field; Fargo, ND	T 0–0	
November 1	North Dakota	Dacotah Field; Fargo, ND (rivalry)	L 14–20	
