= 1913 Detroit Tigers football team =

American college football season

1913 Detroit Tigers football
- Conference: Independent
- Record: 5–3–1
- Head coach: George M. Lawton (1st season)
- Home stadium: Mack Park

1913 Midwestern college football independents records
	Conf.			Overall
Team	W	L	T	W		L		T
Michigan Agricultural		–		7	–	0	–	0
Notre Dame		–		7	–	0	–	0
Western State Normal		–		4	–	0	–	0
Haskell		–		10	–	1	–	0
Michigan		–		6	–	1	–	0
Lake Forest		–		5	–	1	–	1
Doane		–		5	–	1	–	2
St. Mary's (OH)		–		4	–	1	–	1
Christian Brothers (MO)		–		6	–	2	–	1
Wabash		–		5	–	2	–	0
Detroit		–		5	–	3	–	1
Heidelberg		–		4	–	3	–	0
Marquette		–		4	–	3	–	1
Mount Union		–		4	–	3	–	2
Saint Louis		–		5	–	4	–	1
Lincoln (MO)		–		1	–	1	–	0
South Dakota		–		3	–	3	–	0
Northern Illinois State		–		3	–	3	–	3
Akron		–		3	–	4	–	0
Iowa State Teachers		–		2	–	3	–	1
Ohio Northern		–		4	–	6	–	1
Butler		–		2	–	4	–	1
Michigan State Normal		–		2	–	3	–	1
North Dakota Agricultural		–		0	–	2	–	2

The 1913 Detroit Tigers football team was an American football team that represented the University of Detroit in the 1913 college football season. In its first season under head coach George M. Lawton, the team compiled a 5–3–1 record and outscored its opponents by a combined total of 166 to 85.

== Schedule ==
Date	Opponent	Site	Result	Source
September 27	Polish Seminary	Mack Park; Detroit, MI	W 52–0	
October 4	Battle Creek "Y"	Detroit, MI	W 61–0	
October 11	at Assumption (ON)	Sandwich, Windsor, ON	W 7–0	
October 18	Olivet	Mack Park; Detroit, MI	W 13–12	
October 25	at Michigan State Normal	Ypsilanti, MI	T 0–0	
November 1	Michigan freshmen	Detroit, MI	L 6–39	
November 8	Loyola University Chicago		W 27–6	
November 15	at Heidelberg	Tiffin, OH	L 0–21	
November 27	Ohio Northern	Mack Park; Detroit, MI	L 0–7	
