= 1913 Michigan State Normal Normalites football team =

American college football season

1913 Michigan State Normal Normalites football
- Conference: Independent
- Record: 2–3–1
- Head coach: Leroy Brown (2nd season)
- Captain: S. B. Crouse

1913 Midwestern college football independents records
	Conf.			Overall
Team	W	L	T	W		L		T
Michigan Agricultural		–		7	–	0	–	0
Notre Dame		–		7	–	0	–	0
Western State Normal		–		4	–	0	–	0
Haskell		–		10	–	1	–	0
Michigan		–		6	–	1	–	0
Lake Forest		–		5	–	1	–	1
Doane		–		5	–	1	–	2
St. Mary's (OH)		–		4	–	1	–	1
Christian Brothers (MO)		–		6	–	2	–	1
Wabash		–		5	–	2	–	0
Detroit		–		5	–	3	–	1
Heidelberg		–		4	–	3	–	0
Marquette		–		4	–	3	–	1
Mount Union		–		4	–	3	–	2
Saint Louis		–		5	–	4	–	1
Lincoln (MO)		–		1	–	1	–	0
South Dakota		–		3	–	3	–	0
Northern Illinois State		–		3	–	3	–	3
Akron		–		3	–	4	–	0
Iowa State Teachers		–		2	–	3	–	1
Ohio Northern		–		4	–	6	–	1
Butler		–		2	–	4	–	1
Michigan State Normal		–		2	–	3	–	1
North Dakota Agricultural		–		0	–	2	–	2

The 1913 Michigan State Normal Normalites football team was an American football team that represented Michigan State Normal College (later renamed Eastern Michigan University) as an independent during the 1913 college football season. In their second and final season under head coach Leroy Brown, the Normalites compiled a 2–3–1 record and were outscored by a total of 72 to 44. S. B. Crouse was the team captain.

== Schedule ==
Date	Time	Opponent	Site	Result	Source
October 11		at Michigan freshmen	Ann Arbor, MI	L 0–26	
October 18		Assumption (ON)	Ypsilanti, MI	W 38–0	
October 25		Detroit	Ypsilanti, MI	T 0–0	
November 4	2:45 p.m.	at Western State Normal	Woodward Avenue grounds; Kalamazoo, MI	L 6–12	
November 15		Alma	Ypsilanti, MI	L 0–34	
November 22		at Hillsdale	Hillsdale, MI	W 6–0	
