= Ed Duggan =

American football player and coach (1891–1950)

Biographical details
- Born: May 19, 1891; Whiteland, Indiana
- Died: October 16, 1950 (aged 59); Houston, Texas

Playing career
- 1911–1914: Notre Dame
- 1921: Rock Island Independents
- Position: Fullback

Coaching career (HC unless noted)
- 1922–1927: Franklin (IN)
- 1928–1936: Sam Houston HS (TX)
- 1937–1946: Lamar HS (TX)

Edward Dean Duggan (May 19, 1891 – October 16, 1950) was an American football player and coach. He played college football at the University of Notre Dame from 1911 to 1914 and professionally for the Rock Island Independents of the National Football League (NFL) in 1921. Duggan was the head football coach at Franklin College in Franklin, Indiana from 1922 to 1927. He coached high school football in Houston, Texas, at Sam Houston High School from 1928 to 1936 and then at Lamar High School from 1937 until his retirement in 1946. Duggan died of heart attack on October 16, 1950, in Houston.
