= Tackling dummy =

Type of gridiron football training equipment

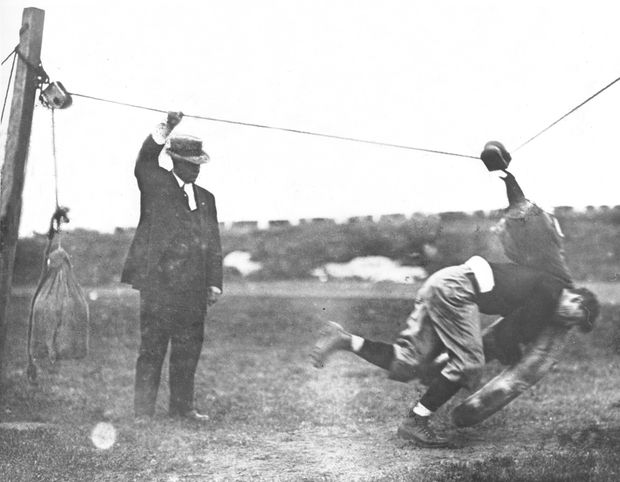
Jim Thorpe tackling a dummy while Pop Warner looks on (1912)

A tackling dummy is a type of training equipment used in gridiron football in order to help players improve their tackling ability. Tackling dummies are also used in rushing drills.

== Anecdotes ==
The following is a list of selected anecdotes covering the history of the tackling dummy:

- In 1899, Amos Alonzo Stagg is believed to have invented the first tackling dummy.
- In 1901, The Philadelphia Times reported that the Penn Quakers would begin to use the "modern appliance" of the tackling dummy despite head coach George Washington Woodruff's longstanding opposition to the device.
- In 1913, Washington State head coach John R. Bender banned the tackling dummy at the school, stating "I have had pretty good tackling teams, on the average, and have not used the dummy for several years. Several of my best men have been rather seriously hurt on the dummy."
- In 1949, Hamilton, Ohio, police officer and part-time Hamilton High School football coach Grant King invented a tackling dummy that moved on a 60-foot track powered by an electric motor with adjustable speeds.
- In 2015, Dartmouth began using a remote-controlled tackling dummy.
