= Elmer G. Horton =

American football and baseball coach

Biographical details
- Born: c. 1866
- Died: May 30, 1949 (aged 82)
- Education: Cornell (1892)

Playing career

Football
- 1890–1891: Cornell

Coaching career (HC unless noted)

Football
- 1893: Wabash

Baseball
- 1893–1894: Wabash

Head coaching record
- Overall: 2–4 (football); 3–8 (baseball)

Elmer G. Horton (c. 1866 – May 30, 1949) was an American pediatrician, college football player and coach, and college baseball coach. He was the eighth head football coach at Wabash College in Crawfordsville, Indiana, serving for one season, in 1893 season, and compiling a record of 2–4. Horton was also the head baseball coach at Wabash from 1893 to 1894, tallying a mark of 3–8.

A native of Arcade, New York, Horton played football at Cornell in 1890 and 1891. He was appointed a professor at Wabash College in 1893. He graduated from Starling Medical College—now known as the Ohio State University College of Medicine—1906. Horton was later a professor of pediatrics at Ohio State. He died on May 30, 1949.

== Head coaching record ==
=== Football ===
Year	Team	Overall	Conference	Standing	Bowl/playoffs
Wabash (Indiana Intercollegiate Athletic Association) (1893)
1893	Wabash	2–4	1–3	4th	
Wabash:		2–4	1–3		
Total:		2–4			
