= Frank M. Gould =

American football coach

Coaching career (HC unless noted)
- 1896: Wabash

Head coaching record
- Overall: 3–4

Frank M. Gould was an American football coach. He was the 11th head football coach at Wabash College in Crawfordsville, Indiana, serving for one season, in 1896, and compiling a record of 3–4.

== Head coaching record ==
Year	Team	Overall	Conference	Standing	Bowl/playoffs
Wabash (Independent) (1896)
1896	Wabash	3–4			
Wabash:		3–4			
Total:		3–4			
