= George E. Julian =

American football player (1893–1945)

Biographical details
- Born: February 6, 1893; Rochester, New York, U.S.
- Died: May 9, 1945 (aged 52); Lansing, Michigan, U.S.
- Education: Michigan Agricultural College (1915)

Playing career
- 1911–1914: Michigan Agricultural
- 1915–1916: Canton Bulldogs
- Position: Fullback

Coaching career (HC unless noted)
- 1923: Michigan Agricultural (backfield)

Accomplishments and honors

Awards
- Second-team All-American (1913)

George Edward "Carp" Julian (February 6, 1893 – May 9, 1945) was an American football player. He played at the fullback position at Michigan Agricultural College (MAC), now known as Michigan State University, from 1911 to 1914. He was selected by Walter Eckersall in 1913 as a second-team All-American fullback. He also served as captain of MAC's 1914 football team. He later played professional football for Jim Thorpe's Canton Bulldogs in 1915 and 1916, gaining 205 yards in four games.

In 1923, Julian joined the Michigan Agricultural football team as the team's unofficial backfield coach under first-year head coach Ralph H. Young.

He died on May 9, 1945, in Lansing, Michigan.
