= James B. Modesitt =

American football and baseball coach

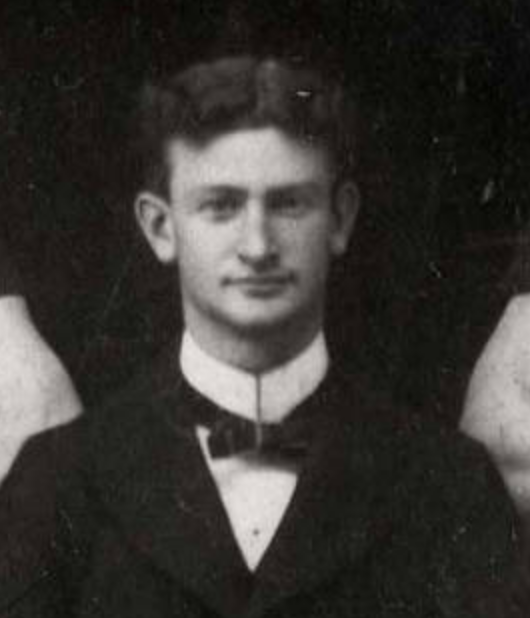

Biographical details
- Born: November 24, 1875; Terre Haute, Indiana, U.S.
- Died: September 13, 1946 (aged 70); Asheville, North Carolina, U.S.

Coaching career (HC unless noted)

Football
- 1898–1899: Wabash

Baseball
- 1899: Wabash

Head coaching record
- Overall: 3–5–2 (football); 2–6 (baseball)

James Bert Modesitt (November 24, 1875 – September 13, 1946) was an American college football and college baseball coach. He was the 12th head football coach at Wabash College in Crawfordsville, Indiana, serving for two seasons, from 1898 to 1899, and compiling a record of 3–5–2. Modesitt was the first coach at Wabash to hold the post for more than one season. Modesitt was also the head baseball coach at Wabash in 1899, tallying a mark of 2–6.

== Head coaching record ==
=== Football ===
| Year | Team | Overall | Conference | Standing | Bowl/playoffs |
|---|---|---|---|---|---|
Wabash (Independent) (1898–1899)
| 1898 | Wabash | 2–5–1 | | | |
| 1899 | Wabash | 1–0–1 | | | |
| Wabash: | | 3–5–2 | | | |
| Total: | | 3–5–2 | | | |
