= S. Spencer Scott =

American football player and publisher (1892–1971)

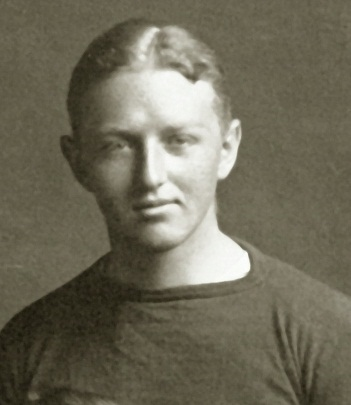

Profile
- Positions: Fullback, Tackle

Personal information
- Born: June 21, 1892; Elizabeth, New Jersey
- Died: January 1, 1971 (aged 78); Pompano Beach, Florida

Career information
- College: University of Michigan

Samuel Spencer Scott (June 21, 1892 – January 1, 1971) was an American publishing executive. He joined Harcourt, Brace in 1920 and developed the company's educational department into a business generating a million dollars in annual revenue. He became the president of Harcourt, Brace & Company in 1948 and held that position until his retirement in 1954.

Scott was born in Elizabeth, New Jersey, and attended preparatory school at Mercersburg Academy. He enrolled at the University of Michigan in 1910, receiving a degree in food and drug chemistry in 1914. Scott played college football as a fullback and tackle for the Michigan Wolverines football teams coached by Fielding H. Yost from 1911 to 1913. While attending Michigan, Scott was also the vice president of the Michigan Union and a member of Psi Upsilon, Michigamua, Alchemists, Student Council, Commerce Club, Glee Club and Comedy Club.

Scott also received a degree from the Columbia University Graduate School in 1919. At the end of World War I, he served in the U.S. Army's Chemical Warfare Service. He joined Harcourt, Brace in 1920, and lived in Scarsdale, New York, from the 1920s until the time of his death. In 1960, Scott received the distinguished alumni service medal from the University of Michigan. He died in 1971 while traveling at Pompano Beach, Florida.
