= Don Morel =

American football coach

Biographical details
- Education: University of La Verne

Coaching career (HC unless noted)
- 1987–1990: Cal State Fullerton (OL)
- 1991–1994: La Verne (OC)
- 1995–2006: La Verne
- 2012–2015: Wabash (OC)
- 2016–2024: Wabash

Head coaching record
- Overall: 109–79
- Tournaments: 0–1 (NCAA D-III playoffs)

Accomplishments and honors

Championships
- 1 SCIAC (1995); 2 NCAC (2018–2019)

Awards
- 2× NCAC Coach of the Year (2018–2019)

Don Morel is an American former college football coach. He was the head football coach for Wabash College from 2016 to 2024. Morel served as the head football coach at the University of La Verne in La Verne, California from 1995 to 2006.

== Head coaching record ==
Year	Team	Overall	Conference	Standing	Bowl/playoffs
La Verne Leopards (Southern California Intercollegiate Athletic Conference) (1995–2006)
1995	La Verne	9–0	6–0	1st	
1996	La Verne	7–2	4–1	2nd	
1997	La Verne	2–7	2–3	4th	
1998	La Verne	4–5	2–3	T–3rd	
1999	La Verne	7–2	4–1	2nd	
2000	La Verne	2–7	2–3	T–3rd	
2001	La Verne	1–8	0–5	6th	
2002	La Verne	3–5	1–4	T–4th	
2003	La Verne	1–8	0–6	7th	
2004	La Verne	4–5	3–3	T–3rd	
2005	La Verne	5–4	3–3	4th	
2006	La Verne	3–6	3–3	T–3rd	
La Verne:		48–59	30–35		
Wabash Little Giants (North Coast Athletic Conference) (2016–2024)
2016	Wabash	8–2	7–2	T–2nd	
2017	Wabash	8–2	7–2	T–2nd	
2018	Wabash	9–1	8–1	T–1st	
2019	Wabash	7–4	7–2	T–1st	L NCAA Division III First Round
2020–21	No team—COVID-19				
2021	Wabash	7–3	6–3	T–4th	
2022	Wabash	7–3	6–2	T–2nd	
2023	Wabash	7–3	6–2	T–2nd	
2024	Wabash	8–2	7–1	2nd	
Wabash:		61–20	54–15		
Total:		109–79			
National championship Conference title Conference division title or championship game berth
