= Jesse Harper =

American football player and coach (1883–1961)

- Jesse Harper, 1932

Biographical details
- Born: December 10, 1883; Paw Paw, Illinois, U.S.
- Died: July 31, 1961 (aged 77); Sitka, Kansas, U.S.

Playing career

Football
- 1905: Chicago

Baseball
- 1903–1906: Chicago

Coaching career (HC unless noted)

Football
- 1906–1907: Alma
- 1909–1912: Wabash
- 1913–1917: Notre Dame

Basketball
- 1910–1913: Wabash
- 1913–1918: Notre Dame

Baseball
- 1910–1913: Wabash
- 1914–1918: Notre Dame

Administrative career (AD unless noted)
- 1913–1917: Notre Dame
- 1931–1933: Notre Dame

Head coaching record
- Overall: 57–17–7 (football); 67–29 (basketball); 88–53–1 (baseball)
- College Football Hall of Fame; Inducted in 1971 (profile)

Jesse Clair Harper (December 10, 1883 – July 31, 1961) was an American football and baseball player, coach, and college athletics administrator. He served as the head football coach at Alma College (1906–1907), Wabash College (1909–1912), and the University of Notre Dame (1913–1917), compiling a career college football record of 57–17–7. Harper was inducted into the College Football Hall of Fame as a coach in 1971.

== Coaching career ==
=== Alma ===
Harper was the head football coach at Alma College in Alma, Michigan from 1906 to 1907. His record at Alma was 8–3–4.

=== Wabash ===
Harper was the 18th head football coach at Wabash College in Crawfordsville, Indiana, serving for four seasons, from to until 1912. His coaching record at Wabash was 15–9–2.

=== Notre Dame ===
Harper is most known for his coaching at the University of Notre Dame. His 1913 football squad posted a 35–13 win over Army, one that is regarded by most football historians as the game that put Notre Dame on the football map.

== Later life ==
Harper stepped down as head football coach after the 1917 season and returned to ranching in his home state of Kansas. His ranch was not far from where Knute Rockne was killed in a 1931 plane crash. Harper accompanied Rockne's body on the train from Kansas back to South Bend, Indiana, for the funeral and burial. The University of Notre Dame immediately hired Harper to fill Rockne's role as athletic director, a position in which he remained until 1934, when Elmer Layden became head football coach and athletic director.

Harper was married and had two sons and one daughter.

In 1963, he was inducted into the Hall of Great Westerners of the National Cowboy & Western Heritage Museum for his contributions to the cattle industry.

== Head coaching record ==
=== Football ===
Year	Team	Overall	Conference	Standing	Bowl/playoffs
Alma Maroon and Cream (Michigan Intercollegiate Athletic Association) (1906–1907)
1906	Alma	3–2–3	2–2–2		
1907	Alma	5–1–1	3–1–1		
Alma:		8–3–4	5–3–3		
Wabash Little Giants (Independent) (1909–1912)
1909	Wabash	3–4–1			
1910	Wabash	4–0			
1911	Wabash	3–3–1			
1912	Wabash	5–2			
Wabash:		15–9–2			
Notre Dame Fighting Irish (Independent) (1913–1917)
1913	Notre Dame	7–0			
1914	Notre Dame	6–2			
1915	Notre Dame	7–1			
1916	Notre Dame	8–1			
1917	Notre Dame	6–1–1			
Notre Dame:		34–5–1			
Total:		57–17–7			
