= Wabash Little Giants football =

College football team

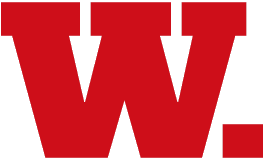
- First season: 1884; 142 years ago
- Athletic director: Matt Tanney
- Head coach: Jake Gilbert; 2nd season, 0–1 (.000)
- Location: Crawfordsville, Indiana
- Stadium: Hollett Little Giant Stadium (capacity: 3,550)
- Conference: NCAC
- Colors: Red and White
- All-time record: 717–401–59 (.634)

Conference championships
- 13
- Consensus All-Americans: 80
- Rivalries: DePauw (rivalry)
- Fight song: "Old Wabash!"
- Website: wabash.edu/football

The Wabash Little Giants football team represents Wabash College in the sport of college football at the NCAA Division III level. The Little Giants have competed as a member of the North Coast Athletic Conference (NCAC) since 2000. Wabash plays home games at Hollett Little Giant Stadium in Crawfordsville, Indiana. Don Morel served as the team's head coach from 2016 to 2024, amassing a 61–20 record overall and a 54–15 record in conference play. Jake Gilbert (Wabash '98) will take over as head coach for the 2025 season.

== History ==
In 1884, Wabash played its first game of intercollegiate football when it defeated a team from Butler University on October 25, 4–0. The first intercollegiate game in the state took place on May 31, between Butler and DePauw University. From the 1890s to the 1910s, the Wabash football team played schedules against many much larger colleges, such as Illinois, Indiana and Purdue, against whom the Little Giants occasionally won impressive upsets. For instance Wabash won all five games against Purdue between 1906 and 1911.

In 1903, the Wabash football team fielded its first black player, Samuel S. Gordon, and the following season added another, Walter M. Cantrell. Many opposing teams threatened boycotts, but school president William Patterson Kane insisted the men be allowed to play. Some opponents did cancel their games, but Gordon and Cantrell continued to play for Wabash. The 1904 football team adopted the nickname the "Little Giants", which was the first time that moniker was used by the school. That season, Wabash won decisive victories over Hanover, 81–0, Butler, 51–0, and Earlham, 35–0, and they lost close contests to Illinois, Notre Dame, Purdue, and Michigan Agricultural (Michigan State).

The Little Giants' most prominent football game came against Notre Dame at South Bend, Indiana on October 21, 1905. Wabash took a first-half lead, 5–0, through a dominating performance by their backfield and linemen. In the second half, Notre Dame advanced inside the Wabash five-yard line three times, but was repelled on each occasion. The Little Giants won, 5–0, and it proved the only Notre Dame home-field loss in 125 games between 1899 and 1928. The Little Giants and Fighting Irish played several more times after that, and the last game took place in 1924. Incidentally, both head coaches that season, Pete Vaughan of Wabash and Knute Rockne of Notre Dame, had played college football together for the Fighting Irish. A further connection between the schools was College Football Hall of Fame inductee Jesse Harper, who coached Wabash from 1909 to 1912, and then Notre Dame from 1913 to 1917. Century Milstead played for the 1921 team.

== Postseason appearances ==
=== NCAA Division III playoffs ===
The Little Giants have made ten appearances in the NCAA Division III playoffs, with a combined record of 13–10.

Year	Round	Opponent	Result
1977	First Round; Semifinals; Stagg Bowl	Saint John's (MN); Minnesota–Morris; Widener	W, 20–9; W, 37–21; L, 36–39
2002	First Round; Second Round; Quarterfinals	MacMurray; Wittenberg; Mount Union	W, 42–7; W, 25–14; L, 16–45
2005	First Round; Second Round	Albion; Capital	W, 38–20; L, 11–14
2007	First Round; Second Round; Quarterfinals	Mount St. Joseph; Case Western Reserve; Wisconsin–Whitewater	W, 31–21; W, 38–23; L, 7–47
2008	First Round; Second Round	Case Western Reserve; Wheaton (IL)	W, 20–17; L, 28–59
2009	First Round	Illinois Wesleyan	L, 35–41
2011	First Round; Second Round; Quarterfinals	Illinois College; North Central (IL); Mount Union	W, 38–20; W, 29–28; L, 8–20
2014	First Round; Second Round	Franklin; Wisconsin–Whitewater	W, 33–14; L, 14–38
2015	First Round; Second Round; Quarterfinals	Albion; Thomas More; St. Thomas (MN)	W, 35–14; W, 33–27 ^{OT} L, 7–38
2019	First Round	North Central (IL)	L, 15–51
