= 1915 college football rankings =

- Season: 1915
- Bowl season: 1915–16 bowl games
- End of season champions: Harvard

The 1915 college football season rankings included a championship selection by The New York Times.

== The New York Times ==
In December 1915, The New York Times listed Cornell as football's top team in an end-of-year listing of champions in all sports.

Rank	Team	Record
1	Cornell	9–0

== See also ==
- 1915 College Football All-America Team
