= 1915 Penn State Nittany Lions football team =

American college football season

1915 Penn State Nittany Lions football
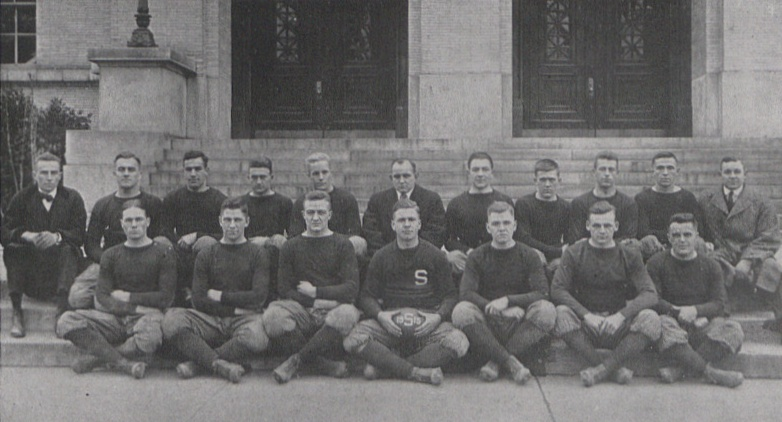
- Conference: Independent
- Record: 7–2
- Head coach: Dick Harlow (1st season)
- Captain: Bill Wood
- Home stadium: New Beaver Field

1915 Eastern college football independents records
	Conf.			Overall
Team	W	L	T	W		L		T
Cornell		–		9	–	0	–	0
Pittsburgh		–		8	–	0	–	0
Columbia		–		5	–	0	–	0
Harvard		–		8	–	1	–	0
Carnegie Tech		–		7	–	1	–	0
Rutgers		–		7	–	1	–	0
Villanova		–		6	–	1	–	0
Washington & Jefferson		–		8	–	1	–	1
Colgate		–		5	–	1	–	0
Syracuse		–		9	–	1	–	2
Dartmouth		–		7	–	1	–	1
Tufts		–		5	–	1	–	2
Penn State		–		7	–	2	–	0
Lafayette		–		8	–	3	–	0
Princeton		–		6	–	2	–	0
Franklin & Marshall		–		6	–	2	–	0
Temple		–		3	–	1	–	1
Geneva		–		6	–	3	–	0
Wesleyan		–		6	–	3	–	0
Allegheny		–		5	–	3	–	0
Swarthmore		–		5	–	3	–	0
Army		–		5	–	3	–	1
Lehigh		–		6	–	4	–	0
Holy Cross		–		3	–	2	–	2
Brown		–		5	–	4	–	1
Fordham		–		4	–	4	–	0
NYU		–		4	–	4	–	1
Middlebury		–		3	–	4	–	2
Muhlenberg		–		4	–	5	–	0
Yale		–		4	–	5	–	0
Boston College		–		3	–	4	–	0
Penn		–		3	–	5	–	2
WPI		–		3	–	5	–	1
Buffalo		–		3	–	5	–	0
Carlisle		–		3	–	6	–	2
Rhode Island State		–		3	–	5	–	0
New Hampshire		–		3	–	6	–	1
Gettysburg		–		3	–	6	–	0
Rochester		–		3	–	6	–	0
Bucknell		–		2	–	6	–	3
Vermont		–		1	–	4	–	2
Williams		–		1	–	7	–	0

The 1915 Penn State Nittany Lions football team represented the Pennsylvania State University as an independent during the 1915 college football season. The season was the first coached by Dick Harlow, with Lawrence Whitney as an assistant coach. The Nittany Lions played their home games in New Beaver Field in State College, Pennsylvania.

== Schedule ==
Date	Opponent	Site	Result	Attendance	Source
September 25	Westminster (PA)	New Beaver Field; State College, PA	W 26–0		
October 2	Lebanon Valley	New Beaver Field; State College, PA	W 13–0		
October 9	at Penn	Franklin Field; Philadelphia, PA	W 13–3		
October 16	Gettysburg	New Beaver Field; State College, PA	W 27–12		
October 23	West Virginia Wesleyan	New Beaver Field; State College, PA	W 28–0		
October 30	at Harvard	Harvard Stadium; Boston, MA	L 0–13	22,000	
November 5	Lehigh	New Beaver Field; State College, PA	W 7–0		
November 13	at Lafayette	March Field; Easton, PA	W 33–3		
November 25	at Pittsburgh	Forbes Field; Pittsburgh, PA (rivalry)	L 0–20	30,000	
