= 1915 Bucknell football team =

American college football season

1915 Bucknell football
- Conference: Independent
- Record: 2–6–3
- Head coach: George Johnson (1st season)

1915 Eastern college football independents records
	Conf.			Overall
Team	W	L	T	W		L		T
Cornell		–		9	–	0	–	0
Pittsburgh		–		8	–	0	–	0
Columbia		–		5	–	0	–	0
Harvard		–		8	–	1	–	0
Carnegie Tech		–		7	–	1	–	0
Rutgers		–		7	–	1	–	0
Villanova		–		6	–	1	–	0
Washington & Jefferson		–		8	–	1	–	1
Colgate		–		5	–	1	–	0
Syracuse		–		9	–	1	–	2
Dartmouth		–		7	–	1	–	1
Tufts		–		5	–	1	–	2
Penn State		–		7	–	2	–	0
Lafayette		–		8	–	3	–	0
Princeton		–		6	–	2	–	0
Franklin & Marshall		–		6	–	2	–	0
Temple		–		3	–	1	–	1
Geneva		–		6	–	3	–	0
Wesleyan		–		6	–	3	–	0
Allegheny		–		5	–	3	–	0
Swarthmore		–		5	–	3	–	0
Army		–		5	–	3	–	1
Lehigh		–		6	–	4	–	0
Holy Cross		–		3	–	2	–	2
Brown		–		5	–	4	–	1
Fordham		–		4	–	4	–	0
NYU		–		4	–	4	–	1
Middlebury		–		3	–	4	–	2
Muhlenberg		–		4	–	5	–	0
Yale		–		4	–	5	–	0
Boston College		–		3	–	4	–	0
Penn		–		3	–	5	–	2
WPI		–		3	–	5	–	1
Buffalo		–		3	–	5	–	0
Carlisle		–		3	–	6	–	2
Rhode Island State		–		3	–	5	–	0
New Hampshire		–		3	–	6	–	1
Gettysburg		–		3	–	6	–	0
Rochester		–		3	–	6	–	0
Bucknell		–		2	–	6	–	3
Vermont		–		1	–	4	–	2
Williams		–		1	–	7	–	0

The 1915 Bucknell football team was an American football team that represented Bucknell University as an independent during the 1915 college football season. In its first season under head coach George Johnson, the team compiled a 2–6–3 record.

== Schedule ==
Date	Opponent	Site	Result	Attendance	Source
September 18	Bloomsburg Normal	Lewisburg, PA	W 14–0		
September 25	Susquehanna	Lewisburg, PA	T 0–0		
October 2	at Syracuse	Archbold Stadium; Syracuse, NY	L 0–6		
October 9	Swarthmore	Lewisburg, PA	L 0–3		
October 16	at Cornell	Schoellkopf Field; Ithaca, NY	L 0–41		
October 23	at Carlisle	Indian Field; Carlisle, PA	T 0–0		
October 30	Muhlenberg	Lewisburg, PA	L 0–3		
November 2	at NYU	Ohio Field; Bronx, NY	T 3–3		
November 6	at Navy	Worden Field; Annapolis, MD	L 3–13		
November 13	vs. Gettysburg	Island Park; Harrisburg, PA	W 16–7	3,000	
November 25	Lebanon Valley	Lewisburg, PA	L 0–3		
