= 1915 Army Cadets football team =

American college football season

1915 Army Cadets football
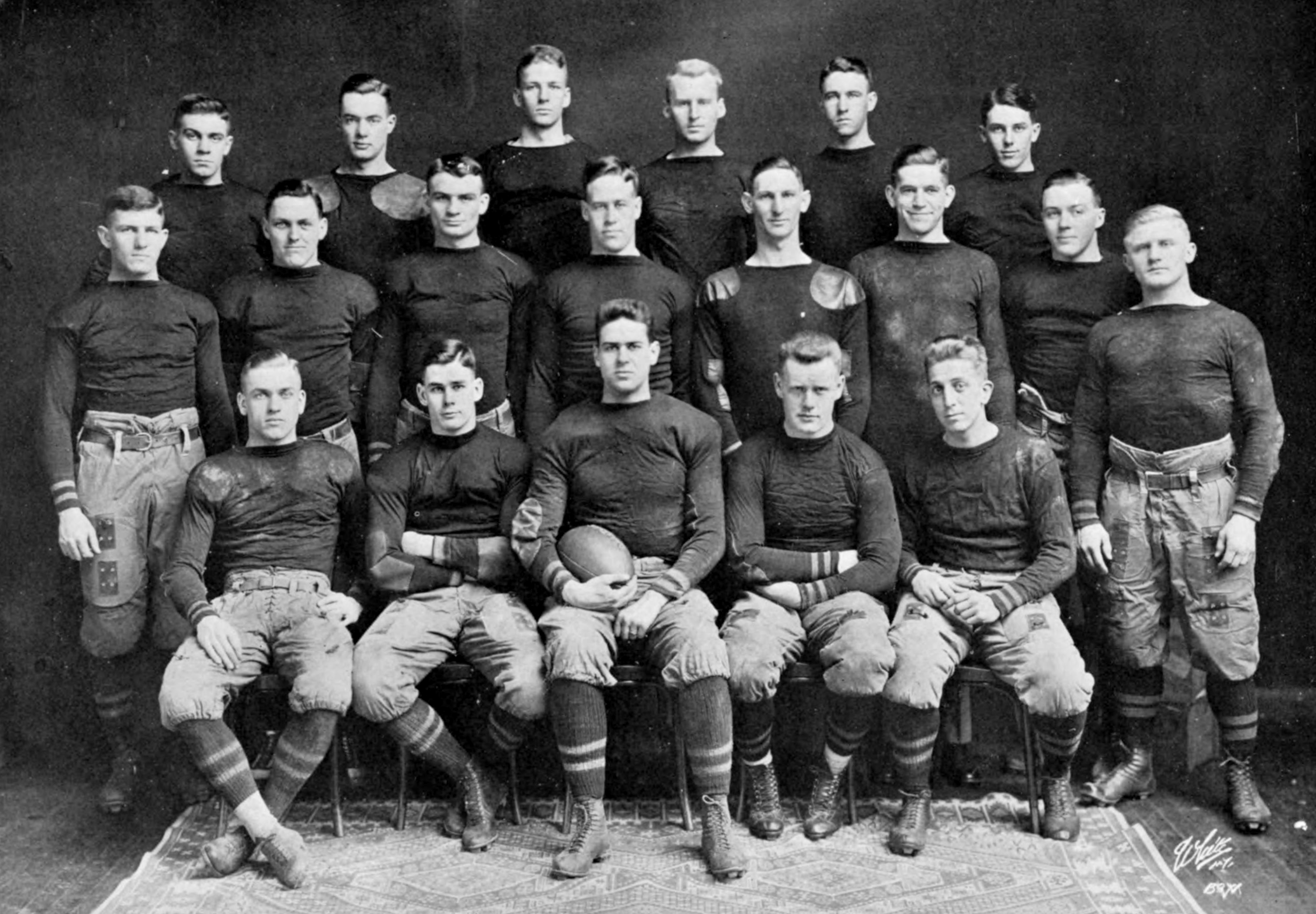
- Conference: Independent
- Record: 5–3–1
- Head coach: Charles Dudley Daly (3rd season)
- Captain: Alex Weyand
- Home stadium: The Plain

1915 Eastern college football independents records
	Conf.			Overall
Team	W	L	T	W		L		T
Cornell		–		9	–	0	–	0
Pittsburgh		–		8	–	0	–	0
Columbia		–		5	–	0	–	0
Harvard		–		8	–	1	–	0
Carnegie Tech		–		7	–	1	–	0
Rutgers		–		7	–	1	–	0
Villanova		–		6	–	1	–	0
Washington & Jefferson		–		8	–	1	–	1
Colgate		–		5	–	1	–	0
Syracuse		–		9	–	1	–	2
Dartmouth		–		7	–	1	–	1
Tufts		–		5	–	1	–	2
Penn State		–		7	–	2	–	0
Lafayette		–		8	–	3	–	0
Princeton		–		6	–	2	–	0
Franklin & Marshall		–		6	–	2	–	0
Temple		–		3	–	1	–	1
Geneva		–		6	–	3	–	0
Wesleyan		–		6	–	3	–	0
Allegheny		–		5	–	3	–	0
Swarthmore		–		5	–	3	–	0
Army		–		5	–	3	–	1
Lehigh		–		6	–	4	–	0
Holy Cross		–		3	–	2	–	2
Brown		–		5	–	4	–	1
Fordham		–		4	–	4	–	0
NYU		–		4	–	4	–	1
Middlebury		–		3	–	4	–	2
Muhlenberg		–		4	–	5	–	0
Yale		–		4	–	5	–	0
Boston College		–		3	–	4	–	0
Penn		–		3	–	5	–	2
WPI		–		3	–	5	–	1
Buffalo		–		3	–	5	–	0
Carlisle		–		3	–	6	–	2
Rhode Island State		–		3	–	5	–	0
New Hampshire		–		3	–	6	–	1
Gettysburg		–		3	–	6	–	0
Rochester		–		3	–	6	–	0
Bucknell		–		2	–	6	–	3
Vermont		–		1	–	4	–	2
Williams		–		1	–	7	–	0

The 1915 Army Cadets football team represented the United States Military Academy as an independent during the 1915 college football season. In their third season under head coach Charles Dudley Daly, the Cadets compiled a 5–3–1 record, shut out four of their nine opponents, and outscored all opponents by a combined total of 114 to 57. In the annual Army–Navy Game, the Cadets won 14–0.

Three Army players were recognized on the All-America team. Fullback Elmer Oliphant was selected as a first-team player by Walter Camp, Monty, and Damon Runyon. Center John McEwan was selected as a first-team All-American by Damon Runyon and a second-team player by Monty. Tackle Alex Weyand was selected as a second-team player by Monty and a third-team player by Walter Camp.

== Schedule ==
Date	Opponent	Site	Result	Source
October 2	Holy Cross	The Plain; West Point, NY	T 14–14	
October 9	Gettysburg	The Plain; West Point, NY	W 22–0	
October 16	Colgate	The Plain; West Point, NY	L 0–13	
October 23	Georgetown	The Plain; West Point, NY	W 10–0	
October 30	Villanova	The Plain; West Point, NY	L 13–16	
November 6	Notre Dame	The Plain; West Point, NY (rivalry)	L 0–7	
November 13	Maine	The Plain; West Point, NY	W 24–0	
November 20	Springfield YMCA	The Plain; West Point, NY	W 17–7	
November 27	vs. Navy	Polo Grounds; New York, NY (Army–Navy Game)	W 14–0	
