= 1915 Dartmouth football team =

American college football season

1915 Dartmouth football
- Conference: Independent
- Record: 7–1–1
- Head coach: Frank Cavanaugh (5th season)
- Captain: John B. McAuliffe

1915 Eastern college football independents records
	Conf.			Overall
Team	W	L	T	W		L		T
Cornell		–		9	–	0	–	0
Pittsburgh		–		8	–	0	–	0
Columbia		–		5	–	0	–	0
Harvard		–		8	–	1	–	0
Carnegie Tech		–		7	–	1	–	0
Rutgers		–		7	–	1	–	0
Villanova		–		6	–	1	–	0
Washington & Jefferson		–		8	–	1	–	1
Colgate		–		5	–	1	–	0
Syracuse		–		9	–	1	–	2
Dartmouth		–		7	–	1	–	1
Tufts		–		5	–	1	–	2
Penn State		–		7	–	2	–	0
Lafayette		–		8	–	3	–	0
Princeton		–		6	–	2	–	0
Franklin & Marshall		–		6	–	2	–	0
Temple		–		3	–	1	–	1
Geneva		–		6	–	3	–	0
Wesleyan		–		6	–	3	–	0
Allegheny		–		5	–	3	–	0
Swarthmore		–		5	–	3	–	0
Army		–		5	–	3	–	1
Lehigh		–		6	–	4	–	0
Holy Cross		–		3	–	2	–	2
Brown		–		5	–	4	–	1
Fordham		–		4	–	4	–	0
NYU		–		4	–	4	–	1
Middlebury		–		3	–	4	–	2
Muhlenberg		–		4	–	5	–	0
Yale		–		4	–	5	–	0
Boston College		–		3	–	4	–	0
Penn		–		3	–	5	–	2
WPI		–		3	–	5	–	1
Buffalo		–		3	–	5	–	0
Carlisle		–		3	–	6	–	2
Rhode Island State		–		3	–	5	–	0
New Hampshire		–		3	–	6	–	1
Gettysburg		–		3	–	6	–	0
Rochester		–		3	–	6	–	0
Bucknell		–		2	–	6	–	3
Vermont		–		1	–	4	–	2
Williams		–		1	–	7	–	0

The 1915 Dartmouth football team was an American football team that represented Dartmouth College as an independent during the 1915 college football season. In its fifth season under head coach Frank Cavanaugh, the team compiled a 7–1–1 record and outscored opponents by a total of 194 to 40. John B. McAuliffe was the team captain.

== Schedule ==
Date	Opponent	Site	Result	Source
September 26	Massachusetts	Hanover, NH	W 13–0	
October 2	Maine	Hanover, NH	W 32–0	
October 9	Tufts	Hanover, NH	W 20–7	
October 16	Vermont	Hanover, NH	W 60–0	
October 23	at Princeton	Palmer Stadium; Princeton, NJ	L 7–30	
October 30	at Amherst	Amherst, MA	W 26–0	
November 6	vs. Penn	Fenway Park; Boston, MA	W 7–3	
November 13	Bates	Hanover, NH	W 29–0	
November 20	at Syracuse	Archbold Stadium; Syracuse, NY	T 0–0	
