= 1915 Carlisle Indians football team =

American college football season

1915 Carlisle Indians football
- Conference: Independent
- Record: 3–6–2
- Head coach: Victor Kelly (1st season)
- Home stadium: Indian Field

1915 Eastern college football independents records
	Conf.			Overall
Team	W	L	T	W		L		T
Cornell		–		9	–	0	–	0
Pittsburgh		–		8	–	0	–	0
Columbia		–		5	–	0	–	0
Harvard		–		8	–	1	–	0
Carnegie Tech		–		7	–	1	–	0
Rutgers		–		7	–	1	–	0
Villanova		–		6	–	1	–	0
Washington & Jefferson		–		8	–	1	–	1
Colgate		–		5	–	1	–	0
Syracuse		–		9	–	1	–	2
Dartmouth		–		7	–	1	–	1
Tufts		–		5	–	1	–	2
Penn State		–		7	–	2	–	0
Lafayette		–		8	–	3	–	0
Princeton		–		6	–	2	–	0
Franklin & Marshall		–		6	–	2	–	0
Temple		–		3	–	1	–	1
Geneva		–		6	–	3	–	0
Wesleyan		–		6	–	3	–	0
Allegheny		–		5	–	3	–	0
Swarthmore		–		5	–	3	–	0
Army		–		5	–	3	–	1
Lehigh		–		6	–	4	–	0
Holy Cross		–		3	–	2	–	2
Brown		–		5	–	4	–	1
Fordham		–		4	–	4	–	0
NYU		–		4	–	4	–	1
Middlebury		–		3	–	4	–	2
Muhlenberg		–		4	–	5	–	0
Yale		–		4	–	5	–	0
Boston College		–		3	–	4	–	0
Penn		–		3	–	5	–	2
WPI		–		3	–	5	–	1
Buffalo		–		3	–	5	–	0
Carlisle		–		3	–	6	–	2
Rhode Island State		–		3	–	5	–	0
New Hampshire		–		3	–	6	–	1
Gettysburg		–		3	–	6	–	0
Rochester		–		3	–	6	–	0
Bucknell		–		2	–	6	–	3
Vermont		–		1	–	4	–	2
Williams		–		1	–	7	–	0

The 1915 Carlisle Indians football team represented the Carlisle Indian Industrial School as an independent during the 1915 college football season. Led by Victor Kelly in his first and only season as head coach, the Indians compiled a record of 3–6–2 and were outscored opponents 196 to 85.

== Schedule ==
Date	Opponent	Site	Result	Source
September 18	Albright	Carlisle, PA	W 21–0	
September 25	Lebanon Valley	Carlisle, PA	T 0–0	
October 2	at Lehigh	Taylor Stadium; Bethlehem, PA	L 0–14	
October 9	at Harvard	Harvard Stadium; Boston, MA	L 7–29	
October 16	at Pittsburgh	Forbes Field; Pittsburgh, PA	L 0–45	
October 23	Bucknell	Indian Field; Carlisle, PA	T 0–0	
October 30	West Virginia Wesleyan	Carlisle, PA	L 0–14	
November 6	at Holy Cross	Fitton Field; Worcester, MA	W 23–21	
November 13	Dickinson	Carlisle, PA	W 21–14	
November 20	at Fordham	Fordham Field; Bronx, NY	L 10–14	
November 27	at Brown	Andrews Field; Providence, RI	L 3–39	
