= 1915 Massachusetts Aggies football team =

American college football season

1915 Massachusetts Aggies football
- Conference: Athletic League of New England State Colleges
- Record: 4–2–2 ( Athletic League of New England State Colleges)
- Head coach: Arthur Brides (4th season)
- Home stadium: Alumni Field

The 1915 Massachusetts Aggies football team represented Massachusetts Agricultural College in the 1915 college football season. The team was coached by Arthur Brides and played its home games at Alumni Field in Amherst, Massachusetts. The 1915 season was Brides's last as head coach of the Aggies. Massachusetts finished the season with a record of 4–2–2.

== Schedule ==
Date	Opponent	Site	Result	Source
September 25	at Dartmouth	Alumni Oval; Hanover, NH	L 0–13	
October 2	at Harvard	Harvard Stadium; Boston, MA	L 0–7	
October 9	Colby	Alumni Field; Amherst, MA	W 26–0	
October 16	at Holy Cross	Fitton Field; Worcester, MA	T 7–7	
October 23	at Worcester Tech	Alumni Field; Worcester, MA	W 27–0	
October 30	at Tufts	Tufts Oval; Somerville, MA	T 14–14	
November 6	Middlebury	Alumni Field; Amherst, MA	W 25–0	
November 13	at Springfield YMCA	Pratt Field; Springfield, MA	W 14–13	
