= 1915 Harvard Crimson football team =

American college football season

1915 Harvard Crimson football
- Conference: Independent
- Record: 8–1
- Head coach: Percy Haughton (8th season)
- Captain: Eddie Mahan
- Home stadium: Harvard Stadium

1915 Eastern college football independents records
	Conf.			Overall
Team	W	L	T	W		L		T
Cornell		–		9	–	0	–	0
Pittsburgh		–		8	–	0	–	0
Columbia		–		5	–	0	–	0
Harvard		–		8	–	1	–	0
Carnegie Tech		–		7	–	1	–	0
Rutgers		–		7	–	1	–	0
Villanova		–		6	–	1	–	0
Washington & Jefferson		–		8	–	1	–	1
Colgate		–		5	–	1	–	0
Syracuse		–		9	–	1	–	2
Dartmouth		–		7	–	1	–	1
Tufts		–		5	–	1	–	2
Penn State		–		7	–	2	–	0
Lafayette		–		8	–	3	–	0
Princeton		–		6	–	2	–	0
Franklin & Marshall		–		6	–	2	–	0
Temple		–		3	–	1	–	1
Geneva		–		6	–	3	–	0
Wesleyan		–		6	–	3	–	0
Allegheny		–		5	–	3	–	0
Swarthmore		–		5	–	3	–	0
Army		–		5	–	3	–	1
Lehigh		–		6	–	4	–	0
Holy Cross		–		3	–	2	–	2
Brown		–		5	–	4	–	1
Fordham		–		4	–	4	–	0
NYU		–		4	–	4	–	1
Middlebury		–		3	–	4	–	2
Muhlenberg		–		4	–	5	–	0
Yale		–		4	–	5	–	0
Boston College		–		3	–	4	–	0
Penn		–		3	–	5	–	2
WPI		–		3	–	5	–	1
Buffalo		–		3	–	5	–	0
Carlisle		–		3	–	6	–	2
Rhode Island State		–		3	–	5	–	0
New Hampshire		–		3	–	6	–	1
Gettysburg		–		3	–	6	–	0
Rochester		–		3	–	6	–	0
Bucknell		–		2	–	6	–	3
Vermont		–		1	–	4	–	2
Williams		–		1	–	7	–	0

The 1915 Harvard Crimson football team represented Harvard University in the 1915 college football season. The Crimson finished with an 8–1 record under eighth-year head coach Percy Haughton. The sole loss was a 10–0 defeat against Cornell. Walter Camp selected three Harvard players (tackle Joseph Gilman, halfback Richard King and fullback Eddie Mahan) as first-team members of his 1915 College Football All-America Team.

== Schedule ==
Date	Opponent	Site	Result	Attendance	Source
September 25	Colby	Harvard Stadium; Boston, MA	W 39–6		
October 2	Massachusetts	Harvard Stadium; Boston, MA	W 7–0		
October 9	Carlisle	Harvard Stadium; Boston, MA	W 29–7		
October 16	Virginia	Harvard Stadium; Boston, MA	W 9–0		
October 23	Cornell	Harvard Stadium; Boston, MA	L 0–10	25,000	
October 30	Penn State	Harvard Stadium; Boston, MA	W 13–0	22,000	
November 6	at Princeton	Palmer Stadium; Princeton, NJ (rivalry)	W 10–6		
November 13	Brown	Harvard Stadium; Boston, MA	W 16–7		
November 20	Yale	Harvard Stadium; Boston, MA (rivalry)	W 41–0	49,000	
