= 1915 Syracuse Orangemen football team =

American college football season

1915 Syracuse Orangemen football
- Conference: Independent
- Record: 9–1–2
- Head coach: Frank "Buck" O'Neill (5th season)
- Captain: Tam Rose
- Home stadium: Archbold Stadium

1915 Eastern college football independents records
	Conf.			Overall
Team	W	L	T	W		L		T
Cornell		–		9	–	0	–	0
Pittsburgh		–		8	–	0	–	0
Columbia		–		5	–	0	–	0
Harvard		–		8	–	1	–	0
Carnegie Tech		–		7	–	1	–	0
Rutgers		–		7	–	1	–	0
Villanova		–		6	–	1	–	0
Washington & Jefferson		–		8	–	1	–	1
Colgate		–		5	–	1	–	0
Syracuse		–		9	–	1	–	2
Dartmouth		–		7	–	1	–	1
Tufts		–		5	–	1	–	2
Penn State		–		7	–	2	–	0
Lafayette		–		8	–	3	–	0
Princeton		–		6	–	2	–	0
Franklin & Marshall		–		6	–	2	–	0
Temple		–		3	–	1	–	1
Geneva		–		6	–	3	–	0
Wesleyan		–		6	–	3	–	0
Allegheny		–		5	–	3	–	0
Swarthmore		–		5	–	3	–	0
Army		–		5	–	3	–	1
Lehigh		–		6	–	4	–	0
Holy Cross		–		3	–	2	–	2
Brown		–		5	–	4	–	1
Fordham		–		4	–	4	–	0
NYU		–		4	–	4	–	1
Middlebury		–		3	–	4	–	2
Muhlenberg		–		4	–	5	–	0
Yale		–		4	–	5	–	0
Boston College		–		3	–	4	–	0
Penn		–		3	–	5	–	2
WPI		–		3	–	5	–	1
Buffalo		–		3	–	5	–	0
Carlisle		–		3	–	6	–	2
Rhode Island State		–		3	–	5	–	0
New Hampshire		–		3	–	6	–	1
Gettysburg		–		3	–	6	–	0
Rochester		–		3	–	6	–	0
Bucknell		–		2	–	6	–	3
Vermont		–		1	–	4	–	2
Williams		–		1	–	7	–	0

The 1915 Syracuse Orangemen football team represented Syracuse University as an independent during the 1915 college football season. Led by fifth-year head coach Frank "Buck" O'Neill, the Orangemen compiled a record of 9–1–2. The team played home games at Archbold Stadium in Syracuse, New York.

== Schedule ==
Date	Opponent	Site	Result	Attendance	Source
September 25	All-Syracuse	Archbold Stadium; Syracuse, NY	W 43–0		
October 2	Bucknell	Archbold Stadium; Syracuse, NY	W 6–0		
October 9	at Princeton	Palmer Stadium; Princeton, NJ	L 0–3	5,000	
October 16	Rochester	Archbold Stadium; Syracuse, NY	W 82–0	5,000	
October 23	at Brown	Andrews Field; Providence, RI	W 6–0		
October 30	at Michigan	Ferry Field; Ann Arbor, MI	W 14–7		
November 6	Mount Union	Archbold Stadium; Syracuse, NY	W 73–0		
November 13	Colgate	Archbold Stadium; Syracuse, NY (rivalry)	W 38–0	25,000	
November 20	Dartmouth	Archbold Stadium; Syracuse, NY	T 0–0		
November 25	at Montana	Dornblaser Field; Missoula, MT	T 6–6		
December 1	vs. Oregon Agricultural	Multnomah Field; Portland, OR	W 28–0	8,000–10,000	
December 6	at Occidental	Los Angeles, CA	W 35–0	5,000	
