= 1915 Villanova Wildcats football team =

American college football season

1915 Villanova Wildcats football
- Conference: Independent
- Record: 6–1
- Head coach: Dutch Sommer (2nd season)
- Captain: Patrick Reagan
- Home stadium: none

1915 Eastern college football independents records
	Conf.			Overall
Team	W	L	T	W		L		T
Cornell		–		9	–	0	–	0
Pittsburgh		–		8	–	0	–	0
Columbia		–		5	–	0	–	0
Harvard		–		8	–	1	–	0
Carnegie Tech		–		7	–	1	–	0
Rutgers		–		7	–	1	–	0
Villanova		–		6	–	1	–	0
Washington & Jefferson		–		8	–	1	–	1
Colgate		–		5	–	1	–	0
Syracuse		–		9	–	1	–	2
Dartmouth		–		7	–	1	–	1
Tufts		–		5	–	1	–	2
Penn State		–		7	–	2	–	0
Lafayette		–		8	–	3	–	0
Princeton		–		6	–	2	–	0
Franklin & Marshall		–		6	–	2	–	0
Temple		–		3	–	1	–	1
Geneva		–		6	–	3	–	0
Wesleyan		–		6	–	3	–	0
Allegheny		–		5	–	3	–	0
Swarthmore		–		5	–	3	–	0
Army		–		5	–	3	–	1
Lehigh		–		6	–	4	–	0
Holy Cross		–		3	–	2	–	2
Brown		–		5	–	4	–	1
Fordham		–		4	–	4	–	0
NYU		–		4	–	4	–	1
Middlebury		–		3	–	4	–	2
Muhlenberg		–		4	–	5	–	0
Yale		–		4	–	5	–	0
Boston College		–		3	–	4	–	0
Penn		–		3	–	5	–	2
WPI		–		3	–	5	–	1
Buffalo		–		3	–	5	–	0
Carlisle		–		3	–	6	–	2
Rhode Island State		–		3	–	5	–	0
New Hampshire		–		3	–	6	–	1
Gettysburg		–		3	–	6	–	0
Rochester		–		3	–	6	–	0
Bucknell		–		2	–	6	–	3
Vermont		–		1	–	4	–	2
Williams		–		1	–	7	–	0

The 1915 Villanova Wildcats football team represented the Villanova University during the 1915 college football season. The Wildcats team captain was Patrick Regan.

== Schedule ==
Date	Opponent	Site	Result	Attendance	Source
October 2	at Muhlenberg	Allentown, PA	W 9–6		
October 9	at Ursinus	Collegeville, PA	W 3–0		
October 16	Lebanon Valley	Villanova, PA	W 14–0		
October 23	at Catholic University	Washington, DC	L 6–10		
November 8	at Army	The Plain; West Point, NY	W 16–13		
November 13	at Swarthmore	Swarthmore, PA	W 19–0		
November 25	at Fordham	Fordham Field; Bronx, NY	W 33–0	4,000	
