= 1915 Franklin & Marshall Nevonians football team =

American college football season

1915 Franklin & Marshall Nevonians football
- Conference: Independent
- Record: 6–2
- Head coach: John M. Reed (1st season)
- Captain: Edward Mylin
- Home stadium: Williamson Field

1915 Eastern college football independents records
	Conf.			Overall
Team	W	L	T	W		L		T
Cornell		–		9	–	0	–	0
Pittsburgh		–		8	–	0	–	0
Columbia		–		5	–	0	–	0
Harvard		–		8	–	1	–	0
Carnegie Tech		–		7	–	1	–	0
Rutgers		–		7	–	1	–	0
Villanova		–		6	–	1	–	0
Washington & Jefferson		–		8	–	1	–	1
Colgate		–		5	–	1	–	0
Syracuse		–		9	–	1	–	2
Dartmouth		–		7	–	1	–	1
Tufts		–		5	–	1	–	2
Penn State		–		7	–	2	–	0
Lafayette		–		8	–	3	–	0
Princeton		–		6	–	2	–	0
Franklin & Marshall		–		6	–	2	–	0
Temple		–		3	–	1	–	1
Geneva		–		6	–	3	–	0
Wesleyan		–		6	–	3	–	0
Allegheny		–		5	–	3	–	0
Swarthmore		–		5	–	3	–	0
Army		–		5	–	3	–	1
Lehigh		–		6	–	4	–	0
Holy Cross		–		3	–	2	–	2
Brown		–		5	–	4	–	1
Fordham		–		4	–	4	–	0
NYU		–		4	–	4	–	1
Middlebury		–		3	–	4	–	2
Muhlenberg		–		4	–	5	–	0
Yale		–		4	–	5	–	0
Boston College		–		3	–	4	–	0
Penn		–		3	–	5	–	2
WPI		–		3	–	5	–	1
Buffalo		–		3	–	5	–	0
Carlisle		–		3	–	6	–	2
Rhode Island State		–		3	–	5	–	0
New Hampshire		–		3	–	6	–	1
Gettysburg		–		3	–	6	–	0
Rochester		–		3	–	6	–	0
Bucknell		–		2	–	6	–	3
Vermont		–		1	–	4	–	2
Williams		–		1	–	7	–	0

The 1915 Franklin & Marshall Nevonians football team was an American football team that represented Franklin & Marshall College during the 1915 college football season. The team compiled a 6–2 record and outscored opponents by a total of 188 to 43. John M. Reed was the head coach.

== Schedule ==
Date	Opponent	Site	Result	Attendance	Source
October 2	at Penn	Franklin Field; Philadelphia, PA	L 6–10		
October 9	St. John's (MD)	Williamson Field; Lancaster, PA	W 48–0		
October 16	Dickinson	Williamson Field; Lancaster, PA (rivalry)	W 19–0		
October 23	at Swarthmore	Whittier Field; Swarthmore, PA (rivalry)	W 21–7		
October 30	Susquehanna	Williamson Field; Lancaster, PA	W 53–0		
November 6	Haverford	Williamson Field; Lancaster, PA	W 13–0		
November 13	Ursinus	Williamson Field; Lancaster, PA	W 20–13		
November 25	Gettysburg	Williamson Field; Lancaster, PA (rivalry)	L 8–13	5,000–6,000	
