= 1915 Yale Bulldogs football team =

American college football season

1915 Yale Bulldogs football
- Conference: Independent
- Record: 4–5
- Head coach: Frank Hinkey (2nd season)
- Captain: Alexander D. Wilson
- Home stadium: Yale Bowl

1915 Eastern college football independents records
	Conf.			Overall
Team	W	L	T	W		L		T
Cornell		–		9	–	0	–	0
Pittsburgh		–		8	–	0	–	0
Columbia		–		5	–	0	–	0
Harvard		–		8	–	1	–	0
Carnegie Tech		–		7	–	1	–	0
Rutgers		–		7	–	1	–	0
Villanova		–		6	–	1	–	0
Washington & Jefferson		–		8	–	1	–	1
Colgate		–		5	–	1	–	0
Syracuse		–		9	–	1	–	2
Dartmouth		–		7	–	1	–	1
Tufts		–		5	–	1	–	2
Penn State		–		7	–	2	–	0
Lafayette		–		8	–	3	–	0
Princeton		–		6	–	2	–	0
Franklin & Marshall		–		6	–	2	–	0
Temple		–		3	–	1	–	1
Geneva		–		6	–	3	–	0
Wesleyan		–		6	–	3	–	0
Allegheny		–		5	–	3	–	0
Swarthmore		–		5	–	3	–	0
Army		–		5	–	3	–	1
Lehigh		–		6	–	4	–	0
Holy Cross		–		3	–	2	–	2
Brown		–		5	–	4	–	1
Fordham		–		4	–	4	–	0
NYU		–		4	–	4	–	1
Middlebury		–		3	–	4	–	2
Muhlenberg		–		4	–	5	–	0
Yale		–		4	–	5	–	0
Boston College		–		3	–	4	–	0
Penn		–		3	–	5	–	2
WPI		–		3	–	5	–	1
Buffalo		–		3	–	5	–	0
Carlisle		–		3	–	6	–	2
Rhode Island State		–		3	–	5	–	0
New Hampshire		–		3	–	6	–	1
Gettysburg		–		3	–	6	–	0
Rochester		–		3	–	6	–	0
Bucknell		–		2	–	6	–	3
Vermont		–		1	–	4	–	2
Williams		–		1	–	7	–	0

The 1915 Yale Bulldogs football team was an American football team that represented Yale University as an independent during the 1915 college football season. The Bulldogs finished with a 4–5 record under second-year head coach Frank Hinkey. It was the first losing season in Yale Bulldogs football history. No Yale player was a consensus All-American, though guard Clinton Black was selected as a first-team player by New York sports writer Monty on his 1915 College Football All-America Team.

== Schedule ==
Date	Opponent	Site	Result	Attendance	Source
September 25	Maine	Yale Bowl; New Haven, CT	W 37–0		
October 2	Virginia	Yale Bowl; New Haven, CT	L 0–10		
October 9	Lehigh	Yale Bowl; New Haven, CT	W 7–6		
October 16	Springfield	Yale Bowl; New Haven, CT	W 19–0		
October 23	Washington & Jefferson	Yale Bowl; New Haven, CT	L 7–16		
October 30	Colgate	Yale Bowl; New Haven, CT	L 0–15		
November 6	Brown	Yale Bowl; New Haven, CT	L 0–3		
November 13	Princeton	Yale Bowl; New Haven, CT (rivalry)	W 13–7	65,000	
November 20	at Harvard	Yale Bowl; New Haven, CT (rivalry)	L 0–41	49,000	

== Roster ==
- Parker B. Allen, E
- Allan W. Ames, QB
- Howard M. Baldridge, T
- Bentley, QB
- Carleton W. Betts, E
- Robert S. Bingham, FB
- Clinton Black, G
- Blodgett, E
- George W. Carrington
- Wayne Chatfield-Taylor
- Heylinger Church, E
- Clark, QB
- John I. Conroy
- Durfee, G
- Artemus Gates, T
- Otis Guernsey, FB
- James H. Higginbotham, HB
- Edward W. Hubbard
- Emile W. Jacques
- Kent, G
- Harry LeGore, FB
- Edward T. Miller, C
- George Clark Moseley, E
- Joseph M. Neville, HB
- Charles H. Roberts, G
- William D. Savage, QB
- Richard M. Scovil, HB
- Charles M. Sheldon, T
- James R. Sheldon, G
- Smith, HB
- Stuart, FB
- Charles Phelps Taft II, HB
- Thompson, QB
- Howell Van Nostrand, QB
- Herman V. von Holt, G
- Franklyn E. Waite, FB
- James P. Walden, G
- Nelson M. Way, C
- Carl B. White, C
- Carl F. Wiedemann, E
- Alexander D. Wilson, HB
