= 1915 Rutgers Queensmen football team =

American college football season

1915 Rutgers Queensmen football
- Conference: Independent
- Record: 7–1
- Head coach: George Sanford (3rd season)
- Home stadium: Neilson Field

1915 Eastern college football independents records
	Conf.			Overall
Team	W	L	T	W		L		T
Cornell		–		9	–	0	–	0
Pittsburgh		–		8	–	0	–	0
Columbia		–		5	–	0	–	0
Harvard		–		8	–	1	–	0
Carnegie Tech		–		7	–	1	–	0
Rutgers		–		7	–	1	–	0
Villanova		–		6	–	1	–	0
Washington & Jefferson		–		8	–	1	–	1
Colgate		–		5	–	1	–	0
Syracuse		–		9	–	1	–	2
Dartmouth		–		7	–	1	–	1
Tufts		–		5	–	1	–	2
Penn State		–		7	–	2	–	0
Lafayette		–		8	–	3	–	0
Princeton		–		6	–	2	–	0
Franklin & Marshall		–		6	–	2	–	0
Temple		–		3	–	1	–	1
Geneva		–		6	–	3	–	0
Wesleyan		–		6	–	3	–	0
Allegheny		–		5	–	3	–	0
Swarthmore		–		5	–	3	–	0
Army		–		5	–	3	–	1
Lehigh		–		6	–	4	–	0
Holy Cross		–		3	–	2	–	2
Brown		–		5	–	4	–	1
Fordham		–		4	–	4	–	0
NYU		–		4	–	4	–	1
Middlebury		–		3	–	4	–	2
Muhlenberg		–		4	–	5	–	0
Yale		–		4	–	5	–	0
Boston College		–		3	–	4	–	0
Penn		–		3	–	5	–	2
WPI		–		3	–	5	–	1
Buffalo		–		3	–	5	–	0
Carlisle		–		3	–	6	–	2
Rhode Island State		–		3	–	5	–	0
New Hampshire		–		3	–	6	–	1
Gettysburg		–		3	–	6	–	0
Rochester		–		3	–	6	–	0
Bucknell		–		2	–	6	–	3
Vermont		–		1	–	4	–	2
Williams		–		1	–	7	–	0

The 1915 Rutgers Queensmen football team represented Rutgers University as an independent during the 1915 college football season. In their third season under head coach George Sanford, the Queensmen compiled a 7–1 record and outscored their opponents, 351 to 33. The team shut out four of its eight opponents, and its only loss was to Princeton by a 10 to 0 score. Sanford was inducted into the College Football Hall of Fame in 1971.

== Schedule ==
Date	Opponent	Site	Result	Source
September 25	Albright	Neilson Field; New Brunswick, NJ	W 53–0	
October 2	at Princeton	Palmer Stadium; Princeton, NJ (rivalry)	L 0–10	
October 9	RPI	Neilson Field; New Brunswick, NJ	W 96–0	
October 16	Muhlenberg	Neilson Field; New Brunswick, NJ	W 21–0	
October 30	vs. Springfield YMCA	Newark, NJ	W 44–13	
November 13	at Hamilton Fish Jr.'s All Stars	Polo Grounds; New York, NY	W 28–7	
November 20	at Stevens	Hoboken, NJ	W 39–3	
November 25	at NYU	Ohio Field; Bronx, NY	W 70–0	
