= 1915 Vermont Green and Gold football team =

American college football season

1915 Vermont Green and Gold football
- Conference: Independent
- Record: 1–4–2
- Head coach: Stanley L. Robinson (1st season)
- Home stadium: Centennial Field

1915 Eastern college football independents records
	Conf.			Overall
Team	W	L	T	W		L		T
Cornell		–		9	–	0	–	0
Pittsburgh		–		8	–	0	–	0
Columbia		–		5	–	0	–	0
Harvard		–		8	–	1	–	0
Carnegie Tech		–		7	–	1	–	0
Rutgers		–		7	–	1	–	0
Villanova		–		6	–	1	–	0
Washington & Jefferson		–		8	–	1	–	1
Colgate		–		5	–	1	–	0
Syracuse		–		9	–	1	–	2
Dartmouth		–		7	–	1	–	1
Tufts		–		5	–	1	–	2
Penn State		–		7	–	2	–	0
Lafayette		–		8	–	3	–	0
Princeton		–		6	–	2	–	0
Franklin & Marshall		–		6	–	2	–	0
Temple		–		3	–	1	–	1
Geneva		–		6	–	3	–	0
Wesleyan		–		6	–	3	–	0
Allegheny		–		5	–	3	–	0
Swarthmore		–		5	–	3	–	0
Army		–		5	–	3	–	1
Lehigh		–		6	–	4	–	0
Holy Cross		–		3	–	2	–	2
Brown		–		5	–	4	–	1
Fordham		–		4	–	4	–	0
NYU		–		4	–	4	–	1
Middlebury		–		3	–	4	–	2
Muhlenberg		–		4	–	5	–	0
Yale		–		4	–	5	–	0
Boston College		–		3	–	4	–	0
Penn		–		3	–	5	–	2
WPI		–		3	–	5	–	1
Buffalo		–		3	–	5	–	0
Carlisle		–		3	–	6	–	2
Rhode Island State		–		3	–	5	–	0
New Hampshire		–		3	–	6	–	1
Gettysburg		–		3	–	6	–	0
Rochester		–		3	–	6	–	0
Bucknell		–		2	–	6	–	3
Vermont		–		1	–	4	–	2
Williams		–		1	–	7	–	0

The 1915 Vermont Green and Gold football team was an American football team that represented the University of Vermont as an independent during the 1915 college football season. In their first year under head coach Stanley L. Robinson, the team compiled a 1–4–2 record.

== Schedule ==
Date	Opponent	Site	Result	Source
October 2	WPI	Centennial Field; Burlington, VT	T 0–0	
October 9	at Maine	Alumni Field; Orono, ME	L 0–14	
October 16	at Dartmouth	Alumni Oval; Hanover, NH	L 0–60	
October 23	at Springfield YCMA	Pratt Field; Springfield, MA	L 0–54	
October 30	at Brown	Andrews Field; Providence, RI	L 0–46	
November 6	New Hampshire	Centennial Field; Burlington, VT	W 21–7	
November 20	at Middlebury	Porter Field; Middlebury, VT	T 6–6	
