= 1915 Washington & Jefferson Red and Black football team =

American college football season

1915 Washington & Jefferson Red and Black football
- Conference: Independent
- Record: 8–1–1
- Head coach: Bob Folwell (4th season)

1915 Eastern college football independents records
	Conf.			Overall
Team	W	L	T	W		L		T
Cornell		–		9	–	0	–	0
Pittsburgh		–		8	–	0	–	0
Columbia		–		5	–	0	–	0
Harvard		–		8	–	1	–	0
Carnegie Tech		–		7	–	1	–	0
Rutgers		–		7	–	1	–	0
Villanova		–		6	–	1	–	0
Washington & Jefferson		–		8	–	1	–	1
Colgate		–		5	–	1	–	0
Syracuse		–		9	–	1	–	2
Dartmouth		–		7	–	1	–	1
Tufts		–		5	–	1	–	2
Penn State		–		7	–	2	–	0
Lafayette		–		8	–	3	–	0
Princeton		–		6	–	2	–	0
Franklin & Marshall		–		6	–	2	–	0
Temple		–		3	–	1	–	1
Geneva		–		6	–	3	–	0
Wesleyan		–		6	–	3	–	0
Allegheny		–		5	–	3	–	0
Swarthmore		–		5	–	3	–	0
Army		–		5	–	3	–	1
Lehigh		–		6	–	4	–	0
Holy Cross		–		3	–	2	–	2
Brown		–		5	–	4	–	1
Fordham		–		4	–	4	–	0
NYU		–		4	–	4	–	1
Middlebury		–		3	–	4	–	2
Muhlenberg		–		4	–	5	–	0
Yale		–		4	–	5	–	0
Boston College		–		3	–	4	–	0
Penn		–		3	–	5	–	2
WPI		–		3	–	5	–	1
Buffalo		–		3	–	5	–	0
Carlisle		–		3	–	6	–	2
Rhode Island State		–		3	–	5	–	0
New Hampshire		–		3	–	6	–	1
Gettysburg		–		3	–	6	–	0
Rochester		–		3	–	6	–	0
Bucknell		–		2	–	6	–	3
Vermont		–		1	–	4	–	2
Williams		–		1	–	7	–	0

The 1915 Washington & Jefferson Red and Black football team represented Washington & Jefferson College as an independent during the 1915 college football season. Led by Bob Folwell in his fourth and final year as head coach, Washington & Jefferson compiled a record of 8–1–1.

== Schedule ==
Date	Time	Opponent	Site	Result	Attendance	Source
September 25		Geneva	Washington, PA	W 6–0		
October 2		at West Virginia	Morgantown, WV	T 6–6		
October 9		Lafayette	Washington, PA	W 17–0	6,000	
October 16		Westminster (PA)	Washington, PA	W 34–0		
October 23		at Yale	Yale Bowl; New Haven, CT	W 16–7		
October 30		Muskingum	Washington, PA	W 41–7		
November 6	2:30 p.m.	at Pittsburgh	Forbes Field; Pittsburgh, PA	L 0–19	33,000–40,000	
November 13		vs. West Virginia Wesleyan	Clarksburg, WV	W 7–3		
November 20		Bethany (WV)	Washington, PA	W 59–0		
November 25		Lehigh	Washington, PA	W 27–3		
