= 1915 Rhode Island State football team =

American college football season

1915 Rhode Island State football
- Conference: Independent
- Record: 3–5
- Head coach: James A. Baldwin (1st season)

1915 Eastern college football independents records
	Conf.			Overall
Team	W	L	T	W		L		T
Cornell		–		9	–	0	–	0
Pittsburgh		–		8	–	0	–	0
Columbia		–		5	–	0	–	0
Harvard		–		8	–	1	–	0
Carnegie Tech		–		7	–	1	–	0
Rutgers		–		7	–	1	–	0
Villanova		–		6	–	1	–	0
Washington & Jefferson		–		8	–	1	–	1
Colgate		–		5	–	1	–	0
Syracuse		–		9	–	1	–	2
Dartmouth		–		7	–	1	–	1
Tufts		–		5	–	1	–	2
Penn State		–		7	–	2	–	0
Lafayette		–		8	–	3	–	0
Princeton		–		6	–	2	–	0
Franklin & Marshall		–		6	–	2	–	0
Temple		–		3	–	1	–	1
Geneva		–		6	–	3	–	0
Wesleyan		–		6	–	3	–	0
Allegheny		–		5	–	3	–	0
Swarthmore		–		5	–	3	–	0
Army		–		5	–	3	–	1
Lehigh		–		6	–	4	–	0
Holy Cross		–		3	–	2	–	2
Brown		–		5	–	4	–	1
Fordham		–		4	–	4	–	0
NYU		–		4	–	4	–	1
Middlebury		–		3	–	4	–	2
Muhlenberg		–		4	–	5	–	0
Yale		–		4	–	5	–	0
Boston College		–		3	–	4	–	0
Penn		–		3	–	5	–	2
WPI		–		3	–	5	–	1
Buffalo		–		3	–	5	–	0
Carlisle		–		3	–	6	–	2
Rhode Island State		–		3	–	5	–	0
New Hampshire		–		3	–	6	–	1
Gettysburg		–		3	–	6	–	0
Rochester		–		3	–	6	–	0
Bucknell		–		2	–	6	–	3
Vermont		–		1	–	4	–	2
Williams		–		1	–	7	–	0

The 1915 Rhode Island State football team was an American football team that represented Rhode Island State College (later renamed the University of Rhode Island) as an independent during the 1915 college football season. In its first year under head coach James A. Baldwin, the team compiled a 3–5 record.

== Schedule ==
Date	Opponent	Site	Result	Source
September 25	at Brown	Andrews Field; Providence, RI (rivalry)	L 0–38	
October 2	at Wesleyan	Middletown, CT	L 0–12	
October 16	at Worcester Tech	Worcester, MA	L 0–6	
October 23	at Connecticut	Athletic Field; Storrs, CT (rivalry)	W 9–7	
October 30	at Union (NY)	Alexander Field; Schenectady, NY	L 0–3	
November 6	St. Stephens	Kingston, RI	W 47–0	
November 13	at Fordham	Fordham Field; Bronx, NY	L 0–7	
November 20	New Hampshire	Kingston, RI	W 19–0	
