= 1915 Geneva Covenanters football team =

American college football season

1915 Geneva Covenanters football
- Conference: Independent
- Record: 6–3
- Head coach: C. Brainerd Metheny (3rd season)

1915 Eastern college football independents records
	Conf.			Overall
Team	W	L	T	W		L		T
Cornell		–		9	–	0	–	0
Pittsburgh		–		8	–	0	–	0
Columbia		–		5	–	0	–	0
Harvard		–		8	–	1	–	0
Carnegie Tech		–		7	–	1	–	0
Rutgers		–		7	–	1	–	0
Villanova		–		6	–	1	–	0
Washington & Jefferson		–		8	–	1	–	1
Colgate		–		5	–	1	–	0
Syracuse		–		9	–	1	–	2
Dartmouth		–		7	–	1	–	1
Tufts		–		5	–	1	–	2
Penn State		–		7	–	2	–	0
Lafayette		–		8	–	3	–	0
Princeton		–		6	–	2	–	0
Franklin & Marshall		–		6	–	2	–	0
Temple		–		3	–	1	–	1
Geneva		–		6	–	3	–	0
Wesleyan		–		6	–	3	–	0
Allegheny		–		5	–	3	–	0
Swarthmore		–		5	–	3	–	0
Army		–		5	–	3	–	1
Lehigh		–		6	–	4	–	0
Holy Cross		–		3	–	2	–	2
Brown		–		5	–	4	–	1
Fordham		–		4	–	4	–	0
NYU		–		4	–	4	–	1
Middlebury		–		3	–	4	–	2
Muhlenberg		–		4	–	5	–	0
Yale		–		4	–	5	–	0
Boston College		–		3	–	4	–	0
Penn		–		3	–	5	–	2
WPI		–		3	–	5	–	1
Buffalo		–		3	–	5	–	0
Carlisle		–		3	–	6	–	2
Rhode Island State		–		3	–	5	–	0
New Hampshire		–		3	–	6	–	1
Gettysburg		–		3	–	6	–	0
Rochester		–		3	–	6	–	0
Bucknell		–		2	–	6	–	3
Vermont		–		1	–	4	–	2
Williams		–		1	–	7	–	0

The 1915 Geneva Covenanters football team was an American football team that represented Geneva College as an independent during the 1915 college football season. Led by third-year head coach C. Brainerd Metheny, the team compiled a record of 6–3.

== Schedule ==
Date	Time	Opponent	Site	Result	Attendance	Source
September 25		at Washington & Jefferson	Washington, PA	L 0–6		
October 2		Thiel	Beaver Falls, PA	W 6–0		
October 9		Hiram	Beaver Falls, PA	W 14–0		
October 16		at West Virginia	Morgantown, WV	L 0–32		
October 23		Muskingum	Beaver Falls, PA	W 36–0		
October 30		Westminster (PA)	Beaver Falls, PA	W 14–7	2,000–2,500	
November 6	2:15 p.m.	at Buffalo	International Park; Buffalo, NY	W 29–0		
November 13		Ellwood City Collegians	Beaver Falls, PA	W 51–0		
November 20		at Allegheny	Meadville, PA	L 0–19		
All times are in Eastern time
