= 1915 NYU Violets football team =

American college football season

1915 NYU Violets football
- Conference: Independent
- Record: 4–4–1
- Head coach: Thomas T. Reilley (2nd season)
- Home stadium: Ohio Field

1915 Eastern college football independents records
	Conf.			Overall
Team	W	L	T	W		L		T
Cornell		–		9	–	0	–	0
Pittsburgh		–		8	–	0	–	0
Columbia		–		5	–	0	–	0
Harvard		–		8	–	1	–	0
Carnegie Tech		–		7	–	1	–	0
Rutgers		–		7	–	1	–	0
Villanova		–		6	–	1	–	0
Washington & Jefferson		–		8	–	1	–	1
Colgate		–		5	–	1	–	0
Syracuse		–		9	–	1	–	2
Dartmouth		–		7	–	1	–	1
Tufts		–		5	–	1	–	2
Penn State		–		7	–	2	–	0
Lafayette		–		8	–	3	–	0
Princeton		–		6	–	2	–	0
Franklin & Marshall		–		6	–	2	–	0
Temple		–		3	–	1	–	1
Geneva		–		6	–	3	–	0
Wesleyan		–		6	–	3	–	0
Allegheny		–		5	–	3	–	0
Swarthmore		–		5	–	3	–	0
Army		–		5	–	3	–	1
Lehigh		–		6	–	4	–	0
Holy Cross		–		3	–	2	–	2
Brown		–		5	–	4	–	1
Fordham		–		4	–	4	–	0
NYU		–		4	–	4	–	1
Middlebury		–		3	–	4	–	2
Muhlenberg		–		4	–	5	–	0
Yale		–		4	–	5	–	0
Boston College		–		3	–	4	–	0
Penn		–		3	–	5	–	2
WPI		–		3	–	5	–	1
Buffalo		–		3	–	5	–	0
Carlisle		–		3	–	6	–	2
Rhode Island State		–		3	–	5	–	0
New Hampshire		–		3	–	6	–	1
Gettysburg		–		3	–	6	–	0
Rochester		–		3	–	6	–	0
Bucknell		–		2	–	6	–	3
Vermont		–		1	–	4	–	2
Williams		–		1	–	7	–	0

The 1915 NYU Violets football team was an American football team that represented New York University as an independent during the 1915 college football season. In their second year under head coach Thomas T. Reilley, the team compiled a 4–4–1 record.

== Schedule ==
Date	Opponent	Site	Result	Source
October 2	at RPI	Troy, NY	W 23–0	
October 9	Hamilton	Ohio Field; Bronx, NY	W 31–13	
October 16	Union (NY)	Ohio Field; Bronx, NY	W 10–0	
October 23	at Haverford	Walton Field; Haverford, PA	L 6–21	
November 2	Bucknell	Ohio Field; Bronx, NY	T 3–3	
November 6	Stevens	Ohio Field; Bronx, NY	W 7–0	
November 13	Wesleyan	Ohio Field; Bronx, NY	L 0–34	
November 20	at Columbia	South Field; New York, NY	L 16–19	
November 25	Rutgers	Ohio Field; Bronx, NY	L 0–70	
