= 1915 Lafayette football team =

American football club

1915 Lafayette football
- Conference: Independent
- Record: 8–3
- Head coach: Wilmer G. Crowell (2nd season)
- Captain: John Luhr
- Home stadium: March Field

1915 Eastern college football independents records
	Conf.			Overall
Team	W	L	T	W		L		T
Cornell		–		9	–	0	–	0
Pittsburgh		–		8	–	0	–	0
Columbia		–		5	–	0	–	0
Harvard		–		8	–	1	–	0
Carnegie Tech		–		7	–	1	–	0
Rutgers		–		7	–	1	–	0
Villanova		–		6	–	1	–	0
Washington & Jefferson		–		8	–	1	–	1
Colgate		–		5	–	1	–	0
Syracuse		–		9	–	1	–	2
Dartmouth		–		7	–	1	–	1
Tufts		–		5	–	1	–	2
Penn State		–		7	–	2	–	0
Lafayette		–		8	–	3	–	0
Princeton		–		6	–	2	–	0
Franklin & Marshall		–		6	–	2	–	0
Temple		–		3	–	1	–	1
Geneva		–		6	–	3	–	0
Wesleyan		–		6	–	3	–	0
Allegheny		–		5	–	3	–	0
Swarthmore		–		5	–	3	–	0
Army		–		5	–	3	–	1
Lehigh		–		6	–	4	–	0
Holy Cross		–		3	–	2	–	2
Brown		–		5	–	4	–	1
Fordham		–		4	–	4	–	0
NYU		–		4	–	4	–	1
Middlebury		–		3	–	4	–	2
Muhlenberg		–		4	–	5	–	0
Yale		–		4	–	5	–	0
Boston College		–		3	–	4	–	0
Penn		–		3	–	5	–	2
WPI		–		3	–	5	–	1
Buffalo		–		3	–	5	–	0
Carlisle		–		3	–	6	–	2
Rhode Island State		–		3	–	5	–	0
New Hampshire		–		3	–	6	–	1
Gettysburg		–		3	–	6	–	0
Rochester		–		3	–	6	–	0
Bucknell		–		2	–	6	–	3
Vermont		–		1	–	4	–	2
Williams		–		1	–	7	–	0

The 1915 Lafayette football team was an American football team that represented Lafayette College as an independent during the 1915 college football season. In its second season under head coach Wilmer G. Crowell, the team compiled an 8–3 record. John Luhr was the team captain. The team played its home games at March Field in Easton, Pennsylvania.

== Schedule ==
Date	Opponent	Site	Result	Attendance	Source
September 25	Muhlenberg	March Field; Easton, PA	W 14–7		
October 2	Ursinus	March Field; Easton, PA	W 13–2		
October 9	at Washington & Jefferson	Washington, PA	L 0–17	6,000	
October 16	at Princeton	Palmer Stadium; Princeton, NJ	L 3–40		
October 23	Albright	March Field; Easton, PA	W 46–0		
October 30	at Penn	Franklin Field; Philadelphia, PA	W 17–0		
November 6	Swarthmore	March Field; Easton, PA	W 17–0		
November 13	Penn State	March Field; Easton, PA	L 3–33		
November 20	at Lehigh	Taylor Stadium; Bethlehem, PA (rivalry)	W 35–6		
