= 1915 Boston College football team =

American college football season

1915 Boston College football
- Conference: Independent
- Record: 3–4
- Head coach: Stephen Mahoney (2nd season)
- Captain: D. Leo Daley
- Home stadium: Alumni Field, Fenway Park

1915 Eastern college football independents records
	Conf.			Overall
Team	W	L	T	W		L		T
Cornell		–		9	–	0	–	0
Pittsburgh		–		8	–	0	–	0
Columbia		–		5	–	0	–	0
Harvard		–		8	–	1	–	0
Carnegie Tech		–		7	–	1	–	0
Rutgers		–		7	–	1	–	0
Villanova		–		6	–	1	–	0
Washington & Jefferson		–		8	–	1	–	1
Colgate		–		5	–	1	–	0
Syracuse		–		9	–	1	–	2
Dartmouth		–		7	–	1	–	1
Tufts		–		5	–	1	–	2
Penn State		–		7	–	2	–	0
Lafayette		–		8	–	3	–	0
Princeton		–		6	–	2	–	0
Franklin & Marshall		–		6	–	2	–	0
Temple		–		3	–	1	–	1
Geneva		–		6	–	3	–	0
Wesleyan		–		6	–	3	–	0
Allegheny		–		5	–	3	–	0
Swarthmore		–		5	–	3	–	0
Army		–		5	–	3	–	1
Lehigh		–		6	–	4	–	0
Holy Cross		–		3	–	2	–	2
Brown		–		5	–	4	–	1
Fordham		–		4	–	4	–	0
NYU		–		4	–	4	–	1
Middlebury		–		3	–	4	–	2
Muhlenberg		–		4	–	5	–	0
Yale		–		4	–	5	–	0
Boston College		–		3	–	4	–	0
Penn		–		3	–	5	–	2
WPI		–		3	–	5	–	1
Buffalo		–		3	–	5	–	0
Carlisle		–		3	–	6	–	2
Rhode Island State		–		3	–	5	–	0
New Hampshire		–		3	–	6	–	1
Gettysburg		–		3	–	6	–	0
Rochester		–		3	–	6	–	0
Bucknell		–		2	–	6	–	3
Vermont		–		1	–	4	–	2
Williams		–		1	–	7	–	0

The 1915 Boston College football team was an American football team that represented Boston College as an independent during the 1915 college football season. Led by Stephen Mahoney in his second and final season as head coach, Boston College compiled a record of 3–4.

== Schedule ==
Date	Time	Opponent	Site	Result	Source
October 9		at Bowdoin	Whittier Field; Brunswick, ME	L 0–14	
October 16	3:00 p.m.	at Maine	Orono, ME	L 0–14	
October 23		at Tufts	Tufts Oval; Somerville, MA	L 0–26	
October 30		Holy Cross	Alumni Field; Chestnut Hill, MA (rivalry)	L 0–9	
November 6		Fordham	Alumni Field; Chestnut Hill, MA	W 3–0	
November 13		at Connecticut	Athletic Fields; Storrs, CT	W 7–6	
November 25	2:30 p.m.	Norwich	Fenway Park; Boston, MA	W 35–0	
