= 1915 Fordham Maroon football team =

American college football season

1915 Fordham Maroon football
- Conference: Independent
- Record: 19–6 / 4–4
- Head coach: Harry Vaughan (1st season)
- Captain: David Dunn
- Home stadium: Fordham Field

1915 Eastern college football independents records
	Conf.			Overall
Team	W	L	T	W		L		T
Cornell		–		9	–	0	–	0
Pittsburgh		–		8	–	0	–	0
Columbia		–		5	–	0	–	0
Harvard		–		8	–	1	–	0
Carnegie Tech		–		7	–	1	–	0
Rutgers		–		7	–	1	–	0
Villanova		–		6	–	1	–	0
Washington & Jefferson		–		8	–	1	–	1
Colgate		–		5	–	1	–	0
Syracuse		–		9	–	1	–	2
Dartmouth		–		7	–	1	–	1
Tufts		–		5	–	1	–	2
Penn State		–		7	–	2	–	0
Lafayette		–		8	–	3	–	0
Princeton		–		6	–	2	–	0
Franklin & Marshall		–		6	–	2	–	0
Temple		–		3	–	1	–	1
Geneva		–		6	–	3	–	0
Wesleyan		–		6	–	3	–	0
Allegheny		–		5	–	3	–	0
Swarthmore		–		5	–	3	–	0
Army		–		5	–	3	–	1
Lehigh		–		6	–	4	–	0
Holy Cross		–		3	–	2	–	2
Brown		–		5	–	4	–	1
Fordham		–		4	–	4	–	0
NYU		–		4	–	4	–	1
Middlebury		–		3	–	4	–	2
Muhlenberg		–		4	–	5	–	0
Yale		–		4	–	5	–	0
Boston College		–		3	–	4	–	0
Penn		–		3	–	5	–	2
WPI		–		3	–	5	–	1
Buffalo		–		3	–	5	–	0
Carlisle		–		3	–	6	–	2
Rhode Island State		–		3	–	5	–	0
New Hampshire		–		3	–	6	–	1
Gettysburg		–		3	–	6	–	0
Rochester		–		3	–	6	–	0
Bucknell		–		2	–	6	–	3
Vermont		–		1	–	4	–	2
Williams		–		1	–	7	–	0

The 1915 Fordham Maroon football team was an American football team that represented Fordham University as an independent during the 1915 college football season. Fordham claims a 19–6 record. College Football Data Warehouse (CFDW) lists the team's record at 4–4.

Harry Vaughan was the coach, and David Dunn was the captain. The team played its home games at Fordham Field in The Bronx.

== Schedule ==
The following eight games are reported in Fordham's media guide, CFDW and contemporaneous press coverage.

Date	Opponent	Site	Result	Attendance	Source
October 9	at Union (NY)	Schenectady, NY	L 0–6		
October 16	Connecticut	Fordham Field; Bronx, NY	W 35–0		
October 23	Holy Cross	Fordham Field; Bronx, NY	W 10–0		
November 2	Georgetown	Fordham Field; Bronx, NY	L 7–33	4,000	
November 6	at Boston College	Alumni Field; Chestnut Hill, MA	L 0–3		
November 13	Rhode Island State	Fordham Field; Bronx, NY	W 7–0		
November 20	Carlisle	Fordham Field; Bronx, NY	W 14–10		
November 25	Villanova	Fordham Field; Bronx, NY	L 0–33	4,000	

The following are additional games reported in the Fordham media guide.

Date	Opponent	Site	Result	Source
October 27	NYU	Fordham Field; Bronx, NY	T 0–0	
	Fort Totten		L 0–6	
	Fort Hancock		W 10–6	
	USS Wyoming		W 30–6	
	USS Texas		W 28–7	
	USS Arkansas		W 24–0	
	Carlisle		W 18–6	
	Cooper Pharmacy		W 30–0	
	NYU		W 20–0	
	USS Texas		W 31–7	
	USS Arkansas		W 20–0	
	Carlisle		L	
	Fordham Prep		W 21–0	
	St. Peter's		W 1–0	
	Lehigh freshmen		W 42–0	
	Cooper Pharmacy		W 30–0	
	NYU		W 18–6	
	Army Plebes		W	
