= 1915 New Hampshire football team =

American college football season

1915 New Hampshire football
- Conference: Independent
- Record: 3–6–1 (Note: Contemporary sources from 1915 reported the tie game as a New Hampshire win, and one loss as being a practice game; this would yield a 4–5 record.)
- Head coach: Butch Cowell (1st season)
- Captain: Kyle C. Westover
- Home stadium: College grounds, Durham, NH

1915 Eastern college football independents records
	Conf.			Overall
Team	W	L	T	W		L		T
Cornell		–		9	–	0	–	0
Pittsburgh		–		8	–	0	–	0
Columbia		–		5	–	0	–	0
Harvard		–		8	–	1	–	0
Carnegie Tech		–		7	–	1	–	0
Rutgers		–		7	–	1	–	0
Villanova		–		6	–	1	–	0
Washington & Jefferson		–		8	–	1	–	1
Colgate		–		5	–	1	–	0
Syracuse		–		9	–	1	–	2
Dartmouth		–		7	–	1	–	1
Tufts		–		5	–	1	–	2
Penn State		–		7	–	2	–	0
Lafayette		–		8	–	3	–	0
Princeton		–		6	–	2	–	0
Franklin & Marshall		–		6	–	2	–	0
Temple		–		3	–	1	–	1
Geneva		–		6	–	3	–	0
Wesleyan		–		6	–	3	–	0
Allegheny		–		5	–	3	–	0
Swarthmore		–		5	–	3	–	0
Army		–		5	–	3	–	1
Lehigh		–		6	–	4	–	0
Holy Cross		–		3	–	2	–	2
Brown		–		5	–	4	–	1
Fordham		–		4	–	4	–	0
NYU		–		4	–	4	–	1
Middlebury		–		3	–	4	–	2
Muhlenberg		–		4	–	5	–	0
Yale		–		4	–	5	–	0
Boston College		–		3	–	4	–	0
Penn		–		3	–	5	–	2
WPI		–		3	–	5	–	1
Buffalo		–		3	–	5	–	0
Carlisle		–		3	–	6	–	2
Rhode Island State		–		3	–	5	–	0
New Hampshire		–		3	–	6	–	1
Gettysburg		–		3	–	6	–	0
Rochester		–		3	–	6	–	0
Bucknell		–		2	–	6	–	3
Vermont		–		1	–	4	–	2
Williams		–		1	–	7	–	0

The 1915 New Hampshire football team (Note: The school did not adopt the Wildcats nickname until February 1926; before then, they were generally referred to as "the blue and white".) was an American football team that represented New Hampshire College of Agriculture and the Mechanic Arts (Note: The school was often referred to as New Hampshire College or New Hampshire State College in newspapers of the era.) during the 1915 college football season—the school became the University of New Hampshire in 1923. Under first-year head coach Butch Cowell, the team finished with a record of 3–6–1.

== Schedule ==
During this era, teams played in the one-platoon system. Scoring values were consistent with the present day: six points for a touchdown, one point for a conversion kick (extra point), and three points for a field goal. (Note: For additional detail, see Early history of American football#Scoring table.)

Date	Opponent	Site	Result	Attendance	Source
September 25	at Bowdoin	Brunswick, ME	L 0–19		
October 2	at Colby	Seaverns Field; Waterville, ME	L 0–18		
October 9	Connecticut	Durham, NH	W 18–0		
October 16	Bates	Durham, NH	W 6–0		
October 23	at Middlebury	Middlebury, VT	L 0–14		
October 26	Fort McKinley (Note: The New Hampshire referred to the contest against Fort McKinley as a practice game, and the result is absent from the season summary in The Granite yearbook.)	Durham, NH	L 0–6		
October 30	Norwich	Durham, NH	T 13–13 (Note: Contemporary newspapers and The Granite yearbook reported a 14–13 victory for New Hampshire.)		
November 6	at Vermont	Centennial Field; Burlington, VT	L 7–21		
November 13	at Worcester Tech	Alumni Field; Worcester, MA	W 20–0	2,500	
November 20	at Rhode Island State	Kingston, RI	L 0–19		
