= 1915 Connecticut Aggies football team =

American college football season

1915 Connecticut Aggies football
- Conference: Athletic League of New England State Colleges
- Record: 1–7 (0–2 New England)
- Head coach: John F. Donahue (1st season)
- Home stadium: Athletic Fields

The 1915 Connecticut Aggies football team represented Connecticut Agricultural College, now the University of Connecticut, in the 1915 college football season. The Aggies were led by first-year head coach John F. Donahue, and completed the season with a record of 1–7.

== Schedule ==
Date	Opponent	Site	Result	Source
September 25	at Worcester Tech*	Worcester, MA	L 0–7	
October 2	at Stevens*	Hoboken, NJ	L 3–14	
October 9	at New Hampshire	Durham, NH	L 0–18	
October 16	at Fordham*	Fordham Field; Bronx, NY	L 0–35	
October 23	Rhode Island State	Athletic Fields; Storrs, CT (rivalry)	L 7–9	
October 30	Springfield YMCA*	Athletic Fields; Storrs, CT	W 18–0	
November 6	at Columbia*	South Field; New York, NY	L 6–17	
November 13	Boston College*	Athletic Fields; Storrs, CT	L 6–7	
*Non-conference game
