= 1915 Holy Cross football team =

American college football season

1915 Holy Cross football
- Conference: Independent
- Record: 3–3–2
- Head coach: Luke Kelly (2nd season)
- Captain: Ed Brawley
- Home stadium: Fitton Field

1915 Eastern college football independents records
	Conf.			Overall
Team	W	L	T	W		L		T
Cornell		–		9	–	0	–	0
Pittsburgh		–		8	–	0	–	0
Columbia		–		5	–	0	–	0
Harvard		–		8	–	1	–	0
Carnegie Tech		–		7	–	1	–	0
Rutgers		–		7	–	1	–	0
Villanova		–		6	–	1	–	0
Washington & Jefferson		–		8	–	1	–	1
Colgate		–		5	–	1	–	0
Syracuse		–		9	–	1	–	2
Dartmouth		–		7	–	1	–	1
Tufts		–		5	–	1	–	2
Penn State		–		7	–	2	–	0
Lafayette		–		8	–	3	–	0
Princeton		–		6	–	2	–	0
Franklin & Marshall		–		6	–	2	–	0
Temple		–		3	–	1	–	1
Geneva		–		6	–	3	–	0
Wesleyan		–		6	–	3	–	0
Allegheny		–		5	–	3	–	0
Swarthmore		–		5	–	3	–	0
Army		–		5	–	3	–	1
Lehigh		–		6	–	4	–	0
Holy Cross		–		3	–	2	–	2
Brown		–		5	–	4	–	1
Fordham		–		4	–	4	–	0
NYU		–		4	–	4	–	1
Middlebury		–		3	–	4	–	2
Muhlenberg		–		4	–	5	–	0
Yale		–		4	–	5	–	0
Boston College		–		3	–	4	–	0
Penn		–		3	–	5	–	2
WPI		–		3	–	5	–	1
Buffalo		–		3	–	5	–	0
Carlisle		–		3	–	6	–	2
Rhode Island State		–		3	–	5	–	0
New Hampshire		–		3	–	6	–	1
Gettysburg		–		3	–	6	–	0
Rochester		–		3	–	6	–	0
Bucknell		–		2	–	6	–	3
Vermont		–		1	–	4	–	2
Williams		–		1	–	7	–	0

The 1915 Holy Cross football team was an American football team that represented the College of the Holy Cross in the 1915 college football season.

In its second year under head coach Luke Kelly, the team compiled a 3–3–2 record. Edward Brawley was the team captain.

Holy Cross played its home games at Fitton Field on the college campus in Worcester, Massachusetts.

== Schedule ==
Date	Opponent	Site	Result	Source
September 25	Bates	Fitton Field; Worcester, MA	W 7–0	
October 2	at Army	The Plain; West Point, NY	T 14–14	
October 9	Springfield YMCA	Fitton Field; Worcester, MA	L 0–7	
October 16	Massachusetts	Fitton Field; Worcester, MA	T 7–7	
October 23	at Fordham	Fordham Field; Bronx, NY (rivalry)	L 0–9	
October 30	at Boston College	Alumni Field; Chestnut Hill, MA (rivalry)	W 9–0	
November 6	Carlisle	Fitton Field; Worcester, MA	L 21–23	
November 25	Worcester Polytechnic	Fitton Field; Worcester, MA	W 26–0	
