= 1915 Colgate football team =

American college football season

1915 Colgate football
- Conference: Independent
- Record: 5–1
- Head coach: Laurence Bankart (4th season)
- Captain: Earl Abell
- Home stadium: Whitnall Field

1915 Eastern college football independents records
	Conf.			Overall
Team	W	L	T	W		L		T
Cornell		–		9	–	0	–	0
Pittsburgh		–		8	–	0	–	0
Columbia		–		5	–	0	–	0
Harvard		–		8	–	1	–	0
Carnegie Tech		–		7	–	1	–	0
Rutgers		–		7	–	1	–	0
Villanova		–		6	–	1	–	0
Washington & Jefferson		–		8	–	1	–	1
Colgate		–		5	–	1	–	0
Syracuse		–		9	–	1	–	2
Dartmouth		–		7	–	1	–	1
Tufts		–		5	–	1	–	2
Penn State		–		7	–	2	–	0
Lafayette		–		8	–	3	–	0
Princeton		–		6	–	2	–	0
Franklin & Marshall		–		6	–	2	–	0
Temple		–		3	–	1	–	1
Geneva		–		6	–	3	–	0
Wesleyan		–		6	–	3	–	0
Allegheny		–		5	–	3	–	0
Swarthmore		–		5	–	3	–	0
Army		–		5	–	3	–	1
Lehigh		–		6	–	4	–	0
Holy Cross		–		3	–	2	–	2
Brown		–		5	–	4	–	1
Fordham		–		4	–	4	–	0
NYU		–		4	–	4	–	1
Middlebury		–		3	–	4	–	2
Muhlenberg		–		4	–	5	–	0
Yale		–		4	–	5	–	0
Boston College		–		3	–	4	–	0
Penn		–		3	–	5	–	2
WPI		–		3	–	5	–	1
Buffalo		–		3	–	5	–	0
Carlisle		–		3	–	6	–	2
Rhode Island State		–		3	–	5	–	0
New Hampshire		–		3	–	6	–	1
Gettysburg		–		3	–	6	–	0
Rochester		–		3	–	6	–	0
Bucknell		–		2	–	6	–	3
Vermont		–		1	–	4	–	2
Williams		–		1	–	7	–	0

The 1915 Colgate football team was an American football team that represented Colgate University as an independent during the 1915 college football season. In its fourth season under head coach Laurence Bankart, the team compiled a 5–1 record and outscored opponents by a total of 223 to 38. Earl Abell was the team captain. The team played its home games on Whitnall Field in Hamilton, New York.

== Schedule ==
Date	Opponent	Site	Result	Attendance	Source
October 2	Susquehanna	Whitnall Field; Hamilton, NY	W 44–0		
October 9	at Rochester	Rochester, NY	W 44–0		
October 16	at Army	The Plain; West Point, NY	W 13–0		
October 23	RPI	Whitnall Field; Hamilton, NY	W 107–0		
October 30	at Yale	Yale Bowl; New Haven, CT	W 15–0		
November 13	at Syracuse	Archbold Stadium; Syracuse, NY (rivalry)	L 0–38	25,000	
