= 1915 Swarthmore Quakers football team =

American college football season

1915 Swarthmore Quakers football
- Conference: Independent
- Record: 5–3
- Head coach: Bill Roper (1st season)
- Home stadium: Whittier Field

1915 Eastern college football independents records
	Conf.			Overall
Team	W	L	T	W		L		T
Cornell		–		9	–	0	–	0
Pittsburgh		–		8	–	0	–	0
Columbia		–		5	–	0	–	0
Harvard		–		8	–	1	–	0
Carnegie Tech		–		7	–	1	–	0
Rutgers		–		7	–	1	–	0
Villanova		–		6	–	1	–	0
Washington & Jefferson		–		8	–	1	–	1
Colgate		–		5	–	1	–	0
Syracuse		–		9	–	1	–	2
Dartmouth		–		7	–	1	–	1
Tufts		–		5	–	1	–	2
Penn State		–		7	–	2	–	0
Lafayette		–		8	–	3	–	0
Princeton		–		6	–	2	–	0
Franklin & Marshall		–		6	–	2	–	0
Temple		–		3	–	1	–	1
Geneva		–		6	–	3	–	0
Wesleyan		–		6	–	3	–	0
Allegheny		–		5	–	3	–	0
Swarthmore		–		5	–	3	–	0
Army		–		5	–	3	–	1
Lehigh		–		6	–	4	–	0
Holy Cross		–		3	–	2	–	2
Brown		–		5	–	4	–	1
Fordham		–		4	–	4	–	0
NYU		–		4	–	4	–	1
Middlebury		–		3	–	4	–	2
Muhlenberg		–		4	–	5	–	0
Yale		–		4	–	5	–	0
Boston College		–		3	–	4	–	0
Penn		–		3	–	5	–	2
WPI		–		3	–	5	–	1
Buffalo		–		3	–	5	–	0
Carlisle		–		3	–	6	–	2
Rhode Island State		–		3	–	5	–	0
New Hampshire		–		3	–	6	–	1
Gettysburg		–		3	–	6	–	0
Rochester		–		3	–	6	–	0
Bucknell		–		2	–	6	–	3
Vermont		–		1	–	4	–	2
Williams		–		1	–	7	–	0

The 1915 Swarthmore Quakers football team was an American football team that represented Swarthmore College as an independent during the 1915 college football season. In their first season under head coach Bill Roper, the Quakers compiled a 5–3 record and outscored opponents by a total of 94 to 77.

== Schedule ==
Date	Opponent	Site	Result	Source
October 2	Dickinson	Whittier Field; Swarthmore, PA	W 42–0	
October 9	at Bucknell	Lewisburg, PA	W 3–0	
October 16	at Ursinus	Collegeville, PA	W 14–6	
October 23	Franklin & Marshall	Whittier Field; Swarthmore, PA	L 7–21	
October 30	at Johns Hopkins	Baltimore, MD	W 21–12	
November 6	at Lafayette	March Field; Easton, PA	L 0–17	
November 13	Villanova	Whittier Field; Swarthmore, PA	L 0–19	
November 20	Haverford	Whittier Field; Swarthmore, PA (rivalry)	W 7–2	
