= 1915 Lehigh Brown and White football team =

American college football season

1915 Lehigh Brown and White football
- Conference: Independent
- Record: 6–4
- Head coach: Tom Keady (4th season)
- Home stadium: Taylor Stadium

1915 Eastern college football independents records
	Conf.			Overall
Team	W	L	T	W		L		T
Cornell		–		9	–	0	–	0
Pittsburgh		–		8	–	0	–	0
Columbia		–		5	–	0	–	0
Harvard		–		8	–	1	–	0
Carnegie Tech		–		7	–	1	–	0
Rutgers		–		7	–	1	–	0
Villanova		–		6	–	1	–	0
Washington & Jefferson		–		8	–	1	–	1
Colgate		–		5	–	1	–	0
Syracuse		–		9	–	1	–	2
Dartmouth		–		7	–	1	–	1
Tufts		–		5	–	1	–	2
Penn State		–		7	–	2	–	0
Lafayette		–		8	–	3	–	0
Princeton		–		6	–	2	–	0
Franklin & Marshall		–		6	–	2	–	0
Temple		–		3	–	1	–	1
Geneva		–		6	–	3	–	0
Wesleyan		–		6	–	3	–	0
Allegheny		–		5	–	3	–	0
Swarthmore		–		5	–	3	–	0
Army		–		5	–	3	–	1
Lehigh		–		6	–	4	–	0
Holy Cross		–		3	–	2	–	2
Brown		–		5	–	4	–	1
Fordham		–		4	–	4	–	0
NYU		–		4	–	4	–	1
Middlebury		–		3	–	4	–	2
Muhlenberg		–		4	–	5	–	0
Yale		–		4	–	5	–	0
Boston College		–		3	–	4	–	0
Penn		–		3	–	5	–	2
WPI		–		3	–	5	–	1
Buffalo		–		3	–	5	–	0
Carlisle		–		3	–	6	–	2
Rhode Island State		–		3	–	5	–	0
New Hampshire		–		3	–	6	–	1
Gettysburg		–		3	–	6	–	0
Rochester		–		3	–	6	–	0
Bucknell		–		2	–	6	–	3
Vermont		–		1	–	4	–	2
Williams		–		1	–	7	–	0

The 1915 Lehigh Brown and White football team was an American football team that represented Lehigh University as an independent during the 1915 college football season. In its fourth season under head coach Tom Keady, the team compiled a 6–4 record and outscored opponents by a total of 155 to 85. Lehigh played home games at Taylor Stadium in South Bethlehem, Pennsylvania.

== Schedule ==
Date	Opponent	Site	Result	Source
September 25	Ursinus	Taylor Stadium; South Bethlehem, PA	W 20–0	
October 2	Carlisle	Taylor Stadium; South Bethlehem, PA	W 14–0	
October 9	at Yale	Yale Field; New Haven, CT	L 6–7	
October 16	Albright	Taylor Stadium; South Bethlehem, PA	W 27–0	
October 23	Muhlenberg	Taylor Stadium; South Bethlehem, PA	W 20–0	
October 30	Gettysburg	Taylor Stadium; South Bethlehem, PA	W 29–0	
November 5	at Penn State	New Beaver Field; State College, PA	L 0–7	
November 13	Lebanon Valley	Taylor Stadium; South Bethlehem, PA	W 30–9	
November 20	Lafayette	Taylor Stadium; South Bethlehem, PA (rivalry)	L 6–35	
November 25	at Washington & Jefferson	Washington, PA	L 3–27	
