= Victor Kelly =

American football player and coach (1887–1958)

Victor Kelley
Biographical details
- Born: October 31, 1887; Noble County, Oklahoma Territory, U.S.
- Died: July 25, 1958 (aged 70); Los Angeles, California, U.S.

Playing career
- 1906–1907: Texas A&M
- Position: Quarterback

Coaching career (HC unless noted)
- 1915: Carlisle
- 1916: Austin (assistant)
- 1921: SMU (assistant)

Head coaching record
- Overall: 3–6–2

Victor Murat "Chock" Kelley (October 31, 1887 – July 25, 1958) was an America college football player and coach. He played quarterback for the Texas A&M Aggies football team and would later become the coach of the Carlisle Indians. Carlisle paid him a salary of $4,000 a year. He was also an assistant coach of the 1921 SMU Mustangs.

== Head coaching record ==
Year	Team	Overall	Conference	Standing	Bowl/playoffs
Carlisle Indians (Independent) (1915)
1915	Carlisle	3–6–2			
Carlisle:		3–6–2			
Total:		3–6–2			
