= 1915 Columbia Lions football team =

American college football season

1915 Columbia Lions football
- Conference: Independent
- Record: 5–0
- Head coach: T. Nelson Metcalf (1st season)
- Captain: F. M. Simonds Jr.
- Home stadium: South Field

1915 Eastern college football independents records
	Conf.			Overall
Team	W	L	T	W		L		T
Cornell		–		9	–	0	–	0
Pittsburgh		–		8	–	0	–	0
Columbia		–		5	–	0	–	0
Harvard		–		8	–	1	–	0
Carnegie Tech		–		7	–	1	–	0
Rutgers		–		7	–	1	–	0
Villanova		–		6	–	1	–	0
Washington & Jefferson		–		8	–	1	–	1
Colgate		–		5	–	1	–	0
Syracuse		–		9	–	1	–	2
Dartmouth		–		7	–	1	–	1
Tufts		–		5	–	1	–	2
Penn State		–		7	–	2	–	0
Lafayette		–		8	–	3	–	0
Princeton		–		6	–	2	–	0
Franklin & Marshall		–		6	–	2	–	0
Temple		–		3	–	1	–	1
Geneva		–		6	–	3	–	0
Wesleyan		–		6	–	3	–	0
Allegheny		–		5	–	3	–	0
Swarthmore		–		5	–	3	–	0
Army		–		5	–	3	–	1
Lehigh		–		6	–	4	–	0
Holy Cross		–		3	–	2	–	2
Brown		–		5	–	4	–	1
Fordham		–		4	–	4	–	0
NYU		–		4	–	4	–	1
Middlebury		–		3	–	4	–	2
Muhlenberg		–		4	–	5	–	0
Yale		–		4	–	5	–	0
Boston College		–		3	–	4	–	0
Penn		–		3	–	5	–	2
WPI		–		3	–	5	–	1
Buffalo		–		3	–	5	–	0
Carlisle		–		3	–	6	–	2
Rhode Island State		–		3	–	5	–	0
New Hampshire		–		3	–	6	–	1
Gettysburg		–		3	–	6	–	0
Rochester		–		3	–	6	–	0
Bucknell		–		2	–	6	–	3
Vermont		–		1	–	4	–	2
Williams		–		1	–	7	–	0

The 1915 Columbia Lions football team was an American football team that represented Columbia University as an independent during the 1915 college football season. Playing their first season in 10 years, the Lions were led by head coach T. Nelson Metcalf to a 5–0 record, outscoring opponents 126 to 28. The team played its home games on South Field, part of the university's campus in Morningside Heights in Upper Manhattan, with temporary grandstands to accommodate spectators.

== Schedule ==
Date	Opponent	Site	Result	Attendance	Source
October 23	St. Lawrence	South Field; New York, NY	W 57–0	5,000	
November 2	Stevens	South Field; New York, NY	W 15–6	7,000	
November 6	Connecticut	South Field; New York, NY	W 17–6		
November 20	NYU	South Field; New York, NY	W 19–16	7,000	
November 25	Wesleyan	South Field; New York, NY	W 18–0	8,000	
