= 1915 Penn Quakers football team =

American college football season

1915 Penn Quakers football
- Conference: Independent
- Record: 3–5–2
- Head coach: George H. Brooke (3rd season)
- Captain: Ned Harris
- Home stadium: Franklin Field

1915 Eastern college football independents records
	Conf.			Overall
Team	W	L	T	W		L		T
Cornell		–		9	–	0	–	0
Pittsburgh		–		8	–	0	–	0
Columbia		–		5	–	0	–	0
Harvard		–		8	–	1	–	0
Carnegie Tech		–		7	–	1	–	0
Rutgers		–		7	–	1	–	0
Villanova		–		6	–	1	–	0
Washington & Jefferson		–		8	–	1	–	1
Colgate		–		5	–	1	–	0
Syracuse		–		9	–	1	–	2
Dartmouth		–		7	–	1	–	1
Tufts		–		5	–	1	–	2
Penn State		–		7	–	2	–	0
Lafayette		–		8	–	3	–	0
Princeton		–		6	–	2	–	0
Franklin & Marshall		–		6	–	2	–	0
Temple		–		3	–	1	–	1
Geneva		–		6	–	3	–	0
Wesleyan		–		6	–	3	–	0
Allegheny		–		5	–	3	–	0
Swarthmore		–		5	–	3	–	0
Army		–		5	–	3	–	1
Lehigh		–		6	–	4	–	0
Holy Cross		–		3	–	2	–	2
Brown		–		5	–	4	–	1
Fordham		–		4	–	4	–	0
NYU		–		4	–	4	–	1
Middlebury		–		3	–	4	–	2
Muhlenberg		–		4	–	5	–	0
Yale		–		4	–	5	–	0
Boston College		–		3	–	4	–	0
Penn		–		3	–	5	–	2
WPI		–		3	–	5	–	1
Buffalo		–		3	–	5	–	0
Carlisle		–		3	–	6	–	2
Rhode Island State		–		3	–	5	–	0
New Hampshire		–		3	–	6	–	1
Gettysburg		–		3	–	6	–	0
Rochester		–		3	–	6	–	0
Bucknell		–		2	–	6	–	3
Vermont		–		1	–	4	–	2
Williams		–		1	–	7	–	0

The 1915 Penn Quakers football team was an American football team that represented the University of Pennsylvania in the 1915 college football season. In their third and final season under head coach George H. Brooke, the Quakers compiled a 3–5–2 record and outscored opponents by a total of 109 to 88.

== Schedule ==
Date	Opponent	Site	Result	Attendance	Source
September 25	West Virginia	Franklin Field; Philadelphia, PA	W 7–0		
September 29	Albright	Franklin Field; Philadelphia, PA	W 63–0		
October 2	Franklin & Marshall	Franklin Field; Philadelphia, PA	W 10–6		
October 9	Penn State	Franklin Field; Philadelphia, PA	L 3–13		
October 16	at Navy	Worden Field; Annapolis, MD	T 7–7		
October 23	Pittsburgh	Franklin Field; Philadelphia, PA	L 7–14	15,000–20,000	
October 30	Lafayette	Franklin Field; Philadelphia, PA	L 0–17		
November 6	vs. Dartmouth	Fenway Park; Boston, MA	L 3–7		
November 13	Michigan	Franklin Field; Philadelphia, PA	T 0–0		
November 25	Cornell	Franklin Field; Philadelphia, PA (rivalry)	L 9–24	20,000	
