= Stephen Mahoney =

American football player and coach (1890–1974)

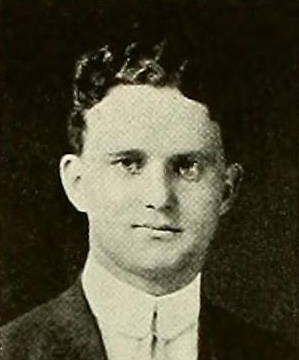

Biographical details
- Born: 1890; Somerville, Massachusetts, U.S.
- Died: February 17, 1974 (aged 83); Cambridge, Massachusetts, U.S.
- Education: Boston College

Playing career
- 1908: Holy Cross
- Position: Running back

Coaching career (HC unless noted)
- 1909: Somerville HS (MA) (assistant)
- 1910: Boston College HS (MA)
- 1911–1913: Somerville HS (MA)
- 1914–1915: Boston College

Head coaching record
- Overall: 8–8 (college)

Stephen H. Mahoney (1890 – February 17, 1974) was an American football player and coach and a longtime municipal recreation official.

== Early life ==
Mahoney was born in Somerville, Massachusetts, in 1890. He was a standout football player at Somerville High School. In 1908 he attended the College of the Holy Cross, where he played running back on the school's football team and was a baseball outfielder. In 1909 he transferred to Boston College. He played first base for the Eagles baseball team and was captain in 1911. He decided not to try out for the football team and instead assisted head coach Thomas H. Maguire. He also served as an assistant coach at his alma mater, Somerville High. He graduated from Boston College in 1912.

== Coaching ==
In 1910, Mahoney was named head football coach at Boston College High School. At the end of the season he returned to Somerville High, this time as head football coach. He was also an English and history teacher and submaster at Somerville High. Mahoney served as the head football coach at Boston College from 1914 to 1915, where he compiled a record of 8–8.

== Recreation official ==
In 1912, Mahoney began working for the Somerville department of recreation. From 1912 to 1922 he was director of summer recreational work. He also spent two years as director of winter work. In 1923 he became Cambridge, Massachusetts' first director of recreation. He was later given control of the city's parks department as well.

Mahoney died on February 17, 1974, in Cambridge, Massachusetts.

== Head coaching record ==
=== College ===
Year	Team	Overall	Conference	Standing	Bowl/playoffs
Boston College (Independent) (1914–1915)
1914	Boston College	5–4			
1915	Boston College	3–4			
Boston College:		8–8			
Total:		8–8			
