= 1915 Buffalo Bisons football team =

American college football season

1915 Buffalo Bisons football
- Conference: Independent
- Record: 3–5
- Head coach: Frank Mount Pleasant (1st season)
- Home stadium: International Park, Buffalo Baseball Park

1915 Eastern college football independents records
	Conf.			Overall
Team	W	L	T	W		L		T
Cornell		–		9	–	0	–	0
Pittsburgh		–		8	–	0	–	0
Columbia		–		5	–	0	–	0
Harvard		–		8	–	1	–	0
Carnegie Tech		–		7	–	1	–	0
Rutgers		–		7	–	1	–	0
Villanova		–		6	–	1	–	0
Washington & Jefferson		–		8	–	1	–	1
Colgate		–		5	–	1	–	0
Syracuse		–		9	–	1	–	2
Dartmouth		–		7	–	1	–	1
Tufts		–		5	–	1	–	2
Penn State		–		7	–	2	–	0
Lafayette		–		8	–	3	–	0
Princeton		–		6	–	2	–	0
Franklin & Marshall		–		6	–	2	–	0
Temple		–		3	–	1	–	1
Geneva		–		6	–	3	–	0
Wesleyan		–		6	–	3	–	0
Allegheny		–		5	–	3	–	0
Swarthmore		–		5	–	3	–	0
Army		–		5	–	3	–	1
Lehigh		–		6	–	4	–	0
Holy Cross		–		3	–	2	–	2
Brown		–		5	–	4	–	1
Fordham		–		4	–	4	–	0
NYU		–		4	–	4	–	1
Middlebury		–		3	–	4	–	2
Muhlenberg		–		4	–	5	–	0
Yale		–		4	–	5	–	0
Boston College		–		3	–	4	–	0
Penn		–		3	–	5	–	2
WPI		–		3	–	5	–	1
Buffalo		–		3	–	5	–	0
Carlisle		–		3	–	6	–	2
Rhode Island State		–		3	–	5	–	0
New Hampshire		–		3	–	6	–	1
Gettysburg		–		3	–	6	–	0
Rochester		–		3	–	6	–	0
Bucknell		–		2	–	6	–	3
Vermont		–		1	–	4	–	2
Williams		–		1	–	7	–	0

The 1915 Buffalo Bisons football team was an American football team that represented the University of Buffalo—now known as the University at Buffalo—as an independent during the 1915 college football season. Led by Frank Mount Pleasant in his first and only year as head coach, the team compiled a record of 3–5.

== Schedule ==
Date	Time	Opponent	Site	Result	Attendance	Source
October 9	2:30 p.m.	at Syracuse freshmen	Syracuse, NY	L 0–48		
October 16	3:00 p.m.	St. Bonaventure	International Park; Buffalo, NY	W 6–0	6,000	
October 27		at Alfred	Alfred Stadium; Alfred, NY	L 0–6	600	
November 2		Thiel	Buffalo Baseball Park; Buffalo, NY	W 21–0	1,000	
November 6	2:15 p.m.	Geneva	International Park; Buffalo, NY	L 0–29		
November 13	2:30 p.m.	Grove City	International Park; Buffalo, NY	L 7–10		
November 20		at Rochester	Rochester, NY	W 7–3		
November 25		Hobart	International Park; Buffalo, NY	L 6–20	3,000	
