= 1915 Brown Bears football team =

American college football season

1915 Brown Bears football
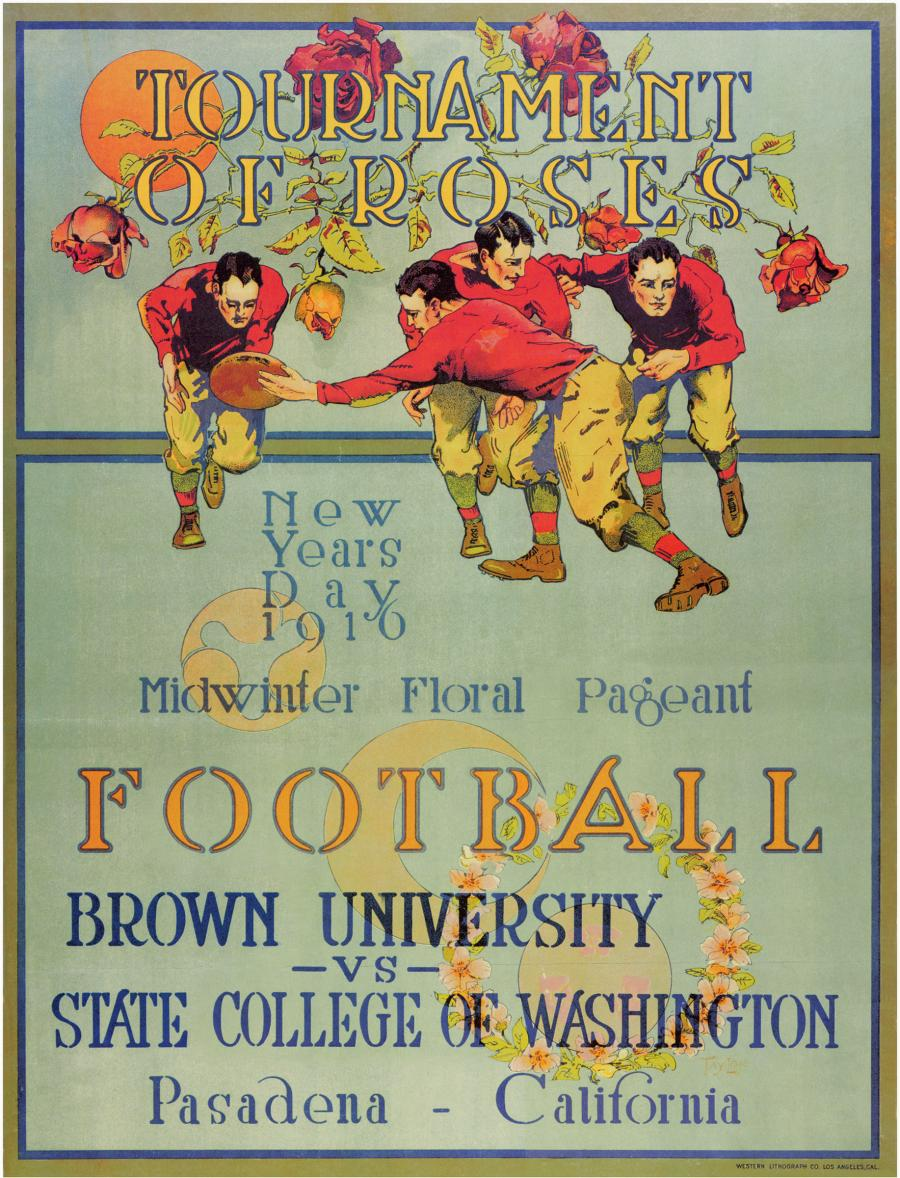
- 1916 Rose Bowl program

Rose Bowl, L 0–14 vs. Washington State
- Conference: Independent
- Record: 5–4–1
- Head coach: Edward N. Robinson (14th season)
- Home stadium: Andrews Field

1915 Eastern college football independents records
	Conf.			Overall
Team	W	L	T	W		L		T
Cornell		–		9	–	0	–	0
Pittsburgh		–		8	–	0	–	0
Columbia		–		5	–	0	–	0
Harvard		–		8	–	1	–	0
Carnegie Tech		–		7	–	1	–	0
Rutgers		–		7	–	1	–	0
Villanova		–		6	–	1	–	0
Washington & Jefferson		–		8	–	1	–	1
Colgate		–		5	–	1	–	0
Syracuse		–		9	–	1	–	2
Dartmouth		–		7	–	1	–	1
Tufts		–		5	–	1	–	2
Penn State		–		7	–	2	–	0
Lafayette		–		8	–	3	–	0
Princeton		–		6	–	2	–	0
Franklin & Marshall		–		6	–	2	–	0
Temple		–		3	–	1	–	1
Geneva		–		6	–	3	–	0
Wesleyan		–		6	–	3	–	0
Allegheny		–		5	–	3	–	0
Swarthmore		–		5	–	3	–	0
Army		–		5	–	3	–	1
Lehigh		–		6	–	4	–	0
Holy Cross		–		3	–	2	–	2
Brown		–		5	–	4	–	1
Fordham		–		4	–	4	–	0
NYU		–		4	–	4	–	1
Middlebury		–		3	–	4	–	2
Muhlenberg		–		4	–	5	–	0
Yale		–		4	–	5	–	0
Boston College		–		3	–	4	–	0
Penn		–		3	–	5	–	2
WPI		–		3	–	5	–	1
Buffalo		–		3	–	5	–	0
Carlisle		–		3	–	6	–	2
Rhode Island State		–		3	–	5	–	0
New Hampshire		–		3	–	6	–	1
Gettysburg		–		3	–	6	–	0
Rochester		–		3	–	6	–	0
Bucknell		–		2	–	6	–	3
Vermont		–		1	–	4	–	2
Williams		–		1	–	7	–	0

The 1915 Brown Bears football team was an American football team that represented Brown University as an independent during the 1915 college football season. In its 14th season under head coach Edward N. Robinson, Brown compiled a 5–3–1 record in the regular season, lost to Washington State in the second Rose Bowl game, and outscored all opponents by a total of 166 to 46. The team played home games at Andrews Field in Providence, Rhode Island.

Notable players included Fritz Pollard and Wallace Wade.

== Schedule ==
Date	Opponent	Site	Result	Attendance	Source
September 25	Rhode Island State	Andrews Field; Providence, RI (rivalry)	W 38–0		
October 2	Trinity (CT)	Andrews Field; Providence, RI	T 0–0		
October 9	at Amherst	Pratt Field; Amherst, MA	L 0–7		
October 16	Williams	Andrews Field; Providence, RI	W 33–0		
October 23	Syracuse	Andrews Field; Providence, RI	L 0–6		
October 30	Vermont	Andrews Field; Providence, RI	W 46–0		
November 6	at Yale	Yale Bowl; New Haven, CT	W 3–0		
November 13	Harvard	Harvard Stadium; Boston, MA	L 7–16		
November 27	Carlisle	Andrews Field; Providence, RI	W 39–3		
January 1, 1916	vs. Washington State	Rose Bowl; Pasadena, CA (Rose Bowl)	L 0–14	10,000	
