= 1915 Cornell Big Red football team =

American college football season

1915 Cornell Big Red football

National champion (Helms, Houlgate, NCF) Co-national champion (Parke H. Davis)
- Conference: Independent
- Record: 9–0
- Head coach: Albert Sharpe (4th season)
- Captain: Charley Barrett
- Home stadium: Schoellkopf Field

1915 Eastern college football independents records
	Conf.			Overall
Team	W	L	T	W		L		T
Cornell		–		9	–	0	–	0
Pittsburgh		–		8	–	0	–	0
Columbia		–		5	–	0	–	0
Harvard		–		8	–	1	–	0
Carnegie Tech		–		7	–	1	–	0
Rutgers		–		7	–	1	–	0
Villanova		–		6	–	1	–	0
Washington & Jefferson		–		8	–	1	–	1
Colgate		–		5	–	1	–	0
Syracuse		–		9	–	1	–	2
Dartmouth		–		7	–	1	–	1
Tufts		–		5	–	1	–	2
Penn State		–		7	–	2	–	0
Lafayette		–		8	–	3	–	0
Princeton		–		6	–	2	–	0
Franklin & Marshall		–		6	–	2	–	0
Temple		–		3	–	1	–	1
Geneva		–		6	–	3	–	0
Wesleyan		–		6	–	3	–	0
Allegheny		–		5	–	3	–	0
Swarthmore		–		5	–	3	–	0
Army		–		5	–	3	–	1
Lehigh		–		6	–	4	–	0
Holy Cross		–		3	–	2	–	2
Brown		–		5	–	4	–	1
Fordham		–		4	–	4	–	0
NYU		–		4	–	4	–	1
Middlebury		–		3	–	4	–	2
Muhlenberg		–		4	–	5	–	0
Yale		–		4	–	5	–	0
Boston College		–		3	–	4	–	0
Penn		–		3	–	5	–	2
WPI		–		3	–	5	–	1
Buffalo		–		3	–	5	–	0
Carlisle		–		3	–	6	–	2
Rhode Island State		–		3	–	5	–	0
New Hampshire		–		3	–	6	–	1
Gettysburg		–		3	–	6	–	0
Rochester		–		3	–	6	–	0
Bucknell		–		2	–	6	–	3
Vermont		–		1	–	4	–	2
Williams		–		1	–	7	–	0

The 1915 Cornell Big Red football team was an American football team that represented Cornell University as an independent during the 1915 college football season. In its fourth season under head coach Albert Sharpe, the Big Red compiled a 9–0 record, shut out four of nine opponents, and outscored all opponents by a total of 287 to 50. The 1915 team was known as The Big Red Machine, defeating every opponent by more than a touchdown.

At the end of the season the team was named as the year's champion by The New York Times. Cornell was later retroactively named as the national champion by NCAA-designated "major selectors" the Helms Athletic Foundation, Houlgate System, and National Championship Foundation, and as a co-national champion (with Pittsburgh) by Parke H. Davis.

Two Cornell players were consensus first-team selections on the 1915 All-American football team: quarterback Charley Barrett and end Murray Shelton. Both of them were later inducted into the College Football Hall of Fame. Barrett has been called the best quarterback of the 1910s.

== Schedule ==
Date	Time	Opponent	Site	Result	Attendance	Source
September 28	3:00 p.m.	Gettysburg	Schoellkopf Field; Ithaca, NY	W 13–0	7,000	
October 2	3:00 p.m.	Oberlin	Schoellkopf Field; Ithaca, NY	W 34–7		
October 9		Williams	Schoellkopf Field; Ithaca, NY	W 46–6	6,000	
October 16		Bucknell	Schoellkopf Field; Ithaca, NY	W 41–0		
October 23		at Harvard	Harvard Stadium; Boston, MA	W 10–0	25,000	
October 30		VPI	Schoellkopf Field; Ithaca, NY	W 45–0		
November 6		at Michigan	Ferry Field; Ann Arbor, MI	W 34–7	22,000	
November 13		Washington and Lee	Schoellkopf Field; Ithaca, NY	W 40–21		
November 25		at Penn	Franklin Field; Philadelphia, PA (rivalry)	W 24–9	20,000	

1915 Big Red players

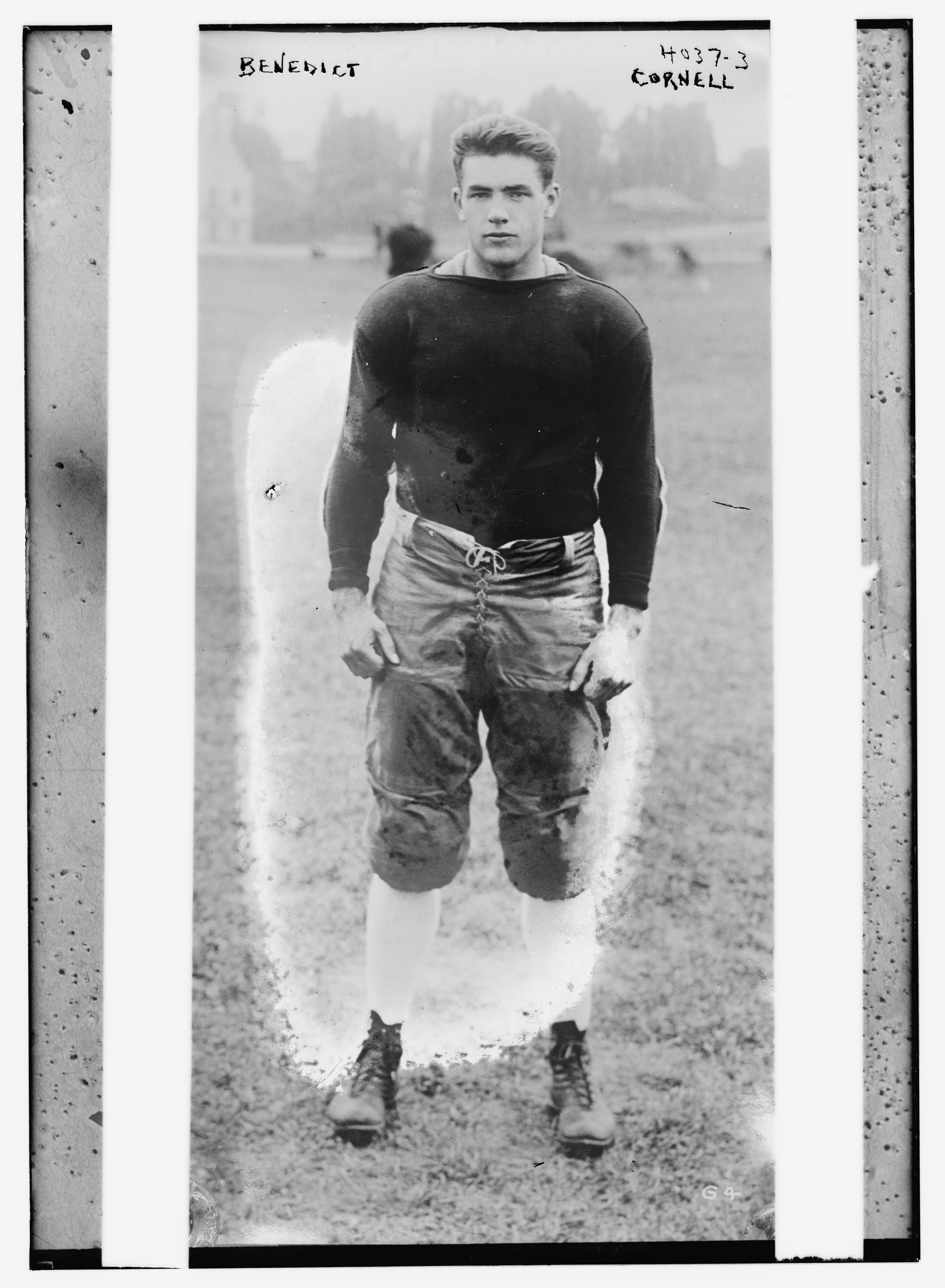
Benedict

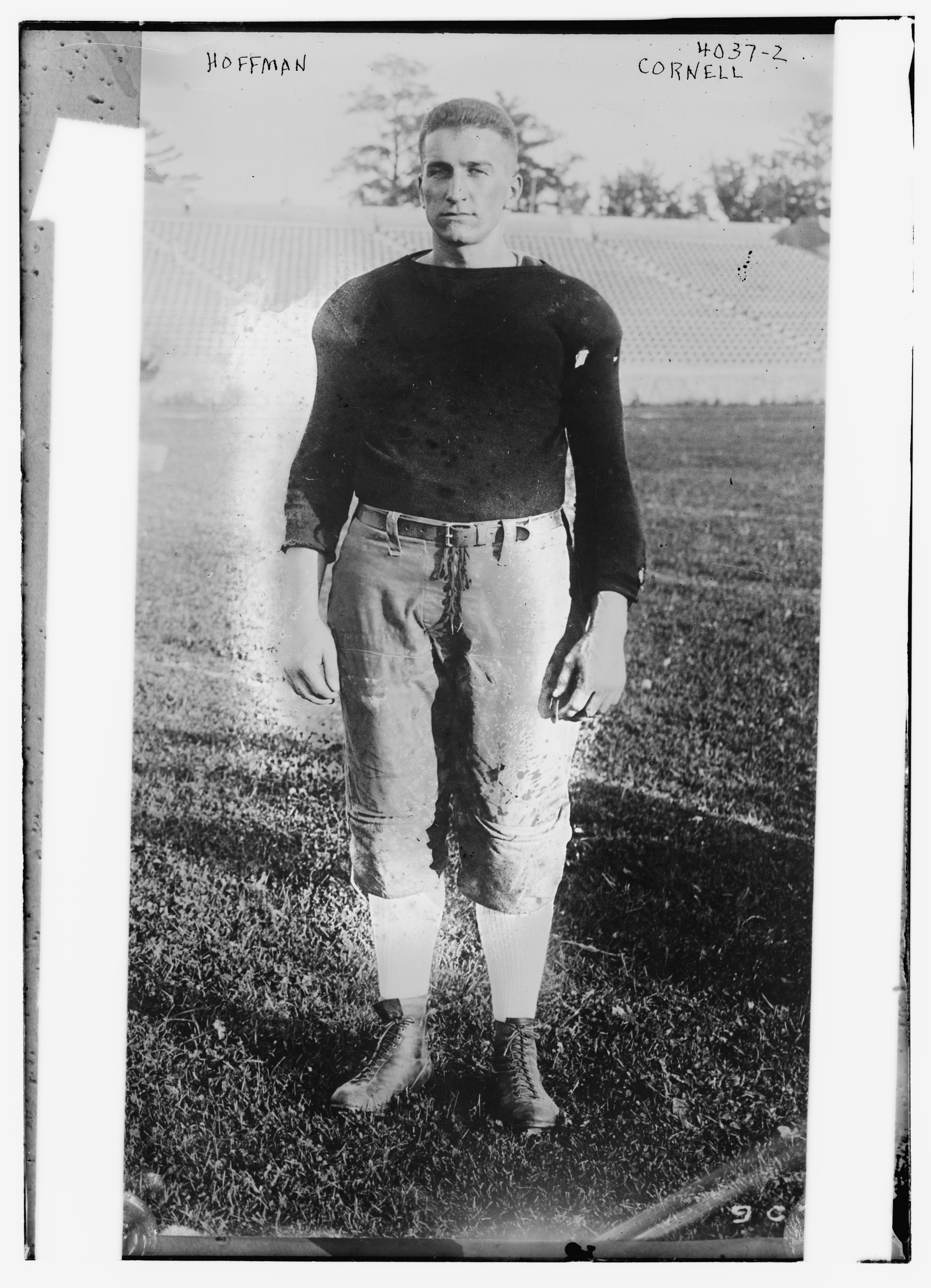
Hoffman

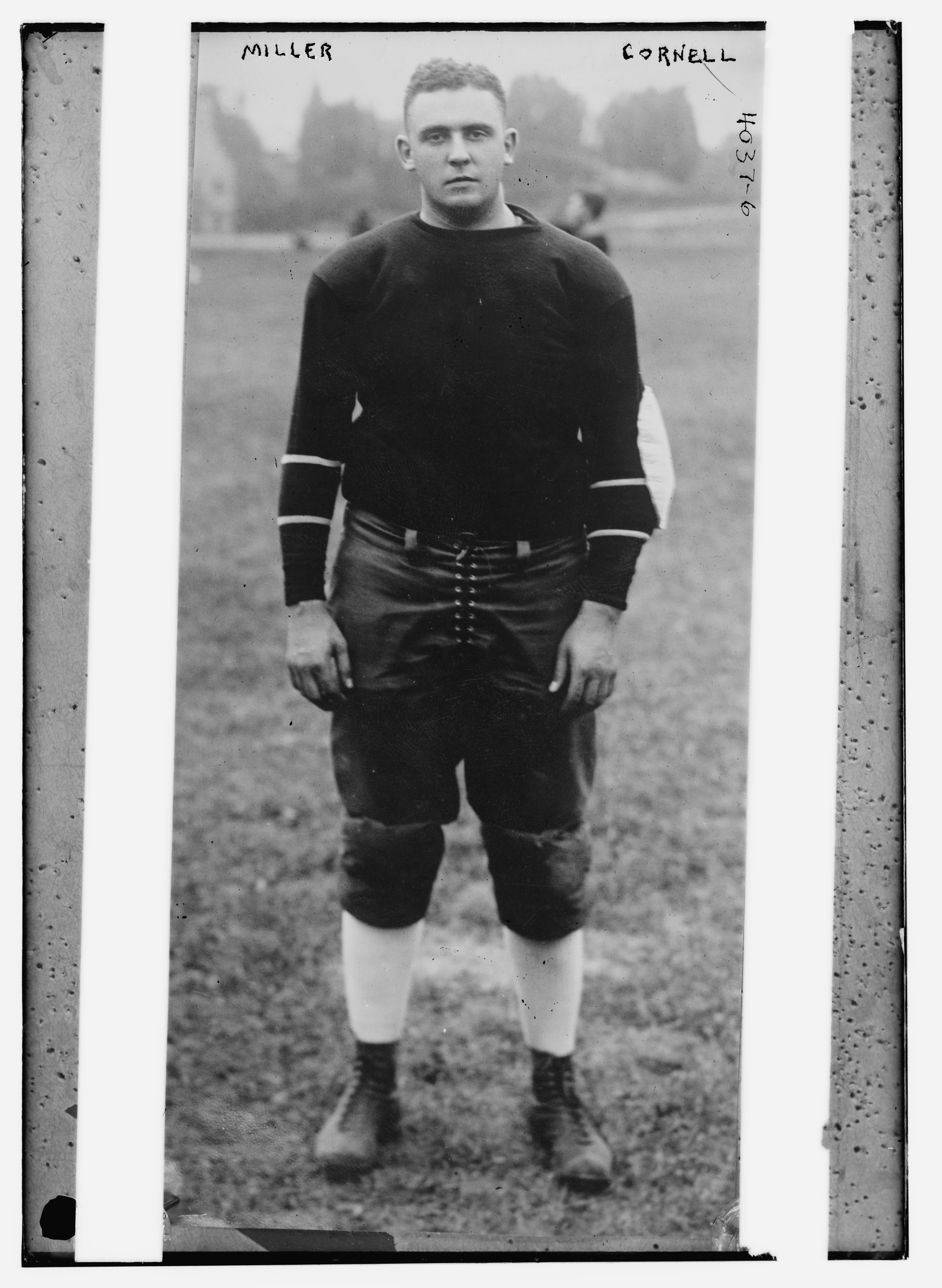
Miller

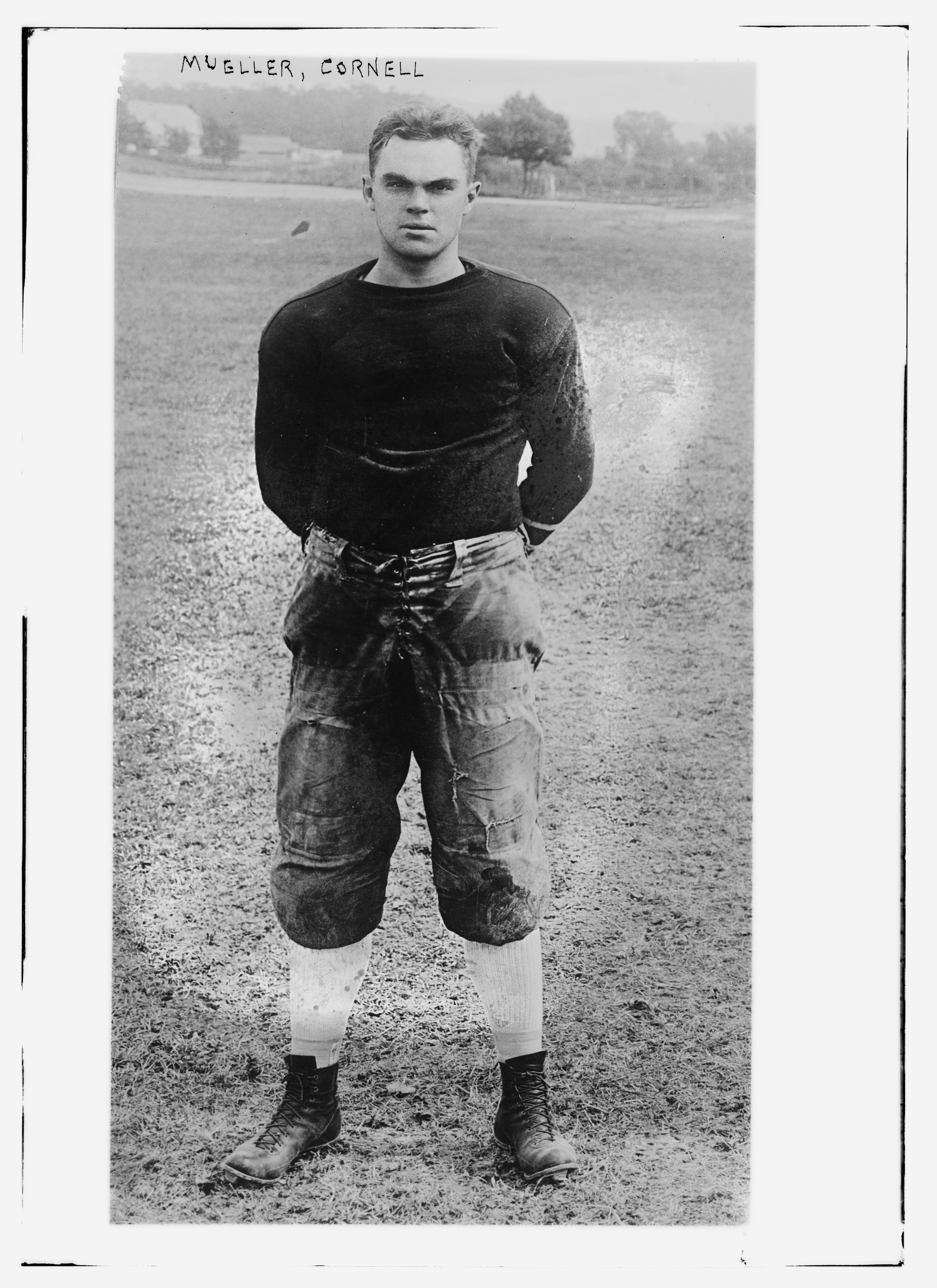
Mueller
