= Bill Wood (American football) =

American football player and coach (1894–1966)

Biographical details
- Born: November 15, 1894; Pottstown, Pennsylvania, U.S.
- Died: August 20, 1966 (aged 71); York, Pennsylvania, U.S.

Playing career
- 1913–1915: Penn State
- Positions: Center, tackle

Coaching career (HC unless noted)
- 1919–1926: Gettysburg
- 1927–1929: Wesleyan

Head coaching record
- Overall: 51–36–7

William Wallace Wood (November 15, 1894 – August 20, 1966) was an American football player and coach. He served as the head football coach at Gettysburg College from 1919 to 1926 and at Wesleyan University from 1927 to 1929, compiling a career college football record of 51–36–7. Wood played football at Pennsylvania State College from 1913 to 1915. While coaching at Wesleyan, Wood earned a degree from the Yale Divinity School.

Wood was born on November 15, 1894, in Pottstown, Pennsylvania. He was ordained a Presbyterian minister and was appointed chaplain at Sailors' Snug Harbor in Staten Island, New York, in 1939. He remained there until 1957, when he retired to a farm in Gettysburg, Pennsylvania. Wood died of a blood disorder on August 20, 1966, at a hospital in York, Pennsylvania.

== Head coaching record ==
Year	Team	Overall	Conference	Standing	Bowl/playoffs
Gettysburg Bullets (Independent) (1919–1925)
1919	Gettysburg	7–2			
1920	Gettysburg	6–2–1			
1921	Gettysburg	3–5–1			
1922	Gettysburg	6–2–1			
1923	Gettysburg	8–2			
1924	Gettysburg	4–5			
1925	Gettysburg	6–1–2			
Gettysburg Bullets (Eastern Pennsylvania Collegiate Conference) (1919–1925)
1926	Gettysburg	6–3–1	3–1	2nd	
Gettysburg:		43–22–6	3–1		
Wesleyan Methodists (Independent) (1927–1929)
1927	Wesleyan	3–5			
1928	Wesleyan	4–3–1			
1929	Wesleyan	1–6			
Wesleyan:		8–14–1			
Total:		51–36–7			
