= Joseph Gilman (tackle) =

American football player

Harvard Crimson
- Position: Tackle

Personal information
- Born: Honolulu, Hawaii in 1891

Career information
- College: Harvard (1915)

Awards and highlights
- National champion (1913); Consensus All-American (1915)

Joseph Atherton Gilman was an All-American football player at Harvard University. A native of Honolulu, Hawaii, Gilman attended Exeter before enrolling at Harvard. As a freshman, Gilman played on Harvard's freshman football team in 1912, and varsity in 1913. In his third year at Harvard, he was declared ineligible due to poor academic performance. He returned to Harvard in 1915 and "came through in a marvelously gritty manner, winning his old position at tackle back and eventually winning the choice on all the leading selections for All-American tackles." Gilman was the first football player from Hawaii to be named as an All-American. In December 1915, as a reward for his "plucky comeback," Gilman was voted by his teammates as captain of Harvard's 1916 football team. In March 1916, after being selected as captain, Gilman was expelled by Harvard's Administrative Board due to poor academic performance. He died in Honolulu in 1983.

== Ancestry ==
His grandfather was Henry D Gilman of Connecticut. His grandmother, Sarah Atherton was the sister of Joseph Ballard Atherton, who relocated to Honolulu from Readville, Massachusetts in 1875. His father, Joseph A. Gilman (1864-1936) was a Honolulu shipping and commission merchant who was active in the real estate business in Honolulu, and who died in Berkeley, California.
