= 1915 college football season =

American college football season

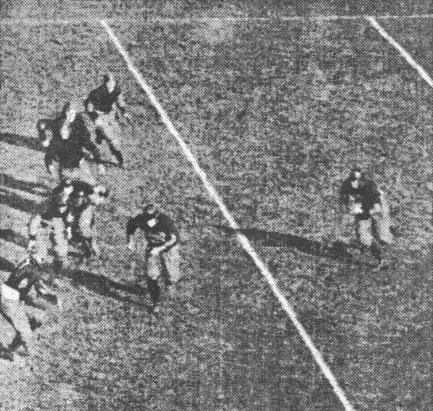
- Eddie Mahan runs against Princeton
- Number of bowls: 1
- Champion(s): Cornell; Pittsburgh

The 1915 college football season had no clear-cut champion, with the Official NCAA Division I Football Records Book listing Cornell, Minnesota, Oklahoma, and Pittsburgh as having been selected national champions in later years. Only Cornell (named by four major selectors) and Pittsburgh (named by one) claim national championships for the 1915 season.

== Conference and program changes ==
=== Conference establishments ===
- The Southwest Intercollegiate Athletic Conference, later known as the Southwest Conference, began its first season of play in 1915. The league had eight founding members in Arkansas, Oklahoma, and Texas.
- The Southern California Intercollegiate Athletic Conference, now a Division III conference, began football play in 1915.

=== Membership changes ===
School	1914 Conference	1915 Conference
Akron football	Independent	Ohio Athletic
Arkansas Razorbacks	Independent	Southwest
Baylor Bears	Independent	Southwest
California Golden Bears	Program reinstated	Independent
University Farm Cal Aggies	Program Established	Independent
Chattanooga Mocs	Independent	SIAA
Catholic Cardinals	Independent	SAIAA
Louisville Cardinals	Independent	SIAA
Oklahoma Sooners	Independent	Southwest
Oklahoma A&M Cowboys	Independent	Southwest
Rice Owls	Independent	Southwest
Southern Methodist Parsons	Program Established	TIAA
Southwestern (TX) Pirates	Independent	Southwest
Texas Longhorns	Independent	Southwest
Texas A&M Aggies	Independent	Southwest
Transylvania Pioneers	Independent	SIAA

== Rose Bowl ==
The Rose Bowl was played for the first time since its inception on January 1, 1902, following the 1901 season. Washington State defeated Brown, 14–0. The game has been played annually ever since.

== Conference standings ==
=== Major conference standings ===
1915 Missouri Valley Conference football standings
	Conf.					Overall
Team	W		L		T	W		L		T
Nebraska $	4	–	0	–	0	8	–	0	–	0
Kansas	3	–	1	–	0	6	–	2	–	0
Iowa State	2	–	1	–	0	6	–	2	–	0
Washington University	1	–	1	–	0	3	–	2	–	0
Missouri	1	–	3	–	1	2	–	5	–	1
Drake	1	–	4	–	0	2	–	6	–	0
Kansas State	0	–	2	–	1	3	–	4	–	1
$ – Conference champion

1915 Northwest Conference football standings
	Conf.					Overall
Team	W		L		T	W		L		T
Washington State ^ +	4	–	0	–	0	7	–	0	–	0
Washington +	1	–	0	–	0	7	–	0	–	0
Oregon	3	–	1	–	0	7	–	2	–	0
Oregon Agricultural	2	–	2	–	0	5	–	3	–	0
Idaho	0	–	3	–	1	1	–	4	–	1
Whitman	0	–	4	–	1	1	–	5	–	1
+ – Conference co-champions; ^ – Selected as Rose Bowl representative

1915 Rocky Mountain Conference football standings
	Conf.					Overall
Team	W		L		T	W		L		T
Colorado Agricultural $	7	–	0	–	0	7	–	0	–	0
Utah	4	–	2	–	0	5	–	2	–	0
Colorado Mines	4	–	2	–	0	4	–	2	–	0
Colorado College	3	–	2	–	0	6	–	2	–	0
Denver	2	–	3	–	0	4	–	3	–	0
Wyoming	1	–	5	–	0	2	–	6	–	0
Colorado	1	–	5	–	0	1	–	6	–	0
Utah Agricultural	0	–	3	–	0	3	–	4	–	0
$ – Conference champion

1915 South Atlantic Intercollegiate Athletic Association football standings
	Conf.					Overall
Team	W		L		T	W		L		T
Virginia +	2	–	0	–	0	8	–	1	–	0
Washington and Lee +	2	–	0	–	0	6	–	1	–	1
Georgetown +	2	–	0	–	0	7	–	2	–	0
Catholic University	1	–	0	–	0	5	–	2	–	0
Johns Hopkins	1	–	0	–	0	1	–	0	–	0
Richmond	0	–	1	–	0	4	–	4	–	1
VPI	0	–	1	–	0	4	–	4	–	0
North Carolina A&M	0	–	2	–	0	3	–	3	–	1
North Carolina	0	–	2	–	0	4	–	3	–	1
+ – Conference co-champions

1915 Southern Intercollegiate Athletic Association football standings
	Conf.					Overall
Team	W		L		T	W		L		T
Vanderbilt $	5	–	0	–	0	9	–	1	–	0
Alabama	5	–	0	–	0	6	–	2	–	0
LSU	4	–	0	–	0	6	–	2	–	0
Transylvania	3	–	0	–	1	7	–	1	–	1
Auburn	5	–	1	–	0	6	–	2	–	0
Georgia	3	–	1	–	1	5	–	2	–	2
Chattanooga	3	–	1	–	2	5	–	2	–	2
Mississippi A&M	4	–	2	–	1	5	–	2	–	1
Kentucky	2	–	1	–	1	6	–	1	–	1
Florida	3	–	3	–	0	4	–	3	–	0
Clemson	2	–	2	–	1	2	–	4	–	2
South Carolina	1	–	1	–	1	5	–	3	–	1
Furman	1	–	1	–	0	5	–	3	–	0
Mercer	2	–	3	–	0	5	–	4	–	0
Mississippi College	2	–	3	–	0	4	–	4	–	1
The Citadel	1	–	2	–	0	5	–	3	–	0
Sewanee	1	–	2	–	2	4	–	3	–	2
Tennessee	1	–	4	–	0	4	–	4	–	0
Tulane	1	–	4	–	0	4	–	4	–	0
Central University	0	–	3	–	1	3	–	5	–	1
Louisville	0	–	3	–	1	1	–	5	–	1
Howard (AL)	0	–	3	–	0	3	–	4	–	1
Wofford	0	–	3	–	0	3	–	5	–	0
Ole Miss	0	–	5	–	0	2	–	6	–	0
$ – Conference champion

1915 Southwest Conference football standings
	Conf.					Overall
Team	W		L		T	W		L		T
Oklahoma $	3	–	0	–	0	10	–	0	–	0
Baylor	3	–	0	–	0	7	–	1	–	0
Texas A&M	1	–	1	–	0	6	–	2	–	0
Texas	2	–	2	–	0	6	–	3	–	0
Arkansas	1	–	1	–	0	4	–	2	–	1
Rice	1	–	2	–	0	5	–	3	–	0
Oklahoma A&M	0	–	3	–	0	4	–	5	–	1
Southwestern (TX)	0	–	2	–	0	4	–	3	–	0
Baylor forfeited claim to co-champion for using ineligible player.

1915 Western Conference football standings
	Conf.					Overall
Team	W		L		T	W		L		T
Minnesota +	3	–	0	–	1	6	–	0	–	1
Illinois +	3	–	0	–	2	5	–	0	–	2
Chicago	4	–	2	–	0	5	–	2	–	0
Ohio State	2	–	1	–	1	5	–	1	–	1
Purdue	2	–	2	–	0	3	–	3	–	1
Wisconsin	2	–	3	–	0	4	–	3	–	0
Iowa	1	–	2	–	0	3	–	4	–	0
Indiana	1	–	3	–	0	3	–	3	–	1
Northwestern	0	–	5	–	0	2	–	5	–	0
+ – Conference co-champions

=== Independents ===
1915 Eastern college football independents records
	Conf.			Overall
Team	W	L	T	W		L		T
Cornell		–		9	–	0	–	0
Pittsburgh		–		8	–	0	–	0
Columbia		–		5	–	0	–	0
Harvard		–		8	–	1	–	0
Carnegie Tech		–		7	–	1	–	0
Rutgers		–		7	–	1	–	0
Villanova		–		6	–	1	–	0
Washington & Jefferson		–		8	–	1	–	1
Colgate		–		5	–	1	–	0
Syracuse		–		9	–	1	–	2
Dartmouth		–		7	–	1	–	1
Tufts		–		5	–	1	–	2
Penn State		–		7	–	2	–	0
Lafayette		–		8	–	3	–	0
Princeton		–		6	–	2	–	0
Franklin & Marshall		–		6	–	2	–	0
Temple		–		3	–	1	–	1
Geneva		–		6	–	3	–	0
Wesleyan		–		6	–	3	–	0
Allegheny		–		5	–	3	–	0
Swarthmore		–		5	–	3	–	0
Army		–		5	–	3	–	1
Lehigh		–		6	–	4	–	0
Holy Cross		–		3	–	2	–	2
Brown		–		5	–	4	–	1
Fordham		–		4	–	4	–	0
NYU		–		4	–	4	–	1
Middlebury		–		3	–	4	–	2
Muhlenberg		–		4	–	5	–	0
Yale		–		4	–	5	–	0
Boston College		–		3	–	4	–	0
Penn		–		3	–	5	–	2
WPI		–		3	–	5	–	1
Buffalo		–		3	–	5	–	0
Carlisle		–		3	–	6	–	2
Rhode Island State		–		3	–	5	–	0
New Hampshire		–		3	–	6	–	1
Gettysburg		–		3	–	6	–	0
Rochester		–		3	–	6	–	0
Bucknell		–		2	–	6	–	3
Vermont		–		1	–	4	–	2
Williams		–		1	–	7	–	0

1915 Midwestern college football independents records
	Conf.			Overall
Team	W	L	T	W		L		T
Dubuque		–		7	–	0	–	0
Carleton		–		6	–	0	–	0
Wabash		–		7	–	0	–	1
Notre Dame		–		7	–	1	–	0
Grinnell		–		6	–	1	–	0
Michigan Agricultural		–		5	–	1	–	0
Western State Normal		–		5	–	1	–	0
South Dakota State		–		5	–	1	–	1
Heidelberg		–		5	–	2	–	1
Millikin		–		5	–	2	–	1
Nebraska Wesleyan		–		6	–	3	–	0
St. Mary's (OH)		–		3	–	2	–	0
Michigan State Normal		–		4	–	2	–	1
Doane		–		5	–	3	–	0
Marquette		–		4	–	2	–	2
South Dakota		–		4	–	2	–	2
Jamestown		–		3	–	2	–	1
Penn (IA)		–		4	–	3	–	0
Michigan		–		4	–	3	–	1
Saint Louis		–		4	–	3	–	1
Creighton		–		3	–	3	–	1
Haskell		–		3	–	3	–	0
Iowa State Teachers		–		3	–	3	–	0
North Dakota Agricultural		–		3	–	3	–	0
St. Thomas (MN)		–		2	–	2	–	1
Hanover		–		2	–	4	–	0
Lake Forest		–		2	–	4	–	0
Northern Illinois State		–		2	–	5	–	1
Lawrence		–		2	–	5	–	0
Earlham		–		2	–	6	–	0
Detroit		–		1	–	5	–	0
Butler		–		1	–	6	–	0
Lincoln (MO)		–		0	–	2	–	0

1915 Southern college football independents records
	Conf.			Overall
Team	W	L	T	W		L		T
Georgia Tech		–		7	–	0	–	1
Ouachita Baptist		–		7	–	1	–	0
Dallas		–		6	–	1	–	0
Spring Hill		–		6	–	1	–	0
North Texas State Normal		–		5	–	1	–	1
Sam Houston Normal		–		5	–	1	–	1
West Virginia		–		5	–	1	–	1
Jonesboro Aggies		–		4	–	1	–	1
Johns Hopkins		–		6	–	2	–	0
VMI		–		6	–	2	–	1
Southwestern Louisiana Industrial		–		5	–	2	–	1
Delaware		–		6	–	3	–	0
Maryland		–		6	–	3	–	0
Louisiana Normal College		–		4	–	2	–	0
Southwest Texas State		–		5	–	3	–	2
Davidson		–		4	–	3	–	1
Mississippi Normal		–		4	–	3	–	0
West Tennessee State Normal		–		4	–	3	–	0
Guilford		–		1	–	1	–	0
Middle Tennessee State Normal		–		3	–	3	–	1
Birmingham		–		2	–	2	–	1
Presbyterian		–		4	–	4	–	0
Henderson-Brown		–		3	–	4	–	1
TCU		–		4	–	5	–	0
Wake Forest		–		3	–	4	–	0
Navy		–		3	–	5	–	1
Western Kentucky State Normal		–		1	–	4	–	2
Louisville		–		1	–	5	–	1
Marshall		–		1	–	7	–	0

1915 Western college football independents records
	Conf.			Overall
Team	W	L	T	W		L		T
Hawaii		–		5	–	1	–	1
New Mexico		–		3	–	1	–	0
New Mexico A&M		–		5	–	2	–	0
Montana A&M		–		4	–	2	–	1
Arizona		–		5	–	3	–	0
California		–		8	–	5	–	0
Tempe Normal		–		3	–	2	–	0
University Farm		–		3	–	2	–	0
Cheney Normal		–		1	–	1	–	0
Montana		–		2	–	2	–	2
Willamette		–		2	–	2	–	1
USC		–		3	–	4	–	0
Saint Mary's		–		3	–	7	–	0
Nevada		–		0	–	6	–	0

=== Minor conferences ===
Conference	Champion(s)	Record
Central Intercollegiate Athletics Association	Hampton Institute	3–0
Inter-Normal Athletic Conference of Wisconsin	River Falls Normal	5–0
Kansas Collegiate Athletic Conference	Baker (KS); Kansas State Normal	—
Kentucky Intercollegiate Athletic Association	Transylvania	—
Louisiana Intercollegiate Athletic Association	Louisiana Industrial	2–0–1
Michigan Intercollegiate Athletic Association	Albion; Alma	4–0–1
Ohio Athletic Conference	Western Reserve	6–1
Oklahoma Intercollegiate Conference	Central State Teachers	—
Southern California Intercollegiate Athletic Conference	Occidental	4–0
Southern Intercollegiate Athletic Conference	Fisk	—

=== Minor conference standings ===
1915 Colored Intercollegiate Athletic Association football standings
	Conf.					Overall
Team	W		L		T	W		L		T
Hampton $	3	–	0	–	0	4	–	0	–	0
Howard	1	–	1	–	0	2	–	1	–	0
Shaw	0	–	1	–	0	0	–	2	–	0
Virginia Union	0	–	2	–	0	3	–	2	–	0
$ – Conference champion

1915 Eastern Virginia Intercollegiate Athletic Association football standings
	Conf.					Overall
Team	W		L		T	W		L		T
Hampden–Sydney $	5	–	1	–	0	6	–	3	–	0
Richmond	3	–	2	–	1	4	–	4	–	1
Randolph–Macon	3	–	2	–	1	4	–	5	–	1
William & Mary	0	–	6	–	0	0	–	9	–	1
$ – Conference champion

1915 Illinois Intercollegiate Athletic Conference football standings
	Conf.					Overall
Team	W		L		T	W		L		T
Southern Illinois			–			6	–	2	–	0
Carthage	2	–	3	–	0	3	–	4	–	0

1915 Kansas Collegiate Athletic Conference football standings
	Conf.					Overall
Team	W		L		T	W		L		T
Baker +	4	–	0	–	0	5	–	3	–	0
Kansas State Normal +	4	–	0	–	1	5	–	2	–	2
Cooper	6	–	1	–	1	7	–	1	–	1
Friends	4	–	1	–	0	5	–	3	–	0
Kansas Wesleyan	5	–	3	–	0	5	–	4	–	0
Hays Normal	3	–	3	–	0	4	–	3	–	0
Southwestern (KS)	3	–	3	–	1	5	–	4	–	1
Pittsburg Normal	2	–	2	–	0	4	–	5	–	0
College of Emporia	3	–	5	–	0	3	–	5	–	0
Ottawa	2	–	4	–	1	4	–	4	–	1
Washburn	1	–	2	–	1	2	–	5	–	1
Fairmount	2	–	5	–	1	3	–	5	–	1
St. Mary's (KS)	1	–	4	–	0	3	–	5	–	0
Bethany (KS)	1	–	6	–	0	1	–	6	–	0
Kansas City University	0	–	2	–	0	0	–	4	–	0
+ – Conference co-champions

1915 Michigan Intercollegiate Athletic Association football standings
	Conf.					Overall
Team	W		L		T	W		L		T
Albion $	4	–	0	–	1	5	–	1	–	1
Alma	1	–	0	–	2	1	–	3	–	2
Olivet	2	–	1	–	2	3	–	3	–	2
Kalamazoo	2	–	2	–	0	3	–	2	–	0
Hillsdale	2	–	3	–	1	3	–	3	–	1
Adrian	0	–	5	–	0	2	–	5	–	0
+ – Conference co-champions

1915 Missouri Intercollegiate Athletic Association football standings
	Conf.					Overall
Team	W		L		T	W		L		T
William Jewell $	5	–	0	–	1	5	–	1	–	1
Springfield Normal	2	–	0	–	0	4	–	2	–	0
Westminster (MO)	3	–	1	–	1	3	–	2	–	2
Missouri Wesleyan	2	–	1	–	1	?	–	?	–	?
Tarkio	1	–	2	–	1	?	–	?	–	?
Central (MO)	2	–	4	–	0	2	–	5	–	0
Kirksville Normal	1	–	4	–	0	1	–	5	–	0
Missouri Valley	0	–	2	–	0	?	–	?	–	?
Drury	0	–	3	–	0	1	–	5	–	0
$ – Conference champion

1915 Ohio Athletic Conference football standings
	Conf.					Overall
Team	W		L		T	W		L		T
Western Reserve $	6	–	1	–	0	7	–	2	–	0
Miami (OH)	5	–	1	–	0	6	–	2	–	0
Denison	5	–	2	–	0	6	–	2	–	0
Ohio	2	–	1	–	0	8	–	1	–	0
Wooster	3	–	1	–	2	3	–	3	–	2
Case	4	–	2	–	1	5	–	5	–	1
Oberlin	3	–	3	–	0	4	–	4	–	0
Cincinnati	3	–	4	–	0	5	–	4	–	0
Ohio Wesleyan	3	–	3	–	0	4	–	5	–	0
Kenyon	1	–	6	–	0	3	–	6	–	0
Akron	1	–	6	–	0	1	–	7	–	1
Wittenberg	0	–	4	–	1	3	–	5	–	1
Mount Union	0	–	5	–	0	3	–	7	–	0
Baldwin–Wallace	0	–	0	–	0	0	–	0	–	0
Ohio State *	3	–	0	–	0	5	–	1	–	1
$ – Conference champion; * – did not complete for championship

1915 Wisconsin Normal Athletic Conference football standings
	Conf.					Overall
Team	W		L		T	W		L		T
River Falls Normal $	5	–	0	–	0	6	–	1	–	1
Whitewater Normal	3	–	1	–	0	4	–	2	–	1
La Crosse Normal	2	–	1	–	0	5	–	2	–	0
Milwaukee Normal	2	–	1	–	0	3	–	3	–	1
Oshkosh Normal	1	–	2	–	0	2	–	5	–	0
Stevens Point Normal	1	–	2	–	0	4	–	2	–	0
Stout Normal	0	–	1	–	0	0	–	3	–	1
Superior Normal	0	–	3	–	0	3	–	3	–	0
Platteville Normal	0	–	3	–	0	0	–	6	–	1
$ – Conference champion

== Awards and honors ==
=== All-Americans ===
The consensus All-America team included:

Position	Name	Height	Weight (lbs.)	Class	Hometown	Team
QB	Charley Barrett	6'0"	180	Sr.	Cleveland, Ohio	Cornell
HB	Dick King	5'8"	175	Sr.	Boston, Massachusetts	Harvard
HB	Bart Macomber	5'9"	183	Jr.	Oak Park, Illinois	Illinois
HB	Buck Mayer		172	Sr.	Norfolk, Virginia	Virginia
HB	Neno DaPrato	5'10"	185	Sr.	Iron Mountain, Michigan	Michigan Agricultural
FB	Eddie Mahan	5'11"	171	Sr.	Natick, Massachusetts	Harvard
E	Murray Shelton	6'1"	170	Sr.	Dunkirk, New York	Cornell
E	Bert Baston	6'1"	170	Jr.	St. Louis Park, Minnesota	Minnesota
T	Cub Buck			Sr.	Eau Claire, Wisconsin	Wisconsin
G	Clarence Spears			Sr.	De Witt, Arkansas	Dartmouth
C	Bob Peck	5'9"	179	So.	Lock Haven, Pennsylvania	Pittsburgh
G	Harold White	6'6"	273	Sr.	New York, New York	Syracuse
T	Joseph Gilman			Jr.	Honolulu, Hawaii	Harvard
E	Guy Chamberlin	6'2"	196	Sr.	Blue Springs, Nebraska	Nebraska
E	Bob Higgins			So.	Corning, New York	Penn State

== Statistical leaders ==
- Team scoring most points: Vanderbilt, 514 to 38.
- Player scoring most points: Jerry DaPrato, Michigan Agricultural, 185
- Player scoring most touchdowns: Jerry DaPrato, Michigan Agricultural, 34
- Player scoring most goals after touchdown: F. Parke Geyer, Oklahoma, 56
- Player scoring most field goals: William T. Van de Graaff, Alabama, 11
- Longest punt: Fritz Shiverick, Cornell, 86 yards, inclusive of roll of ball
- Longest run from kickoff: John Barrett, Washington & Lee, 101 yards
- Longest punt return: James DeHart, Pittsburgh, 105 yards
- Longest run from scrimmage: Dave Tayloe, North Carolina, and John R. Georgetown, 90 yards each
