= Allegheny Gators football =

- First season: 1893
- Head coach: Braden Layer; 3rd season, 8–22 (.267)
- Location: Meadville, Pennsylvania
- Stadium: Robertson Stadium (capacity: 3,500)
- Field: Frank B. Fuhrer Field
- NCAA division: Division III
- Conference: PAC
- Colors: Blue and gold

NCAA Division III championships
- 1990
- Website: Allegheny Gators

The Allegheny Gators football team represents Allegheny College, located in Meadville, Pennsylvania, in NCAA Division III college football.

The Gators, who began playing football in 1893, compete as members of the Presidents' Athletic Conference.

Allegheny's home games are played at Frank B. Fuhrer Field at Robertson Stadium.

== History ==
=== Conferences ===
- Presidents' Athletic Conference: 1958–1963, 2022–present
- North Coast Athletic Conference: 1984–2021

== Championships ==
=== National championships ===
Year	Association	Division	Head coach	Record	Opponent	Result
1990	NCAA (1)	Division III (1)	Ken O'Keefe	13–0–1 (7–0 NCAC)	Lycoming	W, 21–14 (OT)
