= 1915 Western Conference football season =

- Sport: Football
- Champion: Illinois & Minnesota

Football seasons
- ← 1914 1916 →

1915 Western Conference football standings
| | Conf. | | | | | Overall |
| Team | W | | L | | T | W | | L | | T |
|---|---|---|---|---|---|---|---|---|---|---|
| Minnesota + | 3 | – | 0 | – | 1 | 6 | – | 0 | – | 1 |
| Illinois + | 3 | – | 0 | – | 2 | 5 | – | 0 | – | 2 |
| Chicago | 4 | – | 2 | – | 0 | 5 | – | 2 | – | 0 |
| Ohio State | 2 | – | 1 | – | 1 | 5 | – | 1 | – | 1 |
| Purdue | 2 | – | 2 | – | 0 | 3 | – | 3 | – | 1 |
| Wisconsin | 2 | – | 3 | – | 0 | 4 | – | 3 | – | 0 |
| Iowa | 1 | – | 2 | – | 0 | 3 | – | 4 | – | 0 |
| Indiana | 1 | – | 3 | – | 0 | 3 | – | 3 | – | 1 |
| Northwestern | 0 | – | 5 | – | 0 | 2 | – | 5 | – | 0 |
+ – Conference co-champions

The 1915 Western Conference football season was the twentieth season of college football played by the member schools of the Western Conference (later known as the Big Ten Conference) and was a part of the 1915 college football season.

== Season overview ==
After finishing second and first in league play the year before, Minnesota and Illinois shared the 1915 Western title with conference records of 3-0-1 and 3-0-2 respectively.

Chicago would finish in third place for a second consecutive year at 5-2 (4-2 WC). Ohio State was fourth at 5-1-1 (2-1-1 WC). Purdue came in fifth at 3-3-1 (2-2 WC).

Wisconsin went 4-3 (2-3 WC), Iowa was 3-4 (1-2 WC), Indiana went 3-3-1 (1-3 WC), and Northwestern finished in last place for a third consecutive year at 2-5 (0-5 WC).

=== Minnesota ===
| Date | Opponent | Site | Result | Attendance | Source |
|---|---|---|---|---|---|
| October 2 | North Dakota* | Northrop Field; Minneapolis, MN | W 41–0 | 3,000–5,000 | |
| October 9 | Iowa State* | Northrop Field; Minneapolis, MN | W 34–6 | 6,000 | |
| October 16 | South Dakota* | Northrop Field; Minneapolis, MN | W 19–0 | 2,000 | |
| October 23 | Iowa | Northrop Field; Minneapolis, MN (rivalry) | W 51–13 | 6,000 | |
| October 30 | at Illinois | Illinois Field; Champaign, IL | T 6–6 | 11,553 | |
| November 13 | Chicago | Northrop Field; Minneapolis, MN | W 20–7 | 20,000 | |
| November 20 | at Wisconsin | Randall Field; Madison, WI (rivalry) | W 20–3 | 13,500 | |
*Non-conference game

=== Illinois ===
| Date | Opponent | Site | Result | Attendance | Source |
|---|---|---|---|---|---|
| October 2 | Haskell* | Illinois Field; Champaign, IL | W 36–0 | 3,193 | |
| October 9 | Missouri Mines* | Illinois Field; Champaign, IL | W 75–7 | 2,969 | |
| October 16 | at Ohio State | Ohio Field; Columbus, OH (rivalry) | T 3–3 | 6,634 | |
| October 23 | Northwestern | Illinois Field; Champaign, IL | W 36–6 | 4,424 | |
| October 30 | Minnesota^{†} | Illinois Field; Champaign, IL | T 6–6 | 11,593 | |
| November 13 | Wisconsin | Illinois Field; Champaign, IL | W 17–3 | 3,788 | |
| November 20 | at Chicago | Stagg Field; Chicago, IL | W 10–0 | 24,078 | |
*Non-conference game; ^{†}Homecoming

=== Chicago ===
| Date | Opponent | Site | Result | Attendance | Source |
|---|---|---|---|---|---|
| October 9 | at Northwestern | Northwestern Field; Evanston, IL | W 7–0 | | |
| October 16 | Indiana | Stagg Field; Chicago, IL | W 13–7 | > 10,000 | |
| October 23 | Purdue | Stagg Field; Chicago, IL (rivalry) | W 7–0 | | |
| October 30 | Wisconsin | Stagg Field; Chicago, IL | W 14–13 | | |
| November 6 | Haskell* | Stagg Field; Chicago, IL | W 35–0 | | |
| November 13 | at Minnesota | Northrop Field; Minneapolis, MN | L 7–20 | 20,000 | |
| November 20 | Illinois | Stagg Field; Chicago, IL | L 0–10 | 24,078 | |
*Non-conference game

=== Ohio State ===
| Date | Opponent | Site | Result | Attendance |
|---|---|---|---|---|
| October 2 | Ohio Wesleyan | Ohio Field; Columbus, OH | W 19–6 | |
| October 9 | Case | Ohio Field; Columbus, OH | W 14–0 | |
| October 16 | Illinois | Ohio Field; Columbus, OH (rivalry) | T 3–3 | 6,634 |
| October 23 | at Wisconsin | Randall Field; Madison, WI | L 0–21 | |
| November 6 | Indiana | Ohio Field; Columbus, OH | W 10–9 | |
| November 13 | Oberlin | Ohio Field; Columbus, OH | W 25–0 | |
| November 20 | at Northwestern | Northwestern Field; Evanston, IL | W 34–0 | |

=== Purdue ===
| Date | Opponent | Site | Result | Source |
|---|---|---|---|---|
| October 2 | Wabash* | Stuart Field; West Lafayette, IN | T 7–7 | |
| October 9 | Beloit* | Stuart Field; West Lafayette, IN | W 26–0 | |
| October 16 | Wisconsin | Stuart Field; West Lafayette, IN | L 3–28 | |
| October 23 | at Chicago | Stagg Field; Chicago, IL (rivalry) | L 0–7 | |
| November 6 | Iowa | Stuart Field; West Lafayette, IN | W 19–13 | |
| November 13 | at Kentucky* | Stoll Field; Lexington, KY | L 0–7 | |
| November 20 | at Indiana | Jordan Field; Bloomington, IN (Old Oaken Bucket) | W 7–0 | |
*Non-conference game

=== Wisconsin ===
| Date | Opponent | Site | Result | Attendance | Source |
|---|---|---|---|---|---|
| October 2 | Lawrence* | Randall Field; Madison, WI | W 82–0 | | |
| October 8 | Marquette* | Randall Field; Madison, WI | W 85–0 | | |
| October 16 | at Purdue | Stuart Field; West Lafayette, IN | W 28–3 | | |
| October 23 | Ohio State | Randall Field; Madison, WI | W 21–0 | | |
| October 30 | at Chicago | Stagg Field; Chicago, IL | L 13–14 | | |
| November 13 | at Illinois | Illinois Field; Champaign, IL | L 3–17 | 3,788 | |
| November 20 | Minnesota^{†} | Randall Field; Madison, WI (rivalry) | L 3–20 | 13,500 | |
*Non-conference game; ^{†}Homecoming

=== Iowa ===
| Date | Opponent | Site | Result | Attendance | Source |
|---|---|---|---|---|---|
| October 2 | Cornell (IA)* | Iowa Field; Iowa City, IA | W 33–0 | | |
| October 9 | at Morningside* | Sioux City, IA | W 17–6 | | |
| October 16 | Northwestern | Iowa Field; Iowa City, IA | W 9–6 | | |
| October 23 | at Minnesota | Northrop Field; Minneapolis, MN (rivalry) | L 13–51 | 6,000 | |
| November 6 | at Purdue | Stuart Field; West Lafayette, IN | L 13–19 | | |
| November 13 | Iowa State*^{†} | Iowa Field; Iowa City, IA (rivalry) | L 0–16 | | |
| November 20 | Nebraska* | Nebraska Field; Lincoln, NE (rivalry) | L 7–52 | | |
*Non-conference game; ^{†}Homecoming

=== Indiana ===
| Date | Opponent | Site | Result | Attendance | Source |
|---|---|---|---|---|---|
| October 2 | DePauw* | Jordan Field; Bloomington, IN | W 7–0 | | |
| October 9 | Miami (OH)* | Jordan Field; Bloomington, IN | W 41–0 | | |
| October 16 | at Chicago | Stagg Field; Chicago, IL | L 7–13 | > 10,000 | |
| October 30 | vs. Washington and Lee* | Washington Field; Indianapolis, IN | T 7–7 | 8,500 | |
| November 6 | at Ohio State | Ohio Field; Columbus, OH | L 9–10 | | |
| November 13 | at Northwestern | Northwestern Field; Evanston, IL | W 14–6 | | |
| November 20 | Purdue | Jordan Field; Bloomington, IN (rivalry) | L 0–7 | | |
*Non-conference game

=== Northwestern ===
| Date | Opponent | Site | Result | Attendance | Source |
|---|---|---|---|---|---|
| October 2 | Lake Forest | Northwestern Field; Evanston, IL | W 27–6 | | |
| October 9 | Chicago | Northwestern Field; Evanston, IL | L 0–7 | | |
| October 15 | at Iowa | Iowa Field; Iowa City, IA | L 6–9 | | |
| October 23 | at Illinois | Illinois Field; Champaign, IL (rivalry) | L 6–36 | 4,424 | |
| November 6 | Missouri | Northwestern Field; Evanston, IL | W 24–6 | | |
| November 13 | Indiana | Northwestern Field; Evanston, IL | L 6–14 | | |
| November 20 | Ohio State | Northwestern Field; Evanston, IL | L 0–34 | | |

=== Bowl games ===
No Western Conference schools participated in any bowl games during the 1915 season.
