= 1915 Illinois Fighting Illini football team =

American college football season

1915 Illinois Fighting Illini football
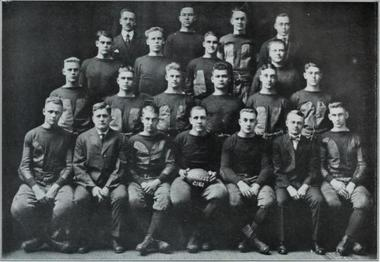

Western Conference co-champion
- Conference: Western Conference
- Record: 5–0–2 (3–0–2 Western)
- Head coach: Robert Zuppke (3rd season)
- Offensive scheme: I formation
- Captain: Jack Watson
- Home stadium: Illinois Field

1915 Western Conference football standings
	Conf.					Overall
Team	W		L		T	W		L		T
Minnesota +	3	–	0	–	1	6	–	0	–	1
Illinois +	3	–	0	–	2	5	–	0	–	2
Chicago	4	–	2	–	0	5	–	2	–	0
Ohio State	2	–	1	–	1	5	–	1	–	1
Purdue	2	–	2	–	0	3	–	3	–	1
Wisconsin	2	–	3	–	0	4	–	3	–	0
Iowa	1	–	2	–	0	3	–	4	–	0
Indiana	1	–	3	–	0	3	–	3	–	1
Northwestern	0	–	5	–	0	2	–	5	–	0
+ – Conference co-champions

The 1915 Illinois Fighting Illini football team was an American football team that represented the University of Illinois during the 1915 college football season. In their third season under head coach Robert Zuppke, the Illini compiled a 5–0–2 record and finished as co-champions of the Western Conference. Center John W. Watson was the team captain.

== Schedule ==
Date	Opponent	Site	Result	Attendance	Source
October 2	Haskell*	Illinois Field; Champaign, IL	W 36–0	3,193	
October 9	Missouri Mines*	Illinois Field; Champaign, IL	W 75–7	2,969	
October 16	at Ohio State	Ohio Field; Columbus, OH (rivalry)	T 3–3	6,634	
October 23	Northwestern	Illinois Field; Champaign, IL	W 36–6	4,424	
October 30	Minnesota^{†}	Illinois Field; Champaign, IL	T 6–6	11,593	
November 13	Wisconsin	Illinois Field; Champaign, IL	W 17–3	3,788	
November 20	at Chicago	Stagg Field; Chicago, IL	W 10–0	24,078	
*Non-conference game; ^{†}Homecoming

== Roster ==
Player	Position
John Wesley Watson (captain)	Center
Amos Lloyd Brennememan	Right end
Reynold Kraft	Right end
Ross Petty	Right tackle
Olay Madsen	Right tackle
Roland A. Cowell	Right tackle
Frank Stewart	Right guard
Phillip Harry Potter	Center
Clarence Applegran	Left guard
Fred R. Hanschman	Left guard
Elmer Rundquist	Left Tackle
Harlan Brown Graham	Left tackle
George Kasson Squier	Left end
Henry W. Markwardt	Left end
George Clark	Quarterback
Frank Pursell	Quarterback
Bart Macomber	Right halfback
Frank Howard Pethybridge	Right halfback
John Ward Nelson	Fullback
Bernard Hallstrom	Fullback
Harold Pogue	Left halfback
David E. Connell	Left halfback

- Head coach: Robert Zuppke (3rd year at Illinois)

== Awards and honors ==
- Bart Macomber, halfback

- Consensus first-team selection on the 1915 College Football All-America Team

- George Squier, end

- Second-team selection by Frank G. Menke for the 1915 All-America team
- Third-team selection by Walter Camp for the 1915 All-America team
