= Chester J. Roberts =

American college sports coach

Biographical details
- Born: c. 1889; Birnamwood, Wisconsin, U.S.
- Died: July 28, 1946 (aged 57); Sunset Beach, California, U.S.

Playing career

Football
- 1909–1911: Lawrence
- Position: Center

Coaching career (HC unless noted)

Football
- 1912: Simpson (assistant)
- 1914: Bethany (WV)
- 1915: Miami (OH)
- 1917: Platteville Normal

Basketball
- 1914–1915: Bethany (WV)
- 1915–1916: Miami (OH)

Head coaching record
- Overall: 11–10 (football); 9–18 (basketball)

Chester Joseph Roberts (c. 1889 – July 28, 1946) was an American college football and college basketball coach in the early 1900s. He was a 1912 graduate of Lawrence College in Appleton, Wisconsin, where he played football. After graduation, he served as a member of the faculty at several colleges in the Midwest. During this time Roberts served as head football coach at Bethany College in Bethany, West Virginia, in 1914, Miami University in Oxford, Ohio, in 1915, and Platteville Normal College—now the University of Wisconsin–Platteville—in 1917, compiling a career college football head coaching record of 11–10. He was also the head basketball coach at Bethany (1914–1915) and Miami (1915–1916), tallying a career college basketball mark of 9–18.

== Early life ==
Roberts was born in Birnamwood, Wisconsin. He attended Lawrence College in Appleton, Wisconsin, from 1908 to 1912 where he earned a Bachelor of Arts degree. He did post graduate work at both University of Wisconsin and the University of Illinois, receiving a master's degree from Wisconsin. In 1913 he married Bessie Bushey of Appleton.

=== Playing career ===
Roberts was an All-State center for two years at Lawrence under coach Mark Catlin. In his last year at Lawrence he was part of the 1911 team that won the State Championship. This team's only loss was to Wisconsin by a score of 15–0. In the rest of the games they outscored their other opponents 100–0. In 1911 Roberts was named to the all-time Lawrence College football team by the local newspaper, the Appleton Evening Crescent.

== Coaching career ==
After graduation from Lawrence, Roberts became an instructor at several colleges including Simpson College, Miami University, Bethany College, and Platteville Normal College. While serving as the member of the faculty at this college he also served as a coach of several sports.

=== Bethany College ===
After spending the 1912–13 academic year as an instructor physics and mathematics as well as an assistant coach at Simpson College, Roberts accepted a job at Bethany College as the Physical Director in 1914. In his only year as football coach he had a record of 3–4. The 1914 football team that Roberts coached lacked experience going into the season. Roberts moved Dougherty to quarterback from end. The team was led by Rogers at running back, who was known for broken field running and passing. He also served as basketball coach for the 1914–15 season where his team went 5–9.

=== Miami University ===
In 1915 Roberts was named an Assistant Professor of Physical Training at Miami University in Oxford, Ohio, for the 1915–16 school year. Included in his duties were coaching the football and basketball team. At the time Miami was changing the philosophy of athletics moving to an all-year athletic coach. The man he replaced as head football coach, James C. Donnelly, took time off from his law practice in Massachusetts showing up in Oxford just for the football season. Roberts served as head coach of the 1915 Miami University football team. Among his players were Earl Blaik, who went on to a College Football Hall of Fame coaching career, Marvin Pierce, father of Barbra Bush and grandfather of George W. Bush, and John E. Hull, who became a four-star general and Vice Chair of the Joint Chiefs of Staff. The team finished with a record of 6–2 and a victory over rival Cincinnati in the last game of the season. The two losses were to Indiana of the Western Conference and Denison, one of Miami biggest rivals at that time. Down 14–0 against Denison, Roberts tried to encourage his team at halftime by offering to buy each player a box of bonbons if they won the game. This offer did not motivate the team; but it did shape Earl Blaik's coaching philosophy. Blaik later wrote about this enticement saying that "...in a Spartan game like football the worst possible inducement to a malingering player is, literally or figuratively, any form of sweetness."

=== Platteville Normal ===
After the 1915–16 academic year Roberts moved from Miami to Platteville Normal College—now known as the University of Wisconsin–Platteville—in Platteville, Wisconsin, to teach physical culture. While at Platteville Normal he also coached the football team to a 2–4 record for the 1917 season.

== After coaching ==
After his coaching career, Roberts was employed by several companies in the paper and automobile industries in Wisconsin including Tuttle Press Co. in Appleton, Northern Paper Mills of Green Bay, Wisconsin, A. O. Smith of Milwaukee, and Nash Motors of Milwaukee. While at the Northern Paper Mills he received a patent for Core-tube cutter. In 1927, he was appointed manager of the industrial division of the Milwaukee Chamber of Commerce, where he was in charge of maintaining existing manufacturers and recruiting new manufactures to Milwaukee. Roberts moved to California in 1940 and was associated there with the Lockheed Corporation. He died at the age of 57, on July 28, 1946, of a heart attack while visiting a friend in Sunset Beach, California.

== Head coaching record ==
=== Football ===
Year	Team	Overall	Conference	Standing	Bowl/playoffs
Bethany Bison (Independent) (1914)
1914	Bethany	3–4			
Bethany:		3–4			
Miami Redskins (Ohio Athletic Conference) (1915)
1915	Miami	6–2	5–1	2nd	
Miami:		6–2	5–1		
Platteville Normal Pioneers (Inter-Normal Athletic Conference of Wisconsin) (1917)
1917	Platteville Normal	2–4	2–2	T–5th	
Platteville Normal:		2–4	2–2		
Total:		11–10			
