= George Little (American football coach) =

American football player, sports coach, and administrator (1889–1957)

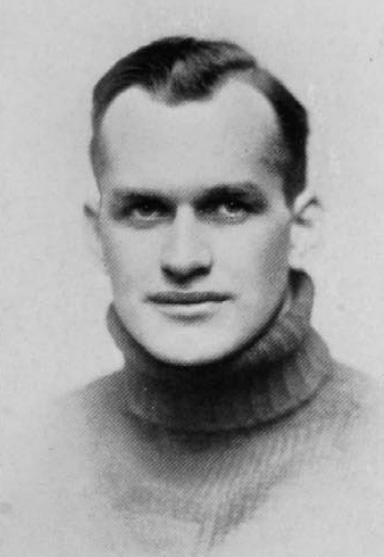
- Little pictured in The Cincinnatian 1915, Cincinnati yearbook

Biographical details
- Born: May 27, 1889; Washington, D.C., U.S.
- Died: February 23, 1957 (aged 67); New Brunswick, New Jersey, U.S.

Playing career

Football
- 1909–1911: Ohio Wesleyan
- Position: Guard

Coaching career (HC unless noted)

Football
- 1914–1915: Cincinnati
- 1916: Miami (OH)
- 1919–1921: Miami (OH)
- 1922–1923: Michigan (assistant)
- 1924: Michigan
- 1925–1926: Wisconsin

Basketball
- 1914–1916: Cincinnati
- 1916–1917: Miami (OH)
- 1919–1922: Miami (OH)

Baseball
- 1920: Miami (OH)

Administrative career (AD unless noted)
- 1921: Miami (OH)
- 1922–?: Michigan (assistant AD)
- 1925–1932: Wisconsin
- 1932–1953: Rutgers

Head coaching record
- Overall: 54–16–4 (football); 47–38 (basketball); 3–8 (baseball)

Accomplishments and honors

Championships
- Football; 2 OAC (1916, 1921)
- College Football Hall of Fame; Inducted in 1955 (profile)

George Edkin Little (May 27, 1889 – February 23, 1957) was an American football player, and coach of football, basketball, and baseball, and college athletics administrator.

Little attended Ohio Wesleyan University from which he graduated in 1912. He served as the head football coach at the University of Cincinnati (1914–1915), Miami University (1916, 1919–1921), the University of Michigan (1924), and the University of Wisconsin–Madison (1925–1926), compiling a career college football record of 54–16–4. Little was also the head basketball coach at Cincinnati (1914–1916) and Miami (1916–1917, 1919–1922), tallying a career college basketball mark of 47–38.

In addition to coaching, Little served as the athletic director at Wisconsin (1925–1932) and Rutgers University (1932–1953) and as the executive secretary of the National Football Foundation and College Football Hall of Fame. He was inducted into the College Football Hall of Fame as a coach in 1955.

== Early years ==
Little was born in May 1889 in Washington, D.C. His father, George Little, was a Pennsylvania native and a school teacher. His mother, Marion Little, was also a Pennsylvania native. He had a younger brother, Howard Little (born July 1890), and a younger sister, Elizabeth Little (born February 1897). At the time of the 1900 United States census, the family was living in Wolf Township, Lycoming County, Pennsylvania.

== Ohio Wesleyan ==
Little attended Ohio Wesleyan University in Delaware, Ohio, receiving a Bachelor of Science degree in 1912. He played as a guard on the Ohio Wesleyan football teams of 1909, 1910, and 1911. He also received three letters for his participation on the track team, and was president of the student body and student senate. The 1911 Ohio Wesleyan football team compiled a 6–3 record, held its opponents scoreless in all six victories, and narrowly lost to Ohio State by a 3–0 score. The 1912 Ohio Wesleyan yearbook, Le Bijou, said the following of Little:

Prexy" Little has won distinction as an athlete and a politician. For years he has guarded Wesleyan's interests on the gridiron, but has not limited his loyalty to that enterprise. We do not know what political intrigue made him President of the Student Body, but we know he has filled his office acceptably. He is a fellow of the fellows – not of any group, but of all the students. We respect him for his integrity, his sincerity, and his ability.

== Coaching and administrative career ==
=== Ohio State ===
After graduating from Wesleyan, Little attended Ohio State University as an agriculture student. While there, he also served as an assistant coach for the 1912 and 1913 Ohio State Buckeyes football teams. He was "given credit for lending much help" to John Wilce in leading the 1912 Ohio State team to an Ohio Athletic Conference championship. The success of the 1912 team led to Ohio State's admission to the Big Ten Conference for the 1913 season.

=== Cincinnati ===
In January 1914, Little was hired as the head football coach at University of Cincinnati. During the 1914 season, Little led Cincinnati to a 6–3 record, as his team shut out five opponents and outscored all opponents, 164 to 44. In 1915, his team compiled a 4–5 record and was outscored, 158 to 110.

=== Miami ===
In January 1916, Little was hired as the head football coach at Miami University in Oxford, Ohio, succeeding Chester J. Roberts. During the 1916 season, Little led Miami to a 7–0–1 record and an Ohio Athletic Conference championship. This team shut out six of eight opponents and outscored all opponents by a combined total of 238 to 12. The only blemish on the record of the 1916 team as a scoreless tie with Denison.

Little's tenure was interrupted by his service in the armed forces during World War I. He served as a captain in the infantry from August 15, 1917, to August 7, 1918.

He returned and led the Redskins a 7–1 record in 1919 and a 5–2–1 record in 1920. He once again won the Ohio Athletic Conference championship in 1921 with a perfect 8–0 record. The 1921 team scored 238 points during the season and gave up only 13. In his four years as Miami's head coach, Little compiled a record of 27–3–2 including 21 games where the opponent did not score. He left Miami to become Fielding H. Yost's top assistant at the University of Michigan.

=== Michigan ===
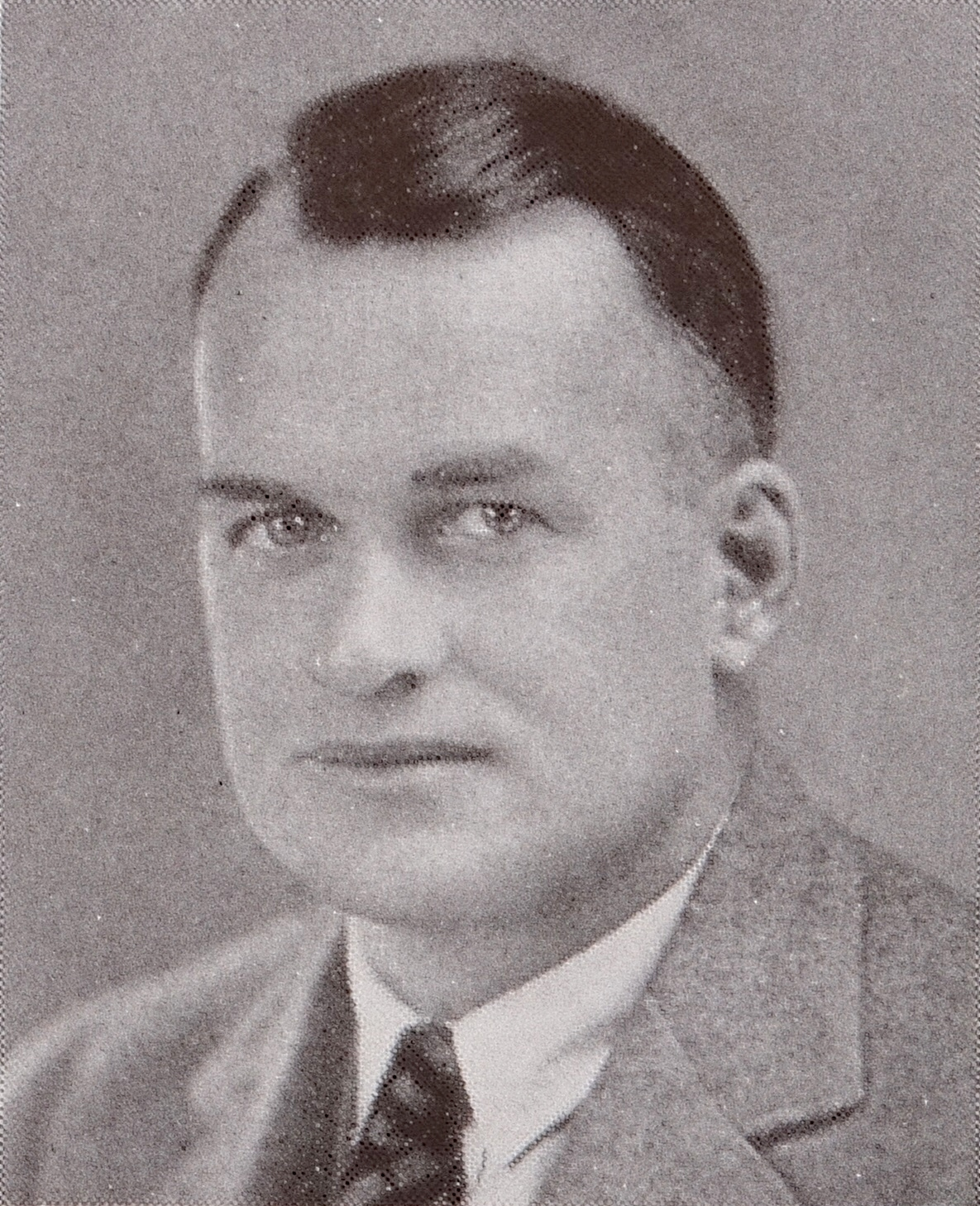
Little from the 1925 Michiganensian

In May 1922, Little was hired by the University of Michigan as assistant athletic director and assistant football coach. Little was the top assistant under Fielding H. Yost for the 1922 and 1923 seasons before being named head coach for the 1924 season. That year, he compiled a record of 6–2. Little and the Wolverines shut out their opponents in five of the six victories.

=== Wisconsin ===
In January 1925, Little accepted an offer from the University of Wisconsin to become its athletic director. He also served as the head coach of the Wisconsin Badgers football team during the 1925 and 1926 seasons, compiling records of 6–1–1 in 1925 and 5–2–1 in 1926. His 1925 team finished in second place in the Big Ten Conference with its only loss being against his former team, Michigan, by a score of 21–0. The Wolverines were led by Yost, who had returned to the head coaching position.

In January 1927, Little stepped down as head coach of the Wisconsin football team to devote his full efforts to his position as the school's athletic director. His accomplishments as athletic director include the construction of the Wisconsin Field House in 1930. In December 1931, Little tendered his resignation as Wisconsin's athletic director, effective at the end of the academic year.

=== Rutgers ===
In February 1932, Little resigned as Wisconsin's athletic director to accept a position as director of physical education at Rutgers University in New Brunswick, New Jersey, effective in April 1932. In that position, Little had control over intercollegiate and intramural sports as well as required and advanced physical education. He continued to be athletic director at Rutgers for more than 20 years. During his tenure at Rutgers, his accomplishments included the 1938 hiring of head football coach Harvey Harman, later inducted into the College Football Hall of Fame. He was also "instrumental" in the construction of Rugers Stadium, using funding from the Works Progress Administration. The 1938 dedication game resulted in the first Rutgers victory over Princeton since the first college football game in 1869. The stadium served as the home field for the Rutgers Scarlet Knights football team from 1938 to 1992.

In January 1952, Little was appointed as the executive director of the National Football Foundation and the National Football Hall of Fame (later renamed the College Football Hall of Fame) located on the Rutgers campus. He took a leave of absence from his position as Rutgers' athletic director and became seriously ill for several months during 1952.

In December 1953, Little formally stepped down as Rutgers' athletic director and assumed a new position as special assistant to the university president. He also continued in his post as executive secretary of the National Football Hall of Fame.

== Later years and honors ==
Little continued to serve as executive secretary of the National Football Foundation and Hall of Fame until his death in 1957. In July 1955, Little was one of five coaches (along with Bernie Bierman, Wallace Wade, Matty Bell, and Eddie N. Robinson) inducted into the College Football Hall of Fame. He was inducted as a coach but also "due to his work in organizing the Hall of Fame and serving as executive secretary."

In February 1957, Little died at age 67 from uremia at Middlesex General Hospital in New Brunswick, New Jersey. Little's funeral service was held at Kirkpatrick Chapel on Rutgers campus; he was buried at Picture Rocks, Pennsylvania.

Since his death, several posthumous honors have been bestowed on Little, including the following:

- On November 2, 1957, Rutgers held a ceremony honoring Little at halftime of Rutgers' Hall of Fame football game. A bronze plaque was installed at the entrance to Rutgers Stadium's west stands stating: "This tablet is placed in memory of George Edkin Little, 1889-1957, Director of Athletics, 1932-1953, whose imprint upon the physical facilities of Rutgers athletics was matched only by his impact upon the lives of the young men whom he coached and taught."
- In 1964, Little was inducted into the Ohio Wesleyan Athletics Hall of Fame.
- In 1965, Rutgers established the George E. Little Memorial Award along with a trophy in the form of winged victory. The award was awarded to the Rutgers team that achieved national recognition for outstanding achievement or to an athlete who won a national championship.
- In 1976, Little was inducted into the National Association of Collegiate Directors of Athletics Hall of Fame.
- In 1988, Little was one of the inaugural inductees into the Rutgers Athletic Hall of Fame. He was hailed at the time as "the father of Rutgers Stadium."

== Head coaching record ==
=== Football ===
Year	Team	Overall	Conference	Standing	Bowl/playoffs
Cincinnati Bearcats (Ohio Athletic Conference) (1914–1915)
1914	Cincinnati	6–3	3–2	T–3rd	
1915	Cincinnati	4–5	3–3	T–7th	
Cincinnati:		10–8	7–5		
Miami Redskins (Ohio Athletic Conference) (1916)
1916	Miami	7–0–1	6–0–1	1st	
Miami Redskins (Ohio Athletic Conference) (1919–1921)
1919	Miami	7–1	7–1	4th	
1920	Miami	5–2–1	3–2–1	8th	
1921	Miami	8–0	7–0	1st	
Miami:		27–3–2	23–3–2		
Michigan Wolverines (Big Ten Conference) (1924)
1924	Michigan	6–2	4–2	4th	
Michigan:		6–2	4–2		
Wisconsin Badgers (Big Ten Conference) (1925–1926)
1925	Wisconsin	6–1–1	3–1–1	2nd	
1926	Wisconsin	5–2–1	3–2–1	5th	
Wisconsin:		11–3–2	6–3–2		
Total:		54–16–4			
National championship Conference title Conference division title or championship game berth

== See also ==
- List of college football head coaches with non-consecutive tenure
