= 1915 Wisconsin Badgers football team =

American college football season

1915 Wisconsin Badgers football
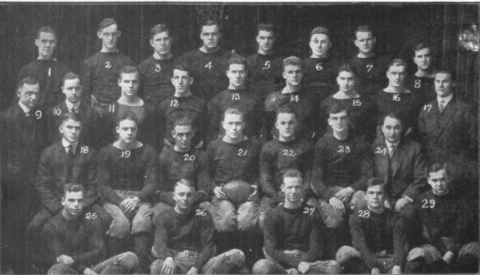
- Conference: Western Conference
- Record: 4–3 (2–3 Western)
- Head coach: William Juneau (4th season)
- Captain: Cub Buck
- Home stadium: Randall Field

1915 Western Conference football standings
	Conf.					Overall
Team	W		L		T	W		L		T
Minnesota +	3	–	0	–	1	6	–	0	–	1
Illinois +	3	–	0	–	2	5	–	0	–	2
Chicago	4	–	2	–	0	5	–	2	–	0
Ohio State	2	–	1	–	1	5	–	1	–	1
Purdue	2	–	2	–	0	3	–	3	–	1
Wisconsin	2	–	3	–	0	4	–	3	–	0
Iowa	1	–	2	–	0	3	–	4	–	0
Indiana	1	–	3	–	0	3	–	3	–	1
Northwestern	0	–	5	–	0	2	–	5	–	0
+ – Conference co-champions

The 1915 Wisconsin Badgers football team represented the University of Wisconsin as a member of the Western Conference during the 1915 college football season. Led by William Juneau in his fourth and final season as head coach, the Badgers compiled an overall record of 4–3 with a mark of 2–3 in conference play, placing sixth place in the Western Conference. Cub Buck was the team's captain and a consensus pick for the 1915 College Football All-America Team.

== Schedule ==
Date	Opponent	Site	Result	Attendance	Source
October 2	Lawrence*	Randall Field; Madison, WI	W 82–0		
October 8	Marquette*	Randall Field; Madison, WI	W 85–0		
October 16	at Purdue	Stuart Field; West Lafayette, IN	W 28–3		
October 23	Ohio State	Randall Field; Madison, WI	W 21–0		
October 30	at Chicago	Stagg Field; Chicago, IL	L 13–14		
November 13	at Illinois	Illinois Field; Champaign, IL	L 3–17	3,788	
November 20	Minnesota^{†}	Randall Field; Madison, WI (rivalry)	L 3–20	13,500	
*Non-conference game; ^{†}Homecoming
