= 1915 All-Western college football team =

American all-star college football team

The 1915 All-Western college football team consists of American football players selected to the All-Western teams chosen by various selectors for the 1915 college football season.

== All-Western selections ==
=== Ends ===
- Bert Baston, Minnesota (Ax-1; ECP-1; S; WE-1) (CFHOF)
- Guy Chamberlin, Nebraska (Ax-1; ECP-2, FM-1; S) (CFHOF/PFHOF)
- George K. Squier, Illinois (Ax-2; ECP-1, DJ, FM-1; WE-1)
- Albert J. Quist, Minnesota (Ax-2; ECP-2; WE-2)
- Blake Miller, Michigan State (DJ)
- Carl Brelos, Chicago (WE-2)

=== Tackles ===
- Cub Buck, Wisconsin (Ax-1; ECP-1, DJ [as guard], FM-1; S; WE-1)
- Laurens Shull, Chicago (Ax-1; ECP-2, DJ, FM-1; WE-1)
- Elmer T. Rundquist, Illinois (ECP-1)
- Ross Petty, Illinois (ECP-2)
- Vic Halligan, Nebraska (DJ)
- Gideon Smith, Michigan Agricultural (S)
- Ivan B. Boughton, Ohio State (Ax-2; WE-2)
- Robert H. Randolph, Northwestern (Ax-2; WE-2)

=== Guards ===
- Merton Dunnigan, Minnesota (Ax-1; ECP-1; FM-1; WE-1)
- Freeman Fitzgerald, Notre Dame (Ax-2; FM-1; S)
- Frank Blocker, Purdue (Ax-1; ECP-1; WE-1)
- Fred R. Hanschmann, Illinois (ECP-2)
- Gilbert S. Sinclair, Minnesota (ECP-2)
- William D. Cochran, Michigan (DJ)
- Earl Abbott, Nebraska (Ax-2; S)
- Austin Stromberg, Northwestern (WE-2)
- Irving J. Barron, Iowa (WE-2)

=== Centers ===
- Jack Watson, Illinois (Ax-1; ECP-1; DJ; FM-1; S; WE-1)
- H. F. Hanson, Minnesota (ECP-2; FM-2; WE-2)
- Lyman Frimodig, Michigan Agr. (FM-3)
- Fisher, Chicago (Ax-2)

=== Quarterbacks ===
- Pete Russell, Chicago (Ax-1; ECP-1, DJ [as hb], FM-1; S; WE-1)
- George Clark, Illinois (ECP-2; DJ; FM-2; WE-2)
- C. I. "Shorty" Long, Minnesota (FM-3)
- Frank B. Whitaker, Indiana (Ax-2)

=== Halfbacks ===
- Bart Macomber, Illinois (Ax-2; ECP-1; FM-3; S; WE-1) (CFHOF)
- John Maulbetsch, Michigan (Ax-2; ECP-1, FM-3 [as fb]; S) (CFHOF)
- Dick Rutherford, Nebraska (Ax-1; FM-1)
- Neno DaPrato, Michigan Agr. (FM-1)
- Paddy Driscoll, Northwestern (Ax-1)
- Eber Simpson, Wisconsin (ECP-2)
- Dow Byers, Wisconsin (ECP-2, FM-2; WE-1)
- Stan Cofall, Notre Dame (FM-2)
- James Ballentine, Minnesota (WE-2)
- Harold A. Winters, Ohio State (FM-3)

=== Fullbacks ===
- Bernie Bierman, Minnesota (Ax-1; ECP-1, DJ [as hb], FM-1; S; WE-1) (CFHOF)
- Pudge Wyman, Minnesota (ECP-2)
- Harold Pogue, Illinois (DJ; WE-2)
- Charlie Bachman, Notre Dame (Ax-2) (CFHOF)
- Patterson, Northwestern (WE-2)

== Key ==
Bold = consensus choice by a majority of the selectors

Ax = G. W. Axelson of the Chicago Herald

ECP = E. C. Patterson in Collier's Weekly

DJ = Dick Jemison in the Atlanta Constitution.

FM = Frank G. Menke of the International News Service

S = Sullivan in The News of Chicago

WE = Walter Eckersall of the Chicago Tribune

CFHOF = College Football Hall of Fame

Bold = Consensus first-team selection by at least three of the selectors listed

== See also ==
- 1915 College Football All-America Team
