= Fred Sefton =

Biographical details
- Born: August 7, 1888; Holyoke, Massachusetts, U.S.
- Died: March 11, 1976 (aged 87); Akron, Ohio, U.S.

Playing career

Football
- 1913: Colgate

Coaching career (HC unless noted)

Football
- 1915–1923: Akron

Basketball
- 1916–1924: Akron
- 1925–1927: Akron

Baseball
- 1916–1924: Akron
- 1927–1930: Akron

Administrative career (AD unless noted)
- ?–1946: Akron

Head coaching record
- Overall: 33–34–4 (football); 103–42 (basketball)

Accomplishments and honors

Championships
- Basketball; 2 OAC (1919–1920)

Frederick Stanley Sefton (August 7, 1888 – March 11, 1976) was an American college football, college basketball, and college baseball coach and athletics administrator. He served as the head football coach at the University of Akron for nine seasons, from 1915 to 1923, compiling a record of 33–34–4. Sefton also coached the men's basketball team at Akron for a total of 11 seasons, nine from 1916 to 1924 and two more from 1925 to 1927, tallying a total mark of 103–42. He played college football at Colgate University.

Sefton died on March 11, 1976, at Akron General Medical Center in Akron, Ohio.

== Head coaching record ==
=== Football ===
Year	Team	Overall	Conference	Standing	Bowl/playoffs
Akron (Ohio Athletic Conference) (1915–1923)
1915	Akron	1–7–1	1–6	T–10th	
1916	Akron	2–7	2–4	9th	
1917	Akron	5–3	3–1	5th	
1918	Akron	2–2–1	1–2–1	10th	
1919	Akron	6–1–1	5–1–1	6th	
1920	Akron	4–4	2–4	12th	
1921	Akron	5–3	4–3	T–7th	
1922	Akron	5–3	5–3	8th	
1923	Akron	4–3–1	2–3–1	13th	
Akron:		33–34–4			
Total:		33–34–4			

=== Basketball ===
Record table
Season	Team	Overall	Conference	Standing	Postseason
Akron (Independent) (1915–1918)
1915–16	Akron	5–5			
1916–17	Akron	14–2			
1917–18	Akron	9–4			
Akron (Ohio Athletic Conference) (1918–1924)
1918–19	Akron	14–0		1st	
1919–20	Akron	12–2		1st	
1920–21	Akron	11–2			
1921–22	Akron	5–8			
1922–23	Akron	12–1			
1923–24	Akron	10–3	9–3	T–6th	
Akron (Ohio Athletic Conference) (1925–1927)
1925–26	Akron	6–7	6–4	6th	
1926–27	Akron	5–8	4–8	7th	
Akron:		103–42			
Total:		103–42			
National champion Postseason invitational champion Conference regular season champion Conference regular season and conference tournament champion Division regular season champion Division regular season and conference tournament champion Conference tournament champion
