= 1915 University of Akron football team =

American college football season

1915 Akron football
- Conference: Ohio Athletic Conference
- Record: 1–7–1 (1–6 OAC)
- Head coach: Fred Sefton (1st season)
- Captain: Harold Sours
- Home stadium: Buchtel Field

1915 Ohio Athletic Conference football standings
| | Conf. | | | | | Overall |
| Team | W | | L | | T | W | | L | | T |
|---|---|---|---|---|---|---|---|---|---|---|
| Western Reserve $ | 6 | – | 1 | – | 0 | 7 | – | 2 | – | 0 |
| Miami (OH) | 5 | – | 1 | – | 0 | 6 | – | 2 | – | 0 |
| Denison | 5 | – | 2 | – | 0 | 6 | – | 2 | – | 0 |
| Ohio | 2 | – | 1 | – | 0 | 8 | – | 1 | – | 0 |
| Wooster | 3 | – | 1 | – | 2 | 3 | – | 3 | – | 2 |
| Case | 4 | – | 2 | – | 1 | 5 | – | 5 | – | 1 |
| Oberlin | 3 | – | 3 | – | 0 | 4 | – | 4 | – | 0 |
| Cincinnati | 3 | – | 4 | – | 0 | 5 | – | 4 | – | 0 |
| Ohio Wesleyan | 3 | – | 3 | – | 0 | 4 | – | 5 | – | 0 |
| Kenyon | 1 | – | 6 | – | 0 | 3 | – | 6 | – | 0 |
| Akron | 1 | – | 6 | – | 0 | 1 | – | 7 | – | 1 |
| Wittenberg | 0 | – | 4 | – | 1 | 3 | – | 5 | – | 1 |
| Mount Union | 0 | – | 5 | – | 0 | 3 | – | 7 | – | 0 |
| Baldwin–Wallace | 0 | – | 0 | – | 0 | 0 | – | 0 | – | 0 |
| Ohio State * | 3 | – | 0 | – | 0 | 5 | – | 1 | – | 1 |
$ – Conference champion; * – did not complete for championship

The 1915 Akron football team represented the University of Akron, formerly Buchtel College, in the 1915 college football season. The team was led by head coach Fred Sefton, in his first season. Akron was outscored by their opponents by a total of 20–239. This season was the team's first as part of a conference, the Ohio Athletic Conference.

== Schedule ==
| Date | Opponent | Site | Result |
|---|---|---|---|
| September 25 | Case | Buchtel Field; Akron, OH | L 0–26 |
| October 2 | Miami (OH) | Buchtel Field; Akron, OH | L 6–23 |
| October 9 | Allegheny* | Buchtel Field; Akron, OH | L 0–10 |
| October 16 | Oberlin | Buchtel Field; Akron, OH | L 0–42 |
| October 23 | Western Reserve | Buchtel Field; Akron, OH | L 0–53 |
| October 30 | Wooster | Buchtel Field; Akron, OH | L 7–20 |
| November 6 | Ohio Northern* | Buchtel Field; Akron, OH | T 0–0 |
| November 13 | Denison | Granville, OH | L 0–66 |
| November 25 | Kenyon | Buchtel Field; Akron, OH | W 7–0 |
*Non-conference game
