= Fred Heyman =

American football player and coach

Playing career

Football
- 1912–1915: Washington & Jefferson
- 1916: Massillon Tigers
- Position: End

Coaching career (HC unless noted)

Football
- 1916: Bethany (WV)

Baseball
- 1917: Bethany (WV)

Head coaching record
- Overall: 2–7 (football)

Accomplishments and honors

Awards
- Third-team All-American (1915)

Fred G. Heyman was an American football player and coach. He served as the head football coach at Bethany College in Bethany, West Virginia in 1916. Heyman played college football at Washington & Jefferson College.

== Head coaching record ==
=== Football ===
Year	Team	Overall	Conference	Standing	Bowl/playoffs
Bethany Bison (Independent) (1916)
1916	Bethany	2–7			
Bethany:		2–7			
Total:		2–7			
