= Clarence Childs =

American athlete (1883–1960)

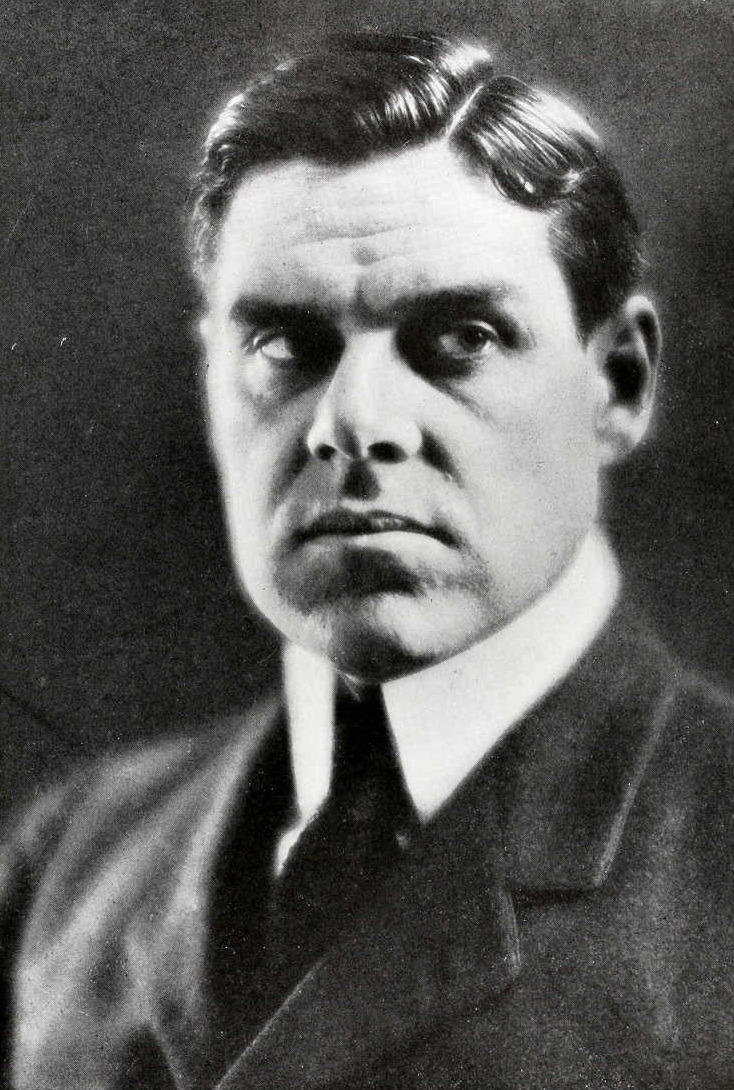
- Childs from The Arbutus 1916

Biographical details
- Born: July 24, 1883; Wooster, Ohio, U.S.
- Died: September 16, 1960 (aged 77); Washington, D.C., U.S.

Playing career
- 1910: Yale
- Position: Guard

Coaching career (HC unless noted)
- 1913: Wooster
- 1914–1915: Indiana

Administrative career (AD unless noted)
- 1914–1915: Indiana

Head coaching record
- Overall: 8–10–3

Clarence Childs
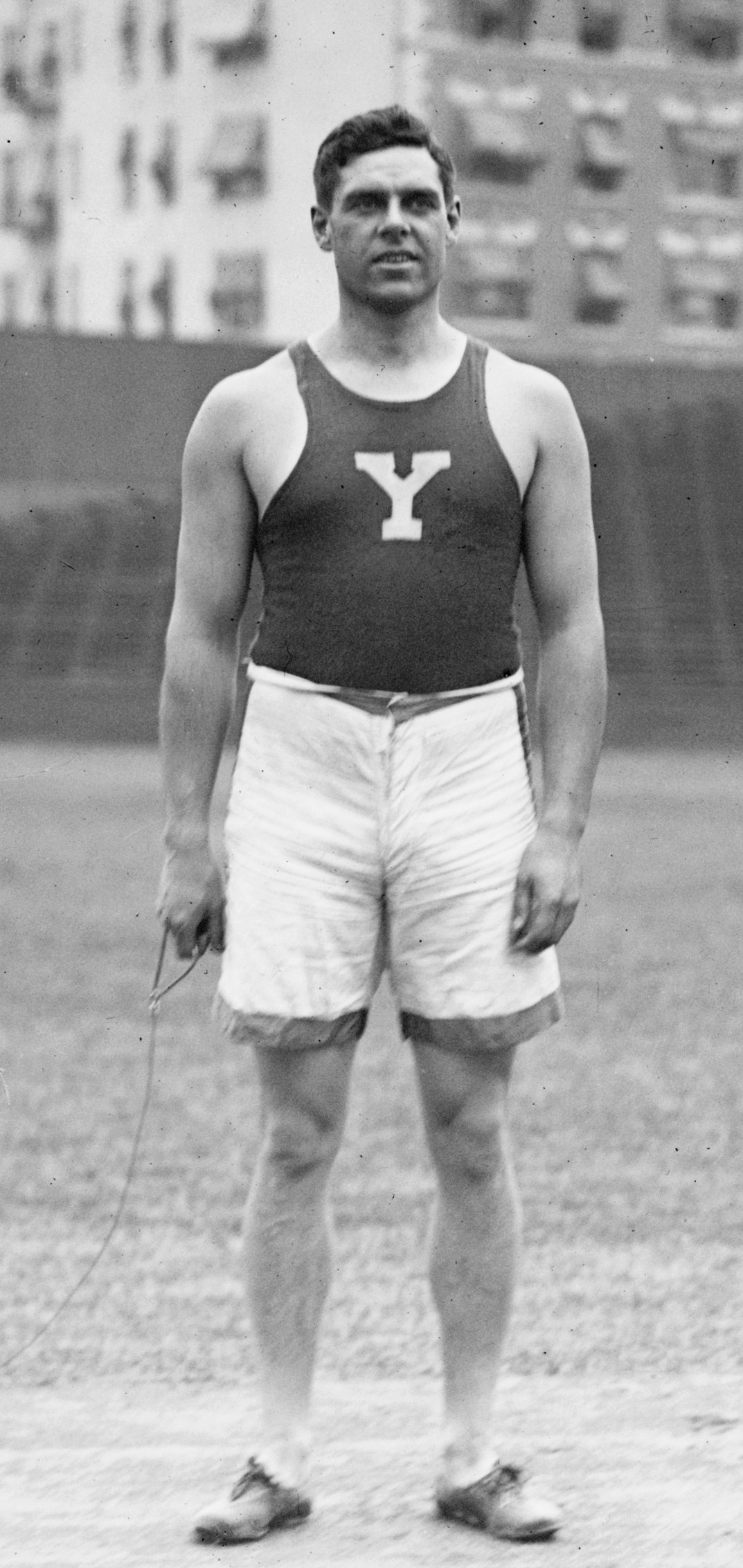

Personal information
- Height: 1.83 m (6 ft 0 in)
- Weight: 102 kg (225 lb)

Sport
- Sport: Athletics
- Event: Hammer throw
- Club: NYAC, New York

Achievements and titles
- Personal best: 52.53 m (1912)
Medal record
Representing the United States
Olympic Games
Bronze medal – third place	1912 Stockholm	Hammer throw

Clarence Chester Childs (July 24, 1883 – September 16, 1960) was an American athlete who competed mainly in the hammer throw. He represented the United States at the 1912 Summer Olympics in Stockholm, winning a bronze medal in the hammer throw. Childs served as the head football coach at Indiana University from 1914 to 1915, compiling a record of 6–7–1.

== Biography ==
He was born on July 24, 1883, in Wooster, Ohio. He lived in Fremont, Ohio for much of his youth, where he played football for the Fremont Football Club. He became Captain of the Yale track team before he competed for the United States in the 1912 Summer Olympics held in Stockholm, Sweden in the hammer throw, where he won the bronze medal. Childs was the football coach at Indiana University and served in France during World War I. Childs was appointed by President Warren Harding to a position within the U.S. Treasury Department but was fired when he attacked a United States Secret Service agent, who was following him on suspicion that Childs had illegally removed sensitive documents. He died in Washington, D.C., on September 16, 1960.

== Head coaching record ==
=== Football ===
Year	Team	Overall	Conference	Standing	Bowl/playoffs
Wooster Presbyterians (Ohio Athletic Conference) (1913)
1913	Wooster	2–3–2	1–3–1	T–8th	
Wooster:		2–3–2	1–3–1		
Indiana Hoosiers (Big Ten Conference) (1914–1915)
1914	Indiana	3–4	1–4	8th	
1915	Indiana	3–3–1	1–3	8th	
Indiana:		6–7–1	2–7		
Total:		8–10–3			
