= Laurens Shull =

American football player (1894–1918)

Chicago Maroons
- Position: Tackle

Personal information
- Born: January 17, 1894; Sioux City, Iowa, U.S.
- Died: August 5, 1918 (aged 24); Neuilly, Paris, France

Career information
- College: Chicago (1914–1915)

Awards and highlights
- First-team All-Western (1915)

Laurens Corning "Spike" Shull (January 17, 1894 – August 5, 1918) was an All-American football player who was killed in action during World War I. He played football, baseball and basketball for the University of Chicago from 1913 to 1916. He died of wounds suffered at the Battle of Château-Thierry in July 1918.

== Early life ==
Shull was born in Sioux City, Iowa, the son of a prominent Iowa attorney, Deloss C. Shull. He graduated with honors from Sioux City High School in 1912 where he was captain of the football, basketball and baseball teams.

== University of Chicago ==
After graduating high school, Shull enrolled at the University of Chicago where he won three varsity letters in each of three sports – football, basketball and baseball. He was selected as a first-team All-Western player and a second-team All-American in 1915. In announcing Shull's selection for the 1915 All-Western team, Walter Eckersall wrote:

Shull of Chicago is placed at right tackle because of consistent playing. He was the main cog in the Maroon forward wall and seldom allowed substantial gains to be made through him. He generally mixed in every play, varied his charges and was always down the field under kicks. The Maroon followed the ball with rare cunning and has had enough experience to hold his own with any lineman in the West.

Shull was also captain of the Chicago Maroons baseball team in 1916 and a member of the Alpha Delta Phi fraternity, the Three Quarters Club, the Skull and Crescent, the Order of the Iron Mask, the Owl and Serpent and in his last year was selected a university marshal. He was also president of the Young Men's Christian Association during his junior year and was a delegate to a YMCA conference of student leaders at Ithaca, New York.

== Business career ==
After graduating from Chicago, Shull became employed as a bank vice president at the Farmer's Bank in Woodward, Iowa. During his time in Woodward, Shull coached the high school football team and served as a referee for football and basketball games throughout the state of Iowa. He also became affiliated with the Independent Order of Odd Fellows, Ancient Free and Accepted Masons and Benevolent and Protective Order of Elks.

== Service and death in World War I ==
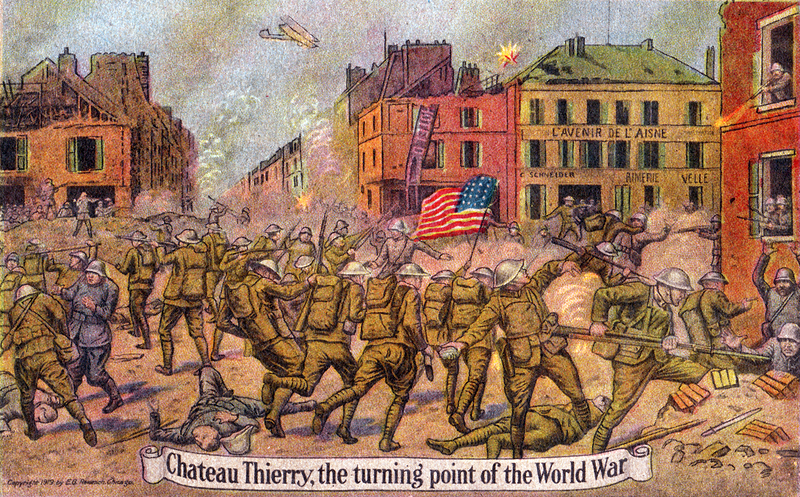
Shull died of wounds suffered at the Battle of Château-Thierry.

In May 1917, after the entry of the United States into World War I, Shull entered the U.S. Army officer training camp at Fort Snelling. In August 1917, he was commissioned as a second lieutenant in the infantry. He sailed for Liverpool, England on September 7, 1917, and was dispatched to France and was assigned to a Scottish regiment for training in trench warfare. In December 1917, he became an officer in the 26th Infantry, Company F (later transferred to Co.G), First Division. Shull and his men engaged in raids in no man's land. He was deployed to Flanders where he was part of 15 engagements and was slightly injured in a German gas attack. On July 18, 1918, Shull was fatally wounded at the Battle of Château-Thierry. Three weeks later, he died at American Red Cross Hospital No. 1 at Neuilly a suburb of Paris, of complications due to bullet wounds. Shull was awarded the Distinguished Service Cross for his action in leading his men against a German machine-gun nest on the day he suffered the wounds from which he died.

== Tributes and memorials ==
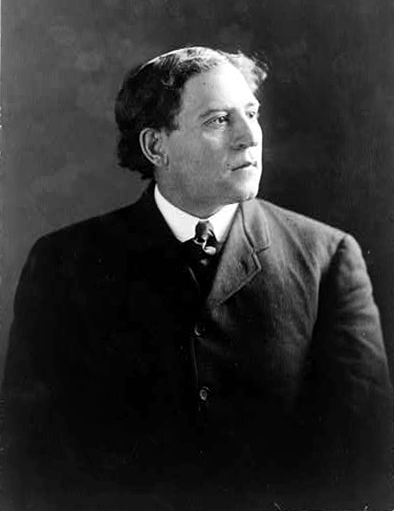
University of Chicago football coach Amos Alonzo Stagg wrote to Shull's parents on learning of Shull's death.

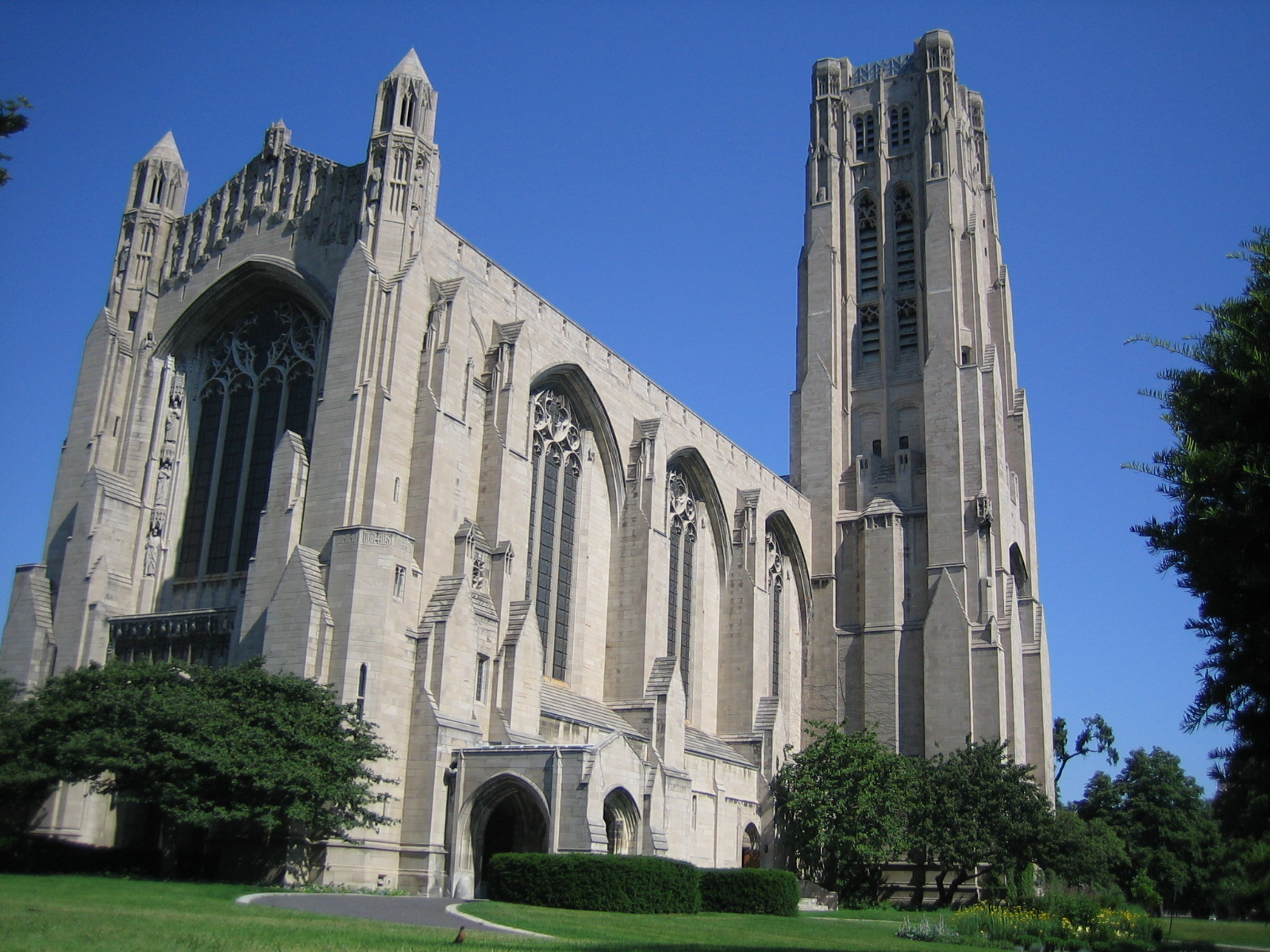
Shull's image in his doughboy uniform was sculpted into the Rockefeller Chapel at the University of Chicago.

After learning of Shull's death, Chicago's famed football coach Amos Alonzo Stagg wrote a letter to Shull's parents:

The last time I saw him was when the big handsome boy appeared in my office and asked for a recommendation to an Officers Training Camp. He told me that he wanted to get into the Fort Sheridan Camp where so many of his friends would be, and in his droll way (referring the draft) said, 'Mr. Stagg, they'd get me the first thing, I'm so big. So I'm going to fool them and enlist.' From his talk I gathered that 'Spike' did not look upon his enlistment in the boyish spirit of adventure but as a duty. He gave me the impression that he felt that there was no sufficient reason why he should not go and he was going to offer his services freely. During the three years I was his coach in football, I got a good insight into his nature and character and I grew to appreciate and to admire and to love him. 'Spike' had an unusually true and honest soul with a serious-mindedness to duty which does not come to many people until well along in middle life. … 'Spike's' life at the University was clean, sincere, manly and brave. He was universally respected and loved by many. Speaking of him as I knew him, I have said several times that I did not know any young man more fit to appear before his Maker. His life has been beautifully true and his death has been supremely noble.

Shull's body was initially buried in the American cemetery at Suresnes, France, but his remains were returned to Sioux City in 1921 and buried in a ceremony attended by 1,000 former soldiers. The Sioux City post of the Veterans of Foreign Wars and the Woodward, Iowa post of the American Legion were both named in Shull's honor after the war. Shull was further honored in 1924 with one of the memorial columns at the new Memorial Stadium on the University of Illinois campus at Urbana, Illinois; he was one of two individuals who was not a University of Illinois student to be honored by a memorial at the new stadium. His image wearing a doughboy uniform is also carved into the exterior of Chicago's Rockefeller Chapel completed in 1928.

== See also ==
- 1915 College Football All-America Team
