= Guy Chamberlin =

American football player and coach (1894–1967)

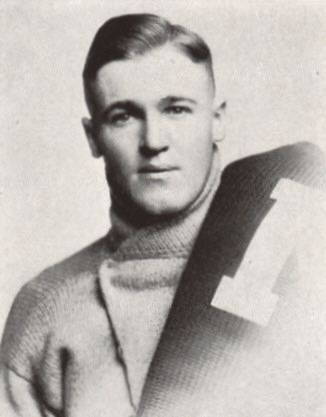

No. 22, 2, 13
- Position: End

Personal information
- Born: January 16, 1894; Blue Springs, Nebraska, U.S.
- Died: April 4, 1967 (aged 73); Lincoln, Nebraska, U.S.
- Listed height: 6 ft 2 in (1.88 m)
- Listed weight: 196 lb (89 kg)

Career information
- High school: Blue Springs (NE)
- College: Nebraska

Career history

Playing
- Canton Bulldogs (1919); Decatur / Chicago Staleys (1920–1921); Canton Bulldogs (1922–1923); Cleveland Bulldogs (1924); Frankford Yellow Jackets (1925–1926); Chicago Cardinals (1927)

Coaching
- Canton Bulldogs (1922–1923); Cleveland Bulldogs (1924); Frankford Yellow Jackets (1925–1926); Chicago Cardinals (1927)

Awards and highlights
- Ohio League champion (1919); 5× NFL champion (1921–1924, 1926); 4× First-team All-Pro (1920, 1922–1924); NFL 1920s All-Decade Team; Consensus All-American (1915); First-team All-Western (1915)
- Military career
- Allegiance: United States
- Branch: U.S. Army
- Service years: 1918–1919
- Coaching profile at Pro Football Reference
- Stats at Pro Football Reference
- Pro Football Hall of Fame
- College Football Hall of Fame

Berlin Guy "Champ" Chamberlin (January 16, 1894 – April 4, 1967), sometimes misspelled Guy Chamberlain, was an American professional football player and coach. He was inducted into the College Football Hall of Fame in 1962 and the Pro Football Hall of Fame in 1965. He was also named in 1969 to the NFL 1920s All-Decade Team.

A native of Blue Springs, Nebraska, Chamberlin played college football as a halfback at Nebraska Wesleyan University in 1911 and 1912. He transferred to the University of Nebraska in 1913 and played at the halfback and end positions for the undefeated 1914 and 1915 Nebraska Cornhuskers football teams that won consecutive Missouri Valley Conference championships. He was a consensus first-team All-American in 1915, and he was selected in 1936 as the greatest player in Nebraska football history.

He played professional football for nine years with the Canton Bulldogs (1919), Decatur / Chicago Staleys (1920–1921), Canton Bulldogs (1922–1923), Cleveland Bulldogs (1924), Frankford Yellow Jackets (1925–1926), and Chicago Cardinals (1927). He won professional football championships in six of his nine seasons in professional football: as a player in 1919 with the undefeated Bulldogs and in 1921 with the Staleys, and as a player/coach in 1922, 1923, and 1924 with the Bulldogs and in 1926 with the Yellow Jackets. He compiled a 58-16-7 record in six years as a head coach in the National Football League (NFL), the best win percentage (.759) of any coach in NFL history with a minimum 50 games coached. He is also the only coach to win NFL championships with three different clubs.

== Early life ==
Chamberlin was born in Blue Springs, Nebraska, in 1894. He was raised with five siblings on a family farm in Blue Springs. He graduated from Blue Springs High School in 1911.

== College football ==
=== Nebraska Wesleyan ===
In the fall of 1911, Chamberlin enrolled at Nebraska Wesleyan University in Lincoln, Nebraska. Chamberlin was selected by the Omaha World-Herald as an all-state halfback while playing for the undefeated 1911 Nebraska Wesleyan football team that won the NIAA championship. Chamberlin also competed for Nebraska Wesleyan in baseball as a pitcher and outfielder and in track as a sprinter and weight man.

He returned to the Nebraska Wesleyan football team in the fall of 1912 and was again selected as an all-state player. In announcing its selection of Chamberlin to the all-state team, the Omaha World-Herald wrote: "Chamberlin is almost in a class by himself. He is a fierce and aggressive runner and adopts the system of bowling over the opposing tacklers in much the same style as the famous Coy of Yale. Chamberlin rarely used a stiff arm, and yet many times it was next to impossible to stop him."

=== Nebraska ===
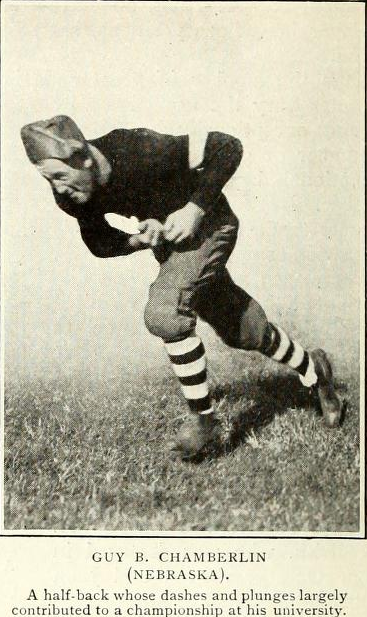
Chamberlin at Nebraska.

In the fall of 1913, Chamberlin transferred to the University of Nebraska in Lincoln. There he became a member of Beta Theta Pi fraternity. He played halfback for Jumbo Stiehm's undefeated 1914 Nebraska Cornhuskers football team that won the Missouri Valley Conference championship and became known as the "Stiehm Rollers". At the end of the 1914 season, Chamberlin was named to Outing magazine's "Football Roll of Honor: The Men Whom the Best Coaches of the Country Have Named as the Stars of the Gridiron in 1914".

In 1915, Chamberlin moved to the end position for the undefeated 1915 Nebraska Cornhuskers football team that again won the Missouri Valley championship. He led the team with 15 touchdowns. After leading the Cornhuskers to a 20–19 victory over Notre Dame, The Omaha World-Herald wrote of Chamberlin: "His defensive stunts bordered upon the miraculous, while his open field running, in which he displayed that famous 'side walk trot' to the best advantage, brought victory to the colors of the Cornhuskers." In his final game for Nebraska, Chamberlin scored four touchdowns, including a 60-yard touchdown run, in a 52–7 victory over Iowa. At the end of the season, he was a consensus All-American on the 1915 College Football All-America Team with first-team honors from Frank G. Menke, Walter Eckersall, and Parke H. Davis. He graduated from Nebraska in 1916.

== 1916–1919 ==
=== Farmer and coach at Doane College ===
After graduating from Nebraska, Chamberlin returned to the family farm. In August 1916, he was hired as the athletic director and football coach at Doane College in Crete, Nebraska. In 1917, he returned to work on his father's farm in Blue Springs, Nebraska.

=== United States Army ===
Chamberlin served in the United States Army from May 1918 to October 1919. He served in a field artillery unit with the rank of second lieutenant and was stationed at Camp Zachary Taylor in Louisville, Kentucky, Fort Sill in Oklahoma, and Camp Kearny in San Diego County, California.

== Professional football ==
=== Canton Bulldogs ===
Chamberlin began playing professional football in 1919 as an end for Jim Thorpe's undefeated 1919 Canton Bulldogs, winners of that year's unofficial professional football championship with a 9–0–1 record.

=== Decatur/Chicago Staleys ===
In August 1920, the American Professional Football Association (APFA, later renamed the National Football League) was organized. Chamberlin signed with George Halas' 1920 Decatur Staleys team that compiled a 10–1–2 record and finished second in the APFA. At the end of the 1920 season, Chamberlin was selected as a first-team end on the first All-Pro Team.

In 1921, Chamberlin played as a center fielder for the Staleys baseball team during the summer, and he remained with the organization as the Staleys football team moved to Chicago and won the APFA championship with a 9–1–1 record. On December 3, 1921, before a crowd of 13,000 in Chicago, the Staleys defeated the first-place Buffalo All-Americans in what was touted as the championship game. In the victory over Buffalo, Chamberlain intercepted a pass and returned it 90 yards for the game-winning touchdown.

George Halas, who coached Chamberlin with the Staleys, wrote in 1957: "Chamberlin was the best 2-way end I've ever seen. He was a tremendous tackler on defense and a triple-threat performer on offense."

=== Canton/Cleveland Bulldogs ===
In 1922, Chamberlin joined the Canton Bulldogs in multiple roles as a player, head coach, team captain, and part owner. He strengthened the team in the off-season by signing guard Tarzan Taylor, with whom he had played on the Staleys, and tackle Link Lyman, an All-American who played at Chamberlin's alma mater, Nebraska. Chamberlin led the 1922 Bulldogs to an NFL championship with an undefeated 10–0–2 record. The team shut out nine of twelve opponents and allowed only 15 points in 12 games. Three players from the 1922 Bulldogs (Chamberlin, Lyman, and Pete Henry) were later inducted into the Pro Football Hall of Fame. Chamberlin led the team in scoring with seven touchdowns, two of them on interception returns. He played at the halfback position in the first game of the season and at end for the remaining 12 games; he reportedly "played every minute of the thirteen games."

Chamberlin returned to the Bulldogs as player/coach the following year. The 1923 team had another undefeated season (11–0–1), shut out eight of twelve opponents, outscored all opponents by a combined total of 246 to 19, and won its second consecutive NFL championship. After the season, Chamberlin was selected as a first-team All-Pro player by Collyer's Eye magazine.

In August 1924, Cleveland jeweler Samuel Deutsch bought the Canton Bulldogs and moved the team to Cleveland where they became the Cleveland Bulldogs during the 1924 NFL season. With Chamberlin still serving as player/coach, the Bulldogs compiled a 7–1–1 record, outscored opponents by a total of 229 to 60, and won their third consecutive NFL championship. After the 1924 season, Chamberlin was again selected as a first-team All-Pro by Collyer's Eye and a third-team All-Pro by the Green Bay Press-Gazette.

In three seasons with the Bulldogs, Chamberlin led the franchise to three NFL championships and a record of 28–1–4, having outscored opponents by a combined total of 659 to 94. Dave Noble, who played for the 1924 Bulldogs, explained Chamberlin's coaching success as follows: "Guy Chamberlain knows as much or more football than any other coach in the country. Moreover, he has a faculty for getting the most out of players, not because he is a driver, for he isn't that sort, but because they like him and will do their utmost to please him by playing hard."

=== Frankford Yellow Jackets ===
In 1925, Chamberlin joined the Frankford Yellow Jackets in Philadelphia as player and coach. He led the 1925 Frankford team to a 15–7 overall record, 13–7 against NFL opponents. The team had compiled a 9–1 record in its first 10 games, but Chamberlin suffered a broken shoulder in a game against Akron, and the Yellow Jackets lost six of the next eight games. Chamberlin returned to the lineup in mid-December and led the team to victories in its final two games.

In 1926, Chamberlin returned to Philadelphia and appeared in all 17 games as a player, despite being the oldest player on the team at age 32. He led the 1926 Yellow Jackets to an NFL championship with a 14–1–2 record, shutting out 10 NFL opponents and outscoring all NFL opponents, 236 to 49. On December 4, 1926, the Yellow Jackets defeated the previously unbeaten Chicago Bears, 7–6, to secure the championship. In a 1968 book titled "Pro Football's All-time Greats", the author wrote that Chamberlin blocked both an extra point and a field goal in the victory over the Bears, though contemporary accounts do not corroborate the claim.

Chamberlin left the team after the 1926 season for unclear reasons; sports historian Bob Carroll notes that "one [theory] is that Chamberlin and the players he wanted were too costly. Another theory is that he was fired as a result of a power battle within the Frankford organization." In two years at Frankford, Chamberlin led the Yellow Jackets to Philadelphia's first NFL championship and compiled a 27-8-2 record against NFL opponents.

=== Chicago Cardinals ===
In August 1927, Chamberlin signed as player/coach for the Chicago Cardinals. With the exception of Ben Jones, the 1927 Cardinals lacked star players, and Chamberlin at age 33 started only one game. The team compiled a 3–7–1 and finished ninth in the NFL.

== Legacy and honors ==
With a 58-16-7 record in six years as an NFL head coach, Chamberlin has the best win percentage (.759) of any coach in NFL history with a minimum of 50 games. See List of National Football League head coaches with 50 wins. His accomplishment of winning a championship with three separate franchises in a major North American sports league would not be matched until 1997, when Scotty Bowman won the 1997 Stanley Cup Finals. Author Chris Willis ranks Chamberlin as the fifth-greatest NFL player in the period from 1920 to 1945, writing that Chamberlin "performed the dual role of player-coach better than anybody in the first decade of the NFL."

Chamberlin received numerous honors for his accomplishments as a football player and coach. His honors include the following:

- In 1936, Chamberlin was named the greatest player in Nebraska football history in a poll of former Nebraska football players.
- In 1951, he became the fifth person inducted into the Nebraska Sports Hall of Fame.
- In 1962, he was inducted into the College Football Hall of Fame. On learning of his selection, Chamberlin said he accepted the honor to share it with all members of the 1914 and 1915 Nebraska football teams and paid particular tribute to Dick Rutherford who was the blocking star during those years.
- Also in 1962, a new baseball diamond was dedicated at the Nebraska State Reformatory, where Chamberlin had been a guard for seven-and-a-half year was named Guy Chamberlin Field. The name was chosen by popular vote among the inmates. At the dedication ceremony, Governor Frank B. Morrison praised Chamberlin for his devotion to the inmates.
- In 1965, he was also inducted into the Pro Football Hall of Fame in 1965 as part of the third class of inductees. His Pro Football Hall of Fame bust and certificate are displayed in the gallery cabinet at the Beta Theta Pi fraternity house at the University of Nebraska-Lincoln.
- In 1967, the University of Nebraska began awarding the Guy Chamberlin Trophy. It is awarded each year to the player "who has the qualities and dedication of the Husker Tradition." Past winners include Jordan Westerkamp (2016), Dean Steinkuhler (1984), Maury Damkroger (1974), Rich Glover (1973), and Jeff Kinney (1972).
- In 1969, as part of the NFL's 50th anniversary, the Pro Football Hall of Fame selected all-decade teams for each of the league's first five decades. Chamberlin was selected as an end on the NFL 1920s All-Decade Team.
- In 1971, he was one of eight persons (along with Bob Devaney, Ed Weir, George Sauer, Dana X. Bible, Biff Jones, Fielding H. Yost, and Eddie N. Robinson) in the first class to be inducted into the Nebraska Football Hall of Fame.
- In 2014, a monument to Chamberlin was dedicated on the grounds of Southern Elementary School in Blue Springs, Nebraska.
- In 2017, his jersey was retired by the University of Nebraska and his name was added to the north facade of Memorial Stadium.

== Family and later years ==
Chamberlin was married twice. He married Lucile B. Lees in 1919. They had a daughter, Patricia, born in 1923. Chamberlin and his first wife were divorced. In 1941, he was married to Bernyce Gertrude Weekes.

After retiring from football, was a salesman in Cleveland for several years. He returned to Blue Springs in 1932, where he managed his father's farm. In 1948, he moved to Nebraska City, Nebraska, where he owned and operated a Ford-Ferguson agricultural equipment dealership. In 1954 or 1955, he sold the Ford-Ferguson business and moved to Lincoln, Nebraska, where he was employed as a guard at the Nebraska State Reformatory. He retired in 1962.

Chamberlin died in 1967 at age 73 in Lincoln, Nebraska. Per Chamberlin's request, his body was cremated, and his ashes were spread in his hometown, Blue Springs, Nebraska.

== Head coaching record ==
Team	Year	Regular season					Postseason			
Team	Year	Won	Lost	Ties	Win %	Finish	Won	Lost	Win %	Result
CAN	1922	10	0	2	1.000	1st in NFL	–	–	–	NFL Champions
CAN	1923	11	0	1	1.000	1st in NFL	–	–	–	NFL Champions
CTN Total		21	0	3	1.000	–	–	–	–	
CLE	1924	7	1	1	.875	1st in NFL	–	–	–	NFL Champions on tiebreaker over Chicago Bears
CLE Total		7	1	1	.875	–	–	–	–	
FYJ	1925	13	7	0	.650	6th in NFL	–	–	–	–
FYJ	1926	14	1	2	.933	1st in NFL	–	–	–	NFL Champions
FYJ Total		27	8	2	.771	–	–	–	–	
CHI	1927	3	7	1	.300	9th in NFL	–	–	–	–
CHI Total		3	7	1	.300	–	–	–	–	
Total		58	16	7	.759		–	–	–	–
