= 1915 Ohio Green and White football team =

American college football season

1915 Ohio Green and White football
- Conference: Ohio Athletic Conference
- Record: 7–2 (2–1 OAC)
- Head coach: M. B. Banks (3rd season)

1915 Ohio Athletic Conference football standings
	Conf.					Overall
Team	W		L		T	W		L		T
Western Reserve $	6	–	1	–	0	7	–	2	–	0
Miami (OH)	5	–	1	–	0	6	–	2	–	0
Denison	5	–	2	–	0	6	–	2	–	0
Ohio	2	–	1	–	0	8	–	1	–	0
Wooster	3	–	1	–	2	3	–	3	–	2
Case	4	–	2	–	1	5	–	5	–	1
Oberlin	3	–	3	–	0	4	–	4	–	0
Cincinnati	3	–	4	–	0	5	–	4	–	0
Ohio Wesleyan	3	–	3	–	0	4	–	5	–	0
Kenyon	1	–	6	–	0	3	–	6	–	0
Akron	1	–	6	–	0	1	–	7	–	1
Wittenberg	0	–	4	–	1	3	–	5	–	1
Mount Union	0	–	5	–	0	3	–	7	–	0
Baldwin–Wallace	0	–	0	–	0	0	–	0	–	0
Ohio State *	3	–	0	–	0	5	–	1	–	1
$ – Conference champion; * – did not complete for championship

The 1915 Ohio Green and White football team was an American football team that represented Ohio University in the Ohio Athletic Conference (OAC) during the 1915 college football season. In its third season under head coach M. B. Banks, the team compiled an 7–2 record (2–1 against conference opponents), and finished in fourth place out of 15 teams in the OAC.

== Schedule ==
Date	Opponent	Site	Result	Source
September 25	at Transylvania*	Thomas Field; Lexington, KY	L 0–16	
October 2	Ohio Northern*	Athens, OH	W 46–0	
October 9	at Cincinnati	Cincinnati, OH	W 15–0	
October 16	Muskingum*	Athens, OH	W 35–0	
October 23	at Otterbein*	Westerville, OH	W 48–7	
October 30	Marietta*	Athens, OH	W 16–6	
November 6	Wittenberg	Athens, OH	W 12–0	
November 13	at Miami (OH)	Oxford, OH (rivalry)	L 6–13	
November 20	Marshall*	Athens, OH (rivalry)	W 18–7	
*Non-conference game
