= 1915 Western Reserve football team =

American college football season

1915 Western Reserve football

OAC champion
- Conference: Ohio Athletic Conference
- Record: 7–2 (6–1 OAC)
- Head coach: Walter D. Powell (2nd season)

1915 Ohio Athletic Conference football standings
	Conf.					Overall
Team	W		L		T	W		L		T
Western Reserve $	6	–	1	–	0	7	–	2	–	0
Miami (OH)	5	–	1	–	0	6	–	2	–	0
Denison	5	–	2	–	0	6	–	2	–	0
Ohio	2	–	1	–	0	8	–	1	–	0
Wooster	3	–	1	–	2	3	–	3	–	2
Case	4	–	2	–	1	5	–	5	–	1
Oberlin	3	–	3	–	0	4	–	4	–	0
Cincinnati	3	–	4	–	0	5	–	4	–	0
Ohio Wesleyan	3	–	3	–	0	4	–	5	–	0
Kenyon	1	–	6	–	0	3	–	6	–	0
Akron	1	–	6	–	0	1	–	7	–	1
Wittenberg	0	–	4	–	1	3	–	5	–	1
Mount Union	0	–	5	–	0	3	–	7	–	0
Baldwin–Wallace	0	–	0	–	0	0	–	0	–	0
Ohio State *	3	–	0	–	0	5	–	1	–	1
$ – Conference champion; * – did not complete for championship

The 1915 Western Reserve football team represented Western Reserve University, now known as Case Western Reserve University, during the 1915 college football season. The team's coach was Walter D. Powell.

== Schedule ==
Date	Opponent	Site	Result
October 2	at Hiram*	Hiram, OH	W 3–0
October 9	Kenyon	Cleveland, OH	W 21–0
October 16	Ohio Wesleyan	Cleveland, OH	L 12–24
October 23	at Akron	Akron, OH	W 53–0
October 30	Denison	Cleveland, OH	W 19–14
November 6	at Oberlin	Oberlin, OH	W 38–7
November 13	Mount Union	Cleveland, OH	W 35–0
November 20	at Carnegie Tech*	Pittsburgh, PA	L 6–36
November 25	at Case	Van Horn Field; Cleveland, OH	W 26–20
*Non-conference game
