= Merton Dunnigan =

American football player (1894–1937)

Pat Dunnigan
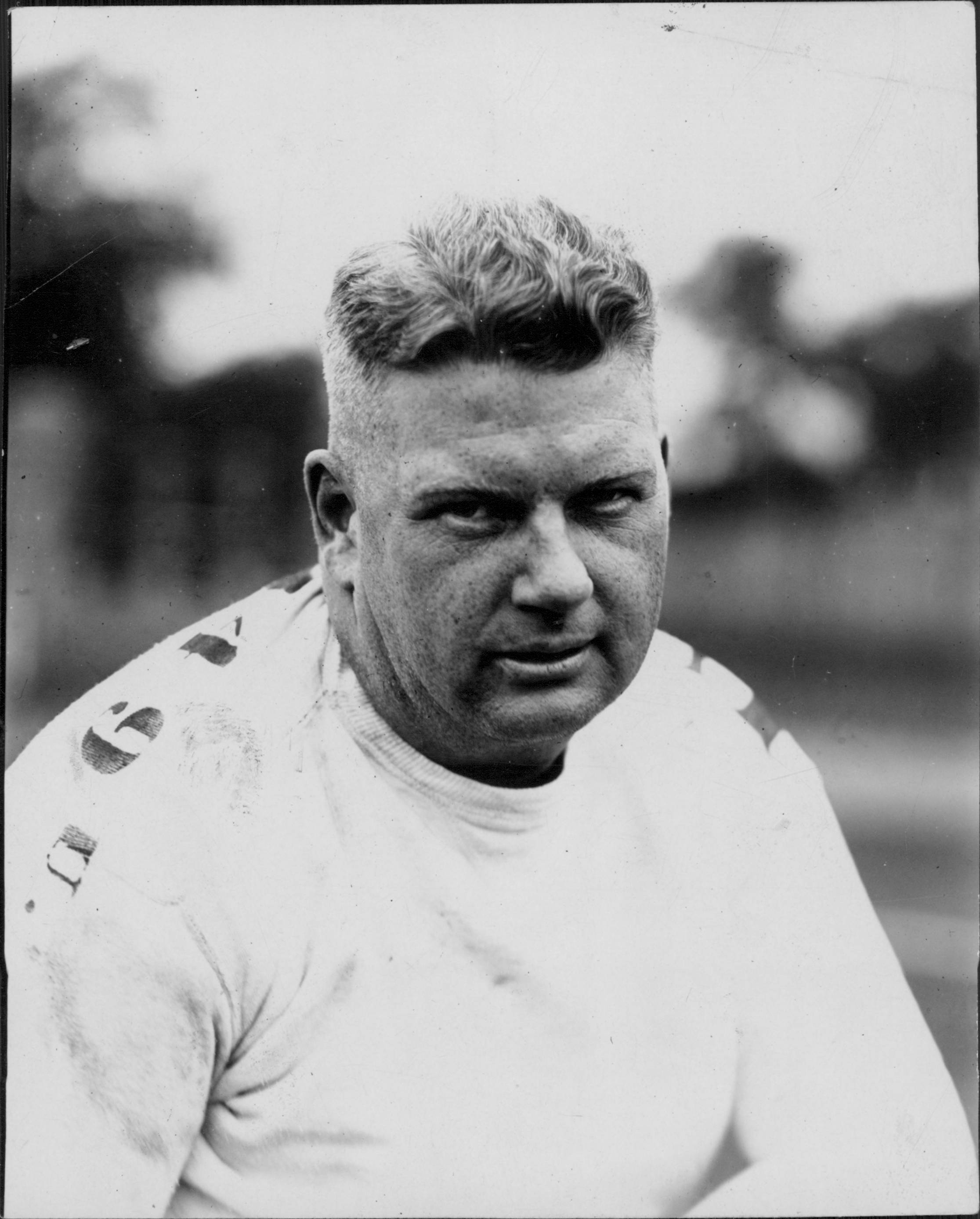

Profile
- Positions: End, Guard, Tackle

Personal information
- Born: January 24, 1894; Bay City, Minnesota, United States
- Died: March 30, 1937 (aged 43); Minneapolis, Minnesota, United States
- Listed height: 5 ft 10 in (1.78 m)
- Listed weight: 206 lb (93 kg)

Career information
- College: Minnesota

Career history
- Green Bay Packers (1922); Minneapolis Marines (1924); Milwaukee Badgers (1925–1926)

Awards and highlights
- First-team All-Western (1915)
- Stats at Pro Football Reference

Merton Arthur Dunnigan (January 24, 1894 – March 30, 1937), sometimes known as "Mert" or "Pat", was an American football player. He played college football for Minnesota from 1913 to 1915 and professional football for the Green Bay Packers (1922), Minneapolis Marines (1924), and Milwaukee Badgers (1925–1926). He later served as an assistant football coach at Minnesota from 1932 to 1937.

== Early life ==
Dunnigan was born in 1895 in Bay City, Michigan. He attended West High School in Minneapolis.

== College athlete ==
He played college football for the University of Minnesota from 1913 to 1915. As a senior, he was selected by Walter Eckersall as a first-team guard on the 1915 All-America college football team. He was also selected by Frank G. Menke as a second-team All-American.

== Professional football ==
He played professional football for Duluth (1917), the Green Bay Packers (1922), Minneapolis Marines (1924), and Milwaukee Badgers (1925–1926). He appeared in 20 NFL games as an end tackle, and guard.

== Coaching career ==
Dunnigan served three different stints as an assistant coach at Minnesota, first under head coach Henry L. Williams from 1917 to 1919, then under Clarence Spears in the 1920s, and finally under Bernie Bierman in the 1930s.

== Death ==
Dunnigan died in his sleep of a cerebral hemorrhage in 1937 at age 42.

== See also ==
- 1915 College Football All-America Team
