= 1915 Miami Redskins football team =

American college football season

1915 Miami Redskins football
- Conference: Ohio Athletic Conference
- Record: 6–2 (5–1 OAC)
- Head coach: Chester J. Roberts (1st season)
- Home stadium: Miami Field

1915 Ohio Athletic Conference football standings
	Conf.					Overall
Team	W		L		T	W		L		T
Western Reserve $	6	–	1	–	0	7	–	2	–	0
Miami (OH)	5	–	1	–	0	6	–	2	–	0
Denison	5	–	2	–	0	6	–	2	–	0
Ohio	2	–	1	–	0	8	–	1	–	0
Wooster	3	–	1	–	2	3	–	3	–	2
Case	4	–	2	–	1	5	–	5	–	1
Oberlin	3	–	3	–	0	4	–	4	–	0
Cincinnati	3	–	4	–	0	5	–	4	–	0
Ohio Wesleyan	3	–	3	–	0	4	–	5	–	0
Kenyon	1	–	6	–	0	3	–	6	–	0
Akron	1	–	6	–	0	1	–	7	–	1
Wittenberg	0	–	4	–	1	3	–	5	–	1
Mount Union	0	–	5	–	0	3	–	7	–	0
Baldwin–Wallace	0	–	0	–	0	0	–	0	–	0
Ohio State *	3	–	0	–	0	5	–	1	–	1
$ – Conference champion; * – did not complete for championship

The 1915 Miami Redskins football team was an American football team that represented Miami University as a member of the Ohio Athletic Conference (OAC) during the 1915 college football season. Led by coach Chester J. Roberts in his first year, Miami compiled a 6–2 record.

== Schedule ==
Date	Opponent	Site	Result	Attendance
September 25	Ohio Northern		W 41–0	
October 2	at Akron		W 23–6	
October 9	at Indiana		L 0–41	
October 23	at Mount Union		W 17–0	
October 30	Ohio Wesleyan		W 19–7	
November 6	vs. Denison		L 0–14	
November 13	Ohio	(rivalry)	W 13–7	
November 25	at Cincinnati	(Victory Bell)	W 24–12	
