= Cub Buck =

American football player and coach (1892–1966)

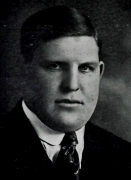

Biographical details
- Born: August 7, 1892; Eau Claire, Wisconsin, U.S.
- Died: June 14, 1966 (aged 73); Davenport, Iowa, U.S.

Playing career
- 1913–1915: Wisconsin
- 1916–1920: Canton Bulldogs
- 1921–1925: Green Bay Packers
- Position: Tackle

Coaching career (HC unless noted)
- 1916: Wisconsin (assistant)
- 1917–1919: Carleton
- 1923: Lawrence
- 1927–1928: Miami (FL)

Administrative career (AD unless noted)
- 1917–1919: Carleton

Head coaching record
- Overall: 21–20–3

Accomplishments and honors

Awards
- Second-team All-Pro (1920); Green Bay Packers Hall of Fame (1977); Consensus All-American (1915); 2× First-team All-Western (1914, 1915); Wisconsin State Athletic Hall of Fame (1956); University of Wisconsin Athletic Department Hall of Fame (1991); University of Wisconsin's All-Time Football Team

Howard Pierce "Cub" Buck (August 7, 1892 – June 14, 1966) was an American football player and coach. He played as a tackle at the University of Wisconsin, captaining the team and earning consensus All-American honors in 1915. Buck then played professionally for 10 seasons in the National Football League (NFL) with the Canton Bulldogs (1916–1920) and Green Bay Packers (1921–1925). He served as the head football coach at Carleton College from 1917 to 1919, at Lawrence College in 1923, and as the first head coach at the University of Miami from 1926 to 1928. Buck was inducted into the Wisconsin State Athletic Hall of Fame in 1956, the Green Bay Packers Hall of Fame in 1977, and the University of Wisconsin Athletic Department Hall of Fame in 1991.

== Early life and college playing career ==
Buck was born on August 7, 1892, in Eau Claire, Wisconsin. He attended high school there and was named to Wisconsin's all-state prep team as a center. Playing for the Wisconsin Badgers from 1913 to 1915, he never missed a game and earned three All-Western Conference honors.

== Coaching and professional playing career ==
After graduating, Buck served as an assistant football coach at Wisconsin in 1916. That year he also starting playing professional football for the Canton Bulldogs. Buck played under an assumed name, Moriarity, because his parents didn't want him playing professionally, especially on Sundays. Buck coached at Wisconsin during the week and for games on Saturdays, then travelled to the site of the Bulldogs game on Sunday.

In 1917, Buck was hired as the head football coach and athletic director at Carleton College at age 25. Coaching through World War I and the 1918 influenza pandemic, in three years his teams were 10–7. He continued to play with Jim Thorpe and the Bulldogs through 1920, the first year of the American Professional Football Association. Thorpe called Buck the greatest lineman he had played with or against.

Buck added an extra game in 1920 by playing in the Green Bay Packers' last game of their season. In 1921, the Packers joined the fledgling professional league that would become the National Football League (NFL). Curly Lambeau made Buck the first Packer with a guaranteed salary by paying him $75 per game. That year was the first Green Bay–Chicago game and it featured the first cheap shot of the storied rivalry. John "Tarzan" Taylor slugged Buck and broke his nose.

Buck played for the Packers through the 1925 season. Besides playing both sides of the line, Buck was the punter and placekicker. From 1922 to 1925, Buck made 24 of 35 extra points and 10 of 28 field goals for a total of 54 points. He led the Packers in scoring in 1923 and threw a touchdown pass in 1924. While playing for the Packers, Buck coached for the Lawrence Vikings, mainly as an assistant, but he was the head coach for the 1923 season. He was also the executive director of the Boy Scouts in Appleton.

In 1926, Buck became the first head coach of the Miami Hurricanes football program. Before the team could play its first game, a hurricane destroyed the under-construction stadium and postponed the start of the season. The first team was a freshman squad; they went 8–0, including two defeats of the University of Havana, one in Miami and one in Havana. During the first two varsity seasons, the Hurricanes were 3–6–1 in 1927 and 4–4–1 in 1928.

== Later life and death ==
Buck left football coaching in 1929, but he often went to three football games each weekend during the season. He moved to Rock Island, Illinois and opened a car dealership. He died in Davenport, Iowa in 1966.

== Head coaching record ==
Year	Team	Overall	Conference	Standing
Carleton (1917–1919)
1917	Carleton	4–1		
1918	Carleton	2–2		
1919	Carleton	4–4		
Carleton:		10–7		
Lawrence Vikings (Midwest Conference) (1923)
1923	Lawrence	4–3–1	2–1–1	3rd
Lawrence:		4–3–1	2–1–1	
Miami Hurricanes (Independent) (1927–1928)
1927	Miami	3–6–1		
1928	Miami	4–4–1		
Miami:		7–10–2		
Total:		21–20–3		
