= 1915 Iowa Hawkeyes football team =

American college football season

1915 Iowa Hawkeyes football
- Conference: Western Conference
- Record: 3–4 (1–2 Western)
- Head coach: Jesse Hawley (6th season)
- Captain: Irving J. Barron
- Home stadium: Iowa Field

1915 Western Conference football standings
	Conf.					Overall
Team	W		L		T	W		L		T
Minnesota +	3	–	0	–	1	6	–	0	–	1
Illinois +	3	–	0	–	2	5	–	0	–	2
Chicago	4	–	2	–	0	5	–	2	–	0
Ohio State	2	–	1	–	1	5	–	1	–	1
Purdue	2	–	2	–	0	3	–	3	–	1
Wisconsin	2	–	3	–	0	4	–	3	–	0
Iowa	1	–	2	–	0	3	–	4	–	0
Indiana	1	–	3	–	0	3	–	3	–	1
Northwestern	0	–	5	–	0	2	–	5	–	0
+ – Conference co-champions

The 1915 Iowa Hawkeyes football team was an American football team that represented the University of Iowa as a member of the Western Conference during the 1915 college football season. In their sixth and final year under head coach Jesse Hawley, the Hawkeyes compiled a 3–4 record (1–2 in conference games), finished in seventh place in the Western Conference, and were outscored by a total of 150 to 92.

The team played its home games at Iowa Field in Iowa City, Iowa.

== Schedule ==
Date	Opponent	Site	Result	Attendance	Source
October 2	Cornell (IA)*	Iowa Field; Iowa City, IA	W 33–0		
October 9	at Morningside*	Sioux City, IA	W 17–6		
October 16	Northwestern	Iowa Field; Iowa City, IA	W 9–6		
October 23	at Minnesota	Northrop Field; Minneapolis, MN (rivalry)	L 13–51	6,000	
November 6	at Purdue	Stuart Field; West Lafayette, IN	L 13–19		
November 13	Iowa State*^{†}	Iowa Field; Iowa City, IA (rivalry)	L 0–16		
November 20	Nebraska*	Nebraska Field; Lincoln, NE (rivalry)	L 7–52		
*Non-conference game; ^{†}Homecoming

== Players ==
- Irving J. Barron, tackle and captain
- James Blackburn
- Clifton Bowlsby
- John Davis
- William Donnelly
- Floyd Duncan
- Robert Fosdick
- Herman Garretson
- Samuel Gross
- Frank Grubb
- George Holmes
- Grover Jacobsen
- Joseph Kerwick
- Charles Laun
- Howard McKee
- Otho Mendenhall
- Max Wilson
