= Neno DaPrato =

American football player (1893–1984)

Jerry DaPrato
Profile
- Position: Fullback

Personal information
- Born: January 14, 1893; Iron Mountain, Michigan
- Died: April 29, 1984 (aged 91); Parkesburg, Pennsylvania
- Listed height: 5 ft 10 in (1.78 m)
- Listed weight: 185 lb (84 kg)

Career information
- High school: Iron Mountain High School
- College: Michigan Agricultural College

Career history
- Detroit Heralds (1920); Detroit Tigers (1921)

Awards and highlights
- Consensus All-American (1915)
- Stats at Pro Football Reference

Neno Joseph "Jerry" DaPrato (January 14, 1893 – April 29, 1984) was an American football player. He played college football for Michigan Agricultural College and was selected as a consensus first-team All-American in 1915. He also played professional football for the Detroit Heralds and Detroit Tigers.

== Early life ==
DaPrato was born in 1893 in Iron Mountain in the Upper Peninsula of Michigan and graduated from Iron Mountain High School.

== Football player ==
=== Michigan Agricultural ===
DaPrato attended Michigan Agricultural College (M.A.C., later renamed Michigan State University), where he played college football at the halfback position for the M.A.C. Aggies from 1914 to 1915. DaPrato was a multi-talented player who ran with the ball, handled place-kicking and punting, and was also considered "a fine forward passer." The 1915 M.A.C. team compiled a 5–1 record, including a 24 to 0 victory over rival Michigan, and the Detroit Free Press called DaPrato "the leader of the best team M.A.C. ever had." In M.A.C's 24–0 victory over Michigan, the game was played on Michigan's home field, and DaPrato scored all 24 points for M.A.C., consisting of three touchdowns, three extra points, and a field goal. On November 6, 1915, DePrato played in his final game for M.A.C., a 68 to 6 victory over Marquette. He scored four touchdowns, threw a long touchdown pass to Henning, kicked eight extra points, and tallied 22 points scored in his final game.

At the end of the 1915 season, DaPrato was a consensus first-team selection on the 1915 College Football All-America Team. He was called "the greatest scoring machine of the year" after scoring 130 points in just six games during the 1915 season.

=== Detroit Heralds and Tigers ===
DaPrato also played professional football for the Detroit Heralds starting in November 1915. He made his pro debut on Sunday, November 7, 1915—one day after he appeared in his final collegiate game for M.A.C. DaPrato started at left halfback in a game that ended in a scoreless tie with Lancaster. The Detroit Free Press noted: "Jerry De Prato helped some while he was in there, but he was so banged up from the Marquette game that he was forced to retire after the first half." The following week, DaPrato led the Heralds to a 69 to 0 victory over the Buffalo Bisons. DaPrato "emphatically demonstrated how to batter a line and skirt the ends," as he ran for a touchdown and converted 9 of 10 extra point attempts for a total of 15 points.

During World War I, DaPrato's football career was interrupted by military service. He served with the United States Army in Germany and was appointed acting mayor of a German town during the occupation. DaPrato wrote from Germany, "I am the mayor of the town and the boss of everybody in it, Germans included."

In September 1920, the NFL (called the American Professional Football Association during the 1920 and 1921 seasons) was founded at a meeting in the Hupmobile auto showroom of the owner of the Canton Bulldogs. In the inaugural season of the NFL, DaPrato played at the fullback position for the 1920 Detroit Heralds. He played in the 1921 NFL season with the Detroit Tigers.

== Later life ==
In October 1922, DaPrato joined the Michigan National Guard with the rank of captain. He married Elizabeth Parke, a nurse he had met during the war, and the DaPratos were the last family members to reside in the historic David Parke House in Parkesburg, Pennsylvania. DaPrato died there in 1984 at age 91.

== See also ==
- List of NCAA major college football yearly rushing leaders
- List of NCAA major college football yearly scoring leaders
