= 1915 Purdue Boilermakers football team =

American college football season

1915 Purdue Boilermakers football
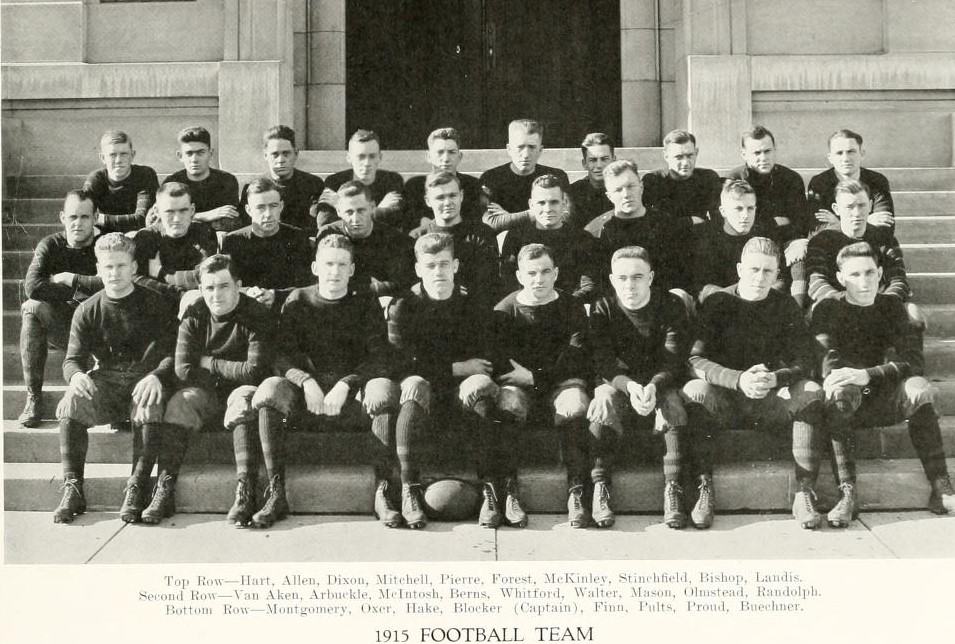
- Conference: Western Conference
- Record: 3–3–1 (2–2 Western)
- Head coach: Andy Smith (3rd season)
- Captain: Frank B. Blocker
- Home stadium: Stuart Field

1915 Western Conference football standings
	Conf.					Overall
Team	W		L		T	W		L		T
Minnesota +	3	–	0	–	1	6	–	0	–	1
Illinois +	3	–	0	–	2	5	–	0	–	2
Chicago	4	–	2	–	0	5	–	2	–	0
Ohio State	2	–	1	–	1	5	–	1	–	1
Purdue	2	–	2	–	0	3	–	3	–	1
Wisconsin	2	–	3	–	0	4	–	3	–	0
Iowa	1	–	2	–	0	3	–	4	–	0
Indiana	1	–	3	–	0	3	–	3	–	1
Northwestern	0	–	5	–	0	2	–	5	–	0
+ – Conference co-champions

The 1915 Purdue Boilermakers football team was an American football team that represented Purdue University during the 1915 college football season. In their third season under head coach “fighting” Andy Smith, the Boilermakers compiled a 3–3–1 record, finished in a tie for fifth place in the Western Conference with a 2–2 record against conference opponents, allowing the same number of points, 62. “Indestructible” Frank B. Blocker was the team captain.

== Schedule ==
Date	Opponent	Site	Result	Source
October 2	Wabash*	Stuart Field; West Lafayette, IN	T 7–7	
October 9	Beloit*	Stuart Field; West Lafayette, IN	W 26–0	
October 16	Wisconsin	Stuart Field; West Lafayette, IN	L 3–28	
October 23	at Chicago	Stagg Field; Chicago, IL (rivalry)	L 0–7	
November 6	Iowa	Stuart Field; West Lafayette, IN	W 19–13	
November 13	at Kentucky*	Stoll Field; Lexington, KY	L 0–7	
November 20	at Indiana	Jordan Field; Bloomington, IN (Old Oaken Bucket)	W 7–0	
*Non-conference game

== Roster ==
- E. H. Allen, HB
- Raymond Arbuckle, G
- Bill Berns, T
- Kenneth Bishop, G
- Frank Blocker, T
- Charlie Buechner, T
- Dixon
- J. R. Finn, QB
- Forest
- Paul Hake, E
- Herbert L. Hart, C
- Landis
- Paul Mason, G
- J. A. McIntosh, T
- McKinley
- Russ Mitchell, C
- C. Montgomery, E
- J. Olmstead, C
- V. T. Oxen, FB
- Pierre
- M. J. Proud, G
- C. C. Pults, QB
- Herb Randolph, E
- Mike Stinchfield, E
- Warner Van Aken, HB
- P. L. Walter, HB
- Whitford
