= 1915 Cincinnati Bearcats football team =

American college football season

1915 Cincinnati Bearcats football
- Conference: Ohio Athletic Conference
- Record: 4–5 (3–4 OAC)
- Head coach: George Little (2nd season)
- Captain: Roy Palmer
- Home stadium: Carson Field

1915 Ohio Athletic Conference football standings
	Conf.					Overall
Team	W		L		T	W		L		T
Western Reserve $	6	–	1	–	0	7	–	2	–	0
Miami (OH)	5	–	1	–	0	6	–	2	–	0
Denison	5	–	2	–	0	6	–	2	–	0
Ohio	2	–	1	–	0	8	–	1	–	0
Wooster	3	–	1	–	2	3	–	3	–	2
Case	4	–	2	–	1	5	–	5	–	1
Oberlin	3	–	3	–	0	4	–	4	–	0
Cincinnati	3	–	4	–	0	5	–	4	–	0
Ohio Wesleyan	3	–	3	–	0	4	–	5	–	0
Kenyon	1	–	6	–	0	3	–	6	–	0
Akron	1	–	6	–	0	1	–	7	–	1
Wittenberg	0	–	4	–	1	3	–	5	–	1
Mount Union	0	–	5	–	0	3	–	7	–	0
Baldwin–Wallace	0	–	0	–	0	0	–	0	–	0
Ohio State *	3	–	0	–	0	5	–	1	–	1
$ – Conference champion; * – did not complete for championship

The 1915 Cincinnati Bearcats football team was an American football team that represented the University of Cincinnati as a member of the Ohio Athletic Conference during the 1915 college football season. In their second season under head coach George Little, the Bearcats compiled a 4–5 record (3–4 against conference opponents). Roy Palmer was the team captain. The team played home games at Carson Field in Cincinnati.

== Schedule ==
Date	Opponent	Site	Result	Source
September 26	Alumni*	Carson Field; Cincinnati, OH	W 14–7	
October 2	Georgetown (KY)*	Carson Field; Cincinnati, OH	L 7–21	
October 9	Ohio	Carson Field; Cincinnati, OH	L 0–15	
October 16	Kenyon	Carson Field; Cincinnati, OH	W 27–7	
October 23	Denison	Carson Field; Cincinnati, OH	L 0–35	
October 30	at Kentucky*	Stoll Field; Lexington, KY	L 6–27	
November 6	Ohio Wesleyan	Carson Field; Cincinnati, OH	W 17–6	
November 13	Wittenberg	Carson Field; Cincinnati, OH	W 27–16	
November 25	Miami (OH)	Carson Field; Cincinnati, OH (Victory Bell)	L 12–24	
*Non-conference game
