= 1915 Northwestern Purple football team =

American college football season

1915 Northwestern Purple football
- Conference: Western Conference
- Record: 2–5 (0–5 Western)
- Head coach: Fred J. Murphy (2nd season)
- Captain: Austin Stromberg
- Home stadium: Northwestern Field

1915 Western Conference football standings
	Conf.					Overall
Team	W		L		T	W		L		T
Minnesota +	3	–	0	–	1	6	–	0	–	1
Illinois +	3	–	0	–	2	5	–	0	–	2
Chicago	4	–	2	–	0	5	–	2	–	0
Ohio State	2	–	1	–	1	5	–	1	–	1
Purdue	2	–	2	–	0	3	–	3	–	1
Wisconsin	2	–	3	–	0	4	–	3	–	0
Iowa	1	–	2	–	0	3	–	4	–	0
Indiana	1	–	3	–	0	3	–	3	–	1
Northwestern	0	–	5	–	0	2	–	5	–	0
+ – Conference co-champions

The 1915 Northwestern Purple team represented Northwestern University during the 1915 college football season. In their second year under head coach Fred J. Murphy, the Purple compiled a 2–5 record (0–5 against Western Conference opponents) and finished in last place in the Western Conference.

== Schedule ==
Date	Opponent	Site	Result	Attendance	Source
October 2	Lake Forest	Northwestern Field; Evanston, IL	W 27–6		
October 9	Chicago	Northwestern Field; Evanston, IL	L 0–7		
October 15	at Iowa	Iowa Field; Iowa City, IA	L 6–9		
October 23	at Illinois	Illinois Field; Champaign, IL (rivalry)	L 6–36	4,424	
November 6	Missouri	Northwestern Field; Evanston, IL	W 24–6		
November 13	Indiana	Northwestern Field; Evanston, IL	L 6–14		
November 20	Ohio State	Northwestern Field; Evanston, IL	L 0–34		
