= Reynold Kraft =

American football player (1895–1951)

Profile
- Position: End

Personal information
- Born: March 29, 1895; Menomonie, Wisconsin, US
- Died: November 7, 1951 (aged 56); Chicago, Illinois, US
- Listed height: 5 ft 11 in (1.80 m)
- Listed weight: 70 lb (32 kg)

Career information
- College: Illinois

Career history
- Minneapolis Marines (1922)
- Stats at Pro Football Reference

Reynold Rudolph Kraft (March 29, 1895 – November 7, 1951) was a player in the National Football League (NFL) for the Minneapolis Marines in 1922 as an end. He played at the collegiate level at the University of Illinois, where he was the team captain in 1917.

== Biography ==
Kraft was born in 1895 in Menomonie, Wisconsin. He died in Chicago in 1951.
