= 1915 Chicago Maroons football team =

American college football season

1915 Chicago Maroons football
- Conference: Western Conference
- Record: 5–2 (5–2 Western)
- Head coach: Amos Alonzo Stagg (24th season)
- Home stadium: Stagg Field

1915 Western Conference football standings
	Conf.					Overall
Team	W		L		T	W		L		T
Minnesota +	3	–	0	–	1	6	–	0	–	1
Illinois +	3	–	0	–	2	5	–	0	–	2
Chicago	4	–	2	–	0	5	–	2	–	0
Ohio State	2	–	1	–	1	5	–	1	–	1
Purdue	2	–	2	–	0	3	–	3	–	1
Wisconsin	2	–	3	–	0	4	–	3	–	0
Iowa	1	–	2	–	0	3	–	4	–	0
Indiana	1	–	3	–	0	3	–	3	–	1
Northwestern	0	–	5	–	0	2	–	5	–	0
+ – Conference co-champions

The 1915 Chicago Maroons football team was an American football team that represented the University of Chicago during the 1915 college football season. In their 24th season under head coach Amos Alonzo Stagg, the Maroons compiled a 5–2 record, finished in third place in the Western Conference, and outscored all opponents by a combined total of 83 to 50.

== Schedule ==
Date	Opponent	Site	Result	Attendance	Source
October 9	at Northwestern	Northwestern Field; Evanston, IL	W 7–0		
October 16	Indiana	Stagg Field; Chicago, IL	W 13–7	> 10,000	
October 23	Purdue	Stagg Field; Chicago, IL (rivalry)	W 7–0		
October 30	Wisconsin	Stagg Field; Chicago, IL	W 14–13		
November 6	Haskell*	Stagg Field; Chicago, IL	W 35–0		
November 13	at Minnesota	Northrop Field; Minneapolis, MN	L 7–20	20,000	
November 20	Illinois	Stagg Field; Chicago, IL	L 0–10	24,078	
*Non-conference game
