= 1915 Ohio State Buckeyes football team =

American college football season

1915 Ohio State Buckeyes football
- Conference: Western Conference, Ohio Athletic Conference
- Record: 5–1–1 (2–1–1 Western, 3–0 OAC)
- Head coach: John Wilce (3rd season)
- Home stadium: Ohio Field

1915 Western Conference football standings
	Conf.					Overall
Team	W		L		T	W		L		T
Minnesota +	3	–	0	–	1	6	–	0	–	1
Illinois +	3	–	0	–	2	5	–	0	–	2
Chicago	4	–	2	–	0	5	–	2	–	0
Ohio State	2	–	1	–	1	5	–	1	–	1
Purdue	2	–	2	–	0	3	–	3	–	1
Wisconsin	2	–	3	–	0	4	–	3	–	0
Iowa	1	–	2	–	0	3	–	4	–	0
Indiana	1	–	3	–	0	3	–	3	–	1
Northwestern	0	–	5	–	0	2	–	5	–	0
+ – Conference co-champions

1915 Ohio Athletic Conference football standings
	Conf.					Overall
Team	W		L		T	W		L		T
Western Reserve $	6	–	1	–	0	7	–	2	–	0
Miami (OH)	5	–	1	–	0	6	–	2	–	0
Denison	5	–	2	–	0	6	–	2	–	0
Ohio	2	–	1	–	0	8	–	1	–	0
Wooster	3	–	1	–	2	3	–	3	–	2
Case	4	–	2	–	1	5	–	5	–	1
Oberlin	3	–	3	–	0	4	–	4	–	0
Cincinnati	3	–	4	–	0	5	–	4	–	0
Ohio Wesleyan	3	–	3	–	0	4	–	5	–	0
Kenyon	1	–	6	–	0	3	–	6	–	0
Akron	1	–	6	–	0	1	–	7	–	1
Wittenberg	0	–	4	–	1	3	–	5	–	1
Mount Union	0	–	5	–	0	3	–	7	–	0
Baldwin–Wallace	0	–	0	–	0	0	–	0	–	0
Ohio State *	3	–	0	–	0	5	–	1	–	1
$ – Conference champion; * – did not complete for championship

The 1915 Ohio State Buckeyes football team represented Ohio State University as a member of the Western Conference and the Ohio Athletic Conference (OAC) during the 1915 college football season. Led by third-year head coach, John Wilce, the Buckeyes compiled an overall record of 5–1–1 and outscored opponents 105–39. Ohio State had a record of 2–1–1 against Western Conference opponents and 3–0 in OAC play.

== Schedule ==
Date	Opponent	Site	Result	Attendance
October 2	Ohio Wesleyan	Ohio Field; Columbus, OH	W 19–6	
October 9	Case	Ohio Field; Columbus, OH	W 14–0	
October 16	Illinois	Ohio Field; Columbus, OH (rivalry)	T 3–3	6,634
October 23	at Wisconsin	Randall Field; Madison, WI	L 0–21	
November 6	Indiana	Ohio Field; Columbus, OH	W 10–9	
November 13	Oberlin	Ohio Field; Columbus, OH	W 25–0	
November 20	at Northwestern	Northwestern Field; Evanston, IL	W 34–0	

== Coaching staff ==
- John Wilce, head coach, third year
