= Bart Macomber =

American football player (1894–1971)

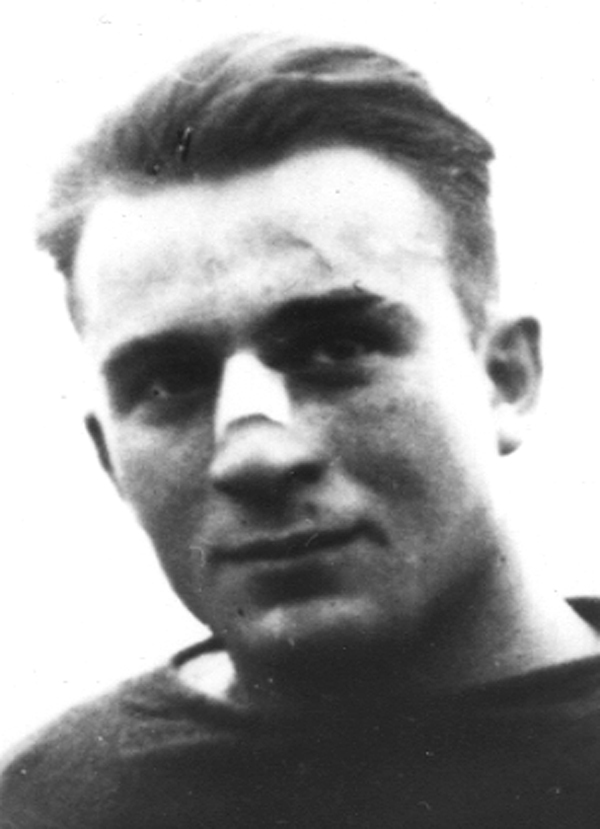

Profile
- Position: Halfback

Personal information
- Born: September 4, 1894; Chicago, Illinois, U.S.
- Died: December 19, 1971 (aged 77); Woodburn, Oregon, U.S.

Career information
- High school: Oak Park High School
- College: Illinois

Career history

Playing
- 1917: Youngstown Patricians
- 1919: Canton Vets

Coaching
- 1926: Oakland Oaks

Awards and highlights
- Consensus All-American (1915); 2× First-team All-Western (1915, 1916)
- College Football Hall of Fame

Other information
- Military career
- Allegiance: United States
- Branch: U.S. Army
- Service years: 1918–1919
- Conflicts: World War I

Franklin Bart Macomber (September 4, 1894 – December 19, 1971) was an American football player. He played halfback and quarterback for the University of Illinois from 1914 to 1916 and helped the school to its first national football championship and consecutive undefeated seasons in 1914 and 1915. He later played professional football for the Canton Bulldogs and Youngstown Patricians. He was also the coach and owner of the Oakland Oaks in the Pacific Coast professional football league founded in 1926. He was elected to the College Football Hall of Fame in 1972.

== Biography ==
=== Early years at Oak Park ===
A native of Oak Park, Illinois. His father, Frank Macomber, had once been the mayor of Oak Park. Macomber played high school football for Hall of Fame coach Bob Zuppke at Oak Park High School. Macomber played on three consecutive undefeated teams at Oak Park and once kicked 16 extra points in a single game against Chicago Englewood in October 1911. At Oak Park, Macomber set state high school records for most extra points in a career (114 from 1910 to 1912) and a season (55 in 1912). His records were not broken for more than 70 years. In 1911, Zuppke persuaded the team from St. John's of Danvers, Massachusetts, one of the top high school teams in the east, to travel to Chicago for what was billed as a match for the "national interscholastic football title." Oak Park won the game 17–0, and the Chicago Daily News reported: "The winners outclassed the eastern men using open style of football. The visitors played the old style football, hammering Oak Park's line on nearly every play … [while] Macomber used the forward pass combined with trick formations with great success." Zuppke's Oak Park team was considered one of the best in the country, and he scheduled several other intersectional games, all of which were won by Oak Park. The scores of the intersectional games played by Zuppke and Macomber follow:

- December 26, 1910: Oak Park defeats Wenatchee (Seattle), 22–0
- December 31, 1910: Oak Park defeats Washington (Portland), 6–3
- December 2, 1911: Oak Park defeats St John's (Danvers, Mass), 17–0
- November 30, 1912: Oak Park defeats Everett (Mass), 32–14

When Zuppke was hired as head coach at the University of Illinois, Macomber followed Zuppke and enrolled at Illinois.

=== Football player at Illinois ===
Macomber played halfback and quarterback at Illinois from 1914 to 1916. He helped the Illini to the school's first national championship in 1914 and consecutive undefeated seasons in 1914 and 1915. The 1914 team allowed only 22 total points during an undefeated 7–0 season. Macomber was selected as a first-team All-American in 1915. In naming Macomber to his All-American team, Walter Camp praised Macomber's "kicking and field generalship." Macomber was elected captain of the 1916 Illinois team. He played halfback for the Illini in 1914 and 1915 before switching to quarterback in 1916. Macomber also handled kicking duties at Illinois.

At the end of the 1916 season, Macomber was selected by Walter Eckersall as the All-Big Ten Conference quarterback. Eckersall wrote of Macomber:

"Bart Macomber, leader of the University of Illinois eleven, is selected to play quarterback and to act as captain of the All-Conference eleven. He is one of the best players who has worn an Illinois uniform in years. It was largely through his efforts, offensively and defensively, that the Illini have held a commanding position in Conference football for the last three years. Macomber is one of the most dependable kickers who has represented a Conference eleven in years. He can punt for an average of forty-five yards, kick goals from the fleld either by placement or drop kick, and is sure on kicking goals after touchdowns. … The Illinois captain has been a factor in all games played by the Zuppke eleven this year. In the Ohio State game, in which his eleven was beaten, 7 to 6, he kicked two goals from the fleld. In the Minnesota game, which resulted in an unexpected victory Macomber was the one player who brought victory to his team. His forward passing and stellar defensive play hardly could have been improved upon."

Macomber was also selected in 1916 as a second-team All-American quarterback by Eckersall and sports writer, Paul Purman, and as a first-team All-American quarterback by Michigan coach Fielding H. Yost.

=== The "greatest football upset of all time" ===
Zuppke and Macomber combined for five undefeated seasons, three at Oak Park High School (1910–1912) and two at Illinois (1914–1915). However, in Macomber's senior year, the Illini lost three games to Colgate, Ohio State and Chicago. Late in the 1916 season, Illinois was scheduled to play the west's top team, the University of Minnesota. Minnesota had beaten Iowa 67–0, Wisconsin 54–0, and Chicago (a team that beat Illinois) 49–0. Before the game, sports writer Ring Lardner published a letter to Zuppke urging him to stay in Chicago and see a play. Lardner joked that "the lucky players were those on crutches, since they would not have to face the northern monster." Macomber later recalled Zuppke's pre-game strategy as follows:

"We began practicing. We were so nervous and upset we could not even hang onto the ball. Coach Bob soon saw that the whole effort was useless. He was afraid it would only demoralize us for the next day. So he called practice off. He waited a bit for full attention and said, 'If you are going to be slaughtered tomorrow, you might as well break training and have a good time tonight.' He told us to try to relax, to eat and drink whatever we liked, maybe see a show. We trooped back to our hotel, the Radisson. The whole squad of 25, including coaching staff, napped and idled the afternoon away. That evening we went on the town. No one counted the drinks or the beers. We ate large dinners and moved the celebration over to a burlesque house. There was no bed check."

According to a 1964 account of the game published by Sports Illustrated, Macomber called for a spread formation against Minnesota, "employed in this game for the first time by any team." Operating out of the formation, Macomber ran for a touchdown and kicked the extra point. After taking a 14–0 lead in the first half, Zuppke told quarterback Macomber to run out the clock in the second half:

"Zup had told me to stall as much and as long as I could get away with it. … I killed all the time I could as those angry fans screamed at me with time running out. My shoes needed tieing, one, then the other. Shoulder pads wanted adjusting, or something was wrong with the way they were laced. I miscalled signals a few times. The whistle was blown on me twice, each time for a five-yard penalty. The stalling rules then were not too strict."

Illinois hung on to the lead and won the upset victory by a score of 14–9. The result was for many years "generally accepted as the greatest football upset of all time." After the game, one Chicago newspaper published this headline: "We Don't Believe It!" NEA sports editor Harry Grayson noted that Macomber had been "prominent in college dramatics," and wrote that he "never acted more than during the last quarter of Illinons' astounding 14–9 victory over Minnesota in 1916." According to Grayson's account, "Macomber untied his shoes, broke the string on his shoulder pads, lost his headgear, miscalled signals —- anything to kill time. It easily was his greatest role as an actor."

=== Professional football, vaudeville and military service ===
After Illinois' 1916 win over Minnesota, one book indicates that Macomber "left school for the Orpheum vaudeville circuit." A March 1917 advertisement for the Orpheum vaudeville show appearing in Madison, Wisconsin promoted appearances by Kenneth Loane, Hoyt's Minstrels, and "Bart Macomber, The Famous Halfback in SONGS & STORIES."

Macomber also went on to play professional football with the Youngstown Patricians in 1917. In 1917, he played halfback for a Youngstown team that included multiple college all-stars, including Tommy Hughitt of Michigan, Tom Gormley of Georgetown, and Freeman Fitzgerald, Bill Kelleher, Gil Ward and Stan Cofall of Notre Dame.

Macomber also served as a lieutenant in the U.S. Army during World War I. In 1919, Macomber played for a team in Canton, Ohio known as the Canton Vets, made up entirely of players who were veterans of the World War.

In 1926, Macomber was the owner, coach, and director of the Oakland Oaks in the newly formed Pacific Coast Professional Football League. Macomber's team, the first professional football team in Oakland, was short-lived playing only five games as follows:

- November 7, 1926: 0–10 loss to the Hollywood Generals, played at Oakland Baseball Park with 4,000 in attendance
- November 14, 1926: 3–0 win over the San Francisco Tigers, played at Ewing Field in San Francisco
- November 21, 1926: 10–9 win over the Los Angeles Angels, played at Oakland Baseball Park with 1,200 in attendance
- December 5, 1926: 23–7 win over the San Francisco Tigers played at Oakland Baseball Park with 3,000 in attendance
- December 12, 1926: 0–7 loss to the Hollywood Generals, played at Wrigley Field in Los Angeles

=== Later life ===
After retiring from football, Macomber moved to Portland, Oregon. Macomber died in Oregon in 1971 and was posthumously inducted the following year into the College Football Hall of Fame.
