= 1915 Minnesota Golden Gophers football team =

American college football season

1915 Minnesota Golden Gophers football

National champion (Billingsley) Western Conference co-champion
- Conference: Western Conference
- Record: 6–0–1 (3–0–1 Western)
- Head coach: Henry L. Williams (16th season)
- Captain: Bernie Bierman
- Home stadium: Northrop Field

1915 Western Conference football standings
	Conf.					Overall
Team	W		L		T	W		L		T
Minnesota +	3	–	0	–	1	6	–	0	–	1
Illinois +	3	–	0	–	2	5	–	0	–	2
Chicago	4	–	2	–	0	5	–	2	–	0
Ohio State	2	–	1	–	1	5	–	1	–	1
Purdue	2	–	2	–	0	3	–	3	–	1
Wisconsin	2	–	3	–	0	4	–	3	–	0
Iowa	1	–	2	–	0	3	–	4	–	0
Indiana	1	–	3	–	0	3	–	3	–	1
Northwestern	0	–	5	–	0	2	–	5	–	0
+ – Conference co-champions

The 1915 Minnesota Golden Gophers football team represented the University of Minnesota in the 1915 college football season. In their 16th year under head coach Henry L. Williams, the Golden Gophers compiled a 6–0–1 record (3–0–1 against Western Conference opponents), tied for the conference championship, and outscored their opponents by a combined total of 191 to 35. The only setback was a tie with Illinois with whom the Gophers shared the conference championship. The team was retroactively selected as the national champion for 1915 by the Billingsley Report.

End Bert Baston, fullback Bernie Bierman and guard Merton Dunningan were named All-Americans by the Associated Press. Baston was also named an All-American by the Walter Camp Football Foundation and Look Magazine. Baston, Bierman and Dunnigan were named All-Big Ten first team.

== Schedule ==
Date	Opponent	Site	Result	Attendance	Source
October 2	North Dakota*	Northrop Field; Minneapolis, MN	W 41–0	3,000–5,000	
October 9	Iowa State*	Northrop Field; Minneapolis, MN	W 34–6	6,000	
October 16	South Dakota*	Northrop Field; Minneapolis, MN	W 19–0	2,000	
October 23	Iowa	Northrop Field; Minneapolis, MN (rivalry)	W 51–13	6,000	
October 30	at Illinois	Illinois Field; Champaign, IL	T 6–6	11,553	
November 13	Chicago	Northrop Field; Minneapolis, MN	W 20–7	20,000	
November 20	at Wisconsin	Randall Field; Madison, WI (rivalry)	W 20–3	13,500	
*Non-conference game

== Roster ==
- HB Bernie Bierman
- E Bert Baston
- Francis "Frank" Moudry
