= Jack Watson (American football) =

American football player and coach, military officer (1893–1963)

Biographical details
- Born: July 11, 1893; DeKalb, Illinois, U.S.
- Died: January 4, 1963 (aged 69); Alamogordo, New Mexico, U.S.

Playing career
- 1913–1915: Illinois
- Position: Center

Coaching career (HC unless noted)
- 1916–1917: Utah Agricultural

Head coaching record
- Overall: 8–5–2

Accomplishments and honors

Awards
- All-American (1915); First-team All-Western (1915)

John Wesley Watson (July 11, 1893 – January 4, 1963) was an American college football player and coach. He served as the head football coach at Utah State University from 1916 to 1917, compiling a record of 8–5–2.

Watson later served as an intelligence officer in the United States Army. He retired a major, having worked under the command of Claire Lee Chennault. Watson died of a heart attack, on January 4, 1963, in Alamogordo, New Mexico.

== Head coaching record ==
Year	Team	Overall	Conference	Standing	Bowl/playoffs
Utah Agricultural Aggies (Rocky Mountain Conference) (1916–1917)
1916	Utah Agricultural	1–5–1	0–3	8th	
1917	Utah Agricultural	7–0–1	4–0–1	2nd	
Utah Agricultural:		8–5–2	4–3		
Total:		8–5–2			
