= 1915 Indiana Hoosiers football team =

American college football season

1915 Indiana Hoosiers football
- Conference: Western Conference
- Record: 3–3–1 (1–3 Western)
- Head coach: Clarence Childs (2nd season)
- Captain: Frank Whitaker
- Home stadium: Jordan Field

1915 Western Conference football standings
| | Conf. | | | | | Overall |
| Team | W | | L | | T | W | | L | | T |
|---|---|---|---|---|---|---|---|---|---|---|
| Minnesota + | 3 | – | 0 | – | 1 | 6 | – | 0 | – | 1 |
| Illinois + | 3 | – | 0 | – | 2 | 5 | – | 0 | – | 2 |
| Chicago | 4 | – | 2 | – | 0 | 5 | – | 2 | – | 0 |
| Ohio State | 2 | – | 1 | – | 1 | 5 | – | 1 | – | 1 |
| Purdue | 2 | – | 2 | – | 0 | 3 | – | 3 | – | 1 |
| Wisconsin | 2 | – | 3 | – | 0 | 4 | – | 3 | – | 0 |
| Iowa | 1 | – | 2 | – | 0 | 3 | – | 4 | – | 0 |
| Indiana | 1 | – | 3 | – | 0 | 3 | – | 3 | – | 1 |
| Northwestern | 0 | – | 5 | – | 0 | 2 | – | 5 | – | 0 |
+ – Conference co-champions

The 1915 Indiana Hoosiers football team was an American football team that represented Indiana University Bloomington during the 1915 college football season. In their second season under head coach Clarence Childs, the Hoosiers compiled a 3–3–1 record and finished in eighth place in the Western Conference. Jim Thorpe, Sac and Fox Nation citizen and first Native American to win gold for the United States in the Olympics, worked as assistant coach for the 1915 Indiana Hoosiers football team. Thorpe coached the backfield and kickers. The team won games against DePauw (7–0), Miami (OH) (41–0), and Northwestern (14–6), tied with Washington and Lee (7–7), and lost to Chicago (13–7), Ohio State (10–9), and Purdue (7–0).

== Schedule ==
| Date | Opponent | Site | Result | Attendance | Source |
|---|---|---|---|---|---|
| October 2 | DePauw* | Jordan Field; Bloomington, IN | W 7–0 | | |
| October 9 | Miami (OH)* | Jordan Field; Bloomington, IN | W 41–0 | | |
| October 16 | at Chicago | Stagg Field; Chicago, IL | L 7–13 | > 10,000 | |
| October 30 | vs. Washington and Lee* | Washington Field; Indianapolis, IN | T 7–7 | 8,500 | |
| November 6 | at Ohio State | Ohio Field; Columbus, OH | L 9–10 | | |
| November 13 | at Northwestern | Northwestern Field; Evanston, IL | W 14–6 | | |
| November 20 | Purdue | Jordan Field; Bloomington, IN (rivalry) | L 0–7 | | |
*Non-conference game

== Personnel ==
=== Roster ===
| Name | Position | Year | Ref. |
|---|---|---|---|
| Buschman, Charles Severin | | | |
| Wray | | | |
| Crosby | | | |
| Allen, Frank Emerson | LE | | |
| Ewing | | | |
| Wiley | | | |
| Davenport | | | |
| Knachel | | | |
| Lindsey | | | |
| Wiley, H. C. | | | |
| Smith | | | |
| Jacobs | | | |
| Whinnery | | | |
| McCoy, Emil Wilton | LE | | |
| Marshall | | | |
| Pope, Spencer Gordon | E | Freshman | |
| Hathaway, Russel Grant | T-G | | |
| Owens, Arnet Harvey | | | |
| Conkle, Frederick Allen | | | |
| Stutesman, Frank M. | | | |
| Landis | | | |
| Springer | | | |
| Bowser | | | |
| Peckinpaugh, Earl Martin | | | |
| Rogers | | | |
| Mullett, DeWitt Talmage | | | |
| Turner, Howard K. | | | |
| Gray, Harry P. | | | |
| Bonsib, Louis William | | | |
| McIntosh, Freal Hildreth "Mac" | FB | | |
| Prather, Clinton Charner | RT/LT | | |
| Matthews, Walter Norbet | RE | | |
| Whitaker, Frank Berkett (C) | QB | | |
| Voss, Walter C. F. | C | | |
| Scott, Clair Hudson | RH/LH | | |
| Shonkwiler, Fred Anges | | | |
| Wallace | | | |
| Redmon, John Thomas | LG/RG | | |
| Welland, Paul Henry | RG/LG | | |
| Erehart, Archie Dean | LH/RH | | |
| Murchie, Lewis Keith | LT/RT | | |

1915 Indiana Hoosiers football coaches, captain

=== Staff ===
- Head coach, Clarence C. Childs
- Assistant coach, Jim Thorpe
- Jake Buskirk
- Ira Coleman Batman
- Jesse Ferguson, trainer
