= 1915 All-America college football team =

Official list of the best college football players of 1915

The 1915 All-America college football team is composed of college football players who were selected as All-Americans for the 1915 college football season. The only selectors for the 1915 season who have been recognized as "official" by the National Collegiate Athletic Association (NCAA) are Walter Camp, whose selections were published in Collier's Weekly, and the International News Service (INS), a newswire founded by William Randolph Hearst.

Although not recognized by the NCAA, many other sports writers, newspapers, and coaches selected All-America teams in 1915. They include Parke H. Davis, Walter Eckersall, and Fielding H. Yost.

== All-Americans of 1915 ==
=== Ends ===
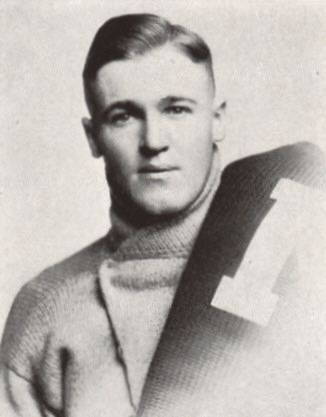
Nebraska's Guy Chamberlain

- **Murray Shelton**, Cornell (College Football Hall of Fame) (WC-1; FM-2; MON-2; PD-1; TC-1; DR; ER)
- **Guy Chamberlin**, Nebraska (College and Pro Football Hall of Fame) (WE-1; FM-1; PD-1)
- **Bert Baston**, Minnesota (College and Pro Football Hall of Fame) (WC-1; WE-2)
- **Bob Higgins**, Penn State (College Football Hall of Fame) (WC-2; WE-2; FM-1; FY-1; MON-1; TC-1; JI)
- Jack "Red" Lamberton, Princeton (WE-1; FY-1)
- Fred Heyman, Washington & Jefferson (WC-3; MON-1)
- George Squier, Illinois (WC-3; FM-2)
- Ernest William Soucy, Harvard (MON-2; DR; ER; JI)
- James P. Herron, Pittsburgh (WC-2)

=== Tackles ===
- **Howard "Cub" Buck**, Wisconsin (WC-2; WE-1; FM-1; FY-1; PD-1; TC-1)
- **Joseph Gilman**, Harvard (WC-1; WE-1; FY-1; MON-2; TC-1; DR; ER; JI)
- Earl Abell, Colgate (College Football Hall of Fame) (WC-1; WE-2; FM-2; MON-1)
- Maurice M. Witherspoon, W&J (FM-1)
- Mark Farnum, Brown (MON-1; ER)
- Laurens Shull, Chicago (died in WWI) (FM-2)
- Alex Weyand, Army (College Football Hall of Fame) (WC-3; MON-2)
- William T. Van de Graaff, Alabama (WC-2; PD-1)
- Nelson "Pie" Way, Yale (DR; JI)
- John B. McAuliffe, Dartmouth (WE-2)
- Josh Cody, Vanderbilt (WC-3)

=== Guards ===
- **Clarence Spears**, Dartmouth (College Football Hall of Fame) (WC-1; WE-1; FM-1; FY-1; MON-1; PD-1; TC-1; DR; ER)
- **Harold White**, Syracuse (WE-2; FM-1; MON-2; TC-1; JI)
- Chris Schlachter, Syracuse (WC-1; WE-2; FY-1; ER)
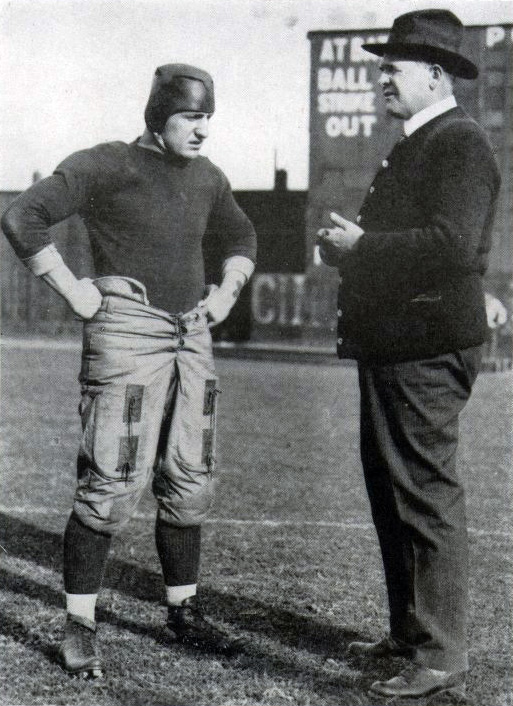
  Pitt center Bob Peck with Hall of Fame football coach "Pop" Warner
- Clinton Black, Yale (WC-2; MON-1; DR)
- Freeman Fitzgerald, Notre Dame (FM-2; PD-1)
- Pat Dunnigan, Minnesota (WE-1; FM-2)
- Budge Garrett, Rutgers (MON-2)
- Frank T. Hogg, Princeton (WC-2; JI)
- Harrie Holland Dadmun, Harvard (WC-3)
- Baby Taylor, Auburn (WC-3)

=== Centers ===
- **Bob Peck**, Pittsburgh (College Football Hall of Fame) (WC-1; FM-1; MON-1; PD-1; TC-1; JI)
- Gib Cool, Cornell (WC-2; WE-1; FM-2; FY-1; ER)
- John McEwan, Army (WC-3; MON-2; DR)
- John Wesley "Jack" Watson, Illinois (WE-2)

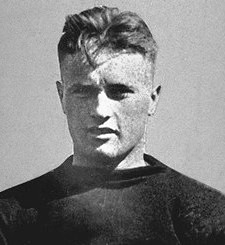
Cornell's Charley Barrett.

=== Quarterbacks ===
- **Charley Barrett**, Cornell (College Football Hall of Fame) (WC-1; WE-1; FM-1; FY-1; MON-1; PD-1; TC-1; DR; ER; JI [hb])
- Guy Williamson, Pittsburgh (JI)
- Donald Clarke Watson, Harvard (WC-2)
- Pete Russell, Chicago (WC-3; WE-2; FM-2)
- Miller, Columbia (MON-2)

=== Halfbacks ===
- **Richard King**, Harvard (WC-1; WE-2; FY-1)
- **Bart Macomber**, Illinois (College Football Hall of Fame) (WC-1)
- Elmer Oliphant, Army (WC-1; MON-1; DR)
- **Eugene Mayer**, Virginia (FM-1; PD-1)
- Bernie Bierman, Minnesota (College Football Hall of Fame) (WE-1; FM-2 [fb])
- **Neno DaPrato**, Michigan State (FM-1)
- Dave Tibbott, Princeton (WC-2; WE-1; FY-1)
- Red Wilkinson, Syracuse (WE-2 [fb]; MON-1; ER)
- Fritz Shiverick, Cornell (DR)
- R. B. "Dick" Rutherford, Nebraska (FM-2)
- Andy Hastings, Pittsburgh (FM-2)
- John Maulbetsch, Michigan (College Football Hall of Fame) (WE-2; MON-2; TC-1)
- Johnny Gilroy, Georgetown (MON-2)
- Anderson, Colgate (TC-1)
- Herman Abraham, Oregon State (WC-3)

=== Fullbacks ===
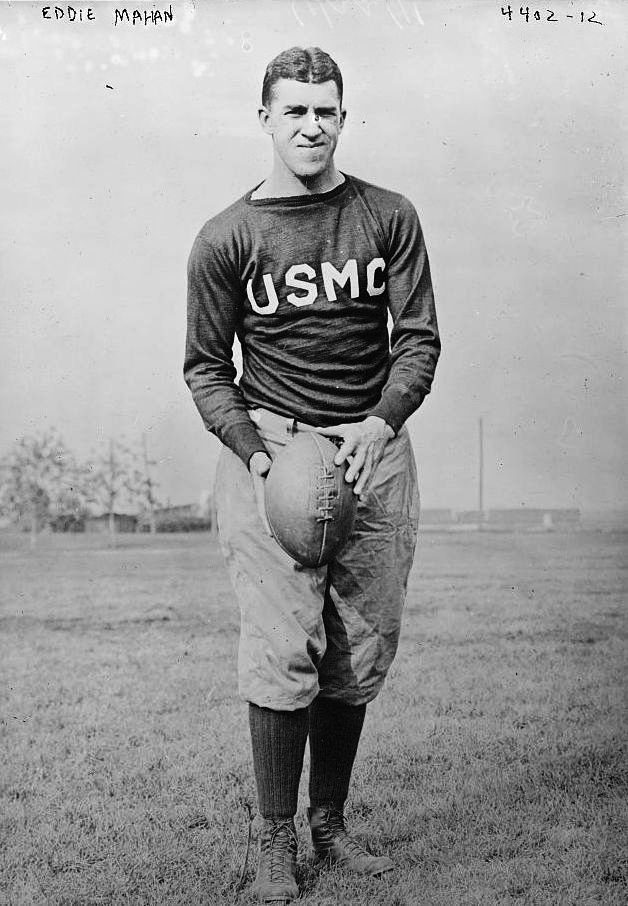
Harvard's three-time All-American fullback Eddie Mahan was rated by Jim Thorpe as the best player he ever faced.

- **Eddie Mahan**, Harvard (College Football Hall of Fame) (WC-1; WE-1; FM-1; FY-1; MON-1; PD-1 [hb]; TC-1; DR; ER; JI)
- Edward H. Driggs, Princeton (PD-1)
- Howard Parker Talman, Rutgers (WC-2; MON-2)
- Punk Berryman, Penn State (WC-3; ER [hb]; JI [hb])

=== Key ===
NCAA recognized selectors for 1915

- WC = Collier's Weekly as selected by Walter Camp
- FM = Frank G. Menke, Sporting Editor of the International News Service

Other selectors

- WE = Walter Eckersall, of the Chicago Tribune
- FY = Fielding Yost, coach of the University of Michigan
- MON = Monty, New York sports writer Monty
- PD = Parke H. Davis
- TC = Tommy Clark
- DR = Damon Runyon. At the end of the 1915 season, Runyon noted the difficulty in picking an All-America team when most of those doing so had only seen a fraction of the players. Accordingly, Runyon chose not to call his list and All-America team, instead calling it his All-"Guys-We've-Seen" team.
- ER = Eddie N. Robinson, head coach of the Brown Bears football team.
- JI = Jonas H. Ingram, head coach of the Navy football team.

Bold = Consensus All-American

- 1 – First-team selection
- 2 – Second-team selection
- 3 – Third-team selection

== See also ==
- 1915 All-Big Ten Conference football team
- 1915 All-Southern college football team
- 1915 All-Western college football team
