= 1915 Southwest Conference football season =

- Sport: Football
- Duration: September 25 – November 27, 1915
- Teams: 8
- Champion: Oklahoma

SWC seasons
- 1916 →

1915 Southwest Conference football standings
	Conf.					Overall
Team	W		L		T	W		L		T
Oklahoma $	3	–	0	–	0	10	–	0	–	0
Baylor	3	–	0	–	0	7	–	1	–	0
Texas A&M	1	–	1	–	0	6	–	2	–	0
Texas	2	–	2	–	0	6	–	3	–	0
Arkansas	1	–	1	–	0	4	–	2	–	1
Rice	1	–	2	–	0	5	–	3	–	0
Oklahoma A&M	0	–	3	–	0	4	–	5	–	1
Southwestern (TX)	0	–	2	–	0	4	–	3	–	0
Baylor forfeited claim to co-champion for using ineligible player.

The 1915 Southwest Conference football season was the first season of college football played by the member schools of the Southwest Conference (SWC) and was a part of the 1915 college football season. Oklahoma compiled a 10–0–0 record, with a conference record of 3–0–0, and was the inaugural SWC champion. Baylor finished in second place with an overall record of 7–1–0, and a conference record of 3–0–0, they would have been crowned co-champion but forfeited the claim due to the use of an ineligible player.

== Results and team statistics ==
Conf. rank	Team	Head coach	Overall record	Conf. record	PPG	PAG
1	Oklahoma	Bennie Owen	10–0–0 (1.000)	3–0–0 (1.000)	37.0	5.4
2	Baylor	Charles Mosley	7–1–0 (.875)	3–0–0 (1.000)	23.5	2.8
3	Texas	Dave Allerdice	6–3–0 (.667)	2–2–0 (.500)	37.2	7.7
4	Texas A&M	Edwin Harlan	6–2–0 (.750)	1–1–0 (.500)	22.8	4.3
5	Arkansas	T. T. McConnell	4–2–1 (.643)	1–1–0 (.500)	17.3	7.9
6	Rice	Philip Arbuckle	5–3–0 (.625)	1–2–0 (.333)	15.3	17.9
7	Oklahoma A&M	John G. Griffith	4–5–1 (.450)	0–3–0 (.000)	16.1	9.3
8	Southwestern	J. Burton Rix	4–3–0 (.571)	0–2–0 (.000)	7.2	13.7

Key
PPG = Average of points scored per game
PAG = Average of points allowed per game

== Schedules ==
Index to colors and formatting
Non-conference matchup; SWC member won
Non-conference matchup; SWC member lost
Non-conference matchup; tie
SWC teams in **bold**

=== Week One ===
Date	Visiting team	Home team	Site	Result	Attendance	Reference
September 25	Kingfisher	**Oklahoma**	Boyd Field • Norman, OK	**W** 67–0		

=== Week Two ===
Date	Visiting team	Home team	Site	Result	Attendance	Reference
October 1	Austin	**Texas A&M**	Kyle Field • College Station, TX	**W** 40–0		
October 2	**Oklahoma**	Southwestern Oklahoma	Weatherford, OK	**W** 55–0		
October 2	Howard Payne	**Baylor**	Carroll Field • Waco, TX	**W** 3–0		
October 2	TCU	**Texas**	Clark Field • Austin, TX	**W** 72–0		
October 2	Hendrix	**Arkansas**	The Hill • Fayetteville, AR	**W** 41–0		
October 2	Trinity (TX)	**Rice**	Rice Field • Houston, TX	**W** 46–0		
October 2	**Oklahoma A&M**	Missouri	Rollins Field • Columbia, MO	**L** 6–13		

=== Week Three ===
Date	Visiting team	Home team	Site	Result	Attendance	Reference
October 8	**Baylor**	Rice	Rice Field • Houston, TX	**BAY** 26–0		
October 8	Trinity (TX)	Texas A&M	Kyle Field • College Station, TX	**W** 62–0		
October 8	Friends	Oklahoma A&M	Lewis Field • Stillwater, OK	**W** 6–0		
October 9	Northwestern Oklahoma State	Oklahoma	Boyd Field • Norman, OK	**W** 102–0		
October 9	Daniel Baker	Texas	Clark Field • Austin, TX	**W** 92–0		
October 9	Ouachita Baptist	Arkansas	The Hill • Fayetteville, AR	**W** 12–7		

=== Week Four ===
Date	Visiting team	Home team	Site	Result	Attendance	Reference
October 12	Hendrix	**Southwestern**	Snyder Field • Georgetown, TX	**W** 3–0		
October 15	**Texas A&M**	TCU	Y. M. C. A. Athletic Park • Fort Worth, TX	**W** 13–10		
October 15	Kendall	**Oklahoma A&M**	Lewis Field • Stillwater, OK	**T** 0–0		
October 16	**Oklahoma**	Missouri	Rollins Field • Columbia, MO	**W** 24–0		
October 16	Trinity (TX)	**Baylor**	Fair Park • Dallas, TX	**W** 49–0		
October 16	**Rice**	**Texas**	Clark Field • Austin, TX	**UT** 59–0		

=== Week Five ===
Date	Visiting team	Home team	Site	Result	Attendance	Reference
October 22	Missouri Mines	**Texas A&M**	Kyle Field • College Station, TX	**W** 33–3		
October 23	**Oklahoma**	**Texas**	Fair Park Stadium • Dallas, TX	**OU** 14–13	12,000	
October 23	**Baylor**	**Southwestern**	Snyder Field • Georgetown, TX	**BAY** 10–0		
October 23	Daniel Baker	**Rice**	West End Park • Houston, TX	**W** 28–0		
October 23	**Oklahoma A&M**	**Arkansas**	League Park • Fort Smith, AR	**ARK** 14–9	3,500	

=== Week Six ===
Date	Visiting team	Home team	Site	Result	Attendance	Reference
October 29	Baker	**Oklahoma A&M**	Lewis Field • Stillwater, OK	**W** 30–7		
October 30	Kansas	**Oklahoma**	Boyd Field • Norman, OK	**W** 23–14		
October 30	**Southwestern**	**Texas**	Clark Field • Austin, TX	**UT** 45–0		
October 30	Haskell	**Texas A&M**	Fair Park • Dallas, TX	**W** 21–7	8,000	
October 30	**Arkansas**	Saint Louis	Sportsman's Park • St. Louis, MO	**T** 0–0		
October 30	TCU	**Rice**	Rice Field • Houston, TX	**W** 33–3		

=== Week Seven ===
Date	Visiting team	Home team	Site	Result	Attendance	Reference
November 5	Northwestern Territorial Normal	**Oklahoma A&M**	Lewis Field • Stillwater, OK	**W** 77–0		
November 6	**Oklahoma**	Kendall	Association Park • Tulsa, OK	**W** 14–13		
November 6	Sewanee	**Texas**	West End Park • Houston, TX	**W** 27–6		
November 6	**Arkansas**	LSU	State Fair Grounds • Shreveport, LA	**L** 7–13		
November 6	Daniel Baker	**Southwestern**	Snyder Field • Georgetown, TX	**W** 15–0		
November 8	Sewanee	**Baylor**	Cotton Palace • Waco, TX	**L** 3–16		
November 8	**Texas A&M**	**Rice**	West End Park • Houston, TX	**RICE** 7–0		

=== Week Eight ===
Date	Visiting team	Home team	Site	Result	Attendance	Reference
November 12	**Southwestern**	TCU	Y. M. C. A. Athletic Park • Fort Worth, TX	**L** 0–21		
November 13	**Oklahoma**	**Arkansas**	The Hill • Fayetteville, AR	**OU** 23–0		
November 13	**Oklahoma A&M**	**Baylor**	Cotton Palace • Waco, TX	**BAY** 12–6		
November 13	Alabama	**Texas**	Clark Field • Austin, TX	**W** 20–0		

=== Week Nine ===
Date	Visiting team	Home team	Site	Result	Attendance	Reference
November 16	**Oklahoma A&M**	TCU	Y. M. C. A. Athletic Park • Fort Worth, TX	**W** 13–0		
November 17	LSU	**Rice**	West End Park • Houston, TX	**W** 6–0		
November 19	**Texas**	**Texas A&M**	Kyle Field • College Station, TX	**TAMU** 13–0	8,000	
November 19	**Oklahoma A&M**	Haskell	Haskell Field • Lawrence, KS	**L** 7–21		
November 19	**Southwestern**	SMU	Dallas, TX	**W** 21–0		
November 19	**Oklahoma**	Kansas State	Ahearn Field • Manhattan, KS	**W** 21–7		
November 20	Daniel Baker	**Baylor**	Cotton Palace • Waco, TX	**W** 34–0		

=== Week Ten ===
Date	Visiting team	Home team	Site	Result	Attendance	Reference
November 25	**Oklahoma A&M**	**Oklahoma**	Oklahoma City, OK	**OU** 26–7	7,000	
November 25	TCU	**Baylor**	Carroll Field • Waco, TX	**W** 51–0		
November 25	Notre Dame	**Texas**	Clark Field • Austin, TX	**L** 7–36		
November 25	Mississippi A&M	**Texas A&M**	Kyle Field • College Station, TX	**L** 0–7		
November 25	Oklahoma Mines	**Arkansas**	The Hill • Fayetteville, AR	**W** 45–0		
November 25	**Southwestern**	Austin	Sherman, TX	**W** 7–6		
November 27	Notre Dame	Rice	West End Park • Houston, TX	**W** 2–55		
