= 1915 Oklahoma Sooners football team =

American college football season

1915 Oklahoma Sooners football
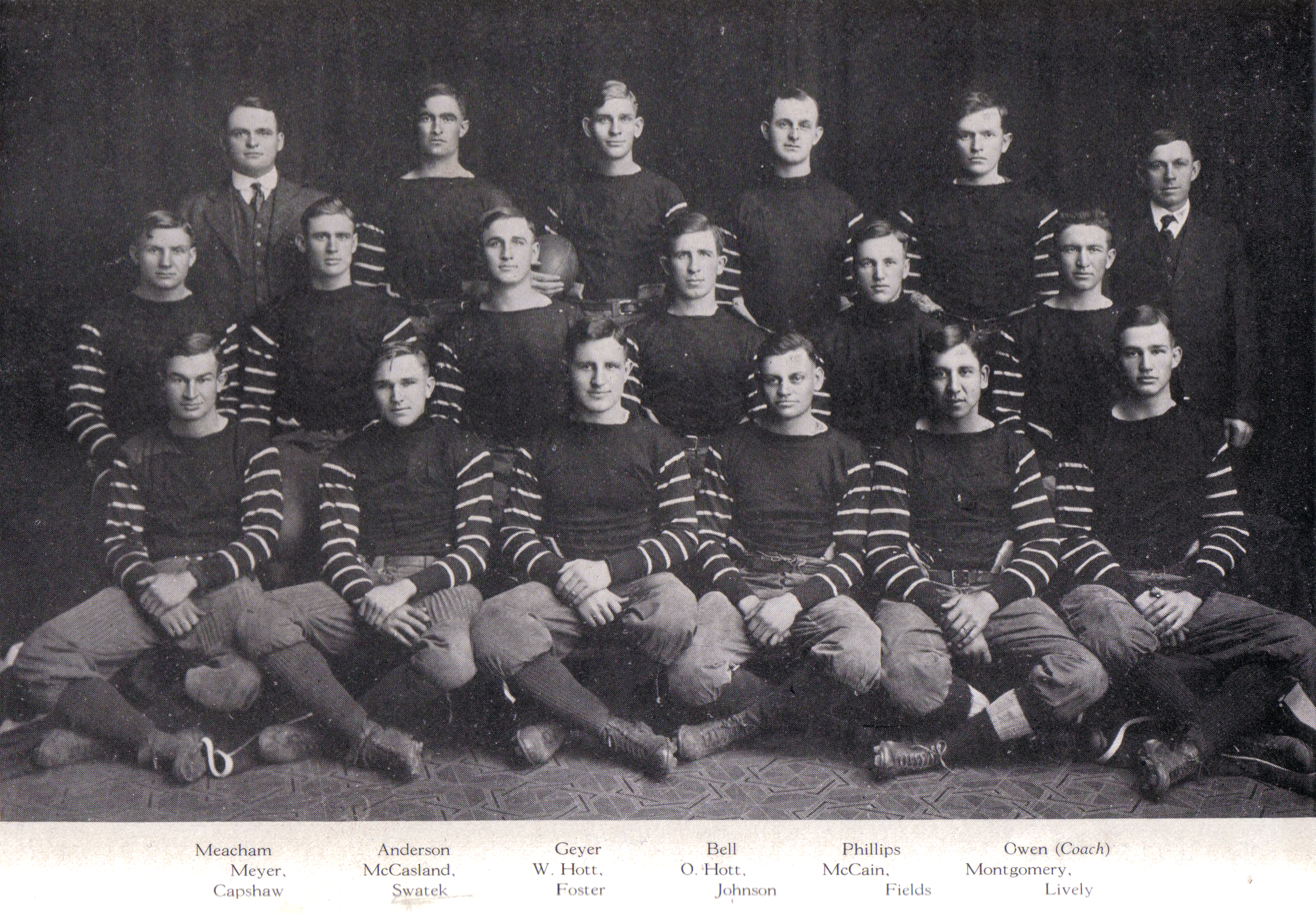

National champion (Billingsley) SWC champion
- Conference: Southwest Conference
- Record: 10–0 (3–0 SWC)
- Head coach: Bennie Owen (11th season)
- Captain: Forest Geyer
- Home stadium: Boyd Field

1915 Southwest Conference football standings
	Conf.					Overall
Team	W		L		T	W		L		T
Oklahoma $	3	–	0	–	0	10	–	0	–	0
Baylor	3	–	0	–	0	7	–	1	–	0
Texas A&M	1	–	1	–	0	6	–	2	–	0
Texas	2	–	2	–	0	6	–	3	–	0
Arkansas	1	–	1	–	0	4	–	2	–	1
Rice	1	–	2	–	0	5	–	3	–	0
Oklahoma A&M	0	–	3	–	0	4	–	5	–	1
Southwestern (TX)	0	–	2	–	0	4	–	3	–	0
Baylor forfeited claim to co-champion for using ineligible player.

The 1915 Oklahoma Sooners football team was an American football team that represented the University of Oklahoma in the Southwest Conference during the 1915 college football season. In their 11th year under head coach Bennie Owen, the Sooners compiled a 10–0 record (3–0 against conference opponents), won the Southwest Conference championship, and outscored their opponents by a combined total of 369 to 54. This was the first season that the Sooners participated in the Southwest Conference.

There was no contemporaneous system in 1915 for determining a national champion. However, Oklahoma was retroactively named as the national champion by the Billingsley Report using its alternate "margin of victory" methodology.

Fullback Forest Geyer was recognized as an All-American. Geyer was inducted into the College Football Hall of Fame in 1973.

Six Sooners received All-Southwest Conference honors: Elmer Capshaw, Forest Geyer, Oliver Hot, Willis Hott, Hap Johnson, and Homer Montgomery.

== Schedule ==
Date	Opponent	Site	Result	Attendance	Source
September 25	Kingfisher*	Boyd Field; Norman, OK	W 67–0		
October 2	at Southwestern Oklahoma*	Weatherford, OK	W 55–0		
October 9	Northwestern Oklahoma State*	Boyd Field; Norman, OK	W 102–0		
October 16	at Missouri*	Rollins Field; Columbia, MO (rivalry)	W 24–0		
October 23	Texas	Fair Park Stadium; Dallas, TX (rivalry)	W 14–13	12,000	
October 30	Kansas*	Boyd Field; Norman, OK	W 23–14		
November 6	at Kendall*	Association Park; Tulsa, OK	W 14–13		
November 13	at Arkansas	The Hill; Fayetteville, AR	W 23–0		
November 19	at Kansas State*	Ahearn Field; Manhattan, KS	W 21–7		
November 25	Oklahoma A&M	Oklahoma City, OK (Bedlam)	W 26–7	7,000	
*Non-conference game

== Roster ==
- George Anderson, T
- Curry Bell, C
- Elmer Capshaw, HB
- William Clark
- Corkle, G
- Edwards, HB
- Fields, E
- Raybourne Foster, HB
- Forest Geyer, FB
- Oliver Hott, T
- Willis Hott, G
- Hap Johnson, QB
- William Lively, HB
- Frank McCain, HB
- T. Howard McCasland, E
- McFerren, E
- Homer Montgomery, E
- Leon Phillips, G
- Charles Swatek, HB
