= 1915 South Dakota State football team =

American college football season

1915 South Dakota State football
- Conference: Independent
- Record: 5–1–1
- Head coach: Harry W. Ewing (4th season)
- Home stadium: State Field

1915 Midwestern college football independents records
	Conf.			Overall
Team	W	L	T	W		L		T
Dubuque		–		7	–	0	–	0
Carleton		–		6	–	0	–	0
Wabash		–		7	–	0	–	1
Notre Dame		–		7	–	1	–	0
Grinnell		–		6	–	1	–	0
Michigan Agricultural		–		5	–	1	–	0
Western State Normal		–		5	–	1	–	0
South Dakota State		–		5	–	1	–	1
Heidelberg		–		5	–	2	–	1
Millikin		–		5	–	2	–	1
Nebraska Wesleyan		–		6	–	3	–	0
St. Mary's (OH)		–		3	–	2	–	0
Michigan State Normal		–		4	–	2	–	1
Doane		–		5	–	3	–	0
Marquette		–		4	–	2	–	2
South Dakota		–		4	–	2	–	2
Jamestown		–		3	–	2	–	1
Penn (IA)		–		4	–	3	–	0
Michigan		–		4	–	3	–	1
Saint Louis		–		4	–	3	–	1
Creighton		–		3	–	3	–	1
Haskell		–		3	–	3	–	0
Iowa State Teachers		–		3	–	3	–	0
North Dakota Agricultural		–		3	–	3	–	0
St. Thomas (MN)		–		2	–	2	–	1
Hanover		–		2	–	4	–	0
Lake Forest		–		2	–	4	–	0
Northern Illinois State		–		2	–	5	–	1
Lawrence		–		2	–	5	–	0
Earlham		–		2	–	6	–	0
Detroit		–		1	–	5	–	0
Butler		–		1	–	6	–	0
Lincoln (MO)		–		0	–	2	–	0

The 1915 South Dakota State football team was an American football team that represented South Dakota State University as an independent during the 1915 college football season. In its fourth season under head coach Harry W. Ewing, the team compiled a 5–1–1 record and outscored opponents by a total of 163 to 7.

== Schedule ==
Date	Opponent	Site	Result	Attendance	Source
October 9	Huron	Brookings, SD	W 39–0		
October 16	at Yankton	Yankton, SD	W 72–0		
October ?	Huron	Brookings, SD	W 25–0		
October 30	at North Dakota	Grand Forks, ND	T 0–0		
November 6	South Dakota	Brookings, SD (rivalry)	L 0–7	5,000	
November 13	vs. North Dakota Agricultural	Watertown, SD (rivalry)	W 21–0		
November 20	Dakota Wesleyan	State Field; Brookings, SD	W 6–0		
