= 1915 Alma Maroon and Cream football team =

American college football season

1915 Alma Maroon and Cream football
- Conference: Michigan Intercollegiate Athletic Association
- Record: 1–3–2 (1–0–2 MIAA)
- Head coach: Wilfred C. Bleamaster (4th season)

1915 Michigan Intercollegiate Athletic Association football standings
	Conf.					Overall
Team	W		L		T	W		L		T
Albion $	4	–	0	–	1	5	–	1	–	1
Alma	1	–	0	–	2	1	–	3	–	2
Olivet	2	–	1	–	2	3	–	3	–	2
Kalamazoo	2	–	2	–	0	3	–	2	–	0
Hillsdale	2	–	3	–	1	3	–	3	–	1
Adrian	0	–	5	–	0	2	–	5	–	0
+ – Conference co-champions

The 1915 Alma Maroon and Cream football team represented Alma College as a member of the Michigan Intercollegiate Athletic Association (MIAA) during the 1915 college football season. Led by Wilfred C. Bleamaster in his fourth and final season as head coach, Alma compiled an overall record of 1–3–2 with a mark of 1–0–2 in conference play, placing second in the MIAA.

== Schedule ==
Date	Time	Opponent	Site	Result	Attendance	Source
October 2		at Notre Dame*	Cartier Field; Notre Dame, IN	L 0–32		
October 9		at Michigan Agricultural*	College Field; East Lansing, MI	L 12–77		
October 16		Hillsdale	Alma, MI	W 20–6		
October 22	3:00 p.m.	at Western State Normal*	Normal athletic field; Kalamazoo, MI	L 0–79	2,500	
October 30		Albion	Alma, MI	T 7–7		
November 13		at Olivet	Olivet, MI	T 7–7		
*Non-conference game
