= William D. Cochran =

American football player (1894–1951)

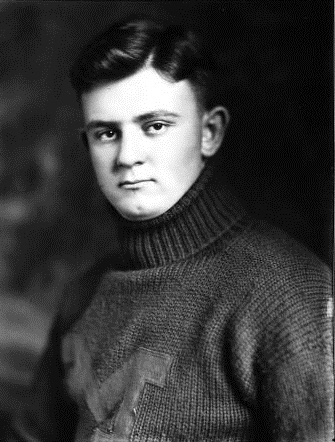
- Cochran, c. 1915

Michigan Wolverines
- Positions: Guard, tackle

Personal information
- Born: March 22, 1894; Houghton, Michigan, U.S.
- Died: December 5, 1951 (aged 57); Iron Mountain, Michigan, U.S.
- Listed height: 5 ft 8 in (1.73 m)
- Listed weight: 235 lb (107 kg)

Career information
- College: Michigan (1913–1915)

Awards and highlights
- 2× All-Western (1914, 1915)

William Duscharme "'Pink Cheeks" Cochran (March 22, 1894 – December 5, 1951) was an American college football player. He played guard and tackle for the University of Michigan from 1913 to 1915. He was a first-team All-Western lineman and the captain of the 1915 Michigan Wolverines football team. He later operated a freight trucking line based in the Upper Peninsula of Michigan. He also served as a director of the Federal Reserve Bank of Minneapolis from 1936 to 1950, including five years as the deputy chairman from 1946 to 1950.

== Early life ==
A native of Houghton in Michigan's Upper Peninsula, Cochran played football at Houghton High School and was the Upper Peninsula shot put and discus champion.

== University of Michigan ==
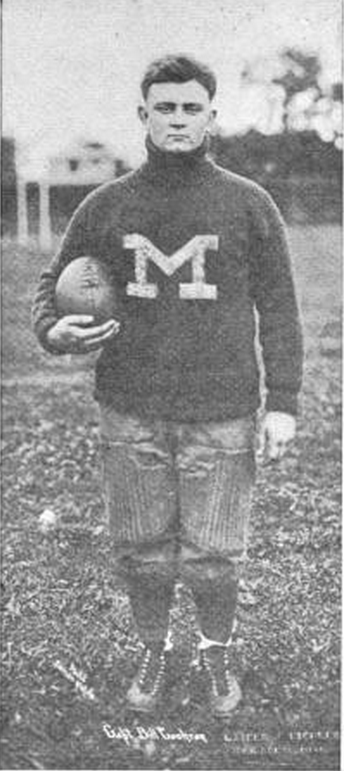
Cochran, c. 1915

Cochran enrolled at the University of Michigan as a student in the College of Pharmacy. While at Michigan, he played as a tackle or guard in every game for Fielding H. Yost's Michigan Wolverines football teams from 1913 to 1915. He was known among his teammates by the nickname "Pink Cheeks."

Playing at the tackle position, Cochran established himself as one of the stars of the 1914 Michigan Wolverines football team. The authors of Spalding's Official Foot Ball Guide dubbed Cochran one of the three stars of the 1914 Michigan team (along with John Maulbetsch and James Raynsford): "Michigan has two other stars in Capt. Raynsford, at center, and Cochran, at tackle. Both big, powerful men, they had the real foot ball intuition and worked wonders with an otherwise green line."

At the end of the 1914 season, Cochran was unanimously elected as the captain of the 1915 Michigan Wolverines football team. The Michigan Alumnus reported: "Michigan's new captain starred on defense all during the season just past, and was also effective in opening up holes for his backs." Cochran was also selected as a 1914 first-team All-Western player by Walter Eckersall in the Chicago Daily Tribune.

In January 1915, newspapers across the country ran a story about the Michigan football captain's inability to defeat his father in a wrestling match. According to the story, Cochran had long hoped to be stout enough to throw his father in a wrestling match. The story continued: "Bill Cochran weighs fifty pounds more than his father and he is at least twenty years younger, but he said today that the wrestling honors of the family will remain secure in the capable hands of the head of the family."

During his senior year, Cochran was 5 feet, 8 inches tall and weighed 235 pounds. Prior to the start of the 1915 season, The Michigan Alumnus commented on his weight gain: "Captain William D. Cochran has been shifted from his old post at tackle into the hole left when McHale completed his three years of play last season. Cochran has increased many pounds in weight since the fall of 1914, and his additional avoirdupois is to be made use of next to the lighter Howe, who will probably play center." Cochran credited ginger ale as the secret to his weight gain.

Cochran also participated in ice hockey and track at Michigan.

== Later life ==
After graduating from Michigan, Cochran returned to the Upper Peninsula. He was the owner of William D. Cochran Freight Lines in Iron Mountain, Michigan, and he also served a director of the Commercial Bank. In 1936, he acquired a motor freight line in Minnesota, extending his operations into Ontonagon, Rockland, Calumet, and nearby towns. In June 1936, he was also named a director of the Federal Reserve Bank of Minneapolis. He served for eight years as a Class C director of the Minneapolis Federal Reserve Bank before being appointed the deputy chairman in 1946. He served as the deputy chairman for five years from 1946 to 1950.

Cochran died on December 5, 1951, at his home in Iron Mountain, Michigan.

In 1998, Cochran was inducted into the Upper Peninsula Sports Hall of Fame.
