= 1915 Michigan State Normal Normalites football team =

American college football season

1915 Michigan State Normal Normalites football
- Conference: Independent
- Record: 4–2–1
- Head coach: Elmer Mitchell (1st season)
- Captain: John B. Hartman

1915 Midwestern college football independents records
	Conf.			Overall
Team	W	L	T	W		L		T
Dubuque		–		7	–	0	–	0
Carleton		–		6	–	0	–	0
Wabash		–		7	–	0	–	1
Notre Dame		–		7	–	1	–	0
Grinnell		–		6	–	1	–	0
Michigan Agricultural		–		5	–	1	–	0
Western State Normal		–		5	–	1	–	0
South Dakota State		–		5	–	1	–	1
Heidelberg		–		5	–	2	–	1
Millikin		–		5	–	2	–	1
Nebraska Wesleyan		–		6	–	3	–	0
St. Mary's (OH)		–		3	–	2	–	0
Michigan State Normal		–		4	–	2	–	1
Doane		–		5	–	3	–	0
Marquette		–		4	–	2	–	2
South Dakota		–		4	–	2	–	2
Jamestown		–		3	–	2	–	1
Penn (IA)		–		4	–	3	–	0
Michigan		–		4	–	3	–	1
Saint Louis		–		4	–	3	–	1
Creighton		–		3	–	3	–	1
Haskell		–		3	–	3	–	0
Iowa State Teachers		–		3	–	3	–	0
North Dakota Agricultural		–		3	–	3	–	0
St. Thomas (MN)		–		2	–	2	–	1
Hanover		–		2	–	4	–	0
Lake Forest		–		2	–	4	–	0
Northern Illinois State		–		2	–	5	–	1
Lawrence		–		2	–	5	–	0
Earlham		–		2	–	6	–	0
Detroit		–		1	–	5	–	0
Butler		–		1	–	6	–	0
Lincoln (MO)		–		0	–	2	–	0

The 1915 Michigan State Normal Normalites football team represented Michigan State Normal College (later renamed Eastern Michigan University) as an independent during the 1915 college football season. The team compiled a record of 4–2–1, shut out five of their seven opponents (including a scoreless tie with the Michigan Wolverines freshman team), and outscored their opponents by a combined total of 154 to 25. John B. Hartman was the team captain.

Elmer Mitchell, formerly a high school coach in Grand Rapids, was hired to coach the school's football team in May 1915. At the start of fall practice, 60 students tried out for the football team, the largest number in school history up to that time. As the team lacked any players weighing 200 pounds or more, coach Mitchell was compelled to build his team around speed.

== Schedule ==
Date	Time	Opponent	Site	Result	Source
October 9		at Assumption (ON)	Windsor, ON	W 33–0	
October 16		at Michigan freshmen	Ann Arbor, MI	T 0–0	
October 23		Detroit	Normal Field; Ypsilanti, MI	W 46–0	
October 30		Hillsdale	Normal Field; Ypsilanti, MI	W 28–0	
November 6	2:15 p.m.	at Western State Normal	Normal athletic field; Kalamazoo, MI	L 0–19	
November 13		Battle Creek Physical Training School	Normal Field; Ypsilanti, MI	W 47–0	
November 20		at Hillsdale	Hillsdale, MI	L 0–6	
