= 1915 Michigan Wolverines football team =

American college football season

1915 Michigan Wolverines football
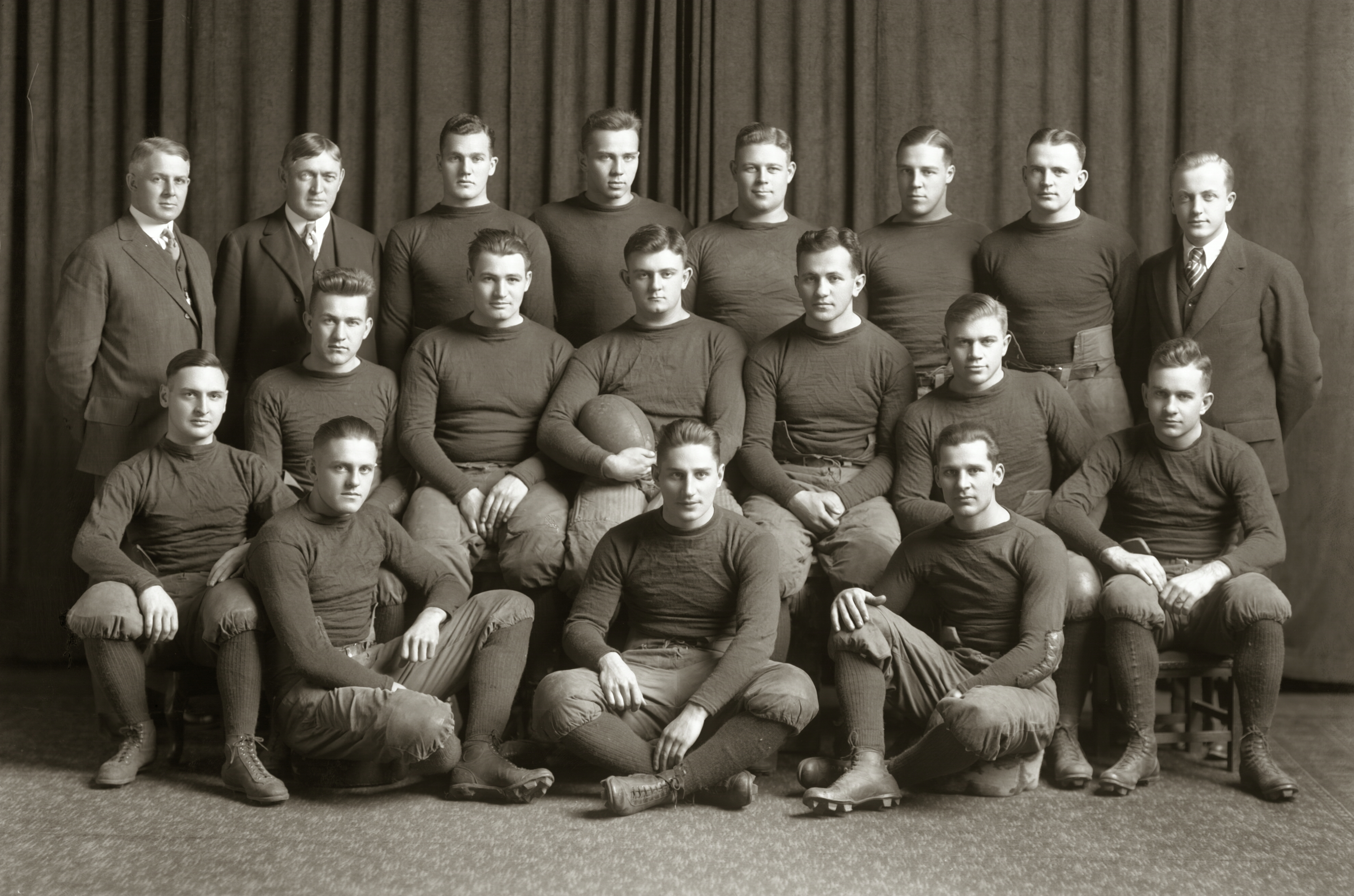
- Conference: Independent
- Record: 4–3–1
- Head coach: Fielding H. Yost (15th season)
- MVP: John Maulbetsch
- Captain: William D. Cochran
- Home stadium: Ferry Field

Uniform
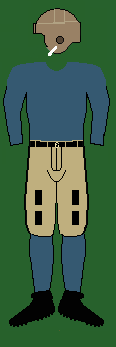

1915 Midwestern college football independents records
	Conf.			Overall
Team	W	L	T	W		L		T
Dubuque		–		7	–	0	–	0
Carleton		–		6	–	0	–	0
Wabash		–		7	–	0	–	1
Notre Dame		–		7	–	1	–	0
Grinnell		–		6	–	1	–	0
Michigan Agricultural		–		5	–	1	–	0
Western State Normal		–		5	–	1	–	0
South Dakota State		–		5	–	1	–	1
Heidelberg		–		5	–	2	–	1
Millikin		–		5	–	2	–	1
Nebraska Wesleyan		–		6	–	3	–	0
St. Mary's (OH)		–		3	–	2	–	0
Michigan State Normal		–		4	–	2	–	1
Doane		–		5	–	3	–	0
Marquette		–		4	–	2	–	2
South Dakota		–		4	–	2	–	2
Jamestown		–		3	–	2	–	1
Penn (IA)		–		4	–	3	–	0
Michigan		–		4	–	3	–	1
Saint Louis		–		4	–	3	–	1
Creighton		–		3	–	3	–	1
Haskell		–		3	–	3	–	0
Iowa State Teachers		–		3	–	3	–	0
North Dakota Agricultural		–		3	–	3	–	0
St. Thomas (MN)		–		2	–	2	–	1
Hanover		–		2	–	4	–	0
Lake Forest		–		2	–	4	–	0
Northern Illinois State		–		2	–	5	–	1
Lawrence		–		2	–	5	–	0
Earlham		–		2	–	6	–	0
Detroit		–		1	–	5	–	0
Butler		–		1	–	6	–	0
Lincoln (MO)		–		0	–	2	–	0

The 1915 Michigan Wolverines football team was an American football team that represented the University of Michigan as an independent during the 1915 college football season. In its 15th season under head coach was Fielding H. Yost the team compiled a 4–3–1 record and outscored opponents by a total of 130 to 81. After winning its first four games, the Wolverines lost three consecutive games.

Right guard William D. Cochran was the team captain. Key players included left halfback John Maulbetsch, quarterback Lawrence Roehm, fullback Cedric C. Smith, center Walter Niemann, and guard Frank Millard. Maulbetch was selected as a first-team All-American by Tommy Clark and as a second-team player by Walter Eckersall and Monty. He also received the Heston-Schulz Trophy as the team's most valuable player.

== Schedule ==
Date	Opponent	Site	Result	Attendance	Source
October 6	Lawrence (WI)	Ferry Field; Ann Arbor, MI	W 39–0		
October 9	Mount Union	Ferry Field; Ann Arbor, MI	W 35–0		
October 13	Marietta	Ferry Field; Ann Arbor, MI	W 28–6		
October 16	Case	Ferry Field; Ann Arbor, MI	W 14–3		
October 23	Michigan Agricultural	Ferry Field; Ann Arbor, MI (rivalry)	L 0–24	21,000	
October 30	Syracuse	Ferry Field; Ann Arbor, MI	L 7–14		
November 6	Cornell^{†}	Ferry Field; Ann Arbor, MI	L 7–34	22,000	
November 13	at Penn	Franklin Field; Philadelphia, PA	T 0–0		
^{†}Homecoming

== Roster ==
=== Letter winners ===
Player	Position	Games started	Hometown	Height	Weight	Age
Clyde E. Bastian	Halfback; Fullback	0; 1	Williamsport, PA	5-8	168	22
James Bland Catlett	Halfback	3	Brookings, SD			
William D. Cochran	Guard	8	Houghton, MI	5-8	235	
Maurice F. Dunne	End	3	Springfield, IL	6-0	164	
John Maulbetsch	Halfback	7	Ann Arbor, MI	5-8	168	
Frank Millard	Guard	3	Ann Arbor, MI	5-7	212	
Walter Neimann	Center; End	3; 1	Hermansville, MI	5-11	165	21
John K. Norton	Tackle; Center; Guard	3; 2; 1	Ontonagon, MI			
Fred Rehor	Guard	2	Hastings, MI	6-0	262	21
Lawrence Roehm	Quarterback	7	Detroit, MI	5-8½	168	22
Cedric C. Smith	Fullback	5	Bay City, MI	6-0	190	20
Karl S. Staatz	End	5	Tacoma, WA	5-10	168	22
Robert W. Watson	Tackle	8	Ludington, MI	5-9	174	
Richard F. "Dick" Weske	Guard; Tackle	0; 2	New London, CT	6-0	190	
James L. Whalen	Tackle; Guard; End	2; 1; 1	Savannah, NY	5-10	188	

=== Reserves ===
- Leland Benton, Valparaiso, IN, started 3 games at end, 4 games at halfback
- Alan W. Boyd, Indianapolis, IN, started 1 game at guard
- Harry L. Calvin, Jr., Detroit, MI, quarterback
- Otto Eberwein, Ann Arbor, MI, started 2 games at halfback
- Egmont Goetz Hildner, Ann Arbor, MI, started 2 games at end
- Hepburn Ingham, Des Moines, IA, started 1 game at end
- Hoyne Howe, Oak Park, IL, started 3 games center
- Philip T. Raymond, Saginaw, MI, started 2 games at fullback
- Lewis Reimann, Iron River, MI, started 1 game at tackle
- James H. Sharpe, Sault Ste. Marie, MI, halfback
- Harold M. Zeigler, Pueblo, CO, started 1 game at quarterback

== Awards and honors ==
- Captain: William D. Cochran
- All-Americans: John Maulbetsch (Walter Eckersall, 2nd team; Monty, 2nd team; Tommy Clark, 1st team)
- Heston-Schulz Trophy (team MVP): John Maulbetsch

== Coaching staff ==
- Head coach: Fielding H. Yost
- Assistant coaches: Ernest Allmendinger (Second Assistant Coach), Prentiss Douglass, Ralph A. McGinnis (Third Assistant Coach), James Raynsford, Germany Schulz (First Assistant Coach)
- Trainer: Stephen Farrell
- Manager: Boyd M. Compton
