= 1915 South Dakota Coyotes football team =

American college football season

1915 South Dakota Coyotes football
- Conference: Independent
- Record: 4–2–2
- Head coach: Ion Cortright (2nd season)

1915 Midwestern college football independents records
	Conf.			Overall
Team	W	L	T	W		L		T
Dubuque		–		7	–	0	–	0
Carleton		–		6	–	0	–	0
Wabash		–		7	–	0	–	1
Notre Dame		–		7	–	1	–	0
Grinnell		–		6	–	1	–	0
Michigan Agricultural		–		5	–	1	–	0
Western State Normal		–		5	–	1	–	0
South Dakota State		–		5	–	1	–	1
Heidelberg		–		5	–	2	–	1
Millikin		–		5	–	2	–	1
Nebraska Wesleyan		–		6	–	3	–	0
St. Mary's (OH)		–		3	–	2	–	0
Michigan State Normal		–		4	–	2	–	1
Doane		–		5	–	3	–	0
Marquette		–		4	–	2	–	2
South Dakota		–		4	–	2	–	2
Jamestown		–		3	–	2	–	1
Penn (IA)		–		4	–	3	–	0
Michigan		–		4	–	3	–	1
Saint Louis		–		4	–	3	–	1
Creighton		–		3	–	3	–	1
Haskell		–		3	–	3	–	0
Iowa State Teachers		–		3	–	3	–	0
North Dakota Agricultural		–		3	–	3	–	0
St. Thomas (MN)		–		2	–	2	–	1
Hanover		–		2	–	4	–	0
Lake Forest		–		2	–	4	–	0
Northern Illinois State		–		2	–	5	–	1
Lawrence		–		2	–	5	–	0
Earlham		–		2	–	6	–	0
Detroit		–		1	–	5	–	0
Butler		–		1	–	6	–	0
Lincoln (MO)		–		0	–	2	–	0

The 1915 South Dakota Coyotes football team represented the University of South Dakota during the 1915 college football season. In Ion Cortright's second and final season at South Dakota, the Coyotes compiled a 4–2–2 record and outscored their opponents 86 to 39, not allowing a single point in their final four contests.

== Schedule ==
Date	Opponent	Site	Result	Attendance	Source
October 8	at Montana	Aberdeen, SD	W 10–7		
October 16	at Minnesota	Northrop Field; Minneapolis, MN	L 0–19		
October 23	Dakota Wesleyan	Vermillion, SD	W 23–7		
October 30	at Notre Dame	Cartier Field; Notre Dame, IN	L 0–6		
November 6	at South Dakota State	Brookings, SD (rivalry)	W 7–0	5,000	
November 13	vs. North Dakota	Sioux Falls, SD (rivalry)	T 0–0		
November 19	Yankton	Vermillion, SD	W 46–0		
November 25	at Creighton	Creighton Field; Omaha, NE	T 0–0		
