= 1915 Northern Illinois State Normal football team =

American college football season

1915 Northern Illinois State Normal football
- Conference: Independent
- Record: 2–5–1
- Head coach: William Wirtz (6th season)
- Captain: Henry Barton
- Home stadium: Glidden Field

1915 Midwestern college football independents records
| | Conf. | | | Overall |
| Team | W | L | T | W | | L | | T |
|---|---|---|---|---|---|---|---|---|
| Dubuque | | – | | 7 | – | 0 | – | 0 |
| Carleton | | – | | 6 | – | 0 | – | 0 |
| Wabash | | – | | 7 | – | 0 | – | 1 |
| Notre Dame | | – | | 7 | – | 1 | – | 0 |
| Grinnell | | – | | 6 | – | 1 | – | 0 |
| Michigan Agricultural | | – | | 5 | – | 1 | – | 0 |
| Western State Normal | | – | | 5 | – | 1 | – | 0 |
| South Dakota State | | – | | 5 | – | 1 | – | 1 |
| Heidelberg | | – | | 5 | – | 2 | – | 1 |
| Millikin | | – | | 5 | – | 2 | – | 1 |
| Nebraska Wesleyan | | – | | 6 | – | 3 | – | 0 |
| St. Mary's (OH) | | – | | 3 | – | 2 | – | 0 |
| Michigan State Normal | | – | | 4 | – | 2 | – | 1 |
| Doane | | – | | 5 | – | 3 | – | 0 |
| Marquette | | – | | 4 | – | 2 | – | 2 |
| South Dakota | | – | | 4 | – | 2 | – | 2 |
| Jamestown | | – | | 3 | – | 2 | – | 1 |
| Penn (IA) | | – | | 4 | – | 3 | – | 0 |
| Michigan | | – | | 4 | – | 3 | – | 1 |
| Saint Louis | | – | | 4 | – | 3 | – | 1 |
| Creighton | | – | | 3 | – | 3 | – | 1 |
| Haskell | | – | | 3 | – | 3 | – | 0 |
| Iowa State Teachers | | – | | 3 | – | 3 | – | 0 |
| North Dakota Agricultural | | – | | 3 | – | 3 | – | 0 |
| St. Thomas (MN) | | – | | 2 | – | 2 | – | 1 |
| Hanover | | – | | 2 | – | 4 | – | 0 |
| Lake Forest | | – | | 2 | – | 4 | – | 0 |
| Northern Illinois State | | – | | 2 | – | 5 | – | 1 |
| Lawrence | | – | | 2 | – | 5 | – | 0 |
| Earlham | | – | | 2 | – | 6 | – | 0 |
| Detroit | | – | | 1 | – | 5 | – | 0 |
| Butler | | – | | 1 | – | 6 | – | 0 |
| Lincoln (MO) | | – | | 0 | – | 2 | – | 0 |

The 1915 Northern Illinois State Normal football team represented Northern Illinois State Normal College as an independent in the 1915 college football season. They were led by sixth-year head coach William Wirtz and played their home games at Glidden Field, located on the east end of campus. The team finished the season with a 2–5–1 record. Henry Barton was the team's captain.

== Schedule ==
| Date | Opponent | Site | Result | Source |
|---|---|---|---|---|
| October 2 | at West Aurora High School | Aurora, IL | L 0–17 | |
| October 9 | North-Western College | Glidden Field; DeKalb, IL | W 25–14 | |
| October 16 | at Wheaton (IL) | Wheaton, IL | L 3–37 | |
| October 23 | at St. Viator | Kankakee, IL | L 0–96 | |
| October 30 | at North-Western College | Naperville, IL | L 0–13 | |
| November 6 | Evanston Academy | Glidden Field; DeKalb, IL | L 0–21 | |
| November 13 | Wheaton (IL) | Glidden Field; DeKalb, IL | W 41–0 | |
| November 20 | Elgin Academy | Glidden Field; DeKalb, IL | T 12–12 | |
