= 1915 Michigan Agricultural Aggies football team =

American college football season

1915 Michigan Agricultural Aggies football
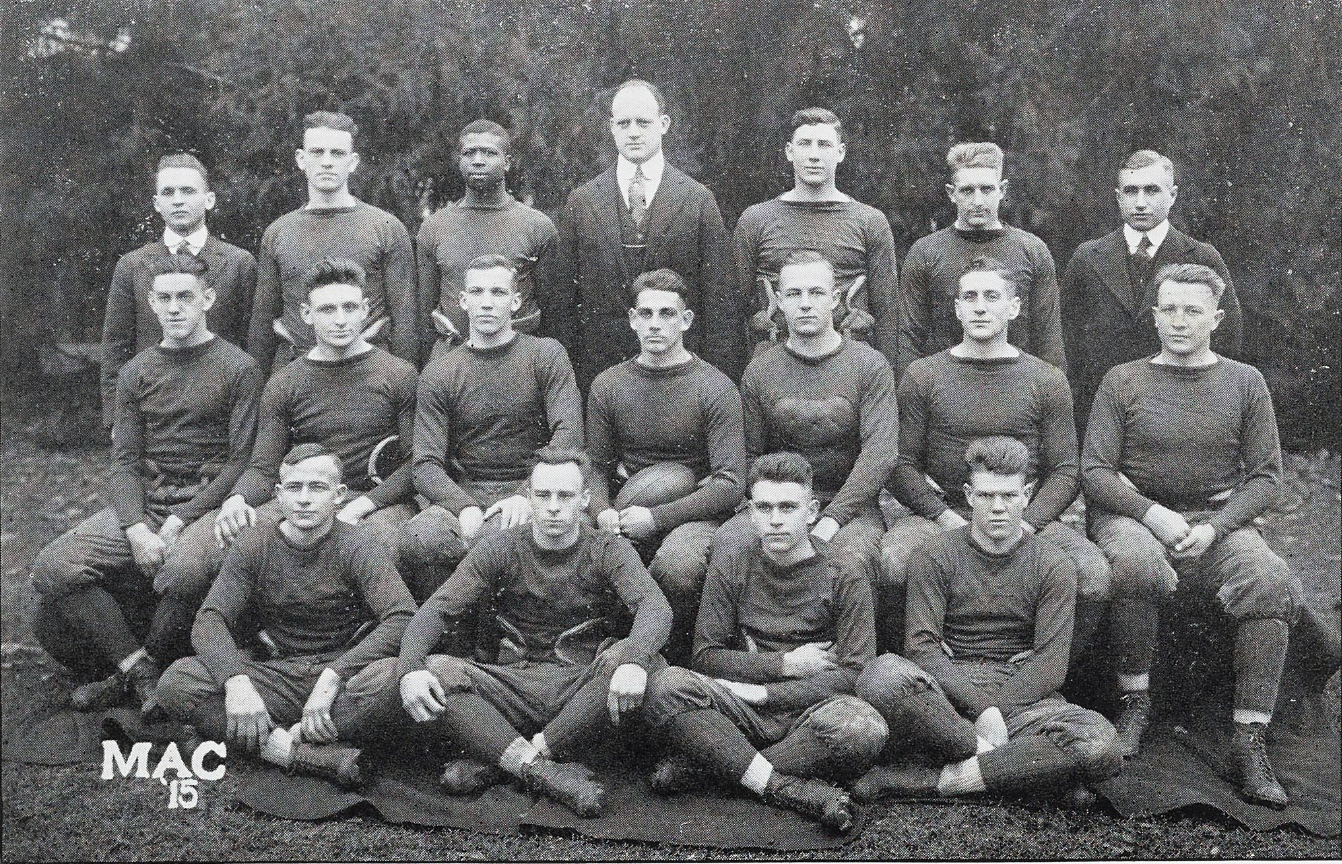
- Conference: Independent
- Record: 5–1
- Head coach: John Macklin (5th season)
- Captain: Blake Miller
- Home stadium: College Field

1915 Midwestern college football independents records
	Conf.			Overall
Team	W	L	T	W		L		T
Dubuque		–		7	–	0	–	0
Carleton		–		6	–	0	–	0
Wabash		–		7	–	0	–	1
Notre Dame		–		7	–	1	–	0
Grinnell		–		6	–	1	–	0
Michigan Agricultural		–		5	–	1	–	0
Western State Normal		–		5	–	1	–	0
South Dakota State		–		5	–	1	–	1
Heidelberg		–		5	–	2	–	1
Millikin		–		5	–	2	–	1
Nebraska Wesleyan		–		6	–	3	–	0
St. Mary's (OH)		–		3	–	2	–	0
Michigan State Normal		–		4	–	2	–	1
Doane		–		5	–	3	–	0
Marquette		–		4	–	2	–	2
South Dakota		–		4	–	2	–	2
Jamestown		–		3	–	2	–	1
Penn (IA)		–		4	–	3	–	0
Michigan		–		4	–	3	–	1
Saint Louis		–		4	–	3	–	1
Creighton		–		3	–	3	–	1
Haskell		–		3	–	3	–	0
Iowa State Teachers		–		3	–	3	–	0
North Dakota Agricultural		–		3	–	3	–	0
St. Thomas (MN)		–		2	–	2	–	1
Hanover		–		2	–	4	–	0
Lake Forest		–		2	–	4	–	0
Northern Illinois State		–		2	–	5	–	1
Lawrence		–		2	–	5	–	0
Earlham		–		2	–	6	–	0
Detroit		–		1	–	5	–	0
Butler		–		1	–	6	–	0
Lincoln (MO)		–		0	–	2	–	0

The 1915 Michigan Agricultural Aggies football team was an American football team that represented Michigan Agricultural College (MAC) as an independent during the 1915 college football season. In their fifth and final year under head coach John Macklin, the Aggies compiled a 5–1 record and outscored their opponents 258 to 38.

At the end of the 1915 season, fullback Neno DaPrato was a consensus first-team selection on the 1915 College Football All-America Team. He was called "the greatest scoring machine of the year" after scoring 130 points in just six games during the 1915 season.

== Schedule ==
Date	Opponent	Site	Result	Attendance	Source
October 2	Olivet	College Field; East Lansing, MI	W 34–0		
October 9	Alma	College Field; East Lansing, MI	W 77–12		
October 16	Carroll (WI)	College Field; East Lansing, MI	W 56–0		
October 23	at Michigan	Ferry Field; Ann Arbor, MI (rivalry)	W 24–0	21,000	
October 30	Oregon Agricultural^{†}	College Field; East Lansing, MI	L 0–20		
November 6	Marquette	College Field; East Lansing, MI	W 68–6		
^{†}Homecoming
