= 1915 Detroit Tigers football team =

American college football season

1915 Detroit Tigers football
- Conference: Independent
- Record: 1–5
- Head coach: Harry Costello (1st season)
- Home stadium: Mack Park

1915 Midwestern college football independents records
	Conf.			Overall
Team	W	L	T	W		L		T
Dubuque		–		7	–	0	–	0
Carleton		–		6	–	0	–	0
Wabash		–		7	–	0	–	1
Notre Dame		–		7	–	1	–	0
Grinnell		–		6	–	1	–	0
Michigan Agricultural		–		5	–	1	–	0
Western State Normal		–		5	–	1	–	0
South Dakota State		–		5	–	1	–	1
Heidelberg		–		5	–	2	–	1
Millikin		–		5	–	2	–	1
Nebraska Wesleyan		–		6	–	3	–	0
St. Mary's (OH)		–		3	–	2	–	0
Michigan State Normal		–		4	–	2	–	1
Doane		–		5	–	3	–	0
Marquette		–		4	–	2	–	2
South Dakota		–		4	–	2	–	2
Jamestown		–		3	–	2	–	1
Penn (IA)		–		4	–	3	–	0
Michigan		–		4	–	3	–	1
Saint Louis		–		4	–	3	–	1
Creighton		–		3	–	3	–	1
Haskell		–		3	–	3	–	0
Iowa State Teachers		–		3	–	3	–	0
North Dakota Agricultural		–		3	–	3	–	0
St. Thomas (MN)		–		2	–	2	–	1
Hanover		–		2	–	4	–	0
Lake Forest		–		2	–	4	–	0
Northern Illinois State		–		2	–	5	–	1
Lawrence		–		2	–	5	–	0
Earlham		–		2	–	6	–	0
Detroit		–		1	–	5	–	0
Butler		–		1	–	6	–	0
Lincoln (MO)		–		0	–	2	–	0

The 1915 Detroit Tigers football team was an American football team that represented the University of Detroit in the 1915 college football season. In its first season under head coach Harry Costello, the team compiled a 1–5 record and was outscored by its opponents by a combined total of 207 to 18.

In its schedule for the 1915 University of Detroit football team, College Football Data Warehouse erroneously included an undated game against Hutchinson Central High School from Buffalo, New York. However, the Detroit Free Press for October 17, 1915, at page 23, shows that the game against Hutchinson was played on October 16 at Elmwood Field by the "Detroit University School", a high school team in Detroit, not by the University of Detroit. In fact, the University of Detroit team played a game against Olivet College at Mack Park on the same afternoon.

== Schedule ==
Date	Opponent	Site	Result	Source
October 2	Detroit alumni	Mack Park; Detroit, MI	W 7–6	
October 9	at Heidelberg	Armstrong Field; Tiffin, OH	L 8–30	
October 16	Olivet	Mack Park; Detroit, MI	L 3–25	
October 23	at Michigan State Normal	Normal Field; Ypsilanti, MI	L 0–46	
October 30	Polish Seminary	Mack Park; Detroit, MI	L 0–21	
November 13	at Michigan freshmen	Ferry Field; Ann Arbor, MI	L 0–79	
