= 1915 Nebraska Cornhuskers football team =

American college football season

1915 Nebraska Cornhuskers football

National champion (Billingsley) MVC champion
- Conference: Missouri Valley Conference
- Record: 8–0 (4–0 MVC)
- Head coach: Ewald O. Stiehm (5th season)
- Home stadium: Nebraska Field

1915 Missouri Valley Conference football standings
	Conf.					Overall
Team	W		L		T	W		L		T
Nebraska $	4	–	0	–	0	8	–	0	–	0
Kansas	3	–	1	–	0	6	–	2	–	0
Iowa State	2	–	1	–	0	6	–	2	–	0
Washington University	1	–	1	–	0	3	–	2	–	0
Missouri	1	–	3	–	1	2	–	5	–	1
Drake	1	–	4	–	0	2	–	6	–	0
Kansas State	0	–	2	–	1	3	–	4	–	1
$ – Conference champion

The 1915 Nebraska Cornhuskers football team represented the University of Nebraska in the 1915 college football season. The team was coached by fifth-year head coach Ewald O. Stiehm and played its home games at Nebraska Field in Lincoln, Nebraska. They competed as members of the Missouri Valley Conference. The 1915 season was part of Nebraska's 34-game unbeaten streak that ran from 1912 to 1916.

Following the season, Guy Chamberlin was named the first All-American in Nebraska history. Stiehm, who had won the MVC in each of his five seasons at Nebraska and also coached the school's basketball team, was offered $4,500 annually to take over Indiana's athletic department. Despite suggesting he'd remain at Nebraska for less money, the school refused to offer him a raise and Stiehm exited with the highest winning percentage of any coach in school history.

== Schedule ==
Date	Time	Opponent	Site	Result	Attendance	Source
October 2	2:30 p.m.	Drake	Nebraska Field; Lincoln, NE	W 48–13		
October 9	2:30 p.m.	Kansas State	Nebraska Field; Lincoln, NE (rivalry)	W 31–0		
October 16	2:30 p.m.	Washburn*	Nebraska Field; Lincoln, NE	W 47–0		
October 23	2:30 p.m.	Notre Dame*	Nebraska Field; Lincoln, NE (rivalry)	W 20–19		
October 30	2:30 p.m.	at Iowa State	State Field; Ames, IA (rivalry)	W 21–0		
November 6	2:30 p.m.	Nebraska Wesleyan*	Nebraska Field; Lincoln, NE	W 30–0		
November 13	2:30 p.m.	at Kansas	Ahearn Field; Lawrence, KS (rivalry)	W 33–0	10,000	
November 20	2:30 p.m.	Iowa*^{†}	Nebraska Field; Lincoln, NE (rivalry)	W 52–7		
*Non-conference game; ^{†}Homecoming

== Coaching staff ==
Coach	Position	First year	Alma mater
Ewald O. Stiehm	Head coach	1911	Wisconsin
Jack Best	Trainer	1890	Nebraska

== Roster ==
Abbott, Earl RG
Balis, Arthur E
Caley, Loren QB
Chamberlin, Guy HB
Cook, John QB
Corey, Tim T
Doyle, Raymond FB
Gardiner, Jimmy HB
Halbersleben, Paul C
Kositsky, Ed T
Moser, Ellsworth C
Otopalik, Hugo HB
Proctor, Brodie HB
Rasmussen, John E
Reese, Herbert HB
Riddell, Ted E
Rutherford, Richard HB
Shaw, Edson T
Shields, Paul G

Starters

Position	Player
Quarterback	Loren Caley
Left Halfback	Richard Rutherford
Right Halfback	Brodie Proctor
Fullback	Hugo Otopalik
Left End	Guy Chamerlin
Left Tackle	Tim Corey
Left Guard	Paul Shields
Center	Ellsworth Moser
Right Guard	Earl Abbott
Right Tackle	Edson Shaw
Right End	Ted Riddell

== Game summaries ==
=== Drake ===
Drake at Nebraska

Team	1	2	Total
Drake			13
• Nebraska			48

- Date: October 2
- Location: Nebraska Field, Lincoln, NE
- Game start: 2:30 p.m.

=== Kansas State ===
Kansas State at Nebraska

Team	1	2	Total
Kansas State			0
• Nebraska			31

- Date: October 9
- Location: Nebraska Field, Lincoln, NE
- Game start: 2:30 p.m.

=== Washburn ===
Washburn at Nebraska

Team	1	2	Total
Washburn			0
• Nebraska			47

- Date: October 16
- Location: Nebraska Field, Lincoln, NE
- Game start: 2:30 p.m.

=== Notre Dame ===
Notre Dame at Nebraska

Team	1	2	Total
Notre Dame			19
• Nebraska			20

- Date: October 23
- Location: Nebraska Field, Lincoln, NE
- Game start: 2:30 p.m.

This was the first meeting between Nebraska and Notre Dame. Written accounts of this game compare with NU's 7–0 victory over Minnesota in 1913 and 6–6 tie against Michigan in 1911. Nebraska trailed 13–7 at halftime but a pair of late touchdowns gave the Cornhuskers a one-point win.

=== At Iowa State ===
Nebraska at Iowa State

Team	1	2	Total
• Nebraska			21
Iowa State			0

- Date: October 30
- Location: State Field, Ames, IA
- Game start: 2:30 p.m.

=== Nebraska Wesleyan ===
Nebraska Wesleyan at Nebraska

Team	1	2	Total
Nebraska Wesleyan			0
• Nebraska			30

- Date: November 6
- Location: Nebraska Field, Lincoln, NE
- Game start: 2:30 p.m.

=== At Kansas ===
Nebraska at Kansas

Team	1	2	Total
• Nebraska			33
Kansas			0

- Date: November 13
- Location: Ahearn Field, Lawrence, KS
- Game start: 2:30 p.m.

=== Iowa ===
Iowa at Nebraska

Team	1	2	Total
Iowa			7
• Nebraska			52

- Date: November 20
- Location: Nebraska Field, Lincoln, NE
- Game start: 2:30 p.m.
