= 1915 Washington University Pikers football team =

American college football season

1915 Washington University Pikers football
- Conference: Missouri Valley Conference
- Record: 3–2 (0–2 MVC)
- Head coach: William P. Edmunds (3rd season)
- Captain: Poge Lewis
- Home stadium: Francis Field

1915 Missouri Valley Conference football standings
	Conf.					Overall
Team	W		L		T	W		L		T
Nebraska $	4	–	0	–	0	8	–	0	–	0
Kansas	3	–	1	–	0	6	–	2	–	0
Iowa State	2	–	1	–	0	6	–	2	–	0
Washington University	1	–	1	–	0	3	–	2	–	0
Missouri	1	–	3	–	1	2	–	5	–	1
Drake	1	–	4	–	0	2	–	6	–	0
Kansas State	0	–	2	–	1	3	–	4	–	1
$ – Conference champion

The 1915 Washington University Pikers football team represented Washington University in St. Louis as a member of the Missouri Valley Conference (MVC) during the 1915 college football season. Led by third-year head coach William P. Edmunds, the Pikers compiled an overall record of 3–2 with a mark of 1–1 in conference play, placing fourth in the MVC. Washington University played home games at Francis Field in St. Louis.

== Schedule ==
Date	Time	Opponent	Site	Result	Attendance	Source
October 9	3:00 p.m.	Missouri	Francis Field; St. Louis, MO	W 13–0		
October 16		at Wabash*	Ingalls Field; Crawfordsville, IN	L 3–13		
October 23	3:00 p.m.	Drury*	Francis Field; St. Louis, MO	W 38–0	1,500	
October 30	3:30 p.m.	at Drake	Drake Stadium; Des Moines, IA	L 16–26		
November 13	2:05 p.m.	at Saint Louis*	Sportsman's Park; St. Louis, MO	W 13–7	9,000	
*Non-conference game
