= 1915 Iowa State Cyclones football team =

American college football season

1915 Iowa State Cyclones football
- Conference: Missouri Valley Conference
- Record: 6–2 (2–1 MVC)
- Head coach: Charles Mayser (1st season)
- Captain: Edward John
- Home stadium: State Field

1915 Missouri Valley Conference football standings
| | Conf. | | | | | Overall |
| Team | W | | L | | T | W | | L | | T |
|---|---|---|---|---|---|---|---|---|---|---|
| Nebraska $ | 4 | – | 0 | – | 0 | 8 | – | 0 | – | 0 |
| Kansas | 3 | – | 1 | – | 0 | 6 | – | 2 | – | 0 |
| Iowa State | 2 | – | 1 | – | 0 | 6 | – | 2 | – | 0 |
| Washington University | 1 | – | 1 | – | 0 | 3 | – | 2 | – | 0 |
| Missouri | 1 | – | 3 | – | 1 | 2 | – | 5 | – | 1 |
| Drake | 1 | – | 4 | – | 0 | 2 | – | 6 | – | 0 |
| Kansas State | 0 | – | 2 | – | 1 | 3 | – | 4 | – | 1 |
$ – Conference champion

The 1915 Iowa State Cyclones football team represented Iowa State College of Agricultural and Mechanic Arts (later renamed Iowa State University) in the Missouri Valley Conference during the 1915 college football season. In their first season under head coach Charles Mayser, the Cyclones compiled a 6–2 record (2–1 against conference opponents), finished in third place in the conference, shut out four of eight opponents, and outscored opponents by a combined total of 129 to 75. They played their home games at State Field in Ames, Iowa. Edward John was the team captain.

== Schedule ==
| Date | Opponent | Site | Result | Attendance |
|---|---|---|---|---|
| September 25 | Ellsworth* | State Field; Ames, IA | W 31–0 | |
| October 2 | Simpson* | State Field; Ames, IA | W 27–0 | |
| October 9 | at Minnesota* | Northrop Field; Minneapolis, MN | L 6–34 | 6,000 |
| October 23 | Missouri | State Field; Ames, IA (rivalry) | W 14–6 | |
| October 30 | Nebraska^{†} | State Field; Ames, IA (rivalry) | L 0–21 | |
| November 6 | Morningside* | State Field; Ames, IA | W 7–0 | |
| November 13 | at Iowa* | Iowa Field; Iowa City, IA (rivalry) | W 16–0 | |
| November 25 | at Drake | Drake Stadium; Des Moines, IA | W 28–14 | |
*Non-conference game; ^{†}Homecoming
