= 1915 Wabash Little Giants football team =

American college football season

1915 Wabash Little Giants football
- Conference: Independent
- Record: 7–0–1
- Head coach: Paul Sheeks (1st season)
- Home stadium: Ingalls Field

1915 Midwestern college football independents records
	Conf.			Overall
Team	W	L	T	W		L		T
Dubuque		–		7	–	0	–	0
Carleton		–		6	–	0	–	0
Wabash		–		7	–	0	–	1
Notre Dame		–		7	–	1	–	0
Grinnell		–		6	–	1	–	0
Michigan Agricultural		–		5	–	1	–	0
Western State Normal		–		5	–	1	–	0
South Dakota State		–		5	–	1	–	1
Heidelberg		–		5	–	2	–	1
Millikin		–		5	–	2	–	1
Nebraska Wesleyan		–		6	–	3	–	0
St. Mary's (OH)		–		3	–	2	–	0
Michigan State Normal		–		4	–	2	–	1
Doane		–		5	–	3	–	0
Marquette		–		4	–	2	–	2
South Dakota		–		4	–	2	–	2
Jamestown		–		3	–	2	–	1
Penn (IA)		–		4	–	3	–	0
Michigan		–		4	–	3	–	1
Saint Louis		–		4	–	3	–	1
Creighton		–		3	–	3	–	1
Haskell		–		3	–	3	–	0
Iowa State Teachers		–		3	–	3	–	0
North Dakota Agricultural		–		3	–	3	–	0
St. Thomas (MN)		–		2	–	2	–	1
Hanover		–		2	–	4	–	0
Lake Forest		–		2	–	4	–	0
Northern Illinois State		–		2	–	5	–	1
Lawrence		–		2	–	5	–	0
Earlham		–		2	–	6	–	0
Detroit		–		1	–	5	–	0
Butler		–		1	–	6	–	0
Lincoln (MO)		–		0	–	2	–	0

The 1915 Wabash Little Giants football team represented Wabash College as an independent during the 1915 college football season. Led by first-year head coach Paul Sheeks, the Little Giants compiled a record of 7–0–1. Wabash played home games at Ingalls Field in Crawfordsville, Indiana.

== Schedule ==
Date	Opponent	Site	Result	Source
October 2	at Purdue	Stuart Field; West Lafayette, IN	T 7–7	
October 9	Louisville	Ingalls Field; Crawfordsville, IN	W 38–0	
October 16	Washington University	Ingalls Field; Crawfordsville, IN	W 13–3	
October 23	Franklin (IN)	Ingalls Field; Crawfordsville, IN	W 40–9	
October 30	at Butler	Irwin Field; Indianapolis, IN	W 35–7	
November 6	Northwestern College	Ingalls Field; Crawfordsville, IN	W 34–7	
November 13	at Earlham	Richmond, IN	W 35–0	
November 20	vs. DePauw	Indianapolis, IN	W 34–0	
