= Lawrence Roehm =

American sports player and businessman (1893–1958)

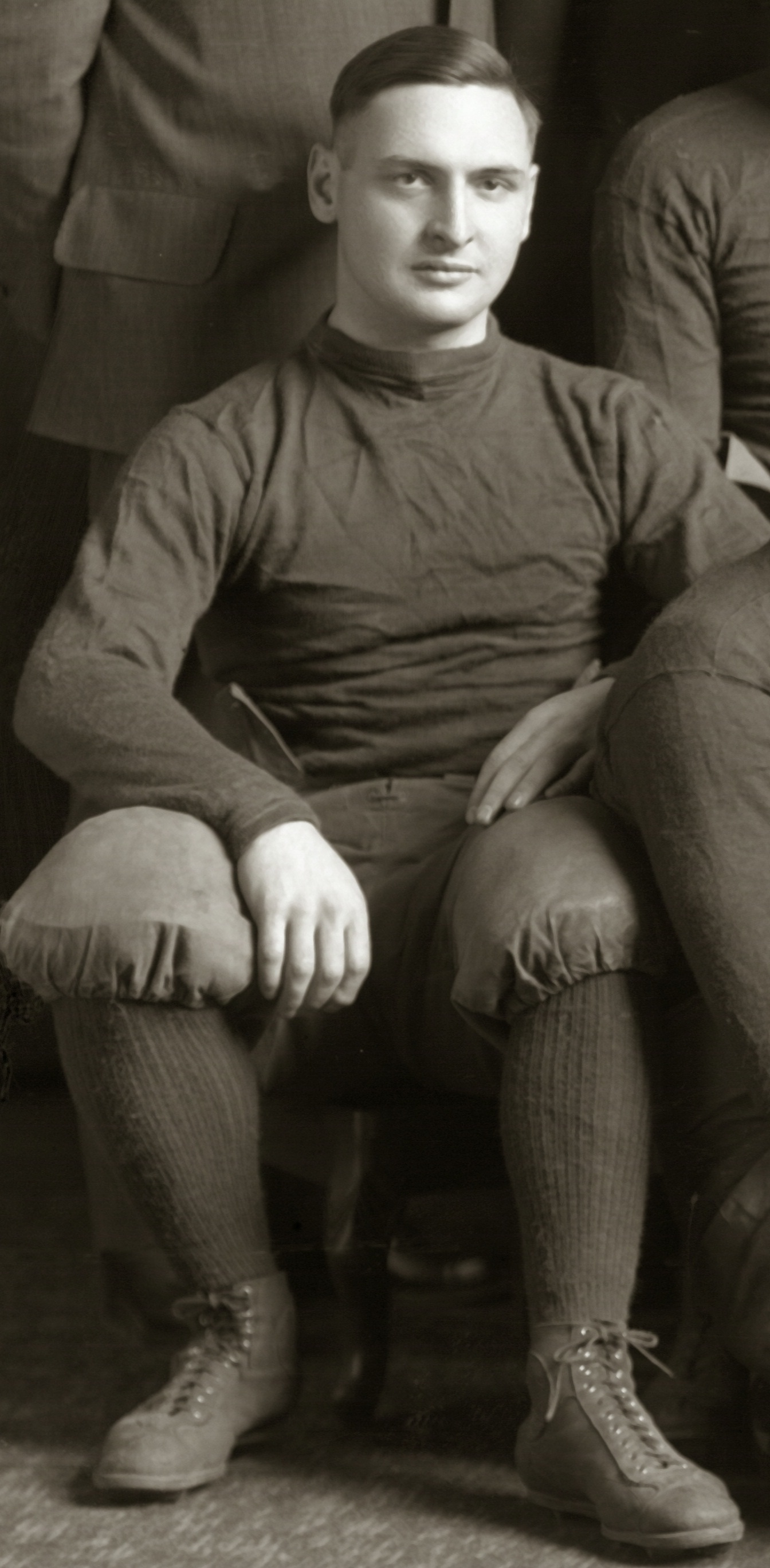
- Lawrence Roehm cropped from 1915 Michigan football team photograph

Profile
- Positions: Quarterback, Halfback

Personal information
- Born: July 5, 1893; Detroit, Michigan
- Died: October 10, 1958 (aged 65); Detroit, Michigan
- Listed height: 5 ft 8.5 in (1.74 m)
- Listed weight: 168 lb (76 kg)

Career information
- High school: Central High School (Detroit, MI)
- College: Michigan

Career history
- 1913–1915: Michigan

Lawrence Stevens "Rummy" Roehm (July 5, 1893 – October 10, 1958) was an American football and baseball player and businessman from Detroit, Michigan. He played college football for the University of Michigan from 1913 to 1915 and college baseball in 1916. He was the starting quarterback of the 1915 Michigan Wolverines football team.

== Early life ==
Roehm was the son of Charles M. Roehm, one of the leaders in Detroit's growing automobile industry in the early 20th century. He grew up in Detroit, Michigan, and attended Detroit Central High School. He played football in high school, but his athletic career was hampered by injuries. As a sophomore, Roehm injured his ankle in an early practice session and was unable to play during the 1909 football season. As a junior in 1910, Roehm was the starting fullback for Detroit Central and led the team to a state championship. As a senior in 1911, he was considered "a sure candidate for all-city honors," but he suffered a broken cheek bone early in the third game of the season against Saginaw-Eastern and was unable to play for the remainder of the season.

Despite the injuries, Roehm won a reputation as one of Detroit's top football prospects. In December 1911, the Detroit Free Press published a feature story on Roehm, describing him as the "Thinking Type" – "one of the type of athletes who make a study of the fall pastime and who get into every play thinkingly, apparently knowing just what to do to advance the ball or to stop an opponent's play." The article also referred to Roehm as "160 pounds of undaunted courage and as strong as a young bull," and further: "A more 'peppery' player than Roehm would be hard to imagine. He fairly imbued the team with that 'do-or-die spirit.'"

== University of Michigan ==
In 1912, Roehm enrolled at the University of Michigan. He was the captain of the freshman football team in 1912.

As a sophomore in 1913, Roehm was a backup on Michigan's varsity football team. In a 48-0 victory over Case, Roehm appeared as a substitute for Catlett at the left halfback position. Roehm worked his way into the starting lineup as a halfback in 1914. He started at the right halfback position in Michigan's 1914 games against Case (a 69-0 victory), Mt. Union (a 27-7 victory) and Vanderbilt (a 23-3 victory). He scored two touchdowns in a 69-0 victory over Case which led The New York Times to write that the game brought back "memories of the point-a-minute days."

As a senior in 1915, Roehm was moved to the quarterback position and started seven of the team's eight games at quarterback. Roehm won the starting quarterback position in competition with several other candidates. The Michigan Alumnus noted, "Roehm displayed the best ground-gaining ability of all the backs during the practice season."

In the 1915 season opener, a 35-0 victory over Mt. Union, Yost tried six different players at the quarterback position. Roehm won the competition and became the starter. Following the Mt. Union game, The Michigan Alumnus wrote, "Roehm, the athlete who was finally designated for the position in the big games, received his first trial in this [Mt. Union] clash, and showed to better advantage than all the others." Roehm started again in Michigan's victories over Marietta (28-6) and Case (14-3). After the Marietta game, The New York Times wrote:

Yost's troubles in filing the quarterback position were lessened considerably by the performances of Roehm at the pilot position during the Marietta game Wednesday. Roehm was a reserve halfback last season and equally good at running the ends and carrying the ball through the line. Roehm is the heaviest quarter a Michigan team has had in a long time, tipping the beam at 190 pounds. He covers ground fast and with a little more coaching should develop into a star quarter."

Michigan suffered its first loss of the season against Syracuse (14-7), and The Michigan Alumnus noted afterward that "Roehm was hindered in his piloting of the team through the refusal of some backs to follow instructions."

Michigan lost for a second time in 1915 against Cornell, with Roehm scoring the only touchdown for the Wolverines. The Michigan Alumnus wrote that Roehm "ducked over between the center's legs" for the touchdown.

In the final game of the 1915 season, Michigan played Penn to a scoreless tie. Roehm was credited with saving the Wolverines from defeat after intercepting a Penn pass in the end zone. Playing in the era of two-way football, Roehm earned a reputation not only for his offensive skill but also for tackling and defense. The 1916 Michiganensian (the University of Michigan yearbook) noted, "More than once Roehm was the last obstacle in front of the goal posts. He was a real obstacle." The Michiganensian also referred to Roehm as "the brains of Yost's 1916 machine."

After the 1915 football season, Roehm also played at the catcher position for the 1916 Michigan Wolverines baseball team. In January 1916, the Detroit Free Press wrote, "He is built ideally for the backstop job, being heavy and strong. He is a thorough athlete, keeping always in perfect physical trim, and his football training of last fall, when he piloted the Wolverines eleven, will stand him in good stead in his workouts under Lundgren. He is a willing worker, and is said to possess all the requisites of a coming backstop."

Roehm graduated from Michigan in 1916 as a member of the Literary Class with a bachelor of arts degree. While at Michigan, he was also a member of Chi Psi, Griffins, Druids and Sphinx.

== Military service ==
With the United States' entry into World War I, Roehm entered the military in 1917. He served with the United States Army 305th Infantry, where he was promoted from second lieutenant to first lieutenant. He saw combat action with Company E at Lorraine and Vesle.

== Business career ==
After the war, Roehm returned to Detroit and became affiliated with Roehm & Davison. The company had been founded in 1901 by Roehm's grandfather, Herman Roehm. The company became a leading supplier of parts to the city's growing automobile industry and advertised as "mfrs. and jobbers top fabrics, curtain fasteners, celluloid, buttons and tacks, leather, carpet, bows, hair, webbing, etc." Roehm's father, Сharles М. Roehm, was Herman Roehm's son and served as the company's president and general manager. In the 1920s, Roehm became the secretary and treasurer of the company in the 1920s. In 1929, the company was taken over by Jones & Laughlin Steel Corp. Roehm at that point became employed by Jones & Laughlin as the assistant manager and, starting in 1938, manager of the company's Detroit warehouse operation.

Rohem died in October 1958 in Detroit.
