= 1915 Western State Normal Hilltoppers football team =

American college football season

1915 Western State Normal Hilltoppers football
- Conference: Independent
- Record: 5–1
- Head coach: William H. Spaulding (9th season)
- Captain: Bob McKay
- Home stadium: Normal athletic field

1915 Midwestern college football independents records
	Conf.			Overall
Team	W	L	T	W		L		T
Dubuque		–		7	–	0	–	0
Carleton		–		6	–	0	–	0
Wabash		–		7	–	0	–	1
Notre Dame		–		7	–	1	–	0
Grinnell		–		6	–	1	–	0
Michigan Agricultural		–		5	–	1	–	0
Western State Normal		–		5	–	1	–	0
South Dakota State		–		5	–	1	–	1
Heidelberg		–		5	–	2	–	1
Millikin		–		5	–	2	–	1
Nebraska Wesleyan		–		6	–	3	–	0
St. Mary's (OH)		–		3	–	2	–	0
Michigan State Normal		–		4	–	2	–	1
Doane		–		5	–	3	–	0
Marquette		–		4	–	2	–	2
South Dakota		–		4	–	2	–	2
Jamestown		–		3	–	2	–	1
Penn (IA)		–		4	–	3	–	0
Michigan		–		4	–	3	–	1
Saint Louis		–		4	–	3	–	1
Creighton		–		3	–	3	–	1
Haskell		–		3	–	3	–	0
Iowa State Teachers		–		3	–	3	–	0
North Dakota Agricultural		–		3	–	3	–	0
St. Thomas (MN)		–		2	–	2	–	1
Hanover		–		2	–	4	–	0
Lake Forest		–		2	–	4	–	0
Northern Illinois State		–		2	–	5	–	1
Lawrence		–		2	–	5	–	0
Earlham		–		2	–	6	–	0
Detroit		–		1	–	5	–	0
Butler		–		1	–	6	–	0
Lincoln (MO)		–		0	–	2	–	0

The 1915 Western State Normal Hilltoppers football team represented Western State Normal School (later renamed Western Michigan University) as an independent during the 1915 college football season. In their ninth season under head coach William H. Spaulding, the Hilltoppers compiled a 5–1 record and outscored their opponents, 291 to 43. Tackle Bob McKay was the team captain.

== Schedule ==
Date	Time	Opponent	Site	Result	Attendance	Source
October 9		at Hillsdale	Hillsdale, MI	L 16–20		
October 16	2:30 p.m.	Albion	Normal athletic field; Kalamazoo, MI	W 54–7		
October 22	3:00 p.m.	Alma	Normal athletic field; Kalamazoo, MI	W 79–0	2,500	
October 30		at Olivet	Olivet, MI	W 40–0		
November 6	2:15 p.m.	Michigan State Normal	Normal athletic field; Kalamazoo, MI	W 19–0		
November 13	2:00 p.m.	Culver Military Academy	Normal athletic field; Kalamazoo, MI	W 83–16	2,500	
