= 1915 North Dakota Agricultural Aggies football team =

American college football season

1915 North Dakota Agricultural Aggies football
- Conference: Independent
- Record: 3–3
- Head coach: Paul J. Davis (1st season)
- Captain: Steve "Dick" Bjornson
- Home stadium: Dacotah Field

1915 Midwestern college football independents records
	Conf.			Overall
Team	W	L	T	W		L		T
Dubuque		–		7	–	0	–	0
Carleton		–		6	–	0	–	0
Wabash		–		7	–	0	–	1
Notre Dame		–		7	–	1	–	0
Grinnell		–		6	–	1	–	0
Michigan Agricultural		–		5	–	1	–	0
Western State Normal		–		5	–	1	–	0
South Dakota State		–		5	–	1	–	1
Heidelberg		–		5	–	2	–	1
Millikin		–		5	–	2	–	1
Nebraska Wesleyan		–		6	–	3	–	0
St. Mary's (OH)		–		3	–	2	–	0
Michigan State Normal		–		4	–	2	–	1
Doane		–		5	–	3	–	0
Marquette		–		4	–	2	–	2
South Dakota		–		4	–	2	–	2
Jamestown		–		3	–	2	–	1
Penn (IA)		–		4	–	3	–	0
Michigan		–		4	–	3	–	1
Saint Louis		–		4	–	3	–	1
Creighton		–		3	–	3	–	1
Haskell		–		3	–	3	–	0
Iowa State Teachers		–		3	–	3	–	0
North Dakota Agricultural		–		3	–	3	–	0
St. Thomas (MN)		–		2	–	2	–	1
Hanover		–		2	–	4	–	0
Lake Forest		–		2	–	4	–	0
Northern Illinois State		–		2	–	5	–	1
Lawrence		–		2	–	5	–	0
Earlham		–		2	–	6	–	0
Detroit		–		1	–	5	–	0
Butler		–		1	–	6	–	0
Lincoln (MO)		–		0	–	2	–	0

The 1915 North Dakota Agricultural Aggies football team was an American football team that represented North Dakota Agricultural College (now known as North Dakota State University) as an independent during the 1915 college football season. In their first year under head coach Paul J. Davis, the team compiled a 3–3 record.

== Schedule ==
Date	Opponent	Site	Result	Source
October 2	Jamestown	Dacotah Field; Fargo, ND	W 33–0	
October 9	at Wahpeton	Wahpeton, ND	W 34–0	
October 15	at St. Thomas (MN)	Cadet Field; St. Paul, MN	L 0–13	
October 29	Fargo	Dacotah Field; Fargo, ND	W 7–6	
November 6	North Dakota	Dacotah Field; Fargo, ND (rivalry)	L 0–20	
November 13	at South Dakota State	Watertown, SD (rivalry)	L 0–21	
