= 1915 Creighton Blue and White football team =

American college football season

1915 Creighton Blue and White football
- Conference: Independent
- Record: 3–3–1
- Head coach: Tommy Mills (1st season)
- Home stadium: Creighton Field

1915 Midwestern college football independents records
	Conf.			Overall
Team	W	L	T	W		L		T
Dubuque		–		7	–	0	–	0
Carleton		–		6	–	0	–	0
Wabash		–		7	–	0	–	1
Notre Dame		–		7	–	1	–	0
Grinnell		–		6	–	1	–	0
Michigan Agricultural		–		5	–	1	–	0
Western State Normal		–		5	–	1	–	0
South Dakota State		–		5	–	1	–	1
Heidelberg		–		5	–	2	–	1
Millikin		–		5	–	2	–	1
Nebraska Wesleyan		–		6	–	3	–	0
St. Mary's (OH)		–		3	–	2	–	0
Michigan State Normal		–		4	–	2	–	1
Doane		–		5	–	3	–	0
Marquette		–		4	–	2	–	2
South Dakota		–		4	–	2	–	2
Jamestown		–		3	–	2	–	1
Penn (IA)		–		4	–	3	–	0
Michigan		–		4	–	3	–	1
Saint Louis		–		4	–	3	–	1
Creighton		–		3	–	3	–	1
Haskell		–		3	–	3	–	0
Iowa State Teachers		–		3	–	3	–	0
North Dakota Agricultural		–		3	–	3	–	0
St. Thomas (MN)		–		2	–	2	–	1
Hanover		–		2	–	4	–	0
Lake Forest		–		2	–	4	–	0
Northern Illinois State		–		2	–	5	–	1
Lawrence		–		2	–	5	–	0
Earlham		–		2	–	6	–	0
Detroit		–		1	–	5	–	0
Butler		–		1	–	6	–	0
Lincoln (MO)		–		0	–	2	–	0

The 1915 Creighton Bluejays football team was an American football team that represented Creighton University as an independent during the 1915 college football season. The Bluejays compiled a 3–3–1 record and outscored their opponents 138 to 72.

== Schedule ==
Date	Opponent	Site	Result	Source
October 8	at Nebraska Wesleyan	Johnson Field; Lincoln, NE	L 7–14	
October 15	Peru State Normal	Creighton Field; Omaha, NE	W 57–0	
October 23	Haskell	Creighton Field; Omaha, NE	L 3–10	
October 30	at Yankton	Yankton, SD	W 45–0	
November 6	St. Thomas (MN)	Creighton Field; Omaha, NE	W 27–7	
November 13	Notre Dame	Creighton Field; Omaha, NE	L 0–41	
November 25	South Dakota	Creighton Field; Omaha, NE	T 0–0	
