= 1915 Saint Louis Billikens football team =

American college football season

1915 Saint Louis Billikens football
- Conference: Independent
- Record: 4–3–1
- Head coach: George Keogan (2nd season)
- Captain: Frank Stanislav
- Home stadium: High School Campus, Sportsman's Park

1915 Midwestern college football independents records
| | Conf. | | | Overall |
| Team | W | L | T | W | | L | | T |
|---|---|---|---|---|---|---|---|---|
| Dubuque | | – | | 7 | – | 0 | – | 0 |
| Carleton | | – | | 6 | – | 0 | – | 0 |
| Wabash | | – | | 7 | – | 0 | – | 1 |
| Notre Dame | | – | | 7 | – | 1 | – | 0 |
| Grinnell | | – | | 6 | – | 1 | – | 0 |
| Michigan Agricultural | | – | | 5 | – | 1 | – | 0 |
| Western State Normal | | – | | 5 | – | 1 | – | 0 |
| South Dakota State | | – | | 5 | – | 1 | – | 1 |
| Heidelberg | | – | | 5 | – | 2 | – | 1 |
| Millikin | | – | | 5 | – | 2 | – | 1 |
| Nebraska Wesleyan | | – | | 6 | – | 3 | – | 0 |
| St. Mary's (OH) | | – | | 3 | – | 2 | – | 0 |
| Michigan State Normal | | – | | 4 | – | 2 | – | 1 |
| Doane | | – | | 5 | – | 3 | – | 0 |
| Marquette | | – | | 4 | – | 2 | – | 2 |
| South Dakota | | – | | 4 | – | 2 | – | 2 |
| Jamestown | | – | | 3 | – | 2 | – | 1 |
| Penn (IA) | | – | | 4 | – | 3 | – | 0 |
| Michigan | | – | | 4 | – | 3 | – | 1 |
| Saint Louis | | – | | 4 | – | 3 | – | 1 |
| Creighton | | – | | 3 | – | 3 | – | 1 |
| Haskell | | – | | 3 | – | 3 | – | 0 |
| Iowa State Teachers | | – | | 3 | – | 3 | – | 0 |
| North Dakota Agricultural | | – | | 3 | – | 3 | – | 0 |
| St. Thomas (MN) | | – | | 2 | – | 2 | – | 1 |
| Hanover | | – | | 2 | – | 4 | – | 0 |
| Lake Forest | | – | | 2 | – | 4 | – | 0 |
| Northern Illinois State | | – | | 2 | – | 5 | – | 1 |
| Lawrence | | – | | 2 | – | 5 | – | 0 |
| Earlham | | – | | 2 | – | 6 | – | 0 |
| Detroit | | – | | 1 | – | 5 | – | 0 |
| Butler | | – | | 1 | – | 6 | – | 0 |
| Lincoln (MO) | | – | | 0 | – | 2 | – | 0 |

The 1915 Saint Louis Billikens football team was an American football team that represented Saint Louis University as an independent during the 1915 college football season. In their second and final season under head coach George Keogan, the Billikens compiled a 4–3–1 record and outscored opponents by a total of 142 to 122. The team played its home games at Sportsman's Park at St. Louis.

== Schedule ==
| Date | Time | Opponent | Site | Result | Attendance | Source |
|---|---|---|---|---|---|---|
| October 1 | | at Southern Illinois Normal | Carbondale, IL | W 24–0 | | |
| October 8 | 3:00 p.m. | Shurtleff | High School Campus, Forest Park; St. Louis, MO | W 63–0 | | |
| October 16 | | Knox | Sportsman's Park; St. Louis, MO | W 20–0 | | |
| October 23 | 3:00 p.m. | DePauw | Sportsman's Park; St. Louis, MO | W 21–9 | | |
| October 30 | 3:00 p.m. | Arkansas | Sportsman's Park; St. Louis, MO | T 0–0 | | |
| November 6 | | Lombard | Sportsman's Park; St. Louis, MO | L 7–10 | | |
| November 13 | 2:05 p.m. | Washington University | Sportsman's Park; St. Louis, MO | L 7–13 | 9,000 | |
| November 25 | 2:30 p.m. | Georgetown | Sportsman's Park; St. Louis, MO | L 0–90 | 3,000 | |
