= Forest Geyer =

American football player (1892–1932)

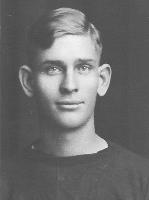

Biographical details
- Born: December 9, 1892; South Haven, Kansas, U.S.
- Died: February 7, 1932 (aged 39); Norman, Oklahoma, U.S.

Playing career
- 1913–1915: Oklahoma
- Position: Fullback

Coaching career (HC unless noted)
- 1916: Northwestern Normal
- College Football Hall of Fame; Inducted in 1973 (profile)

Forest "Spot" Geyer (December 9, 1892 – February 7, 1932) was an American football fullback. He played college football at the University of Oklahoma and attended South Haven High School in South Haven, Kansas. Geyer replaced Claude Reeds his sophomore year in 1913 when Reeds sat out a game due to an eligibility dispute. Geyer and the Oklahoma Sooners finished with a 9-1-1 record in 1914 and a 10–0 record in 1915. He was given the nickname "Spot" for his precise passing ability. He was elected to the College Football Hall of Fame in 1973.

== Head coaching record ==
Year	Team	Overall	Conference	Standing
Northwestern Normal Rangers (Oklahoma Intercollegiate Conference) (1916)
1916	Northwestern Normal	3–3		
Northwestern Normal:		3–3		
Total:		3–3		
