= 1915 Southwestern Pirates football team =

American college football season

1915 Southwestern Pirates football
- Conference: Southwest Conference
- Record: 4–3 (0–2 SWC)
- Head coach: J. Burton Rix (1st season)
- Captain: Marvin Marsh
- Home stadium: Snyder Field

1915 Southwest Conference football standings
	Conf.					Overall
Team	W		L		T	W		L		T
Oklahoma $	3	–	0	–	0	10	–	0	–	0
Baylor	3	–	0	–	0	7	–	1	–	0
Texas A&M	1	–	1	–	0	6	–	2	–	0
Texas	2	–	2	–	0	6	–	3	–	0
Arkansas	1	–	1	–	0	4	–	2	–	1
Rice	1	–	2	–	0	5	–	3	–	0
Oklahoma A&M	0	–	3	–	0	4	–	5	–	1
Southwestern (TX)	0	–	2	–	0	4	–	3	–	0
Baylor forfeited claim to co-champion for using ineligible player.

The 1915 Southwestern Pirates football team represented Southwestern University as a member of the Southwest Conference (SWC) during the 1915 college football season. Led first-year head coach J. Burton Rix, Southwestern compiled an overall record of 4–3 with a mark of 0–2 in SWC play.

== Schedule ==
Date	Time	Opponent	Site	Result	Source
October 12		Hendrix*	Snyder Field; Georgetown, TX	W 3–0	
October 23		Baylor	Snyder Field; Georgetown, TX	L 0–10	
October 30		at Texas	Clark Field; Austin, TX	L 0–45	
November 6		Daniel Baker*	Snyder Field; Georgetown, TX	W 15–0	
November 12	3:30 p.m.	at TCU*	Y. M. C. A. Athletic Park; Fort Worth, TX	L 0–21	
November 19		at SMU*	Dallas, TX	W 21–0	
November 25		at Austin*	Sherman, TX	W 7–6	
*Non-conference game
