= 1915 Missouri Tigers football team =

American college football season

1915 Missouri Tigers football
- Conference: Missouri Valley Conference
- Record: 2–5–1 (1–3–1 MVC)
- Head coach: Henry Schulte (2nd season)
- Captain: Jacob Speelman
- Home stadium: Rollins Field

1915 Missouri Valley Conference football standings
	Conf.					Overall
Team	W		L		T	W		L		T
Nebraska $	4	–	0	–	0	8	–	0	–	0
Kansas	3	–	1	–	0	6	–	2	–	0
Iowa State	2	–	1	–	0	6	–	2	–	0
Washington University	1	–	1	–	0	3	–	2	–	0
Missouri	1	–	3	–	1	2	–	5	–	1
Drake	1	–	4	–	0	2	–	6	–	0
Kansas State	0	–	2	–	1	3	–	4	–	1
$ – Conference champion

The 1915 Missouri Tigers football team was an American football team that represented the University of Missouri in the Missouri Valley Conference (MVC) during the 1915 college football season. The team compiled a 2–5–1 record (1–3–1 against MVC opponents), finished in fifth place in the conference, and was outscored by all opponents by a combined total of 102 to 72. Henry Schulte was the head coach for the second of four seasons. The team played its home games at Rollins Field in Columbia, Missouri.

== Schedule ==
Date	Time	Opponent	Site	Result	Attendance	Source
October 2		Oklahoma A&M*	Rollins Field; Columbia, MO	W 13–6		
October 9	3:00 p.m.	at Washington University	Francis Field; St. Louis, MO	L 0–13		
October 16		Oklahoma*	Rollins Field; Columbia, MO (rivalry)	L 0–24		
October 23		at Iowa State	State Field; Ames, IA (rivalry)	L 6–14		
October 30		Kansas State	Rollins Field; Columbia, MO	T 0–0		
November 6		at Northwestern*	Northwestern Field; Evanston, IL	L 6–24		
November 13		Drake	Rollins Field; Columbia, MO	W 41–13		
November 25		Kansas	Rollins Field; Columbia, MO (rivalry)	L 6–8	10,500	
*Non-conference game
