= 1915 Kendall Orange and Black football team =

American college football season

1915 Kendall Orange and Black football
- Conference: Oklahoma Intercollegiate Conference
- Record: 6–1–1 (4–1–1 OIC)
- Head coach: Sam P. McBirney (3rd season)
- Home stadium: Association Park

The 1915 Kendall Orange and Black football team represented Henry Kendall College (later renamed the University of Tulsa) during the 1915 college football season. In their third year under head coach Sam P. McBirney, the Orange and Black compiled a 6–1–1 record and outscored their opponents by a total of 257 to 33. The team played Oklahoma A&M to a scoreless tie and lost a close game to Oklahoma by a score of 14–13. In its six victories, the team outscored opponents 244 to 19, including one-sided victories over Oklahoma Mines (62–0), Northeastern State (55–0) and Southeastern Oklahoma State (45–7).

== Schedule ==
Date	Opponent	Site	Result	Source
October 1	Oklahoma Mines*	Association Park; Tulsa, OK	W 62–0	
October 8	at Northeastern State	Tahlequah, OK	W 55–0	
October 15	at Oklahoma A&M	Lewis Field; Stillwater, OK (rivalry)	T 0–0	
October 29	at Northwestern Oklahoma State	Alva, OK	W 26–6	
November 6	Oklahoma	Association Park; Tulsa, OK	L 13–14	
November 13	East Central	Association Park; Tulsa, OK	W 49–3	
November 20	at Southeastern Oklahoma State	Durant, OK	W 45–7	
November 25	Haskell*	Association Park; Tulsa, OK	W 7–3	
*Non-conference game
