= 1915 Notre Dame Fighting Irish football team =

American college football season

1915 Notre Dame Fighting Irish football
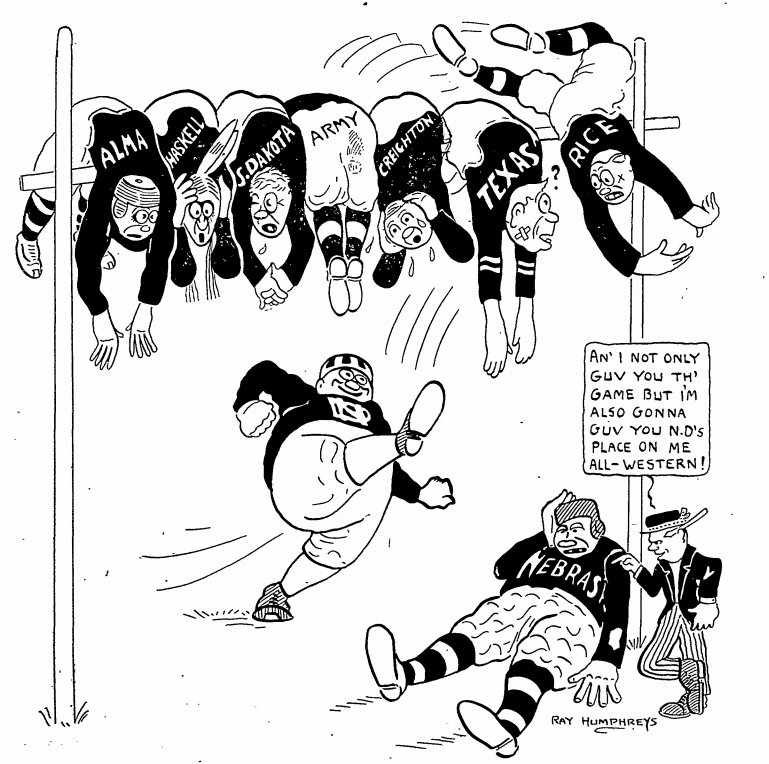
- Conference: Independent
- Record: 7–1
- Head coach: Jesse Harper (3rd season)
- Offensive scheme: Single-wing
- Captain: Freeman Fitzgerald
- Home stadium: Cartier Field

1915 Midwestern college football independents records
	Conf.			Overall
Team	W	L	T	W		L		T
Dubuque		–		7	–	0	–	0
Carleton		–		6	–	0	–	0
Wabash		–		7	–	0	–	1
Notre Dame		–		7	–	1	–	0
Grinnell		–		6	–	1	–	0
Michigan Agricultural		–		5	–	1	–	0
Western State Normal		–		5	–	1	–	0
South Dakota State		–		5	–	1	–	1
Heidelberg		–		5	–	2	–	1
Millikin		–		5	–	2	–	1
Nebraska Wesleyan		–		6	–	3	–	0
St. Mary's (OH)		–		3	–	2	–	0
Michigan State Normal		–		4	–	2	–	1
Doane		–		5	–	3	–	0
Marquette		–		4	–	2	–	2
South Dakota		–		4	–	2	–	2
Jamestown		–		3	–	2	–	1
Penn (IA)		–		4	–	3	–	0
Michigan		–		4	–	3	–	1
Saint Louis		–		4	–	3	–	1
Creighton		–		3	–	3	–	1
Haskell		–		3	–	3	–	0
Iowa State Teachers		–		3	–	3	–	0
North Dakota Agricultural		–		3	–	3	–	0
St. Thomas (MN)		–		2	–	2	–	1
Hanover		–		2	–	4	–	0
Lake Forest		–		2	–	4	–	0
Northern Illinois State		–		2	–	5	–	1
Lawrence		–		2	–	5	–	0
Earlham		–		2	–	6	–	0
Detroit		–		1	–	5	–	0
Butler		–		1	–	6	–	0
Lincoln (MO)		–		0	–	2	–	0

The 1915 Notre Dame Fighting Irish football team was an American football team that represented the University of Notre Dame as an independent during the 1915 college football season. In their third year under head coach Jesse Harper, the Irish compiled a 7–1 record, shut out five opponents, and outscored all opponents by a total of 230 to 29. In games against major opponents, they lost by one point to Nebraska (19–20) and defeated Army (7–0), Texas (36–7), and Rice (55–2).

Knute Rockne was assistant coach for the second year. Key players on the 1915 team included Freeman Fitzgerald.

The team played its home games at Cartier Field in Notre Dame, Indiana.

== Schedule ==
Date	Opponent	Site	Result	Source
October 2	Alma	Cartier Field; Notre Dame, IN	W 32–0	
October 9	Haskell	Cartier Field; Notre Dame, IN	W 34–0	
October 23	at Nebraska	Nebraska Field; Lincoln, NE (rivalry)	L 19–20	
October 30	South Dakota	Cartier Field; Notre Dame, IN	W 6–0	
November 6	at Army	The Plain; West Point, NY (rivalry)	W 7–0	
November 13	at Creighton	Creighton Field; Omaha, NE	W 41–0	
November 25	at Texas	Clark Field; Austin, TX	W 36–7	
November 27	at Rice	West End Park; Houston, TX	W 55–2	

== Personnel ==
=== Players ===
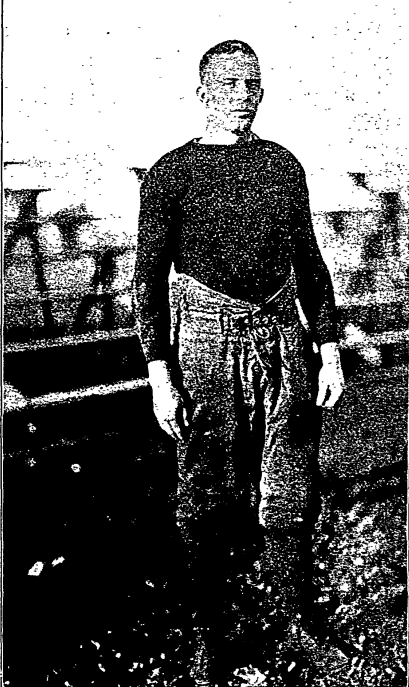
Emmett Keefe

- Arthur "Dutch" Bergman, halfback
- Harry Baujan, end
- Freeman Fitzgerald, captain and center/guard
- George "Ducky" Holmes, tackle
- Gerald Jones, guard
- Emmett Keefe
- Hollis King, tackle
- Grover Malone, halfback
- Arnold M. McInerny, tackle
- John Miller, halfback
- Hugh O'Donnell, center
- Mervin J. Phelan, quarterback
- Frank Rydzewski, tackle
- Ray C. Whipple, end

=== Coaches ===
- Head coach - Jesse Harper
- Assistant coach - Knute Rockne
- Freshman coach - Keith K. "Deak" Jones,
