= 1915 Kansas State Aggies football team =

American college football season

1915 Kansas State Aggies football
- Conference: Missouri Valley Conference
- Record: 3–4–1 (0–2–1 MVC)
- Head coach: John R. Bender (1st season)
- Home stadium: Ahearn Field

1915 Missouri Valley Conference football standings
	Conf.					Overall
Team	W		L		T	W		L		T
Nebraska $	4	–	0	–	0	8	–	0	–	0
Kansas	3	–	1	–	0	6	–	2	–	0
Iowa State	2	–	1	–	0	6	–	2	–	0
Washington University	1	–	1	–	0	3	–	2	–	0
Missouri	1	–	3	–	1	2	–	5	–	1
Drake	1	–	4	–	0	2	–	6	–	0
Kansas State	0	–	2	–	1	3	–	4	–	1
$ – Conference champion

The 1915 Kansas State Aggies football team represented Kansas State Agricultural College—now known as Kansas State University—as a member of the Missouri Valley Conference (MVC) during the 1915 college football season. Led by John R. Bender in his first and only season as head coach, the Aggies compiled an overall record of 3–4–1 with a mark of 0–2–1 in conference play, placing last out of seven teams in the MVC.

== Schedule ==
Date	Opponent	Site	Result	Source
October 1	Southwestern (KS)*	Ahearn Field; Manhattan, KS	W 9–0	
October 9	at Nebraska	Nebraska Field; Lincoln, NE (rivalry)	L 0–31	
October 15	at Kansas State Normal*	Emporia, KS	L 0–13	
October 23	Kansas^{†}	Ahearn Field; Manhattan, KS (rivalry)	L 7–19	
October 29	at Missouri	Rollins Field; Columbia, MO	T 0–0	
November 6	Friends*	Ahearn Field; Manhattan, KS	W 14–0	
November 12	at Washburn*	Topeka, KS	W 6–0	
November 19	Oklahoma*	Ahearn Field; Manhattan, KS	L 7–21	
*Non-conference game; ^{†}Homecoming
