= 1915 Baylor Bears football team =

American college football season

1915 Baylor Bears football
- Conference: Southwest Conference
- Record: 7–1 (3–0 SWC)
- Head coach: Charles Mosley (2nd season)
- Captain: Jack R. Norris
- Home stadium: Carroll Field; Cotton Palace

1915 Southwest Conference football standings
	Conf.					Overall
Team	W		L		T	W		L		T
Oklahoma $	3	–	0	–	0	10	–	0	–	0
Baylor	3	–	0	–	0	7	–	1	–	0
Texas A&M	1	–	1	–	0	6	–	2	–	0
Texas	2	–	2	–	0	6	–	3	–	0
Arkansas	1	–	1	–	0	4	–	2	–	1
Rice	1	–	2	–	0	5	–	3	–	0
Oklahoma A&M	0	–	3	–	0	4	–	5	–	1
Southwestern (TX)	0	–	2	–	0	4	–	3	–	0
Baylor forfeited claim to co-champion for using ineligible player.

The 1915 Baylor Bears football team represented Baylor University as a member of the Southwest Conference (SWC) during the 1915 college football season. Led by second-year head coach Charles Mosley, the Bears compiled an overall record of 7–1, with a mark of 3–0 in conference play. Baylor won a later-vacated Texas Intercollegiate Athletic Association Championship.

== Schedule ==
Date	Time	Opponent	Site	Result	Source
October 2		Howard Payne*	Carroll Field; Waco, TX	W 3–0	
October 8		at Rice	Rice Field; Houston, TX	W 26–0	
October 16		vs. Trinity (TX)*	Fair Park; Dallas, TX	W 49–0	
October 23		at Southwestern (TX)	Snyder Field; Georgetown, TX	W 10–0	
November 8		Sewanee*	Cotton Palace; Waco, TX	L 3–16	
November 13		Oklahoma A&M	Cotton Palace; Waco, TX	W 12–6	
November 20		Daniel Baker*	Cotton Palace; Waco, TX	W 34–0	
November 25	2:00 p.m.	TCU*^{†}	Carroll Field; Waco, TX (rivalry)	W 51–0	
*Non-conference game; ^{†}Homecoming; All times are in Central time
