= T. T. McConnell =

American football player, athletics coach and college athletics administrator

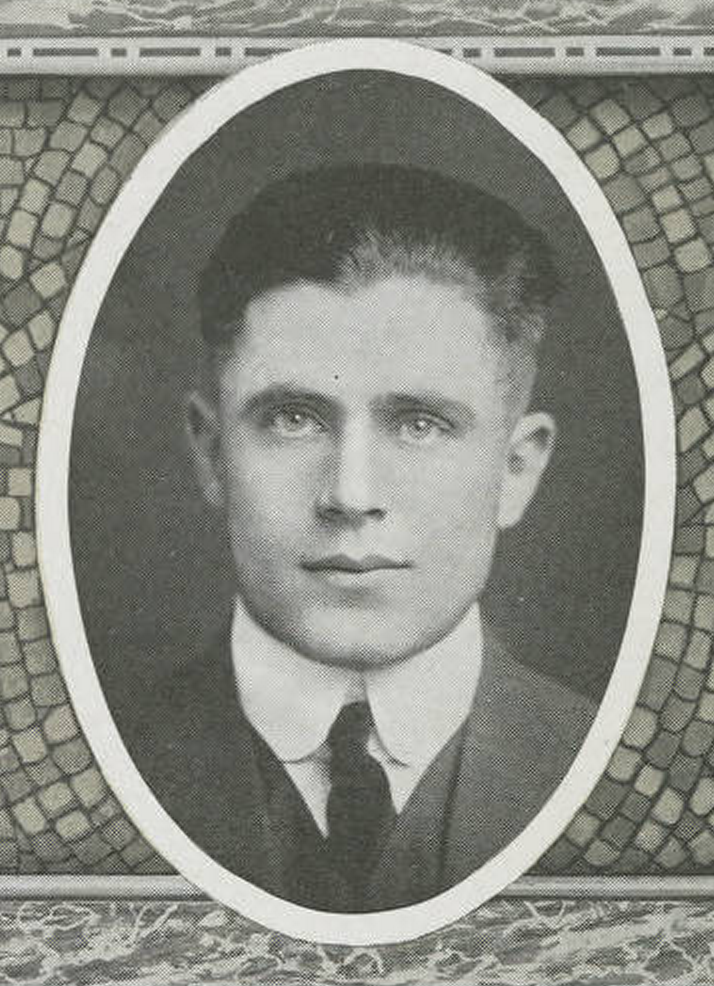
- McConnell pictured in Debris 1914 Purdue yearbook

Biographical details
- Born: August 26, 1888; Springfield, Missouri, U.S.
- Died: February 9, 1970 (aged 81); Springfield, Missouri, U.S.

Playing career

Football
- 1913: Purdue
- Position: Guard

Coaching career (HC unless noted)

Football
- 1914: Doane
- 1915–1916: Arkansas

Baseball
- 1916: Arkansas

Head coaching record
- Overall: 12–8–3 (football); 10–5 (baseball)

Thomas Thurmon (or Thurman) McConnell (August 26, 1888 – February 9, 1970) was an American football player, coach of football and baseball, and college athletics administrator. He served as the head football coach at Doane College in Nebraska in 1914 and at the University of Arkansas from 1915 to 1916, compiling a career college football record of 12–8–3. McConnell was also the head baseball coach at Arkansas in 1916, tallying a mark of 10–5.

McConnell was born in Springfield, Missouri in 1888. He was an alumnus of Purdue University, graduating in the class of 1914 with a BS in agriculture. McConnell died in 1970 in Springfield. His wife, Mary, died in 1986. They are both interred at Maple Park Cemetery in Springfield.

== Coaching career ==
=== Doane ===
McConnell was the 15th head football coach at Doane College in Crete, Nebraska and he held that position for the 1914 season. His coaching record at Doane was 4–2–2.

=== Arkansas ===
McConnell served as the head football coach at the University of Arkansas in 1915 and 1916.

=== Drury ===
McConnell also was director of athletics at Drury College in Missouri.

== Head coaching record ==
Year	Team	Overall	Conference	Standing	Bowl/playoffs
Doane Tigers (Independent) (1914)
1914	Doane	4–2–2			
Doane:		4–2–2			
Arkansas Razorbacks (Southwest Conference) (1915–1916)
1915	Arkansas	4–2–1	1–1	T–3rd	
1916	Arkansas	4–4	0–2	T–5th	
Arkansas:		8–6–1	1–3		
Total:		12–8–3			
