= 1915 Haskell Indians football team =

American college football season

1915 Haskell Indians football
- Conference: Independent
- Record: 5–5
- Head coach: A. R. Kennedy (5th season)

1915 Midwestern college football independents records
	Conf.			Overall
Team	W	L	T	W		L		T
Dubuque		–		7	–	0	–	0
Carleton		–		6	–	0	–	0
Wabash		–		7	–	0	–	1
Notre Dame		–		7	–	1	–	0
Grinnell		–		6	–	1	–	0
Michigan Agricultural		–		5	–	1	–	0
Western State Normal		–		5	–	1	–	0
South Dakota State		–		5	–	1	–	1
Heidelberg		–		5	–	2	–	1
Millikin		–		5	–	2	–	1
Nebraska Wesleyan		–		6	–	3	–	0
St. Mary's (OH)		–		3	–	2	–	0
Michigan State Normal		–		4	–	2	–	1
Doane		–		5	–	3	–	0
Marquette		–		4	–	2	–	2
South Dakota		–		4	–	2	–	2
Jamestown		–		3	–	2	–	1
Penn (IA)		–		4	–	3	–	0
Michigan		–		4	–	3	–	1
Saint Louis		–		4	–	3	–	1
Creighton		–		3	–	3	–	1
Haskell		–		3	–	3	–	0
Iowa State Teachers		–		3	–	3	–	0
North Dakota Agricultural		–		3	–	3	–	0
St. Thomas (MN)		–		2	–	2	–	1
Hanover		–		2	–	4	–	0
Lake Forest		–		2	–	4	–	0
Northern Illinois State		–		2	–	5	–	1
Lawrence		–		2	–	5	–	0
Earlham		–		2	–	6	–	0
Detroit		–		1	–	5	–	0
Butler		–		1	–	6	–	0
Lincoln (MO)		–		0	–	2	–	0

The 1915 Haskell Indians football team was an American football team that represented the Haskell Indian Institute (now known as Haskell Indian Nations University) as an independent during the 1915 college football season. In its fifth and final season under head coach A. R. Kennedy, Haskell compiled a 5–5 record and was outscored by a total of 150 to 75. Its victories included a game Oklahoma A&M; its losses included games against Illinois, Notre Dame, Texas A&M, and Chicago.

== Schedule ==
Date	Opponent	Site	Result	Attendance	Source
September 25	Kansas Wesleyan	Lawrence, KS	W 7–0		
October 2	at Illinois	Illinois Field; Champaign, IL	L 0–36	3,193	
October 9	at Notre Dame	Cartier Field; Notre Dame, IN	L 0–34		
October 15	Baker	Lawrence, KS	W 6–0		
October 23	at Creighton	Creighton Field; Omaha, NE	W 10–3		
October 30	vs. Texas A&M	Fair Park; Dallas, TX	L 7–21	8,000	
November 6	at Chicago	Stagg Field; Chicago, IL	L 0–35		
November 12	at Kansas State Normal	Emporia, KS	W 21–7		
November 20	Oklahoma A&M	Haskell Field; Lawrence, KS	W 21–7		
November 25	at Kendall	Association Park; Tulsa, OK	L 3–7		
