= 1915 Texas A&M Aggies football team =

American college football season

1915 Texas A&M Aggies football
- Conference: Southwest Conference
- Record: 6–2 (1–1 SWC)
- Head coach: Edwin Harlan (1st season)
- Home stadium: Kyle Field

1915 Southwest Conference football standings
	Conf.					Overall
Team	W		L		T	W		L		T
Oklahoma $	3	–	0	–	0	10	–	0	–	0
Baylor	3	–	0	–	0	7	–	1	–	0
Texas A&M	1	–	1	–	0	6	–	2	–	0
Texas	2	–	2	–	0	6	–	3	–	0
Arkansas	1	–	1	–	0	4	–	2	–	1
Rice	1	–	2	–	0	5	–	3	–	0
Oklahoma A&M	0	–	3	–	0	4	–	5	–	1
Southwestern (TX)	0	–	2	–	0	4	–	3	–	0
Baylor forfeited claim to co-champion for using ineligible player.

The 1915 Texas A&M Aggies football team represented the Agricultural and Mechanical College of Texas (now known as Texas A&M University) as a member of the Southwest Conference (SWC) during the 1915 college football season. Led by first-year head coach Edwin Harlan, the Aggies compiled an overall record of 6–2, with a mark of 1–1 in conference play. Texas A&M played home games at Kyle Field in College Station, Texas.

== Schedule ==
Date	Opponent	Site	Result	Attendance	Source
October 1	Austin*	Kyle Field; College Station, TX	W 40–0		
October 8	Trinity (TX)*	Kyle Field; College Station, TX	W 62–0		
October 15	at TCU*	Y. M. C. A. Athletic Park; Fort Worth, TX (rivalry)	W 13–10		
October 22	Missouri Mines*	Kyle Field; College Station, TX	W 33–3		
October 30	vs. Haskell*	Fair Park; Dallas, TX	W 21–7	8,000	
November 8	at Rice	West End Park; Houston, TX	L 0–7		
November 19	Texas	Kyle Field; College Station, TX (rivalry)	W 13–0	8,000	
November 25	Mississippi A&M*	Kyle Field; College Station, TX	L 0–7		
*Non-conference game
