= 1915 Arkansas Razorbacks football team =

American college football season

1915 Arkansas Razorbacks football
- Conference: Southwest Conference
- Record: 4–2–1 (1–1 SWC)
- Head coach: T. T. McConnell (1st season)
- Captain: James Rudd
- Home stadium: The Hill

1915 Southwest Conference football standings
	Conf.					Overall
Team	W		L		T	W		L		T
Oklahoma $	3	–	0	–	0	10	–	0	–	0
Baylor	3	–	0	–	0	7	–	1	–	0
Texas A&M	1	–	1	–	0	6	–	2	–	0
Texas	2	–	2	–	0	6	–	3	–	0
Arkansas	1	–	1	–	0	4	–	2	–	1
Rice	1	–	2	–	0	5	–	3	–	0
Oklahoma A&M	0	–	3	–	0	4	–	5	–	1
Southwestern (TX)	0	–	2	–	0	4	–	3	–	0
Baylor forfeited claim to co-champion for using ineligible player.

The 1915 Arkansas Razorbacks football team represented the University of Arkansas in the Southwest Conference (SWC) during the 1915 college football season. In their first year under head coach T. T. McConnell, the Razorbacks compiled a 4–2–1 record (1–1 against SWC opponents), finished in fifth place in the SWC, and outscored their opponents by a combined total of 121 to 52.

== Schedule ==
Date	Time	Opponent	Site	Result	Attendance	Source
October 2		Hendrix*	The Hill; Fayetteville, AR	W 41–0		
October 9		Ouachita*	The Hill; Fayetteville, AR	W 12–7		
October 23		vs. Oklahoma A&M	League Park; Fort Smith, AR	W 14–9	3,500	
October 30	3:00 p.m.	at Saint Louis*	Sportsman's Park; St. Louis, MO	T 0–0		
November 6		vs. LSU*	State Fair Grounds; Shreveport, LA (rivalry)	L 7–13		
November 13		Oklahoma	The Hill; Fayetteville, AR	L 0–23		
November 25		Oklahoma Mines*	The Hill; Fayetteville, AR	W 45–0		
*Non-conference game
