= 1915 Rice Owls football team =

American college football season

1915 Rice Owls football
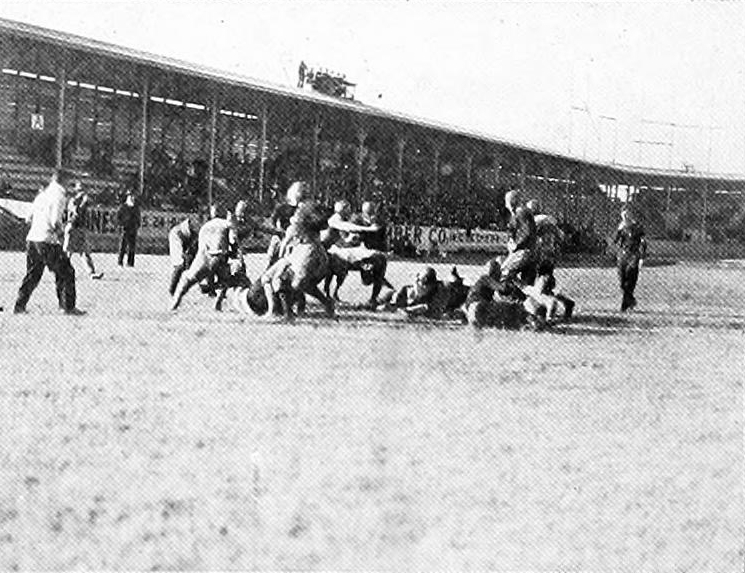
- The 1915 Rice Owls team playing at West End Park, Houston
- Conference: Southwest Conference
- Record: 5–3 (1–2 SWC)
- Head coach: Philip Arbuckle (4th season)
- Captain: W. M. Standish
- Home stadium: Rice Field, West End Park

1915 Southwest Conference football standings
	Conf.					Overall
Team	W		L		T	W		L		T
Oklahoma $	3	–	0	–	0	10	–	0	–	0
Baylor	3	–	0	–	0	7	–	1	–	0
Texas A&M	1	–	1	–	0	6	–	2	–	0
Texas	2	–	2	–	0	6	–	3	–	0
Arkansas	1	–	1	–	0	4	–	2	–	1
Rice	1	–	2	–	0	5	–	3	–	0
Oklahoma A&M	0	–	3	–	0	4	–	5	–	1
Southwestern (TX)	0	–	2	–	0	4	–	3	–	0
Baylor forfeited claim to co-champion for using ineligible player.

The 1915 Rice Owls football team was an American football team that represented Rice Institute as a member of the Southwest Conference (SWC) during the 1915 college football season. In its fourth season under head coach Philip Arbuckle, the team compiled a 5–3 record (1–2 against SWC opponents) and was outscored by a total of 143 to 122.

== Schedule ==
Date	Opponent	Site	Result	Source
October 2	Trinity (TX)*	Rice Field; Houston, TX	W 46–0	
October 8	Baylor	Rice Field; Houston, TX	L 0–26	
October 16	at Texas	Clark Field; Austin, TX (rivalry)	L 0–59	
October 23	Daniel Baker*	West End Park; Houston, TX	W 28–0	
October 30	TCU*	Rice Field; Houston, TX	W 33–3	
November 8	Texas A&M	West End Park; Houston, TX	W 7–0	
November 17	LSU*	West End Park; Houston, TX	W 6–0	
November 27	Notre Dame*	West End Park; Houston, TX	L 2–55	
*Non-conference game
