= 1915 Texas Longhorns football team =

American college football season

1915 Texas Longhorns football
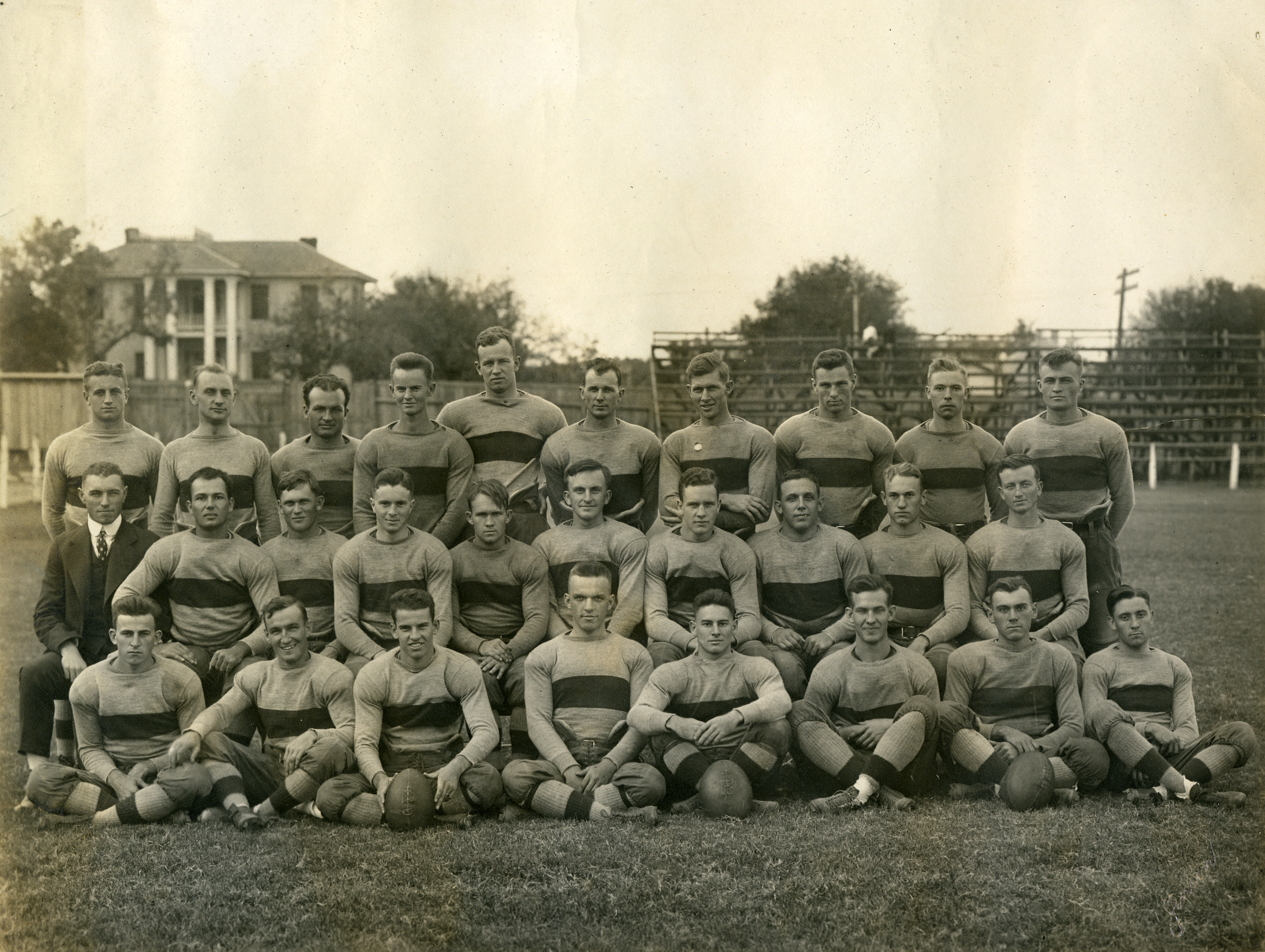
- Conference: Southwest Conference
- Record: 6–3 (2–2 SWC)
- Head coach: Dave Allerdice (5th season)
- Captain: K. L. Berry
- Home stadium: Clark Field

1915 Southwest Conference football standings
	Conf.					Overall
Team	W		L		T	W		L		T
Oklahoma $	3	–	0	–	0	10	–	0	–	0
Baylor	3	–	0	–	0	7	–	1	–	0
Texas A&M	1	–	1	–	0	6	–	2	–	0
Texas	2	–	2	–	0	6	–	3	–	0
Arkansas	1	–	1	–	0	4	–	2	–	1
Rice	1	–	2	–	0	5	–	3	–	0
Oklahoma A&M	0	–	3	–	0	4	–	5	–	1
Southwestern (TX)	0	–	2	–	0	4	–	3	–	0
Baylor forfeited claim to co-champion for using ineligible player.

The 1915 Texas Longhorns football team was an American football team that represented the University of Texas (now known as the University of Texas at Austin) as a member of the Southwest Conference (SWC) during the 1913 college football season. In their fifth year under head coach Dave Allerdice, the team compiled an overall record of 6–3, and 2–2 in the SWC.

== Schedule ==
Date	Opponent	Site	Result	Attendance	Source
October 2	TCU*	Clark Field; Austin, TX (rivalry)	W 72–0		
October 9	Daniel Baker*	Clark Field; Austin, TX	W 92–0		
October 16	Rice	Clark Field; Austin, TX (rivalry)	W 59–0		
October 23	vs. Oklahoma	Fair Park Stadium; Dallas, TX (rivalry)	L 13–14	12,000	
October 30	Southwestern (TX)	Clark Field; Austin, TX	W 45–0		
November 6	vs. Sewanee*	West End Park; Houston, TX	W 27–6		
November 13	Alabama*	Clark Field; Austin, TX	W 20–0		
November 19	at Texas A&M	Kyle Field; College Station, TX (rivalry)	L 0–13	8,000	
November 25	Notre Dame*	Clark Field; Austin, TX	L 7–36		
*Non-conference game
