= 1915 Oklahoma A&M Aggies football team =

American college football season

1915 Oklahoma A&M Aggies football
- Conference: Southwest Conference
- Record: 4–5–1 (0–3 SWC)
- Head coach: John G. Griffith (1st season)
- Home stadium: Lewis Field

1915 Southwest Conference football standings
	Conf.					Overall
Team	W		L		T	W		L		T
Oklahoma $	3	–	0	–	0	10	–	0	–	0
Baylor	3	–	0	–	0	7	–	1	–	0
Texas A&M	1	–	1	–	0	6	–	2	–	0
Texas	2	–	2	–	0	6	–	3	–	0
Arkansas	1	–	1	–	0	4	–	2	–	1
Rice	1	–	2	–	0	5	–	3	–	0
Oklahoma A&M	0	–	3	–	0	4	–	5	–	1
Southwestern (TX)	0	–	2	–	0	4	–	3	–	0
Baylor forfeited claim to co-champion for using ineligible player.

The 1915 Oklahoma A&M Aggies football team represented Oklahoma A&M College in the 1915 college football season. This was the 15th year of football at A&M and the first under John G. Griffith. The Aggies played their home games at Lewis Field in Stillwater, Oklahoma. They finished the season 4–5–1 overall and 0–3 in the Southwest Conference.

Oklahoma A&M joined the Southwest Conference (SWC) in 1915. The Aggies were charter SWC members, along with five schools from the state of Texas (The University of Texas, Texas A&M, Baylor, Rice, and Southwestern (TX)), one from Arkansas, (University of Arkansas), and rival Oklahoma.

== Schedule ==
Date	Time	Opponent	Site	Result	Attendance	Source
October 2		at Missouri*	Rollins Field; Columbia, MO	L 6–13		
October 8		Friends*	Lewis Field; Stillwater, OK	W 6–0		
October 15		Kendall*	Lewis Field; Stillwater, OK (rivalry)	T 0–0		
October 23		vs. Arkansas	League Park; Fort Smith, AR	L 9–14	3,500	
October 29		Baker*	Lewis Field; Stillwater, OK	W 30–7		
November 5		Northwestern Territorial Normal*	Lewis Field; Stillwater, OK	W 77–0		
November 13		at Baylor	Cotton Palace; Waco, TX	L 6–12		
November 16	3:30 p.m.	at TCU*	Y. M. C. A. Athletic Park; Fort Worth, TX	W 13–0		
November 19		at Haskell*	Haskell Field; Lawrence, KS	L 7–21		
November 25		vs. Oklahoma	Oklahoma City, OK (Bedlam)	L 7–26	7,000	
*Non-conference game
