= 1915 Kansas Jayhawks football team =

American college football season

1915 Kansas Jayhawks football
- Conference: Missouri Valley Conference
- Record: 6–2 (3–1 MVC)
- Head coach: Herman Olcott (1st season)
- Captain: D. S. James
- Home stadium: McCook Field

1915 Missouri Valley Conference football standings
	Conf.					Overall
Team	W		L		T	W		L		T
Nebraska $	4	–	0	–	0	8	–	0	–	0
Kansas	3	–	1	–	0	6	–	2	–	0
Iowa State	2	–	1	–	0	6	–	2	–	0
Washington University	1	–	1	–	0	3	–	2	–	0
Missouri	1	–	3	–	1	2	–	5	–	1
Drake	1	–	4	–	0	2	–	6	–	0
Kansas State	0	–	2	–	1	3	–	4	–	1
$ – Conference champion

The 1915 Kansas Jayhawks football team was an American football team that represented the University of Kansas as a member of the Missouri Valley Conference (MVC) during the 1915 college football season. In their first season under head coach Herman Olcott, the Jayhawks achieved a 6–2 record (3–1 against conference opponents), finished in second place in the MVC, and outscored opponents by a total of 153 to 79. The Jayhawks played their home games at McCook Field in Lawrence, Kansas. D. S. James was the team captain.

== Schedule ==
Date	Opponent	Site	Result	Attendance	Source
October 2	William Jewell*	McCook Field; Lawrence, KS	W 20–0		
October 9	Kansas State Normal*	McCook Field; Lawrence, KS	W 21–3		
October 16	Drake	McCook Field; Lawrence, KS	W 30–7		
October 23	at Kansas State	Ahearn Field; Manhattan, KS (rivalry)	W 19–7		
October 30	at Oklahoma*	Boyd Field; Norman, OK	L 14–23		
November 6	Washburn*	McCook Field; Lawrence, KS	W 41–0		
November 13	Nebraska^{†}	McCook Field; Lawrence, KS (rivalry)	L 0–33	10,000	
November 27	at Missouri	Rollins Field; Columbia, MO (rivalry)	W 8–6	10,500	
*Non-conference game; ^{†}Homecoming
