= Linda Waggoner =

American historian

- Occupations: Independent researcher and author
- Writing career
- Subjects: Native American history and anthropology

Linda M. Waggoner is an independent researcher and author whose work focuses on Native American history and anthropology. She has written about Red Wing, William Henry Dietz (reporting that he passing as Native American), the Ho-Chunk Nation of Wisconsin, and Angel De Cora.

Waggoner and her work has been featured in the San Antonio, New Mexico, ESPN.com, History Nebraska, the Baltimore Sun, The Washington Post, and on Twin Cities PBS.

== Career ==
Her work around William Henry Dietz is considered important in increasing interest in the Native American mascot controversy. She has been a guest lecturer at the Wisconsin Historical Society, National Museum of the American Indian and the Grace Hudson Museum. She is a former lecturer in Multicultural Studies at Sonoma State University.

== Personal life ==
Waggoner lives in California.

== Selected works ==
- Starring Red Wing! : The Incredible Career of Lilian M. St. Cyr, the First Native American Film Star. Lincoln: Bison Books/University of Nebraska Press (2019). ISBN 978-1-4962-1559-8
- "On Trial: The Washington R*dskins' Wily Mascot: Coach William "Lone Star" Deitz". Montana The Magazine of Western History (2013).
- Fire Light: The Life of Angel De Cora, Winnebago Artist. Norman: University of Oklahoma Press (2008). ISBN 0806139544
- Editor. "Neither White Men Nor Indians": Affidavits from the Winnebago Mixed-blood Claim Commissions, Prairie Du Chien, Wisconsin, 1838–1839. Roseville: Park Genealogical Books (2002). ISBN 0915709953
