= Joe Brown (sculptor) =

American sculptor (1909–1985)

- Born: March 20, 1909; Philadelphia, Pennsylvania, U.S.
- Died: March 14, 1985 (aged 75); Philadelphia, Pennsylvania, U.S.
- Education: South Philadelphia High School, Temple University
- Known for: sculpture, playground design

Joe Brown (March 20, 1909 – March 14, 1985) was an American figurative sculptor, specializing in athletes. His work was part of the sculpture event in the art competition at the 1936 Summer Olympics. Later in his career, he also worked as a playground designer.

== Career ==
The son of Russian immigrants, he grew up in South Philadelphia and graduated from South Philadelphia High School in 1926. A gifted athlete, he won a 1927 football scholarship to Temple University. He left before graduation, and briefly worked as a professional boxer. He made extra money as an artists' model, and became interested in studying sculpture. He served a 7-year apprenticeship under University of Pennsylvania professor and sculptor R. Tait McKenzie.

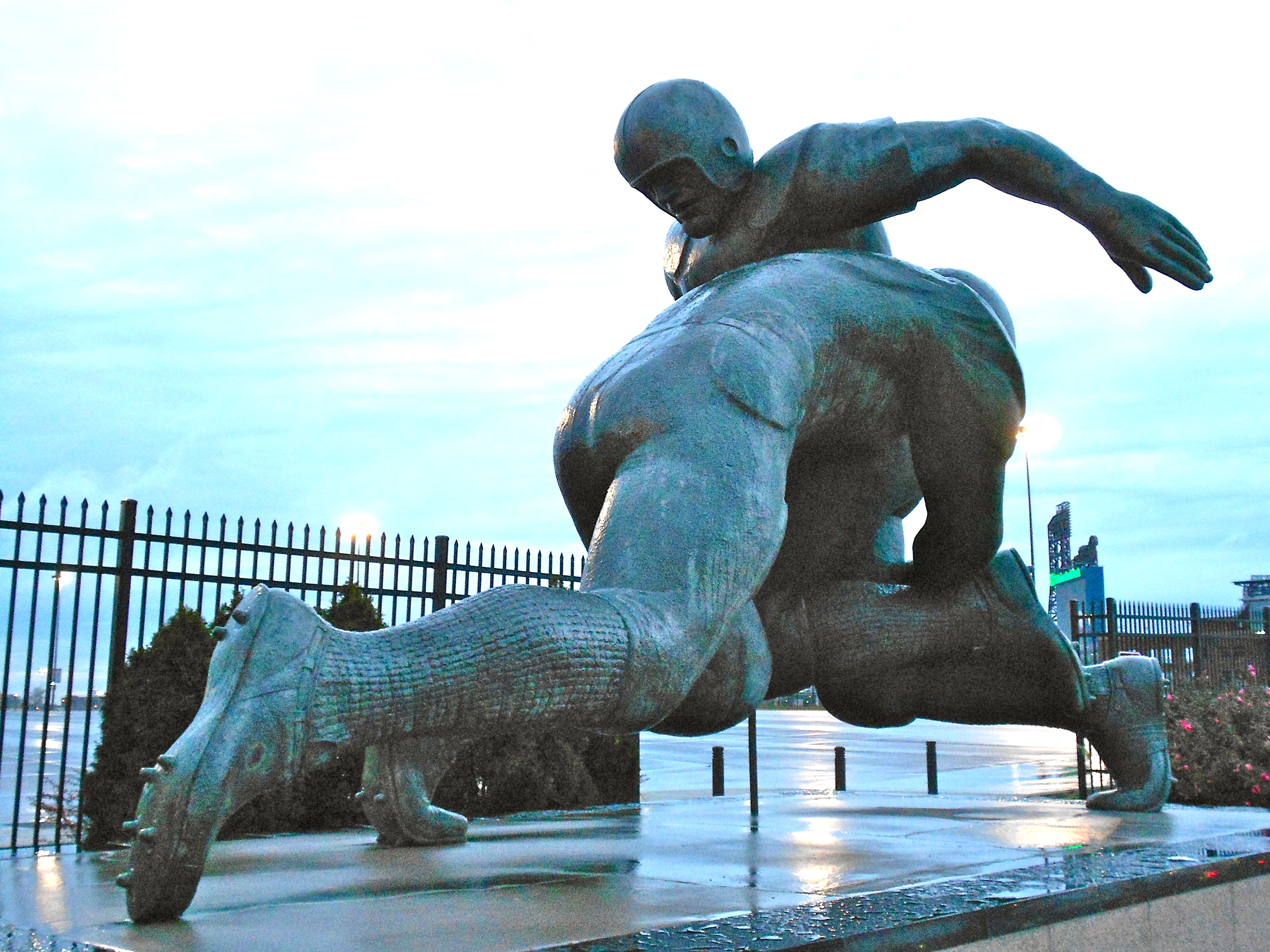
Tackle at Citizens Bank Park

Brown became the boxing coach at Princeton University in 1937, continuing until the early 1960s. He began teaching a sculpting course in 1939, became a resident artist at the university, and was made a full professor of art in 1962. In 1955, he exhibited his sculpture at Lehigh University with works by Jose deRivera and William H. "Lone Star" Dietz in an exhibition arranged by Francis Quirk. He continued teaching at Princeton until his 1977 retirement.

In 1955, he exhibited at Lehigh University with William Dietz and Jose de Rivera in an exhibition curated by Francis Quirk.

He created more than 400 works - statuettes, portrait busts, and sculptures. Examples are on many college campuses, and in the collections of the Pennsylvania Academy of the Fine Arts, the National Academy of Design, Princeton University Art Museum, Yale University Art Gallery, the John F. Kennedy Presidential Library, and the National Art Museum of Sport. A number of his pieces may be seen in the public areas of the Inn at Penn in Philadelphia.

While at Princeton in 1950, he began experimenting with structures for children to engage in active, cooperative play, which was a radical shift in thinking at the time.

Brown appeared as himself on the November 5, 1962 episode of the game show To Tell the Truth. He received three of four possible votes.

== Selected sculptures ==
=== Statuettes ===
- Duke Kahanamoku (1940). Duke Kahanamoku won gold medals in swimming at the 1912 and 1920 Olympic Games.
- Jack Kelly (1942). Jack Kelly won gold medals in rowing at the 1920 and 1924 Olympic Games.
- Jesse Owens (1942). Jesse Owens won 4 gold medals in track & field at the 1936 Olympic Games.
- Pieta (1944). An exhausted boxer cradled by the referee. Winner of National Academy of Design's Barnett Prize.
- Huddie Ledbetter (Leadbelly) (1948–49), Rock and Roll Hall of Fame, Cleveland, Ohio. Huddie Ledbetter was a blues guitarist and jazz pioneer.
- Bill Bradley (1965). Bill Bradley was a member of the U.S. basketball team that won the gold medal at the 1964 Olympic Games.

=== Portrait busts ===
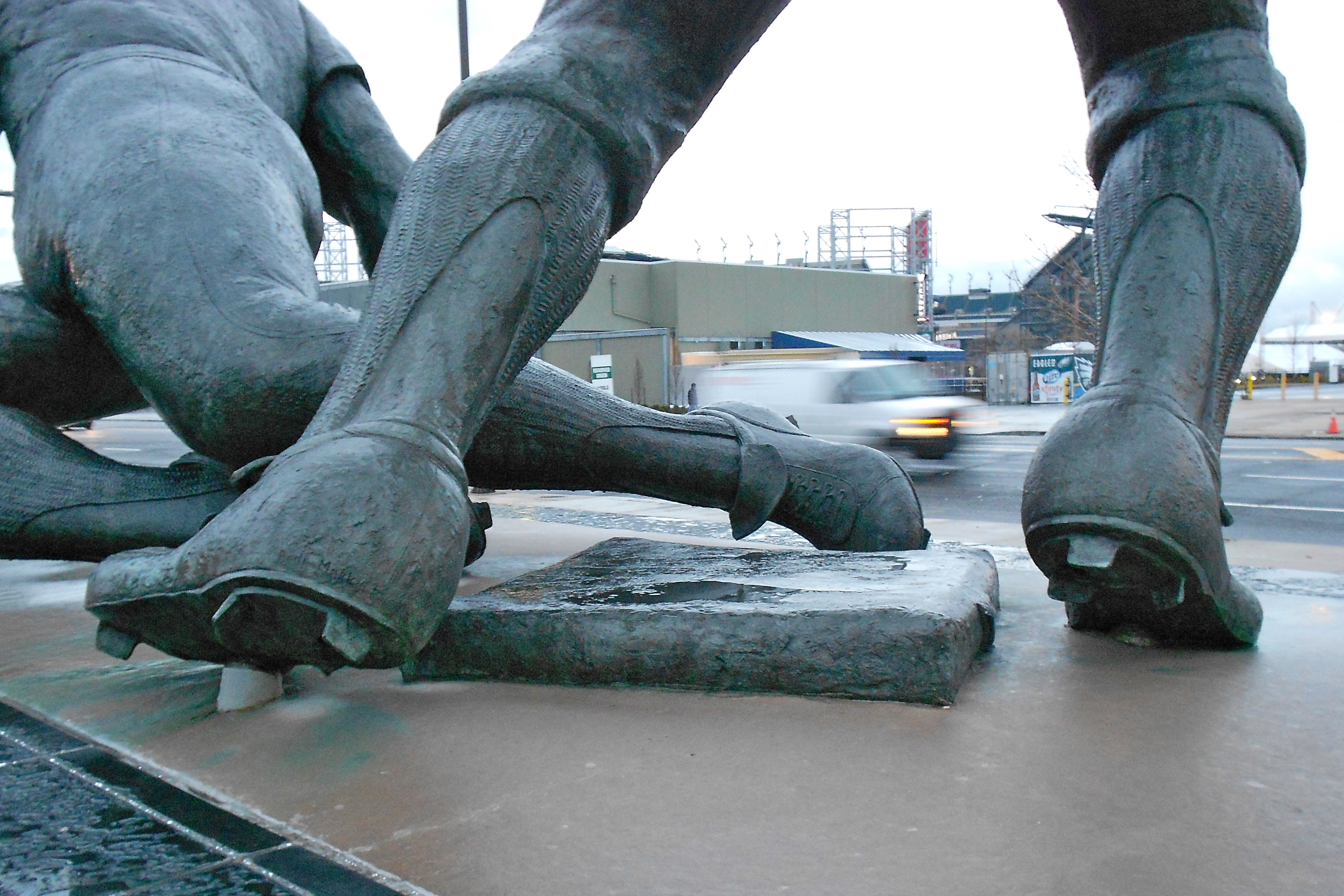
Play at Second Base, showing the detailed footwork of the game

- Bust of Robert Frost (1953), Jones Library, Amherst, Massachusetts.
- Bust of Louis Brandeis (1961), Harvard University Law School, Cambridge, Massachusetts.
- Bust of John Steinbeck (1964).

=== Larger-than-life ===
- The Runner (1964), Johns Hopkins University, Baltimore, Maryland.
- The Discus Thrower (1964), Johns Hopkins University, Baltimore, Maryland.
- Gymnasts (Two Athletes) (1969), McGonigle Hall, Temple University, Philadelphia, Pennsylvania.
- Benjamin Franklin - Craftsman (1981), Broad Street & John F. Kennedy Boulevard, Philadelphia, Pennsylvania.

==== Veterans Stadium ====
Four of Brown's sculptures graced Veterans Stadium from 1976 to 2003. Removed prior to the 2004 demolition, the sculptures were restored and relocated in 2005. They are now located near Citizens Bank Park, Philadelphia, Pennsylvania.

- Punter (1974)
- Full-Swing (The Batter) (1974)
- Tackle (1974)
- Play at Second Base (1974)

== Gallery ==
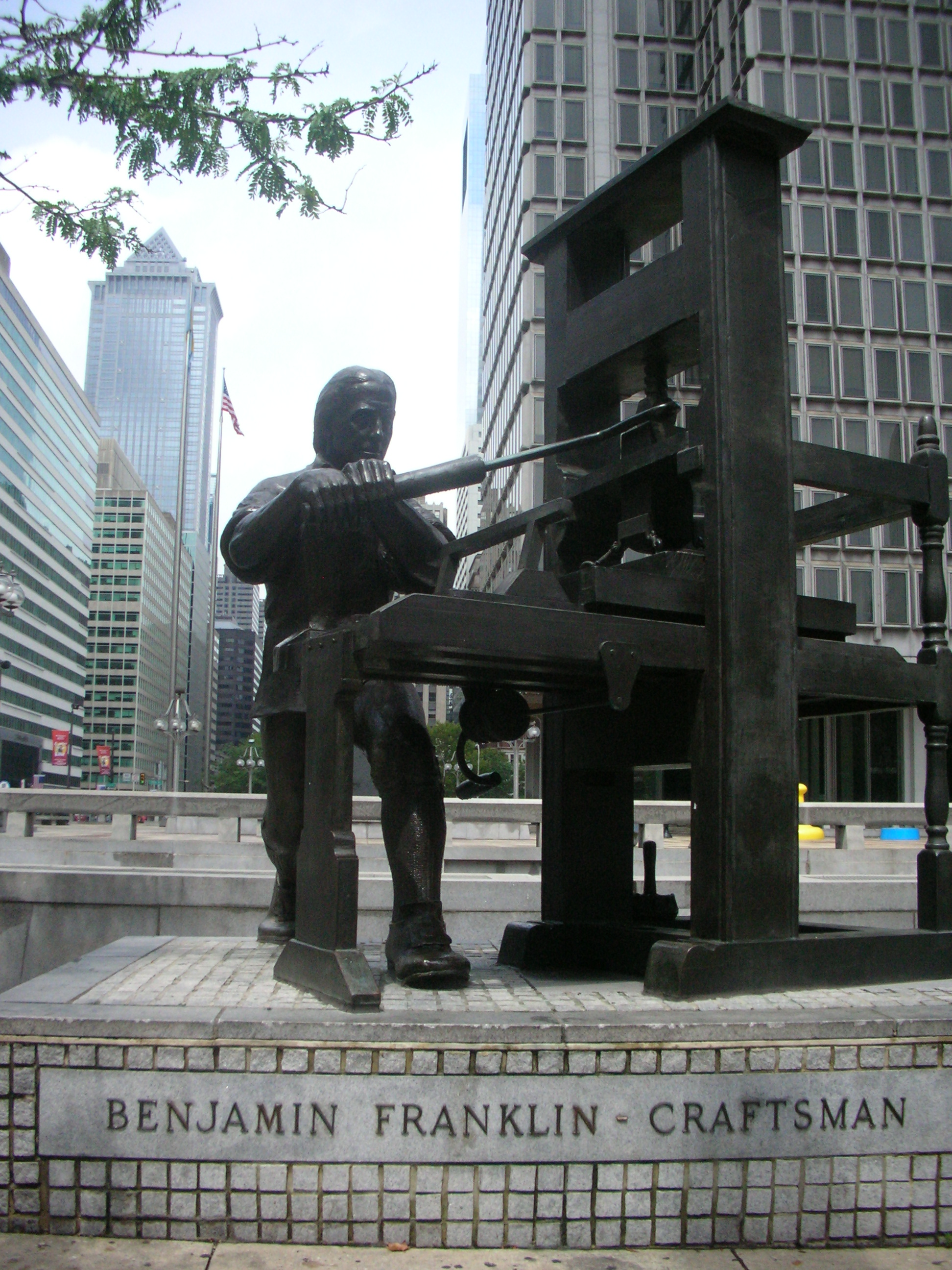
Benjamin Franklin - Craftsman (1981), Philadelphia, PA.

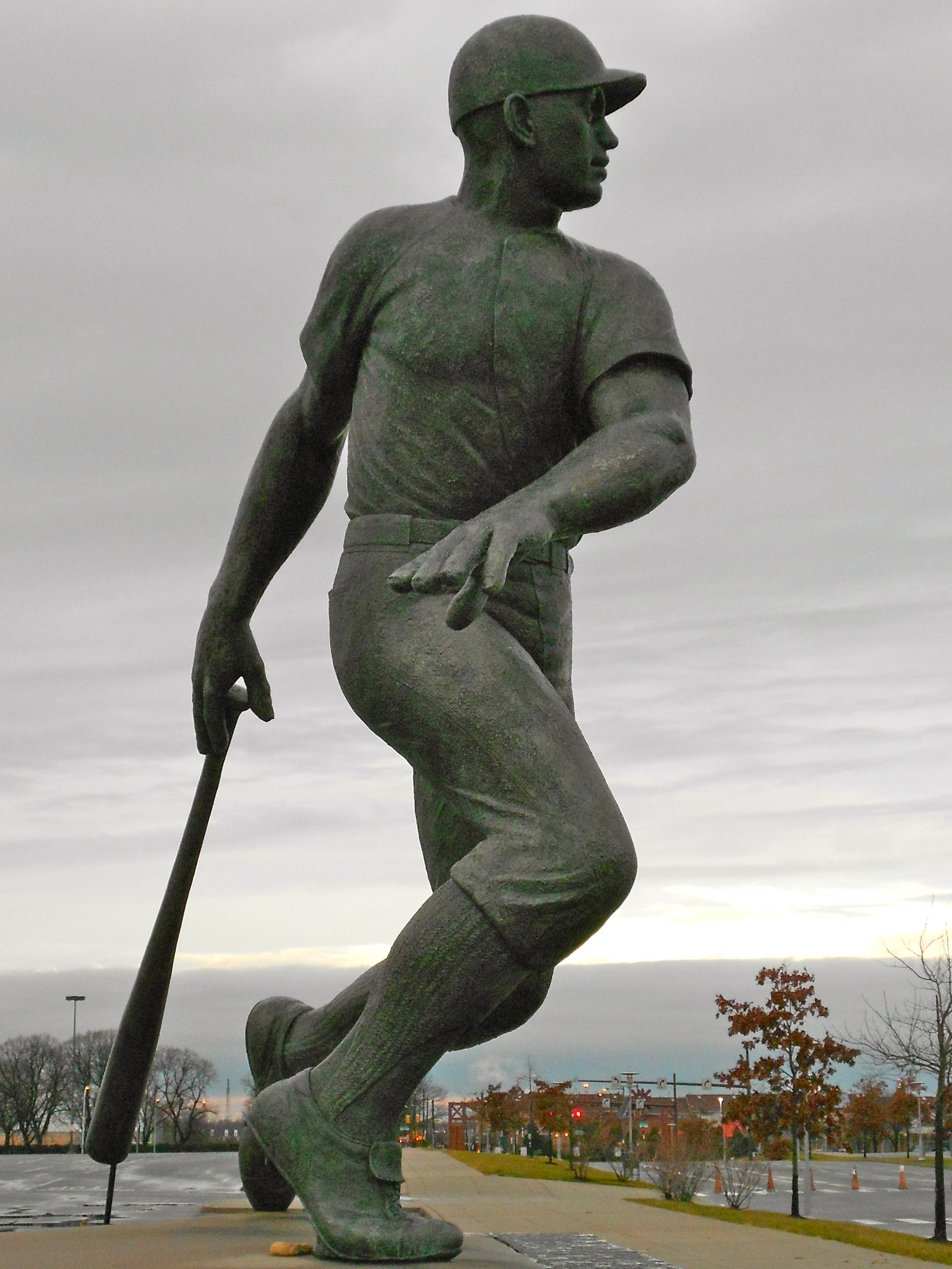
Full-Swing at Citizens Bank Park.

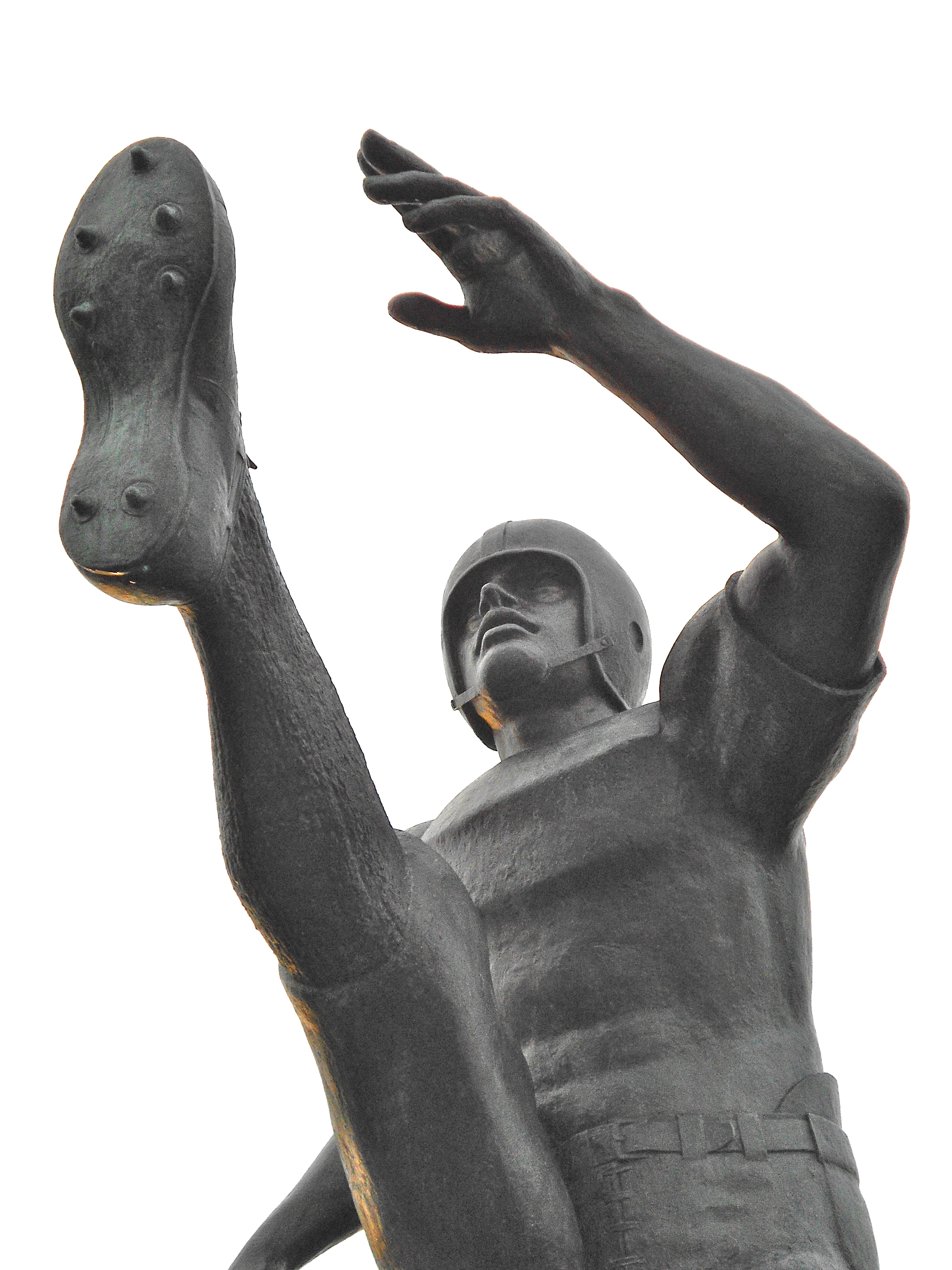
Punter at Citizens Bank Park.

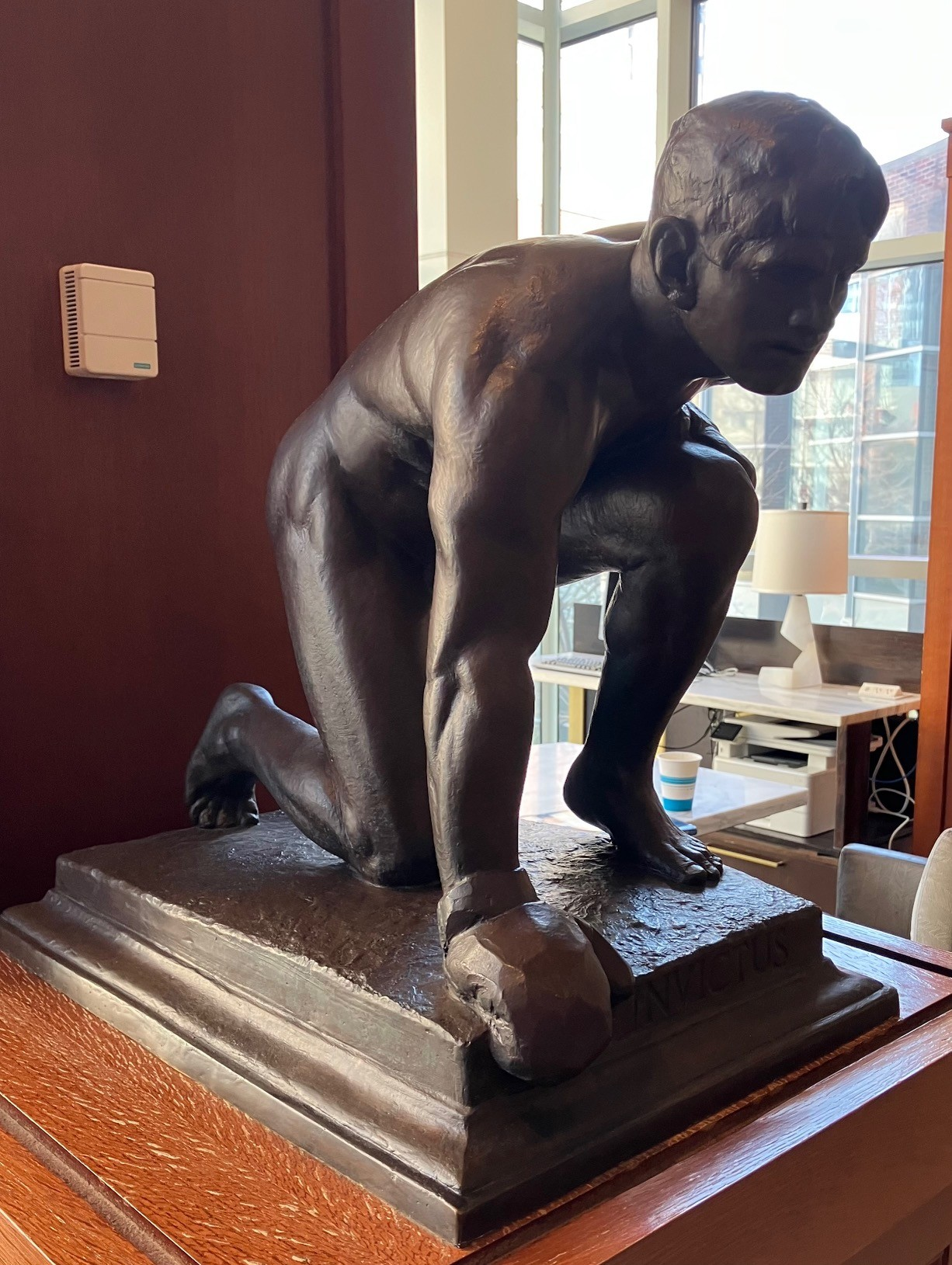
Sculpture by Joe Brown at the Inn at Penn in Philadelphia

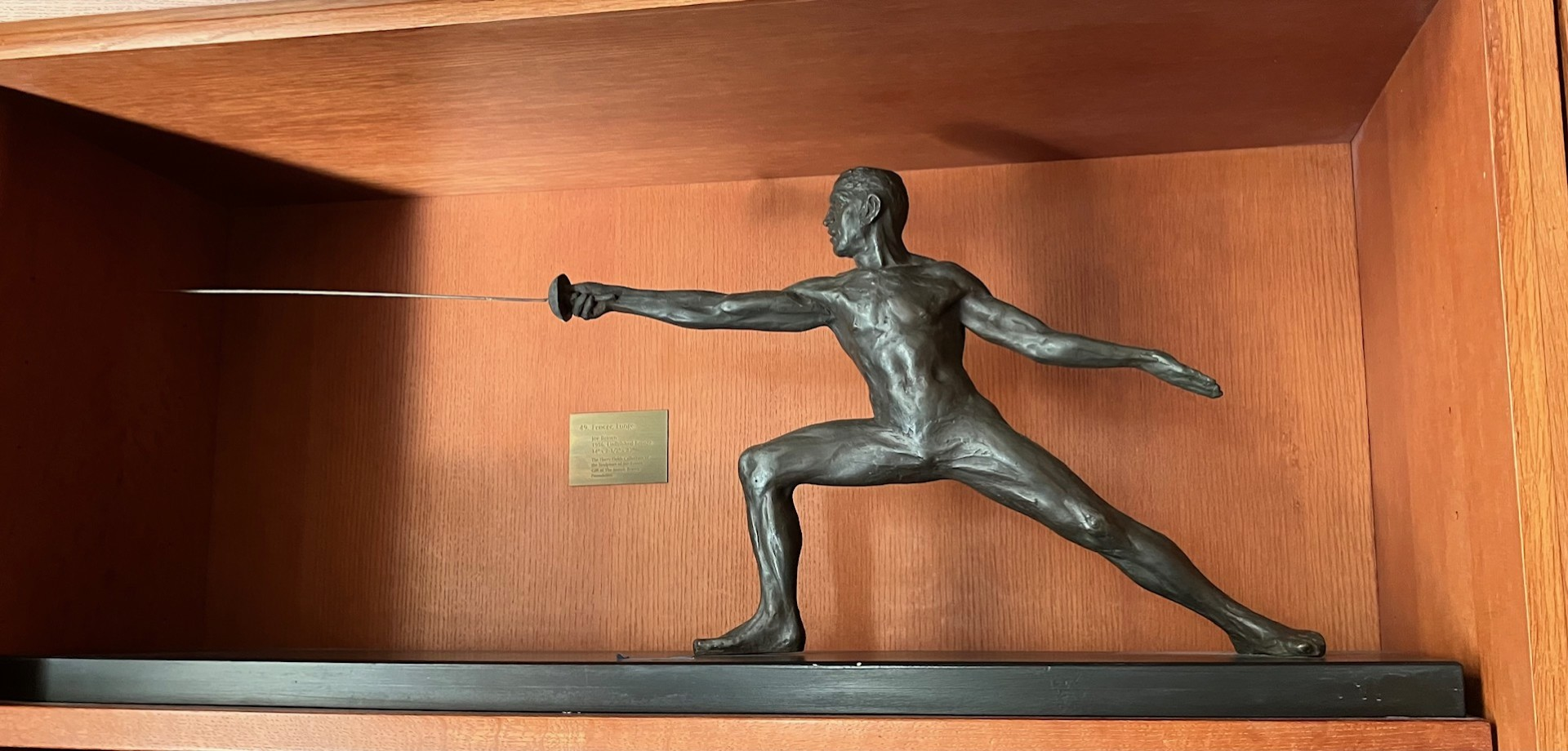
Joe Brown Sculpture of a Fencer Lunging at the Inn at Penn

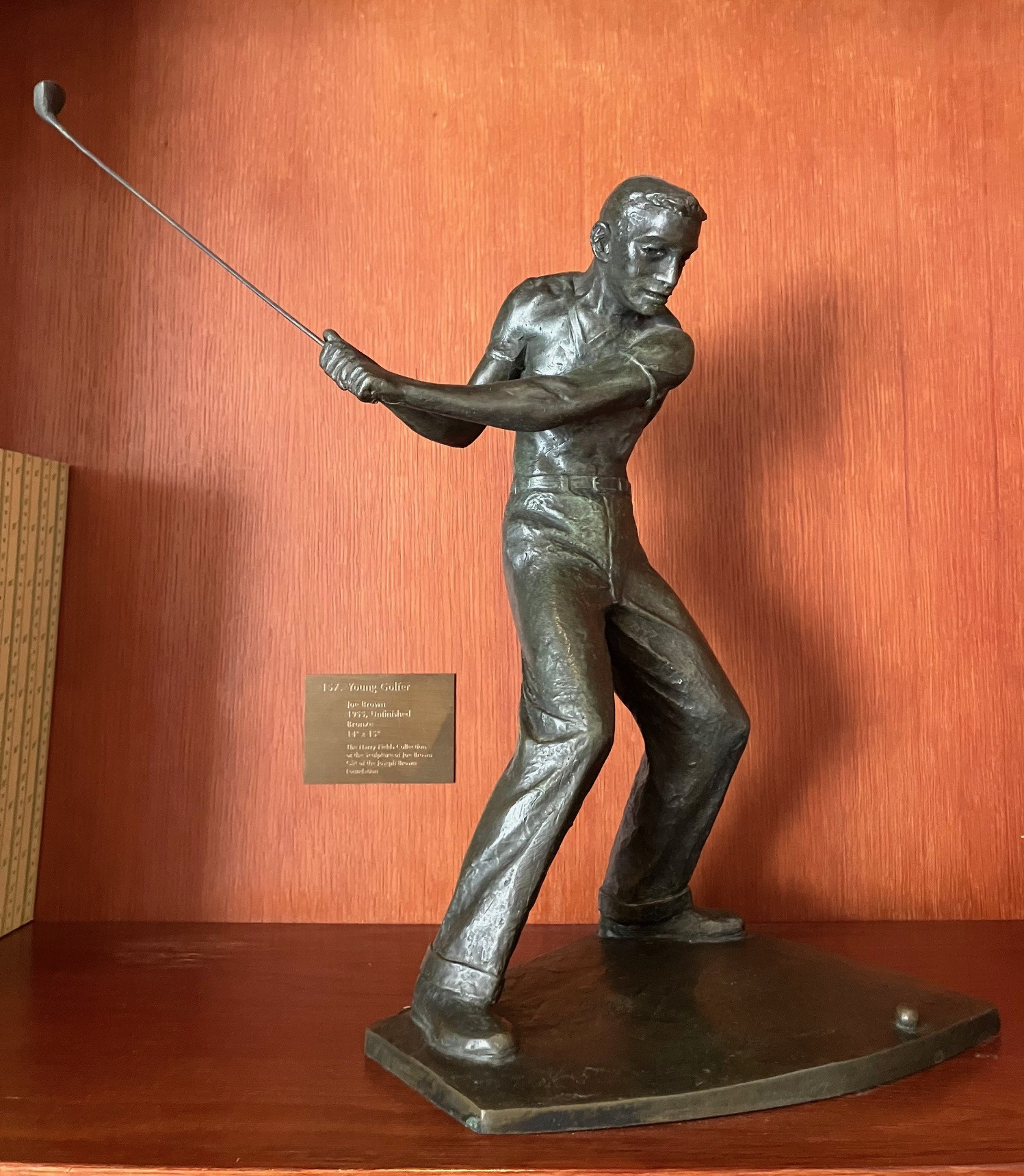
Young Golfer sculpture by Joe Brown at the Inn at Penn
