= 1915 Washington State football team =

American college football season

1915 Washington State football
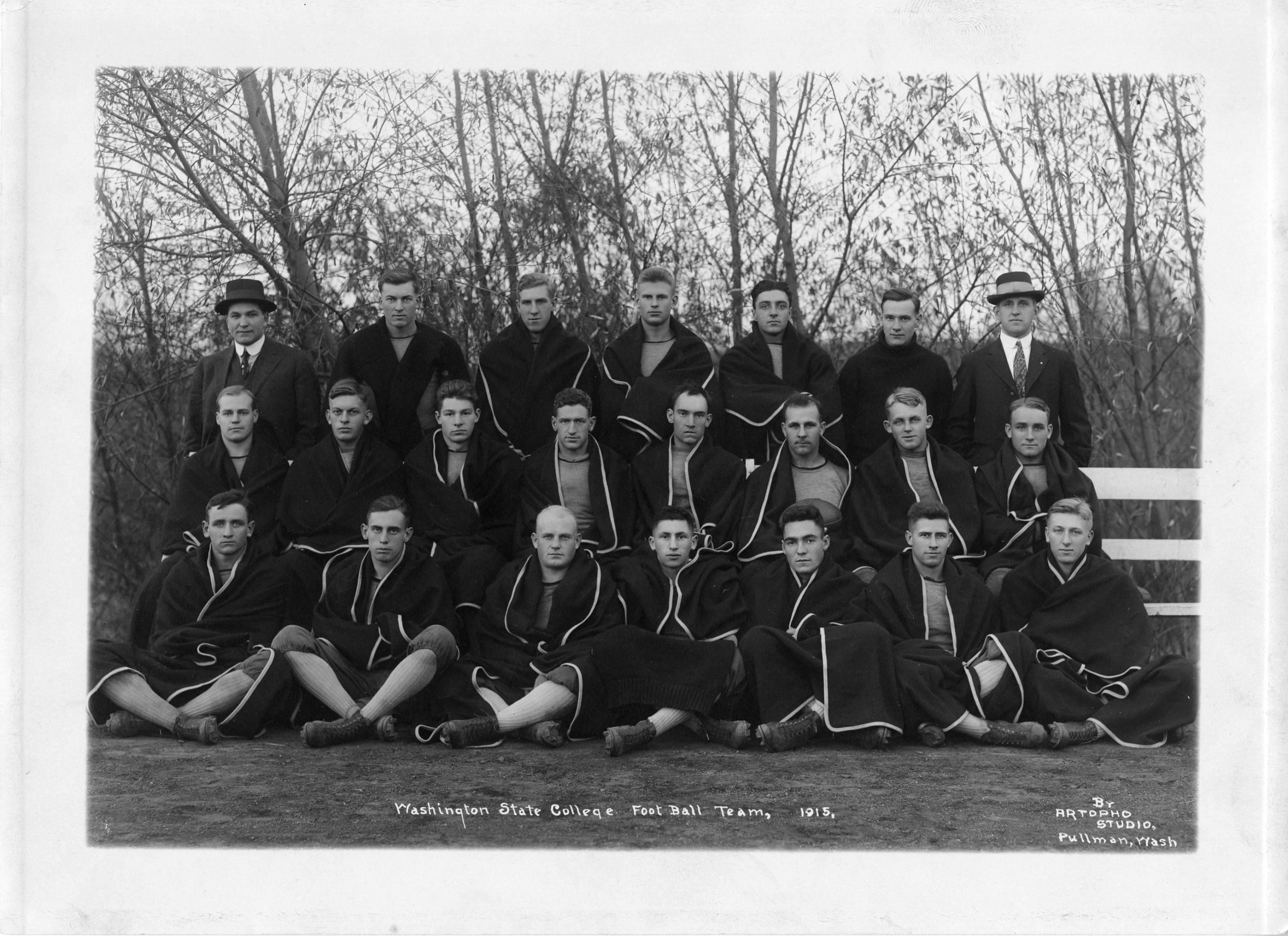

Northwest Conference co-champion Rose Bowl champion

Rose Bowl, W 14–0 vs. Brown
- Conference: Northwest Conference
- Record: 7–0 (4–0 Northwest)
- Head coach: William Henry Dietz (1st season)
- Offensive scheme: Single-wing
- Captain: Asa Clark
- Home stadium: Rogers Field

1915 Northwest Conference football standings
	Conf.					Overall
Team	W		L		T	W		L		T
Washington State ^ +	4	–	0	–	0	7	–	0	–	0
Washington +	1	–	0	–	0	7	–	0	–	0
Oregon	3	–	1	–	0	7	–	2	–	0
Oregon Agricultural	2	–	2	–	0	5	–	3	–	0
Idaho	0	–	3	–	1	1	–	4	–	1
Whitman	0	–	4	–	1	1	–	5	–	1
+ – Conference co-champions; ^ – Selected as Rose Bowl representative

The 1915 Washington State football team was an American football team that represented Washington State College (now known as Washington State University) as a member of the Northwest Conference (NWC) during the 1915 college football season. In their first year under head coach William Henry Dietz, the team compiled a perfect 7–0 record (4–0 in conference games), tied for the NWC championship, shut out five of seven opponents, and outscored all opponents by a total of 204 to 10. Defensively, the team was near perfect as the only touchdown allowed, by Montana, was scored on a blocked punt recovered in the end zone.

Washington State represented the West Coast in the 1916 Rose Bowl, defeating a Brown team featuring African-American star Fritz Pollard. Washington State dominated the Rose Bowl game, outscoring Brown 14–0, gaining 329 yards from scrimmage to 99 for Brown, and tallying 22 first downs to four. The victory remains Washington State's only Rose Bowl win.

For the first of two consecutive years, Washington State did not play in-state rival Washington, which also finished 7–0 and with claims to the NWC championship.

The team played its home games at Rogers Field in Pullman, Washington.

== Schedule ==
Date	Opponent	Site	Result	Attendance	Source
October 9	Oregon	Rogers Field; Pullman, WA	W 28–3		
October 16	at Oregon Agricultural	Bell Field; Corvallis, OR	W 29–0		
October 30	at Idaho	MacLean Field; Moscow, ID (rivalry)	W 41–0		
November 6	Montana*	Rogers Field; Pullman, WA	W 27–7		
November 16	Whitman	Rogers Field; Pullman, WA	W 17–0		
November 25	at Gonzaga*	Natatorium Park; Spokane, WA	W 48–0		
January 1, 1916	vs. Brown*	Tournament Park; Pasadena, CA (Rose Bowl)	W 14–0	10,000	
*Non-conference game

== Awards and legacy ==
Four Washington State players received first-team honors on the all-conference team selected by George M. Varnell, conference referee, as the official selection for the Northwest Conference. The first-team honorees were: Benton Bangs at halfback; Alfred "Bull" Durham at quarterback; Alfred Langdon at center; and Clarence Zimmerman at end. Harry Applequist and Carl "Red" Dietz were named to the second teamm.

The team was inducted as a group into the Washington State Athletic Hall of Fame in 2011. In 2014, Washington State Senate Resolution 8715 recognized the 1915 Washington State football team as the national champion.

== Coach Dietz ==
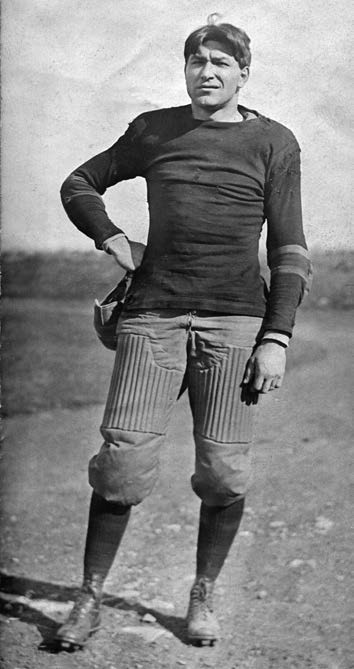
Coach Dietz

Coach Dietz had played college football at the Carlisle Indian School and later coached the 1918 Mare Island Marines football team to a berth in the 1919 Rose Bowl. He was charged in 1919 with having falsely claimed Native American heritage to avoid the draft during World War I, eventually being sentenced to 30 days in jail. He later served as head coach of, among others, the Haskell Fighting Indians and the Boston Redskins. He was inducted into the College Football Hall of Fame in 2012.

== Personnel ==
=== Players ===
The following 17 players received varsity letters for their participation on the 1915 football team:

- Harry Applequist, tackle/guard
- Benton Bangs, halfback
- Ralph "Clyde" Boone, halfback
- Robert "Happy" Brooks, tackle
- Asa V. "Ace" Clark, captain
- Carl "Red" Dietz, end/fullback
- Basil Doane, fullback
- T. Alfred "Bull" Durham, quarterback
- M. Ray "Buck" Finney, guard
- Ronald "Fish" Fishback, guard
- Dick Hanley, halfback
- Walter Herreid, tackle
- Carl King, guard
- Alfred Langdon, center
- Ray Loomis, end
- Silas "Si" Stites, guard
- Clarence Zimmerman, end

=== Coaches and administrators ===
- Head coach: William Henry Dietz
- Athletic director Fred Bohler
- Assistant coaches: Tom Tyrer, Eddie Keinholtz
