= 1915 Oregon Webfoots football team =

American college football season

1915 Oregon Webfoots football
- Conference: Northwest Conference
- Record: 7–2 (3–1 Northwest)
- Head coach: Hugo Bezdek (4th season)
- Captain: Anson Cornell
- Home stadium: Kincaid Field

1915 Northwest Conference football standings
	Conf.					Overall
Team	W		L		T	W		L		T
Washington State ^ +	4	–	0	–	0	7	–	0	–	0
Washington +	1	–	0	–	0	7	–	0	–	0
Oregon	3	–	1	–	0	7	–	2	–	0
Oregon Agricultural	2	–	2	–	0	5	–	3	–	0
Idaho	0	–	3	–	1	1	–	4	–	1
Whitman	0	–	4	–	1	1	–	5	–	1
+ – Conference co-champions; ^ – Selected as Rose Bowl representative

The 1915 Oregon Webfoots football team represented the University of Oregon as a member of the Northwest Conference during the 1915 college football season. Led by fourth-year head coach Hugo Bezdek, the Webfoots compiled an overall record of 7–2 with a mark of 3–1 in conference play, placing third in the Northwest Conference.

The game against USC in Los Angeles was delayed two days due to rain and played on Monday. Oregon did not play border rival Washington this season.

== Schedule ==
Date	Opponent	Site	Result	Attendance	Source
September 25	Multnomah Athletic Club*	Kincaid Field; Eugene, OR	L 7–16	800	
October 2	Pacific (OR)*	Kincaid Field; Eugene, OR	W 47–0		
October 9	at Washington State	Rogers Field; Pullman, WA	L 3–28		
October 16	Idaho	Kincaid Field; Eugene, OR	W 19–7		
October 23	at Whitman	Walla Walla, WA	W 21–0		
October 30	at Willamette*	Salem, OR	W 49–0		
November 8	at USC*	Bovard Field; Los Angeles, CA	W 34–0	2,300	
November 20	Oregon Agricultural	Kincaid Field; Eugene, OR (rivalry)	W 9–0		
November 25	at Multnomah Athletic Club*	Multnomah Field; Portland, OR	W 15–2		
*Non-conference game; Source:
