= 1915 Hawaii Deans football team =

American college football season

1915 Hawaii Deans football
- Conference: Independent
- Record: 5–1–1
- Head coach: John Peden (1st season)
- Captain: Stafford Austin

1915 Western college football independents records
| | Conf. | | | Overall |
| Team | W | L | T | W | | L | | T |
|---|---|---|---|---|---|---|---|---|
| Hawaii | | – | | 5 | – | 1 | – | 1 |
| New Mexico | | – | | 3 | – | 1 | – | 0 |
| New Mexico A&M | | – | | 5 | – | 2 | – | 0 |
| Montana A&M | | – | | 4 | – | 2 | – | 1 |
| Arizona | | – | | 5 | – | 3 | – | 0 |
| California | | – | | 8 | – | 5 | – | 0 |
| Tempe Normal | | – | | 3 | – | 2 | – | 0 |
| University Farm | | – | | 3 | – | 2 | – | 0 |
| Cheney Normal | | – | | 1 | – | 1 | – | 0 |
| Montana | | – | | 2 | – | 2 | – | 2 |
| Willamette | | – | | 2 | – | 2 | – | 1 |
| USC | | – | | 3 | – | 4 | – | 0 |
| Saint Mary's | | – | | 3 | – | 7 | – | 0 |
| Nevada | | – | | 0 | – | 6 | – | 0 |

The 1915 Hawaii Deans football team represented the College of Hawaiʻi—now known as the University of Hawaiʻi at Mānoa–as an independent during the 1915 college football season. In their first and only season under head coach John Peden, the Deans compiled a 5–1–1 record. Stafford Austin was the team captain.

== Schedule ==
| Date | Time | Opponent | Site | Result | Source |
|---|---|---|---|---|---|
| October 9 | | at Kamehameha High School | Kam Field; Honolulu, Territory of Hawaii | L 0–7 | |
| October 16 | 3:00 p.m. | McKinley High School | Moiliili Field; Honolulu, Territory of Hawaii | W 17–0 | |
| October 30 | | Punahou School | Honolulu, Territory of Hawaii | W 15–13 | |
| November 5 | | vs. Mid-Pacific Institute | Punahou Field; Honolulu, Territory of Hawaii | W 50–0 | |
| November 13 | | at Punahou School | Alexander Field; Honolulu, Territory of Hawaii | T 0–0 | |
| November 17 | 3:30 p.m. | at Kamehameha High School | Kamehameha Field; Honolulu, Territory of Hawaii | W 20–16 | |
| November 20 | | McKinley High School | Honolulu, Territory of Hawaii | W 19–0 | |
