= William Henry Dietz =

American football player and coach (1884–1964)

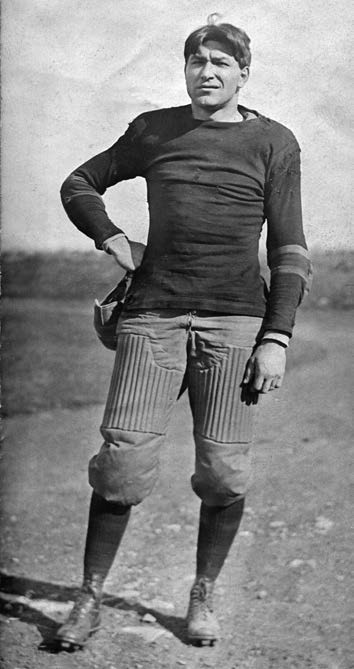
- Dietz, as a member of the Carlisle football team between 1909 and 1912

Biographical details
- Born: August 17, 1884; Rice Lake, Wisconsin, U.S.
- Died: July 20, 1964 (aged 79); Reading, Pennsylvania, U.S.

Playing career

Football
- 1909–1912: Carlisle
- Position: Tackle

Coaching career (HC unless noted)

Football
- 1915–1917: Washington State
- 1918: Mare Island Marines
- 1921: Purdue
- 1922–1923: Louisiana Tech
- 1924–1926: Wyoming
- 1929–1932: Haskell
- 1933–1934: Boston Redskins
- 1936: Ole Miss (assistant)
- 1937–1942: Albright

Baseball
- 1923: Louisiana Tech

Head coaching record
- Overall: 105–60–7 (college football); 16–6 (college baseball); 11–11–2 (NFL)
- Bowls: 1–1

Accomplishments and honors

Championships
- Football; 2 Northwest Conference (1915, 1917); 1 PCC (1917)
- College Football Hall of Fame; Inducted in 2012 (profile)

William Henry "Lone Star" Dietz (August 17, 1884 – July 20, 1964) was an American football player and coach. He served as the head college football coach at Washington State University, Purdue University, Louisiana Tech University, University of Wyoming, Haskell Institute—now known as Haskell Indian Nations University, and Albright College. Dietz was also head coach for the Boston Redskins of the National Football League (NFL). He was inducted into the College Football Hall of Fame in 2012.

== Early life ==
Dietz was born on August 17, 1884, in Rice Lake, Wisconsin. His father William Wallace Dietz, settled in the area in 1871 and was elected county sheriff in 1877. His father married Leanna Ginder in November 1879.

Dietz was an employee of and briefly claimed to attend Oklahoma's Chilocco Indian Agricultural School. He left the school after appearing in one football game for them and did not graduate. He attended Macalester College in Minnesota in 1902 and 1903. Dietz enrolled at the Carlisle Indian School in Pennsylvania beginning in 1907 and was a star player for their football team.

=== Contested heritage ===
Dietz's heritage was first contested in 1916 after former neighbors who settled on the Pacific Coast heard he was posing as a Native American. In December 1918 the Federal Bureau of Investigation looked into his heritage after he registered for the draft as a "Non-Citizen Indian" with an allotment. The Bureau found he had taken on the identity of James One Star, an Oglala man of the Pine Ridge Indian Reservation 12 years his senior who had disappeared in Cuba in 1894. Dietz also claimed he was the head of an American film company that produced propaganda films for the war.

Dietz was tried in Spokane, Washington in June 1919 for violating the Selective Service law. One Star's sister, Sallie Eaglehorse, testified after seeing him for the first time at the trial that Dietz was surely not her brother. Still, the judge instructed the jury to determine whether Dietz "believed" he was a Native American, not whether it was true. Despite that others had witnessed his birth in the summer of 1884 or had seen him the following day, Dietz's mother Leanna claimed he was the Native American son of her husband who had been switched a week or more after she had a stillbirth. Dietz's acting ability along with his mother's fallacious testimony (to protect him from prison) resulted in a hung jury, but Dietz was immediately re-indicted. The second trial resulted in a sentence of 30 days in the Spokane County Jail after he pleaded "no contest".

Dietz's true heritage remains controversial. Although he is recognized as an "Indian athlete" by Dan Snyder, former owner of the Washington Commanders (formerly known as the Washington Redskins), Indian Country Today Media Network ran a series of articles in 2004 exposing Dietz as a white man masquerading as a Native American. In 1988, the National Congress of American Indians attempted to meet and discuss the issue with the team's former owner, Jack Kent Cooke, but Cooke refused a meeting. Researcher Linda Waggoner traced Dietz's heritage in several articles in Indian Country Today Media Network and at a 2013 symposium at the National Museum of the American Indian.

== Playing career ==
Dietz played at the Carlisle Indian Industrial School of Carlisle, Pennsylvania, with teammate Jim Thorpe, under famed coach Pop Warner. Author Tom Benjey speculated that Dietz may have been the "Frank Lone Star" who played for the Columbus Panhandles of the American Professional Football Association (now NFL) in 1920.

== Coaching career ==
In 1921, Dietz took a coaching position with Purdue University in Indiana. After Angel De Cora died in 1919, he married Doris O. Pottlitzer, a middle-aged local journalist, on January 29, 1922. The week previous to their marriage, Purdue officials fired him for illegal recruiting. In spring 1933, George Preston Marshall, owner of the Boston Braves, hired Dietz to replace Coach Lud Wray. In 1937, the team moved to Washington, D.C.

For the rest of his life, Dietz continued to promote himself as Lone Star Dietz, the son of W. W. and Julia One Star of Pine Ridge. He took on his last coaching job in 1937 for Albright College in Pennsylvania; in 1964, still married to Doris, Dietz died in Reading, Pennsylvania. Later in life, Dietz was an active painter exhibiting his work at Lafayette College with in an exhibit curated by Francis Quirk. He and Doris were so poor that former teammates purchased his headstone. It reads: "William ‘Lone Star’ Dietz born in South Dakota."

George Preston Marshall, owner and founder of the Boston Braves, sought to rename the franchise in 1933 after leaving the stadium the team had shared with the baseball team of the same name. Marshall was said to have named the Redskins in honor of Dietz, who claimed to be of the Sioux Nation, by analogy with the Red Sox who shared the team's new home, Fenway Park. A 1933 news article quotes Marshall as saying he named the team because of real Indians on the team. However, Marshall is only talking about why he specifically chose Redskins. Dietz was hired before the name change and is cited in many articles and by Marshall as being a reason he kept the Native American theme when changing the team name.

== Recognition ==
Dietz was inducted into the College Football Hall of Fame in 2012.

== Nickname ==
Dietz named himself "Lone Star" after James One Star, the alleged nephew of an Oglala Buffalo Bill Performer sometime after the 1904 St. Louis World's Fair. "Lone Star" and "One Star" are the same name in Oglala.

== Personal life ==
Dietz divorced De Cora in November 1918, charging her with abandonment. It is not clear how much she knew about his identity. She died six days after his indictment. Later in life, Dietz was an active painter, exhibiting his work at Lehigh University with sculptors Joseph Brown and José de Rivera in a 1955 exhibit curated by Francis Quirk.

== Head coaching record ==
=== College football ===
Year	Team	Overall	Conference	Standing	Bowl/playoffs
Washington State (Northwest Conference) (1915–1916)
1915	Washington State	7–0	4–0	T–1st	W Rose
1916	Washington State	4–2	2–2	4th	
Washington State (Northwest Conference / Pacific Coast Conference) (1917)
1917	Washington State	6–0–1	5–0 / 3–0	1st / 1st	
Washington State:		17–2–1	11–2		
Mare Island Marines (Independent) (1918)
1918	Mare Island Marines	10–1			L Rose
Mare Island Marines:		10–1			
Purdue Boilermakers (Big Ten Conference) (1921)
1921	Purdue	1–6	1–4	T–8th	
Purdue:		1–6	1–4		
Louisiana Tech Bulldogs (Louisiana Intercollegiate Athletic Association) (1922–1923)
1922	Louisiana Tech	5–1–1	1–1–1	3rd	
1923	Louisiana Tech	6–2	2–1	T–2nd	
Louisiana Tech:		11–3–1	3–2–1		
Wyoming Cowboys (Rocky Mountain Conference) (1924–1926)
1924	Wyoming	2–6	1–6	10th	
1925	Wyoming	6–3	4–3	5th	
1926	Wyoming	2–4–2	1–2–2	8th	
Wyoming:		10–13–2	6–11–2		
Haskell Indians (Independent) (1929–1932)
1929	Haskell	8–2			
1930	Haskell	9–1			
1931	Haskell	6–4			
1932	Haskell	2–5–1			
Haskell:		25–12–1			
Albright Lions (Independent) (1937–1942)
1937	Albright	7–0–1			
1938	Albright	4–5–1			
1939	Albright	5–4			
1940	Albright	5–5			
1941	Albright	6–4			
1942	Albright	4–5			
Albright:		31–23–2			
Total:		105–60–7			
National championship Conference title Conference division title or championship game berth

=== NFL ===
Team	Year	Regular season					Postseason			
Team	Year	Won	Lost	Ties	Win %	Finish	Won	Lost	Win %	Result
BOS	1933	5	5	2	.500	3rd in NFL Eastern	–	–	–	–
BOS	1934	6	6	0	.500	2nd in NFL Eastern	–	–	–	–
Total		11	11	2	.500		–	–	–	

=== College baseball ===
Record table
Season	Team	Overall	Conference	Standing	Postseason
Louisiana Tech Bulldogs () (1923)
1923	Louisiana Tech	16–6			
Louisiana Tech:		16–6			
Total:		16–6			
