= John Peden =

John Peden may refer to:

- John Peden (American football)
- John Peden (politician)
- Jack Peden, Irish footballer
