= 1915 California Golden Bears football team =

American college football season

1915 California Golden Bears football
- Conference: Independent
- Record: 8–5
- Head coach: Jimmie Schaeffer (1st season)
- Captain: Clifford G. Canfield
- Home stadium: California Field

1915 Western college football independents records
| | Conf. | | | Overall |
| Team | W | L | T | W | | L | | T |
|---|---|---|---|---|---|---|---|---|
| Hawaii | | – | | 5 | – | 1 | – | 1 |
| New Mexico | | – | | 3 | – | 1 | – | 0 |
| New Mexico A&M | | – | | 5 | – | 2 | – | 0 |
| Montana A&M | | – | | 4 | – | 2 | – | 1 |
| Arizona | | – | | 5 | – | 3 | – | 0 |
| California | | – | | 8 | – | 5 | – | 0 |
| Tempe Normal | | – | | 3 | – | 2 | – | 0 |
| University Farm | | – | | 3 | – | 2 | – | 0 |
| Cheney Normal | | – | | 1 | – | 1 | – | 0 |
| Montana | | – | | 2 | – | 2 | – | 2 |
| Willamette | | – | | 2 | – | 2 | – | 1 |
| USC | | – | | 3 | – | 4 | – | 0 |
| Saint Mary's | | – | | 3 | – | 7 | – | 0 |
| Nevada | | – | | 0 | – | 6 | – | 0 |

The 1915 California Golden Bears football team was an American football team that represented the University of California, Berkeley during the 1915 college football season. The team competed as an independent under head coach Jimmie Schaeffer and compiled a record of 8–5. This was Cal's first season of football since 1905 and final season as an independent.

== Schedule ==
| Date | Opponent | Site | Result | Attendance | Source |
|---|---|---|---|---|---|
| September 11 | Olympic Club | California Field; Berkeley, CA | W 17–0 | | |
| September 18 | Commercial Club | California Field; Berkeley, CA | L 0–10 | | |
| September 25 | Olympic Club | California Field; Berkeley, CA | W 18–2 | | |
| October 2 | Olympic Club | California Field; Berkeley, CA | W 19–9 | | |
| October 9 | Originals | California Field; Berkeley, CA | W 7–0 | | |
| October 16 | Sherman Indians | California Field; Berkeley, CA | W 44–7 | | |
| October 20 | Saint Mary's | California Field; Berkeley, CA | L 6–7 | | |
| October 23 | USC | California Field; Berkeley, CA | L 10–28 | 10,000 | |
| October 30 | Saint Mary's | California Field; Berkeley, CA | W 10–9 | | |
| November 6 | Washington | California Field; Berkeley, CA | L 0–72 | 2,500 | |
| November 13 | at Washington | Denny Field; Seattle, WA | L 7–13 | 3,500 | |
| November 20 | at Nevada | Reno, NV | W 81–6 | | |
| November 25 | at USC | Washington Park; Los Angeles, CA | W 23–21 | 8,000 | |
