= 1915 Montana A&M football team =

American college football season

1915 Montana A&M football
- Conference: Independent
- Record: 4–2–1
- Head coach: Fred Bennion (2nd season)
- Captain: Radford "Punk" Taylor

1915 Western college football independents records
	Conf.			Overall
Team	W	L	T	W		L		T
Hawaii		–		5	–	1	–	1
New Mexico		–		3	–	1	–	0
New Mexico A&M		–		5	–	2	–	0
Montana A&M		–		4	–	2	–	1
Arizona		–		5	–	3	–	0
California		–		8	–	5	–	0
Tempe Normal		–		3	–	2	–	0
University Farm		–		3	–	2	–	0
Cheney Normal		–		1	–	1	–	0
Montana		–		2	–	2	–	2
Willamette		–		2	–	2	–	1
USC		–		3	–	4	–	0
Saint Mary's		–		3	–	7	–	0
Nevada		–		0	–	6	–	0

The 1915 Montana A&M football team was an American football team that represented the Montana College of Agriculture and Mechanic Arts (later renamed Montana State University) during the 1915 college football season. In its second season under head coach Fred Bennion, the team compiled a 4–2–1 record and was outscored by a total of 86 to 75.

Radford "Punk" Taylor, who had previously played for Gallatin High, was the team captain.

Cy Gatton was the quarterback and was selected at the end of the season to serve as captain of the 1916 team. In announcing the selection of Gatton, The Anaconda Standard noted: "Gatton has played a brilliant, scrappy and consistent game throughout the entire schedule and has been the pillar of the Aggie defense.

== Schedule ==
Date	Opponent	Site	Result	Source
October 2	Montana Mines	Brewer Field; Bozeman, MT	W 16–0	
October 9	at Colorado College	Washburn Field; Colorado Springs, CO	L 0–47	
October 13	at Denver	Denver, CO	L 3–27	
October 16	Butte Athletic Club	Brewer Field; Bozeman, MT	W 29–6	
October 23	at Montana Mines	Columbia Gardens; Butte, MT	T 6–6	
November 5	All-Stars	Brewer Field; Bozeman, MT	W 14–0	
November 13	Utah Agricultural	Brewer Field; Bozeman, MT	W 7–0	
