= 1915 USC Trojans football team =

American college football season

1915 USC Trojans football
- Conference: Independent
- Record: 3–4
- Head coach: Ralph Glaze (2nd season)
- Captain: Len Livernash
- Home stadium: Bovard Field

1915 Western college football independents records
	Conf.			Overall
Team	W	L	T	W		L		T
Hawaii		–		5	–	1	–	1
New Mexico		–		3	–	1	–	0
New Mexico A&M		–		5	–	2	–	0
Montana A&M		–		4	–	2	–	1
Arizona		–		5	–	3	–	0
California		–		8	–	5	–	0
Tempe Normal		–		3	–	2	–	0
University Farm		–		3	–	2	–	0
Cheney Normal		–		1	–	1	–	0
Montana		–		2	–	2	–	2
Willamette		–		2	–	2	–	1
USC		–		3	–	4	–	0
Saint Mary's		–		3	–	7	–	0
Nevada		–		0	–	6	–	0

The 1915 USC Trojans football team represented the University of Southern California (USC) in the 1915 college football season. In their second and final year under head coach Ralph Glaze, the Trojans compiled a 3–4 record and outscored their opponents by a combined total of 132 to 119. The season featured USC's first ever games against both California (a 28–10 win at Berkeley and a 23–21 loss in Los Angeles) and Oregon (a 34–0 loss).

== Schedule ==
Date	Opponent	Site	Result	Attendance	Source
October 2	Los Angeles Athletic Club	Bovard Field; Los Angeles, CA	W 21–9		
October 16	Saint Mary's	Bovard Field; Los Angeles, CA	W 47–3		
October 23	at California	Berkeley, CA	W 28–10	10,000	
November 8	Oregon	Bovard Field; Los Angeles, CA	L 0–34	2,300	
November 20	at Utah	Cummings Field; Salt Lake City, UT	L 13–20		
November 25	vs. California	Washington Park; Los Angeles, CA	L 21–23	8,000	
December 11	vs. Whittier	Washington Park; Los Angeles, CA	L 2–20		
