= 1915 Oregon Agricultural Aggies football team =

American college football season

1915 Oregon Agricultural Aggies football
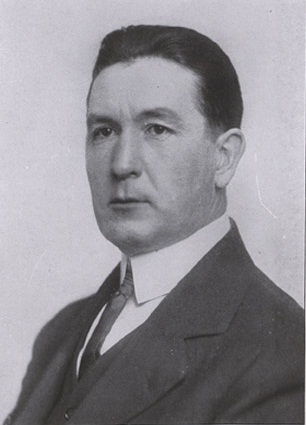
- Conference: Northwest Conference
- Record: 5–3 (2–2 Northwest)
- Head coach: E. J. Stewart (3rd season)
- Captain: Brewer Billie
- Home stadium: Bell Field

1915 Northwest Conference football standings
	Conf.					Overall
Team	W		L		T	W		L		T
Washington State ^ +	4	–	0	–	0	7	–	0	–	0
Washington +	1	–	0	–	0	7	–	0	–	0
Oregon	3	–	1	–	0	7	–	2	–	0
Oregon Agricultural	2	–	2	–	0	5	–	3	–	0
Idaho	0	–	3	–	1	1	–	4	–	1
Whitman	0	–	4	–	1	1	–	5	–	1
+ – Conference co-champions; ^ – Selected as Rose Bowl representative

The 1915 Oregon Agricultural Aggies football team represented Oregon Agricultural College (OAC)—now known as Oregon State University—as a member of the Northwest Conference during the 1915 college football season. In their third and final season under head coach E. J. Stewart, the Aggies compiled an overall record of 5–3 with a mark of 2–2 in conference play, placing fourth Northwest Conference. OAC outscored their opponents 74-45 in conference play.

Oregon Agricultural's upset victory over Michigan Agricultural on October 30 was notable because the previous week Michigan Agricultural shut out the unbeaten Michigan Wolverines in Ann Arbor, Michigan. The college played home games at Bell Field in Corvallis, Oregon. Brewer Billie was the team captain.

== Schedule ==
Date	Opponent	Site	Result	Attendance	Source
September 25	O.A.C. alumni*	Bell Field; Corvallis, OR	W 3–0	"record breaking"	
October 2	Willamette*	Bell Field; Corvallis, OR	W 69–0		
October 9	Whitman	Bell Field; Corvallis, OR	W 34–7		
October 16	Washington State	Bell Field; Corvallis, OR	L 0–29		
October 30	at Michigan Agricultural*	College Field; East Lansing, MI	W 20–0		
November 6	Idaho	Bell Field; Corvallis, OR	W 40–0		
November 20	at Oregon	Kincaid Field; Eugene, OR (rivalry)	L 0–9		
December 1	vs. Syracuse*	Multnomah Field; Portland, OR	L 0–26	8,000–10,000	
*Non-conference game

== Game summaries ==
=== September 25: vs. OAC Alumni ===
The season started as usual, with a practice game against recently graduated OAC football stars, reunited as the OAC alumni team. The alumni had the first opportunity to score, attempting a 39-yard field goal in the first quarter. The kick attempt by alumni fullback Amy Hauser was blocked however, and the teams traded fumbles and punts for the remainder of the scoreless first half.

Early in the third quarter, after the varsity lost the ball through a fumble on their own 35-yard line, the alumni had a forward pass picked off by "Abe" Abraham of the varsity and saw the ball returned past midfield. Fullback Abraham tacked on another 10 yard run, working the ball into scoring position. Guard Harry Cole, kicker for the varsity, set up for a 42-yard field goal and nailed the kick, providing the "ragged and uninteresting" game's only score.

=== October 2: vs. Willamette University ===
Ten to zero was the score, reckoning the one-sided obliteration of Willamette University by number of touchdowns scored rather than points. OAC's 69–0 score against the visitors from Salem marked it the biggest in school history, tying a 75–6 drubbing of Chemawa Indian School in 1911 for the largest margin of victory.

Willamette gained just two first downs for the entire game, going three-and-out for the rest of the contest, and "at no stage of the game were within striking distance of the Aggie goal line."

Touchdowns, listed alphabetically, were recorded by Abraham (1), Alworth (3), Hoerline (1), Locey (2), Newman (2), and Schuster (1) — the last-mentioned coming via the air on a 25-yard touchdown pass from Ollis "Dark Horse" Newman. "Gains of 10 to 15 yards were so frequent that they failed to arouse any excitement among the rooters," the reporter for the campus newspaper complained.

=== October 9: vs. Whitman College ===
The weather was perfect and the field in excellent condition for the Aggies' match with Whitman College of Walla Walla in the 1915 conference opener. The contest was not a contest, with the Portland Oregonian judging Whitman to have been "completely outplayed in every department" in a lopsided 34–7 loss. After playing the Aggies even in a 7–7 first quarter, the tide turned mightily against the plucky Blues, with OAC racking up three more touchdowns before the half and running away with the game.

In their own view, Whitman's team was too small to stop OAC's heavier backs from running through the middle and too inexperienced to counter the "trick forward pass formations consisting in the main of complicated triple passes," to their detriment on the scoreboard. "At no time after the first quarter did Whitman appear dangerous," the Oregonian's reporter remarked.

Twice the same "triple pass" play found paydirt, with the ball moving from right half Brewer Billie to left half Herman Abraham to the speedy right end Charles Moist for the score. Abraham also racked up two touchdowns and quarterback Percy Locey one as part of the convincing OAC win.

=== October 16: vs. Washington Agricultural ===
After racking up two one-sided victories against lesser opponents by a combined score of 103 to 7, OAC plummeted back to earth as victims of a 29–0 shutout pummeling at the hands of their Washington State Agricultural counterparts. In a game filled with penalties and turnovers, the Beavers proved unable to move the ball either on the ground or by air against a stout Palouse defense. The Washington Aggie backs — Durham, Bangs, Dietz, and Doane — carved up the Orangemen on the ground, with Durham booting three dropkick field goals through the posts on those occasions when OAC's defense did manage to rally.

OAC found themselves "completely outclassed in every department of the game," and wound up staring at a zero on the scoreboard when the final whistle sounded just as the home team was lining up to attempt a field goal from the 15-yard line. "No alibis can be presented for the defeat, the reason being simply the Orange and Black team was outclassed," the sportswriter from the OAC Barometer lamented. Adding injury to insult, the Orangemen lost left halfback Herman "Abe" Abraham to a head injury in the fourth quarter of the loss.

=== October 30: at Michigan Agricultural ===
The Beavers were up against it as October wound to a close — a long road trip to East Lansing, Michigan, to take on the undefeated Michigan Agricultural College team — a squad coming off a heady victory against the Michigan Wolverines. The loss against OAC's first quality opponent of the year two weeks previous had been demoralizing and few gave the Orangemen much of a chance in the contest.

== Roster ==
Team roster published ahead of the rivalry game against the University of Oregon including rare detail on height, age, jersey number, home town, and years of experience.
