= 1915 Idaho football team =

American college football season

1915 Idaho football
- Conference: Northwest Conference
- Record: 1–4–1 (0–3–1 Northwest)
- Head coach: Charles M. Rademacher (1st season)
- Home stadium: MacLean Field

1915 Northwest Conference football standings
	Conf.					Overall
Team	W		L		T	W		L		T
Washington State ^ +	4	–	0	–	0	7	–	0	–	0
Washington +	1	–	0	–	0	7	–	0	–	0
Oregon	3	–	1	–	0	7	–	2	–	0
Oregon Agricultural	2	–	2	–	0	5	–	3	–	0
Idaho	0	–	3	–	1	1	–	4	–	1
Whitman	0	–	4	–	1	1	–	5	–	1
+ – Conference co-champions; ^ – Selected as Rose Bowl representative

The 1915 Idaho football team represented the University of Idaho as a member of the Northwest Conference during the 1915 college football season. Led by Charles M. Rademacher in his first and only season as head coach, Idaho compiled an overall record of 1–4–1 with a mark of 0–3–1 in conference play, placing fifth in the Northwest Conference. The team played two home games at MacLean Field, on campus in Moscow, Idaho.

In the season opener, Idaho fell to Montana for the first time, in the series' third meeting, losing 15–3 at Dornblaser Field in Missoula, Montana. Idaho dropped a second consecutive shutout to Washington State in the Battle of the Palouse, falling 0–41 at home. Eight years later, the Vandals won the first of three consecutive, their only three-peat in the rivalry series.

Idaho opened the season with four losses, then won and tied a game for a 1–4–1 record. They scored just nine points all season, and the only touchdown was an interception return, which defeated Gonzaga. Their only points on offense came on a drop-kick field goal in the first quarter of the opener at Montana.

A fatality occurred at practice on October 6; a part-time player, Chauncey Lyman of Idaho Falls, was knocked unconscious after his head impacted a ball carrier's thigh. Lyman died about an hour later, and the cause of death was a [[Basilar skull fracture|basilar skull fracture]].

== Schedule ==
Date	Opponent	Site	Result	Source
October 2	at Montana*	Dornblaser Field; Missoula, MT (rivalry)	L 3–15	
October 16	at Oregon	Kincaid Field; Eugene, OR	L 0–26	
October 30	Washington State	MacLean Field; Moscow, ID (Battle of the Palouse)	L 0–41	
November 6	at Oregon Agricultural	Bell Field; Corvallis, OR	L 0–40	
November 13	at Gonzaga*	Natatorium Park; Spokane, WA (rivalry)	W 6–3	
November 25	Whitman	MacLean Field; Moscow, ID	T 0–0	
*Non-conference game
