= 1915 Nevada Sagebrushers football team =

American college football season

1915 Nevada Sagebrushers football
- Conference: Independent
- Record: 0–6
- Head coach: Jack Glascock (1st season)
- Home stadium: Mackay Field

1915 Western college football independents records
	Conf.			Overall
Team	W	L	T	W		L		T
Hawaii		–		5	–	1	–	1
New Mexico		–		3	–	1	–	0
New Mexico A&M		–		5	–	2	–	0
Montana A&M		–		4	–	2	–	1
Arizona		–		5	–	3	–	0
California		–		8	–	5	–	0
Tempe Normal		–		3	–	2	–	0
University Farm		–		3	–	2	–	0
Cheney Normal		–		1	–	1	–	0
Montana		–		2	–	2	–	2
Willamette		–		2	–	2	–	1
USC		–		3	–	4	–	0
Saint Mary's		–		3	–	7	–	0
Nevada		–		0	–	6	–	0

The 1915 Nevada Sagebrushers football team was an American football team that represented the University of Nevada as an independent during the 1915 college football season. The Sagebrushers were led by first-year head coach Jack Glascock and played their home games at Mackay Field.

== Schedule ==
Date	Opponent	Site	Result
October 2	Sacramento AC (CA)	Mackay Field; Reno, NV	L 0–24
October 7	Olympic Club	Mackay Field; Reno, NV	L 6–7
October 16	at Utah Agricultural	Adams Field; Logan, UT	L 0–26
October 23	vs. University Farm	Carson City, NV	L 10–14
November 20	California	Mackay Field; Reno, NV	L 6–81
November 25	at Sacramento AC (CA)	Sacramento, CA	L 0–6
