= 1915 Montana Grizzlies football team =

American college football season

1915 Montana Grizzlies football
- Conference: Independent
- Record: 2–2–2
- Head coach: Jerry Nissen (1st season)
- Home stadium: Dornblaser Field

1915 Western college football independents records
	Conf.			Overall
Team	W	L	T	W		L		T
Hawaii		–		5	–	1	–	1
New Mexico		–		3	–	1	–	0
New Mexico A&M		–		5	–	2	–	0
Montana A&M		–		4	–	2	–	1
Arizona		–		5	–	3	–	0
California		–		8	–	5	–	0
Tempe Normal		–		3	–	2	–	0
University Farm		–		3	–	2	–	0
Cheney Normal		–		1	–	1	–	0
Montana		–		2	–	2	–	2
Willamette		–		2	–	2	–	1
USC		–		3	–	4	–	0
Saint Mary's		–		3	–	7	–	0
Nevada		–		0	–	6	–	0

The 1915 Montana Grizzlies football team represented the University of Montana in the 1915 college football season. They were led by first-year head coach Jerry Nissen, played their home games at Dornblaser Field, and finished the season with a record of 2–2–2.

== Schedule ==
Date	Opponent	Site	Result	Source
October 2	Idaho	Dornblaser Field; Missoula, MT (rivalry)	W 15–3	
October 8	at South Dakota	Athletic Field; Aberdeen, SD	L 7–10	
October 11	at North Dakota	Grand Forks, ND	T 10–10	
November 6	at Washington State	Rogers Field; Pullman, WA	L 7–27	
November 13	Centerville Athletic Club	Dornblaser Field; Missoula, MT	W 50–0	
November 25	Syracuse	Dornblaser Field; Missoula, MT	T 6–6	
