= 1915 Washington football team =

American college football season

1915 Washington football
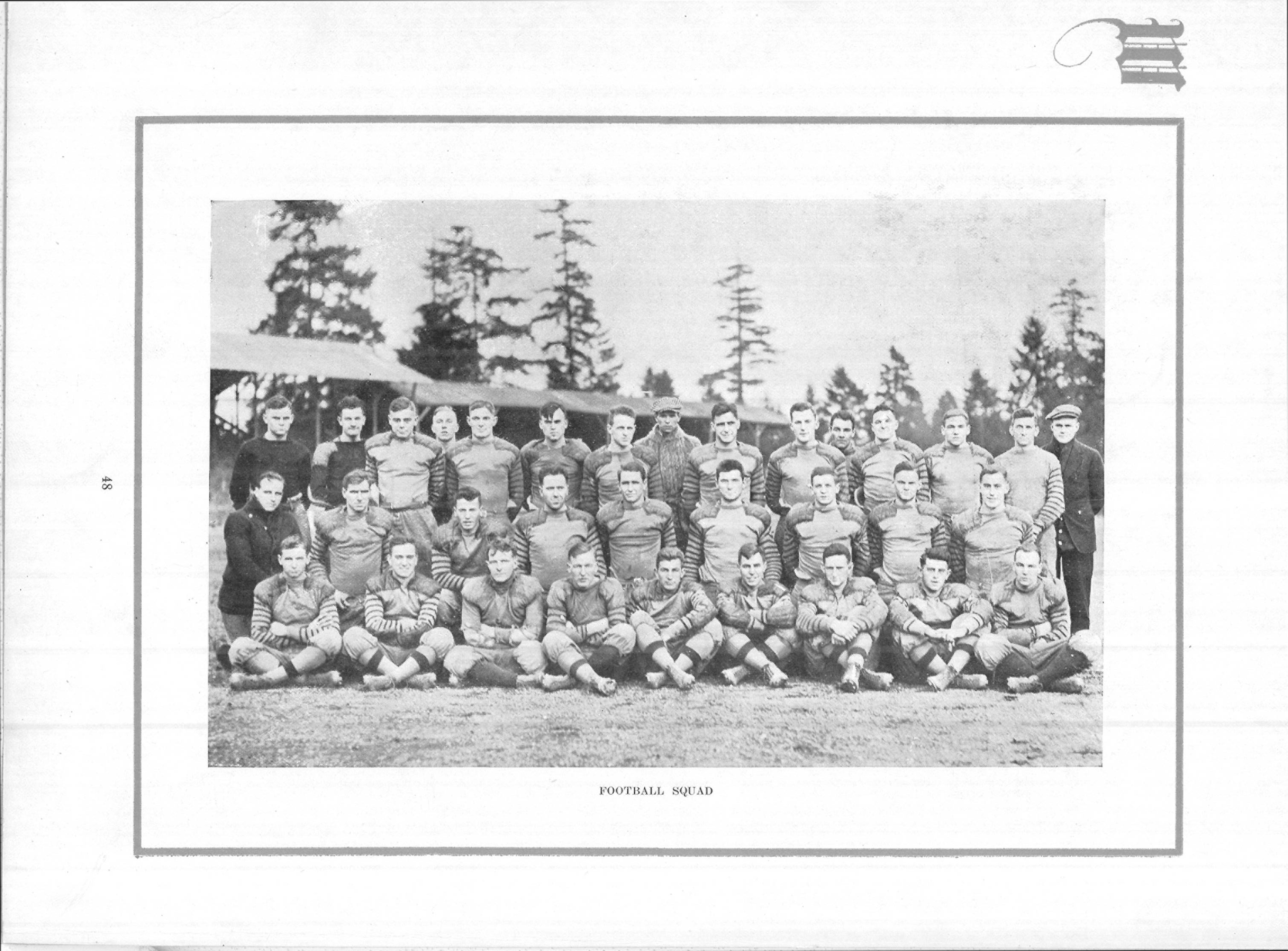

Northwest Conference co-champion
- Conference: Northwest Conference
- Record: 7–0 (1–0 Northwest)
- Head coach: Gil Dobie (8th season)
- Captain: Ray Hunt
- Home stadium: Denny Field

1915 Northwest Conference football standings
	Conf.					Overall
Team	W		L		T	W		L		T
Washington State ^ +	4	–	0	–	0	7	–	0	–	0
Washington +	1	–	0	–	0	7	–	0	–	0
Oregon	3	–	1	–	0	7	–	2	–	0
Oregon Agricultural	2	–	2	–	0	5	–	3	–	0
Idaho	0	–	3	–	1	1	–	4	–	1
Whitman	0	–	4	–	1	1	–	5	–	1
+ – Conference co-champions; ^ – Selected as Rose Bowl representative

The 1915 Washington football team represented the University of Washington as a member of the Northwest Conference during the 1915 college football season. In its eighth season under coach Gil Dobie, the team compiled an overall record of 7–0 record, shut out five of seven opponents, and outscored opponents by a combined total of 274 to 14. Washington had a mark of 1–0 in conference play, and were co-champions of the Northwest Conference alongside Washington State. Ray Hunt was the team captain.

Washington did not play Washington State, Oregon, or Oregon Agricultural this season. Play in the Pacific Coast Conference began the following year.

Bow Down to Washington was written in 1915 and first performed at the game vs. California on November 6. The song's lyrics were printed in the game program for the second game against California one week later in Seattle.

== Schedule ==
Date	Time	Opponent	Site	Result	Attendance	Source
October 2	3:00 p.m.	Ballard Meteors*	Denny Field; Seattle, WA	W 31–0	2,000	
October 9		Washington Park Athletic Club*	Denny Field; Seattle, WA	W 64–0	2,000	
October 23	3:00 p.m.	at Gonzaga*	Natatorium Park; Spokane, WA	W 21–7	1,000	
October 30		Whitman	Denny Field; Seattle, WA	W 27–0	3,000	
November 6		at California*	California Field; Berkeley, CA	W 72–0	2,500	
November 13	2:30 p.m.	California*	Denny Field; Seattle, WA	W 13–7	3,500	
November 25		Colorado*	Denny Field; Seattle, WA	W 46–0	6,000	
*Non-conference game; Source:
