= 1915 New Mexico A&M Aggies football team =

American college football season

1915 New Mexico A&M Aggies football
- Conference: Independent
- Record: 3–1
- Head coach: Clarence W. Russell (2nd season)

1915 Western college football independents records
	Conf.			Overall
Team	W	L	T	W		L		T
Hawaii		–		5	–	1	–	1
New Mexico		–		3	–	1	–	0
New Mexico A&M		–		5	–	2	–	0
Montana A&M		–		4	–	2	–	1
Arizona		–		5	–	3	–	0
California		–		8	–	5	–	0
Tempe Normal		–		3	–	2	–	0
University Farm		–		3	–	2	–	0
Cheney Normal		–		1	–	1	–	0
Montana		–		2	–	2	–	2
Willamette		–		2	–	2	–	1
USC		–		3	–	4	–	0
Saint Mary's		–		3	–	7	–	0
Nevada		–		0	–	6	–	0

The 1915 New Mexico A&M Aggies football team was an American football team that represented New Mexico College of Agriculture and Mechanical Arts (now known as New Mexico State University) during the 1915 college football season. In their second year under head coach Clarence W. Russell, the Aggies compiled a 3–1 record.

== Schedule ==
Date	Time	Opponent	Site	Result	Attendance	Source
October 2		El Paso High School (exhibition)	Las Cruces fair; Las Cruces, NM	L 3–6	6,000	
October 16		Fourth Field Artillery, Fort Bliss (exhibition?)	Las Cruces, NM	W 2–0		
October 23		at El Paso High School (exhibition)	Rio Grande Park; El Paso, TX	W 27–0		
October 30		Texas Mines	Las Cruces, NM (rivalry)	W 33–0		
November 6	2:15 p.m.	Arizona	Las Cruces, NM	W 3–0		
November 12		at New Mexico Military	Roswell, NM	W 17–7		
November 25		New Mexico	Las Cruces, NM (rivalry)	L 0–13		
