= 1915 Tempe Normal Owls football team =

American college football season

1915 Tempe Normal Owls football
- Conference: Independent
- Record: 3–2
- Head coach: George Schaeffer (2nd season)
- Home stadium: Normal Field

1915 Western college football independents records
| | Conf. | | | Overall |
| Team | W | L | T | W | | L | | T |
|---|---|---|---|---|---|---|---|---|
| Hawaii | | – | | 5 | – | 1 | – | 1 |
| New Mexico | | – | | 3 | – | 1 | – | 0 |
| New Mexico A&M | | – | | 5 | – | 2 | – | 0 |
| Montana A&M | | – | | 4 | – | 2 | – | 1 |
| Arizona | | – | | 5 | – | 3 | – | 0 |
| California | | – | | 8 | – | 5 | – | 0 |
| Tempe Normal | | – | | 3 | – | 2 | – | 0 |
| University Farm | | – | | 3 | – | 2 | – | 0 |
| Cheney Normal | | – | | 1 | – | 1 | – | 0 |
| Montana | | – | | 2 | – | 2 | – | 2 |
| Willamette | | – | | 2 | – | 2 | – | 1 |
| USC | | – | | 3 | – | 4 | – | 0 |
| Saint Mary's | | – | | 3 | – | 7 | – | 0 |
| Nevada | | – | | 0 | – | 6 | – | 0 |

The 1915 Tempe Normal Owls football team was an American football team that represented Tempe Normal School (later renamed Arizona State University) as an independent during the 1915 college football season. In their second season under head coach George Schaeffer, the Owls compiled a 3–2 record and were outscored by their opponents by a combined total of 125 to 36. The team's games included a 7–0 loss in the Arizona–Arizona State football rivalry. Kelly Moeur was the team captain.

== Schedule ==
| Date | Opponent | Site | Result |
|---|---|---|---|
| October 9 | at Arizona | Tucson, AZ (rivalry) | L 0–7 |
| | Phoenix High School | Normal Field; Tempe, AZ | W 14–7 |
| | Phoenix Indian School Alumni | Normal Field; Tempe, AZ | W 32–0 |
| | at Northern Arizona | Flagstaff, AZ | W 72–3 |
| | Phoenix Indian School | Normal Field; Tempe, AZ | L 7–19 |
