= 1915 Cheney Normal football team =

American college football season

1915 Cheney Normal football
- Conference: Independent
- Record: 1–1
- Head coach: Albert Fertsch (3rd season)

1915 Western college football independents records
| | Conf. | | | Overall |
| Team | W | L | T | W | | L | | T |
|---|---|---|---|---|---|---|---|---|
| Hawaii | | – | | 5 | – | 1 | – | 1 |
| New Mexico | | – | | 3 | – | 1 | – | 0 |
| New Mexico A&M | | – | | 5 | – | 2 | – | 0 |
| Montana A&M | | – | | 4 | – | 2 | – | 1 |
| Arizona | | – | | 5 | – | 3 | – | 0 |
| California | | – | | 8 | – | 5 | – | 0 |
| Tempe Normal | | – | | 3 | – | 2 | – | 0 |
| University Farm | | – | | 3 | – | 2 | – | 0 |
| Cheney Normal | | – | | 1 | – | 1 | – | 0 |
| Montana | | – | | 2 | – | 2 | – | 2 |
| Willamette | | – | | 2 | – | 2 | – | 1 |
| USC | | – | | 3 | – | 4 | – | 0 |
| Saint Mary's | | – | | 3 | – | 7 | – | 0 |
| Nevada | | – | | 0 | – | 6 | – | 0 |

The 1915 Cheney Normal football team represented the State Normal School at Cheney—now known as Eastern Washington University—as an independent during the 1915 college football season. Led by third-year head coach Albert Fertsch, Cheney Normal compiled a record of 1–1.

== Schedule ==
| Date | Opponent | Site | Result | Attendance | Source |
|---|---|---|---|---|---|
| October 29 | Whitworth | Cheney, WA | W 6–0 | | |
| November 12 | at Whitworth | Spokane, WA | L 2–13 | 300 | |
