= 1915 University Farm football team =

American college football season

1915 University Farm football
- Conference: Independent
- Record: 3–2
- Head coach: Robert E. Harmon (1st season)
- Captain: Hira Hall

1915 Western college football independents records
	Conf.			Overall
Team	W	L	T	W		L		T
Hawaii		–		5	–	1	–	1
New Mexico		–		3	–	1	–	0
New Mexico A&M		–		5	–	2	–	0
Montana A&M		–		4	–	2	–	1
Arizona		–		5	–	3	–	0
California		–		8	–	5	–	0
Tempe Normal		–		3	–	2	–	0
University Farm		–		3	–	2	–	0
Cheney Normal		–		1	–	1	–	0
Montana		–		2	–	2	–	2
Willamette		–		2	–	2	–	1
USC		–		3	–	4	–	0
Saint Mary's		–		3	–	7	–	0
Nevada		–		0	–	6	–	0

The 1915 University Farm football team represented the University Farm—now known as the University of California, Davis—as an independent during the 1915 college football season. Although "University Farm" was the formal name for the school and team, in many newspaper articles from the time it was called "Davis Farm". The team had no nickname in 1915, with the "Aggie" term being introduced in 1922. Led by Robert E. Harmon in his first and only season as head coach, the team compiled a record of 3–2 and was outscored its opponents 54 to 51 for the season. The University Farm played home games in Davis, California.

1915 was the first year that University Farm competed in intercollegiate football.

== Schedule ==
Date	Opponent	Site	Result	Source
October 9	Saint Mary's	Davis, CA	L 0–9	
October 16	California freshmen	California Field; Berkeley, CA	W 10–7	
October 23	vs. Nevada	Carson City, NV	W 14–10	
	California third varsity		L 6–14	
November 25	at San Francisco National Club	California Field; Berkeley, CA	W 21–14	
