= 1915 Arizona Wildcats football team =

American college football season

1915 Arizona Wildcats football
- Conference: Independent
- Record: 5–3
- Head coach: Pop McKale (2nd season)
- Captain: William Asa Porter

1915 Western college football independents records
| | Conf. | | | Overall |
| Team | W | L | T | W | | L | | T |
|---|---|---|---|---|---|---|---|---|
| Hawaii | | – | | 5 | – | 1 | – | 1 |
| New Mexico | | – | | 3 | – | 1 | – | 0 |
| New Mexico A&M | | – | | 5 | – | 2 | – | 0 |
| Montana A&M | | – | | 4 | – | 2 | – | 1 |
| Arizona | | – | | 5 | – | 3 | – | 0 |
| California | | – | | 8 | – | 5 | – | 0 |
| Tempe Normal | | – | | 3 | – | 2 | – | 0 |
| University Farm | | – | | 3 | – | 2 | – | 0 |
| Cheney Normal | | – | | 1 | – | 1 | – | 0 |
| Montana | | – | | 2 | – | 2 | – | 2 |
| Willamette | | – | | 2 | – | 2 | – | 1 |
| USC | | – | | 3 | – | 4 | – | 0 |
| Saint Mary's | | – | | 3 | – | 7 | – | 0 |
| Nevada | | – | | 0 | – | 6 | – | 0 |

The 1915 Arizona Wildcats football team was an American football team that represented the University of Arizona as an independent during the 1915 college football season. In its second season under head coach Pop McKale, the team compiled a 5–3 record and outscored opponents, 152 to 34. The team captain was William Asa Porter.

== Schedule ==
| Date | Time | Opponent | Site | Result | Source |
|---|---|---|---|---|---|
| | | Tucson High School | Tucson, AZ | W 19–0 (possibly exhibition) | |
| October 2 | | at Douglas YMCA | Douglas, AZ | W 14–0 | |
| October 9 | | Tempe Normal | Tucson, AZ (rivalry) | W 7–0 | |
| October 16 | | vs. Phoenix Indian School | Tempe, AZ | W 56–0 | |
| October 23 | | at Pomona | Claremont, CA | W 7–3 | |
| October 30 | | vs. 22nd Infantry | Douglas, AZ | W 49–0 | |
| November 6 | 2:15 p.m. | at New Mexico A&M | Las Cruces, NM | L 0–3 | |
| November 9 | | at Silver City Normal | Silver City, NM | L 0–6 | |
| November 25 | | Whittier | Arizona field; Tucson, AZ | L 0–22 | |
