= 1915 University of New Mexico football team =

American college football season

1915 University of New Mexico football
- Conference: Independent
- Record: 3–1
- Head coach: Ralph Hutchinson (5th season)
- Home stadium: Hopewell Field

1915 Western college football independents records
	Conf.			Overall
Team	W	L	T	W		L		T
Hawaii		–		5	–	1	–	1
New Mexico		–		3	–	1	–	0
New Mexico A&M		–		5	–	2	–	0
Montana A&M		–		4	–	2	–	1
Arizona		–		5	–	3	–	0
California		–		8	–	5	–	0
Tempe Normal		–		3	–	2	–	0
University Farm		–		3	–	2	–	0
Cheney Normal		–		1	–	1	–	0
Montana		–		2	–	2	–	2
Willamette		–		2	–	2	–	1
USC		–		3	–	4	–	0
Saint Mary's		–		3	–	7	–	0
Nevada		–		0	–	6	–	0

The 1915 University of New Mexico football team was an American football team that represented the University of New Mexico as an independent during the 1915 college football season. In its fifth season under head coach Ralph Hutchinson (who was also the university's first athletic director), the team compiled a 3–1 record and outscored opponents by a total of 92 to 6. Kenneth C. Balcomb was the team captain.

== Schedule ==
Date	Opponent	Site	Result	Attendance	Source
October 11	New Mexico Military	Fairgrounds; Albuquerque, NM	L 3–6		
October 23	Albuquerque Indian School	Hopewell Field; Albuquerque, NM	W 56–0		
November 13	Albuquerque Indian School	Hopewell Field; Albuquerque, NM	W 20–0		
November 25	at New Mexico A&M	Las Cruces, NM (rivalry)	W 13–0		
