= Frank Lone Star =

American football player (1887–1915)

Profile
- Positions: Guard, tackle

Personal information
- Born: January 27, 1887; Wisconsin, U.S.
- Died: October 30, 1915 (aged 28); Shell Lake, Wisconsin, U.S.
- Listed height: 5 ft 11 in (1.80 m)
- Listed weight: 200 lb (91 kg)

Career information
- College: Carlisle Indian Industrial School

Career history
- Columbus Panhandles (1920)
- Stats at Pro Football Reference

Frank Lone Star (1887–1915) was a professional football player for the Columbus Panhandles in 1920. He played at the collegiate level at Carlisle Indian Industrial School.

== Biography ==
Frank Lone Star was born on January 27, 1887, in Wisconsin. Lone Star (often written as Lonestar) attended Carlisle Indian School but there is no record of him having played on the varsity football team. He died on October 30, 1915, in Shell Lake, Wisconsin, of heart problems brought on by tuberculosis. It appears that someone else played for the Columbus Panhandles under his name. Author Tom Benjey speculated that it may have been Lone Star Dietz.
