= 1916 Rose Bowl =

American college football game

1916 Tournament East-West football game
- 2nd Rose Bowl Game
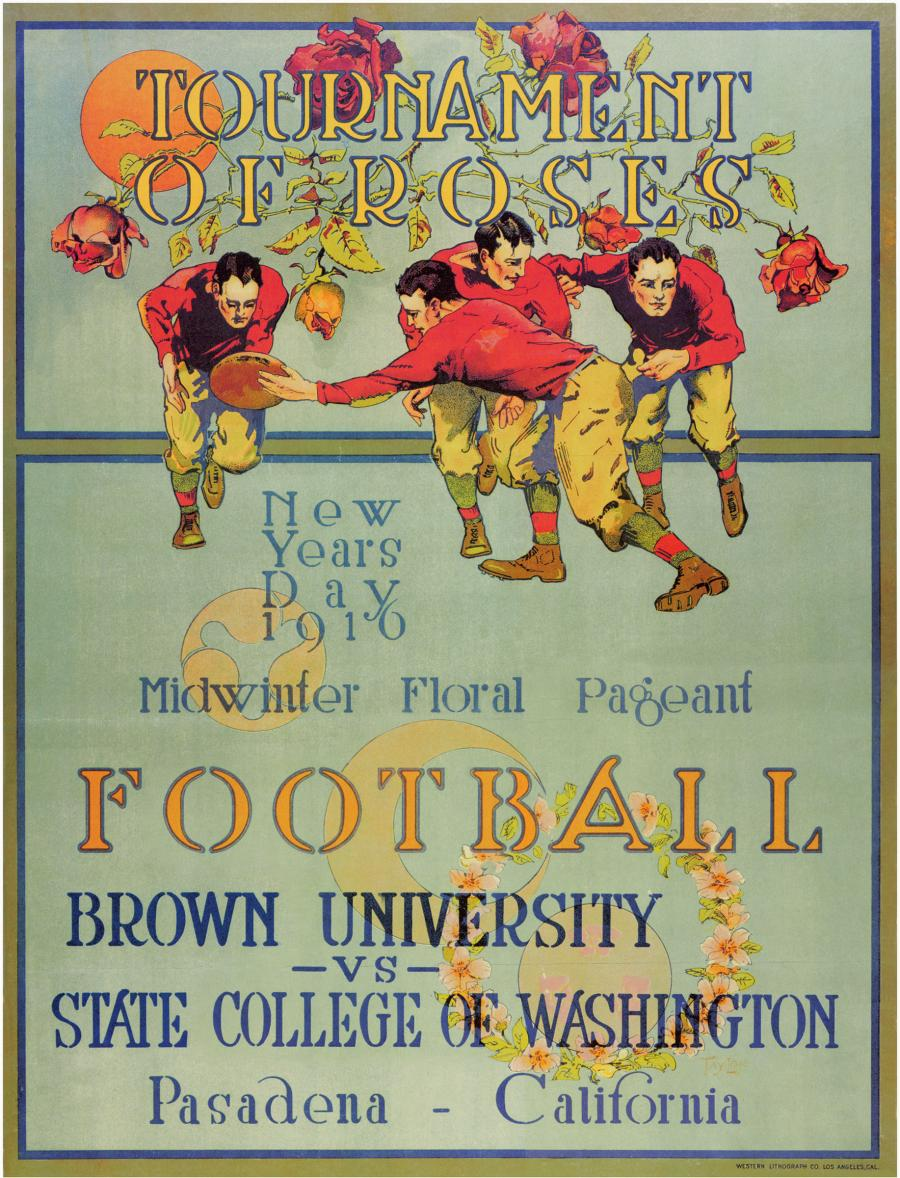
- Game poster
| Brown Bears | Washington State |
| (5–3–1) | (6–0) |
| 0 | 14 |
| Head coach: Eddie N. Robinson | Head coach: William Henry Dietz |
| | 1 | 2 | 3 | 4 | Total |
|---|---|---|---|---|---|
| Brown | 0 | 0 | 0 | 0 | 0 |
| Washington State | 0 | 0 | 7 | 7 | 14 |
- Date: January 1, 1916
- Season: 1915
- Stadium: Tournament Park
- Location: Pasadena, California
- MVP: Carl Dietz, Washington State
- Favorite: Brown by 2 to 1
- Referee: Walter Eckersall
- Attendance: 10,000 (estimated)

Originally titled the "Tournament East-West football game," the second of what is now known as the Rose Bowl Game was played on January 1, 1916. The Rose Bowl game has been played annually since this game.

The first game, the 1902 Tournament East-West football game, was so lopsided that for the next 13 years, the Tournament of Roses officials ran chariot races, ostrich races, and other various events instead of football. But, on New Year's Day 1916, football returned to stay as undefeated Washington State College defeated Brown University in this first annual Tournament of Roses football game.

== Tournament Park ==
Before the Rose Bowl stadium was built for the 1923 game, the Rose Bowl was played in Pasadena's Tournament Park, approximately three miles (5 km) from the current stadium. It is best known for being the site of the first edition in 1902, and the second to eighth (1916 to 1922) before the current stadium opened in the fall of 1922. Its capacity at the time was 43,000.

== Teams ==
Team captains Andrews of Brown (left) and Clark of Washington State, together with referee Walter Eckersall of Chicago just before kickoff

Washington State had an undefeated season. They won 28–3 over Oregon, 29–0 over Oregon State, 41–0 over Idaho, 27–7 over Montana, 17–0 over Whitman and 48–0 over Gonzaga.

Brown lost 7–0 to Amherst, 6–0 to Syracuse, and 16–7 to Harvard. They had a scoreless tie with Trinity. Brown outscored its opponents 167–32 that year, beating Rhode Island 38–0, Williams 33–0, Vermont 46–0, Yale 3-0 and Carlisle 39–3. Brown was chosen as the Eastern representative with a 5–3–1 record.

The Tournament of Roses committee were responsible for selecting and inviting the teams. Brown's victories over Yale and Carlisle were deciding factors for inviting Brown to participate.

== Game summary ==
Fritz Pollard became the first African-American to play in the Rose Bowl Game. He was limited to 47 yards in 13 carries during the game. Wallace Wade played on the line. The game was played in a cold quagmire of mud from several days of rain.

=== Scoring ===
| | 1 | 2 | 3 | 4 | Total |
|---|---|---|---|---|---|
| Brown | 0 | 0 | 0 | 0 | 0 |
| Washington State | 0 | 0 | 7 | 7 | 14 |

| Qtr. | Team | Scoring play | Score |
|---|---|---|---|
| 3 | WSU | Ralph Boone 3 yard rush, Arthur Durham kick | WSU 7–0 |
| 4 | WSU | Carl Dietz 4 yard rush, Arthur Durham kick | WSU 14–0 |

=== Statistics ===
| Team stats | Wash. St. | Brown |
|---|---|---|
| First downs | 19 | 6 |
| Net Yards Rushing | 313 | 74 |
| Net Yards Passing | 0 | 12 |
| Total Yards | 313 | 86 |
| PC–PA–Int. | 0–2–2 | 1–3–1 |
| Punts Avg. | 7-37.0 | 13-29.3 |

== Aftermath ==
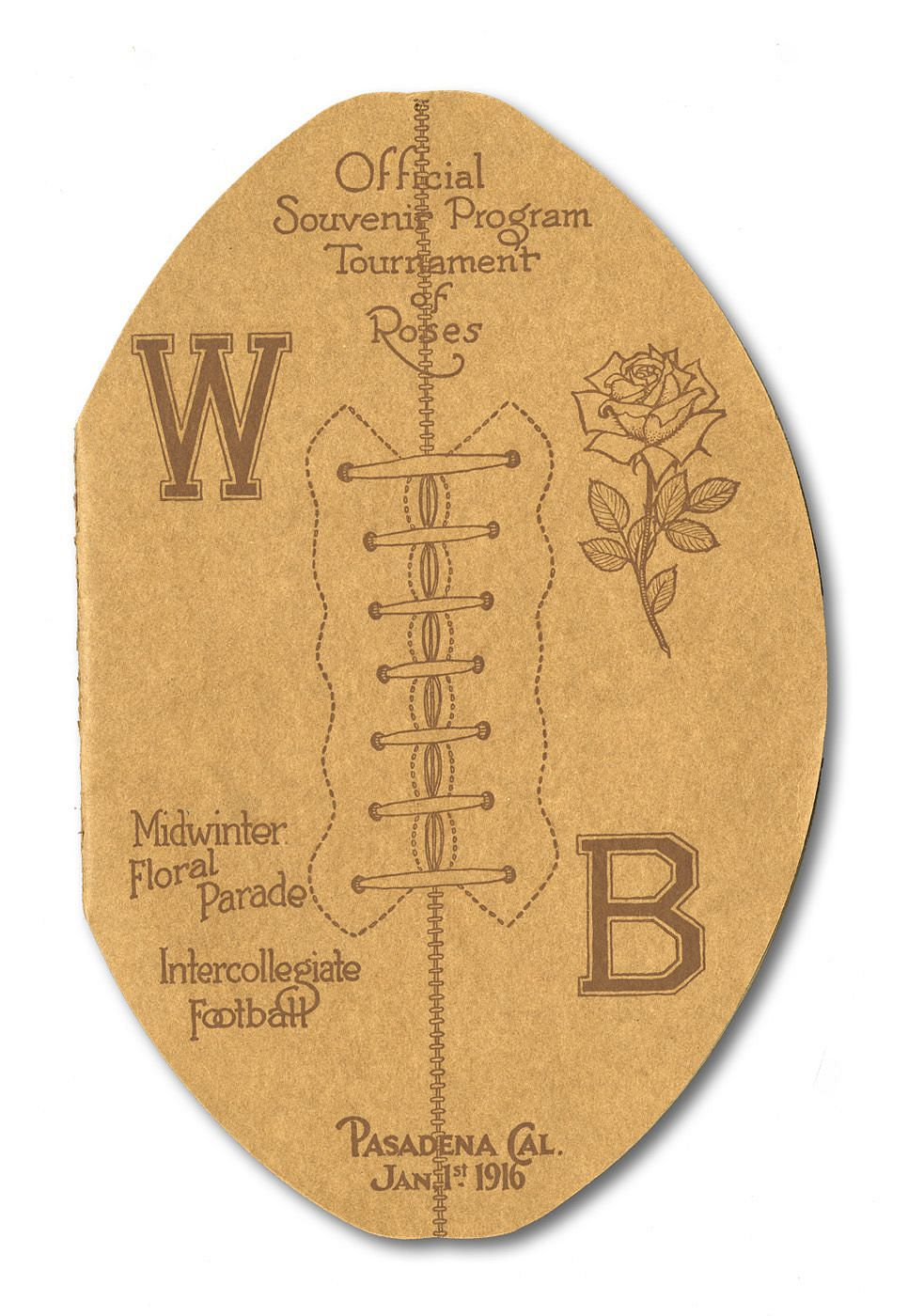
Souvenir Program

Coach William Henry "Lone Star" Dietz and his Washington State squad served as extras in the football film Tom Brown of Harvard each morning and then practiced for the bowl game in the afternoon. They were paid $100 for the movie work.

The Tournament of Roses organization continues to have a college football game to this day as part of the New Year's Day celebrations.

The Western and Northern universities permitted minority players, a situation that would eventually lead to the Pacific Coast Conference - Big Nine conference agreement for the 1947 Rose Bowl. Most Southern universities were still segregated until the 1960s. None of the Southeastern Conference schools had an African American athlete until 1966. The Cotton Bowl, Orange Bowl, and Sugar Bowl would not be integrated until 1948, 1955, and 1956 respectively.

Carl Dietz, the Washington State fullback, was named the Most Valuable Player of the game when the award was created in 1953 and selections were made retroactively. Later, Pollard was the first Black player named to the Walter Camp All-America team and became the first Black NFL head coach.

The official 2007 NCAA Division I football records book lists the attendance at 7,000. Washington State listed at 10,000 in its media guide.

The quarterback of the Washington State University team, Thomas Arthur Durham, later had a successful Naval career.

== Books ==
- Maxwell Stiles - The Rose Bowl: A Complete Action and Pictorial Exposition of Rose Bowl Football, Sportsmaster Publications (1946), ASIN: B0007FBNU4
