= Harry Applequist =

American football and baseball coach

Biographical details
- Born: August 1, 1890; Minneapolis, Minnesota, U.S.
- Died: November 1, 1976 (aged 86); Sacramento, California, U.S.

Playing career

Football
- 1912–1915: Washington State
- Position: Tackle

Coaching career (HC unless noted)

Football
- 1920–1925: Washington State (assistant)
- 1926–1928: Sacramento HS (CA)
- 1929–1941: Sacramento Junior College

Baseball
- 1923–1926: Washington State
- 1927–1929: Sacramento HS (CA)

Administrative career (AD unless noted)
- 1917–1926: Washington State (assistant AD)
- 1929–1942: Sacramento Junior College

Head coaching record
- Overall: 66–29–1 (college baseball)

Harry Alfred "Hack" Applequist (August 1, 1890 – November 1, 1976) was an American football and baseball coach and athletics administrator. He served as the head baseball coach at the State College of Washington—now known as Washington State University—from 1923 to 1926, compiling a record of 66–29–1. Applequist was the head football coach at Sacramento Junior College—now known as Sacramento City College—in Sacramento, California from 1929 to 1941.

A native of Marcus, Washington, Applequist played college football at Washington State from 1912 to 1915 and was honored as an all-Northwest tackle three consecutive seasons. He returned to Washington State in 1920 as an assistant football coach under Gus Welch. Applequist left Washington State in 1926 to become the football and baseball coach at Sacramento High School. Three years later he moved on to Sacramento Junior College. Applequist stepped down as head football coach at Sacramento Junior College to become the athletic director for all of Sacramento's schools. He was succeeded as head football coach by Johnny Baker.

Applequist died on November 1, 1976, at Sutter General Hospital in Sacramento.
