= Angel De Cora =

Ho-Chunk painter

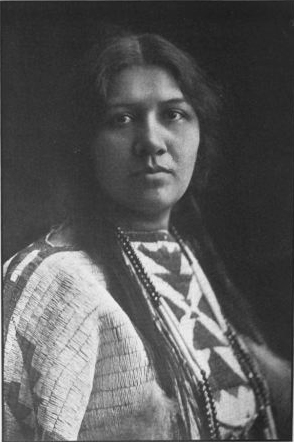
- Angel De Cora
- Born: Hinook-Mahiwi-Kalinaka; May 3, 1871; Thurston, Nebraska
- Died: February 6, 1919 (aged 47); Northampton, Massachusetts
- Known for: Painting & Illustration
- Movement: Tonalism

Angel De Cora Dietz (1871–1919) was a Ho-Chunk painter, illustrator, Native American rights advocate, and teacher at Carlisle Indian School. A member of the Winnebago Tribe of Nebraska, she was a well-known Native American artist before World War I.

== Background ==
Angel De Cora, also written Angel DeCora, or Hinook-Mahiwi-Kalinaka (Fleecy Cloud Floating in Place), was born at the Winnebago Agency in Dakota County (now Thurston), Nebraska, on May 3, 1871. She was the daughter of David Tall Decora, a Ho-Chunk man with French ancestry and a son of the Little Decorah, a hereditary chief. Angel was born into the Thunderbird clan. Her English and Ho-Chunk names were chosen by a relative who was asked to name her, opened the Bible, and the word "angel" caught her eye. Her mother was a member of the influential LaMere family.

Angel was kidnapped at a young age from the agency and sent to school at the Hampton Agricultural and Industrial School in Hampton, Virginia. She would go on to describe how it happened as follows: "A strange white man appeared on the reservation and asked her, through an interpreter, if she would like to ride on a steam car; with six other children, she decided to try it, and when the ride was ended she found herself in Hampton. '[It was] three years later when I returned to my mother' says Angel De Cora. 'She told me that for months she wept and mourned for me. My father, the old chief and his wife had died, and with them, the old Indian life was gone.'"

As granddaughter to the chief of the Ho-Chunk tribe, De Cora existed in a position of influence since "among most plains people, power and cultural knowledge were accumulated by and dispensed through females" (35). Although De Cora's mother was French in origin, De Cora would be expected to follow in her grandmothers' footsteps in passing along Ho-Chunk cultural practices. "During the summers we lived on the Reservation, my mother cultivating her garden and my father playing the chief's son. During the winter we used to follow the chase away off the Reservation, along rivers and forests. My father provided not only for his family then, but his father's also. We were always moving camp. As a child, my life was ideal. In all my childhood I never received a crossword from anyone, but nevertheless, my training was incessant. About as early as I can remember, I was lulled to sleep night after night by my father's or grandparent's recital of laws and customs that had regulated the daily life of my grandsires for generations and generations, and in the morning I was awakened by the same counseling. Under the influence of such precepts and customs, I acquired the general bearing of a well-counseled Indian child, rather reserved, respectful, and mild in manner."

== Education, mentors, and early work ==
Taken from her family and placed into the Hampton Normal and Agricultural Institute, Angel de Cora was to accomplish the U.S. federal government's vision of "educating Indian girls in the hope that women trained as good housewives would help their mates assimilate" into U.S. mainstream culture. De Cora studied at a local preparatory school in Hampton, Virginia, working for a local family. Afterward, De Cora was educated at Burnham Classical School for Girls. She then studied art at the art department of the Smith College. She studied specifically illustration at Drexel Institute (now Drexel University).

De Cora was one of the very few students who were accepted into Howard Pyle's competitive summer art program, where Pyle lauded De Cora as "not only talent but genius." Despite knowing that as a woman and as a Native American, De Cora faced more challenges in enjoying success than her peers, Pyle's belief in her was so strong that he still provided her with contacts at magazines and encouraged her to illustrate and compose her own semi-autobiographical stories, "The Sick Child" and "Gray Wolf's Daughter," which were later published in the February and November 1899 issues of Harper's Monthly.

During the summer of 1898, under Pyle's guidance, De Cora painted the oil painting Lafayette's Headquarters, which was one of her only works featuring non-Indigenous subjects. She employed semi-Impressionistic brushwork, which demonstrated Pyle's influence. Pyle and De Cora had a typical relationship a student and mentor do. However, Pyle's disregard for authenticity in traditional Indigenous attire, despite paying careful attention to historical accuracy when depicting the typical Caucasian attire and thus was often a source of contention. Another disagreement between the student and her mentor was how De Cora did not wish to emulate her teacher like her peers strived to; De Cora once informed Pyle that she was an American Indian and did not wish to paint exactly like a white man.

When De Cora left Philadelphia, she went to Boston and enrolled at the Cowles Art School to study life drawing under the tutelage of Joseph DeCamp. Decamp left after a year, but recommended her to The School of the Museum of Fine Arts, also in Boston, where she remained for the next two years, studying under Frank Benson and Edmund C. Tarbell, both of whom were known for their outdoor figure paintings and unique usage of light in their works. These mentors had a huge influence on De Cora's future works.

== Personal ==
De Cora was married to William Henry "Lone Star" Dietz (Wicarhpi Isnala), who claimed Dakota and German descent but his true background remains partially inconclusive. Dietz also taught at the Carlisle Indian School. He and De Cora met at the St. Louis World's Fair in 1904. In addition to his art, Dietz was a notable football player, and in 1915 he became head coach of Washington State; he later was the first head coach of the Washington Redskins.

== Art style ==
De Cora's art style blended Western techniques with traditional Native American styles. Her figures focused heavily on gesture, which is something that is used a lot in Native American pictographs. Because these illustrations were often accompanied with text, De Cora was able to make a traditionally Native American art form into something understandable to white Americans, without bastardizing the original artwork.

Most of her work would portray the Native American lifestyle through a feminized lens, which was something that was altogether unfamiliar to white Americans of the time. However, her portrayal of Native Americans was not static; she portrayed them as a changing people, and would blend Native American and EuroAmerican elements to demonstrate this change.

== Artwork ==
At the beginning of her career, De Cora developed her tonalist style through the influence of her instructor Dwight William Tryon. The Tonalist movement "focused on landscapes and imbued their works with an overall softness to simulate mist or fog in the atmosphere." In her tonalist art work, De Cora painted firelight to illuminate warm memories of her childhood life on the Nebraska plains after she settled far from home in the east". Her oil Painting, "for an Indian school exhibit, for the Pan-American Exposition in Buffalo, New York" demonstrates the technical prowess and emotional depth of her art. As she began to work with illustrator Howard Pyle, her style incorporated more illustration, and he encouraged her to visit the Fort Berthold Reservation in North Dakota in order to reconnect her to Native and Indigenous customs.

De Cora created the title-page designs for Natalie Curtis's The Indians' Book, a collection of Native American songs, stories, and artwork first published in 1907.

Originally holding a studio in the New York City, towards the end of her career, De Cora and her husband taught art at the Carlisle Indian Industrial School in Carlisle, Pennsylvania.

Unfortunately not much of De Cora's original paintings remain, but she illustrated her own stories published in Harper's Magazine and illustrated books. The 1911 Yellow Star: A Story of East West, by Elaine Goodale Eastman features illustrations by De Cora and her husband, William Henry Dietz. Her illustrations are rare for her time period because she portrayed Native Americans wearing contemporary clothing.

In some cases, De Cora is not included in the canon of significant Native American artists, as her artwork is now seen as "too Western in execution to be considered authentic Native American art." However, "in her day, the public crowned Angel 'the first real Indian artist.'"

== Group exhibitions ==
- 2019: Hearts of Our People: Native Women Artists, Minneapolis Institute of Art, Minneapolis, MN

== Death ==
At the age of 47, Angel De Cora developed influenza and pneumonia while staying at a friend's home in Northampton, and ultimately died in the Cooley Dickinson Hospital on 6 February 1919. She was buried in their family plot without a marker, as at the time, only blood relatives could have a headstone.

== Gallery ==
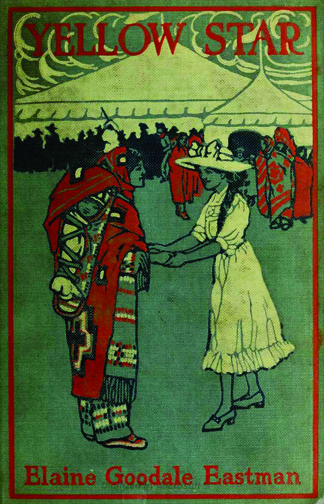
cover illustration by De Cora, 1911

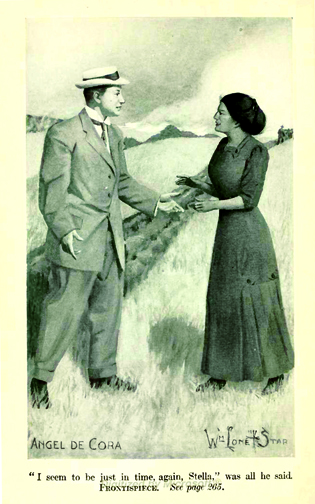
Frontispiece by De Cora and Dietz

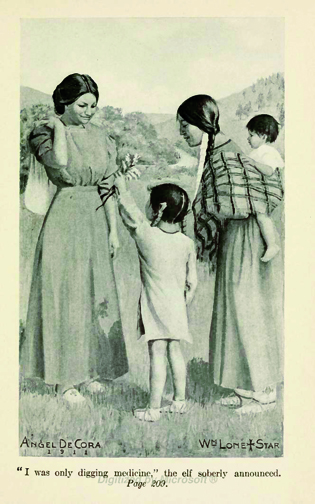
Illustration by De Cora and Dietz

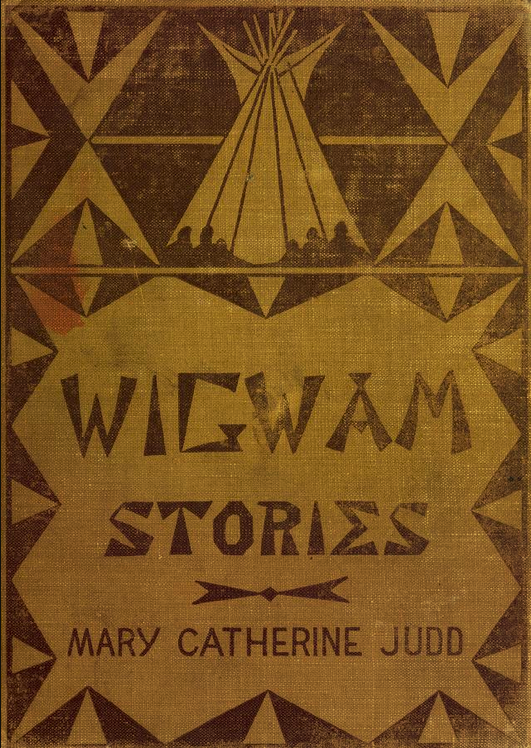
Illustrations by De Cora, 1901
