= Anson Cornell =

American football player, coach, and administrator (1890–1975)

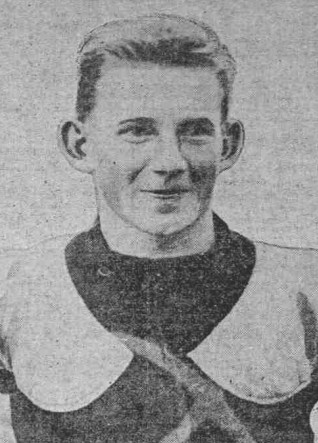

Biographical details
- Born: March 20, 1890; Eugene, Oregon, U.S.
- Died: November 7, 1975 (aged 85); Eugene, Oregon, U.S.

Playing career
- 1912–1915: Oregon

Coaching career (HC unless noted)
- 1917–1932: College of Idaho
- 1933–1935: Pacific (OR)

Administrative career (AD unless noted)
- 1933–1935: Pacific (OR)
- c. 1938: Oregon

Head coaching record
- Overall: 63–46–10

Accomplishments and honors

Championships
- 2 NWC (1926–1927)

Anson Black Cornell (March 20, 1890 – November 7, 1975) was an American college football player and coach and college athletics administrator. He served as the head football coach at the College of Idaho from 1917 to 1932 and at the Pacific University in Forest Grove, Oregon from 1933 to 1935.

== Head coaching record ==
| Year | Team | Overall | Conference | Standing | Bowl/playoffs |
|---|---|---|---|---|---|
College of Idaho Coyotes (Independent) (1917–1925)
| 1917 | College of Idaho | 1–0 | | | |
| 1918 | No team—World War I | | | | |
| 1919 | College of Idaho | 5–0 | | | |
| 1920 | College of Idaho | 4–1 | | | |
| 1921 | College of Idaho | 2–4 | | | |
| 1922 | College of Idaho | 3–2–1 | | | |
| 1923 | College of Idaho | 2–3–1 | | | |
| 1924 | College of Idaho | 4–1–1 | | | |
| 1925 | College of Idaho | 4–2 | | | |
College of Idaho Coyotes (Northwest Conference) (1926–1932)
| 1926 | College of Idaho | 6–2 | 2–0 | 1st | |
| 1927 | College of Idaho | 6–1 | 5–0 | 1st | |
| 1928 | College of Idaho | 4–4 | 3–2 | T–2nd | |
| 1929 | College of Idaho | 4–4 | 3–2 | 3rd | |
| 1930 | College of Idaho | 3–4–1 | 2–2 | 4th | |
| 1931 | College of Idaho | 2–5 | 2–2 | 4th | |
| 1932 | College of Idaho | 3–3–1 | 0–2 | 6th | |
| College of Idaho: | | 53–36–5 | 17–10 | | |
Pacific Badgers (Northwest Conference) (1933–1935)
| 1933 | Pacific | 4–4 | 3–3 | T–3rd | |
| 1934 | Pacific | 4–2–3 | 3–1–1 | 3rd | |
| 1935 | Pacific | 2–4–2 | 1–3–2 | 6th | |
| Pacific: | | 10–10–5 | 7–7–3 | | |
| Total: | | 63–46–10 | | | |
National championship Conference title Conference division title or championship game berth
