= Francis Quirk =

American painter (1907–1974)

Francis J. Quirk
- Born: June 3, 1907; Pawtucket, Rhode Island, U.S.
- Died: February 5, 1974 (aged 66); Portland, Maine, U.S.
- Education: Rhode Island School of Design; University of Pennsylvania
- Known for: Painting
- Notable work: Portrait of Edgar Lee Masters in the National Portrait Gallery

Francis Joseph Quirk (June 3, 1907 – February 5, 1974) was an American artist, educator, museum curator, and TV personality. He is best known for his paintings of Edgar Lee Masters and Carl Sandburg, as well as his affiliation with Lehigh University as a professor and curator.

== Early life and education ==
Francis Quirk was born on June 3, 1907, in Pawtucket, Rhode Island. His parents Edward and Anne (née O’Neil) lived on 30 Waldo Street in Pawtucket, Rhode Island. He was the second of five children, the others being an older brother Edward, a younger brother Henry, younger sister Anna M. and younger sister Helen M.

Quirk completed his undergraduate work at the Rhode Island School of Design where he was the co-founder of a short-lived student humor publication, The Salamander. He completed his certificate in 1929 and his post graduate work in 1930. Upon graduation, he received the Trustees Post-Graduate Scholarship. During this year he served on the staff of the "Student Designer" in the Art Department. He later continued post-graduate studies in 1941–1942 at the University of Pennsylvania. Biographies also list him as training in Provincetown, Massachusetts, Woodstock, New York, France and Italy. He also studied under J. R. Frazier and F. Sisson.

== Career ==
Quirk was an art teacher from 1930 until 1935 at the Montgomery School, for boys in grades 1–12 in Wynnewood, Pennsylvania. While teaching at the school, Quirk was quite active outside the classroom and establishing himself as a talented artist.

In 1932, Quirk successfully competed for a place at the Louis Comfort Tiffany Foundation that allowed him to spend three months at Tiffany's estate at Laurelton Hall in Cold Spring Harbor on Long Island. Judges for the competition included impressionist painter Child Hassam and sculptor Daniel Chester French.

Also in 1932, Quirk exhibited at the Provincetown Art Association a painting of Fred Fischer's Place. He also won the Juror's Prize at the Providence Art Club's Annual Exhibition with his painting of Scott Adams III.

=== Ogontz College ===
In 1935, Quirk began a 15-year relationship with the Ogontz School for Young Ladies. For the first 5 years he was Professor of Art, Drawing, and Painting. For the last 10 years he was Head of the Art Department. While at Ogontz, on September 12, 1936, he married Anna F. Feeley with whom he had two children, Ada-Lee and Jaimie. Anna also served on the faculty of Ogontz College. She also was a graduate of the Rhode Island School of Design, was Supervisor of Art in Cranston, RI public school system, founded the Cranston School of Creative Arts and exhibited her paintings in Maine.

During his time at Ogontz, his reputation as a portrait painter grew considerably. He also painted Carl Sandburg at the request of Abby Sutherland Brown. The Writers Guild of Pennsylvania commissioned a portrait of Edgar Lee Masters in 1946 that later became the 70th painting to enter the collection of the US National Portrait Gallery.

In 1940, Quirk exhibited a painting of him and his wife attending a concert at the Pennsylvania Academy of Fine Art.

Towards the end of Quirk's tenure at Ogontz he also was a Professor of Contemporary Perspective at Philadelphia's Hussian School of Art. He taught there from 1948 to 1950, shortly after the school's founding by John Hussian in 1946 with the support of principals at the Philadelphia Museum of Art.

=== Lehigh University ===
1950 was a landmark year for Quirk as he made a major transition to the all-male Lehigh University where he took over from Garth Howland as in the Fine Art Department and Director of Exhibits. In his first year he would expand the exhibit space with the establishment of the Memorial Gallery. He would later win the university's Lindbeck Award for distinguished teaching in 1965.

As Curator of the Collection he made three significant moves. First, he brought order through a comprehensive cataloging of the collection. Second, he created better display spaces and finally he began its expansion through donations from prominent alumni such as Ralph Wilson of the Timken Company and Eugene Grace of Bethlehem Steel and through borrowing. He also established lending relationships with the Ranger Fund, National Academy of Design and the Smithsonian Institution. Quirk also ran numerous exhibitions and established a program for exhibiting student art.

Technically, Quirk was an excellent draftsman who worked in a variety of medium and styles. At the time, the art world was in revolution with modern movements such as cubism and abstract art emerging. Quirk experimented in cubism, but largely remained true to a realistic style of portraiture and marine subjects.

In the media, Quirk also hosted television programs "Art as We See It" and "It's Happening There" that were broadcast on Bethlehem, Pennsylvania Station, WGPA. He also hosted programs on Philadelphia's WFIL station: "These our Own" and "You Should Know What You Like."

During his time at Lehigh Quirk bought a home in the Mountain Club in Prescott, Arizona. He named the Pine Drive home Peterspen and was active in the Mountain Club community teaching art classes. He would spend two years on special assignment in Switzerland from 1959 to 1961.

Quirk retired from teaching in 1969 but remained affiliated with the school as professor emeritus through 1972 and had a solo show there in 1973. That show featured works from his time at the Ossabaw Island Foundation who had awarded him a grant in 1968 and a fellowship in 1972.

== Retirement ==
Quirk retired to Peterspen North, his home in the Kinney Shores area of Saco, Maine. He had spent many summers there and served as President of the Kinney Shores Association. He also exhibited his work at the Old Orchard Art Association where he had been honored with a prize in 1962 and sold his work through local galleries. He died on February 5, 1974, in the National Medical Care center in Portland Maine. He was buried in the Laurel Hill Cemetery in Saco, Maine.

== Awards and exhibitions ==
- 1932, Louis Comfort Tiffany Foundation Fellowship
- 1932, Providence Art Club, Junior Prize
- 1940, Pennsylvania Academy of Fine Art
- 1946, Solo Show Women's City Club of Philadelphia
- 1950, Who's Who in the East
- 1950, Who's Who in Art
- 1956, Ocean Park Judges Award
- 1962, Old Orchard Award
- 1965, Lindback Award for distinguished teaching Lehigh University
- Grantee 1968 and Fellow 1972, Ossabaw Island Project
- 1970, Impossible Art Exhibition
- 1973, Solo show, Allentown College of St. Francis de Sales
- 1974, Solo show, Lehigh University Art Gallery

== Collections ==
National Portrait Gallery, Raclin Murphy Museum of Art (University of Notre Dame), Canton Art Institute, Georgia Museum of Art, Colby College (President Strider), Lehigh University Art Galleries, Monroe County Medical Center, American Consulate Zurich, Wilson College, Allentown College, Ships Museum (Savannah), Stroudsburg Hospital, Parker College.
