= John Peden (American football) =

American football coach

Coaching career (HC unless noted)
- 1915: Hawaii

Head coaching record
- Overall: 5–1–1

John Peden was an American college football coach. He served as the head coach at the University of Hawaii during the 1915 season.

== Head coaching record ==
Year	Team	Overall	Conference	Standing	Bowl/playoffs
Hawaii Deans (Independent) (1915)
1915	Hawaii	5–1–1			
Hawaii:		5–1–1			
Total:		5–1–1			
