= List of North Carolina Tar Heels football seasons =

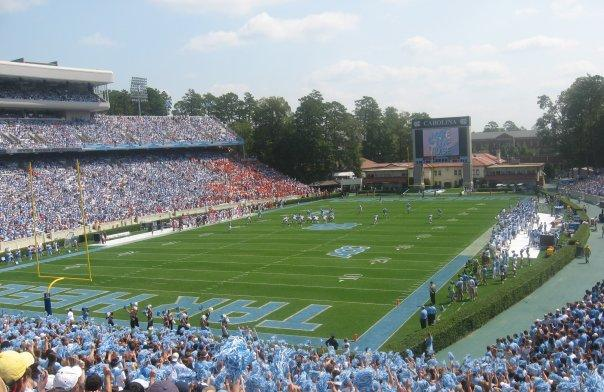
Kenan Stadium, where the Tar Heels have played since 1927

This is a list of seasons completed by the North Carolina Tar Heels football team of the National Collegiate Athletic Association (NCAA) Division I Football Bowl Subdivision (FBS). Since the team's creation in 1888, the Tar Heels have participated in more than 1,100 officially sanctioned games, including 30 bowl games.

The Tar Heels have been a member of a few conferences. Initially competing as an independent school, North Carolina joined the Southern Intercollegiate Athletic Association in 1895, where it was a member until 1921. Between 1922 and 1952, the Tar Heels competed in the Southern Conference, where it won 3 conference championships. In 1953, North Carolina joined the Atlantic Coast Conference as a founding member, where it has been a member ever since.

== Seasons ==
Conference champions	Bowl game berth	Division champions

Year	Coach(es)	Conference	Conference Record			Conference Finish	Overall Record			Bowl/Postseason	Final ranking	
Year	Coach(es)	Conference	Wins	Losses	Ties	Conference Finish	Wins	Losses	Ties	Bowl/Postseason	AP	Coaches'
North Carolina Tar Heels
1888	No coach	Ind				—	0	2	0	—	N/A	N/A
1889	No coach/Hector Cowan	Ind				—	2	2	0	—	N/A	N/A
1890	No games played											
1891	No coach	Ind				—	0	2	0	—	N/A	N/A
1892	No coach	Ind				—	5	1	0	—	N/A	N/A
1893	William J. "Yup" Cook	Ind				—	3	4	0	—	N/A	N/A
1894	Vernon K. Irvine	Ind				—	6	3	0	—	N/A	N/A
1895	Thomas Trenchard	Ind				—	7	1	1	—	N/A	N/A
1896	Gordon Johnston	Ind				—	3	4	1	—	N/A	N/A
1897	William A. Reynolds	Ind				—	7	3	0	—	N/A	N/A
1898	William A. Reynolds	Ind				—	9	0	0	—	N/A	N/A
1899	William A. Reynolds	Ind				—	7	3	1	—	N/A	N/A
1900	William A. Reynolds	Ind				—	4	1	3	—	N/A	N/A
1901	Charles O. Jenkins	Ind				—	7	2	0	—	N/A	N/A
1902	Herman Olcott	Ind				—	5	1	3	—	N/A	N/A
1903	Herman Olcott	Ind				—	6	3	0	—	N/A	N/A
1904	Robert R. Brown	Ind				—	5	2	2	—	N/A	N/A
1905	Bill Warner	Ind				—	4	3	1	—	N/A	N/A
1906	Willis Kienholz	Ind				—	1	4	2	—	N/A	N/A
1907	Otis Lamson	Ind				—	4	4	1	—	N/A	N/A
1908	Edward L. Greene	Ind				—	3	3	3	—	N/A	N/A
1909	Arthur Brides	Ind				—	5	2	0	—	N/A	N/A
1910	Arthur Brides	Ind				—	3	6	0	—	N/A	N/A
1911	Branch Bocock	Ind				—	6	1	1	—	N/A	N/A
1912	C. W. Martin	Ind				—	3	4	1	—	N/A	N/A
1913	Thomas Trenchard	Ind				—	5	4	0	—	N/A	N/A
1914	Thomas Trenchard	Ind				—	10	1	0	—	N/A	N/A
1915	Thomas Trenchard	Ind				—	4	3	1	—	N/A	N/A
1916	Thomas Campbell	Ind				—	5	4	0	—	N/A	N/A
1917	Thomas Campbell	No games - World War I										
1918	Thomas Campbell	No games - World War I										
1919	Thomas Campbell	Ind				—	4	3	1	—	N/A	N/A
1920	Myron Fuller	Ind				—	2	6	0	—	N/A	N/A
1921	Bill Fetzer	Ind				—	5	2	2	—	N/A	N/A
1922	Bill Fetzer	SoCon	5	0	0	1st	9	1	0	—	N/A	N/A
1923	Bill Fetzer	SoCon	3	1	1	12th	5	3	1	—	N/A	N/A
1924	Bill Fetzer	SoCon	2	3	0	14th	4	5	0	—	N/A	N/A
1925	Bill Fetzer	SoCon	4	0	1	3rd	7	1	1	—	N/A	N/A
1926	Chuck Collins	SoCon	3	3	0	10th	4	5	0	—	N/A	N/A
1927	Chuck Collins	SoCon	2	5	0	19th	4	6	0	—	N/A	N/A
1928	Chuck Collins	SoCon	2	2	2	11th	5	3	2	—	N/A	N/A
1929	Chuck Collins	SoCon	7	1	0	3rd	9	1	0	—	N/A	N/A
1930	Chuck Collins	SoCon	4	2	2	8th	5	3	2	—	N/A	N/A
1931	Chuck Collins	SoCon	2	3	3	13th	4	3	3	—	N/A	N/A
1932	Chuck Collins	SoCon	2	5	1	17th	3	5	2	—	N/A	N/A
1933	Chuck Collins	SoCon	2	1	0	3rd	4	5	0	—	N/A	N/A
1934	Carl Snavely	SoCon	2	0	1	2nd	7	1	1	—	N/A	N/A
1935	Carl Snavely	SoCon	4	1	0	2nd	8	1	0	—	N/A	N/A
1936	Raymond Wolf	SoCon	6	1	0	2nd	8	2	0	—	—	N/A
1937	Raymond Wolf	SoCon	4	0	1	2nd	7	1	1	—	19	N/A
1938	Raymond Wolf	SoCon	4	1	0	4th	6	2	1	—	—	N/A
1939	Raymond Wolf	SoCon	5	1	0	3rd	8	1	1	—	—	N/A
1940	Raymond Wolf	SoCon	3	2	0	5th	6	4	0	—	—	N/A
1941	Raymond Wolf	SoCon	2	4	0	11th	3	7	0	—	—	N/A
1942	Jim Tatum	SoCon	3	1	1	4th	5	2	2	—	—	N/A
1943	Tom Young	SoCon	2	2	0	5th	6	3	0	—	—	N/A
1944	Gene McEver	SoCon	0	3	1	9th	1	7	1	—	—	N/A
1945	Carl Snavely	SoCon	2	2	0	7th	5	5	0	—	—	N/A
1946	Carl Snavely	SoCon	4	0	1	1st	8	2	1	Lost 1947 Sugar Bowl vs. Georgia, 10-20	9	N/A
1947	Carl Snavely	SoCon	4	1	0	2nd	8	2	0	—	9	N/A
1948	Carl Snavely	SoCon	4	0	1	2nd	9	1	1	Lost 1949 Sugar Bowl vs. Oklahoma, 6-14	3	N/A
1949	Carl Snavely	SoCon	5	0	0	1st	7	4	0	Lost 1950 Cotton Bowl Classic vs. Rice, 13-27	16	N/A
1950	Carl Snavely	SoCon	3	2	1	7th	3	5	2	—	—	—
1951	Carl Snavely	SoCon	2	3	0	10th	2	8	0	—	—	—
1952	Carl Snavely	SoCon	1	2	0	12th	2	6	0	—	—	—
1953	George T. Barclay	ACC	2	3	0	T-3rd	4	6	0	—	—	—
1954	George T. Barclay	ACC	4	2	0	3rd	4	5	1	—	—	—
1955	George T. Barclay	ACC	3	3	0	4th	3	7	0	—	—	—
1956	Jim Tatum	ACC	2	3	1	5th	2	7	1	—	—	—
1957	Jim Tatum	ACC	4	3	0	4th	6	4	0	—	—	—
1958	Jim Tatum	ACC	4	3	0	4th	6	4	0	—	—	—
1959	Jim Hickey	ACC	5	2	0	2nd	5	5	0	—	—	—
1960	Jim Hickey	ACC	2	5	0	6th	3	7	0	—	—	—
1961	Jim Hickey	ACC	4	3	0	2nd	5	5	0	—	—	—
1962	Jim Hickey	ACC	3	4	0	T-4th	3	7	0	—	—	—
1963	Jim Hickey	ACC	6	1	0	1st	9	2	0	Won 1963 Gator Bowl vs. Air Force, 35-0	—	19
1964	Jim Hickey	ACC	4	3	0	T-3rd	5	5	0	—	—	—
1965	Jim Hickey	ACC	3	3	0	T-5th	4	6	0	—	—	—
1966	Jim Hickey	ACC	1	4	0	8th	2	8	0	—	—	—
1967	Bill Dooley	ACC	2	5	0	7th	2	8	0	—	—	—
1968	Bill Dooley	ACC	1	6	0	8th	3	7	0	—	—	—
1969	Bill Dooley	ACC	3	3	0	T-3rd	5	5	0	—	—	—
1970	Bill Dooley	ACC	5	2	0	T-2nd	8	4	0	Lost 1970 Peach Bowl vs. Arizona State, 26-48	—	—
1971	Bill Dooley	ACC	6	0	0	1st	9	3	0	Lost 1971 Gator Bowl vs. Georgia, 3-7	—	18
1972	Bill Dooley	ACC	6	0	0	1st	11	1	0	Won 1972 Sun Bowl vs. Texas Tech, 32-28	12	14
1973	Bill Dooley	ACC	1	5	0	6th	4	7	0	—	—	—
1974	Bill Dooley	ACC	4	2	0	T-2nd	7	5	0	Lost 1974 Sun Bowl vs. Mississippi State, 24-26	—	—
1975	Bill Dooley	ACC	1	4	1	6th	3	7	1	—	—	—
1976	Bill Dooley	ACC	4	1	0	2nd	9	3	0	Lost 1976 Peach Bowl vs. Kentucky, 0-21	—	—
1977	Bill Dooley	ACC	5	0	1	1st	8	3	1	Lost 1977 Liberty Bowl vs. Nebraska, 17-21	17	14
1978	Dick Crum	ACC	3	3	0	4th	5	6	0	—	—	—
1979	Dick Crum	ACC	3	3	0	5th	8	3	1	Won 1979 Gator Bowl vs. Michigan, 17-15	15	14
1980	Dick Crum	ACC	6	0	0	1st	11	1	0	Won 1980 Bluebonnet Bowl vs. Texas, 16-7	10	9
1981	Dick Crum	ACC	5	1	0	2nd	10	2	0	Won 1981 Gator Bowl vs. Arkansas, 31-27	9	8
1982	Dick Crum	ACC	3	3	0	T-3rd	8	4	0	Won 1982 Sun Bowl vs. Texas, 26-10	18	13
1983	Dick Crum	ACC	4	2	0	2nd	8	4	0	Lost 1983 Peach Bowl vs. Florida State, 3-28	—	—
1984	Dick Crum	ACC	3	2	1	3rd	5	5	1	—	—	—
1985	Dick Crum	ACC	3	4	0	5th	5	6	0	—	—	—
1986	Dick Crum	ACC	5	2	0	2nd	7	4	1	Lost 1986 Aloha Bowl vs. Arizona, 21-30	—	—
1987	Dick Crum	ACC	3	4	0	6th	5	6	0	—	—	—
1988	Mack Brown	ACC	1	6	0	7th	1	10	0	—	—	—
1989	Mack Brown	ACC	0	7	0	8th	1	10	0	—	—	—
1990	Mack Brown	ACC	3	3	1	5th	6	4	1	—	—	—
1991	Mack Brown	ACC	3	4	0	5th	7	4	0	—	—	—
1992	Mack Brown	ACC	5	3	0	3rd	9	3	0	Won 1993 Peach Bowl vs. Mississippi State, 21-17	19	18
1993	Mack Brown	ACC	6	2	0	2nd	10	3	0	Lost 1993 Gator Bowl vs. Alabama, 10-24	19	21
1994	Mack Brown	ACC	5	3	0	T-3rd	8	4	0	Lost 1994 Sun Bowl vs. Texas, 30-35	—	21
1995	Mack Brown	ACC	4	4	0	5th	7	5	0	Won Carquest Bowl vs. Arkansas, 20-10	—	—
1996	Mack Brown	ACC	6	2	—	2nd	10	2	— (Note: Overtime rules in college football were introduced in 1996, making ties impossible in the period since.)	Won 1997 Gator Bowl vs. West Virginia, 20-13	10	10
1997	Mack Brown	ACC	7	1	—	2nd	10	1	—	did not coach bowl game.	6	4
1997	Carl Torbush	ACC	—	—	—	—	1	0	—	Won 1998 Gator Bowl vs. Virginia Tech, 42–3	6	4
1998	Carl Torbush	ACC	4	4	—	T-4th	7	5	—	Won 1998 Las Vegas Bowl vs. San Diego State, 20-13	—	—
1999	Carl Torbush	ACC	2	6	—	9th	3	8	—	—	—	—
2000	Carl Torbush	ACC	3	5	—	6th	6	5	—	—	—	—
2001	John Bunting	ACC	5	3	—	3rd	8	5	—	Won 2001 Peach Bowl vs. Auburn, 16-10	—	—
2002	John Bunting	ACC	1	7	—	8th	3	9	—	—	—	—
2003	John Bunting	ACC	1	7	—	9th	2	10	—	—	—	—
2004	John Bunting	ACC	5	3	—	T-3rd	6	6	—	Lost 2004 Continental Tire Bowl vs. Boston College, 24-37	—	—
2005	John Bunting	ACC	4	4	—	4th (Coastal)	5	6	—	—	—	—
2006	John Bunting	ACC	2	6	—	5th (Coastal)	3	9	—	—	—	—
2007	Butch Davis	ACC	3	5	—	4th (Coastal)	4	8	—	—	—	—
2008 (Note: UNC decided to vacate all of its wins in 2008 and 2009 following an NCAA investigation. Vacated wins are in parentheses.)	Butch Davis	ACC	0 (4)	4	—	3rd (Coastal)	0 (8)	5	—	Lost 2008 Meineke Car Care Bowl vs. West Virginia, 30-31	—	—
2009	Butch Davis	ACC	0 (4)	4	—	4th (Coastal)	0 (8)	5	—	Lost 2009 Meineke Car Care Bowl vs. Pittsburgh, 17-19	—	—
2010	Butch Davis	ACC	4	4	—	3rd (Coastal)	8	5	—	Won 2010 Music City Bowl vs. Tennessee, 30-27 (2OT)	—	—
2011	Everett Withers	ACC	3	5	—	4th (Coastal)	7	6	—	Lost 2011 Independence Bowl vs. Missouri, 24-41	—	—
2012	Larry Fedora	ACC	5	3	—	T-1st (Coastal)	8	4	—	Ineligible	—	—
2013	Larry Fedora	ACC	4	4	—	5th (Coastal)	7	6	—	Won 2013 Belk Bowl vs. Cincinnati, 39-17	—	—
2014	Larry Fedora	ACC	4	4	—	3rd (Coastal)	6	7	—	Lost 2014 Quick Lane Bowl vs. Rutgers, 21-41	—	—
2015	Larry Fedora	ACC	8	0	—	1st (Coastal)	11	3	—	Lost 2015 Russell Athletic Bowl vs. Baylor, 38-49	15	15
2016	Larry Fedora	ACC	5	3	—	3rd (Coastal)	8	5	—	Lost 2016 Sun Bowl vs. Stanford, 23-25	—	—
2017	Larry Fedora	ACC	1	7	—	7th (Coastal)	3	9	—	—	—	—
2018	Larry Fedora	ACC	1	7	—	7th (Coastal)	2	9	—	—	—	—
2019	Mack Brown	ACC	4	4	—	4th (Coastal)	7	6	—	Won 2019 Military Bowl vs. Temple, 55-13	—	—
2020	Mack Brown	ACC	7	3	—	T-4th (Coastal)	8	4	—	Lost 2021 Orange Bowl vs. Texas A&M, 27-41	18	17
2021	Mack Brown	ACC	3	5	—	5th (Coastal)	6	7	—	Lost 2021 Duke's Mayo Bowl vs. South Carolina, 21-38	—	—
2022	Mack Brown	ACC	6	2	—	1st (Coastal)	9	5	—	Lost 2022 Holiday Bowl vs. Oregon, 27-28	—	—
2023	Mack Brown	ACC	4	4	—	T-5th	8	5	—	Lost 2023 Duke's Mayo Bowl vs. West Virginia, 10–30	—	—
2024	Mack Brown	ACC	3	5	—	T-10th	6	7	—	Lost 2024 Fenway Bowl vs. Connecticut, 14-27 (Note: Mack Brown did not coach the bowl game as he was fired at the conclusion of the regular season. Freddie Kitchens was named interim coach for the bowl game.)	—	—
2025	Bill Belichick	ACC	2	6	—	T-13	4	8	—	—	—	—
2026	Bill Belichick	ACC	2	4	—	—	5	5	—	—	—	—
Totals (Through November 14, 2026)			SoCon: 98–52–17 (.638) ACC: 259–257–5 (.502)				All-time: 744–589–54 (.556)			Postseason: 15–24 (.385)		
