= List of North Carolina Tar Heels head football coaches =

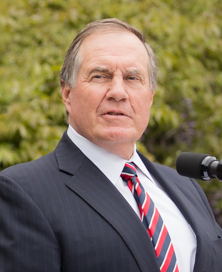
Bill Belichick is the current head coach.

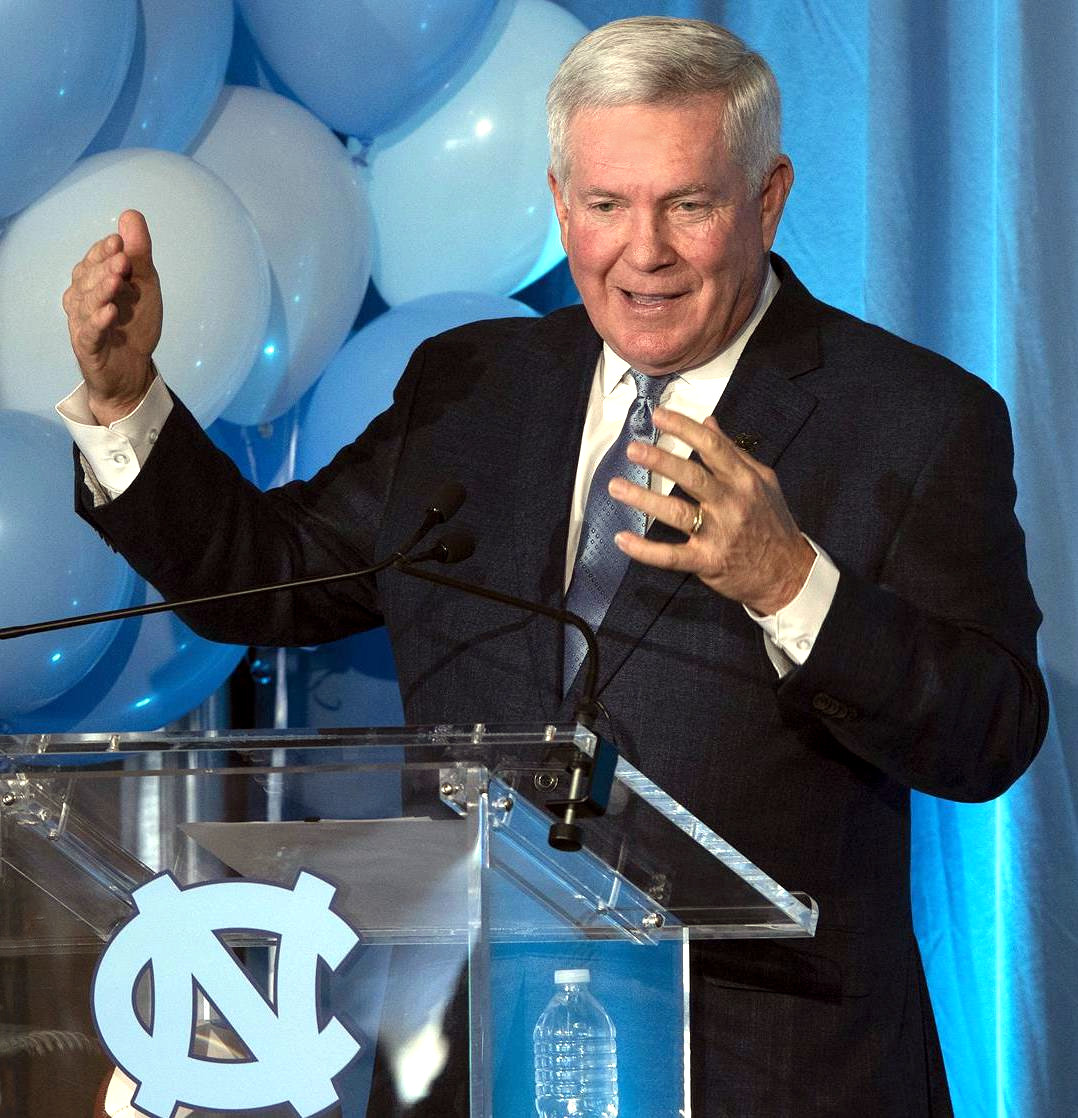
Mack Brown led the Tar Heels in two separate stints, the first from 1988–1997, and the second from 2019–2024.

The North Carolina Tar Heels college football team represents the University of North Carolina at Chapel Hill as a member of the Atlantic Coast Conference (ACC) at the NCAA Division I Football Bowl Subdivision (FBS) level. The program has had 35 head coaches, and two interim head coaches, since it began play during the 1888 season. Since December 2024, Bill Belichick has served as North Carolina's head coach.

The Tar Heels have played more than 1,100 games over 122 seasons. In that time, ten coaches have led the Tar Heels in postseason bowl games: Carl Snavely, Jim Hickey, Bill Dooley, Dick Crum, Mack Brown, Carl Torbush, John Bunting, Butch Davis, Everett Withers, and Larry Fedora. Four of those coaches also won conference championships: Snavely's teams captured two as a member of the Southern Conference (SoCon), and Hickey, Dooley, and Crum won a combined five in the ACC. Brothers Bill Fetzer and Bob Fetzer, co-head coaches from 1921 to 1925, also led North Carolina to a SoCon title in 1922.

Brown is the leader in games won (113) during his 16 years with the program. Branch Bocock has the highest winning percentage of those who have coached more than one game, with .812. Gene McEver has the lowest winning percentage of those who have coached more than one game, with .167. Of the 35 head coaches who have led the Tar Heels, Snavely, Jim Tatum, and Brown have been inducted into the College Football Hall of Fame.

== Key ==
Key to symbols in coaches list
General		Overall		Conference		Postseason (Note: Although the first Rose Bowl Game was played in 1902, it has been continuously played since the 1916 game, and is recognized as the oldest bowl game by the NCAA. "—" indicates any season prior to 1916 when postseason games were not played.)	
No.	Order of coaches (Note: A running total of the number of head coaches, with coaches who served separate tenures being counted only once. Interim head coaches are represented with "Int" and are not counted in the running total. "—" indicates the team played but either without a coach or no coach is on record. "X" indicates an interim year without play.)	GC	Games coached	CW	Conference wins	PW	Postseason wins
DC	Division championships	OW	Overall wins	CL	Conference losses	PL	Postseason losses
CC	Conference championships	OL	Overall losses	CT	Conference ties	PT	Postseason ties
NC	National championships	OT	Overall ties (Note: Overtime rules in college football were introduced in 1996, making ties impossible in the period since.)	C%	Conference winning percentage		
†	Elected to the College Football Hall of Fame	O%	Overall winning percentage (Note: When computing the win–loss percentage, a tie counts as half a win and half a loss.)				

== Coaches ==
List of head football coaches showing season(s) coached, overall records, conference records, postseason records, championships and selected awards (Note: Statistics correct as of the end of the 2025 NCAA Division I FBS football season.)
No.	Name	Season(s) (Note: North Carolina did not field teams in 1890 after the faculty voted to discontinue the sport and in 1917 and 1918 due to World War I.)	GC	OW	OL	OT	O%	CW	CL	CT	C%	PW	PL	PT	DC (Note: Divisional champions advanced to the ACC Championship Game since the institution of divisional play beginning in the 2005 season through 2019, and again from 2021-2022. During that time, North Carolina competed as a member of the Coastal division.)	CC	NC	Awards
—	No coach	1888, 1889, 1891–1892	17	9	8	0	0.529	—	—	—	—	—	—	—	—	—	0	—
1	Hector Cowan	1889	2	1	1	0	0.500	—	—	—	—	—	—	—	—	—	0	—
X	William P. Graves	1891	0	0	0	0	.000	—	—	—	—	—	—	—	—	—	0	—
2	William J. "Yup" Cook	1893	7	3	4	0	0.429	—	—	—	—	—	—	—	—	—	0	—
3	Vernon K. Irvine	1894	9	6	3	0	0.666	—	—	—	—	—	—	—	—	0	0	—
4	Thomas Trenchard	1895, 1913–1915 (4)	37	26	9	2	0.729	—	—	—	—	—	—	—	—	0	0	—
5	Gordon Johnston	1896	8	3	4	1	0.437	—	—	—	—	—	—	—	—	0	0	—
6	William Ayres Reynolds	1897–1900 (4)	38	27	7	4	0.763	—	—	—	—	—	—	—	—	0	0	—
7	Charles O. Jenkins	1901	9	7	2	0	0.777	—	—	—	—	—	—	—	—	0	0	—
8	Herman Olcott	1902–1903 (2)	18	11	4	3	0.694	—	—	—	—	—	—	—	—	0	0	—
9	R. R. Brown	1904	9	5	2	2	0.666	—	—	—	—	—	—	—	—	0	0	—
10	William Warner	1905	8	4	3	1	0.562	—	—	—	—	—	—	—	—	0	0	—
11	Willis Kienholz	1906	7	1	4	2	0.285	—	—	—	—	—	—	—	—	0	0	—
12	Otis Lamson	1907	9	4	4	1	0.500	—	—	—	—	—	—	—	—	0	0	—
13	Edward L. Greene	1908	9	3	3	3	0.500	—	—	—	—	—	—	—	—	0	0	—
14	Arthur Brides	1909–1910 (2)	16	8	8	0	0.500	—	—	—	—	—	—	—	—	0	0	—
15	Branch Bocock	1911	8	6	1	1	0.812	—	—	—	—	—	—	—	—	0	0	—
16	C. W. Martin	1912	8	3	4	1	0.437	—	—	—	—	—	—	—	—	0	0	—
17	Thomas J. Campbell	1916, 1919 (2)	17	9	7	1	0.558	—	—	—	—	0	0	0	—	0	0	—
18	Myron Fuller	1920	8	2	6	0	0.250	—	—	—	—	0	0	0	—	0	0	—
19	Bob Fetzer & Bill Fetzer	1921–1925 (5)	46	30	12	4	0.695	13	5	2	0.700	0	0	0	—	1	0	—
20	Chuck Collins	1926–1933 (8)	78	38	31	9	0.544	24	22	8	0.518	0	0	0	—	0	0	—
21	Carl Snavely^{†}	1934–1935, 1945–1952 (10)	99	59	35	5	0.621	32	11	2	0.733	0	3	0	—	2	0	—
22	Raymond Wolf	1936–1941 (6)	58	38	17	3	0.681	23	9	1	0.712	0	0	0	—	0	0	—
23	Jim Tatum^{†}	1942, 1956–1958 (4)	39	19	17	3	0.525	13	10	2	0.560	0	0	0	—	0	0	—
24	Tom Young	1943	9	6	3	0	0.666	2	2	0	0.500	0	0	0	—	0	0	—
25	Gene McEver	1944	9	1	7	1	0.167	0	3	1	0.125	0	0	0	—	0	0	—
26	George T. Barclay	1953–1955 (3)	30	11	18	1	0.383	9	8	0	0.529	0	0	0	—	0	0	—
27	Jim Hickey	1959–1966 (8)	81	36	45	0	0.444	28	25	0	0.528	1	0	0	—	1	0	ACC Coach of the Year (1963) (Note: The ACC Coach of the Year is voted by Atlantic Coast Sports Media Association (ACSMA).)
28	Bill Dooley	1967–1977 (11)	124	69	53	2	0.560	38	22	2	0.629	1	5	0	—	3	0	ACC Coach of the Year (1971)
29	Dick Crum	1978–1987 (10)	116	72	41	3	0.633	38	23	1	0.620	4	2	0	—	1	0	ACC Coach of the Year (1980)
30	Mack Brown ^{†}	1988–1997, 2019–2024 (16)	193	113	79	1	0.588	67	58	1	0.536	4	6	0	—	0	0	ACC Coach of the Year (1996)
31	Carl Torbush	1997–2000 (4)	35	17	18	—	0.485	9	15	—	0.375	2	0	—	—	0	0	—
32	John Bunting	2001–2006 (6)	72	27	45	—	0.375	18	30	—	0.375	1	1	—	0	0	0	—
33	Butch Davis (Note: Davis' record at the conclusion of the 2008 season was eight wins and five losses (8–5, 4–4 ACC) and eight wins and five losses (8–5, 4–4 ACC) in 2009. In September 2011, North Carolina vacated their 16 victories due to sanctions stemming from academic misconduct and accepting illegal benefits discovered during the 2010 season for the 2008 and 2009 seasons. As the penalty to vacate victories does not result in a loss (or forfeiture) of the affected contests or award a victory to the opponent, the official NCAA record for these years are 0–5 and 0–5 respectively.)	2007–2010 (4)	35	12	23	—	0.342	7	17	—	0.291	1	2	—	0	0	0	—
Int	Everett Withers (Note: Everett Withers was named interim head coach for the 2011 season, following the termination of Butch Davis as head coach.)	2011	13	7	6	—	0.538	3	5	—	0.375	0	1	—	0	0	0	—
34	Larry Fedora	2012–2018 (7)	88	45	43	—	0.511	28	28	—	.500	1	4	—	2	0	0	—
Int	Freddie Kitchens (Note: Freddie Kitchens was named interim head coach for the Tar Heels' upcoming Fenway Bowl game following the termination of Mack Brown as head coach.)	2024	1	0	1	—	0.000	0	0	—	.000	0	1	—	0	0	0	—
35	Bill Belichick	2025–present	14	6	8	—	0.429	2	6	—	0.250	0	0	—	0	0	0	—
