= 1912 Johns Hopkins Blue Jays football team =

American college football season

1912 Johns Hopkins Blue Jays football
- Conference: South Atlantic Intercollegiate Athletic Association
- Record: 0–9 (0–1 SAIAA)
- Head coach: Max Rohde (1st season)
- Home stadium: Homewood Field

1912 South Atlantic Intercollegiate Athletic Association football standings
	Conf.					Overall
Team	W		L		T	W		L		T
Georgetown $	5	–	0	–	0	8	–	1	–	0
Washington and Lee	3	–	1	–	0	8	–	1	–	0
Virginia	1	–	1	–	0	6	–	3	–	0
VPI	1	–	2	–	0	5	–	4	–	0
Johns Hopkins	0	–	1	–	0	0	–	9	–	0
North Carolina A&M	0	–	2	–	0	4	–	3	–	0
North Carolina	0	–	4	–	0	3	–	4	–	1
$ – Conference champion

The 1912 Johns Hopkins Blue Jays football team was an American football team that represented Johns Hopkins University during the 1912 college football season as a member of the South Atlantic Intercollegiate Athletic Association. In their first year under head coach Max Rohde, the team compiled an overall record of 0–9.

== Schedule ==
Date	Opponent	Site	Result	Source
October 5	at Navy*	Worden Field; Annapolis, MD (rivalry)	L 3–7	
October 12	Maryland*	Homewood Field; Baltimore, MD	L 0–13	
October 19	Franklin & Marshall*	Homewood Field; Baltimore, MD	L 3–10	
October 26	at Swarthmore*	Whittier Field; Swarthmore, PA	L 6–40	
November 2	Stevens*	Homewood Field; Baltimore, MD	L 12–13	
November 9	Western Maryland*	Homewood Field; Baltimore, MD	L 6–13	
November 16	St. John's (MD)*	Homewood Field; Baltimore, MD	L 7–27	
November 23	Gallaudet*	Homewood Field; Baltimore, MD	L 14–16	
November 28	VMI*	Homewood Field; Baltimore, MD	L 0–21	
*Non-conference game
