= 1912 Washington and Lee Generals football team =

American college football season

1912 Washington and Lee Generals football
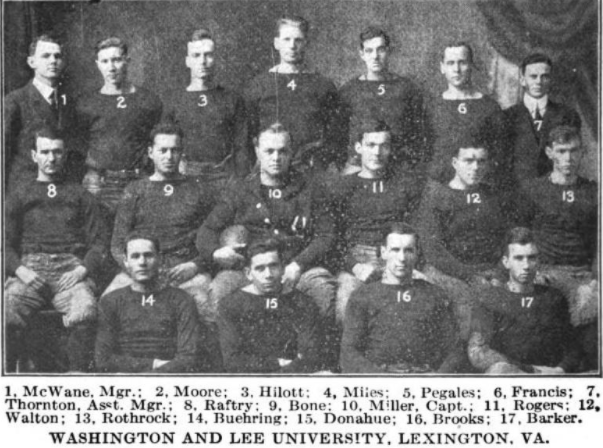
- Conference: South Atlantic Intercollegiate Athletic Association
- Record: 8–1 (3–1 SAIAA)
- Head coach: James Reilly (1st season)
- Captain: Buck Miles
- Home stadium: Wilson Field

1912 South Atlantic Intercollegiate Athletic Association football standings
	Conf.					Overall
Team	W		L		T	W		L		T
Georgetown $	5	–	0	–	0	8	–	1	–	0
Washington and Lee	3	–	1	–	0	8	–	1	–	0
Virginia	1	–	1	–	0	6	–	3	–	0
VPI	1	–	2	–	0	5	–	4	–	0
Johns Hopkins	0	–	1	–	0	0	–	9	–	0
North Carolina A&M	0	–	2	–	0	4	–	3	–	0
North Carolina	0	–	4	–	0	3	–	4	–	1
$ – Conference champion

The 1912 Washington and Lee Generals football team represented Washington and Lee University as a member of the South Atlantic Intercollegiate Athletic Association (SAIAA) during the 1912 college football season. Led by James Reilly in his first and only year as head coach, the Generals compiled an overall record of 8–1 with a mark of 3–1 in SAIAA play. Ted Shultz was the only freshman to make the varsity this season. Shultz and captain Buck Miles were the tackles, a duo which "scintillated."

== Schedule ==
Date	Time	Opponent	Site	Result	Attendance	Source
September 28		Medical College of Virginia*	Wilson Field; Lexington, VA	W 7–0		
October 5		Western Maryland*	Wilson Field; Lexington, VA	W 30–13		
October 12		at Georgetown	Georgetown Field; Washington, DC	L 0–20		
October 19		St. John's (MD)*	Wilson Field; Lexington, VA	W 24–14		
October 26		Wake Forest*	Wilson Field; Lexington, VA	W 20–0		
November 2		Davidson*	Wilson Field; Lexington, VA	W 54–0		
November 9	3:00 p.m.	vs. VPI	Fair Grounds; Roanoke, VA	W 20–6	3,500	
November 16	3:00 p.m.	vs. North Carolina	Cone Athletic Park (II); Greensboro, NC	W 31–0		
November 28	2:30 p.m.	vs. North Carolina A&M	Lafayette Field; Norfolk, VA	W 16–6		
*Non-conference game
