= 1979 Michigan Wolverines football team =

American college football season

1979 Michigan Wolverines football
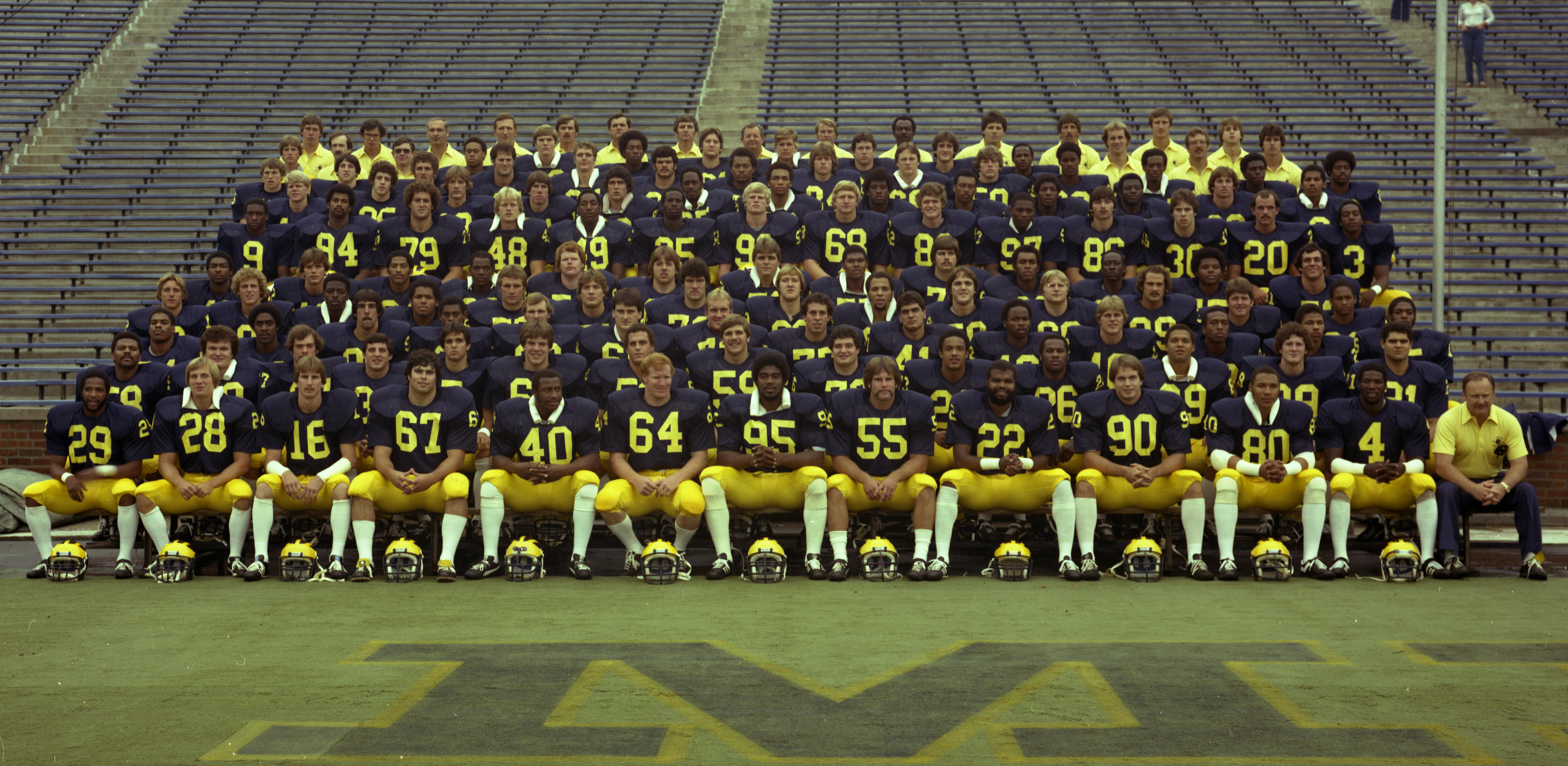
- Group photo of the team, 1979

Gator Bowl, L 15–17 vs. North Carolina
- Conference: Big Ten Conference

Ranking
- Coaches: No. 19
- AP: No. 18
- Record: 8–4 (6–2 Big Ten)
- Head coach: Bo Schembechler (11th season)
- Defensive coordinator: Bill McCartney (3rd season)
- MVP: Ron Simpkins
- Captains: John Arbeznik; Ron Simpkins
- Home stadium: Michigan Stadium

1979 Big Ten Conference football standings
	Conf.					Overall
Team	W		L		T	W		L		T
No. 4 Ohio State $	8	–	0	–	0	11	–	1	–	0
No. 10 Purdue	7	–	1	–	0	10	–	2	–	0
No. 18 Michigan	6	–	2	–	0	8	–	4	–	0
No. 19 Indiana	5	–	3	–	0	8	–	4	–	0
Iowa	4	–	4	–	0	5	–	6	–	0
Minnesota	3	–	5	–	1	4	–	6	–	1
Michigan State	3	–	5	–	0	5	–	6	–	0
Wisconsin	3	–	5	–	0	4	–	7	–	0
Illinois	1	–	6	–	1	2	–	8	–	1
Northwestern	0	–	9	–	0	1	–	10	–	0
$ – Conference champion; Rankings from AP Poll

The 1979 Michigan Wolverines football team was an American football team that represented the University of Michigan in the 1979 Big Ten Conference football season. In its 100th season of intercollegiate football, the 11th under head coach Bo Schembechler, Michigan compiled an 8–4 record (6–2 against conference opponents), lost to North Carolina in the 1979 Gator Bowl, was ranked No. 18 in the final AP Poll, and outscored opponents by a total of 312 to 151.

All four losses were by margins of two or three points with special teams errors and turnovers costly in each. In a two-point loss to Notre Dame, a pair of Michigan fumbles in the first half led to Irish field goals, and the Wolverines last-minute field goal attempt for the win was blocked. The Wolverines gave up four interceptions against Purdue and had a punt blocked and returned for the winning touchdown against Ohio State. In a two-point loss in the Gator Bowl, the Wolverines failed to convert on either point after touchdown and turned the ball over four times in the fourth quarter. And in a narrow victory over California, the Michigan kickers missed all five field goal attempts.

The team's statistical leaders included quarterback John Wangler with 1,431 passing yards, tailback Butch Woolfolk with 990 rushing yards and 78 points scored, and tight end Doug Marsh with 612 receiving yards. Linebacker Ron Simpkins was selected as both Michigan's most valuable player and a consensus first-team All-American. Defensive end Curtis Greer also received first-team All-America honors from several selectors.

== Schedule ==
Date	Opponent	Rank	Site	TV	Result	Attendance
September 8	Northwestern	No. 7	Michigan Stadium; Ann Arbor, MI (rivalry)		W 49–7	100,790
September 15	No. 9 Notre Dame*	No. 6	Michigan Stadium; Ann Arbor, MI (rivalry)	ABC	L 10–12	105,111
September 22	Kansas*	No. 11	Michigan Stadium; Ann Arbor, MI		W 28–7	103,698
September 29	at California*	No. 11	California Memorial Stadium; Berkeley, CA		W 14–10	57,000
October 6	at No. 16 Michigan State	No. 11	Spartan Stadium; East Lansing, MI (rivalry)	ABC	W 21–7	79,311
October 13	Minnesota	No. 11	Michigan Stadium; Ann Arbor, MI (Little Brown Jug)		W 31–21	104,677
October 20	at Illinois	No. 11	Memorial Stadium; Champaign, IL (rivalry)		W 27–7	43,370
October 27	Indiana^{†}	No. 10	Michigan Stadium; Ann Arbor, MI		W 27–21	104,832
November 3	Wisconsin	No. 10	Michigan Stadium; Ann Arbor, MI		W 54–0	104,952
November 10	at No. 14 Purdue	No. 10	Ross–Ade Stadium; West Lafayette, IN		L 21–24	69,829
November 17	No. 2 Ohio State	No. 13	Michigan Stadium; Ann Arbor, MI (The Game)	ABC	L 15–18	106,255
December 28	vs. North Carolina*	No. 14	Gator Bowl Stadium; Jacksonville, FL (Gator Bowl)	ABC	L 15–17	70,407
*Non-conference game; ^{†}Homecoming; Rankings from AP Poll released prior to the game

== Season summary ==
=== Preseason ===
The 1978 Michigan Wolverines football team compiled a 10–2 record and was ranked No. 5 in the final AP and UPI polls. Several key players from the 1978 team were lost to graduation or professional sports, including the Wolverines' 1978 starting backfield of Rick Leach, Harlan Huckleby, and Russell Davis, offensive lineman Jon Giesler (taken in the first round of the 1979 NFL draft), and linebackers Tom Seabron and Jerry Meter. Key players returning from the 1978 team included tailback Butch Woolfolk, offensive lineman John Arbeznik, defensive tackle Curtis Greer, linebacker Ron Simpkins, and defensive back Mike Jolly.

Michigan's 1979 recruiting class included quarterback Rich Hewlett (Plymouth, Michigan), running backs Jerald Ingram (Beaver, Pennsylvania) and Lawrence Ricks (Barberton, Ohio), receivers Anthony Carter (Riviera Beach, Florida) and Craig Dunaway (Upper St. Clair Township, Pennsylvania), linebackers Winfred Carraway (Detroit), Paul Girgash (Lakewood, Ohio), and Jim Herrmann (Dearborn Heights, Michigan), and defensive backs Keith Bostic (Ann Arbor, Michigan) and Jerry Burgei (Ottawa, Ohio).

In May 1979, defensive tackle Curtis Greer received the Meyer Morton Award as the player showing the greatest development and promise in spring practice. Defensive lineman Mike Trgovac received the Frederick C. Matthaei Award as the junior-to-be player displaying "leadership, drive and achievement on the athletic field and in the classroom", and wing back Tony Jackson received the John F. Maulbetsch Award as the best freshman player following spring practice "on the basis of desire, character, capacity for leadership and future success on and off the gridiron."

=== Northwestern ===
Week 1: Northwestern at Michigan

Team	1	2	3	4	Total
Northwestern	0	0	0	7	7
• Michigan	21	14	14	0	49

- Date: September 8
- Location: Ann Arbor, MI
- Game attendance: 100,790

Scoring summary
1		MICH	B. J. Dickey 2-yard run (Bryan Virgil kick)	MICH 7–0
1		MICH	Jim Betts 9-yard pass from Dickey (Virgil kick)	MICH 14–0
1	1:48	MICH	Anthony Carter 78-yard punt return (Virgil kick)	MICH 21–0
2		MICH	Dickey 35-yard run (Virgil kick)	MICH 28–0
2		MICH	Butch Woolfolk 1-yard run (Virgil kick)	MICH 35–0
3		MICH	Woolfolk 3-yard run (Virgil kick)	MICH 42–0
3		MICH	Carter 12-yard pass from John Wangler (Virgil kick)	MICH 49–0
4		NW	Dave Mishler 1-yard run (Poulos kick)	MICH 49–7

On September 8, 1979, Michigan opened its season with a 49–7 victory over Northwestern before a crowd of 100,790 at Michigan Stadium in Ann Arbor, Michigan. In his first game for Michigan, Anthony Carter had a 78-yard punt return for a touchdown and later scored again on a 12-yard touchdown pass from John Wangler. Michigan totaled 347 rushing yards and 140 passing yards. Stan Edwards rushed for 99 yards on eight carries, and quarterback B. J. Dickey passed for 68 yards and a touchdown and rushed for another 85 yards and a touchdown. Wangler took over as quarterback in the third quarter and completed five of six passes for 67 yards.

=== Notre Dame ===
Week 2: Notre Dame at Michigan

Team	1	2	3	4	Total
• Notre Dame	3	3	6	0	12
Michigan	3	7	0	0	10

- Date: September 15
- Location: Ann Arbor, MI
- Game attendance: 105,111
- Game weather: 65
- TV announcers (ABC): Keith Jackson, Frank Broyles

Scoring summary
1	7:31	MICH	Bryan Virgil 30-yard field goal	MICH 3-0
1		ND	Chuck Male 40-yard field goal	TIE 3-3
2	10:48	MICH	Stan Edwards 1-yard run (Virgil kick)	MICH 10-3
2	4:48	ND	Male 40-yard field goal	MICH 10-6
3		ND	Male 22-yard field goal	MICH 10-9
3		ND	Male 39-yard field goal	ND 12-10

On September 16, 1979, Michigan, ranked No. 5 in the AP Poll, lost to No. 7 Notre Dame, 12–10, before a crowd of 105,111 at Michigan Stadium.

In the first quarter, Michigan drove to the Notre Dame 15-yard line and took a 3–0 lead on a 30-yard field goal by Bryan Virgil. A short time later, Anthony Carter fumbled a punt return, and Notre Dame recovered the loose ball at Michigan's 36-yard line. Michigan's defense held at the 23-yard line, and Chuck Male then kicked a 40-yard field goal. At the end of the first and start of the second quarter, Michigan quarterback B. J. Dickey led a 13-play, 80-yard touchdown drive that consumed six minutes and 39 seconds. Dickey scrambled 16 yards to the one-yard line, and Stan Edwards then ran for the touchdown to put Michigan ahead, 10–3. Later in the second quarter, Dickey fumbled, and Notre Dame recovered the ball at Michigan's 39-yard line. Notre Dame advanced the ball to the 18-yard line, but a holding penalty and a sack pushed the Irish back, and Male kicked a 44-yard field goal to cut Michigan's lead to 10–6 at halftime.

Male kicked two additional field goals in the third quarter to put Notre Dame ahead, 12-10. After leading the offensive effectively in the first half, Dickey was unable to generate any offensive momentum in the third and fourth quarters. With two minutes remaining in the game, Michigan took over at its own 42-yard line. John Wangler replaced Dickey at quarterback and led the Wolverines to the Notre Dame 25-yard line. With six seconds remaining in the game, Michigan sent Bryan Virgil into the game to attempt a 42-yard field goal, but the kick was blocked by Bob Crable who climbed onto the back of Michigan center Mike Trgovac.

Michigan out-gained Notre Dame by 306 yards to 179 yards. Dickey rushed for 68 yards and completed nine of 18 passes for 106 yards. Virgil averaged only 29.7 yards on seven punts, including a five-yard punt in the fourth quarter. For Notre Dame, Rusty Lisch completed five of 10 passes for 65 yards, and Vagas Ferguson rushed for 118 yards on 35 carries.

=== Kansas ===
Week 3: Kansas at Michigan

Team	1	2	3	4	Total
Kansas	7	0	0	0	7
• Michigan	7	7	7	7	28

- Date: September 22
- Location: Ann Arbor, MI
- Game attendance: 103,698

Scoring summary
1		MICH	Stan Edwards 3-yard run (Ali Haji-Sheikh kick)	MICH 7-0
2	13:31	UK	Leroy Irvin 60-yard punt return (Hubach kick)	TIE 7-7
2		MICH	Lawrence Reid 1-yard run (Haji-Sheikh kick)	MICH 14-7
3		MICH	Edwards 2-yard run (Haji-Sheikh kick)	MICH 21-7
4		MICH	Doug Marsh 8-yard pass from John Wangler (Haji-Sheikh kick)	MICH 28-7

On September 22, 1979, Michigan defeated Kansas, 28–7, before a crowd of 103,698 at Michigan Stadium. Michigan out-gained Kansas, 467 yards to 104. Tailback Stan Edwards rushed for 106 yards on 17 carries, and John Wangler completed 12 of 18 passes for 195 yards and an interception. Ali Haji-Sheikh missed twice on 42-yard field goal attempts. Michigan's defense held Kansas to 79 passing yards, 25 rushing yards, and six first downs. Kansas' touchdown came on special teams, as Leroy Irvin returned a punt 60 yards.

=== California ===
Week 4: Michigan at California

Team	1	2	3	4	Total
• Michigan	0	0	14	0	14
California	7	3	0	0	10

- Date: September 29
- Location: Berkeley, CA
- Game attendance: 57,000

Scoring summary
1	CAL	John Tuggle 17-yard pass from Rich Campbell (Luckhurst kick)	CAL 7-0
2	CAL	Luckhurst 47-yard field goal	CAL 10-0
3	MICH	Stan Edwards 3-yard run (Bryan Virgil kick)	CAL 10-7
3	MICH	Lawrence Reid 3-yard run (Virgil kick)	MICH 14-10

On September 29, 1979, Michigan defeated California, 14–10, before a crowd of 57,000 at California Memorial Stadium in Berkeley, California. California took a 10-0 lead at halftime, but the Wolverines scored 14 unanswered points in the second half on touchdown runs by Stan Edwards and Lawrence Reid. Michigan out-gained California, 373 yards to 223 yards. Ali Haji-Sheikh and Bryan Virgil missed five field goal attempts.

With Michigan playing in California, athletic director Don Canham scheduled a Band Day football game at Michigan Stadium on September 29 between Slippery Rock and Shippensburg The game drew an NCAA Division II-record crowd of 61,143. Shippensburg beat Slippery Rock, 45–14.

=== Michigan State ===
Week 5: Michigan at Michigan State

Team	1	2	3	4	Total
• Michigan	7	0	7	7	21
Michigan State	0	0	7	0	7

- Date: Saturday, October 6
- Location: East Lansing, MI
- Game attendance: 79,311
- Referee: Gene Calhoun
- TV announcers (ABC): Keith Jackson, Ara Parseghian

Scoring summary
1	1:03	MICH	Butch Woolfolk 2-yard run (Bryan Virgil kick)	MICH 7-0
3	6:03	MSU	Derek Hughes 6-yard run (Morten Andersen kick)	TIE 7-7
3		MICH	Ralph Clayton 66-yard pass from B. J. Dickey (Virgil kick)	MICH 14-7
4		MICH	Anthony Carter 6-yard pass from Dickey (Virgil kick)	MICH 21-7

On October 6, 1979, Michigan, ranked No. 11 by the AP, defeated No. 16 Michigan State, 21–7, before a crowd of 79,311 at Spartan Stadium in East Lansing, Michigan.

In the first quarter, B. J. Dickey and Stan Edwards led a 14-play, 96-yard touchdown drive with Butch Woolfolk scoring on a two-yard touchdown run. In the second quarter, Michigan State's Jim Burroughs blocked a Bryan Virgil punt, and the Spartans took over at Michigan's 16-yard line. Mike Harden intercepted a pass to stop the Spartans. Later in the second quarter, Virgil's attempt at a 46-yard field goal fell short.

In the third quarter, Michigan State mounted a 55-yard touchdown drive with Derek Hughes scoring on a six-yard run. Michigan retook the lead on a 66-yard touchdown bomb from Dickey to Ralph Clayton. With two minutes remaining in the game, Michigan scored a third touchdown on a six-yard pass from Dickey to Anthony Carter.

Michigan out-gained Michigan State, 336 yards to 242 yards. For the Wolverines, Stan Edwards rushed for 139 yards on 24 carries, and Dickey completed eight of 13 passes for 137 yards and two touchdowns. For Michigan State, tailback Steve Smith rushed for 101 yards on 17 carries, and Bert Vaughn completed six of 18 for 86 yards and two interceptions.

In the week leading up to the game, Michigan coach Bo Schembechler drew criticism and comparisons to Woody Hayes for a physical encounter with a reporter for the university's student newspaper. With Michigan's kickers missing 14 of 15 field goal attempts to that point in the season, the reporter asked whether Schembechler would place greater emphasis on recruiting kickers. An angry Schembechler allegedly grabbed and threw the reporter's microphone, poked the reporter in the chest, grabbed him by the throat, and pushed him backwards.

=== Minnesota ===
Week 6: Minnesota at Michigan

Team	1	2	3	4	Total
Minnesota	0	7	7	7	21
• Michigan	10	14	0	7	31

- Date: October 13
- Location: Ann Arbor, MI
- Game attendance: 104,677

Scoring summary
1	MICH	Bryan Virgil 27-yard field goal	MICH 3-0
1	MICH	Butch Woolfolk 58-yard run (Virgil kick)	MICH 10-0
2	MINN	Marion Barber 1-yard run (Paul Rogind kick)	MICH 10-7
2	MICH	Lawrence Reid 1-yard run (Virgil kick)	MICH 17-7
2	MICH	Reid 1-yard pass from John Wangler (Virgil kick)	MICH 24-7
3	MINN	Elmer Bailey 10-yard pass from Mark Carlson (Rogind kick)	MICH 24-14
4	MINN	Glenn Lewis 11-yard run (Rogind kick)	MICH 24-21
4	MICH	Woolfolk 41-yard run (Virgil kick)	MICH 31-24

On October 13, 1979, Michigan defeated Minnesota, 31-21, before a crowd of 104,677 at Michigan Stadium.

Michigan took a 24-7 lead at halftime on a 27-yard field goal, a 54-yard touchdown run by tailback Butch Woolfolk, a one-yard touchdown run by fullback Lawrence Reid, and a one-yard touchdown pass from John Wangler to Reid. In the second half, Minnesota narrowed the lead to 24-21 on a 10-yard touchdown pass from Mark Carlson to Elmer Bailey and an 11-yard touchdown run by Glenn Lewis. In the fourth quarter, Woolfolk extended Michigan's lead on a 41-yard touchdown run.

Michigan totaled 537 yards of total offense, including 456 rushing yards. Woolfolk led the way with 194 yards and two touchdowns on 24 carries, and Reid added 179 yards and a touchdown on 17 carries. Minnesota quarterback Mark Carlson threw the ball a record 51 times with 27 completions for 339 yards and three interceptions (two by Mike Jolly). Michigan held Minnesota to 29 net rushing yards and limited Marion Barber to 38 rushing yards.

=== Illinois ===
Week 7: Michigan at Illinois

Team	1	2	3	4	Total
• Michigan	0	0	14	13	27
Illinois	0	0	0	7	7

- Date: October 20
- Location: Champaign, IL
- Game attendance: 43,370

Scoring summary
3	MICH	Butch Woolfolk 1-yard run (Bryan Virgil kick)	MICH 7-0
3	MICH	Anthony Carter 20-yard pass from John Wangler (Vrigil Kick)	MICH 14-0
4	MICH	Woolfolk 30-yard run (Virgil kick)	MICH 21-0
4	MICH	Woolfolk 1-yard run (Virgil kick)	MICH 28-0
4	UI	Mike Murphy 10-yard pass from Tim McAvoy (Kirk Bostrom kick)	MICH 28-7

On October 20, 1979, Michigan defeated Gary Moeller's Illinois Fighting Illini before a crowd of 43,370 at Memorial Stadium at Champaign, Illinois. After a scoreless first half, Mike Jolly intercepted an Illinois pass at the Illini's 36-yard line, and Michigan drove for the game's first touchdown, a one-yard run by Butch Woolfolk. John Wangler also threw a 20-yard touchdown pass to Anthony Carter. Stan Edwards rushed for 81 yards on 22 carries, and Woolfolk totaled 78 yards and three touchdowns on 18 carries. Michigan's defense limited the Illini to 58 rushing yards and 26 passing yards. The game was played in 35-mile-per-hour winds. After the game, coach Bo Schembechler said: "It was definitely a wind game. . . . It was like a wind tunnel out there."

=== Indiana ===
Week 8: Indiana at Michigan

Team	1	2	3	4	Total
Indiana	0	14	0	7	21
• Michigan	7	0	14	6	27

- Date: October 27
- Location: Ann Arbor, MI
- Game attendance: 104,832

Scoring summary
1		MICH	Lawrence Reid 3-yard run (Bryan Virgil kick)	MICH 7-0
2		IND	Dave Harangody 3-yard pass from Tim Clifford (Kellogg kick)	TIE 7-7
2		IND	Lonnie Johnson 14-yard run (Kellogg kick)	IND 14-7
3		MICH	Reid 50-yard run (Virgil kick)	TIE 14-14
3		MICH	Butch Woolfolk 2-yard run (Virgil kick)	MICH 21-14
4	0:55	IND	Dave Harangody 3-yard pass from Tim Clifford (Kellogg kick)	TIE 21-21
4	0:00	MICH	Anthony Carter 45-yard pass from John Wangler	MICH 27-21

On October 27, 1979, Michigan defeated Indiana, 27-21, before a crowd of 104,832 at Michigan Stadium.

In the first quarter, linebacker Mike Lemirande recovered an Indiana fumble at the Hoosiers' 26-yard line, and Michigan capitalized on the turnover as B. J. Dickey ran 19 yards to the three-yard line, and Lawrence Reid then ran for the touchdown. In the second quarter, Indiana executed a 98-yard touchdown drive and later took a 14-7 lead with one minute left in the half.

Michigan opened the second half with a 50-yard touchdown run by Lawrence Reid and then retook the lead on its next drive, Butch Woolfolk scoring on a two-yard run.

Late in the fourth quarter, Indiana quarterback Tim Clifford led the Hoosiers on a 79-yard touchdown drive, including a 54-yard pass to the Michigan two-yard line. Indiana tied the game with 55 seconds remaining on a short pass from Clifford to Dave Harangody.

With 51 seconds remaining, Michigan began at its own 22-yard line. Lawrence Reid caught a pass and intentionally tossed the ball out of bounds (into the hands of Indiana coach Lee Corso) at the Indiana 45-yard line with six seconds remaining. Wangler then passed to Anthony Carter at the 23-yard line, and Carter evaded two tacklers at the 20-yard line and another inside the five-yard line, crossing the goal line for the winning touchdown. The play was made famous by Bob Ufer's emotional radio narration as the play unfolded:

"Under center is Wangler at the 45, he goes back. He's looking for a receiver. He throws downfield to Carter. Carter has it. [unintellibible screaming] Carter scores. . . . I have never seen anything like this in all my 40 years of covering Michigan football. . . Johnny Wangler to Anthony Carter will be heard until another 100 years of Michigan football is played! . . . Meeeshigan wins, 27 to 21. They aren't even going to try the extra point. Who cares? Who gives a damn?"

The game-winning pass from Wangler to Carter has been called "the greatest single play in the 100-year history of Michigan football."

The Wolverines out-gained the Hoosiers by 489 yards to 393 yards. Wangler completed 10 of 14 passes for 163 yards while Butch Woolfolk and Lawrence Reid rushed for 127 and 99 yards respectively. For Indiana, Tim Clifford completed 12 of 26 passes for 232 yards, and Mike Harkrader rushed for 80 yards on 23 carries.

=== Wisconsin ===
Week 9: Wisconsin at Michigan

Team	1	2	3	4	Total
Wisconsin	0	0	0	0	0
• Michigan	3	14	23	14	54

- Date: November 3
- Location: Ann Arbor, MI
- Game attendance: 104,952

Scoring summary
Q1	MICH	Bryan Virgil 27-yard field goal	MICH 3–0
Q2	MICH	Butch Woolfolk 1-yard run (Virgil kick)	MICH 10–0
Q2	MICH	Woolfolk 30-yard run (Virgil kick)	MICH 17–0
Q3	MICH	Doug Marsh 71-yard pass from Wangler (Virgil kick)	MICH 24–0
Q3	MICH	Safety	MICH 26–0
Q3	MICH	Lawrence Reid 1-yard run (Virgil kick)	MICH 33–0
Q3	MICH	Woolfolk 92-yard run (Virgil kick)	MICH 40–0
Q4	MICH	Lawrence Ricks 4-yard run (Virgil kick)	MICH 47–0
Q4	MICH	Jerald Ingram 5-yard run (Virgil kick)	MICH 54–0

On November 3, 1979, Michigan defeated Wisconsin, 54–0, before a crowd of 104,952 at Michigan Stadium. John Wangler started at quarterback in place of B. J. Dickey who was recovering from a shoulder injury. Wangler completed 10 of 13 passes for 219 yards, including a 71-yard touchdown pass to Doug Marsh. Butch Woolfolk rushed for 190 yards and three touchdowns on 19 carries. In the third quarter, Woolfolk had a 92-yard touchdown run that broke the former Michigan record of 86 yards set by Tom Harmon.

=== Purdue ===
Week 10: Michigan at Purdue

Team	1	2	3	4	Total
Michigan	0	0	6	15	21
• Purdue	7	0	7	10	24

- Date: November 10
- Location: West Lafayette, IN
- Game attendance: 69,829

Scoring summary
1		PUR	Ben McCall 2-yard run (Selbel kick)	PUR 7-0
3		PUR	Mark Herrmann 1-yard run (Selbel kick)	PUR 14-0
3		MICH	Doug Marsh 6-yard pass from John Wangler (kick failed)	PUR 14-6
4		PUR	Selbel 29-yard field goal	PUR 17-6
4		PUR	McCall 9-yard run (Selbel kick)	PUR 24-6
4		MICH	Roosevelt Smith 1-yard run (run failed)	PUR 24-12
4	3:41	MICH	Butch Woolfolk 2-yard run (Virgil kick)	PUR 24-19
4		MICH	Safety, Hermann tackled in end zone	PUR 24-21

On November 10, 1979, Michigan lost to Purdue, 21–24, before a crowd of 69,829 at Ross–Ade Stadium in West Lafayette, Indiana. Michigan trailed by 24-6 with 10 minutes remaining and scored 15 points in a comeback effort that fell short. Michigan threw four interceptions. After the game, coach Bo Schembechler praised his team's effort in the comeback attempt: "Our players showed a lot of character, as bad as we looked. It is as good a group of kids as I've ever had. They won't lay down and die."

=== Ohio State ===
Week 11: Ohio State at Michigan

Team	1	2	3	4	Total
• Ohio State	0	6	6	6	18
Michigan	0	7	8	0	15

- Date: November 17
- Location: Ann Arbor, MI
- Game attendance: 106,255
- Game weather: Sunny • 50 °F (10 °C) • Wind 10–15 mph (16–24 km/h) SW
- TV announcers (ABC): Keith Jackson, Ara Parseghian

Scoring summary
2	3:48	OHIO	Vlade Janakievski 23-yard field goal	OHIO 3–0
2	1:30	MICH	Anthony Carter 59-yard pass from John Wangler (Bryan Virgil kick)	MICH 7–3
2	0:08	OHIO	Janakievski 25-yard field goal	MICH 7–6
3	7:19	OHIO	Hunter 18-yard pass from Art Schlichter (pass failed)	OHIO 12–7
3	3:58	MICH	Roosevelt Smith 1-yard run (Smith run)	MICH 15–12
4	11:21	OHIO	Virgil punt blocked, returned 18 yards for touchdown by Todd Bell (Janakievski kick failed)	OHIO 18–15

On November 17, 1979, Michigan, ranked No. 13 by the AP, lost to No. 2 Ohio State, 18–15, at Michigan Stadium. The game attracted a crowd of 106,255, an NCAA record for a regular season game. It was the first Michigan–Ohio State game for the Buckeyes' new head coach Earle Bruce.

On Ohio State's second possession, Mike Harden intercepted an Art Schlichter pass and returned it to the Ohio State 32-yard line. Michigan drove to the one-yard line, but Michigan quarterback Rich Hewlett was dropped for a loss on fourth-and one. At the end of the first quarter, Ray Ellis intercepted a Rich Hewlett pass and returned it to the Michigan 38-yard line. Michigan's defense held, and Ohio State was forced to punt. On Michigan's next possession, the Wolverines called a fake punt on fourth down from their own 37-yard line, but punter Bryan Virgil threw an incomplete pass. Ohio State took over with good field position but was again forced to punt.

Later in the second quarter, Ohio State's run game gained momentum and the Buckeyes drove to the six-yard line. At that point, the Michigan defense held, and Vlade Janakievski kicked a 23-yard field goal with 3:48 to go in the half. On Michigan's next possession following the Janakievski field goal, John Wangler replaced Hewlett at quarterback. Wangler hit Anthony Carter on a 59-yard touchdown pass to put Michigan ahead, 7-3, with 1:30 left in the half. After Michigan's touchdown, Schlichter passed the Buckeyes quickly down the field, and Janakievski kicked a 25-yard field goal with eight seconds left in the half. Michigan led, 7-6, at halftime.

On their first possession of the third quarter, Ohio State drove from its own 49-yard line to the one-yard line, but penalties pushed the Buckeyes back to the 18-yard line. Schlichter then threw an 18-yard touchdown pass to Hunter, but his throw for a two-point conversion fell incomplete. Ohio State led, 12-7. On Michigan's next possession, Wangler connected with Carter for a 66-yard pass at the Ohio State 19-yard line. Roosevelt Smith then scored on a one-yard run, and Smith ran again for a successful two-point conversion. Michigan led, 15-12.

Late in the third quarter, Ohio State drove deep into Michigan territory, James Gayle fumbled at its own nine-yard line, with Mike Jolly recovering for Michigan. In the fourth quarter, Ohio State blocked a Bryan Virgil punt, and Todd Bell returned it 18 yards for the game-winning touchdown. Janakievski's kick failed, and Ohio State led, 18-15.

The ABC broadcast crew named Schlichter and Michigan middle guard Mike Trgovac as the Chevrolet Most Valuable Players of the game. Schlichter completed 12 of 22 passes for 196 yards, a touchdown, and an interception. Trgovac had 11 solo tackles and five assists.

For Ohio State, James Gayle rushed for 72 yards on nine carries, and Doug Donley caught three passes for 87 yards. For Michigan, Wangler completed four of nine passes for 133 yards, a touchdown, and an interception with three seconds remaining in the game. Butch Woolfolk rushed for 68 yards on 18 carries, and Anthony Carter caught two passes for 125 yards and a touchdown.

=== Gator Bowl ===
Gator Bowl: Michigan vs. North Carolina

Team	1	2	3	4	Total
Michigan	0	9	0	6	15
• North Carolina	0	7	7	3	17

- Date: December 28
- Location: Jacksonville, FL
- Game attendance: 70,407
- Referee: Clint Fuller (SWC)
- TV announcers (ABC): Keith Jackson, Frank Broyles and Dave Diles

Scoring summary
2		MICH	Bryan Virgil, 20-yard field goal	MICH 3-0
2	9:47	MICH	Anthony Carter, 53-yard pass from John Wangler (kick failed)	MICH 9-0
2	4:46	UNC	Doug Paschal, 1-yard run (Jeff Hayes kick)	MICH 9-7
3	2:19	UNC	Phil Farris 12-yard pass from Matt Kupec (Hayes kick)	UNC 14-9
4	7:31	UNC	Hayes 32-yard field goal	UNC 17-9
4	1:29	MICH	Carter 30-yard pass from B. J. Dickey (Dickey pass failed)	UNC 17-15

On December 28, 1979, Michigan lost to North Carolina, 17–15, before a crowd of 70,407 in the 1979 Gator Bowl in Jacksonville, Florida.

Neither team scored in the first quarter. On North Carolina's first two drives, quarterback Matt Kupec led the Tar Heels deep into Michigan territory. On both occasions, North Carolina missed on field goal attempts into the wind. On Michigan's first play from scrimmage, John Wangler threw a bomb to Anthony Carter that was good for a 47-yard gain. A sack pushed Michigan back, and the Wolverines were forced to punt.

Late in the first quarter, Amos Lawrence fumbled, and Mike Harden recovered the loose ball at Michigan's 38-yard line. Wangler led the Wolverines downfield, the big gain coming on a 50-yard pass to Ralph Clayton at the North Carolina six-yard line. North Carolina's defense held, and Michigan settled for a 20-yard field goal by Bryan Virgil. On Michigan's next possession, Wangler threw a pass to Carter who ran untouched into the end zone for a 53-yard touchdown. Virgil's extra point kick failed, and Michigan led, 9–0.

On Michigan's next possession after the Carter touchdown, Wangler was sacked by Lawrence Taylor at the Michigan three-yard line. Wangler sustained torn ligaments in his right knee and did not return to the game. Michigan was forced to punt from deep in its own territory, and North Carolina took over at Michigan's 42-yard line. Kupec again led the Tar Heels downfield, and Doug Paschal scored on a one-yard run to narrow Michigan's lead to 9–7 at halftime.

In the third quarter, North Carolina mounted a 97-yard, six-minute drive and took a 14–9 lead on a 12-yard touchdown pass from Kupec to Phil Farris. North Carolina extended its lead to 17–9 on a 32-yard field goal in the fourth quarter.

In the fourth quarter, Michigan moved downfield on a 42-yard pass interference penalty on a reverse play with Anthony Carter attempting a long pass downfield to Ralph Clayton. On the next play from scrimmage, B. J. Dickey fumbled on a pitch-out, and North Carolina recovered the loose ball at the Tar Heel 35-yard line. Dickey's fumble was the fourth Michigan turnover (two interceptions and two fumbles) of the fourth quarter. Finally, with 1:28 left in the game, Dickey threw a 30-yard touchdown pass to Carter. Michigan attempted a two-point conversion for the tie, but Dickey's pass to Carter was broken up, and an onside kick attempt failed.

In the first quarter-and-a-half of play, Wangler had completed six of eight passes for 203 yards. With Dickey at quarterback for the last two-and-a-half quarters, Michigan had difficulty moving the ball until its final drive. After the game, Schembechler said, "Wangler hit some big plays. Losing him was one of those things. A good football team has to overcome that." North Carolina quarterback Matt Kupec and running back Amos Lawrence tied for the outstanding player of the game award. Kupec completed 19 of 28 passes for 161 yards, and Lawrence rushed for 110 yards on 23 carries and caught five passes for 30 yards.

=== Award season ===
Two Michigan players received first-team honors on the 1979 All-America college football team:

- Linebacker Ron Simpkins was a consensus All-American, receiving first-team honors from the Associated Press (AP), Football Writers Association of America (FWAA), United Press International (UPI), and Walter Camp Football Foundation.
- Defensive end Curtis Greer received first-team honors from the American Football Coaches Association, FWAA, and Newspaper Enterprise Association.

Seven Michigan players received first-team honors from the AP or UP on the 1979 All-Big Ten Conference football team: linebacker Ron Simpkins (AP-1, UPI-1); defensive end Curtis Greer (AP-1, UPI-1); running back Butch Woolfolk (AP-1, UPI-1); defensive back Mike Jolly (AP-1, UPI-1); offensive guard John Arbeznik (UPI-1); and defensive lineman Mike Trgovac (UPI-1).

Linebacker Ron Simpkins receive the team's most valuable player award, and Dan Murry received the Arthur Robinson Scholarship Award.

== Personnel ==
=== Full roster ===
1979 Michigan Wolverines football team roster
Players
Coaches
Offense

Pos.	#	Name	Class
G	64	John Arbeznik	Sr
G	65	Kurt Becker	Jr
TE	82	Norm Betts	So
RB	13	Keith Bostic	Fr
RB	33	Mike Cade	Fr
WR	1	Anthony Carter	Fr
TE	85	Chuck Christian	Jr
WB	22	Ralph Clayton	Sr
QB	10	B. J. Dickey	Jr
TE	88	Craig Dunaway	Fr
TB	32	Stanley Edwards	Jr
WR	18	Rodney Feaster	Jr
C	51	Jeff Felten	So
C	64	Tim Garrity	So
QB	19	Rich Hewlett	Fr
FB	35	Jerald Ingram	Fr
WB	21	Tony Jackson	So
OT	76	Mike Leoni	Sr
TB	34	Tony Leoni	Sr
C	59	George Lilja	Sr
TE	80	Doug Marsh	Sr
WR	30	Alan Mitchell	Jr
OT	72	Ed Muransky	So
TE	12	Jim Paciorek	So
OT	76	Bubba Paris	So
G	70	Gary Quinn	Sr
FB	23	Lawrence Reid	Sr
TB	46	Lawrence Ricks	Fr
FB	26	Roosevelt Smith	Sr
OT	68	Rich Strenger	So
QB	5	John Wangler	Sr
TB	24	Butch Woolfolk	So

Defense

Pos.	#	Name	Class
DB	3	Marion Body	So
CB	28	Mark Braman	Sr
LB	41	Andy Cannavino	Jr
DB	9	Brian Carpenter	So
LB	63	Winfred Carraway	Fr
DT	92	Cedric Coles	So
DB	29	Gerald Diggs	Sr
LB	50	Paul Girgash	Fr
DT	90	Chris Godfrey	Sr
DT	95	Curtis Greer	Sr
DB	4	Mike Harden	Sr
DB	31	Stuart Harris	Jr
LB	15	Irvin Johnson	Sr
CB	16	Mike Jolly	Sr
DT	55	Dale Keitz	Sr
LB	99	Tom Keller	Sr
LB	93	Mike Lemirande	So
MG	54	Thomas Moss	Sr
LB	83	Ben Needham	Jr
DT	96	Dave Nicolau	Jr
LB	53	Mel Owens	Sr
LB	89	David Payne	Sr
DB	43	Jeff Reeves	So
LB	40	Ron Simpkins	Sr
LB	99	Robert Tompson	So
MG	77	Mike Trgovac	Jr
DT	62	Gary Weber	Sr

Special teams

Pos.	#	Name	Class
K		Ali Haji-Sheikh	Fr
K, P	2	Bryan Virgil	Sr

Head coach

- Bo Schembechler

Coordinators/assistant coaches

Legend

- (C) Team captain
- (S) Suspended
- (I) Ineligible
- Injured
- Redshirt

Roster

=== Letter winners, offense ===
- John Arbeznik, offensive guard, senior, University Heights, Ohio - started all 12 games at left offensive guard
- Kurt Becker, offensive guard, junior, Aurora, Illinois - started all 12 games at right offensive guard
- Norm Betts, tight end, sophomore, Midland, Michigan
- Keith Bostic, running back, freshman, Ann Arbor, Michigan
- Mike Cade, running back, freshman, Elroy, Arizona
- Anthony Carter, wide receiver, freshman, Riviera Beach, Florida - started 2 games at wide receiver
- Chuck Christian, tight end, junior, Detroit, Michigan
- Ralph Clayton, wing back, senior, Detroit, Michigan - started all 12 games at wing back
- B. J. Dickey, quarterback, junior, Ottawa, Ohio - started 7 games at quarterback
- Craig Dunaway, tight end, freshman, Pittsburgh, Pennsylvania
- Stanley Edwards, tailback, junior, Detroit, Michigan - started 7 games at tailback
- Rodney Feaster, wide receiver, junior, Flint, Michigan
- Jeff Felten, center, sophomore, Centreville, Michigan
- Tim Garrity, center, sophomore, Grafton, Wisconsin
- Ali Haji-Sheikh, place-kicker, freshman, Arlington, Texas
- Rich Hewlett, quarterback, freshman, Plymouth, Michigan - started 1 game at quarterback
- Jerald Ingram, fullback, freshman, Beaver, Pennsylvania
- Tony Jackson, wing back, sophomore, Cleveland, Ohio
- Mike Leoni, offensive tackle, senior, Flint, Michigan - started 4 games at left offensive tackle
- Tony Leoni, tailback, senior, Flint, Michigan
- George Lilja, center, senior, Palos Park, Illinois - started all 12 games at center
- Doug Marsh, tight end, senior, Akron, Ohio
- Alan Mitchell, wide receiver, junior, Detroit, Michigan - started 10 games at wide receiver
- Ed Muransky, offensive tackle, sophomore, Youngstown, Ohio - started all 12 games at right offensive tackle
- Jim Paciorek, tight end, sophomore, Orchard Lake, Michigan
- Bubba Paris, offensive tackle, sophomore, Louisville, Kentucky - started 8 games at left offensive tackle
- Gary Quinn, offensive guard, senior, Quincy, Massachusetts
- Lawrence P. Reid, fullback, senior, Philadelphia, Pennsylvania - started 10 games at fullback
- Lawrence Ricks, tailback, freshman, Barberton, Ohio
- Roosevelt Smith, tailback, senior, Detroit, Michigan - started 2 games at fullback
- Rich Strenger, offensive tackle, sophomore, Grafton, Wisconsin
- Bryan Virgil, place-kicker, senior, Buchanan, Michigan
- John Wangler, quarterback, senior, Royal Oak, Michigan - started 4 games at quarterback
- Butch Woolfolk, tailback, sophomore, Westfield, New Jersey - started 5 games at tailback

=== Letter winners, defense ===
- Marion Body, defensive back, sophomore, Detroit, Michigan
- Mark Braman, defensive back, senior, Midland, Michigan - started all 12 games at strong-side cornerback
- Andy Cannavino, inside linebacker, junior, Cleveland, Ohio - started all 12 games at inside linebacker
- Brian Carpenter, defensive back, sophomore, Flint, Michigan
- Winfred Carraway, linebacker, freshman, Detroit, Michigan
- Cedric Coles, defensive tackle, sophomore, Detroit, Michigan
- Gerald Diggs, defensive back, senior, Chicago, Illinois
- Paul Girgash, linebacker, freshman, Lakewood, Ohio
- Chris Godfrey, defensive tackle, senior, Lathrup Village, Michigan
- Curtis Greer, defensive tackle, senior, Detroit, Michigan - started all 12 games at defensive tackle
- Mike Harden, defensive back, senior, Detroit, Michigan - started all 12 games at safety
- Stuart Harris, defensive back, junior, Chagrin Falls, Ohio - started 9 games at wolfman
- Irvin Johnson, inside linebacker, senior, Warren, Ohio
- Mike Jolly, defensive back, senior, Melvindale, Michigan - started all 12 games at weak-side cornerback
- Dale Keitz, defensive tackle, senior, Columbus, Ohio - started 1 game at middle guard
- Tom Keller, outside linebacker, senior, Grand Rapids, Michigan
- Mike Lemirande, outside linebacker, sophomore, Grafton, Wisconsin
- Thomas E. Moss, middle guard, senior, Detroit, Michigan
- Ben Needham, outside linebacker, junior, Groveport, Ohio - started 11 games at outside linebacker
- Dave Nicolau, defensive tackle, junior, Elk Grove Village, Illinois
- Mel Owens, outside linebacker, senior, DeKalb, Illinois - started all 12 games at outside linebacker
- David Payne, inside linebacker, senior, Detroit, Michigan
- Jeff Reeves, defensive back, sophomore, Columbus, Ohio - started 3 games at wolfman
- Ron Simpkins, inside linebacker, senior, Detroit, Michigan - started all 12 games at inside linebacker
- Robert Thompson, outside linebacker, sophomore, Blue Island, Illinois - started 1 game at outside linebacker
- Mike Trgovac, middle guard, junior, Austintown, Ohio - started 11 games at middle guard
- Gary Weber, defensive tackle, senior, Matawan, New Jersey

=== Professional football ===
Twenty-five (25) members of the 1979 Michigan football team went on to play professional football. They are:

- Kurt Becker (Chicago Bears, 1982–88, 1990, Los Angeles Rams, 1989)
- Marion Body (Michigan Panthers, 1983)
- Keith Bostic (Houston Oilers, 1983–88, Cleveland Browns, 1990)
- Andy Cannavino (Michigan Panthers, 1983, Chicago Blitz, 1984)
- Brian Carpenter (New York Giants, 1982, Washington Redskins, 1983-84, Buffalo Bills, 1984)
- Anthony Carter (Michigan Panthers, 1983–84, Oakland Invaders, 1985, Minnesota Vikings, 1985–93, Detroit Lions, 1994-95)
- Ralph Clayton (St. Louis Cardinals, 1981)
- Craig Dunaway (Pittsburgh Steelers, 1983)
- Stanley Edwards (Houston Oilers, 1982–86, Detroit Lions, 1987)
- Paul Girgash (Michigan Panthers, 1984)
- Chris Godfrey (New York Jets, 1980, New York Giants, 1984-87, Seattle Seahawks, 1988)
- Curtis Greer (St. Louis Cardinals, 1980–87)
- Ali Haji-Sheikh (New York Giants, 1983–85, Atlanta Falcons, 1986, Washington Redskins, 1987)
- Mike Harden (Denver Broncos, 1980–88, Los Angeles Raiders, 1989–90)
- Mike Jolly (Green Bay Packers, 1980–83)
- George Lilja (Los Angeles Rams, 1982, New York Jets, 1983–84, Cleveland Browns, 1984–86, Dallas Cowboys, 1987)
- Doug Marsh (St. Louis Cardinals, 1980–86)
- Ed Muransky (Los Angeles Raiders, 1982–84, Orlando Renegades, 1985)
- Mel Owens (Los Angeles Rams, 1981–89)
- Bubba Paris (San Francisco 49ers, 1983–90, Indianapolis Colts, 1991, Detroit Lions 1991)
- Lawrence Ricks (Kansas City Chiefs, 1983–84)
- Ron Simpkins (Cincinnati Bengals, 1980–86, Green Bay Packers, 1988)
- Rich Strenger (Detroit Lions, 1983–87)
- Robert Thompson (Tampa Bay Buccaneers, 1983–84, Detroit Lions, 1987)
- Butch Woolfolk (New York Giants, 1982–84, Houston Oilers, 1985-86, Detroit Lions, 1987–88)

=== Coaching staff ===
- Head coach: Bo Schembechler
- Assistant coaches:

- Bill McCartney - defensive coordinator and inside linebackers coach (joined Schembechler's staff in 1974, became defensive coordinator in 1977)
- Jack Harbaugh - defensive backs coach (joined Schembechler's staff in 1973)
- Dennis Brown - outside linebackers coach (joined Schembechler's staff in 1972)
- Milan Vooletich - defensive line coach (joined Schembechler's staff in 1978)
- Don Nehlen - offensive backfield coach (joined Schembechler's staff in 1977)
- Tirrel Burton - offensive ends coach (joined Schembechler's staff in 1970)
- Jerry Hanlon - offensive line coach (held same position since 1969)
- Paul Schudel - offensive interior line coach (joined Schembechler's staff in 1975)
- Bob Thornbladh - special assistant (joined Schembechler's staff in 1975)
- Mike Gittleson - strength coach (joined Schembechler's staff in 1979)

- Trainer: Russ Miller
- Manager: Thomas J. Anderson

== Statistics ==
=== Rushing ===
Player	Att	Net Yards	Yds/Att	TD
Butch Woolfolk	191	990	5.2	13
Stan Edwards	136	633	4.7	4
Lawrence Reid	103	555	5.4	6
B. J. Dickey	65	284	4.4	2
Roosevelt Smith	33	147	4.5	2
Lawrence Ricks	22	100	4.5	1

=== Passing ===
Player	Att	Comp	Int	Comp %	Yds	Yds/Comp	TD
John Wangler	130	78	7	60.0	1,431	18.3	8
B. J. Dickey	91	48	6	52.7	586	12.2	5

=== Receiving ===
Player	Recp	Yds	Yds/Recp	TD
Doug Marsh	33	612	18.5	3
Anthony Carter	17	462	27.2	7
Ralph Clayton	16	357	22.3	1
Lawrence Reid	12	132	11.0	1
Butch Woolfolk	18	128	7.1	0
Norm Betts	9	104	11.6	1
