= 1912 VPI Gobblers football team =

American college football season

1912 VPI Gobblers football
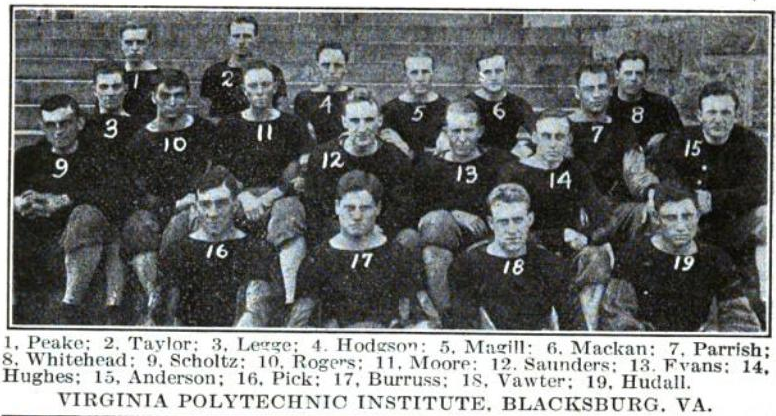
- Conference: South Atlantic Intercollegiate Athletic Association
- Record: 5–4 (1–2 SAIAA)
- Head coach: Branch Bocock (3rd season)
- Captain: William Henry Burruss
- Home stadium: Miles Field

1912 South Atlantic Intercollegiate Athletic Association football standings
	Conf.					Overall
Team	W		L		T	W		L		T
Georgetown $	5	–	0	–	0	8	–	1	–	0
Washington and Lee	3	–	1	–	0	8	–	1	–	0
Virginia	1	–	1	–	0	6	–	3	–	0
VPI	1	–	2	–	0	5	–	4	–	0
Johns Hopkins	0	–	1	–	0	0	–	9	–	0
North Carolina A&M	0	–	2	–	0	4	–	3	–	0
North Carolina	0	–	4	–	0	3	–	4	–	1
$ – Conference champion

The 1912 VPI Gobblers football team represented Virginia Agricultural and Mechanical College and Polytechnic Institute in the 1912 college football season. The team was led by their head coach Branch Bocock and finished with a record of five wins and four losses (5–4).

== Schedule ==
Date	Time	Opponent	Site	Result	Attendance	Source
September 28		Roanoke*	Miles Field; Blacksburg, VA	W 40–0		
October 5		Hampden–Sydney*	Miles Field; Blacksburg, VA	W 42–7		
October 12	3:00 p.m.	at Princeton*	University Field; Princeton, NJ	L 0–31		
October 19		Western Maryland*	Miles Field; Blacksburg, VA	W 44–0		
October 26		vs. North Carolina	State Fair Grounds; Raleigh, NC	W 26–0	2,000	
November 2		Medical College of Virginia*	Miles Field; Blacksburg, VA	L 0–10		
November 9	3:00 p.m.	vs. Washington and Lee	Fair Grounds; Roanoke, VA	L 6–20	3,500	
November 16		West Virginia*	Miles Field; Blacksburg, VA (rivalry)	W 41–0		
November 28		at Georgetown	Georgetown Field; Washington, DC	L 3–24		
*Non-conference game

== Before the season ==
The 1911 VPI football team compiled a 6–1–2 record and were led by Lew Riess in his only season as head coach.

== Game summaries ==
=== Roanoke ===
VPI's first game of the season was a victory over Roanoke at Miles Field.

The starting lineup for VPI was: Hodgson (left end), Pick (left tackle), Breckenridge (left guard), Evans (center), Whitney (right guard), Burruss (right tackle), Lefebre (right end), Legge (quarterback), Vawter (left halfback), Magill (right halfback), Rogers (fullback). The substitutes were: Saunders and Schultz.

The starting lineup for Roanoke was: Watson Goodnight (left end), Hoeletz (left tackle), Bawker (left guard), E. C. Reitzel (center), Harr (right guard), William Barnhardt (right tackle), Doub (right end), Harmon (quarterback), J. F. Bevlin (left halfback), Moore (right halfback), R. S. Kime (fullback).

=== Hampden–Sydney ===
After their victory over Roanoke, VPI played Hampden–Sydney College at Miles Field.

The starting lineup for VPI was: Hodgson (left end), Burruss (left tackle), Moore (left guard), Evans (center), Whitney (right guard), Pick (right tackle), Lefebre (right end), Legge (quarterback), Huddle (left halfback), Parrish (right halfback), Magill (fullback).

The starting lineup for Hampden–Sydney was: G. W. Jones (left end), Robert Guthrie (left tackle), John Moore (left guard), Marvin Bowling (center), S. B. Forbus (right guard), Loyal Benedict (right tackle), Frank Ebel (right end), Alexander Carrington (quarterback), Bernard Driver (left halfback), Carroll McClung (right halfback), Donald Corke (fullback).

=== Princeton ===
VPI at Princeton

Team	1	2	3	4	Total
VPI	0	0	0	0	0
• Princeton	14	7	10	0	31

- Date: October 12, 1912
- Location: University Field
  Princeton, NJ
- Game start: 3:00 p.m.
- Referee: Crowell (Swarthmore)

The starting lineup for VPI was: Hughes (left end), Burruss (left tackle), Anderson (left guard), Evans (center), Breckenridge (right guard), Pick (right tackle), Lefebre (right end), Legge (quarterback), Saunders (left halfback), Hodgson (right halfback), Parrish (fullback). The substitutes were: Moore.

The starting lineup for Princeton was: Andrews (left end), Phillips (left tackle), Wilber "Rip" Shenk (left guard), Arthur Bluethenthal (center), William John Logan (right guard), Edward Trenkmann (right tackle), F. Trenkman (right end), S. Baker (quarterback), Talbot Pendleton (left halfback), E. Waller (right halfback), Wallace "Butch" DeWitt (fullback). The substitutes were: Hobey Baker, Harold Ballin, Doolittle, Emmons, Longstrieth, Wilder Penfield, Bradley Streit, I. Swart, W. Swart, H. Waller, Wight.

=== Western Maryland ===
The starting lineup for VPI was: Hodgson (left end), Burruss (left tackle), Breckenridge (left guard), Evans (center), Lefebre (right guard), Schultz (right tackle), Legge (right end), Rogers (quarterback), Hughes (left halfback), Vawter (right halfback), Magill (fullback).

The starting lineup for Western Maryland was: William Hook (left end), Pritchett (left tackle), M. Twigg (left guard), William Husung (center), Leon Cooper (right guard), John Billingslea (right tackle), Edward Weaver (right end), Frank Bowers (quarterback), Julian Numbers (left halfback), Warren Taylor (right halfback), Twigg (fullback).

=== North Carolina ===
The starting lineup for VPI was: Hodgson (left end), Burruss (left tackle), Breckenridge (left guard), Evans (center), Lefebre (right guard), Schultz (right tackle), Hughes (right end), Rogers (quarterback), Parrish (left halfback), Legge (right halfback), Vawter (fullback). The substitutes were: Anderson, Mackan, Magill, Pick, Rogers and Whitehead.

The starting lineup for North Carolina was: Foust (left end), Lonnie Abernethy (left tackle), John Johnson (left guard), Jones (center), Olin Jennings (right guard), Ralph Stevens (right tackle), Long (right end), William Tillett (quarterback), William Wakeley (left halfback), Charles Moore (right halfback), Richard Abernethy (fullback). The substitutes were: Blake Applewhite, Bagwell, Gaston Dortch, Erwin, William Huske and Robert Strange.

=== Medical College of Virginia ===
Medical College of Virginia vs. VPI

Team	1	2	3	4	Total
• MCV	0	0	3	7	10
VPI	0	0	0	0	0

- Date: November 2, 1912
- Location: Miles Field
  Blacksburg, VA
- Referee: Sampson

The starting lineup for VPI was: Taylor (left end), Burruss (left tackle), Pick (left guard), Evans (center), Lefebre (right guard), Schultz (right tackle), Mackan (right end), Hodgson (quarterback), Anderson (left halfback), Vawter (right halfback), Legge (fullback).

The starting lineup for Medical College of Virginia was: Foster (left end), James Walker (left tackle), Raymond Brockwell (left guard), John Cofer (center), Norman Roblee (right guard), Hedgepeth (right tackle), Arnold (right end), George Schenck (quarterback), Johns (left halfback), Elder (right halfback), Hardy (fullback).

=== Washington and Lee ===
Washington & Lee vs. VPI

Team	1	2	3	4	Total
• W&L	3	0	7	10	20
VPI	6	0	0	0	6

- Date: November 9, 1912
- Location: Fair Grounds
  Roanoke, VA
- Game start: 3:00 p.m.
- Game attendance: 3,500
- Referee: Jack Gass

The starting lineup for VPI was: Hughes (left end), Burruss (left tackle), Moore (left guard), Schultz (center), Lefebre (right guard), Pick (right tackle), Magill (right end), Rogers (quarterback), Parrish (left halfback), Legge (right halfback), Vawter (fullback). The substitutes were: Anderson, Evans, Hodgson, Taylor and Whitehead.

The starting lineup for Washington and Lee was: J. P. Hieatt (left end), Ted Shultz (left tackle), James Miller (left guard), Carl Moore (center), Paul Rogers (right guard), Buck Miles (right tackle), Kelly Francis (right end), W. C. Raftery (quarterback), Walter Terry (left halfback), Edmond Burk (right halfback), Raymond Beuhring (fullback). The substitutes were: Henry Barker, M. S. Barrow, David Bone, Carson, Edward Donahue, Edmonds, W. H. Neblett, Henry Peeples, James Rothrock, Mark Stewart and W. R. Walton.

=== West Virginia ===
The starting lineup for VPI was: Magill (left end), Burruss (left tackle), Moore (left guard), Evans (center), Lefebre (right guard), Pick (right tackle), Whitehead (right end), Rogers (quarterback), Hughes (left halfback), Vawter (right halfback), Hodgson (fullback).

The starting lineup for West Virginia was: Harrison (left end), Robinson (left tackle), Melville Boyles (left guard), Davis (center), Truman Martin (right guard), Musgrove (right tackle), Lackman (right end), Wilkerson (quarterback), Carden (left halfback), Race (right halfback), Carl Bachmann (fullback).

=== Georgetown ===
VPI at Georgetown

Team	1	2	3	4	Total
VPI	0	0	3	0	3
• Georgetown	0	10	7	7	24

- Date: November 28, 1912
- Location: Georgetown Field
  Washington, DC
- Referee: Jack Gass

The starting lineup for VPI was: Magill (left end), Burruss (left tackle), Moore (left guard), Evans (center), Pick (right guard), Whitehead (right tackle), Huddle (right end), Rogers (quarterback), Hodgson (left halfback), Legge (right halfback), Vawter (fullback). The substitutes were: Anderson, Hughes, Mackan, Magill, Parrish, Peake, Saunders, Schultz and Taylor.

The starting lineup for Georgetown was: Charles Bergen (left end), Jack Hegarty (left tackle), Eddie Mullaney (left guard), Marvin Ritch (center), Tom Moriarty (right guard), David White (right tackle), Bill Martin (right end), Harry Costello (quarterback), Harry Kelly (left halfback), James Fury (right halfback), Jim Dunn (fullback). The substitutes were: Earl Campazzi, Sam Foley, Ed Heiskell, John Petritz and George Van Duyne.

== Players ==
The following players were members of the 1912 football team according to the roster published in the 1913 edition of The Bugle, the Virginia Tech yearbook.

VPI 1912 roster
Quarterback: James Booth Rogers; Guards: Gordon Lefebre; Arthur Penick Moore; Lewis A. Pick; Tackles: William Henry Burruss (Capt.); Werner Joseph Schultz; Thomas M. Whitehead; Center: Peyton Evans	Ends: Asbury Nathaniel Hodgson; Houston Boyd Hughes; C. B. Mackan; Halfbacks: Withrow Reynolds Legge; Orrin Rankin Magill; David Walker Parrish; Fullback: John Rudisil Vawter	Substitutes: Anderson; Breckenridge; Huddle; Peake; Sanders; Franklin Minor Taylor; Whitney

== Coaching and training staff ==
- Head coach: Branch Bocock
- Manager: Charles Montgomery Hobart
