= Francis McCaffrey =

Francis McCaffrey may refer to:

- Fran McCaffery, American college basketball coach
- Frank McCaffrey, American football player and coach
- Francis J. McCaffrey, American lawyer and politician from New York
- Francis J. McCaffrey Jr., American lawyer and politician from New York
