= VMI–Washington and Lee rivalry =

American college sports rivalry

VMI–W&L rivalry
- Sport: Football, basketball, baseball, lacrosse
- Teams: VMI; Washington & Lee
- First meeting: 1873 (football)

The VMI–Washington and Lee rivalry is a rivalry in both football, basketball, baseball, and lacrosse. between the VMI Keydets and Washington and Lee Generals. Both teams played each other in the South's first football game in 1874. "Washington and Lee has the country club playboys who wrap sweaters around their shoulders and drive around in expensive cars any time they want. VMI cadets are in uniform and their lifestyles are completely controlled." Stonewall Jackson went to VMI and Robert E. Lee is a namesake of Washington & Lee. According to the 1895 VMI yearbook, "W and L U beating us at football would lead to the inevitable consequence, death due to mortification, or heart disease."

== Football ==
VMI victories	Washington & Lee victories	Tie games

No.	Date	Location	Winning team		Losing team	
1	1873		VMI	2	W&L	4
2	1891		VMI	8	W&L	0
3	1891		Tie	0	Tie	0
4	1892		VMI	30	W&L	6
5	1893		VMI	28	W&L	0
6	1894		VMI	4	W&L	0
7	1894		VMI	16	W&L	0
8	1895		VMI	18	W&L	0
9	1895		VMI	30	W&L	0

No.	Date	Location	Winning team		Losing team	
10	1896		VMI	12	W&L	0
11	1896		VMI	0	W&L	6
12	1898		VMI	29	W&L	5
13	1899		VMI	39	W&L	0
14	1900		VMI	11	W&L	0
15	1900		VMI	41	W&L	0
16	1901		VMI	46	W&L	0
17	1902		VMI	11	W&L	0
Series: VMI leads 14–0–1

== See also ==
- List of NCAA college football rivalry games
