= James Bell Bullitt =

American physician, football player, and coach (1874–1964)

Biographical details
- Born: January 18, 1874; Louisville, Kentucky, U.S.
- Died: March 7, 1964 (aged 90); Concord, Massachusetts, U.S.

Playing career
- 1892–1893: Washington and Lee

Coaching career (HC unless noted)
- 1893: Washington and Lee

Head coaching record
- Overall: 1–2

James Bell Bullitt (January 18, 1874 – March 7, 1964) was an American physician and a college football player and coach. He served as a player-coach at Washington and Lee University in Lexington, Virginia, in 1893. Bullitt was born on January 18, 1874, in Louisville, Kentucky. He earned a master's degree from Washington and Lee and a degree from the University of Virginia School of Medicine. He taught at Virginia and the University of Mississippi before joining the faculty at the University of North Carolina School of Medicine as a professor of pathology in 1913. Bullitt died at a nursing home, in Concord, Massachusetts, on March 7, 1964.

== Head coaching record ==
Year	Team	Overall	Conference	Standing	Bowl/playoffs
Washington and Lee Generals (Independent) (1893)
1893	Washington and Lee	1–2			
Washington and Lee:		1–2			
Total:		1–2			
