= Harry Costello =

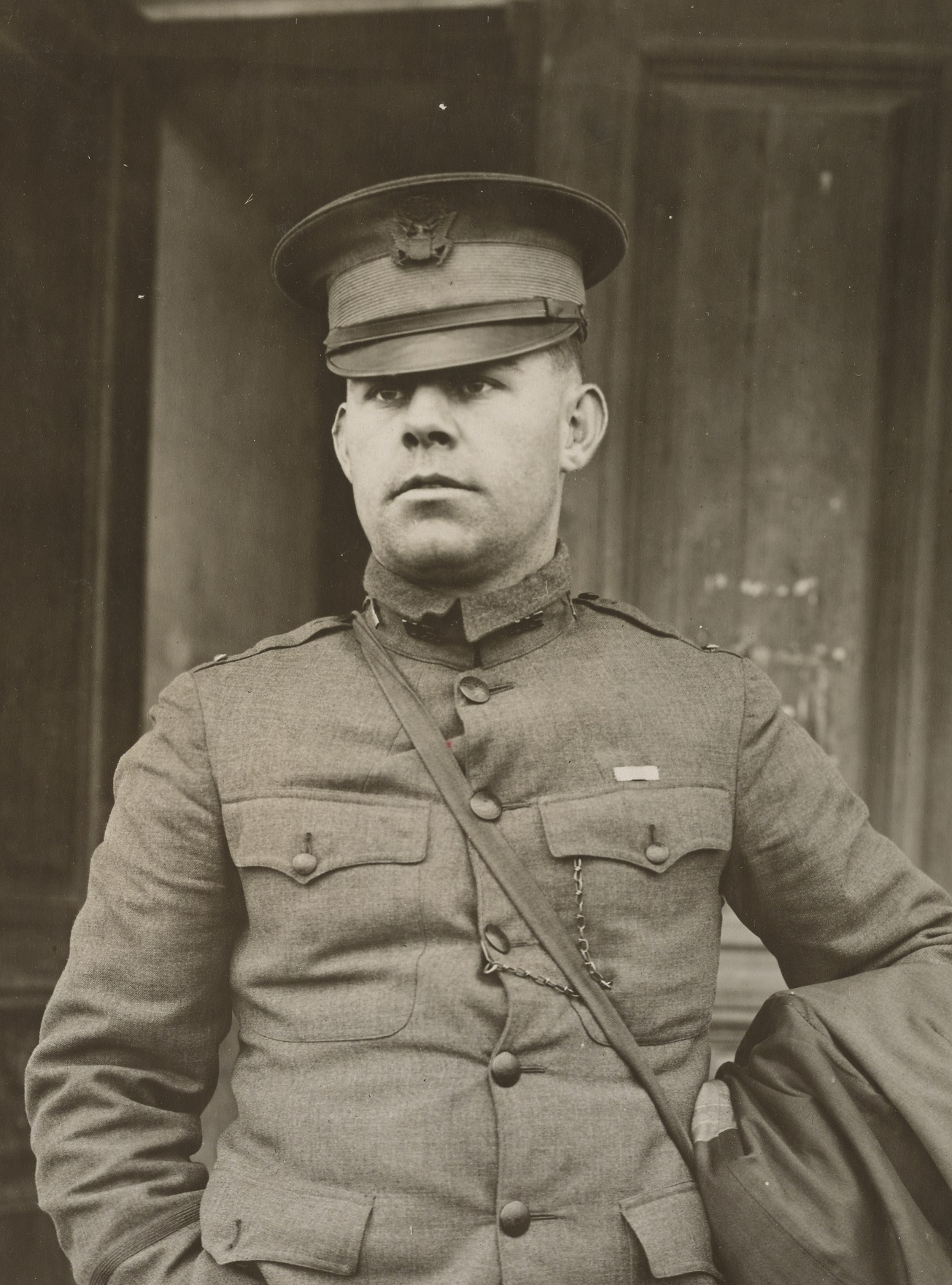
- Costello as lieutenant during the Allied intervention in the Russian Civil War 1918

Biographical details
- Born: November 9, 1891; Meriden, Connecticut, U.S.
- Died: August 24, 1968 (aged 76); Washington, D.C., U.S.

Playing career
- 1910–1913: Georgetown
- Position: Quarterback

Coaching career (HC unless noted)
- 1914: South Carolina (assistant)
- 1915–1916: Detroit

Head coaching record
- Overall: 4–7–2

Accomplishments and honors

Awards
- Third-team All-Service (1917); All-Southern (1912)

Harry Joseph Costello (November 9, 1891 – August 24, 1968) was an American college football player and coach who later served as an officer in the Allied intervention in the Russian Civil War.

== Early years ==
The son of Patrick Costello, he was born in 1891.

=== Georgetown University ===
He was an alumnus of Georgetown University, where he has been described as a "legendary quarterback."

==== 1911 ====
Costello was a halfback selected for Outing magazine's "Football Honor List for 1911" picked by coaches from the East and West. The only other southern player on the list was Ray Morrison.

==== 1912 ====
In 1912 Georgetown won the South Atlantic Intercollegiate Athletic Association (SAIAA) posting an 8–1 record with its only loss to 1912 Carlisle Indians football team under first-year head coach Frank Gargan. Nathan Stauffer of Collier's Weekly selected Costello as his All-Southern quarterback.

==== 1913 ====
He was captain in his final season of 1913.

== Coaching career ==
Harry Costello (right) with former coach Frank Gargan in 1957

Costello was the head football at the College of Detroit for the 1915 and 1916 seasons. His coaching record at Detroit was 4–7–2.

== Soldier in Russia ==
Costello joined the United States Army and trained at Fort Sheridan. Elements of the 85th Infantry Division, including Costellos formation, went to Russia as part of the Allied intervention in the Russian Civil War, where they were stationed in Arkhangelsk.

== Later life ==
In 1957, he was living in Waterford, Virginia. He died in Washington, D.C., in 1968.

== Head coaching record ==
Year	Team	Overall	Conference	Standing	Bowl/playoffs
Detroit Tigers (Independent) (1915–1916)
1915	Detroit	1–5			
1916	Detroit	3–2–2			
Detroit College:		4–7–2			
Total:		4–7–2			

== Publications ==
- Harry J. Costello:Why Did We Go to Russia?, University of Michigan Library , Detroit, 1920
