= John S. Elliott =

American football player and coach (1889–1950)

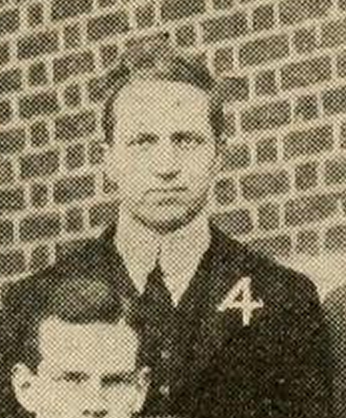
- Ellott pictured in the 1912 Virginia football team photo

Biographical details
- Born: May 9, 1889; Boonville, Missouri, U.S.
- Died: February 13, 1950 (aged 60); Saratoga Springs, New York, U.S.

Playing career
- 1908–1909: Virginia
- Position: End

Coaching career (HC unless noted)
- 1912: Virginia

Head coaching record
- Overall: 6–3

John Speed Elliott (May 9, 1889 – February 13, 1950) was an American college football player and coach. He served as the head football coach at the University of Virginia for one season, in 1912, compiling a record of 6–3.

== Head coaching record ==
Year	Team	Overall	Conference	Standing	Bowl/playoffs
Virginia Orange and Blue (South Atlantic Intercollegiate Athletic Association) (1912)
1912	Virginia	6–3	1–1	4th	
Virginia:		6–3	1–1		
Total:		6–3			
