= B. J. Dickey =

American football quarterback

No. 10, 18
- Position: Quarterback

Personal information
- Born: c. 1959
- Listed height: 6 ft 0 in (1.83 m)
- Listed weight: 188 lb (85 kg)

Career information
- High school: Ottawa-Glandorf High School (Ottawa, OH)
- College: University of Michigan (1977–1979, 1981)

Brian Jon Dickey (born c. 1959) is an American former football player. He was a quarterback for the University of Michigan Wolverines football team from 1977 to 1979 and again in 1981.

Dickey grew up in Ottawa, Ohio, attended Ottawa-Glandorf High School, and enrolled at the University of Michigan in 1977. As a freshman, Dickey appeared in three games as a backup to Rick Leach. As a sophomore in 1978, he appeared in five games as Leach's backup.

Dickey became Michigan's starting quarterback in 1979. In his first start for Michigan, Dickey completed six of eight passes and rushed for 85 yards in leading the Wolverines to a 49-7 victory over Northwestern. His 74-yard run against Wisconsin stood as a Michigan quarterback record until 1983. In October 1979, Dickey led the Wolverines to a 21-7 victory over rival Michigan State, throwing touchdown passes of 66 yards to Ralph Clayton and of six yards to Anthony Carter. Dickey also threw a 30-yard touchdown pass to Carter in the 1979 Gator Bowl.

Dickey had 870 yards of total offense in 1979, 586 passing yards and 284 rushing yards.

Dickey redshirted during the 1980 season due to a shoulder injury. In August 1981, head coach Bo Schembechler praised Dickey for having "an excellent attitude." Dickey appeared in six games during the 1981 season as a backup to Steve Smith. In the 1981 Bluebonnet Bowl, his final game for Michigan, Dickey ran five yards for a touchdown with five seconds remaining as Michigan defeated UCLA.

During his career at Michigan, Dickey completed 61 of 122 passes for 788 yards, eight touchdowns and six interceptions. He also gained 516 rushing yards and scored seven rushing touchdowns on 112 carries.

In 2013, Dickey won the MVP trophy for his role in Michigan's fifth annual alumni flag football game.
