= John Arbeznik =

American football player (born 1957)

Profile
- Position: Guard

Personal information
- Born: June 13, 1957 (age 69); University Heights, Ohio, U.S.

Career information
- College: Michigan

Awards and highlights
- 2× First-team All-Big Ten (1978, 1979)

John C. Arbeznik (born June 13, 1957) is an American former football player. He played college football for the University of Michigan from 1976 to 1979 and was a first-team All-Big Ten Conference offensive guard in both 1978 and 1979.

== University of Michigan ==
A native of University Heights, Ohio, Arbeznik attended Saint Ignatius High School in Cleveland before enrolling at the University of Michigan in 1975. He played college football as an offensive guard for Bo Schembechler's Michigan Wolverines football teams from 1976 to 1979. At six feet, three inches, and 240 pounds, Arbeznik won a spot in the starting lineup in 1977, but missed most of the season after sustaining a knee injury. He returned the following year and started nine games at left guard for the 1978 Michigan Wolverines football team that compiled a 10–2 record and was ranked No. 5 in the final AP Poll. He was the offensive captain, and a 12-game starter at left guard, for the 1979 Michigan Wolverines football team that compiled an 8–4 record. He was selected as a first-team All-Big Ten Conference offensive guard in both 1978 and 1979.

== Professional football and broadcast career ==
Arbeznik was signed as a free agent by the New Orleans Saints in 1980 and cut at the end of August 1980. He was then signed by the New York Jets in February 1981.

In the fall of 1981, he became an analyst on broadcasts of Michigan football games on WTOD radio in Toledo, Ohio, while also working in a management training program for Procter & Gamble.

He was inducted into the Saint Ignatius High School Athletic Hall of Fame in 1997.
