= 1912 North Carolina A&M Aggies football team =

American college football season

1912 North Carolina A&M Aggies football
- Conference: South Atlantic Intercollegiate Athletic Association
- Record: 4–3 (0–2 SAIAA)
- Head coach: Edward L. Greene (4th season)
- Home stadium: Riddick Field

1912 South Atlantic Intercollegiate Athletic Association football standings
	Conf.					Overall
Team	W		L		T	W		L		T
Georgetown $	5	–	0	–	0	8	–	1	–	0
Washington and Lee	3	–	1	–	0	8	–	1	–	0
Virginia	1	–	1	–	0	6	–	3	–	0
VPI	1	–	2	–	0	5	–	4	–	0
Johns Hopkins	0	–	1	–	0	0	–	9	–	0
North Carolina A&M	0	–	2	–	0	4	–	3	–	0
North Carolina	0	–	4	–	0	3	–	4	–	1
$ – Conference champion

The 1912 North Carolina A&M Aggies football team represented North Carolina College of Agriculture and Mechanic Arts—now known as North Carolina State University—as a member of the South Atlantic Intercollegiate Athletic Association during the 1912 college football season. It was the inaugural season of play for the SAIAA. Led by fourth-year head coach Edward L. Greene, the Aggies compiled an overall record of 4–3 with a mark of 0–2 in conference play.

== Schedule ==
Date	Time	Opponent	Site	Result	Attendance	Source
October 5		USS Franklin*	Riddick Field; Raleigh, NC	W 22–0	2,500	
October 12		Virginia Medical*	Riddick Field; Raleigh, NC	W 7–0		
October 17	3:30 p.m.	Georgetown	Riddick Field; Raleigh, NC	L 0–48		
October 26		at Davidson*	Sprunt Athletic Field; Davidson, NC	W 7–0		
November 2		at Wake Forest*	Wake Forest, NC (rivalry)	W 12–0		
November 16		at Navy*	Worden Field; Annapolis, MD	L 0–40		
November 28	2:30 p.m.	vs. Washington and Lee	Lafayette Field; Norfolk, VA	L 6–16		
*Non-conference game
