= Frank McCaffrey =

American football player and coach (1888–1952)

Biographical details
- Born: December 26, 1888; Bronx, New York, U.S.
- Died: December 26, 1952 (aged 64); Bronx, New York, U.S.

Playing career
- 1908–1909: Fordham
- Position: End

Coaching career (HC unless noted)
- 1917: Fordham

Head coaching record
- Overall: 7–2 (college)

Accomplishments and honors

Awards
- Third-team All-American (1909)

Francis "Bull" McCaffrey (December 26, 1888 – December 26, 1952) was an American football player and coach. McCaffrey was the co-head football coach at Fordham University with Frank Gargan for one season, in 1917, and compiled a record of 7–2. McCaffrey was also the head football coach of Erasmus Hall High School in Brooklyn and DeWitt Clinton High School in the Bronx.

McCaffrey graduated from Fordham in 1911, where he starred in football and baseball. A 5'8", 165-pound end, he earned the nickname "Bull" for his aggressive playing style. He was Fordham's first-ever All-America selection when in 1909, his junior season, when Walter Camp chose him as one of the college football's premier players. Fordham discontinued football before McCaffrey's senior season in 1910, so Princeton University offered him a football scholarship. McCaffrey did not accept the scholarship because his mother thought that football was too rough and she did not want to see him get hurt, which had been a concern of hers while McCaffrey played for Fordham.

After graduating from the New York University College of Dentistry, McCaffrey practiced oral surgery in New York City. He was the chief of the dental clinic at Fordham Hospital and an associate professor at Columbia University. McCaffrey died on his 64th birthday, December 26, 1952, at his home in The Bronx. His son, Francis J. McCaffrey Jr. was a New York State legislator.

== Head coaching record ==
=== College ===
Year	Team	Overall	Conference	Standing	Bowl/playoffs
Fordham Maroon (Independent) (1917)
1917	Fordham	7–2			
Fordham:		7–2			
Total:		7–2			
