= 1912 North Carolina Tar Heels football team =

American college football season

1912 North Carolina Tar Heels football
- Conference: South Atlantic Intercollegiate Athletic Association
- Record: 3–4–1 (0–4 SAIAA)
- Head coach: C. W. Martin (1st season)
- Captain: William Tillett
- Home stadium: Campus Athletic Field (II)

1912 South Atlantic Intercollegiate Athletic Association football standings
	Conf.					Overall
Team	W		L		T	W		L		T
Georgetown $	5	–	0	–	0	8	–	1	–	0
Washington and Lee	3	–	1	–	0	8	–	1	–	0
Virginia	1	–	1	–	0	6	–	3	–	0
VPI	1	–	2	–	0	5	–	4	–	0
Johns Hopkins	0	–	1	–	0	0	–	3	–	0
North Carolina A&M	0	–	2	–	0	4	–	3	–	0
North Carolina	0	–	4	–	0	3	–	4	–	1
$ – Conference champion

The 1912 North Carolina Tar Heels football team represented the University of North Carolina in the 1912 college football season. The team captain of the 1912 season was Wm. Tillett.

== Schedule ==
Date	Time	Opponent	Site	Result	Attendance	Source
October 5	3:30 p.m.	vs. Davidson	Wearn Field; Charlotte, NC	W 13–0		
October 12		Wake Forest	Campus Athletic Field (II); Chapel Hill, NC (rivalry)	W 9–2		
October 19		Robert Bingham School	Campus Athletic Field (II); Chapel Hill, NC	W 47–0		
October 26	3:00 p.m.	vs. VPI	State Fairgrounds (II); Raleigh, NC	L 0–26	2,000	
November 2	3:00 p.m.	vs. Georgetown	Broad Street Park (I); Richmond, VA	L 10–37		
November 9		South Carolina	Campus Athletic Field (II); Chapel Hill, NC (rivalry)	T 6–6		
November 16	3:00 p.m.	vs. Washington and Lee	Cone Athletic Park (II); Greensboro, NC	L 0–31		
November 28	2:40 p.m.	vs. Virginia	Broad Street Park (I); Richmond, VA (South's Oldest Rivalry)	L 0–66		
