= Ted Shultz =

American football player and coach (1893–1986)

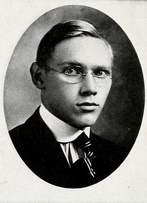
- Shultz c. 1916

Biographical details
- Born: November 24, 1893; Logansport, Indiana
- Died: February , 1986

Playing career
- 1912–1915: Washington and Lee
- 1917: Camp Jackson
- Position: Tackle

Coaching career (HC unless noted)
- 1916: Denver (freshman)
- 1919: Washington and Lee (assistant)

Accomplishments and honors

Awards
- All-American (1914); 2x All-Southern (1914, 1915)

Edwin Beswick Shultz (November 24, 1893 – February 1986) was a college football player and coach.

== Early years ==
Shultz was born on November 24, 1893, in Logansport, Indiana to Dr. John Beswick Shultz and Anna L. Cooper. He attended Logansport High School.

== Washington and Lee ==
He was president of the student body.

=== Football ===
Shultz was a prominent All-American tackle for the Washington and Lee Generals of Washington and Lee University from 1912 to 1915. He was renowned for his size at the time, somewhere between 6 feet 2 inches and 6 feet 4 inches.

==== 1912 ====
Shultz was the only freshman to make the varsity this season. Shultz and captain Buck Miles were the tackles, a duo which "scintillated."

==== 1914 ====
Shultz was a member of the undefeated SAIAA champion 1914 team, which secured a share of the title when it finished the season with a victory over North Carolina A & M. The team included College Football Hall of Fame inductee Harry "Cy" Young.

An account of the 10 to 0 victory over Swarthmore that year reads "Left tackle Ted Shultz starred for the victors making long gains on forward passes and effecting tackles that checked Swarthmore."

==== 1915 ====
He was captain of W&L's 1915 team. During World War I, he played for Camp Jackson.

=== Basketball ===
Shultz also played on the basketball team.

== Denver ==
Shultz was once a secretary for the YMCA in Denver, Colorado, and coached the freshman team of the University of Denver.
