= 1912 Georgetown Blue and Gray football team =

American college football season

1912 Georgetown Blue and Gray football

SAIAA champion
- Conference: South Atlantic Intercollegiate Athletic Association
- Record: 8–1 (5–0 SAIAA)
- Head coach: Frank Gargan (1st season)
- Captain: Jack Hegarty
- Home stadium: Georgetown Field

1912 South Atlantic Intercollegiate Athletic Association football standings
	Conf.					Overall
Team	W		L		T	W		L		T
Georgetown $	5	–	0	–	0	8	–	1	–	0
Washington and Lee	3	–	1	–	0	8	–	1	–	0
Virginia	1	–	1	–	0	6	–	3	–	0
VPI	1	–	2	–	0	5	–	4	–	0
Johns Hopkins	0	–	1	–	0	0	–	3	–	0
North Carolina A&M	0	–	2	–	0	4	–	3	–	0
North Carolina	0	–	4	–	0	3	–	4	–	1
$ – Conference champion

The 1912 Georgetown Blue and Gray football team represented Georgetown University during the 1912 college football season. Led by Frank Gargan in his first year as head coach, the team went 8–1 and won a South Atlantic Intercollegiate Athletic Association (SAIAA) championship.

Quarterback Harry Costello was an All-Southern selection.

== Schedule ==
Date	Time	Opponent	Site	Result	Source
September 28		Randolph–Macon*	Georgetown Field; Washington, DC	W 39–0	
October 5		Mount St. Mary's*	Georgetown Field; Washington, DC	W 27–0	
October 12		Washington and Lee	Georgetown Field; Washington, DC	W 20–0	
October 17	3:30 p.m.	at North Carolina A&M	Riddick Field; Raleigh, NC	W 48–0	
October 26		Carlisle*	Georgetown Field; Washington, DC	L 20–34	
November 2	3:00 p.m.	vs. North Carolina	Broad Street Park; Richmond, VA	W 37–10	
November 9		Washington College*	Georgetown Field; Washington, DC	W 84–0	
November 16		Virginia	Georgetown Field; Washington, DC	W 16–13	
November 28		VPI	Georgetown Field; Washington, DC	W 24–3	
*Non-conference game
