= Chris Godfrey =

American football player (born 1958)

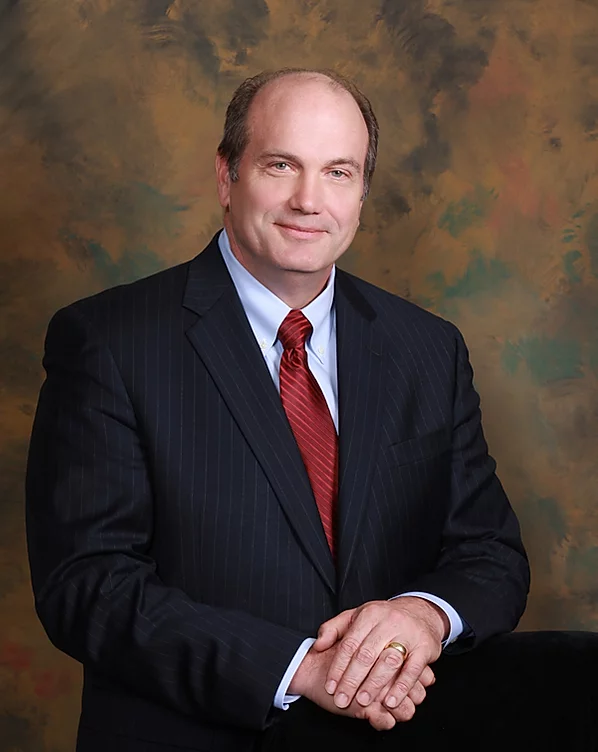

No. 90, 61, 60, 70
- Position: Guard

Personal information
- Born: May 17, 1958 (age 68); Detroit, Michigan, U.S.
- Listed height: 6 ft 3 in (1.91 m)
- Listed weight: 263 lb (119 kg)

Career information
- High school: De La Salle (Warren, Michigan)
- College: Michigan
- NFL draft: 1980: undrafted

Career history
- Washington Redskins (1980)*; New York Jets (1980); Green Bay Packers (1981); Michigan Panthers (1983-1984); New York Giants (1984–1987); Seattle Seahawks (1988)
- * Offseason or practice squad member only

Awards and highlights
- Super Bowl champion (XXI)

Career NFL statistics
- Games played: 65
- Games started: 47
- Stats at Pro Football Reference

Christopher J Godfrey (born May 17, 1958) is an American former professional football player who was a guard in the National Football League (NFL), primarily for the New York Giants. He started in Super Bowl XXI and honored as the New York Giants Alumni Man of the Year. Godfrey played college football for the Michigan Wolverines. He also played with the Michigan Panthers of the United States Football League (USFL). His daughters Mary Grace, international childrenswear designer and couture dressmaker, and Anastassia were members of the Michigan Wolverines swim team, and his son John was a defensive lineman for the Ball State Cardinals football team.

Godfrey founded the organization Life Athletes. He has visited schools in throughout the United States and internationally promoting Christianity and pro-marriage family values. New York Archbishop John Cardinal O'Connor, New York Giants owners Wellington and Ann Mara and the Knights of Columbus were key supporters of his work.

He is the owner of Godfrey Law offices located in South Bend, Indiana.
