= 1912 Virginia Orange and Blue football team =

American college football season

1912 Virginia Orange and Blue football
- Conference: South Atlantic Intercollegiate Athletic Association
- Record: 6–3 (1–1 SAIAA)
- Head coach: John S. Elliott (1st season)
- Home stadium: Madison Hall Field

1912 South Atlantic Intercollegiate Athletic Association football standings
	Conf.					Overall
Team	W		L		T	W		L		T
Georgetown $	5	–	0	–	0	8	–	1	–	0
Washington and Lee	3	–	1	–	0	8	–	1	–	0
Virginia	1	–	1	–	0	6	–	3	–	0
VPI	1	–	2	–	0	5	–	4	–	0
Johns Hopkins	0	–	1	–	0	0	–	3	–	0
North Carolina A&M	0	–	2	–	0	4	–	3	–	0
North Carolina	0	–	4	–	0	3	–	4	–	1
$ – Conference champion

The 1912 Virginia Orange and Blue football team represented the University of Virginia as a member of the South Atlantic Intercollegiate Athletic Association (SAIAA) during the 1912 college football season. Led by John S. Elliott in his first and only season as head coach, the Orange and Blue compiled an overall record of 6–3 with a mark of 1–1 in conference play, placing third in the SAIAA.

== Schedule ==
Date	Time	Opponent	Site	Result	Source
September 28		William & Mary	Madison Hall Field; Charlottesville, VA	W 60–0	
October 5		Randolph–Macon	Madison Hall Field; Charlottesville, VA	W 45–0	
October 12		Hampden–Sydney	Madison Hall Field; Charlottesville, VA	W 10–0	
October 14		South Carolina	Madison Hall Field; Charlottesville, VA	W 19–0	
October 19		VMI	Madison Hall Field; Charlottesville, VA	L 0–19	
October 24		Norfolk Blues	Madison Hall Field; Charlottesville, VA	W 7–0	
November 2		at Vanderbilt	Dudley Field; Nashville, TN	L 0–13	
November 16		at Georgetown	Georgetown Field; Washington, DC	L 13–16	
November 28	2:40 p.m.	vs. North Carolina	Broad Street Park; Richmond, VA (South's Oldest Rivalry)	W 66–0	
