= Frank Gargan =

American football player and coach (1888–1960)

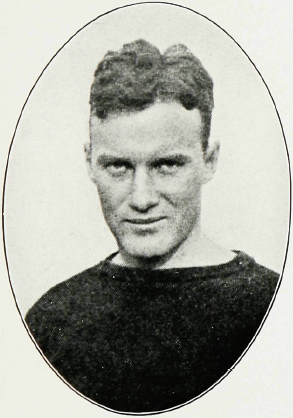
- Gargan pictured in The Maroon 1917, Fordham yearbook

Biographical details
- Born: July 1, 1888; New York City, New York, U.S.
- Died: August 18, 1960 (aged 72); Greenwich, Connecticut, U.S.

Playing career
- 1907–1909: Fordham
- Position: Quarterback

Coaching career (HC unless noted)
- 1911: Georgetown (assistant)
- 1912–1913: Georgetown
- 1914: RPI
- 1916–1917: Fordham
- 1920–1921: NYU
- 1922–1926: Fordham

Head coaching record
- Overall: 55–40–8

Accomplishments and honors

Championships
- SAIAA (1912)

John Francis Gargan (July 1, 1888 – August 18, 1960) was an American college football player and coach. He served as the head football coach at Georgetown University (1912–1913), Rensselaer Polytechnic Institute (1914), Fordham University (1916–1917, 1922–1926) and New York University (1920–1921), compiling career coaching record of 55–40–8. In 1917, Gargan was co-head coach with Frank McCaffrey for Fordham.

== Head coaching record ==
Year	Team	Overall	Conference	Standing	Bowl/playoffs
Georgetown Blue and Gray (South Atlantic Intercollegiate Athletic Association) (1912–1913)
1912	Georgetown	8–1	5–0	1st	
1913	Georgetown	4–4	1–1	T–4th	
Georgetown:		12–5	6–1		
RPI Engineers (Independent) (1914)
1914	RPI	4–5			
RPI:		4–5			
Fordham Maroon (Independent) (1916–1917)
1916	Fordham	6–1–1			
1917	Fordham	7–2			
NYU Violets (Independent) (1920–1921)
1920	NYU	2–5–1			
1921	NYU	2–3–3			
NYU:		4–8–4			
Fordham Maroon (Independent) (1922–1926)
1922	Fordham	3–5–2			
1923	Fordham	2–7			
1924	Fordham	6–2			
1925	Fordham	8–1			
1926	Fordham	3–4–1			
Fordham:		28–20–4			
Total:		55–40–8			
National championship Conference title Conference division title or championship game berth

== See also ==
- List of college football head coaches with non-consecutive tenure
