= Jerald Ingram =

American football player and coach (born 1960)

Personal information
- Born: December 24, 1960 (age 65); Dayton, Ohio, U.S.

Career information
- College: Michigan

Career history
- Michigan (1984) Graduate assistant; Ball State (1985) Tight ends coach; Ball State (1986–1990) Running backs coach; Boston College (1991–1993) Running backs coach; Jacksonville Jaguars (1995–2003) Running backs coach; New York Giants (2004–2013) Running backs coach; New York Guardians (2020) Running backs coach

Awards and highlights
- 2× Super Bowl champion (XLII, XLVI)

Jerald Ingram (born December 24, 1960) is an American football coach and a former player. He played college football at the fullback position for the University of Michigan from 1979 to 1981 and later served as the running backs coach for the Jacksonville Jaguars (1995–2003) and New York Giants (2004–2013) of the National Football League (NFL).

== Playing career ==
Ingram was born in Dayton, Ohio, in 1960 and grew up in Beaver, Pennsylvania. He enrolled at the University of Michigan in 1979 and played college football as a fullback for Bo Schembechler's Michigan Wolverines football teams from 1979 to 1981. In three years at Michigan, Ingram gained 191 rushing yards on 46 carries.

== Coaching career ==
Ingram became a football coach after his playing career at Michigan. He began as a graduate assistant at Michigan in 1984 and then held assistant coaching positions at Ball State University (tight ends, 1985; running backs, 1986–1990) and Boston College (running backs, 1991–1993). In 1995, when Tom Coughlin moved from Boston College to the Jacksonville Jaguars, Ingram followed Coughlin and became the Jaguars' running backs coach from 1995 to 2003. When Coughlin joined the New York Giants in 2004, Ingram again followed and became the Giants' running backs coach from 2004 to 2013. In three seasons under Ingram's tutelage, Tiki Barber emerged as a dominant running back in the NFL, gaining over 5,000 rushing yards through the 2004 and 2006 seasons. In 2008, the Giants led the NFL with 2,518 rushing yards and won Super Bowl XLII in 2008 over the previously undefeated New England Patriots. In January 2014, after the 2013 Giants finished with an offense ranked 28th in the NFL, Ingram was fired by the Giants.

In 2019, Ingram was named running backs coach for the New York Guardians of the newly-formed XFL.
