= Branch Bocock =

American sports coach (1884–1946)

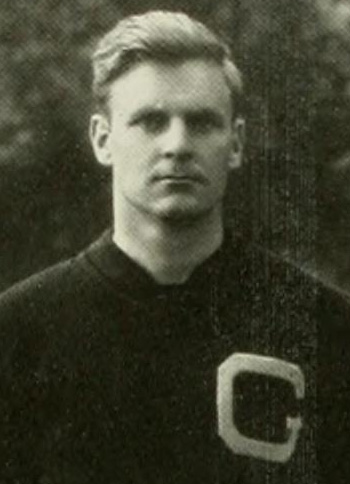
- Bocock pictured in Yackety Yack 1912, North Carolina yearbook

Biographical details
- Born: March 10, 1884; Shenandoah, Virginia, U.S.
- Died: May 25, 1946 (aged 62) near Blackstone, Virginia, U.S.

Playing career

Football
- 1903–1906: Georgetown
- Position: Quarterback

Coaching career (HC unless noted)

Football
- 1908: Georgia
- 1909–1910: VPI
- 1911: North Carolina
- 1912–1915: VPI
- 1920–1921: LSU
- 1925–1926: South Carolina
- 1928–1930: William & Mary
- 1936–1938: William & Mary

Basketball
- 1909–1911: VPI
- 1913–1915: VPI
- 1920–1921: LSU
- 1924–1927: South Carolina

Baseball
- 1910–1911: VPI
- 1914: VPI
- 1922–1923: LSU
- 1925–1927: South Carolina

Administrative career (AD unless noted)
- 1909: VPI
- 1925–1926: South Carolina

Head coaching record
- Overall: 98–55–9 (football); 109–33 (basketball); 70–54–4 (baseball)

Accomplishments and honors

Championships
- Football; 2 Virginia Conference (1929–1930) Basketball; 1 SoCon regular season (1927)

James Branch Bocock (March 10, 1884 – May 25, 1946) was an American college football, college basketball, and college baseball coach. He served as the head football coach at the University of Georgia (1908), Virginia Agricultural and Mechanical College and Polytechnic Institute (VPI)—now known as Virginia Tech (1909–1910, 1912–1915), the University of North Carolina (1911), Louisiana State University (1920–1921), the University of South Carolina (1925–1926), and The College of William & Mary (1928–1930, 1936–1938), compiling a career college football head coaching record of 98–55–9. Bocock was also the head basketball coach at VPI (1909–1911, 1913–1915), LSU (1920–1921), and South Carolina (1924–1927), tallying a career college basketball head coaching mark of 109–33, and the head baseball coach at VPI (1910–1911, 1914), LSU (1922–1923), and South Carolina (1925–1927), amassing a career college baseball head coaching record of 70–54–2.

== Early years ==
Bocock was a quarterback for the Georgetown Hoyas.

== Coaching career ==
Although official records give Bocock credit only for coaching the Georgia Bulldogs football team in 1908, he also coached the last three games of Georgia's 1907 season. In 1907, Georgia head football coach Bull Whitney was caught in a controversy over the revelation that there were at least four paid professionals on the Georgia and Georgia Tech teams during the game played that year. As a result, Georgia removed all known ringers from its team and Whitney was forced to resign, handing the coaching duties over to Bocock for the last three games. Georgia was 2–1 in those three games.

At VPI, Bocock was the team's first true professional coach and the first head football coach to receive a full-time salary.

== Later life ==
Bocock died at the age of 62 on May 25, 1946, at his home near Blackstone, Virginia. He was cremated.

== Head coaching record ==
=== Football ===
| Year | Team | Overall | Conference | Standing | Bowl/playoffs |
|---|---|---|---|---|---|
Georgia Bulldogs (Southern Intercollegiate Athletic Association) (1908)
| 1908 | Georgia | 5–2–1 | 3–2–1 | 6th | |
| Georgia: | | 5–2–1 | 3–2–1 | | |
VPI (Independent) (1909–1910)
| 1909 | VPI | 6–1 | | | |
| 1910 | VPI | 6–2 | | | |
North Carolina Tar Heels (Independent) (1911)
| 1911 | North Carolina | 6–1–1 | | | |
| North Carolina: | | 6–1–1 | | | |
VPI Gobblers (South Atlantic Intercollegiate Athletic Association) (1912–1915)
| 1912 | VPI | 5–4 | | | |
| 1913 | VPI | 7–1–1 | | | |
| 1914 | VPI | 6–2–1 | | | |
| 1915 | VPI | 4–4 | | | |
| VPI: | | 34–14–2 | | | |
LSU Tigers (Southern Intercollegiate Athletic Association) (1920–1921)
| 1920 | LSU | 5–3–1 | 1–3 | | |
| 1921 | LSU | 6–1–1 | 2–1–1 | | |
| LSU: | | 11–4–2 | 3–4–1 | | |
South Carolina Gamecocks (Southern Conference) (1925–1926)
| 1925 | South Carolina | 7–3 | 2–2 | T–10th | |
| 1926 | South Carolina | 6–4 | 4–2 | T–4th | |
| South Carolina: | | 13–7 | 6–4 | | |
William & Mary Indians (Virginia Conference) (1928–1930)
| 1928 | William & Mary | 6–3–2 | 5–1 | 2nd | |
| 1929 | William & Mary | 8–2 | 5–0 | 1st | |
| 1930 | William & Mary | 7–2–1 | 5–0 | 1st | |
William & Mary Indians (Southern Conference) (1936–1938)
| 1936 | William & Mary | 1–8 | 0–5 | 16th | |
| 1937 | William & Mary | 4–5 | 1–3 | 13th | |
| 1938 | William & Mary | 3–7 | 0–4 | 15th | |
| William & Mary: | | 29–27–3 | 16–13 | | |
| Total: | | 98–55–9 | | | |
National championship Conference title Conference division title or championship game berth

=== Basketball ===
Record table
| Season | Team | Overall | Conference | Standing | Postseason |
|---|---|---|---|---|---|
VPI (Independent) (1909–1911)
| 1909–10 | VPI | 11–0 | | | |
| 1910–11 | VPI | 11–1 | | | |
VPI Gobblers (Independent) (1913–1916)
| 1913–14 | VPI | 14–5 | | | |
| 1914–15 | VPI | 9–4 | | | |
| 1915–16 | VPI | 12–3 | | | |
| VPI: | | 57–13 (.814) | | | |
LSU Tigers (Southern Conference) (1920–1921)
| 1920–21 | LSU | 19–4 | 5–2 | | |
| LSU: | | 19–4 (.826) | 5–2 (.714) | | |
South Carolina Gamecocks (Southern Conference) (1924–1927)
| 1924–25 | South Carolina | 10–7 | 4–2 | | |
| 1925–26 | South Carolina | 9–5 | 4–2 | | |
| 1926–27 | South Carolina | 14–4 | 9–1 | 1st | |
| South Carolina: | | 33–16 (.673) | 17–5 (.773) | | |
| Total: | | 109–33 (.768) | | | |
National champion Postseason invitational champion Conference regular season champion Conference regular season and conference tournament champion Division regular season champion Division regular season and conference tournament champion Conference tournament champion

=== Baseball ===
Record table
| Season | Team | Overall | Conference | Standing | Postseason |
|---|---|---|---|---|---|
VPI (Southern Conference) (1910–1911)
| 1910 | VPI | | | | |
| 1911 | VPI | | | | |
VPI Gobblers (Southern Conference) (1914)
| 1914 | VPI | 15–4–1 | | | |
| VPI: | | 38–18–2 (.672) | | | |
LSU Tigers (Southern Conference) (1922–1923)
| 1922 | LSU | 7–6 | | | |
| 1923 | LSU | 8–9–2 | | | |
| LSU: | | 15–15–2 (.500) | | | |
South Carolina Gamecocks (Southern Conference) (1925–1927)
| 1925 | South Carolina | 4–9 | | | |
| 1926 | South Carolina | 6–4 | | | |
| 1927 | South Carolina | 7–8 | | | |
| South Carolina: | | 17–21 (.447) | | | |
| Total: | | 70–54–4 (.563) | | | |

== See also ==
- List of college football head coaches with non-consecutive tenure
