= Edward L. Greene =

American football player and sports coach (1884–1952)

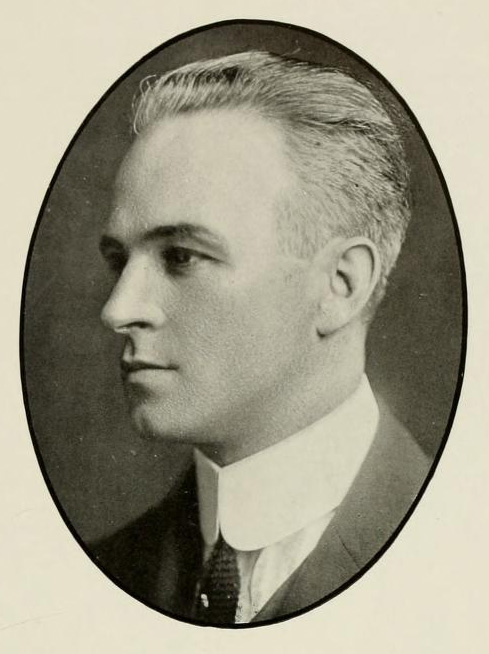
- Greene pictured in The Agromeck 1912, North Carolina State yearbook

Biographical details
- Born: March 29, 1884; New Haven, Connecticut, U.S.
- Died: September 27, 1952 (aged 68); Mamaroneck, New York, U.S.

Playing career

Football
- 1904–1907: Penn
- Position: Halfback

Coaching career (HC unless noted)

Football
- 1908: North Carolina
- 1909–1913: North Carolina A&M

Baseball
- 1912: North Carolina A&M

Head coaching record
- Overall: 28–11–5 (football); 13–6–1 (baseball)

Accomplishments and honors

Championships
- Football; 1 SAIAA (1913)

Awards
- All-American (1906)

Edward Lawrence Greene (March 29, 1884 – September 27, 1952) was an American college football player and coach of both college football and college baseball. Greene played football at the University of Pennsylvania as a halfback from 1904 to 1907 and was a consensus selection on the 1906 All-America college football team. He served as the head football coach at the University of North Carolina in 1908 and at North Carolina College of Agriculture and Mechanic Arts—now known as North Carolina State University—from 1909 to 1913.

== Biography ==
Greene was born on March 29, 1884, in New Haven, Connecticut.

Greene served as the head football coach at the University of North Carolina in 1908 and at North Carolina College of Agriculture and Mechanic Arts, now North Carolina State University, from 1909 to 1913, compiling a career college football head coaching record of 28–11–5. He was also the head baseball coach at North Carolina A&M for one season, in 1912, tallying a mark of 13–6–1. He played college football at the University of Pennsylvania, where he was named an All-American in 1906.

Green later served as the general manager of the National Better Business Bureau until his death. He died of a heart attack, on September 27, 1952, in Mamaroneck, New York.

== Head coaching record ==
=== Football ===
| Year | Team | Overall | Conference | Standing | Bowl/playoffs |
|---|---|---|---|---|---|
North Carolina Tar Heels (South Atlantic Intercollegiate Athletic Association) (1908)
| 1908 | North Carolina | 3–3–3 | 1–2–2 | 4th | |
| North Carolina: | | 3–3–3 | 1–2–2 | | |
North Carolina A&M Aggies (Independent) (1909–1911)
| 1909 | North Carolina A&M | 6–1 | | | |
| 1910 | North Carolina A&M | 4–0–2 | | | |
| 1911 | North Carolina A&M | 5–3 | | | |
North Carolina A&M Aggies (South Atlantic Intercollegiate Athletic Association) (1912–1913)
| 1912 | North Carolina A&M | 4–3 | 0–2 | 7th | |
| 1913 | North Carolina A&M | 6–1 | 2–0 | 1st | |
| North Carolina A&M: | | 25–8–2 | 2–2 | | |
| Total: | | 28–11–5 | | | |
National championship Conference title Conference division title or championship game berth

=== Baseball ===
Record table
| Season | Team | Overall | Conference | Standing | Postseason |
|---|---|---|---|---|---|
North Carolina A&M Farmers (Independent) (1912)
| 1912 | North Carolina A&M | 13–6–1 | | | |
| Total: | | 13–6–1 | | | |
