= Vernon K. Irvine =

American football coach and educator

Biographical details
- Born: June 24, 1871; Bedford, Pennsylvania, U.S.
- Died: September 4, 1942 (aged 71); St. Petersburg, Florida, U.S.
- Education: Princeton University (1895)

Coaching career (HC unless noted)
- 1894: North Carolina

Head coaching record
- Overall: 6–3

Vernon Kremer Irvine (June 24, 1871 – September 4, 1942) was an American college football coach and educator. He served as the head football coach at the University of North Carolina at Chapel Hill for one season, in 1894, compiling a record of 6–3.

Irvine was born on June 24, 1871 in Bedford, Pennsylvania. He attended Phillips Exeter Academy, where he played football as an end, and Princeton University, where he was captain of the "scrub" football team. Irvine was the principal of Butler High School in Butler, Pennsylvania for 36 years, until his retirement in 1934 due to poor health. He moved to St. Petersburg, Florida, where he died September 4, 1942.

== Head coaching record ==
Year	Team	Overall	Conference	Standing	Bowl/playoffs
North Carolina Tar Heels (Independent) (1894)
1894	North Carolina	6–3			
North Carolina:		6–3			
Total:		6–3			
