= 1979 Gator Bowl =

American college football game

- 35th Gator Bowl
Michigan Wolverines	North Carolina Tar Heels
(8–3)	(7–3–1)
Big Ten	ACC
15	17
Head coach: Bo Schembechler	Head coach: Dick Crum
AP / Coaches; 14 / 14
	1	2	3	4	Total
Michigan	0	9	0	6	15
North Carolina	0	7	7	3	17
- Date: December 28, 1979
- Season: 1979
- Stadium: Gator Bowl Stadium
- Location: Jacksonville, Florida
- MVP: Matt Kupec (North Carolina QB), Amos Lawrence (North Carolina RB), John Wangler (Michigan QB), Anthony Carter (Michigan WR)
- Referee: Clint Fuller (SWC)
- Attendance: 70,407

United States TV coverage
- Network: ABC
- Announcers: Keith Jackson, Frank Broyles and Dave Diles

The 1979 Gator Bowl was a college football bowl game played on December 28, 1979. The North Carolina Tar Heels of the Atlantic Coast Conference defeated the Michigan Wolverines of the Big Ten Conference, 17–15.

== Background ==
An 8-1 start (With a loss to #9 Notre Dame) had propelled Michigan to be ranked at 10th in the polls, before a loss to #14 Purdue followed by a loss to #2 Ohio State at home. This made them fall to 14th position in the polls and they finished as 3rd in the Big Ten Conference.

The Tar Heels had started with a score of 4-0 and were ranked #14 before a loss to Wake Forest started a 1-3-1 middle stretch that ended with victories over Virginia and Duke to make them finish 5th in the Atlantic Coast Conference. This was Michigan's first Gator Bowl appearance. This was North Carolina's third ever Gator Bowl appearance.

== Scoring summary ==
=== First quarter ===
- No score

=== Second quarter ===
- Michigan - Virgil, 20-yard field goal
- Michigan - Anthony Carter, 53-yard pass from John Wangler (kick failed)
- North Carolina - Doug Paschal, 1-yard run (Hayes kick)

=== Third quarter ===
- North Carolina - Phil Farris 12-yard pass from Matt Kupec (Hayes kick)

=== Fourth quarter ===
- North Carolina - Hayes 32-yard field goal
- Michigan - Anthony Carter 30-yard pass from B. J. Dickey (B.J. Dickey pass failed)
