= Cone Athletic Park =

Baseball park in Greensboro, North Carolina, US

Cone Athletic Park or Cone Park was the name of two multi-purpose athletic parks that hosted college football and baseball games as well as a minor league baseball team in Greensboro, North Carolina. The first park was built on Summit Avenue in 1902 on donated land. In 1906 it was moved several hundred feet north along Summit Avenue. It was the home of the Greensboro Patriots of the Piedmont League, the North Carolina State League, and other leagues from about 1905 until their move to World War Memorial Stadium in 1930.

The second ballpark was located on the southeast side of Summit Avenue, a mile northeast of the eventual site of World War Memorial Stadium. It was developed by and named for the nearby Cone Mills textile plant. It served as the home grounds for Cone company baseball leagues as well as professional minor league ball. The entrance to the park was directly across from the original 3rd Street and Summit Avenue intersection. Its address, per city directories, was 1100 Summit Avenue.

The wooden ballpark was demolished in 1952, and the land was developed. A portion of the Oaks Motel property, on the south corner of Summit and 4th Street, occupies what was the grandstand portion of the ballpark while the field of play is now the location of several homes on Homeland Avenue and parking lots of businesses on Wendover Avenue.
