= C. W. Martin =

American athlete

Bill Martin
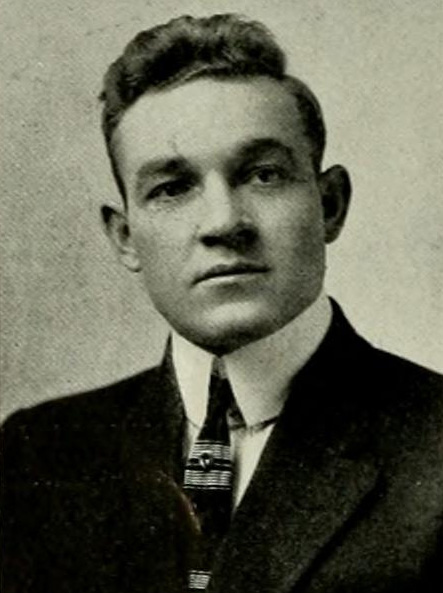
- Martin pictured in Yackety Yack 1913, North Carolina yearbook

Biographical details
- Born: September 17, 1887; Wallula, Washington, U.S.
- Died: March 14, 1978 (aged 90); Walla Walla, Washington, U.S.

Playing career

Football
- ?: Whitman
- 1910: Notre Dame
- Position: End

Coaching career (HC unless noted)

Football
- 1912: North Carolina
- 1930s–1940s: Whitman (assistant)

Track and field
- 1920–1925: Penn State
- 1925: Harvard
- 1934–1969: Whitman

Head coaching record
- Overall: 3–4–1 (football)

Accomplishments and honors

Championships
- Track and field 12 NWC (1935, 1938–1944, 1955, 1957, 1958)

Charles William Martin (September 17, 1887 – March 14, 1978) was an American college football player, track athlete, and sports coach. He served as the head football coach at the University of North Carolina at Chapel Hill for one season in 1912, compiling a record of 3–4–1.

Martin was born September 17, 1887 in Wallula, Washington. He played football at the University of Notre Dame, where he was a teammate of Knute Rockne. In May 1911, he set world records, running the 100-yard dash in 9.6 seconds and the 220-yard dash in 21.1 seconds. Martin died on March 14, 1978, in Walla Walla.

== Head coaching record ==
=== Football ===
| Year | Team | Overall | Conference | Standing | Bowl/playoffs |
|---|---|---|---|---|---|
North Carolina Tar Heels (South Atlantic Intercollegiate Athletic Association) (1912)
| 1912 | North Carolina | 3–4–1 | | | |
| North Carolina: | | 3–4–1 | | | |
| Total: | | 3–4–1 | | | |
