= Washington and Lee Generals football =

American college football program

- First season: 1873; 153 years ago (Note: The team only played this season. They played continuously since 1890; 136 years ago.)
- Athletic director: Jan Hathorn
- Head coach: Garrett LeRose; 7th season, 39–23 (.629)
- Location: Lexington, Virginia
- Field: Wilson Field
- Conference: ODAC
- Colors: Blue and white

Conference championships
- 9 (1914, 1981, 1985, 2006, 2010, 2012, 2015, 2017, 2021)
- Website: generalssports.com/football

The Washington and Lee Generals football team represents Washington and Lee University in Lexington, Virginia. The Generals compete at NCAA Division III level as members of the Old Dominion Athletic Conference.

== History ==
=== 19th century ===
Washington and Lee football dates back to 1873 with a one-game season, featuring a 4–2 win over the VMI Keydets. No player or coaching records are known from that game. UVA historians also remark on a game played between Virginia and Washington and Lee in 1871 with no records. The Generals did not have another intercollegiate team until 1890.

=== 20th century ===
The first golden era of W&L football began in 1905. Between 1905 and 1917, the Generals reeled off 13 straight winning seasons. From 1912 to 1915, W&L went 32–3–1 and won the South Atlantic Intercollegiate Athletic Association (SAIAA) championship in 1914. The 1914 team, coached by Jogger Elcock, was the first team in school history to go undefeated (9–0). Members of that team include All-Southern lineman Ted Shultz and College Football Hall of Fame running back Harry Young. It secured a share of the title when it finished the season with a victory over North Carolina A&M. The school temporarily gave up football in 1954.

== Postseason appearances ==
=== NCAA Division III ===
The Generals have made six appearances in the NCAA Division III playoffs, with a combined record of 0–6.

Year	Round	Opponent	Result
2006	First Round	Wilkes	L, 0–42
2010	First Round	Thomas More	L, 14–42
2012	First Round	Hobart	L, 10–42
2015	First Round	Thomas More	L, 21–51
2017	First Round	Mount Union	L, 0–21
2021	First Round	Mount Union	L, 0–52

== Bowl games ==
The Generals have appeared in one-FBS level bowl game with an overall record of 0–1.

Season	Coach	Bowl	Opponent	Result
1950	George T. Barclay	Gator Bowl	Wyoming	L, 7–20

=== NCAA Division III bowl games ===
The Generals have appeared in four NCAA Division III bowl games, those being the Cape Henry Bowl and Cape Charles Bowl as part of the Chesapeake Bowl Challenge. It features the teams from the Landmark Conference and the Old Dominion Athletic Conference that places highest in each conference's standings that don't qualify for the NCAA Division III playoffs. They have an overall record of 2–2.

Season	Coach	Bowl	Opponent	Result
2023	Garret LeRose	Cape Charles Bowl	Lycoming	L, 17–20
2024	Garret LeRose	Cape Henry Bowl	Wilkes	W, 40–21
2025	Garret LeRose	Cape Charles Bowl	Lycoming	W, 14–12
2026	Garret LeRose	Cape Charles Bowl	Wilkes	L, 7–21

== All-Americans ==
Year	Name	Position	Selectors
1914	Ted Shultz	T	PPL
1926	Ty Rauber	FB	AP-3
2024	Jalen Todd	LB	AP-3
