= 1913 Johns Hopkins Blue Jays football team =

American college football season

1913 Johns Hopkins Blue Jays football
- Conference: South Atlantic Intercollegiate Athletic Association
- Record: 3–4 (0–1 SAIAA)
- Head coach: John H. Gates (1st season)
- Home stadium: Homewood Field

1913 South Atlantic Intercollegiate Athletic Association football standings
	Conf.					Overall
Team	W		L		T	W		L		T
North Carolina A&M $	2	–	0	–	0	6	–	1	–	0
Washington and Lee	3	–	1	–	0	8	–	1	–	0
Virginia	1	–	1	–	0	7	–	1	–	0
VPI	1	–	1	–	0	7	–	1	–	1
Georgetown	1	–	1	–	0	4	–	4	–	0
Johns Hopkins	0	–	1	–	0	3	–	4	–	0
North Carolina	0	–	3	–	0	5	–	4	–	0
$ – Conference champion

The 1913 Johns Hopkins Blue Jays football team was an American football team that represented Johns Hopkins University during the 1913 college football season as a member of the South Atlantic Intercollegiate Athletic Association. In their first year under head coach John H. Gates, the team compiled an overall record of 3–4.

== Schedule ==
Date	Opponent	Site	Result	Source
October 11	Maryland*	Homewood Field; Baltimore, MD	L 0–26	
October 18	Washington and Lee	Homewood Field; Baltimore, MD	L 3–34	
October 25	at Stevens*	Castle Point; Hoboken, NJ	W 12–0	
November 1	Swarthmore*	Homewood Field; Baltimore, MD	L 7–10	
November 8	Carlisle*	Homewood Field; Baltimore, MD	L 0–61	
November 15	Western Maryland*	Homewood Field; Baltimore, MD	W 15–0	
November 27	St. John's (MD)*	Homewood Field; Baltimore, MD	W 14–3	
*Non-conference game
