= 1915 VPI Gobblers football team =

American college football season

1915 VPI Gobblers football
- Conference: South Atlantic Intercollegiate Athletic Association
- Record: 4–4 (0–1 SAIAA)
- Head coach: Branch Bocock (6th season)
- Captain: Vincent Bargmant Dixon
- Home stadium: Miles Field

1915 South Atlantic Intercollegiate Athletic Association football standings
| | Conf. | | | | | Overall |
| Team | W | | L | | T | W | | L | | T |
|---|---|---|---|---|---|---|---|---|---|---|
| Virginia + | 2 | – | 0 | – | 0 | 8 | – | 1 | – | 0 |
| Washington and Lee + | 2 | – | 0 | – | 0 | 6 | – | 1 | – | 1 |
| Georgetown + | 2 | – | 0 | – | 0 | 7 | – | 2 | – | 0 |
| Catholic University | 1 | – | 0 | – | 0 | 5 | – | 2 | – | 0 |
| Johns Hopkins | 1 | – | 0 | – | 0 | 1 | – | 0 | – | 0 |
| Richmond | 0 | – | 1 | – | 0 | 4 | – | 4 | – | 1 |
| VPI | 0 | – | 1 | – | 0 | 4 | – | 4 | – | 0 |
| North Carolina A&M | 0 | – | 2 | – | 0 | 3 | – | 3 | – | 1 |
| North Carolina | 0 | – | 2 | – | 0 | 4 | – | 3 | – | 1 |
+ – Conference co-champions

The 1915 VPI Gobblers football team represented Virginia Agricultural and Mechanical College and Polytechnic Institute in the 1915 college football season. The team was led by their head coach Branch Bocock and finished with a record of four wins and four losses (4–4).

== Schedule ==
| Date | Time | Opponent | Site | Result | Attendance | Source |
|---|---|---|---|---|---|---|
| September 25 | | Roanoke* | Miles Field; Blacksburg, VA | W 26–0 | | |
| October 2 | | Randolph–Macon* | Miles Field; Blacksburg, VA | W 20–3 | | |
| October 9 | | Hampden–Sydney* | Miles Field; Blacksburg, VA | W 19–0 | | |
| October 16 | | vs. Washington and Lee | Fair Grounds; Roanoke, VA | L 0–13 | 4,000 | |
| October 23 | | at Navy* | Worden Field; Annapolis, MD | L 0–20 | | |
| October 30 | | at Cornell* | Schoellkopf Field; Ithaca, NY | L 0–45 | | |
| November 13 | | at West Virginia* | WVU Athletic Field; Morgantown, WV (rivalry) | L 0–19 | | |
| November 25 | 2:30 p.m. | vs. VMI* | Fair Grounds; Roanoke, VA (rivalry) | W 27–9 | | |
*Non-conference game

== Before the season ==
The 1914 VPI Gobblers football team compiled a 6–2–1 record and were led by Branch Bocock in his fifth season as head coach.

== Game summaries ==
=== Roanoke ===
Roanoke vs. VPI

| Team | 1 | 2 | 3 | 4 | Total |
|---|---|---|---|---|---|
| Roanoke | 3 | 0 | 0 | 0 | 3 |
| • VPI | 7 | 7 | 6 | 6 | 26 |

- Date: September 25
- Location: Miles Field
  Blacksburg, VA
- Referee: Harlan Sanborn

VPI's first game of the season was a victory over Roanoke at Miles Field.

The starting lineup for VPI was: Cottrell (left end), Parrish (left tackle), A. B. Moore (left guard), Henderson (center), Treakle (right guard), Caffee (right tackle), A. P. Moore (right end), Terry (quarterback), Dixon (left halfback), Denny (right halfback), Redd (fullback).
The substitutes were: Benedict, Bopp, Clemmer, F. A. Engleby, J. T. Engleby, Funkhouser, Graves, Gregory, Hall, Howell, Huddle and Logan.

The starting lineup for Roanoke was: J. M. Davidson (left end), Rock Norman (left tackle), Joe Floyd Kinser (left guard), Daniel O'Flaherty (center), Joseph Roe (right guard), Sam Bonham (right tackle), Mercer Williams (right end), Douglas Bunting (quarterback), G. S. Hoffman (left halfback), Reid Duncan (right halfback), James Bonham (fullback). The substitutes were: J. W. Blue, W. M. Bowers, Flannigan, Andrew Groseclose and B. D. Painter.

=== Randolph–Macon ===
Randolph–Macon vs. VPI

| Team | 1 | 2 | 3 | 4 | Total |
|---|---|---|---|---|---|
| RM | 3 | 0 | 0 | 0 | 3 |
| • VPI | 0 | 7 | 7 | 6 | 20 |

- Date: October 2
- Location: Miles Field
  Blacksburg, VA
- Referee: Harlan Sanborn

After their victory over Roanoke, VPI played Randolph–Macon College at Miles Field.

The starting lineup for VPI was: Gregory (left end), Parrish (left tackle), A. B. Moore (left guard), Henderson (center), Benedict (right guard), Hall (right tackle), Huddle (right end), Terry (quarterback), Funkhouser (left halfback), Denny (right halfback), Treakle (fullback). The substitutes were: Dixon, J. T. Engleby, Graves, A. P. Moore, Powell and Redd.

The starting lineup for Randolph–Macon was: Patterson (left end), Hastings Hopkins (left tackle), Morton (left guard), Hudnall (center), Gilbert Bush (right guard), Robert Scott (right tackle), William Scott (right end), Lancaster (quarterback), Young (left halfback), Gates Richardson (right halfback), Ingham (fullback). The substitutes were: Bassett and Woodson.

=== Hampden–Sydney ===
Hampden–Sydney vs. VPI

| Team | 1 | 2 | 3 | 4 | Total |
|---|---|---|---|---|---|
| HS | 0 | 0 | 0 | 0 | 0 |
| • VPI | 0 | 0 | 19 | 0 | 19 |

- Date: October 9
- Location: Miles Field
  Blacksburg, VA
- Referee: Harlan Sanborn

The starting lineup for VPI was: Huddle (left end), Parrish (left tackle), A. B. Moore (left guard), Henderson (center), Bopp (right guard), Caffee (right tackle), A. P. Moore (right end), Funkhouser (quarterback), Denny (left halfback), Powell (right halfback), Treakle (fullback). The substitutes were: Clemmer, Cottrell, Dixon, Engleby, Gregory, Hall, Harvey, Logan, Redd and Terry.

The starting lineup for Hampden–Sydney was: Walter Aylor (left end), John Shackelford (left tackle), Royster Lyle (left guard), Robert Gillespie (center), Ernest Herzig (right guard), Hank Crisp (right tackle), F. G. Goolsby (right end), Charles Bugg (quarterback), Thomas Parrish (left halfback), Edgar Pendleton (right halfback), James Warren (fullback). The substitutes were: Peyton Palmore and Zimmerman.

=== Washington and Lee ===
Washington & Lee vs. VPI

| Team | 1 | 2 | 3 | 4 | Total |
|---|---|---|---|---|---|
| • W&L | 7 | 0 | 0 | 6 | 13 |
| VPI | 0 | 0 | 0 | 0 | 0 |

- Date: October 16
- Location: Roanoke, VA
- Game attendance: 4,000
- Referee: Paul Magoffin

The starting lineup for VPI was: Cottrell (left end), Bopp (left tackle), A. B. Moore (left guard), Henderson (center), Benedict (right guard), Caffee (right tackle), A. P. Moore (right end), Dixon (quarterback), Funkhouser (left halfback), Powell (right halfback), Redd (fullback). The substitutes were: Denny, Gregory, Hall, Huddle, Parrish and Treakle.

The starting lineup for Washington and Lee was: J. J. Izard (left end), Ted Shultz (left tackle), B. D. Bryan (left guard), Al Pierotti (center), F. M. Dingwall (right guard), Robert Ignico (right tackle), John Harrison (right end), Harry "Cy" Young (quarterback), Johnny Barrett (left halfback), Fred Sweetland (right halfback), J. H. Sorrells (fullback). The substitutes were: Lawrence Bagley, Turner Bethel and S. M. Graham.

=== Navy ===
VPI at Navy

| Team | 1 | 2 | 3 | 4 | Total |
|---|---|---|---|---|---|
| VPI | 0 | 0 | 0 | 0 | 0 |
| • Navy | 0 | 6 | 13 | 1 | 20 |

- Date: October 23
- Location: Worden Field
  Annapolis, MD
- Referee: Tom Thorp

The starting lineup for VPI was: Gregory (left end), Benedict (left tackle), A. B. Moore (left guard), Henderson (center), Parrish (right guard), Caffee (right tackle), Hall (right end), Dixon (quarterback), Funkhouser (left halfback), Powell (right halfback), Redd (fullback). The substitutes were: Denny and Huddle.

The starting lineup for Navy was: Jesse Kenworthy (left end), Clarence Ward (left tackle), Merrill Kercher (left guard), H. Goodstein (center), Eugene Smith (right guard), Arthur Gilman (right tackle), Thomas Harrison (right end), Arthur Miles (quarterback), Frederick Westphall (left halfback), Harold Martin (right halfback), Ernest Von Heimburg (fullback). The substitutes were: Clark, Carlyle Craig, Robert Dashiell, Ward Davis, Thomas Fisher, Benjamin Holcombe, W. C. Luth and Louis Vail.

=== Cornell ===
VPI at Cornell

| Team | 1 | 2 | 3 | 4 | Total |
|---|---|---|---|---|---|
| VPI | 0 | 0 | 0 | 0 | 0 |
| • Cornell | 14 | 13 | 12 | 6 | 45 |

- Date: October 30
- Location: Schoellkopf Field
  Ithaca, NY
- Referee: Gillender
  (Pennsylvania)

The starting lineup for VPI was: Cottrell (left end), Benedict (left tackle), Bopp (left guard), A. B. Moore (center), Treakle (right guard), Parrish (right tackle), Hall (right end), Terry (quarterback), Engleby (left halfback), Powell (right halfback), Redd (fullback). The substitutes were: Dixon, Gray, Gregory, Henderson, Lybrook and A. P. Moore.

The starting lineup for Cornell was: Murray Shelton (left end), William Jameson (left tackle), Peter Miller (left guard), Gib Cool (center), Edward Anderson (right guard), Fred Gillies (right tackle), Paul Eckley (right end), Charley Barrett (quarterback), Carlton Collins (left halfback), Fritz Shiverick (right halfback), Lucien Mueller (fullback). The substitutes were: George Bard, Horace Benedict, Wiser Brown, Carey, Wesley Dixon, Fisher, Arthur Hoffman, Rexford Jewett, Edwin Kleinert, John Lewis, Masson, McCormick, John McKeage, Robert Ryerson, Fred P. Schlichter, Arthur Shock, Herbert Snyder and Roy Zander.

=== Cancelled Game with King College ===
VPI was scheduled to play King College on November 6 in Blacksburg, Virginia.

=== West Virginia ===
VPI at West Virginia

| Team | 1 | 2 | Total |
|---|---|---|---|
| VPI | 0 | 0 | 0 |
| • WVU | 19 | 0 | 19 |

- Date: November 13
- Location: Morgantown, WV
- Referee: Jack Gass

The starting lineup for VPI was: Huddle (left end), Benedict (left tackle), A. P. Moore (left guard), A. B. Moore (center), Bopp (right guard), Parrish (right tackle), Hall (right end), Terry (quarterback), Dixon (left halfback), Powell (right halfback), Redd (fullback). The substitutes were: Cottrell, Engleby and Henderson.

The starting lineup for West Virginia was: Harold Hutchinson (left end), Russ Bailey (left tackle), Howard Henrie (left guard), Oscar Lambert (center), Dorsey Brannon (right guard), J. Burns Webster (right tackle), Jasper Colebank (right end), Fred Chenoweth (quarterback), Clay Hite (left halfback), Harry Curry (right halfback), Rip King (fullback). The substitutes were: Glenn Allen, Victor Biddle, William Dougher, Jack Latterner, Carl Leatherwood and G. Andrew Northcott.

=== VMI ===
VMI vs. VPI

| Team | 1 | 2 | 3 | 4 | Total |
|---|---|---|---|---|---|
| VMI | 0 | 0 | 3 | 6 | 9 |
| • VPI | 10 | 10 | 0 | 7 | 27 |

- Date: November 25
- Location: Fair Grounds
  Roanoke, VA
- Game start: 2:30 p.m.
- Referee: Langford
  (Trinity)

The starting lineup for VPI was: Gregory (left end), Benedict (left tackle), A. P. Moore (left guard), A. B. Moore (center), Bopp (right guard), Parrish (right tackle), Gaines (right end), Funkhouser (quarterback), Huddle (left halfback), Powell (right halfback), Redd (fullback). The substitutes were: Caffee, Dixon, Engleby, Hall and Henderson.

The starting lineup for VMI was: Mose Goodman (left end), Matthew Steele (left tackle), John Pitts (left guard), George Snead (center), Sterling Heflin (right guard), Cullom (right tackle), Nathaniel Massie (right end), Stanton Bertschey (quarterback), James Nelms (left halfback), Carlos Fetterolf (right halfback), Harris (fullback). The substitutes were: Ayers, Oliver Bucher, John Fechheimer, Gray, Hawkins, Peyton Marshall, Mason, McCormick, McCown, Paul, Lindsay Pitts and Sullivan.

== After the season ==
In December 1915, the VPI players elected John Staub Caffee as captain of the 1916 VPI Gobblers football team.

== Players ==
=== Roster ===
VPI 1915 roster
| Quarterbacks: Joseph Thomas Engleby; Edward Kramer Funkhouser; Arthur Palfrey Terry; Guards: Arthur Penick Moore; George Ellsworth Treakle; Tackles: Loyal Clark Benedict; Harry Joe Bopp; John Staub Caffee; Harry Temple Parrish | Centers: Robert Ashby Henderson; Arthur Blakie Moore; Ends: Benjamin Cottrell; James Atkins Gregory; Lyle George Hall; Halfbacks: Vincent Bargmant Dixon (Capt.); Robert Evans Denny; David Nicholas Huddle; James Franklin Powell; Fullback: Henry Redd | Substitutes: Thomas Franklin Clemmer; Allen Ernest Cloyd; Frederick Dean; Frank Allison Engleby; Leonard Myrton Gaines; Turner Ashby Graves; Francis Alexander Gray; Richard Harvey; Percy Stuart Hayden; Russell Minor Howell; Charles Lewter Logan; William Murry Lybrook; Harry Douglas Roden; Henry Luck Rosenbaum; John Lee Thompson; Walter Lee Turner; Charles Evans Whitmore; W. R. Williams |

=== Monogram Club members ===
Eighteen players received monograms for their participation on the 1915 VPI team.

| Player | Hometown | Notes |
|---|---|---|
| Loyal Clark Benedict | Farmville, Virginia | |
| Harry Joe Bopp | Pulaski, Virginia | |
| John Staub Caffee | Norfolk, Virginia | |
| Benjamin Cottrell | Richmond, Virginia | |
| Robert Evans Denny | | |
| Vincent Bargmant Dixon | Phoebus, Virginia | |
| Edward Kramer Funkhouser | Harrisonburg, Virginia | |
| James Atkins Gregory | Chase City, Virginia | |
| Lysle George Hall | Charlottesville, Virginia | |
| Robert Ashby Henderson | | |
| David Nicholas Huddle | | |
| Arthur Blakie Moore | Buchanan, Virginia | Fought in World War I and was killed during the Meuse–Argonne offensive. |
| Arthur Penick Moore | Ringgold, Virginia | |
| Harry Temple Parrish | Bristol, Virginia | |
| James Franklin Powell | Hampton, Virginia | |
| Henry Redd | Martinsville, Virginia | |
| Arthur Palfrey Terry | | |
| George Ellsworth Treakle | | |

== Coaching and training staff ==
- Head coach: Branch Bocock
- Assistant coach: Donald Munsick
- Manager: William Louis Cogbill, Jr.
- Assistant managers
  - Walton Marshall Ellingsworth
  - John Howell East
  - Paxton Stuart Campbell
