= Heman L. Dowd =

American football player and coach (1887–1968)

Heman Dowd
Biographical details
- Born: November 28, 1887; Orange, New Jersey, U.S.
- Died: June 4, 1968 (aged 80); New York, New York, U.S.

Playing career
- 1906–1908: Princeton

Coaching career (HC unless noted)
- 1909: Princeton (freshmen)
- 1910: Stevens
- 1913: Washington and Lee

Head coaching record
- Overall: 10–6–1

Accomplishments and honors

Championships
- National (1906)

Heman Laurence Dowd (November 28, 1887 – June 4, 1968) was an American college football player and coach. He served as the head football coach at Stevens Institute of Technology in 1910 and Washington and Lee University in 1913, compiling a career college football coaching record of 10–6–1.

Dowd was born on November 28, 1887, in Orange, New Jersey. He graduated from the Columbia University College of Physicians and Surgeons in 1913 and subsequently worked as a medical intern as St. Luke's Hospital and St. Mary's Free Hospital for Children. He married Alice Richard on May 24, 1917, at Saint Thomas Church in Manhattan.

Dowd died of a heart attack on June 4, 1968, in New York City.

== Head coaching record ==
| Year | Team | Overall | Conference | Standing | Bowl/playoffs |
|---|---|---|---|---|---|
Stevens (Independent) (1910)
| 1910 | Stevens | 2–5–1 | | | |
| Stevens: | | 2–5–1 | | | |
Washington and Lee Generals (South Atlantic Intercollegiate Athletic Association) (1913)
| 1913 | Washington and Lee | 8–1 | 3–1 | 2nd | |
| Washington and Lee: | | 8–1 | 3–1 | | |
| Total: | | 10–6–1 | | | |
