= William Quigley (coach) =

American football player and coach (1892–1942)

Biographical details
- Born: August 1, 1892; Beverly, Massachusetts, U.S.
- Died: March 24, 1942 (aged 49); Pasadena, California, U.S.

Playing career
- 1914–1917: Penn
- Position: Fullback

Coaching career (HC unless noted)
- 1919: Saint Joseph's
- 1921–1923: George Washington

William Andrew Quigley (August 1, 1892 – March 24, 1942) was an American college football player and coach and founder of the Del Mar racetrack.

Quigley was captain and fullback of the University of Pennsylvania football team in 1916. He served as the head football coach at George Washington University in Washington, D.C. from 1921 to 1923.

After his football career, Quigley became a successful stockbroker and settled in La Jolla, California. There he formed the idea of establishing a horse racetrack on the Del Mar Fairgrounds, inspired by the success of the Santa Anita Park racetrack in Arcadia, California that opened on Christmas 1934. He subsequently won over Bing Crosby and on May 6, 1936, Quigley and Crosby filed for articles of incorporation with California and founded the Del Mar Turf Club. Quigley became the original General Manager / Director of Racing of the Del Mar racetrack, which opened on July 3, 1937. Quigley was still vice president and general manager of the Del Mar Turf Club when he died at the age of 49 in Pasadena. He is interred at the Waterside Cemetery in Marblehead, Massachusetts near his birthplace.

== Head coaching record ==
Year	Team	Overall	Conference	Standing	Bowl/playoffs
George Washington Hatchetites (South Atlantic Intercollegiate Athletic Association) (1921)
1921	George Washington	3–3–2	0–3–1	16th	
George Washington Hatchetites (Independent) (1922–1923)
1922	George Washington	2–6			
1923	George Washington	2–8			
George Washington:		4–14			
Total:		7–17–2			
