= Bill Fetzer =

American athlete and coach (1884–1959)

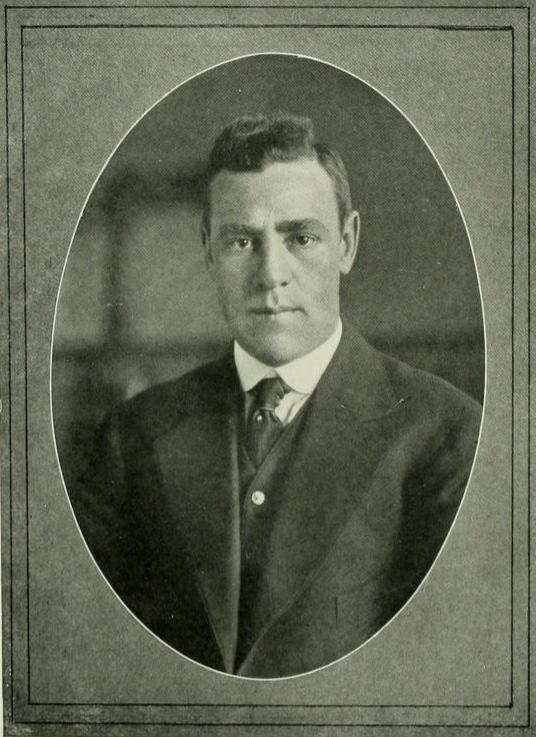
- Pictured in Quips and Cranks 1917, Davidson yearbook

Biographical details
- Born: June 24, 1884; Concord, North Carolina, U.S.
- Died: May 3, 1959 (aged 74); Franklin, North Carolina, U.S.

Playing career

Baseball
- 1905–1906: Davidson

Coaching career (HC unless noted)

Football
- 1915–1918: Davidson
- 1919–1920: NC State
- 1921–1925: North Carolina

Basketball
- 1916–1918: Davidson

Baseball
- 1915–1919: Davidson
- 1920: NC State
- 1921–1925: North Carolina

Head coaching record
- Overall: 61–28–7 (football); 18–11 (basketball); 128–75–5 (baseball)

Accomplishments and honors

Championships
- Football; 1 SoCon (1922)

William McKinnon Fetzer (June 24, 1884 – May 3, 1959) was an American football, basketball, and baseball coach. He served as the head football coach at Davidson College (1915–1918), North Carolina State University (1919–1920), and the University of North Carolina at Chapel Hill (1921–1925), compiling a career college football record of 61–28–7. His brother, Bob Fetzer, served as co-head football coach at the University of North Carolina and later became the first and longest serving Athletics Director for the university. Fetzer also was the head basketball coach at Davidson for two seasons, from 1916 to 1918, tallying a mark of 18–11. In addition, he coached baseball at Davidson (1915–1919), NC State (1920), and North Carolina (1921–1925), amassing a career college baseball record of 128–75–5.

== Baseball career ==
Fetzer was also a professional baseball player. He made his Major League Baseball (MLB) debut on September 4, 1906, as a pinch hitter for the Philadelphia Athletics. In his lone at bat Fetzer failed to record a hit. This would be his only major league game, although he continued to play in the minor leagues, primarily as an outfielder, until 1910. He threw with his left hand and hit with his right. Prior to his professional career, Fetzer played collegiately at Davidson College.

== Head coaching record ==
=== Football ===
Year	Team	Overall	Conference	Standing	Bowl/playoffs
Davidson (Independent) (1915)
1915	Davidson	4–3–1			
Davidson Wildcats (South Atlantic Intercollegiate Athletic Association) (1916–1918)
1916	Davidson	5–3–1	1–2	8th	
1917	Davidson	6–4	1–2	7th	
1918	Davidson	2–1–1	2–0	2nd	
Davidson:		17–11–3	4–4		
NC State Aggies (South Atlantic Intercollegiate Athletic Association) (1919–1920)
1919	NC State	7–2	3–1	T–3rd	
1920	NC State	7–3	4–2	6th	
NC State:		14–5	7–3		
North Carolina Tar Heels (Southern Conference) (1921–1925)
1921	North Carolina	5–2–2	2–1	5th	
1922	North Carolina	9–1	5–0	T–1st	
1923	North Carolina	5–3–1	2–1–1	8th	
1924	North Carolina	4–5	2–3	T–14th	
1925	North Carolina	7–1–1	4–0–1	3rd	
North Carolina:		30–12–4	22–8–2		
Total:		61–28–7			
