= Harry Varner =

American football player and coach (1885–1970)

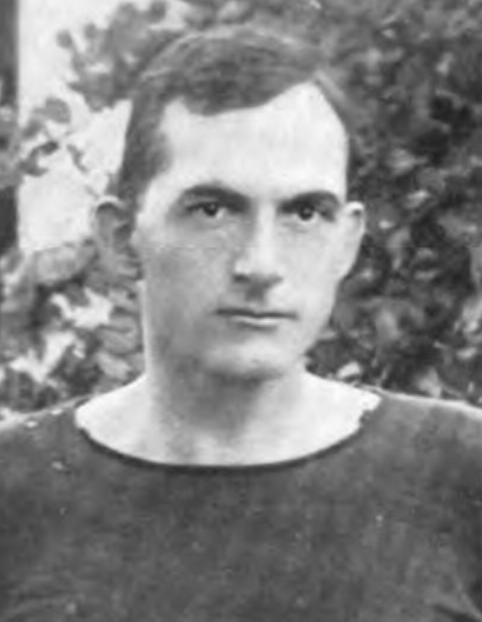
- Varner pictured in Corks and Curls 1916, Virginia yearbook

Biographical details
- Born: December 18, 1885; Warrenton, Virginia, U.S.
- Died: November 3, 1970 (aged 84); El Paso, Texas, U.S.

Playing career
- 1906: VPI

Coaching career (HC unless noted)
- 1915: Virginia

Head coaching record
- Overall: 8–1

Harry Howard Varner (December 18, 1885 – November 3, 1970) was an American football coach. He served as the head football coach at the University of Virginia for one season in 1915, compiling a record of 8–1. Varner was born in Warrenton, Virginia in 1885. He later worked as a surgeon in El Paso, Texas. He died there after suffering from prostate cancer in 1970.

== Head coaching record ==
Year	Team	Overall	Conference	Standing	Bowl/playoffs
Virginia Virginia Orange and Blue (South Atlantic Intercollegiate Athletic Association) (1915)
1915	Virginia	8–1	2–0	T–1st	
Virginia:		8–1	2–0		
Total:		8–1			
National championship Conference title Conference division title or championship game berth
