= W. Rice Warren =

American football player and sports coach (1885–1969)

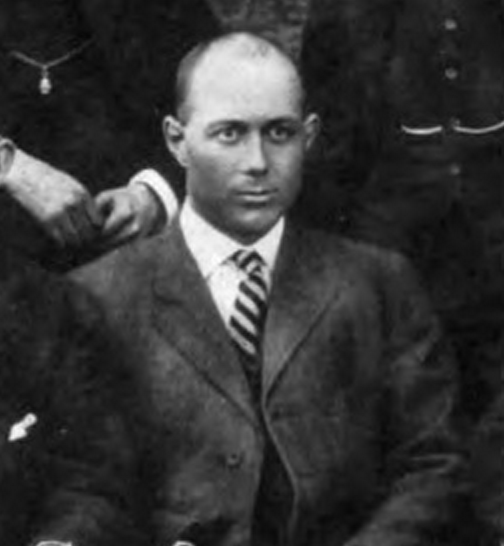
- Warren pictured in Corks and Curls 1915, Virginia yearbook

Biographical details
- Born: December 22, 1885; Harrisonburg, Virginia, U.S.
- Died: November 17, 1969 (aged 83); Orange County, Virginia, U.S.

Playing career

Football
- 1904–1905: Virginia
- Position: End

Coaching career (HC unless noted)

Football
- 1907–1911: Randolph–Macon
- 1912: Virginia (assistant)
- 1913: Virginia
- 1916: South Carolina
- 1920–1921: Virginia

Baseball
- 1921: Virginia

Administrative career (AD unless noted)
- 1907–1912: Randolph–Macon
- 1922–1923: Randolph–Macon

Head coaching record
- Overall: 41–28–5; 7–15 (baseball)

Accomplishments and honors

Championships
- 3 EVIAA (1908, 1910–1911)

William Rice Warren (December 22, 1885 – November 17, 1969) was an American football player and coach of football and baseball. He served as the head football coach at Randolph–Macon College from 1907 to 1911, the University of Virginia in 1913, 1920 and 1921 and the University of South Carolina in 1916, compiling a college football coaching record of 41–28–5. Warren was also the head baseball coach at Virginia for one season in 1921, tallying a mark of 7–15. In addition he was professor of physical training circa 1920 at the university. Warren later worked as a physician, having obtained his medical degree from the University of Virginia. He died in 1969 in Orange County, Virginia.

== Head coaching record ==
=== Football ===
Year	Team	Overall	Conference	Standing	Bowl/playoffs
Randolph–Macon Yellow Jackets (Eastern Virginia Intercollegiate Athletic Association) (1907–1911)
1907	Randolph–Macon	4–4			
1908	Randolph–Macon	6–2	2–1	T–1st	
1909	Randolph–Macon	3–2–2	2–1		
1910	Randolph–Macon	4–4	3–0	1st	
1911	Randolph–Macon	5–2–1	3–0	1st	
Randolph–Macon:		22–14–3			
Virginia Orange and Blue (South Atlantic Intercollegiate Athletic Association) (1913)
1913	Virginia	7–1	1–1	T–3rd	
South Carolina Gamecocks (Southern Intercollegiate Athletic Association) (1916)
1916	South Carolina	2–7	2–4		
South Carolina:		2–7	2–4		
Virginia Orange and Blue (South Atlantic Intercollegiate Athletic Association) (1920–1921)
1920	Virginia	5–2–2	3–1	T–4th	
1921	Virginia	5–4	5–1	3rd	
Virginia:		17–7–2	9–3		
Total:		41–28–5			
National championship Conference title Conference division title or championship game berth
