= 1913 VPI Gobblers football team =

American college football season

1913 VPI Gobblers football
- Conference: South Atlantic Intercollegiate Athletic Association
- Record: 7–1–1 (1–1 SAIAA)
- Head coach: Branch Bocock (4th season)
- Captain: Lewis A. Pick
- Home stadium: Miles Field

1913 South Atlantic Intercollegiate Athletic Association football standings
	Conf.					Overall
Team	W		L		T	W		L		T
North Carolina A&M $	2	–	0	–	0	6	–	1	–	0
Washington and Lee	3	–	1	–	0	8	–	1	–	0
Virginia	1	–	1	–	0	7	–	1	–	0
VPI	1	–	1	–	0	7	–	1	–	1
Georgetown	1	–	1	–	0	4	–	4	–	0
Johns Hopkins	0	–	1	–	0	3	–	4	–	0
North Carolina	0	–	3	–	0	5	–	4	–	0
$ – Conference champion

The 1913 VPI Gobblers football team represented Virginia Agricultural and Mechanical College and Polytechnic Institute in the 1913 college football season. The team was led by their head coach Branch Bocock and finished with a record of seven wins, one loss and one tie (7–1–1).

== Schedule ==
Date	Time	Opponent	Site	Result	Attendance	Source
September 27		Roanoke*	Miles Field; Blacksburg, VA	W 26–0		
October 4		Hampden–Sydney*	Miles Field; Blacksburg, VA	W 14–0		
October 11		Ole Miss*	Miles Field; Blacksburg, VA	W 35–14		
October 18		VPI Stars*	Miles Field; Blacksburg, VA	W 12–2		
October 25		vs. North Carolina	Prince Albert Park; Winston-Salem, NC	W 14–7		
November 1	3:00 p.m.	vs. Washington and Lee	Fair Grounds; Roanoke, VA	L 0–21	6,000-7,000	
November 8		Marshall*	Miles Field; Blacksburg, VA	W 47–0		
November 15		Morris Harvey*	Miles Field; Blacksburg, VA	W 14–0		
November 27	3:00 p.m.	vs. VMI*	Fair Grounds; Roanoke, VA (rivalry)	T 6–6		
*Non-conference game

== Before the season ==
The 1912 VPI Gobblers football team compiled a 5–4 record and were led by Branch Bocock in his third season as head coach.

== Game summaries ==
=== Roanoke ===
VPI's first game of the season was a victory over Roanoke at Miles Field.

=== Hampden–Sydney ===
After their victory over Roanoke, VPI played Hampden–Sydney College at Miles Field.

The starting lineup for VPI was: Taylor (left end), Pick (left tackle), Graves (left guard), Clemmer (center), Whitehead (right guard), Caffee (right tackle), Rives (right end), Dixon (quarterback), Parrish (left halfback), Legge (right halfback), Sanders (fullback). The substitutes were: Bright, Effinger, Moore, Peake and Rowe.

The starting lineup for Hampden–Sydney was: J. A. Gregory (left end), C. M. Walker (left tackle), Robert Guthrie (left guard), Marvin Bowling (center), S. B. Forbus (right guard), Loyal Benedict (right tackle), Frank Ebel (right end), Alexander Carrington (quarterback), W. L. Thurmond (left halfback), E. B. Pendleton (right halfback), H. S. Campbell (fullback).

=== Old Miss ===
The starting lineup for VPI was: Taylor (left end), Pick (left tackle), Graves (left guard), Clemmer (center), Whitehead (right guard), Caffee (right tackle), Rives (right end), Dixon (quarterback), Parrish (left halfback), Legge (right halfback), Sanders (fullback).

The starting lineup for Old Miss was: Frank Smythe (left end), Ralph Mills (left tackle), Jerome James (left guard), McCall (center), Clinton Dorroh (right guard), Smith Bishop (right tackle), Williams (right end), Joseph Evans (quarterback), Walter Dear (left halfback), Jesse Breland (right halfback), Charles Bender (fullback).

=== North Carolina ===
North Carolina vs. VPI

Team	1	2	3	4	Total
UNC	0	0	0	7	7
• VPI	0	14	0	0	14

- Date: October 25, 1913
- Location: Prince Albert Park
  Winston-Salem, NC
- Referee: Neilson (Nebraska)

The starting lineup for VPI was: Taylor (left end), Pick (left tackle), Whitehead (left guard), Clemmer (center), Graves (right guard), Caffee (right tackle), Rives (right end), Dixon (quarterback), Davis (left halfback), Legge (right halfback), Sanders (fullback).

The starting lineup for North Carolina was: Joyner (left end), Ramsey (left tackle), Cowell (left guard), Yank Tandy (center), Foust (right guard), Abernathy (right tackle), Roy Homewood (right end), Allen (quarterback), Dave Tayloe (left halfback), Fuller (right halfback), Ervin (fullback). The substitutes were: Cary Boshamer, Burnette, William Huske, Oates and Reid.

=== Washington and Lee ===
Washington & Lee vs. VPI

Team	1	2	3	4	Total
• W&L	7	7	0	7	21
VPI	0	0	0	0	0

- Date: November 1, 1913
- Location: Fair Grounds
  Roanoke, VA
- Game start: 3:00 p.m.
- Game attendance: 6,000-7,000
- Game weather: "ideal"
- Referee: Pat Berry

The starting lineup for VPI was: Moore (left end), Pick (left tackle), Whitehead (left guard), Clemmer (center), Graves (right guard), Caffee (right tackle), Taylor (right end), Peake (quarterback), Parrish (left halfback), Legge (right halfback), Sanders (fullback). The substitutes were: Davis, Dixon, Effinger, Harris, MacRuth, Montague and Rives.

The starting lineup for Washington and Lee was: Henry Barker (left end), Ted Shultz (left tackle), James Miller (left guard), M. S. Barrow (center), W. H. Neblett (right guard), Buck Miles (right tackle), J. P. Hieatt (right end), Edward Donahue (quarterback), Harry "Cy" Young (left halfback), Charles Lile (right halfback), Raymond Beuhring (fullback). The substitutes were: F. M. Dingwall, Victor Friend, Kirkpatrick, Joseph Milner, Frank Nolley, W. K. Seeley, William Smith and Walter Terry.

=== Morris Harvey ===
Morris Harvey vs. VPI

Team	1	2	3	4	Total
MH	0	0	0	0	0
• VPI	0	7	7	0	14

- Date: November 15, 1913
- Location: Miles Field
  Blacksburg, VA
- Referee: Miles

The starting lineup for VPI was: Moore (left end), Pick (left tackle), Graves (left guard), Clemmer (center), Whitehead (right guard), Caffee (right tackle), Cottrell (right end), Dixon (quarterback), Legge (left halfback), Davis (right halfback), Sanders (fullback).

The starting lineup for Morris Harvey was: Osborne (left end), Calvert (left tackle), Watt Stewart (left guard), C. Coon (center), Poe Coffman (right guard), Taylor (right tackle), Bolden (right end), Elbert Fulton (quarterback), F. B. Legge (left halfback), Turner (right halfback), Snodgrass (fullback).

=== VMI ===
VMI vs. VPI

Team	1	2	3	4	Total
VMI	0	0	6	0	6
VPI	0	0	0	6	6

- Date: November 27, 1913
- Location: Fair Grounds
  Roanoke, VA
- Game start: 3:00 p.m.
- Game weather: "ideal"
- Referee: Land (Navy)

The starting lineup for VPI was: Taylor (left end), Pick (left tackle), Graves (left guard), Effinger (center), Whitehead (right guard), Caffee (right tackle), Moore (right end), Dixon (quarterback), Legge (left halfback), Engleby (right halfback), Sanders (fullback). The substitutes were: Clemmer, Cottrell, Davis, McRuth, Parrish, Peake and Rives.

The starting lineup for VMI was: S. L. Lowry (left end), Rice Youell (left tackle), Vernon Somers (left guard), Oscar Beasley (center), Claude Cammer (right guard), Blandy Clarkson (right tackle), James Richards (right end), W. B. Lowry (quarterback), Harold Hutchinson (left halfback), James Bain (right halfback), Laurence Oakes (fullback). The substitutes were: Withers Burress.

== Players ==
The following players were members of the 1913 football team according to the roster published in the 1914 edition of The Bugle, the Virginia Tech yearbook.

VPI 1913 roster
Quarterbacks: Vincent Bargmant Dixon; Millard Fillmore Peake; Guards: Turner Ashby Graves; W. A. Harris; Thomas M. Whitehead; Tackles: John Staub Caffee; Lewis A. Pick (Capt.); Centers: Thomas Franklin Clemmer; William Franklin Effinger	Ends: Arthur Blakie Moore; Thomas McDowell Rives; Franklin Minor Taylor; Halfbacks: Withrow Reynolds Legge; David Walker Parrish; Fullback: Harry Warriner Sanders	Substitutes: W. J. Bright; Benjamin Cottrell; Roland Legard Davis; Frank Allison Engleby; H. C. MacRuth; Montague; Arthur Penick Moore; Thomas Jefferson Rowe

== Coaching and training staff ==
- Head coach: Branch Bocock
- Manager: Frank Richardson Scott
