= R. V. Lowe =

American football player (1897–1951)

Profile
- Position: Back

Personal information
- Born: October 10, 1897; Kansas, U.S.
- Died: March 7, 1951 (aged 53); Pasadena, California, U.S.
- Listed height: 5 ft 11 in (1.80 m)
- Listed weight: 180 lb (82 kg)

Career information
- High school: Hutchinson (Hutchinson, Kansas)
- College: Dubuque, Georgetown

Career history
- Rock Island Independents (1923)

Career statistics
- Games: 5
- Stats at Pro Football Reference

Ramon Vere Lowe (October 10, 1897 – March 7, 1951), often referred to as "R. V. Lowe", sometimes identified as "Walter" or "Bulldog", was an American football player.

Lowe was born in 1897 in Kansas and attended high school in Hutchinson, Kansas. He served in the U.S. Army during World War I and played college football at Dubuque in 1917 and 1918 and at Georgetown in 1921. He was described as "one of the outstanding stars" of the 1921 Georgetown Blue and Gray football team that compiled an 8–1 record under coach Albert Exendine. He was described as "a whirlwind in the open field and a snapping turtle at gobbling passes"

Lowe also played professional football in the National Football League (NFL) as a back for the Rock Island Independents. He appeared in five NFL games, one as a starter, during the 1923 season.

Lowe and his wife, Lillian, had two sons (Raymond and Donald) and a daughter (Mary Elle). He died in 1951 in Pasadena, California, at age 52.
