= 1915 North Carolina Tar Heels football team =

American college football season

1915 North Carolina Tar Heels football
- Conference: South Atlantic Intercollegiate Athletic Association
- Record: 4–3–1 (0–2 SAIAA)
- Head coach: Thomas Trenchard (4th season)
- Captain: Dave Tayloe
- Home stadium: Class Field

1915 South Atlantic Intercollegiate Athletic Association football standings
	Conf.					Overall
Team	W		L		T	W		L		T
Virginia +	2	–	0	–	0	8	–	1	–	0
Washington and Lee +	2	–	0	–	0	6	–	1	–	1
Georgetown +	2	–	0	–	0	7	–	2	–	0
Catholic University	1	–	0	–	0	5	–	2	–	0
Johns Hopkins	1	–	0	–	0	1	–	0	–	0
Richmond	0	–	1	–	0	4	–	4	–	1
VPI	0	–	1	–	0	4	–	4	–	0
North Carolina A&M	0	–	2	–	0	3	–	3	–	1
North Carolina	0	–	2	–	0	4	–	3	–	1
+ – Conference co-champions

The 1915 North Carolina Tar Heels football team was an American football team that represented the University of North Carolina in the 1915 college football season. The team compiled a 4–3–1 record and outscored its opponents by a combined total of 105 to 98.

== Schedule ==
Date	Time	Opponent	Site	Result	Attendance	Source
October 2		The Citadel	Class Field; Chapel Hill, NC	W 14–7		
October 9		Wake Forest	Class Field; Chapel Hill, NC (rivalry)	W 35–0		
October 16	3:00 p.m.	at Georgetown	Georgetown Field; Washington, DC	L 0–38		
October 23	3:00 p.m.	vs. VMI	Cone Athletic Park (II); Greensboro, NC	T 3–3		
October 30	2:30 p.m.	at Georgia Tech	Grant Field; Atlanta, GA	L 3–23		
November 6	3:00 p.m.	vs. Clemson	Augusta Street Park; Greenville, SC	W 9–7	2,000	
November 13	3:00 p.m.	vs. Davidson	Prince Albert Park; Winston-Salem, NC	W 41–6		
November 25	2:35 p.m.	vs. Virginia	Broad Street Park (II); Richmond, VA (rivalry)	L 0–14	13,000	
