= B. C. Cubbage =

American football player and athletics coach

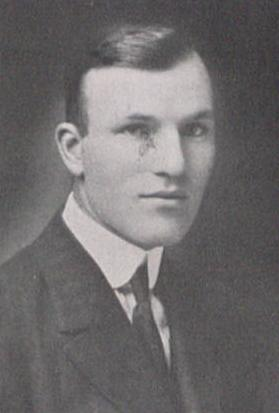
- Cubbage pictured in La Vie 1918, Penn State yearbook

Biographical details
- Born: October 1, 1895; Philadelphia, Pennsylvania, U.S.
- Died: May 7, 1961 (aged 65); Birmingham, Alabama, U.S.

Playing career

Football
- 1916, 1919: Penn State
- 1919: Massillon Tigers
- Positions: End, guard, tackle

Coaching career (HC unless noted)

Football
- 1921–1925: VPI
- 1926–1929: Sewanee (assistant)

Basketball
- 1923–1924: VPI

Head coaching record
- Overall: 30–12–6 (football); 5–13 (basketball)

Benjamin Cook Cubbage (October 1, 1895 – May 7, 1961) was an American football player and coach of football and basketball. He served as the head football coach Virginia Agricultural and Mechanical College and Polytechnic Institute (VPI)—now known as Virginia Tech—from 1921 to 1925, compiled a record of 30–12–6. Cubbage was also the head basketball coach at VPI for one season, in 1923–24, tallying a mark of 5–13.

After graduating from Central High School in Philadelphia, Cubbage played college football at Pennsylvania State University as an end and tackle. He played professionally as a guard for the Massillon Tigers of the "Ohio League" during the team's 1919 season.

== Head coaching record ==
=== Football ===
Year	Team	Overall	Conference	Standing	Bowl/playoffs
VPI Gobblers (South Atlantic Intercollegiate Athletic Association) (1921)
1921	VPI	7–3	3–2	6th	
VPI Gobblers (Southern Conference) (1922–1925)
1922	VPI	8–1–1	3–0	4th	
1923	VPI	6–3	4–2	T–5th	
1924	VPI	4–2–3	2–2–3	T–11th	
1925	VPI	5–3–2	3–3–1	T–10th	
VPI:		30–12–6	15–9–4		
Total:		30–12–6			
