= 1921 VMI Keydets football team =

American college football season

1921 VMI Keydets football
- Conference: South Atlantic Intercollegiate Athletic Association
- Record: 3–5–1 (0–3–1 SAIAA)
- Head coach: Blandy Clarkson (2nd season)
- Home stadium: Alumni Field

1921 South Atlantic Intercollegiate Athletic Association football standings
	Conf.					Overall
Team	W		L		T	W		L		T
Washington and Lee $	2	–	0	–	0	6	–	3	–	0
Georgetown	1	–	0	–	0	8	–	1	–	0
Virginia	5	–	1	–	0	5	–	4	–	0
North Carolina	3	–	1	–	1	5	–	2	–	2
VPI	4	–	2	–	0	7	–	3	–	0
Maryland	2	–	1	–	1	3	–	5	–	1
Richmond	2	–	2	–	1	4	–	3	–	1
Catholic University	2	–	2	–	0	3	–	5	–	0
NC State	1	–	1	–	3	3	–	3	–	3
William & Mary	1	–	3	–	1	4	–	3	–	1
Trinity (NC)	0	–	1	–	0	6	–	1	–	2
Davidson	0	–	1	–	3	3	–	4	–	3
Johns Hopkins	0	–	2	–	0	6	–	3	–	0
VMI	0	–	3	–	1	3	–	5	–	1
George Washington	0	–	3	–	1	3	–	3	–	2
$ – Conference champion

The 1921 VMI Keydets football team was an American football team that represented the Virginia Military Institute (VMI) during the 1921 college football season as a member of the South Atlantic Intercollegiate Athletic Association. In their second year under head coach Blandy Clarkson, the team compiled an overall record of 3–5–1.

== Schedule ==
Date	Opponent	Site	Result	Attendance	Source
September 24	Roanoke*	Alumni Field; Lexington, VA	W 13–0		
October 1	Hampden–Sydney*	Alumni Field; Lexington, VA	W 32–0		
October 8	Wake Forest*	Alumni Field; Lexington, VA	W 20–0		
October 15	Virginia	Alumni Field; Lexington, VA	L 7–14		
October 22	at Penn*	Franklin Field; Philadelphia, PA	L 7–21	22,000	
October 29	at NC State	Riddick Stadium; Raleigh, NC	T 7–7		
November 5	vs. North Carolina	Mayo Island Park; Richmond, VA	L 7–20		
November 12	at Kentucky*	Eclipse Park; Louisville, KY	L 7–14		
November 24	vs. VPI	Fair Grounds; Roanoke, VA (rivalry)	L 7–26		
*Non-conference game
