= 1915 Richmond Spiders football team =

American college football season

1915 Richmond Spiders football
- Conference: Eastern Virginia Intercollegiate Athletic Association, South Atlantic Intercollegiate Athletic Association
- Record: 4–4–1 (3–2–1 EVIAA, 0–1 SAIAA)
- Head coach: Frank Dobson (3rd season)
- Captain: John T. Coburn
- Home stadium: Broad Street Park

1915 Eastern Virginia Intercollegiate Athletic Association football standings
	Conf.					Overall
Team	W		L		T	W		L		T
Hampden–Sydney $	5	–	1	–	0	6	–	3	–	0
Richmond	3	–	2	–	1	4	–	4	–	1
Randolph–Macon	3	–	2	–	1	4	–	5	–	1
William & Mary	0	–	6	–	0	0	–	9	–	1
$ – Conference champion

1915 South Atlantic Intercollegiate Athletic Association football standings
	Conf.					Overall
Team	W		L		T	W		L		T
Virginia +	2	–	0	–	0	8	–	1	–	0
Washington and Lee +	2	–	0	–	0	6	–	1	–	1
Georgetown +	2	–	0	–	0	7	–	2	–	0
Catholic University	1	–	0	–	0	5	–	2	–	0
Johns Hopkins	1	–	0	–	0	1	–	0	–	0
Richmond	0	–	1	–	0	4	–	4	–	1
VPI	0	–	1	–	0	4	–	4	–	0
North Carolina A&M	0	–	2	–	0	3	–	3	–	1
North Carolina	0	–	2	–	0	4	–	3	–	1
+ – Conference co-champions

The 1915 Richmond Spiders football team was an American football team that represented Richmond College—now known as the University of Richmond—as a member of the Eastern Virginia Intercollegiate Athletic Association (EVIAA) and the South Atlantic Intercollegiate Athletic Association (SAIAA) during the 1915 college football season. Led by third-year head coach Frank Dobson, Richmond finished the season 4–4–1 overall, 3–2–1 in EVIAA play, and 0–1 against SAIAA opponents.

== Schedule ==
Date	Opponent	Site	Result	Source
October 2	Richmond Blues*	Broad Street Park; Richmond, VA	W 14–7	
October 9	at Virginia	Lambeth Field; Charlottesville, VA	L 0–74	
October 16	at VMI*	Lexington, VA (rivalry)	L 6–13	
October 23	at William & Mary	Williamsburg, VA (rivalry)	W 28–0	
October 30	Hampden–Sydney	Richmond, VA	L 6–7	
November 6	Randolph–Macon	Richmond, VA	W 7–6	
November 13	at Hampden–Sydney	Venable Athletic Field; Hampden Sydney, VA	L 8–15	
November 20	William & Mary	Richmond, VA	W 40–0	
November 27	Randolph–Macon	Richmond, VA	T 0–0	
*Non-conference game
