= 1921 Johns Hopkins Blue Jays football team =

American college football season

1921 Johns Hopkins Blue Jays football
- Conference: South Atlantic Intercollegiate Athletic Association
- Record: 6–3 (0–2 SAIAA)
- Head coach: Ray Van Orman (2nd season)
- Home stadium: Homewood Field

1921 South Atlantic Intercollegiate Athletic Association football standings
	Conf.					Overall
Team	W		L		T	W		L		T
Washington and Lee $	2	–	0	–	0	6	–	3	–	0
Georgetown	1	–	0	–	0	8	–	1	–	0
Virginia	5	–	1	–	0	5	–	4	–	0
North Carolina	3	–	1	–	1	5	–	2	–	2
VPI	4	–	2	–	0	7	–	3	–	0
Maryland	2	–	1	–	1	3	–	5	–	1
Richmond	2	–	2	–	1	4	–	3	–	1
Catholic University	2	–	2	–	0	3	–	5	–	0
NC State	1	–	1	–	3	3	–	3	–	3
William & Mary	1	–	3	–	1	4	–	3	–	1
Trinity (NC)	0	–	1	–	0	6	–	1	–	2
Davidson	0	–	1	–	3	3	–	4	–	3
Johns Hopkins	0	–	2	–	0	6	–	3	–	0
VMI	0	–	3	–	1	3	–	5	–	1
George Washington	0	–	3	–	1	3	–	3	–	2
$ – Conference champion

The 1921 Johns Hopkins Blue Jays football team was an American football team that represented Johns Hopkins University during the 1921 college football season as a member of the South Atlantic Intercollegiate Athletic Association. In their second year under head coach Ray Van Orman, the team compiled an overall record of 6–3.

== Schedule ==
Date	Opponent	Site	Result	Attendance	Source
October 1	Mount St. Mary's*	Homewood Field; Baltimore, MD	W 3–2	2,000	
October 8	Delaware*	Homewood Field; Baltimore, MD	W 27–0		
October 15	Dickinson*	Homewood Field; Baltimore, MD	W 6–0		
October 22	at Virginia	Lambeth Field; Charlottesville, VA	L 7–14		
October 29	Western Maryland*	Homewood Field; Baltimore, MD	W 44–0		
November 5	Haverford*	Homewood Field; Baltimore, MD	W 28–3		
November 12	at Swarthmore*	Clothier Field Stadium; Swarthmore, PA	L 0–7		
November 19	St. John's (MD)*	Homewood Field; Baltimore, MD	W 17–3	10,000	
November 24	Washington and Lee	Homewood Field; Baltimore, MD	L 7–0	2,000	
*Non-conference game
