= 1921 Maryland Aggies football team =

American college football season

1921 Maryland Aggies football
- Conference: South Atlantic Intercollegiate Athletic Association
- Record: 3–5–1 (2–1–1 SAIAA)
- Head coach: Curley Byrd (11th season)

1921 South Atlantic Intercollegiate Athletic Association football standings
	Conf.					Overall
Team	W		L		T	W		L		T
Washington and Lee $	2	–	0	–	0	6	–	3	–	0
Georgetown	1	–	0	–	0	8	–	1	–	0
Virginia	5	–	1	–	0	5	–	4	–	0
North Carolina	3	–	1	–	1	5	–	2	–	2
VPI	4	–	2	–	0	7	–	3	–	0
Maryland	2	–	1	–	1	3	–	5	–	1
Richmond	2	–	2	–	1	4	–	3	–	1
Catholic University	2	–	2	–	0	3	–	5	–	0
NC State	1	–	1	–	3	3	–	3	–	3
William & Mary	1	–	3	–	1	4	–	3	–	1
Trinity (NC)	0	–	1	–	0	6	–	1	–	2
Davidson	0	–	1	–	3	3	–	4	–	3
Johns Hopkins	0	–	2	–	0	6	–	3	–	0
VMI	0	–	3	–	1	3	–	5	–	1
George Washington	0	–	3	–	1	3	–	3	–	2
$ – Conference champion

The 1921 Maryland Aggies football team was an American football team that represented the University of Maryland in the South Atlantic Intercollegiate Athletic Association (SAIAA) during the 1921 college football season. In their 11th season under head coach Curley Byrd, the Aggies compiled a 3–5–1 record (2–1–1 against SAIAA opponents), finished eighth place in the conference, and were outscored by a total of 127 to 45.

== Schedule ==
Date	Opponent	Site	Result	Attendance	Source
October 1	at Rutgers*	Neilson Field; New Brunswick, NJ	W 3–0		
October 8	at Syracuse*	Archbold Stadium; Syracuse, NY	L 0–42	9,000	
October 15	at St. John's (MD)*	Annapolis, MD	L 3–7		
October 22	vs. VPI	Washington, DC	W 10–7		
October 29	vs. North Carolina	Oriole Park; Baltimore, MD	L 7–16		
November 5	at Yale*	Yale Bowl; New Haven, CT	L 0–28		
November 12	at Catholic University	American League Park; Washington, DC	W 16–0	3,500	
November 19	at Carnegie Tech*	Tech Field; Pittsburgh, PA	L 0–21		
November 24	at NC State	Riddick Stadium; Raleigh, NC	T 6–6		
*Non-conference game
