= 1913 Virginia Orange and Blue football team =

American college football season

1913 Virginia Orange and Blue football
- Conference: South Atlantic Intercollegiate Athletic Association
- Record: 7–1 (1–1 SAIAA)
- Head coach: W. Rice Warren (1st season)
- Home stadium: Lambeth Field

1913 South Atlantic Intercollegiate Athletic Association football standings
	Conf.					Overall
Team	W		L		T	W		L		T
North Carolina A&M $	2	–	0	–	0	6	–	1	–	0
Washington and Lee	3	–	1	–	0	8	–	1	–	0
Virginia	1	–	1	–	0	7	–	1	–	0
VPI	1	–	1	–	0	7	–	1	–	1
Georgetown	1	–	1	–	0	4	–	4	–	0
Johns Hopkins	0	–	1	–	0	3	–	4	–	0
North Carolina	0	–	3	–	0	5	–	4	–	0
$ – Conference champion

The 1913 Virginia Orange and Blue football team represented the University of Virginia as a member of the South Atlantic Intercollegiate Athletic Association (SAIAA) during the 1913 college football season. Led by first-year head coach W. Rice Warren, the team compiled an overall record of 7–1 with a mark of 1–1 in conference play, tying for third place in the SAIAA.

== Schedule ==
Date	Opponent	Site	Result	Attendance	Source
September 27	Randolph–Macon	Lambeth Field; Charlottesville, VA	W 40–0		
October 4	South Carolina	Lambeth Field; Charlottesville, VA	W 54–0		
October 11	Hampden–Sydney	Lambeth Field; Charlottesville, VA	W 53–0		
October 18	VMI	Lambeth Field; Charlottesville, VA	W 38–7		
October 25	vs. Georgia	Ponce de Leon Park; Atlanta, GA	W 13–6		
November 1	Vanderbilt	Lambeth Field; Charlottesville, VA	W 34–0		
November 15	at Georgetown	Georgetown Field; Washington, DC	L 7–8		
November 27	vs. North Carolina	Broad Street Park; Richmond, VA (rivalry)	W 26–7	10,000–12,000	
