= 1921 Davidson Wildcats football team =

American college football season

1921 Davidson Wildcats football
- Conference: South Atlantic Intercollegiate Athletic Association
- Record: 3–4–3 (0–1–3 SAIAA)
- Head coach: H. M. Grey (2nd season)
- Home stadium: Sprunt Field

1921 South Atlantic Intercollegiate Athletic Association football standings
	Conf.					Overall
Team	W		L		T	W		L		T
Washington and Lee $	2	–	0	–	0	6	–	3	–	0
Georgetown	1	–	0	–	0	8	–	1	–	0
Virginia	5	–	1	–	0	5	–	4	–	0
North Carolina	3	–	1	–	1	5	–	2	–	2
VPI	4	–	2	–	0	7	–	3	–	0
Maryland	2	–	1	–	1	3	–	5	–	1
Richmond	2	–	2	–	1	4	–	3	–	1
Catholic University	2	–	2	–	0	3	–	5	–	0
NC State	1	–	1	–	3	3	–	3	–	3
William & Mary	1	–	3	–	1	4	–	3	–	1
Trinity (NC)	0	–	1	–	0	6	–	1	–	2
Davidson	0	–	1	–	3	3	–	4	–	3
Johns Hopkins	0	–	2	–	0	6	–	3	–	0
VMI	0	–	3	–	1	3	–	5	–	1
George Washington	0	–	3	–	1	3	–	3	–	2
$ – Conference champion

The 1921 Davidson Wildcats football team was an American football team that represented the Davidson College as a member of the South Atlantic Intercollegiate Athletic Association (SAIAA) during the 1921 college football season. In their second year under head coach H. M. Grey, the team compiled a 3–4–3 record.

== Schedule ==
Date	Opponent	Site	Result	Attendance	Source
September 24	at Virginia	Lambeth Field; Charlottesville, VA	L 0–28		
September 30	Presbyterian*	Sprunt Field; Davidson, NC	W 7–0		
October 8	at Georgia Tech*	Grant Field; Atlanta, GA	L 0–70		
October 15	vs. Wake Forest*	Wearn Field; Charlotte, NC	L 7–10		
October 22	Wofford*	Sprunt Field; Davidson, NC	W 87–0		
October 29	at Richmond	Stadium Field; Richmond, VA	T 14–14		
November 5	vs. NC State	Wearn Field; Charlotte, NC	T 3–3		
November 12	vs. North Carolina	South Side Park; Winston-Salem, NC	T 0–0	3,000	
November 18	Elon*	Sprunt Field; Davidson, NC	W 47–0		
November 24	at Furman*	Manly Field; Greenville, SC	L 0–28	4,000	
*Non-conference game
