= 1913 Washington and Lee Generals football team =

American college football season

1913 Washington and Lee Generals football
- Conference: South Atlantic Intercollegiate Athletic Association
- Record: 8–1 (3–1 SAIAA)
- Head coach: Heman L. Dowd (1st season)
- Home stadium: Wilson Field

1913 South Atlantic Intercollegiate Athletic Association football standings
	Conf.					Overall
Team	W		L		T	W		L		T
North Carolina A&M $	2	–	0	–	0	6	–	1	–	0
Washington and Lee	3	–	1	–	0	8	–	1	–	0
Virginia	1	–	1	–	0	7	–	1	–	0
VPI	1	–	1	–	0	7	–	1	–	1
Georgetown	1	–	1	–	0	4	–	4	–	0
Johns Hopkins	0	–	1	–	0	3	–	4	–	0
North Carolina	0	–	3	–	0	5	–	4	–	0
$ – Conference champion

The 1913 Washington and Lee Generals football team represented Washington and Lee University as a member of the South Atlantic Intercollegiate Athletic Association (SAIAA) during the 1913 college football season. Led by Heman L. Dowd in his first and only year as head coach, the Generals compiled an overall record of 8–1 with a mark of 3–1 in SAIAA play.

== Schedule ==
Date	Time	Opponent	Site	Result	Source
September 27		Medical College of Virginia*	Wilson Field; Lexington, VA	W 27–0	
October 4		Gallaudet*	Wilson Field; Lexington, VA	W 24–0	
October 11		St. John's (MD)*	Wilson Field; Lexington, VA	W 19–0	
October 18		at Johns Hopkins	Homewood Field; Baltimore, MD	W 34–3	
October 25		Wake Forest*	Wilson Field; Lexington, VA	W 33–0	
November 1	3:00 p.m.	vs. VPI	Fair Grounds; Roanoke, VA	W 21–0	
November 8		vs. North Carolina	Fair Grounds; Lynchburg, VA	W 14–0	
November 15		vs. West Virginia*	Charleston, WV	W 28–0	
November 27		vs. North Carolina A&M	League Park; Norfolk, VA	L 0–6	
*Non-conference game; All times are in Eastern time
