= 1915 William & Mary Orange and Black football team =

American college football season

1915 William & Mary Orange and Black football
- Conference: Eastern Virginia Intercollegiate Athletic Association
- Record: 0–9–1 (0–6 EVIAA)
- Head coach: Dexter W. Draper (3rd season)
- Captain: C. R. Heflin

1915 Eastern Virginia Intercollegiate Athletic Association football standings
| | Conf. | | | | | Overall |
| Team | W | | L | | T | W | | L | | T |
|---|---|---|---|---|---|---|---|---|---|---|
| Hampden–Sydney $ | 5 | – | 1 | – | 0 | 6 | – | 3 | – | 0 |
| Richmond | 3 | – | 2 | – | 1 | 4 | – | 4 | – | 1 |
| Randolph–Macon | 3 | – | 2 | – | 1 | 4 | – | 5 | – | 1 |
| William & Mary | 0 | – | 6 | – | 0 | 0 | – | 9 | – | 1 |
$ – Conference champion

The 1915 William & Mary Orange and Black football team represented the College of William & Mary as a member of the Eastern Virginia Intercollegiate Athletic Association (EVIAA) during the 1915 college football season. Led by third-year head coach Dexter W. Draper, William & Mary finished the season with an overall record of 0–9–1 and a mark of 0–6 in conference play, placing last out of four teams in the EVIAA.

== Schedule ==
| Date | Opponent | Site | Result |
|---|---|---|---|
| September 29 | Union Theological Seminary* | Williamsburg, VA | L 0–7 |
| October 2 | at VMI* | VMI Parade Ground; Lexington, VA (rivalry) | L 6–19 |
| October 9 | Richmond Blues* | Williamsburg, VA | T 0–0 |
| October 16 | at Hampden–Sydney | Hampden Sydney, VA | L 0–28 |
| October 23 | Richmond | Williamsburg, VA (rivalry) | L 0–28 |
| October 30 | at Randolph–Macon | Ashland, VA | L 7–34 |
| November 6 | vs. Hampden–Sydney | Newport News, VA | L 0–38 |
| November 13 | Randolph–Macon | Williamsburg, VA | L 7–15 |
| November 20 | at Richmond | Richmond, VA | L 0–45 |
| November 25 | at Delaware* | Frazer Field; Newark, DE (rivalry) | L 0–93 |
*Non-conference game
