= 1915 Washington and Lee Generals football team =

American college football season

1915 Washington and Lee Generals football

SAIAA co-champion
- Conference: South Atlantic Intercollegiate Athletic Association
- Record: 6–1–1 (2–0 SAIAA)
- Head coach: Jogger Elcock (2nd season)
- Captain: Ted Shultz
- Home stadium: Wilson Field

1915 South Atlantic Intercollegiate Athletic Association football standings
	Conf.					Overall
Team	W		L		T	W		L		T
Virginia +	2	–	0	–	0	8	–	1	–	0
Washington and Lee +	2	–	0	–	0	6	–	1	–	1
Georgetown +	2	–	0	–	0	7	–	2	–	0
Catholic University	1	–	0	–	0	5	–	2	–	0
Johns Hopkins	1	–	0	–	0	1	–	0	–	0
Richmond	0	–	1	–	0	4	–	4	–	1
VPI	0	–	1	–	0	4	–	4	–	0
North Carolina A&M	0	–	2	–	0	3	–	3	–	1
North Carolina	0	–	2	–	0	4	–	3	–	1
+ – Conference co-champions

The 1915 Washington and Lee Generals football team represented Washington and Lee University during the 1915 college football season. Ted Shultz was captain. The team also included Cy Young and Johnny Barrett. Barrett ran 90 yards on Cornell.

== Schedule ==
Date	Opponent	Site	Result	Attendance	Source
September 25	Davidson*	Wilson Field; Lexington, VA	W 14–0		
October 2	vs. West Virginia Wesleyan*	Lynchburg, VA	W 20–0		
October 9	Marshall*	Wilson Field; Lexington, VA	W 27–0		
October 16	vs. VPI	Fair Grounds; Roanoke, VA	W 13–0	4,000	
October 30	vs. Indiana*	Washington Park; Indianapolis, IN	T 7–7	8,500	
November 6	Roanoke*	Wilson Field; Lexington, VA	W 21–0		
November 13	at Cornell*	Schoellkopf Field; Ithaca, NY	L 21–40		
November 25	vs. North Carolina A&M	League Park; Norfolk, VA	W 48–13		
*Non-conference game
