= 1921 Richmond Spiders football team =

American college football season

1921 Richmond Spiders football
- Conference: South Atlantic Intercollegiate Athletic Association
- Record: 4–3–1 (2–2–1 SAIAA)
- Head coach: Frank Dobson (8th season)
- Captain: R. Tyler Price
- Home stadium: Stadium Field

1921 South Atlantic Intercollegiate Athletic Association football standings
	Conf.					Overall
Team	W		L		T	W		L		T
Washington and Lee $	2	–	0	–	0	6	–	3	–	0
Georgetown	1	–	0	–	0	8	–	1	–	0
Virginia	5	–	1	–	0	5	–	4	–	0
North Carolina	3	–	1	–	1	5	–	2	–	2
VPI	4	–	2	–	0	7	–	3	–	0
Maryland	2	–	1	–	1	3	–	5	–	1
Richmond	2	–	2	–	1	4	–	3	–	1
Catholic University	2	–	2	–	0	3	–	5	–	0
NC State	1	–	1	–	3	3	–	3	–	3
William & Mary	1	–	3	–	1	4	–	3	–	1
Trinity (NC)	0	–	1	–	0	6	–	1	–	2
Davidson	0	–	1	–	3	3	–	4	–	3
Johns Hopkins	0	–	2	–	0	6	–	3	–	0
VMI	0	–	3	–	1	3	–	5	–	1
George Washington	0	–	3	–	1	3	–	3	–	2
$ – Conference champion

The 1921 Richmond Spiders football team was an American football team that represented the University of Richmond as a member of the South Atlantic Intercollegiate Athletic Association (SAIAA) during the 1921 college football season. Led by eighth-year head coach, Frank Dobson, Richmond compiled an overall record of 4–3–1 with a mark of 2–2–1 in conference play. 1921 was the team's final season in the SAIAA.

== Schedule ==
Date	Time	Opponent	Site	Result	Source
October 1	4:00 p.m.	Catholic University	Stadium Field; Richmond, VA	W 14–0	
October 8		at Virginia	Lambeth Field; Charlottesville, VA	L 0–14	
October 15		VPI	Stadium Field; Richmond, VA	L 0–34	
October 22		Hampden–Sydney*	Stadium Field; Richmond, VA	L 5–7	
October 29		Davidson	Stadium Field; Richmond, VA	T 14–14	
November 5	3:00 p.m.	Wake Forest*	Stadium Field; Richmond, VA	W 41–0	
November 12		Randolph–Macon*	Stadium Field; Richmond, VA	W 49–0	
November 24		William & Mary	Boulevard Field; Richmond, VA (rivalry)	W 17–7	
*Non-conference game; All times are in Eastern time
