= 1921 George Washington Hatchetites football team =

American college football season

1921 George Washington Hatchetites football
- Conference: South Atlantic Intercollegiate Athletic Association
- Record: 3–3–2 (0–3–1 SAIAA)
- Head coach: William Quigley (1st season)
- Home stadium: Union League Park

1921 South Atlantic Intercollegiate Athletic Association football standings
	Conf.					Overall
Team	W		L		T	W		L		T
Washington and Lee $	2	–	0	–	0	6	–	3	–	0
Georgetown	1	–	0	–	0	8	–	1	–	0
Virginia	5	–	1	–	0	5	–	4	–	0
North Carolina	3	–	1	–	1	5	–	2	–	2
VPI	4	–	2	–	0	7	–	3	–	0
Maryland	2	–	1	–	1	3	–	5	–	1
Richmond	2	–	2	–	1	4	–	3	–	1
Catholic University	2	–	2	–	0	3	–	5	–	0
NC State	1	–	1	–	3	3	–	3	–	3
William & Mary	1	–	3	–	1	4	–	3	–	1
Trinity (NC)	0	–	1	–	0	6	–	1	–	2
Davidson	0	–	1	–	3	3	–	4	–	3
Johns Hopkins	0	–	2	–	0	6	–	3	–	0
VMI	0	–	3	–	1	3	–	5	–	1
George Washington	0	–	3	–	1	3	–	3	–	2
$ – Conference champion

The 1921 George Washington Hatchetites Colonials football team was an American football team that represented George Washington University as a member of the South Atlantic Intercollegiate Athletic Association during the 1921 college football season. In their first season under head coach William Quigley, the team compiled a 3–3–2 record.

== Schedule ==
Date	Opponent	Site	Result	Source
October 1	at Virginia	Lambeth Field; Charlottesville, VA	L 0–28	
October 8	Western Maryland*	Union League Park; Washington, DC	W 20–0	
October 15	at William & Mary	League Park; Norfolk, VA	T 7–7	
October 22	at Drexel*	Strawbridge and Clothier Field; Philadelphia, PA	W 40–0	
October 29	vs. Georgetown	American League Park; Washington, DC	L 0–28	
November 5	at Washington College*	Washington Field; Chestertown, MD	W 56–0	
November 11	vs. Gallaudet*	American League Park; Washington, DC	T 7–7	
November 26	vs. Catholic University	American League Park; Washington, DC	L 19–7	
*Non-conference game
