= 1921 Virginia Orange and Blue football team =

American college football season

1921 Virginia Orange and Blue football
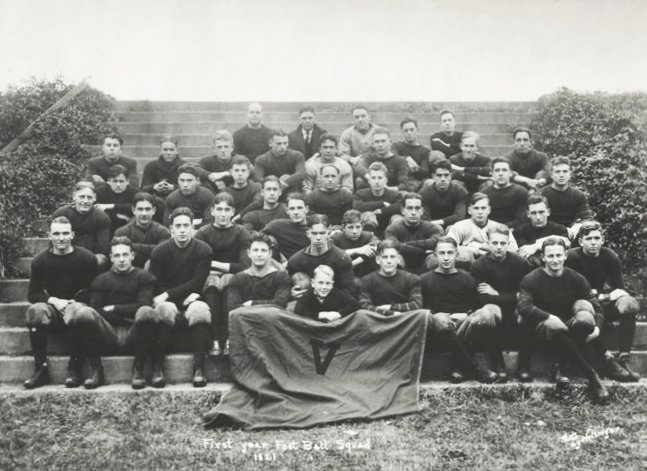
- Conference: South Atlantic Intercollegiate Athletic Association
- Record: 5–4 (5–1 SAIAA)
- Head coach: W. Rice Warren (3rd season)
- Home stadium: Lambeth Field

1921 South Atlantic Intercollegiate Athletic Association football standings
	Conf.					Overall
Team	W		L		T	W		L		T
Washington and Lee $	2	–	0	–	0	6	–	3	–	0
Georgetown	1	–	0	–	0	8	–	1	–	0
Virginia	5	–	1	–	0	5	–	4	–	0
North Carolina	3	–	1	–	1	5	–	2	–	2
VPI	4	–	2	–	0	7	–	3	–	0
Maryland	2	–	1	–	1	3	–	5	–	1
Richmond	2	–	2	–	1	4	–	3	–	1
Catholic University	2	–	2	–	0	3	–	5	–	0
NC State	1	–	1	–	3	3	–	3	–	3
William & Mary	1	–	3	–	1	4	–	3	–	1
Trinity (NC)	0	–	1	–	0	6	–	1	–	2
Davidson	0	–	1	–	3	3	–	4	–	3
Johns Hopkins	0	–	2	–	0	6	–	3	–	0
VMI	0	–	3	–	1	3	–	5	–	1
George Washington	0	–	3	–	1	3	–	3	–	2
$ – Conference champion

The 1921 Virginia Orange and Blue football team was an American football team that represented the University of Virginia as a member of the South Atlantic Intercollegiate Athletic Association (SAIAA) during the 1921 college football season. Led by W. Rice Warren in his third and final season as head coach, the Orange and Blue compiled an overall record of 5–4 with a mark of 5–1 in conference play, placing third in the SAIAA.

== Schedule ==
Date	Opponent	Site	Result	Source
September 24	Davidson	Lambeth Field; Charlottesville, VA	W 28–0	
October 1	George Washington	Lambeth Field; Charlottesville, VA	W 28–0	
October 8	Richmond	Lambeth Field; Charlottesville, VA	W 14–0	
October 15	at VMI	Alumni Field; Lexington, VA	W 14–7	
October 22	Johns Hopkins	Lambeth Field; Charlottesville, VA	W 14–7	
October 29	at Princeton*	Palmer Stadium; Princeton, NJ	L 0–34	
November 5	at Georgia*	Sanford Field; Athens, GA	L 0–21	
November 12	West Virginia*	Lambeth Field; Charlottesville, VA	L 0–7	
November 24	at North Carolina	Emerson Field; Chapel Hill, NC (rivalry)	L 3–7	
*Non-conference game
