= 1921 Catholic University Red and Black football team =

American college football season

1921 Catholic University Cardinals football
- Conference: South Atlantic Intercollegiate Athletic Association
- Record: 3–5 (2–2 SAIAA)
- Head coach: Harry Robb (2nd season)

1921 South Atlantic Intercollegiate Athletic Association football standings
	Conf.					Overall
Team	W		L		T	W		L		T
Washington and Lee $	2	–	0	–	0	6	–	3	–	0
Georgetown	1	–	0	–	0	8	–	1	–	0
Virginia	5	–	1	–	0	5	–	4	–	0
North Carolina	3	–	1	–	1	5	–	2	–	2
VPI	4	–	2	–	0	7	–	3	–	0
Maryland	2	–	1	–	1	3	–	5	–	1
Richmond	2	–	2	–	1	4	–	3	–	1
Catholic University	2	–	2	–	0	3	–	5	–	0
NC State	1	–	1	–	3	3	–	3	–	3
William & Mary	1	–	3	–	1	4	–	3	–	1
Trinity (NC)	0	–	1	–	0	6	–	1	–	2
Davidson	0	–	1	–	3	3	–	4	–	3
Johns Hopkins	0	–	2	–	0	6	–	3	–	0
VMI	0	–	3	–	1	3	–	5	–	1
George Washington	0	–	3	–	1	3	–	3	–	2
$ – Conference champion

The 1921 Catholic University Cardinals football team was an American football team that represented the Catholic University of America as a member of the South Atlantic Intercollegiate Athletic Association (SAIAA) during the 1921 college football season. In their second season under head coach Harry Robb, the Cardinals compiled a 3–5 record.

== Schedule ==
Date	Time	Opponent	Site	Result	Attendance	Source
October 1	4:00 p.m.	at Richmond	Stadium Field; Richmond, VA	L 0–14		
October 8		at Fordham*	Fordham Field; Bronx, NY	L 0–10		
October 15		Mount St. Mary's*	Brookland Field; Washington, D.C.	W 7–0		
October 22		Villanova*	Brookland Field; Washington, D.C.	L 0–6		
October 29		at Bucknell*	Tustin Field; Lewisburg, PA	L 0–41		
November 5		vs. William & Mary	Newport News, VA	W 27–13		
November 12		Maryland	American League Park; Washington, D.C.	L 0–16	3,500	
November 26		vs. George Washington	American League Park; Washington, D.C.	W 19–7		
*Non-conference game; All times are in Eastern time
