= 1915 North Carolina A&M Aggies football team =

American college football season

1915 North Carolina A&M Aggies football
- Conference: South Atlantic Intercollegiate Athletic Association
- Record: 3–3–1 (0–2 SAIAA)
- Head coach: Jack Hegarty (2nd season)
- Home stadium: Riddick Stadium

1915 South Atlantic Intercollegiate Athletic Association football standings
	Conf.					Overall
Team	W		L		T	W		L		T
Virginia +	2	–	0	–	0	8	–	1	–	0
Washington and Lee +	2	–	0	–	0	6	–	1	–	1
Georgetown +	2	–	0	–	0	7	–	2	–	0
Catholic University	1	–	0	–	0	5	–	2	–	0
Johns Hopkins	1	–	0	–	0	1	–	0	–	0
Richmond	0	–	1	–	0	4	–	4	–	1
VPI	0	–	1	–	0	4	–	4	–	0
North Carolina A&M	0	–	2	–	0	3	–	3	–	1
North Carolina	0	–	2	–	0	4	–	3	–	1
+ – Conference co-champions

The 1915 North Carolina A&M Aggies football team was an American football team that represented North Carolina College of Agriculture and Mechanic Arts (later renamed North Carolina State University) as a member of the South Atlantic Intercollegiate Athletic Association (SAIAA) during the 1915 college football season. In their second year under head coach Jack Hegarty, the team compiled a 3–3–1 record.

== Schedule ==
Date	Opponent	Site	Result	Source
October 9	Roanoke*	Riddick Stadium; Raleigh, NC	T 0–0	
October 16	at Wake Forest*	Wake Forest, NC (rivalry)	W 7–0	
October 21	South Carolina*	Riddick Stadium; Raleigh, NC	L 10–19	
October 30	at Navy*	Worden Field; Annapolis, MD	W 14–12	
November 6	Gallaudet*	Riddick Stadium; Raleigh, NC	W 27–7	
November 13	at Georgetown	Georgetown Field; Washington, DC	L 0–28	
November 25	vs. Washington and Lee	League Park; Norfolk, VA	L 13–48	
*Non-conference game
