= 1921 NC State Aggies football team =

American college football season

1921 NC State Aggies football
- Conference: South Atlantic Intercollegiate Athletic Association
- Record: 3–3–3 (1–1–3 SAIAA)
- Head coach: Harry Hartsell (2nd season)
- Home stadium: Riddick Stadium

1921 South Atlantic Intercollegiate Athletic Association football standings
	Conf.					Overall
Team	W		L		T	W		L		T
Washington and Lee $	2	–	0	–	0	6	–	3	–	0
Georgetown	1	–	0	–	0	8	–	1	–	0
Virginia	5	–	1	–	0	5	–	4	–	0
North Carolina	3	–	1	–	1	5	–	2	–	2
VPI	4	–	2	–	0	7	–	3	–	0
Maryland	2	–	1	–	1	3	–	5	–	1
Richmond	2	–	2	–	1	4	–	3	–	1
Catholic University	2	–	2	–	0	3	–	5	–	0
NC State	1	–	1	–	3	3	–	3	–	3
William & Mary	1	–	3	–	1	4	–	3	–	1
Trinity (NC)	0	–	1	–	0	6	–	1	–	2
Davidson	0	–	1	–	3	3	–	4	–	3
Johns Hopkins	0	–	2	–	0	6	–	3	–	0
VMI	0	–	3	–	1	3	–	5	–	1
George Washington	0	–	3	–	1	3	–	3	–	2
$ – Conference champion

The 1921 NC State Aggies football team was an American football team that represented North Carolina State University during the 1921 college football season. In its second season under head coach Harry Hartsell, the team compiled a 3–3–3 record.

== Schedule ==
Date	Time	Opponent	Site	Result	Attendance	Source
September 24		Randolph–Macon*	Riddick Stadium; Raleigh, NC	W 21–0		
October 1		at Navy*	Worden Field; Annapolis, MD	L 0–40		
October 8		at Penn State*	New Beaver Field; University Park, PA	L 0–35	3,000	
October 20		North Carolina	Riddick Stadium; Raleigh, NC (rivalry)	W 7–0	9,000	
October 29		VMI	Riddick Stadium; Raleigh, NC	T 7–7		
November 5		vs. Davidson	Wearn Field; Charlotte, NC	T 3–3		
November 11	3:00 p.m.	vs. VPI	League Park; Norfolk, VA	L 3–7		
November 19		at Wake Forest*	Wake Forest, NC (rivalry)	W 14–0	8,000	
November 24		Maryland	Riddick Stadium; Raleigh, NC	T 6–6		
*Non-conference game
