= 1921 Trinity Blue and White football team =

American college football season

1921 Trinity Blue and White football
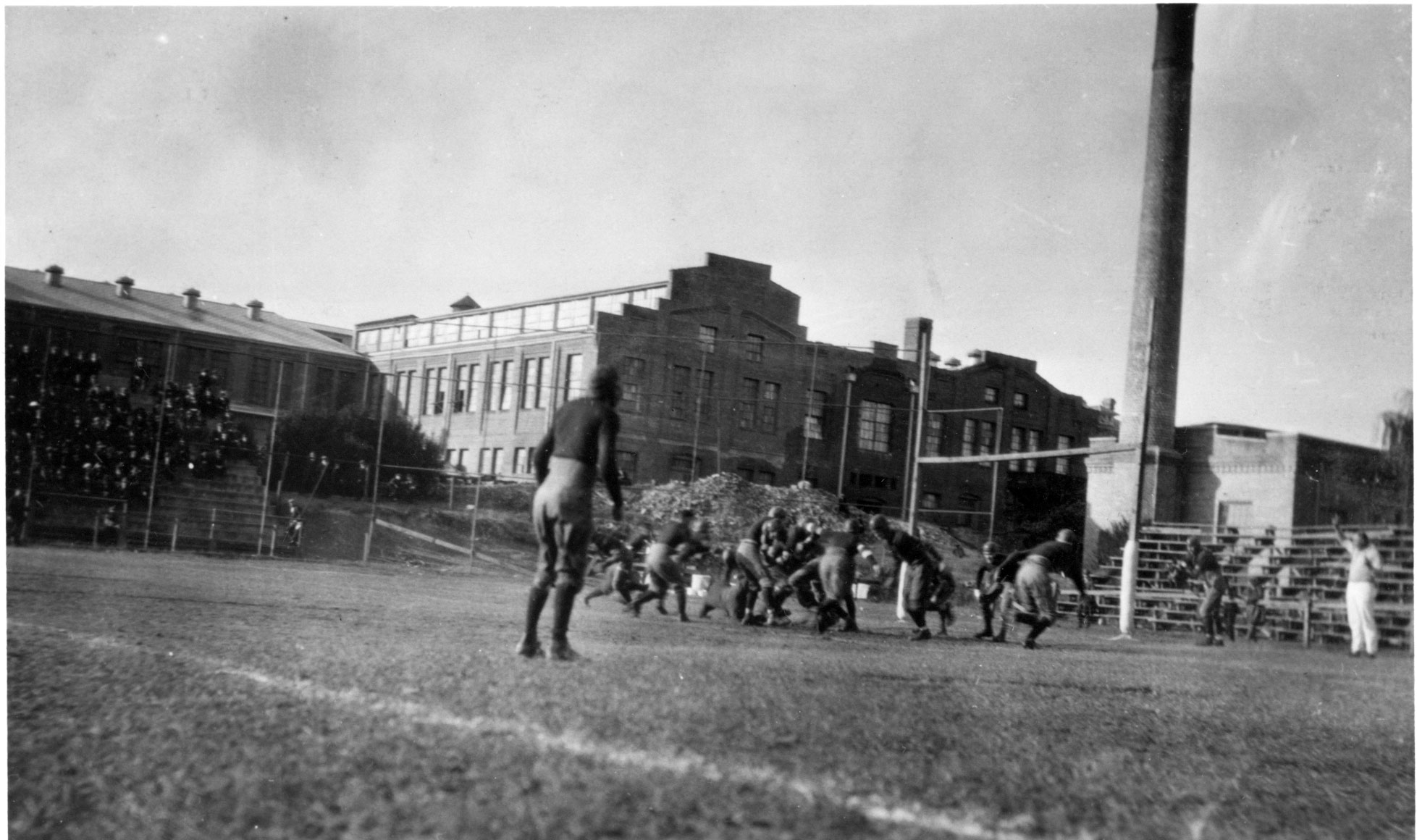
- Conference: South Atlantic Intercollegiate Athletic Association
- Record: 6–1–2 (0–1 SAIAA)
- Head coach: James A. Baldwin (1st season)
- Captain: Richard Leach

1921 South Atlantic Intercollegiate Athletic Association football standings
	Conf.					Overall
Team	W		L		T	W		L		T
Washington and Lee $	2	–	0	–	0	6	–	3	–	0
Georgetown	1	–	0	–	0	8	–	1	–	0
Virginia	5	–	1	–	0	5	–	4	–	0
North Carolina	3	–	1	–	1	5	–	2	–	2
VPI	4	–	2	–	0	7	–	3	–	0
Maryland	2	–	1	–	1	3	–	5	–	1
Richmond	2	–	2	–	1	4	–	3	–	1
Catholic University	2	–	2	–	0	3	–	5	–	0
NC State	1	–	1	–	3	3	–	3	–	3
William & Mary	1	–	3	–	1	4	–	3	–	1
Trinity (NC)	0	–	1	–	0	6	–	1	–	2
Davidson	0	–	1	–	3	3	–	4	–	3
Johns Hopkins	0	–	2	–	0	6	–	3	–	0
VMI	0	–	3	–	1	3	–	5	–	1
George Washington	0	–	3	–	1	3	–	3	–	2
$ – Conference champion

The 1921 Trinity Blue and White football team was an American football team that represented Trinity College (later renamed Duke University) as a member of the South Atlantic Intercollegiate Athletic Association (SAIAA) during the 1921 college football season. In its first and only season under head coach James A. Baldwin, the team compiled a 6–1–2 record (0–1 against SAIAA opponents). Richard Leach was the team captain.

== Schedule ==
Date	Time	Opponent	Site	Result	Attendance	Source
October 1		Lynchburg	Hanes Field; Durham, NC	W 14–13		
October 8		William & Mary	Hanes Field; Durham, NC	L 0–12		
October 15		Randolph–Macon	Hanes Field; Durham, NC	W 6–0		
October 22		at Emory and Henry	Emory, VA	W 7–0		
October 29		Elon	Hanes Field; Durham, NC	T 0–0		
November 5		Guilford	Hanes Field; Durham, NC	W 28–0		
November 11	3:00 p.m.	vs. Wake Forest	Riddick Field; Raleigh, NC	W 17–0		
November 19		at NYU	Ohio Field; Bronx, NY	T 7–7	5,000	
November 24		at Wofford	Spartanburg, SC	W 67–0		
