= 1921 William & Mary Indians football team =

American college football season

1921 William & Mary Indians football
- Conference: South Atlantic Intercollegiate Athletic Association
- Record: 4–3–1 (1–3–1 SAIAA)
- Head coach: Bill Fincher (1st season)
- Captain: J. F. Wilson

1921 South Atlantic Intercollegiate Athletic Association football standings
	Conf.					Overall
Team	W		L		T	W		L		T
Washington and Lee $	2	–	0	–	0	6	–	3	–	0
Georgetown	1	–	0	–	0	8	–	1	–	0
Virginia	5	–	1	–	0	5	–	4	–	0
North Carolina	3	–	1	–	1	5	–	2	–	2
VPI	4	–	2	–	0	7	–	3	–	0
Maryland	2	–	1	–	1	3	–	5	–	1
Richmond	2	–	2	–	1	4	–	3	–	1
Catholic University	2	–	2	–	0	3	–	5	–	0
NC State	1	–	1	–	3	3	–	3	–	3
William & Mary	1	–	3	–	1	4	–	3	–	1
Trinity (NC)	0	–	1	–	0	6	–	1	–	2
Davidson	0	–	1	–	3	3	–	4	–	3
Johns Hopkins	0	–	2	–	0	6	–	3	–	0
VMI	0	–	3	–	1	3	–	5	–	1
George Washington	0	–	3	–	1	3	–	3	–	2
$ – Conference champion

The 1921 William & Mary Indians football team represented the College of William & Mary as a member of the South Atlantic Intercollegiate Athletic Association (SAIAA) during the 1921 college football season. Led by Bill Fincher in his first and only season as head coach, the Indians compiled an overall record of 4–3–1 with a mark of 1–3–1 in conference play.

== Schedule ==
Date	Opponent	Site	Result	Source
October 1	at VPI	Miles Field; Blacksburg, VA	L 0–14	
October 8	at Trinity (NC)	Hanes Field; Durham, NC	W 12–0	
October 15	vs. George Washington	League Park; Norfolk, VA	T 7–7	
October 22	vs. Wake Forest*	League Park; Norfolk, VA	W 21–14	
October 29	Randolph–Macon*	Cary Field; Williamsburg, VA	W 35–0	
November 5	vs. Catholic University	Newport News, VA	L 13–27	
November 12	Union Theological Seminary*	Cary Field; Williamsburg, VA	W 76–0	
November 24	at Richmond	Boulevard Field; Richmond, VA (rivalry)	L 7–17	
*Non-conference game
