= 1922 George Washington Hatchetites football team =

American college football season

1922 George Washington Hatchetites football
- Conference: Independent
- Record: 2–6
- Head coach: William Quigley (2nd season)
- Home stadium: American League Park

1922 Southern college football independents records
	Conf.			Overall
Team	W	L	T	W		L		T
West Virginia		–		10	–	0	–	1
Tennessee Docs		–		7	–	0	–	1
Western Kentucky State Normal		–		9	–	1	–	0
Trinity (NC)		–		7	–	2	–	1
VMI		–		7	–	2	–	0
Abilene Christian		–		6	–	2	–	0
Richmond		–		6	–	2	–	1
West Tennessee State Normal		–		5	–	2	–	3
Navy		–		5	–	2	–	0
Delaware		–		6	–	3	–	0
Stetson		–		4	–	2	–	0
William & Mary		–		6	–	3	–	0
Georgetown		–		6	–	3	–	1
Marion		–		5	–	4	–	1
East Tennessee		–		5	–	4	–	0
Marshall		–		5	–	4	–	0
Roanoke		–		5	–	4	–	0
Texas Mines		–		5	–	4	–	0
Loyola (LA)		–		4	–	3	–	1
Spring Hill		–		4	–	4	–	0
Sam Houston Normal		–		3	–	4	–	0
Wake Forest		–		3	–	5	–	2
Davidson		–		2	–	6	–	2
Catholic University		–		2	–	6	–	0
George Washington		–		2	–	6	–	0
Middle Tennessee State Normal		–		2	–	6	–	0
Mississippi Normal		–		2	–	6	–	0
Louisville		–		2	–	7	–	0
Birmingham–Southern		–		1	–	6	–	1
Erskine		–		0	–	8	–	0

The 1922 George Washington Hatchetites Colonials football team was an American football team that represented George Washington University as an independent during the 1922 college football season. In their second season under head coach William Quigley, the team compiled a 2–6 record.

== Schedule ==
Date	Opponent	Site	Result	Source
September 30	at Virginia	Lambeth Field; Charlottesville, VA	L 0–34	
October 14	at Johns Hopkins	Homewood Field; Baltimore, MD	L 6–40	
October 21	at St. John's (MD)	Annapolis, MD	L 14–27	
October 28	at Bethany (WV)	Kiwanis Park; Wellsburg, WV	L 0–52	
November 4	vs. Gallaudet	Kendall Green; Washington, DC	W 9–6	
November 11	vs. Catholic University	National Park; Washington, DC	W 14–7	
November 18	VMI	Wilson Memorial Stadium; Washington, DC	L 0–45	
November 30	vs. Georgetown	National Park; Washington, DC	L 6–46	
