= 1921 North Carolina Tar Heels football team =

American college football season

1921 North Carolina Tar Heels football
- Conference: South Atlantic Intercollegiate Athletic Association
- Record: 5–2–2 (3–1–1 SAIAA)
- Head coach: Bob Fetzer & Bill Fetzer (1st season)
- Captain: Robbins Lowe
- Home stadium: Emerson Field

1921 South Atlantic Intercollegiate Athletic Association football standings
	Conf.					Overall
Team	W		L		T	W		L		T
Washington and Lee $	2	–	0	–	0	6	–	3	–	0
Georgetown	1	–	0	–	0	8	–	1	–	0
Virginia	5	–	1	–	0	5	–	4	–	0
North Carolina	3	–	1	–	1	5	–	2	–	2
VPI	4	–	2	–	0	7	–	3	–	0
Maryland	2	–	1	–	1	3	–	5	–	1
Richmond	2	–	2	–	1	4	–	3	–	1
Catholic University	2	–	2	–	0	3	–	5	–	0
NC State	1	–	1	–	3	3	–	3	–	3
William & Mary	1	–	3	–	1	4	–	3	–	1
Trinity (NC)	0	–	1	–	0	6	–	1	–	2
Davidson	0	–	1	–	3	3	–	4	–	3
Johns Hopkins	0	–	2	–	0	6	–	3	–	0
VMI	0	–	3	–	1	3	–	5	–	1
George Washington	0	–	3	–	1	3	–	3	–	2
$ – Conference champion

The 1921 North Carolina Tar Heels football team was an American football team that represented the University of North Carolina (now known as the University of North Carolina at Chapel Hill) as a member of the South Atlantic Intercollegiate Athletic Association (SAIAA) during the 1921 college football season. In their first season under head coaches Bob Fetzer and Bill Fetzer, the Tar Heels compiled a 5–2–2 record.

== Schedule ==
Date	Time	Opponent	Site	Result	Attendance	Source
October 1		Wake Forest*	Emerson Field; Chapel Hill, NC (rivalry)	W 21–0		
October 8	3:00 p.m.	at Yale*	Yale Bowl; New Haven, CT	L 0–34	7,000	
October 15		at South Carolina*	University Field; Columbia, SC (rivalry)	T 7–7		
October 20	3:00 p.m.	at NC State	Riddick Field; Raleigh, NC (rivalry)	L 0–7	9,000	
October 29	2:30 p.m.	vs. Maryland	Oriole Park (V); Baltimore, MD	W 16–7	5,000	
November 5	3:00 p.m.	vs. VMI	Mayo Island Park; Richmond, VA	W 20–7		
November 12	2:30 p.m.	vs. Davidson	South Side Park; Winston-Salem, NC	T 0–0	3,000	
November 24	2:00 p.m.	Virginia	Emerson Field; Chapel Hill, NC (rivalry)	W 7–3	10,132	
December 3	3:00 p.m.	vs. Florida*	Barr's Field; Jacksonville, FL	W 14–10	7,500	
*Non-conference game; All times are in Eastern time
