= 1921 VPI Gobblers football team =

American college football season

1921 VPI Gobblers football
- Conference: South Atlantic Intercollegiate Athletic Association
- Record: 7–3 (4–2 SAIAA)
- Head coach: B. C. Cubbage (1st season)
- Captain: Sumner D. Tilson
- Home stadium: Miles Field

1921 South Atlantic Intercollegiate Athletic Association football standings
	Conf.					Overall
Team	W		L		T	W		L		T
Washington and Lee $	2	–	0	–	0	6	–	3	–	0
Georgetown	1	–	0	–	0	8	–	1	–	0
Virginia	5	–	1	–	0	5	–	4	–	0
North Carolina	3	–	1	–	1	5	–	2	–	2
VPI	4	–	2	–	0	7	–	3	–	0
Maryland	2	–	1	–	1	3	–	5	–	1
Richmond	2	–	2	–	1	4	–	3	–	1
Catholic University	2	–	2	–	0	3	–	5	–	0
NC State	1	–	1	–	3	3	–	3	–	3
William & Mary	1	–	3	–	1	4	–	3	–	1
Trinity (NC)	0	–	1	–	0	6	–	1	–	2
Davidson	0	–	1	–	3	3	–	4	–	3
Johns Hopkins	0	–	2	–	0	6	–	3	–	0
VMI	0	–	3	–	1	3	–	5	–	1
George Washington	0	–	3	–	1	3	–	3	–	2
$ – Conference champion

The 1921 VPI Gobblers football team represented Virginia Polytechnic Institute in the 1921 college football season. The team was led by their head coach B. C. Cubbage and finished with a record of seven wins and three losses (7–3).

== Schedule ==
Date	Time	Opponent	Site	Result	Attendance	Source
September 24		Hampden–Sydney*	Miles Field; Blacksburg, VA	W 14–6		
October 1		William & Mary	Miles Field; Blacksburg, VA	W 14–0		
October 8		at Centre*	Cheek Field; Danville, KY	L 0–14		
October 15	3:00 p.m.	at Richmond	Stadium Field; Richmond, VA	W 34–0	4,000	
October 22		vs. Maryland	American League Park; Washington, DC	L 7–10		
October 29		vs. Washington and Lee	Fair Grounds; Lynchburg, VA	L 0–3	6,000–6,750	
November 5		Morris Harvey*	Miles Field; Blacksburg, VA	W 54–7		
November 11	3:00 p.m.	vs. NC State	League Park; Norfolk, VA	W 7–3	8,000	
November 19		Roanoke*	Miles Field; Blacksburg, VA	W 35–0		
November 24	2:30 p.m.	vs. VMI	Fair Grounds; Roanoke, VA (rivalry)	W 26–7	10,000–15,000	
*Non-conference game; All times are in Eastern time

== Before the season ==
The 1920 VPI Gobblers football team compiled a 4–6 record and were led by Stanley Sutton in his only season as head coach.

== Game summaries ==
=== Hampden–Sydney ===
VPI's first game of the season was a victory over Hampden–Sydney at Miles Field.

The starting lineup for VPI was: Hardwick (left end), Tilson (left tackle), Rea (left guard), Resh (center), Moore (right guard), Sherertz (right tackle), Wilson (right end), Wallace (quarterback), Sutton (left halfback), Gettle (right halfback), Hess (fullback). The substitutes were: Baker, Beck, Dean, Hutcheson, Jones, Linkous, Long and Owens.

The starting lineup for Hampden–Sydney was: Watson (left end), William Fuqua (left tackle), William Saunders (left guard), Edwin Sands (center), Ed Sager (right guard), Robert Stoltz (right tackle), Hugh Brenaman (right end), Ben Smith (quarterback), Bailey Tyson (left halfback), Johnson (right halfback), Rex Blankenship (fullback). The substitutes were: Boynton Breitenhirt, H. S. Buchanan, William Day, M. A. Lush, A. J. McKelway and W. H. Simmerman.

=== William & Mary ===
William & Mary vs. VPI

Team	1	2	3	4	Total
W&M	0	0	0	0	0
• VPI	0	7	7	0	14

- Date: October 1, 1921
- Location: Miles Field
  Blacksburg, VA
- Referee: Williams (UVA)

After their victory over Hampden–Sydney, VPI played the College of William & Mary at Miles Field.

The starting lineup for VPI was: Hardwick (left end), Tilson (left tackle), Rea (left guard), Resh (center), Moore (right guard), Hutcheson (right tackle), Wilson (right end), Wallace (quarterback), Sutton (left halfback), Gettle (right halfback), Hess (fullback). The substitutes were: Baker, Beck, Flory, Jones, Rutherford, Sheppard and Sherertz.

The starting lineup for William & Mary was: W. S. Harwood (left end), A. C. Bennett (left tackle), T. J. Young (left guard), John Todd (center), Julius Wilson (right guard), Williams (right tackle), W. S. Sorg (right end), Jack Chalkley (quarterback), Fairmount White (left halfback), Harvey Hastings (right halfback), Thomas Jordan (fullback). The substitutes were: Earnest Dietz, George Flanders, J. C. Fuller, Jones, Paul Keister and Levvy.

=== Centre ===
VPI at Centre

Team	1	2	3	4	Total
VPI	0	0	0	0	0
• Centre	0	0	0	14	14

- Date: October 8, 1921
- Location: Cheek Field
  Danville, KY
- Referee: Frank Marty

The starting lineup for VPI was: Hardwick (left end), Tilson (left tackle), Rea (left guard), Resh (center), Moore (right guard), Sherertz (right tackle), Wilson (right end), Wallace (quarterback), Sutton (left halfback), Gettle (right halfback), Hess (fullback). The substitutes were: Flory.

The starting lineup for Centre was: Bradley (left end), Red Roberts (left tackle), George Jones (left guard), Ed Kubale (center), Ben Cregor (right guard), Bill James (right tackle), Minos Gordy (right end), Bo McMillin (quarterback), Thomas Bartlett (left halfback), Norris Armstrong (right halfback), John Tanner (fullback). The substitutes were: J. Greene.

=== Richmond ===
VPI at Richmond

Team	1	2	3	4	Total
• VPI	7	13	0	14	34
Richmond	0	0	0	0	0

- Date: October 15, 1921
- Location: Stadium Field
  Richmond, VA
- Game start: 3:00 p.m.
- Game attendance: 4,000
- Referee: Robert Kent Gooch

The starting lineup for VPI was: Hardwick (left end), Tilson (left tackle), Rea (left guard), Resh (center), Sheppard (right guard), Sherertz (right tackle), Wilson (right end), Wallace (quarterback), Sutton (left halfback), Gettle (right halfback), Hess (fullback). The substitutes were: Baker, Beck, Dean, Flory, Hutcheson, Jones, Moore and Rhodes.

The starting lineup for Richmond was: William Rucker (left end), Graham Carlton (left tackle), Yewell Hodges (left guard), Ralph Bethel (center), Henry Johnson (right guard), Albert Klevesahl (right tackle), Claude Reams (right end), Thurman Towill (quarterback), Waverly Jones (left halfback), William Ziegler (right halfback), E. Hobson Snead (fullback). The substitutes were: Russell Booker, Crosby, John Fray, McAster, Davis Ratcliffe and Hubel Robins.

=== Maryland ===
Maryland vs. VPI

Team	1	2	3	4	Total
• Maryland	0	0	10	0	10
VPI	0	7	0	0	7

- Date: October 22, 1921
- Location: American League Park
  Washington, DC
- Referee: Jack Gass

The starting lineup for VPI was: Hardwick (left end), Tilson (left tackle), Rea (left guard), Resh (center), Moore (right guard), Sherertz (right tackle), Wilson (right end), Wallace (quarterback), Sutton (left halfback), Gettle (right halfback), Hess (fullback). The substitutes were: Flory, Hutcheson, Jones and Rhodes.

The starting lineup for Maryland was: Walter H. Young (left end), Andy Nesbit (left tackle), Mac Brewer (left guard), George Pollock (center), Jesse Gundry (right guard), Joseph C. Burger (right tackle), Cecil Branner (right end), Eddie Semler (quarterback), Brooke Brewer (left halfback), Romeo Pagnucci (right halfback), Jack McQuade (fullback). The substitutes were: John Groves, Lewis and John Moore.

=== Washington and Lee ===
Washington & Lee vs. VPI

Team	1	2	3	4	Total
• W&L	0	0	0	3	3
VPI	0	0	0	0	0

- Date: October 29, 1921
- Location: Fair Grounds
  Lynchburg, VA
- Game attendance: 6,000–6,750
- Referee: Jack Gass

The starting lineup for VPI was: Hardwick (left end), Tilson (left tackle), Sheppard (left guard), Baker (center), Moore (right guard), Sherertz (right tackle), Wilson (right end), Wallace (quarterback), Sutton (left halfback), Gettle (right halfback), Hess (fullback). The substitutes were: DeLaBarre, Flory, Linkous, Rea, Resh and Rhodes.

The starting lineup for Washington and Lee was: Thomas Bemis (left end), Lindsay Moore (left tackle), George Vogel (left guard), L. P. Collins (center), W. W. Rangeley (right guard), R. C. Potts (right tackle), Joseph Herndon (right end), Robert Frew (quarterback), D. M. Tucker (left halfback), Marv Mattox (right halfback), J. W. McDonald (fullback). The substitutes were: Bernard Arbogast, Eddie Cameron, J. E. Leake, James Kay Thomas, C. L. Walters and D. P. Wingo.

=== NC State ===
NC State vs. VPI

Team	1	2	3	4	Total
NC State	0	0	3	0	3
• VPI	0	0	0	7	7

- Date: November 11, 1921
- Location: League Park
  Norfolk, VA
- Game start: 3:00 p.m.
- Game attendance: 8,000
- Referee: Paul Magoffin

The starting lineup for VPI was: Hardwick (left end), Tilson (left tackle), Moore (left guard), Baker (center), Sheppard (right guard), Hutcheson (right tackle), Wilson (right end), Wallace (quarterback), Sutton (left halfback), Jones (right halfback), Hess (fullback). The substitutes were: Beck, Dean, Rea, Resh, Rhodes and Sherertz.

The starting lineup for NC State was: Samuel Homewood (left end), Averette Floyd (left tackle), Toxey Whitaker (left guard), Thomas Bostian (center), Earl Pasour (right guard), Herbert Weathers (right tackle), William Wearn (right end), J. T. Faucette (quarterback), Nathaniel Pierson (left halfback), Robert Holland (right halfback), Thomas Park (fullback). The substitutes were: David VanSant.

=== Roanoke ===
Roanoke vs. VPI

Team	1	2	3	4	Total
Roanoke	0	0	0	0	0
• VPI	7	7	14	7	35

- Date: November 19, 1921
- Location: Miles Field
  Blacksburg, VA
- Game weather: "Driving rain"
- Referee: Ernest Sampson (St. Albans)

The starting lineup for VPI was: Hardwick (left end), Tilson (left tackle), Rea (left guard), Baker (center), Sherertz (right guard), Hutcheson (right tackle), Wilson (right end), Dean (quarterback), Sutton (left halfback), Wallace (right halfback), Hess (fullback). The substitutes were: Gillette, Owens, Reese, Rhodes, Shankland and Sheppard.

The starting lineup for Roanoke was: H. S. Rice (left end), Thomas Potter (left tackle), Eugene Ould (left guard), Fielding Logan (center), Gordon C. White (right guard), P. H. Neese (right tackle), E. A. Roades (right end), G. M. Caldwell (quarterback), G. S. Stevens (left halfback), Paul Gray (right halfback), M. D. Couk (fullback). The substitutes were: Furman Whitescarver.

=== VMI ===
The starting lineup for VPI was: Hardwick (left end), Tilson (left tackle), Sheppard (left guard), Baker (center), Sherertz (right guard), Hutcheson (right tackle), Wilson (right end), Wallace (quarterback), Sutton (left halfback), Gettle (right halfback), Hess (fullback). The substitutes were: Flory, Jones, Rea, Resh and Rhodes.

The starting lineup for VMI was: William Drewry (left end), Frank Summers (left tackle), William Wescott (left guard), Peter Miller (center), William Harrison (right guard), Robert Hunt (right tackle), Ruxton Ridgely (right end), Worthington Faulkner (quarterback), Jere Bunting (left halfback), Hal Costolo (right halfback), William Shannon (fullback). The substitutes were: Attwell, Edwin Clark, Wallace Douglas, Farley, Thomas Gray, Carl Hammond, Edward Ryder, William Venable and Mortimer Watkins.

== Players ==
=== Roster ===
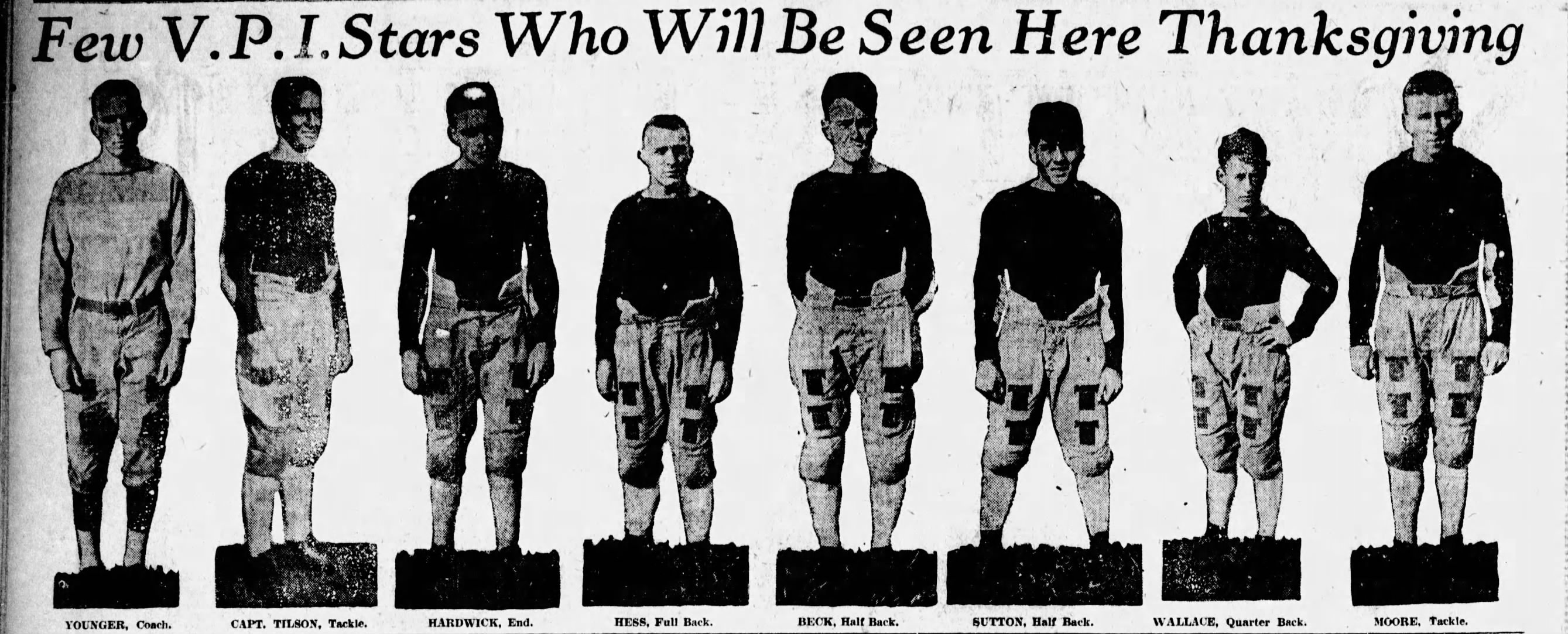
(L–R): Asst. Coach William L. Younger; players Sumner D. Tilson, Hank Hardwick, H. W. Hess, C. O. Beck, Harry McMullen Sutton, John Graham "Rip" Wallace, R. E. Moore

VPI 1921 roster
Robert Lindsay Baker; C. O. Beck; Dean; Cecil Franzen DeLaBarre; Charles Laurence Flory; Herbert Houston Gettle; Gillette; Hank Hardwick; H. W. Hess; Allen Farrar Hutcheson; Melvin Rivers Jones; Linkous; Long; Ralph Erskine Moore	Owens; Robert James Rea; Reese; Franklyn Senator Resh; Charles Douglas Rhodes; Donald Hurt Rutherford; Andrew Nimmo Shankland; Hubert Austin Sheppard; William Shields Sherertz; Harry McMullen Sutton; Sumner D. Tilson (Capt.); John Graham "Rip" Wallace; Victor Peters Wilson

=== Monogram Club members ===
Fifteen players received monograms for their participation on the 1921 VPI team.

Player	Hometown	Notes
Robert Lindsay Baker	Norfolk, Virginia	
Herbert Houston "Pasco" Gettle		
Hank Hardwick	Blacksburg, Virginia	The 22nd head football coach at the United States Naval Academy in Annapolis, Maryland.
H. W. Hess		
Allen Farrar Hutcheson	Boydton, Virginia	
Melvin Rivers Jones	Richmond, Virginia	
Ralph Erskine Moore	Augusta County, Virginia	World War I veteran (USAAS).
Robert James Rea		
Franklyn Senator Resh	Norfolk, Virginia	
Hubert Austin Sheppard	Front Royal, Virginia	
William Shields Sherertz	Roanoke, Virginia	
Harry McMullen Sutton	Suffolk, Virginia	
Sumner D. Tilson	Childress, Texas	VPI's head football coach for one season, in 1942, compiling a record of 7–2–1.
John Graham "Rip" Wallace	Hampton, Virginia	
Victor Peters Wilson	Hampton, Virginia	

== Coaching and training staff ==
- Head coach: B. C. Cubbage
- Assistant coach: William L. Younger
- Graduate Manager: Sally Miles
- Manager: Robert Henry Shultz
- Junior varsity head coach: M. J. Bresnahan
