= Bob Fetzer =

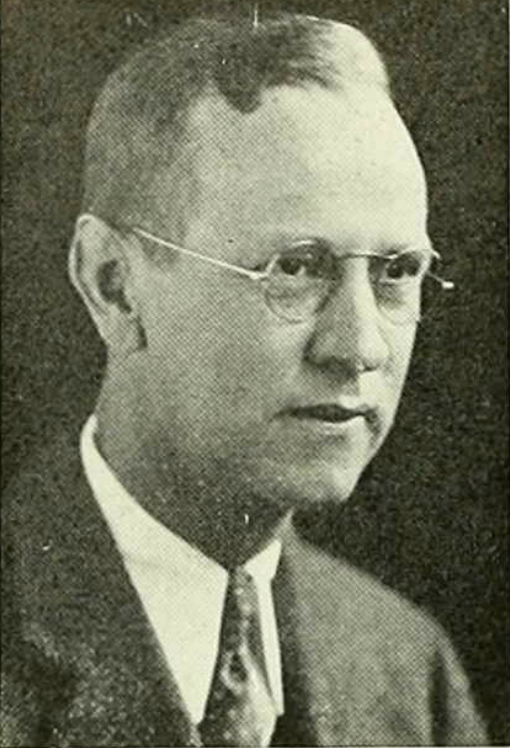
- Fetzer pictured in 1938 Yackety Yack, North Carolina yearbook

Biographical details
- Born: September 9, 1887; Cabarrus County, North Carolina, U.S.
- Died: May 19, 1968 (aged 80); Chapel Hill, North Carolina, U.S.

Coaching career (HC unless noted)

Football
- 1914: Davidson
- 1921–1925: North Carolina
- 1926–1930: North Carolina (assistant)

Track
- 1921–1952: North Carolina

Administrative career (AD unless noted)
- 1923–1952: North Carolina

Head coaching record
- Overall: 35–13–5 (football)

Robert Allison Fetzer (September 9, 1887 – May 19, 1968) was an American football coach, track and field coach, and college athletics administrator. He served as the head football coach at Davidson College in 1914 and as co-head football coach at the University of North Carolina at Chapel Hill with his brother, Bill, from 1921 to 1925, compiling a career college football record of 35–13–5. Fetzer was also the head track coach at North Carolina from 1921 to 1952 and the school's athletic director from 1923 to 1952. He was later the executive secretary of the Morehead Foundation at North Carolina. Fetzer died on May 19, 1968, in Chapel Hill, North Carolina.

== Head coaching record ==
=== Football ===
Year	Team	Overall	Conference	Standing	Bowl/playoffs
Davidson (Independent) (1914)
1914	Davidson	5–1–1			
Davidson:		5–1–1			
North Carolina Tar Heels (Southern Conference) (1921–1925)
1921	North Carolina	5–2–2	2–1	5th	
1922	North Carolina	9–1	5–0	T–1st	
1923	North Carolina	5–3–1	2–1–1	8th	
1924	North Carolina	4–5	2–3	T–14th	
1925	North Carolina	7–1–1	4–0–1	3rd	
North Carolina:		30–12–4	15–5–2		
Total:		35–13–5			
