= 1913 Georgetown Blue and Gray football team =

American college football season

1913 Georgetown Blue and Gray football
- Conference: South Atlantic Intercollegiate Athletic Association
- Record: 4–4 (1–1 SAIAA)
- Head coach: Frank Gargan (2nd season)
- Captain: Harry Costello
- Home stadium: Georgetown Field

1913 South Atlantic Intercollegiate Athletic Association football standings
	Conf.					Overall
Team	W		L		T	W		L		T
North Carolina A&M $	2	–	0	–	0	6	–	1	–	0
Washington and Lee	3	–	1	–	0	8	–	1	–	0
Virginia	1	–	1	–	0	7	–	1	–	0
VPI	1	–	1	–	0	7	–	1	–	1
Georgetown	1	–	1	–	0	4	–	4	–	0
Johns Hopkins	0	–	2	–	0	0	–	3	–	0
North Carolina	0	–	3	–	0	5	–	4	–	0
$ – Conference champion

The 1913 Georgetown Blue and Gray football team represented Georgetown University during the 1913 college football season.

== Schedule ==
Date	Opponent	Site	Result	Source
October 4	Randolph–Macon*	Georgetown Field; Washington, DC	W 44–0	
October 11	at Navy*	Worden Field; Annapolis, MD	L 0–23	
October 18	Virginia Medical*	Georgetown Field; Washington, DC	W 21–0	
October 25	at North Carolina A&M	Riddick Stadium; Raleigh, NC	L 0–12	
November 1	Carlisle*	Georgetown Field; Washington, DC	L 0–34	
November 8	West Virginia Wesleyan*	Georgetown Field; Washington, DC	L 6–16	
November 15	Virginia	Georgetown Field; Washington, DC	W 8–7	
November 22	Holy Cross*	Georgetown Field; Washington, DC	W 16–7	
*Non-conference game
