= 1915 Georgetown Blue and Gray football team =

American college football season

1915 Georgetown Blue and Gray football

SAIAA co-champion
- Conference: South Atlantic Intercollegiate Athletic Association
- Record: 7–2 (2–0 SAIAA)
- Head coach: Albert Exendine (2nd season)
- Captain: James Barron
- Home stadium: Georgetown Field

1915 South Atlantic Intercollegiate Athletic Association football standings
	Conf.					Overall
Team	W		L		T	W		L		T
Virginia +	2	–	0	–	0	8	–	1	–	0
Washington and Lee +	2	–	0	–	0	6	–	1	–	1
Georgetown +	2	–	0	–	0	7	–	2	–	0
Catholic University	1	–	0	–	0	5	–	2	–	0
Johns Hopkins	1	–	0	–	0	1	–	0	–	0
Richmond	0	–	1	–	0	4	–	4	–	1
VPI	0	–	1	–	0	4	–	4	–	0
North Carolina A&M	0	–	2	–	0	3	–	3	–	1
North Carolina	0	–	2	–	0	4	–	3	–	1
+ – Conference co-champions

The 1915 Georgetown Blue and Gray football team was an American football team that represented Georgetown University as a member of the South Atlantic Intercollegiate Athletic Association (SAIAA) during the 1915 college football season. In their second year under head coach Albert Exendine, the team compiled a 7–2 record.

== Schedule ==
Date	Time	Opponent	Site	Result	Attendance	Source
September 25		at Princeton*	Palmer Stadium; Princeton, NJ	L 0–13		
October 2		at Navy*	Worden Field; Annapolis, MD	W 9–0		
October 9		USS Reina Mercedes*	Georgetown Field; Washington, DC	W 58–0		
October 16		North Carolina	Georgetown Field; Washington, DC	W 38–0		
October 23		at Army*	The Plain; West Point, NY	L 0–10		
November 2		at Fordham*	Fordham Field; Bronx, NY	W 33–7	4,000	
November 13		North Carolina A&M	Georgetown Field; Washington, DC	W 28–0		
November 20		South Carolina*	Georgetown Field; Washington, DC	W 61–0		
November 25	3:30 p.m.	at Saint Louis*	Sportsman's Park; St. Louis, MO	W 90–0	3,000	
*Non-conference game
