= 1921 Georgetown Blue and Gray football team =

American college football season

1921 Georgetown Blue and Gray football
- Conference: South Atlantic Intercollegiate Athletic Association
- Record: 8–1 (1–0 SAIAA)
- Head coach: Albert Exendine (8th season)
- Captain: Jack Flavin
- Home stadium: American League Park

1921 South Atlantic Intercollegiate Athletic Association football standings
	Conf.					Overall
Team	W		L		T	W		L		T
Washington and Lee $	2	–	0	–	0	6	–	3	–	0
Georgetown	1	–	0	–	0	8	–	1	–	0
Virginia	5	–	1	–	0	5	–	4	–	0
North Carolina	3	–	1	–	1	5	–	2	–	2
VPI	4	–	2	–	0	7	–	3	–	0
Maryland	2	–	1	–	1	3	–	5	–	1
Richmond	2	–	2	–	1	4	–	3	–	1
Catholic University	2	–	2	–	0	3	–	5	–	0
NC State	1	–	1	–	3	3	–	3	–	3
William & Mary	1	–	3	–	1	4	–	3	–	1
Trinity (NC)	0	–	1	–	0	6	–	1	–	2
Davidson	0	–	1	–	3	3	–	4	–	3
Johns Hopkins	0	–	2	–	0	6	–	3	–	0
VMI	0	–	3	–	1	3	–	5	–	1
George Washington	0	–	3	–	1	3	–	3	–	2
$ – Conference champion

The 1921 Georgetown Blue and Gray football team was an American football team that represented Georgetown University as a member of the South Atlantic Intercollegiate Athletic Association (SAIAA) during the 1921 college football season. In their eighth season under head coach Albert Exendine, the Cardinals compiled a 8–1 record.

== Schedule ==
Date	Opponent	Site	Result	Attendance	Source
October 1	Lebanon Valley*	American League Park; Washington, DC	W 7–0		
October 8	Ursinus*	American League Park; Washington, DC	W 48–6		
October 15	Westminster (PA)*	American League Park; Washington, DC	W 66–0		
October 22	at Holy Cross*	Fitton Field; Worcester, MA	W 28–7	6,000	
October 29	George Washington	American League Park; Washington, DC	W 28–0		
November 5	Fordham*	American League Park; Washington, DC	W 34–7	7,000	
November 12	at Georgia Tech*	Grant Field; Atlanta, GA	L 7–21		
November 19	at Boston College*	Braves Field; Boston, MA	W 14–10	20,000	
November 24	Bethany (WV)*	American League Park; Washington, DC	W 13–0		
*Non-conference game
