= 1915 Virginia Orange and Blue football team =

American college football season

1915 Virginia Orange and Blue football

SAIAA co-champion
- Conference: South Atlantic Intercollegiate Athletic Association
- Record: 8–1 (2–0 SAIAA)
- Head coach: Harry Varner (1st season)
- Captain: Harris Coleman
- Home stadium: Lambeth Field

1915 South Atlantic Intercollegiate Athletic Association football standings
	Conf.					Overall
Team	W		L		T	W		L		T
Virginia +	2	–	0	–	0	8	–	1	–	0
Washington and Lee +	2	–	0	–	0	6	–	1	–	1
Georgetown +	2	–	0	–	0	7	–	2	–	0
Catholic University	1	–	0	–	0	5	–	2	–	0
Johns Hopkins	1	–	0	–	0	1	–	0	–	0
Richmond	0	–	1	–	0	4	–	4	–	1
VPI	0	–	1	–	0	4	–	4	–	0
North Carolina A&M	0	–	2	–	0	3	–	3	–	1
North Carolina	0	–	2	–	0	4	–	3	–	1
+ – Conference co-champions

The 1915 Virginia Orange and Blue football team represented the University of Virginia as a member of the South Atlantic Intercollegiate Athletic Association (SAIAA) during the 1915 college football season. Led by Harry Varner in his first and only season as head coach, the Orange and Blue compiled an overall record of 8–1 with a mark of 2–0 in conference play, sharing the SAIAA title with Georgetown and Washington and Lee. The only blemish on Virginia's record was a loss to Harvard, whose only loss was to New York Times named national champion Cornell.

Virginia outscored its opponents 219–26 on the season, and handily defeated a top Vanderbilt team, 35–10, which had defeated its other nine opponents that season by a combined score of 503–3. UVA's 10–0 win against Yale in the Yale Bowl was the first ever victory against the 26-time national champions for any program from the South. UVA halfback Eugene Mayer was then named the South's first consensus All-American after the season.

Virginia was retroactively named the national champion by James Howell, but the title is unclaimed by the school.

== Schedule ==
Date	Opponent	Site	Result	Source
September 25	Randolph–Macon*	Lambeth Field; Charlottesville, VA	W 20–0	
October 2	at Yale*	Yale Bowl; New Haven, CT	W 10–0	
October 9	Richmond	Lambeth Field; Charlottesville, VA	W 74–0	
October 16	at Harvard*	Harvard Stadium; Boston, MA	L 0–9	
October 23	at Georgia*	Sanford Field; Athens, GA	W 9–7	
October 30	VMI*	Lambeth Field; Charlottesville, VA	W 44–0	
November 6	Vanderbilt*	Lambeth Field; Charlottesville, VA	W 35–10	
November 13	at South Carolina*	Davis Field; Columbia, SC	W 13–0	
November 25	vs. North Carolina	Broad Street Park; Richmond, VA (rivalry)	W 14–0	
*Non-conference game
