= Fred P. Schlichter =

American football player and coach

Playing career
- 1915–1916: Cornell
- Position: Fullback

Coaching career (HC unless noted)
- 1921: Rollins

Accomplishments and honors

Championships
- National (1915)

Fred P. Schlichter was American football player and coach. He served as the head football coach at Rollins College in Winter Park, Florida in 1921. Schlichter played college football at Cornell University in Ithaca, New York.
