= 1913 North Carolina Tar Heels football team =

American college football season

1913 North Carolina Tar Heels football
- Conference: South Atlantic Intercollegiate Athletic Association
- Record: 5–4 (0–3 SAIAA)
- Head coach: Thomas Trenchard (2nd season)
- Captain: L. L. Abernethy
- Home stadium: Campus Athletic Field (II)

1913 South Atlantic Intercollegiate Athletic Association football standings
	Conf.					Overall
Team	W		L		T	W		L		T
North Carolina A&M $	2	–	0	–	0	6	–	1	–	0
Washington and Lee	3	–	1	–	0	8	–	1	–	0
Virginia	1	–	1	–	0	7	–	1	–	0
VPI	1	–	1	–	0	7	–	1	–	1
Georgetown	1	–	1	–	0	4	–	4	–	0
Johns Hopkins	0	–	2	–	0	0	–	3	–	0
North Carolina	0	–	3	–	0	5	–	4	–	0
$ – Conference champion

The 1913 North Carolina Tar Heels football team represented the University of North Carolina in the 1913 college football season. The team captain of the 1913 season was L. L. Albernethy.

== Schedule ==
Date	Time	Opponent	Site	Result	Attendance	Source
September 27		Wake Forest*	Campus Athletic Field (II); Chapel Hill, NC (rivalry)	W 7–0	400	
October 4		Medical College of Virginia*	Campus Athletic Field (II); Chapel Hill, NC	W 15–0		
October 11	3:30 p.m.	vs. Davidson*	Cone Athletic Park (II); Greensboro, NC	W 7–0		
October 18	3:30 p.m.	at South Carolina*	Davis Field; Columbia, SC (rivalry)	W 13–3		
October 25	3:30 p.m.	vs. VPI	Prince Albert Park; Winston-Salem, NC	L 7–14		
November 1	3:15 p.m.	at Georgia*	Sanford Field; Athens, GA	L 6–19	2,500	
November 8		vs. Washington and Lee	Fair Grounds (Lynchburg); Lynchburg, VA	L 0–14		
November 15	3:30 p.m.	vs. Wake Forest*	East Durham Ballpark; Durham, NC	W 29–0		
November 27	2:30 p.m.	vs. Virginia	Broad Street Park (II); Richmond, VA (rivalry)	L 7–26	10,000	
*Non-conference game
