= 1913 North Carolina A&M Aggies football team =

American college football season

1913 North Carolina A&M Aggies football
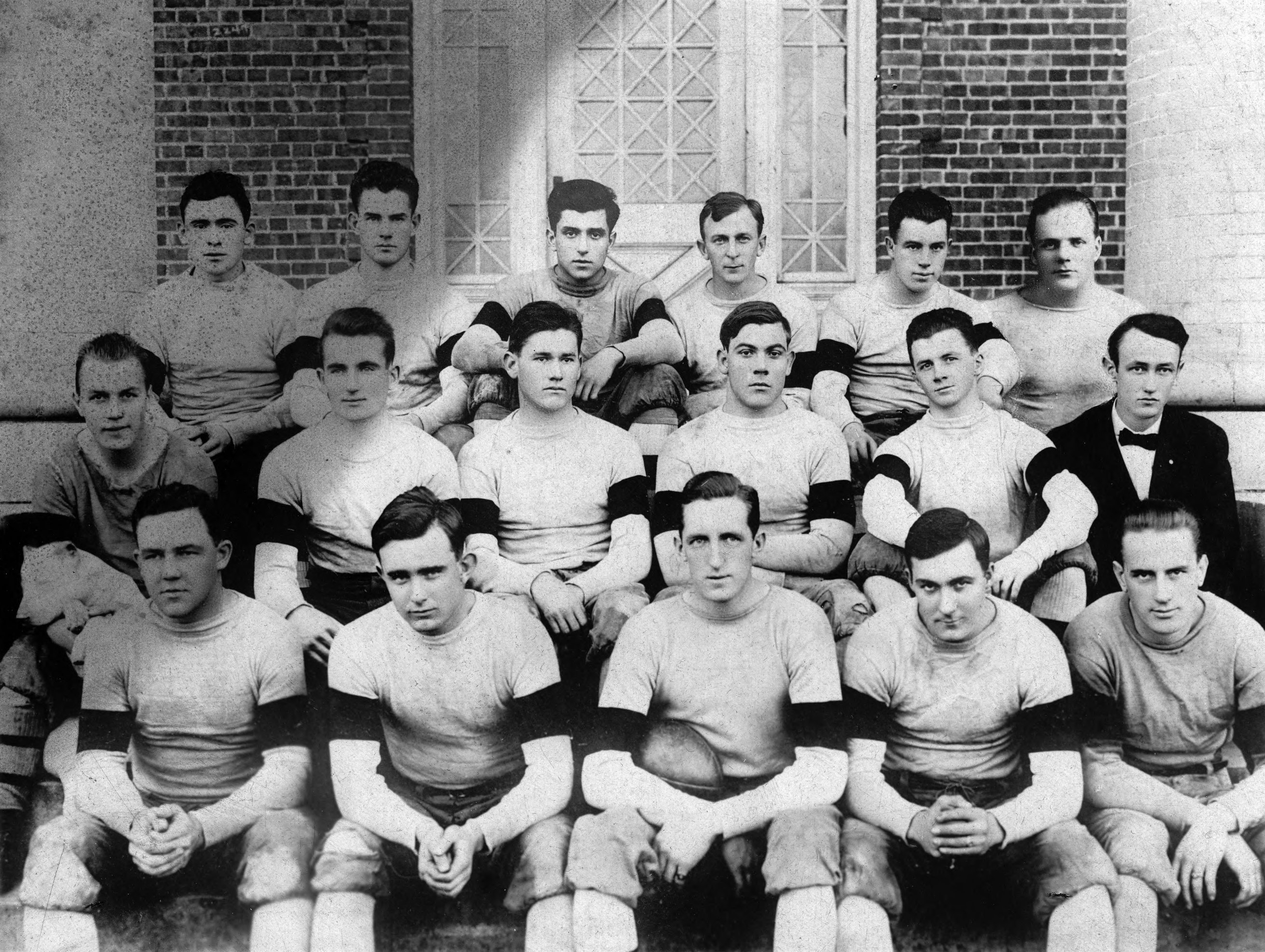

SAIAA champion
- Conference: South Atlantic Intercollegiate Athletic Association
- Record: 6–1 (2–0 SAIAA)
- Head coach: Edward L. Greene (5th season)
- Home stadium: Riddick Stadium

1913 South Atlantic Intercollegiate Athletic Association football standings
	Conf.					Overall
Team	W		L		T	W		L		T
North Carolina A&M $	2	–	0	–	0	6	–	1	–	0
Washington and Lee	3	–	1	–	0	8	–	1	–	0
Virginia	1	–	1	–	0	7	–	1	–	0
VPI	1	–	1	–	0	7	–	1	–	1
Georgetown	1	–	1	–	0	4	–	4	–	0
Johns Hopkins	0	–	1	–	0	3	–	4	–	0
North Carolina	0	–	3	–	0	5	–	4	–	0
$ – Conference champion

The 1913 North Carolina A&M Aggies football team represented the North Carolina A&M Aggies of North Carolina College of Agriculture and Mechanic Arts (now known as North Carolina State University) during the 1913 college football season. The Aggies were coached by Edward L. Greene in his fifth year as head coach, compiling a 6–1 record.

== Schedule ==
Date	Opponent	Site	Result	Attendance	Source
October 4	USS Franklin*	Riddick Stadium; Raleigh, NC	W 54–0		
October 11	Virginia Medical*	Riddick Stadium; Raleigh, NC	W 13–7		
October 18	Davidson*	Riddick Stadium; Raleigh, NC	W 26–6		
October 23	Georgetown	Riddick Stadium; Raleigh, NC	W 12–0		
November 1	Wake Forest*	Riddick Stadium; Raleigh, NC (rivalry)	W 37–0		
November 8	vs. VMI*	Broad Street Park; Richmond, VA	L 7–14	3,000	
November 27	vs. Washington and Lee	League Park; Norfolk, VA	W 6–0		
*Non-conference game
