= 1921 Washington and Lee Generals football team =

American college football season

1921 Washington and Lee Generals football

SAIAA champion
- Conference: South Atlantic Intercollegiate Athletic Association
- Record: 6–3 (2–0 SAIAA)
- Head coach: W. C. Raftery (5th season)
- Home stadium: Wilson Field

1921 South Atlantic Intercollegiate Athletic Association football standings
	Conf.					Overall
Team	W		L		T	W		L		T
Washington and Lee $	2	–	0	–	0	6	–	3	–	0
Georgetown	1	–	0	–	0	8	–	1	–	0
Virginia	5	–	1	–	0	5	–	4	–	0
North Carolina	3	–	1	–	1	5	–	2	–	2
VPI	4	–	2	–	0	7	–	3	–	0
Maryland	2	–	1	–	1	3	–	5	–	1
Richmond	2	–	2	–	1	4	–	3	–	1
Catholic University	2	–	2	–	0	3	–	5	–	0
NC State	1	–	1	–	3	3	–	3	–	3
William & Mary	1	–	3	–	1	4	–	3	–	1
Trinity (NC)	0	–	1	–	0	6	–	1	–	2
Davidson	0	–	1	–	3	3	–	4	–	3
Johns Hopkins	0	–	2	–	0	6	–	3	–	0
VMI	0	–	3	–	1	3	–	5	–	1
George Washington	0	–	3	–	1	3	–	3	–	2
$ – Conference champion

The 1921 Washington and Lee Generals football team represented Washington and Lee University during the 1921 college football season. The Generals competed in the South Atlantic Intercollegiate Athletic Association (SAIAA) and were coached by W. C. Raftery in his fifth year as head coach, compiling a 6–3 record (2–0 SAIAA) and claiming the SAIAA title. The team outscored its opponents 172 to 74.

== Schedule ==
Date	Opponent	Site	Result	Attendance	Source
October 1	Randolph–Macon*	Wilson Field; Lexington, VA	W 41–0		
October 8	Emory and Henry*	Wilson Field; Lexington, VA	W 27–0		
October 15	at Rutgers*	Neilson Field; Piscataway, NJ	L 13–14		
October 22	Morris Harvey*	Wilson Field; Lexington, VA	W 33–7		
October 29	vs. VPI	Fairgrounds; Lynchburg, VA	W 3–0	6,000–6,750	
November 5	vs. West Virginia*	Laidley Field; Charleston, WV	L 7–28	10,000	
November 12	Roanoke*	Wilson Field; Lexington, VA	W 41–0		
November 19	at Centre*	Eclipse Park; Louisville, KY	L 0–25		
November 24	at Johns Hopkins	Homewood Field; Baltimore, MD	W 7–0	2,000	
*Non-conference game
