= Johnny Barrett (American football) =

American football player (1895–1974)

Profile
- Position: Halfback

Personal information
- Born: August 29, 1895
- Died: March 1974 (aged 78)
- Listed height: 5 ft 9 in (1.75 m)
- Listed weight: 195 lb (88 kg)

Career information
- High school: Oak Park (IL)
- College: Washington & Lee

Career history
- Chicago Tigers (1920)

John Barrett (August 29, 1895 – March 1974) was an American football player. He played college football as a prominent halfback for the Washington & Lee Generals, once running 90 yards on Cornell. In 1920 he played for the Chicago Tigers in the inaugural season of the National Football League, then known as the APFA.
