= Dave Tayloe =

American football player and physician (1894–1934)

Profile
- Position: Halfback

Personal information
- Born: September 12, 1894; Washington, North Carolina, U.S.
- Died: September 14, 1934 (aged 40); Washington, North Carolina, U.S.
- Listed height: 6 ft 2 in (1.88 m)
- Listed weight: 180 lb (82 kg)

Career information
- College: North Carolina (1914–1915)

David Thomas Tayloe Jr. (September 12, 1894 – September 14, 1934) was an American college football player and physician.

== College football ==
Tayloe was twice captain of North Carolina Tar Heels football teams. He tied for the longest run of the 1915 college football season with a 90-yard sprint. In 1914, he made Outing magazine's "Football Roll of Honor." That team won all its games by large scores except for the last week when it was defeated by Virginia. The Atlanta Constitution called Tayloe "one of the most brilliant backs in the south today."
