= South Atlantic Intercollegiate Athletic Association =

Former American intercollegiate athletic conference

- Association: NCAA
- Founded: 1912
- Folded: 1921
- Region: Atlantic Coast; Tidewater

The South Atlantic Intercollegiate Athletic Association (SAIAA) was an intercollegiate athletic conference with its main focus of promoting track and arranging track meets. Its member schools were located in the states of Maryland, Virginia, North Carolina, as well as the District of Columbia.

The conference's membership was centered in the South Atlantic region of the United States, which remains in the Southern United States and on the coast of the Atlantic, but is above and contrasted with the Deep South (which had the Southern Intercollegiate Athletic Association). It is sometimes known as the Tidewater region. Several of its members are today in the Atlantic Coast Conference.

The SAIAA was first formed in 1912 and remained active until 1921. The conference disbanded in 1921, and six of its schools became founding members of the Southern Conference along with eight other schools from the southeast United States. Those six SAIAA schools were: North Carolina, North Carolina State, Virginia, Virginia Tech, Maryland and Washington and Lee.

== Membership ==
The following universities were members of the SAIAA at some point during its existence. Where known, the school's name is followed by the period of its membership in the conference. Italicized years indicate a confirmed year of membership, but may not be exhaustive. Track meets were held in 1911, and 1912 was the first season of play for all sports.

- Catholic 1916–1921
- Davidson 1916–1921
- George Washington 1916–1921
- Georgetown 1911–1921
- Johns Hopkins 1911–1921
- Maryland 1916–1921
- North Carolina 1911–1921
- North Carolina State 1911–1921
- Richmond 1911–1921
- St. John's (MD) 1921
- Trinity College 1916–1921
- Virginia 1911–1921
- Virginia Polytechnic Institute 1911–1921
- Virginia Military Institute 1916–1921
- Washington and Lee 1911–1921
- William & Mary 1916–1921

Conference presidents
Name	Years
J. T. England	1912
J. W. H. Pollard	1915–1919

== Football champions ==
There is no evidence in exhaustive searches of newspaper archives that the South Atlantic Intercollegiate Athletic Association ever sanctioned college football. The list of champions has been derived from compiling football records of schools that belonged to the association that sponsored track and field events. The terminology "South Atlantic" was used generically by various publications to describe teams in the Maryland, Washington, D.C., Virginia and North Carolina area.

Year	Champion
1912	Georgetown
1913	North Carolina A&M
1914	Washington and Lee & Virginia
1915	Georgetown, Virginia, & Washington and Lee
1916	VPI
1917	Georgetown
1918	VPI
1919	Georgetown
1920	VMI
1921	Washington and Lee

== See also ==
- College Football All-Southern Team
