= Rammy Ramsdell =

American sportsperson (1894–1977)

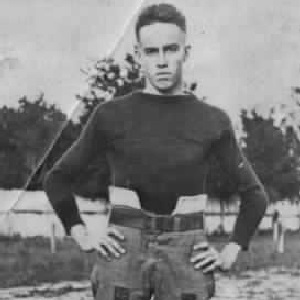
- Ramsdell in football uniform

Profile
- Position: Quarterback

Personal information
- Born: November 6, 1894; Ocala, Florida, U.S.
- Died: April 14, 1977 (aged 82); Plant City, Florida, U.S.
- Listed height: 5 ft 10 in (1.78 m)
- Listed weight: 150 lb (68 kg)

Career information
- High school: Hillsborough
- College: Florida (1913–1915)

Awards and highlights
- All-time Florida team (1927); University of Florida Athletic Hall of Fame

Ashley Wakefield "Rammy" Ramsdell (November 6, 1894 – April 14, 1977) was a college football, baseball, and basketball player and track athlete for the Florida Gators of the University of Florida. Ramsdell's athletic career was prematurely ended when he broke his leg playing baseball at the end of his junior year. He was the first scholarship athlete at the University of Florida. According to one writer "the Gators' first quarterback of note," he is the oldest player at the position in the University of Florida Athletic Hall of Fame, inducted in 1971. He was picked for an all-time Florida team at the position in 1927.

== Early life ==
Ashley Wakefield Ramsdell was born on November 6, 1894, in Ocala, Florida. He attended Hillsborough High School in Tampa, class of 1913. Future Gator teammate Rex Farrior also attended. As an end on the football team, Ramsdell dropped a pass to tie the state championship game. The basketball team however did win a state title. Ramsdell is in the school's hall of fame.

== University of Florida ==
Ramsdell attended the University of Florida in Gainesville, Florida, where he played several sports for the Florida Gators. Ramsdell was the starting quarterback for two seasons on the football team, a centerfielder on the baseball team, and a member of Florida's first basketball squad.

Ramsdell began his collegiate athletic career on Florida's freshman football team, when he was taught the quarterback position by coach and former Gator quarterback Bob Shackleford. Then he played for coaches George E. Pyle and C. J. McCoy on the varsity Florida Gators football team from 1913 to 1915. The highlight of his football career was a 60-yard touchdown run in the rain to defeat Tulane in 1915. Ramsdell also scored four touchdowns in the game with Mercer that year.

While running the bases during a baseball game against Auburn in 1915, Ramsdell accidentally stepped on the foot of first baseman George Steed and got his spikes caught in Steed's laces, which resulted in Ramsdell breaking his left leg with "a loud cracking noise". The serious injury ended Ramsdell's collegiate athletic career. Without their projected starting quarterback, the Gator football team went 0–5 and did not score a touchdown during the subsequent 1916 season.

== Later life ==
Ramsdell married Geneva E. Mosley on June 2, 1917. Their daughter Jean was a Tampa philanthropist. Ramsdell's First World War registration says he is a schoolteacher in Tampa. He later settled in Plant City and owned a trucking company. After a stroke in 1950, he sold the business.

== See also ==
- List of University of Florida Athletic Hall of Fame members
