= Hershel B. Northcutt =

Biographical details
- Born: September 12, 1892
- Died: February 24, 1971 (aged 78)
- Education: Memphis, Tennessee, U.S.

Playing career
- 1915: Vanderbilt
- Position: Quarterback

Coaching career (HC unless noted)

Football
- 1920: Columbia Military Academy (TN)
- 1922–1923: Hendrix

Men's basketball
- 1922–1924: Hendrix

Women's basketball
- 1922–1924: Hendrix

Head coaching record
- Overall: 9–10 (football); 20–9 (men's basketball); 10–2–1 (women's basketball)

Hershel B. "Cutter" Northcutt (September 12, 1892 – February 24, 1971) was an American football and basketball coach and college athlete.

== College athlete ==
As a college athlete at the Vanderbilt University, Northcutt was part of the 1915 squad that won the 1915 SIAA conference championship under head coach Dan McGugin.

== College coach ==
Northcutt then spent time as the head football coach at Columbia Military Academy in Columbia, Tennessee before becoming the head football and women's basketball coach at Hendrix College in Conway, Arkansas for two seasons.

== Later life and death ==
Northcutt founded East End Lumber Co. in 1925. He died on February 24, 1971, at a hospital in Memphis, Tennessee.

== Head coaching record ==
=== Football ===
Year	Team	Overall	Conference	Standing	Bowl/playoffs
Hendrix Bulldogs (Independent) (1922–1923)
1922	Hendrix	4–6			
1923	Hendrix	5–4			
Hendrix:		9–10			
Total:		9–10			
