= 1915 Chattanooga Moccasins football team =

American college football season

1915 Chattanooga Moccasins football
- Conference: Southern Intercollegiate Athletic Association
- Record: 5–2–2 (3–1–2 SIAA)
- Head coach: Johnny Spiegel (1st season)
- Captain: Edwin Woodworth
- Home stadium: Chamberlain Field

1915 Southern Intercollegiate Athletic Association football standings
	Conf.					Overall
Team	W		L		T	W		L		T
Vanderbilt $	5	–	0	–	0	9	–	1	–	0
Alabama	5	–	0	–	0	6	–	2	–	0
LSU	4	–	0	–	0	6	–	2	–	0
Transylvania	3	–	0	–	1	7	–	1	–	1
Auburn	5	–	1	–	0	6	–	2	–	0
Georgia	3	–	1	–	1	5	–	2	–	2
Chattanooga	3	–	1	–	2	5	–	2	–	2
Mississippi A&M	4	–	2	–	1	5	–	2	–	1
Kentucky	2	–	1	–	1	6	–	1	–	1
Florida	3	–	3	–	0	4	–	3	–	0
Clemson	2	–	2	–	1	2	–	4	–	2
South Carolina	1	–	1	–	1	5	–	3	–	1
Furman	1	–	1	–	0	5	–	3	–	0
Mercer	2	–	3	–	0	5	–	4	–	0
Mississippi College	2	–	3	–	0	4	–	4	–	1
The Citadel	1	–	2	–	0	5	–	3	–	0
Sewanee	1	–	2	–	2	4	–	3	–	2
Tennessee	1	–	4	–	0	4	–	4	–	0
Tulane	1	–	4	–	0	4	–	4	–	0
Central University	0	–	3	–	1	3	–	5	–	1
Louisville	0	–	3	–	1	1	–	5	–	1
Howard (AL)	0	–	3	–	0	3	–	4	–	1
Wofford	0	–	3	–	0	3	–	5	–	0
Ole Miss	0	–	5	–	0	2	–	6	–	0
$ – Conference champion

The 1915 Chattanooga Moccasins football team represented the University of Chattanooga—now known as the University of Tennessee at Chattanooga—during the 1915 Southern Intercollegiate Athletic Association football season. Led by first-year head coach Johnny Spiegel, the Moccasins compiled an overall record of 5–2–2 with a mark of 3–1–2 in conference play.

== Schedule ==
Date	Opponent	Site	Result	Source
September 25	at Rhea High School	Dayton, TN	W 21–0	
October 2	Carson–Newman	Chamberlain Field; Chattanooga, TN	W 93–0	
October 9	Georgia	Chamberlain Field; Chattanooga, TN	T 6–6	
October 16	at Louisville	Eclipse Park; Louisville, KY	W 21–6	
October 23	Mercer	Chamberlain Field; Chattanooga, TN	W 20–6	
October 30	at Maryville (TN)	Maryville, TN	L 0–13	
November 6	Transylvania	Chamberlain Field; Chattanooga, TN	L 0–17	
November 13	Sewanee	Andrews Field (site of Engel Stadium); Chattanooga, TN	T 0–0	
November 25	Central University	Chamberlain Field; Chattanooga, TN	W 33–0	
