= Z. J. Stanley =

Biographical details
- Born: April 16, 1892; Liberty, Indiana, US
- Died: January 23, 1952 (aged 59)

Playing career
- 1911–1913: Earlham
- Position: End

Coaching career (HC unless noted)
- 1914: Maryville (TN)
- 1915: Florida (assistant)

Head coaching record
- Overall: 6–4

Zachariah Jay Stanley (April 16, 1892 – January 23, 1952) was an American attorney and college football and basketball player and coach. He played at Earlham College, and was the head coach of the Maryville Scots in 1914. "He developed a strong football team, which, in the face of numerous injuries, finished the season with a good record." In 1915, he assisted the Florida Gators football team, attending law school at UF.

== Head coaching record ==
Year	Team	Overall	Conference	Standing	Bowl/playoffs
Maryville Scots (Independent) (1914)
1914	Maryville	6–4			
Maryville:		6–4			
Total:		6–4			
