= 1915 Wofford Terriers football team =

American college football season

1915 Wofford Terriers football
- Conference: Southern Intercollegiate Athletic Association
- Record: 3–5 (0–3 SIAA)
- Head coach: Harvey Hester (1st season)

1915 Southern Intercollegiate Athletic Association football standings
	Conf.					Overall
Team	W		L		T	W		L		T
Vanderbilt $	5	–	0	–	0	9	–	1	–	0
Alabama	5	–	0	–	0	6	–	2	–	0
LSU	4	–	0	–	0	6	–	2	–	0
Transylvania	3	–	0	–	1	7	–	1	–	1
Auburn	5	–	1	–	0	6	–	2	–	0
Georgia	3	–	1	–	1	5	–	2	–	2
Chattanooga	3	–	1	–	2	5	–	2	–	2
Mississippi A&M	4	–	2	–	1	5	–	2	–	1
Kentucky	2	–	1	–	1	6	–	1	–	1
Florida	3	–	3	–	0	4	–	3	–	0
Clemson	2	–	2	–	1	2	–	4	–	2
South Carolina	1	–	1	–	1	5	–	3	–	1
Furman	1	–	1	–	0	5	–	3	–	0
Mercer	2	–	3	–	0	5	–	4	–	0
Mississippi College	2	–	3	–	0	4	–	4	–	1
The Citadel	1	–	2	–	0	5	–	3	–	0
Sewanee	1	–	2	–	2	4	–	3	–	2
Tennessee	1	–	4	–	0	4	–	4	–	0
Tulane	1	–	4	–	0	4	–	4	–	0
Central University	0	–	3	–	1	3	–	5	–	1
Louisville	0	–	3	–	1	1	–	5	–	1
Howard (AL)	0	–	3	–	0	3	–	4	–	1
Wofford	0	–	3	–	0	3	–	5	–	0
Ole Miss	0	–	5	–	0	2	–	6	–	0
$ – Conference champion

The 1915 Wofford Terriers football team represented Wofford College as a member the Southern Intercollegiate Athletic Association (SIAA) during the 1915 college football season. Led by first-year head coach Harvey Hester, the team compiled an overall record of 3–5, with a mark of 0–3 in conference play.

== Schedule ==
Date	Opponent	Site	Result	Attendance	Source
October 2	Presbyterian*	Spartanburg, SC	L 6–17		
October 11	at Mercer	Central City Park; Macon, GA	L 0–6		
October 16	at Davidson*	Sprunt Athletic Field; Davidson, NC	L 0–45		
October 22	Erskine*	Spartanburg, SC	W 13–3		
October 27	at Newberry*	Newberry Diamond; Newberry, SC	W 10–7		
November 4	South Carolina	Spartanburg Fairgrounds; Spartanburg, SC	L 6–33		
November 10	Cumberland (TN)*	Spartanburg, SC	W 2–0		
November 25	at Furman	Augusta Street Park; Greenville, SC (rivalry)	L 0–25	1,000	
*Non-conference game
