= 1915 Tennessee Volunteers football team =

American college football season

1915 Tennessee Volunteers football
- Conference: Southern Intercollegiate Athletic Association
- Record: 4–4 (1–4 SIAA)
- Head coach: Zora Clevenger (5th season)
- Offensive scheme: Straight T
- Base defense: Multiple
- Captain: Evan McLean
- Home stadium: Waite Field

1915 Southern Intercollegiate Athletic Association football standings
	Conf.					Overall
Team	W		L		T	W		L		T
Vanderbilt $	5	–	0	–	0	9	–	1	–	0
Alabama	5	–	0	–	0	6	–	2	–	0
LSU	4	–	0	–	0	6	–	2	–	0
Transylvania	3	–	0	–	1	7	–	1	–	1
Auburn	5	–	1	–	0	6	–	2	–	0
Georgia	3	–	1	–	1	5	–	2	–	2
Chattanooga	3	–	1	–	2	5	–	2	–	2
Mississippi A&M	4	–	2	–	1	5	–	2	–	1
Kentucky	2	–	1	–	1	6	–	1	–	1
Florida	3	–	3	–	0	4	–	3	–	0
Clemson	2	–	2	–	1	2	–	4	–	2
South Carolina	1	–	1	–	1	5	–	3	–	1
Furman	1	–	1	–	0	5	–	3	–	0
Mercer	2	–	3	–	0	5	–	4	–	0
Mississippi College	2	–	3	–	0	4	–	4	–	1
The Citadel	1	–	2	–	0	5	–	3	–	0
Sewanee	1	–	2	–	2	4	–	3	–	2
Tennessee	1	–	4	–	0	4	–	4	–	0
Tulane	1	–	4	–	0	4	–	4	–	0
Central University	0	–	3	–	1	3	–	5	–	1
Louisville	0	–	3	–	1	1	–	5	–	1
Howard (AL)	0	–	3	–	0	3	–	4	–	1
Wofford	0	–	3	–	0	3	–	5	–	0
Ole Miss	0	–	5	–	0	2	–	6	–	0
$ – Conference champion

The 1915 Tennessee Volunteers football team represented the University of Tennessee in the 1915 college football season. Zora Clevenger served his fifth and final season as head coach before leaving for Kansas State. The 1915 Vols went 4–4. Tennessee's loss to Clemson on October 9 ended a 12-game winning streak that spanned back to the final game of the 1913 season.

== Schedule ==
Date	Opponent	Site	Result	Source
September 25	Carson–Newman*	Waite Field; Knoxville, TN	W 101–0	
October 2	Tusculum*	Waite Field; Knoxville, TN	W 21–0	
October 9	Clemson	Waite Field; Knoxville, TN	L 0–3	
October 16	Central University	Waite Field; Knoxville, TN	W 80–0	
October 23	Cumberland (TN)*	Waite Field; Knoxville, TN	W 101–0	
October 30	at Vanderbilt	Dudley Field; Nashville, TN (rivalry)	L 0–35	
November 13	Mississippi A&M	Waite Field; Knoxville, TN	L 0–14	
November 25	at Kentucky	Stoll Field; Lexington, KY (rivalry)	L 0–6	
*Non-conference game
