= 1915 Sewanee Tigers football team =

American college football season

1915 Sewanee Tigers football
- Conference: Southern Intercollegiate Athletic Association
- Record: 4–3–2 (1–2–2 SIAA)
- Head coach: Harris G. Cope (7th season)
- Captain: Bob Taylor Dobbins
- Home stadium: Hardee Field

Uniform
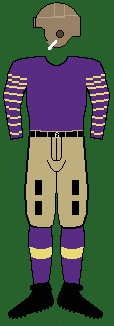

1915 Southern Intercollegiate Athletic Association football standings
	Conf.					Overall
Team	W		L		T	W		L		T
Vanderbilt $	5	–	0	–	0	9	–	1	–	0
Alabama	5	–	0	–	0	6	–	2	–	0
LSU	4	–	0	–	0	6	–	2	–	0
Transylvania	3	–	0	–	1	7	–	1	–	1
Auburn	5	–	1	–	0	6	–	2	–	0
Georgia	3	–	1	–	1	5	–	2	–	2
Chattanooga	3	–	1	–	2	5	–	2	–	2
Mississippi A&M	4	–	2	–	1	5	–	2	–	1
Kentucky	2	–	1	–	1	6	–	1	–	1
Florida	3	–	3	–	0	4	–	3	–	0
Clemson	2	–	2	–	1	2	–	4	–	2
South Carolina	1	–	1	–	1	5	–	3	–	1
Furman	1	–	1	–	0	5	–	3	–	0
Mercer	2	–	3	–	0	5	–	4	–	0
Mississippi College	2	–	3	–	0	4	–	4	–	1
The Citadel	1	–	2	–	0	5	–	3	–	0
Sewanee	1	–	2	–	2	4	–	3	–	2
Tennessee	1	–	4	–	0	4	–	4	–	0
Tulane	1	–	4	–	0	4	–	4	–	0
Central University	0	–	3	–	1	3	–	5	–	1
Louisville	0	–	3	–	1	1	–	5	–	1
Howard (AL)	0	–	3	–	0	3	–	4	–	1
Wofford	0	–	3	–	0	3	–	5	–	0
Ole Miss	0	–	5	–	0	2	–	6	–	0
$ – Conference champion

The 1915 Sewanee Tigers football team represented Sewanee: The University of the South during the 1915 college football season as a member of the Southern Intercollegiate Athletic Association (SIAA). The Tigers were led by head coach Harris G. Cope in his seventh season and finished with a record of four wins, three losses, and two ties (4–3–2 overall, 1–2–2 in the SIAA).

== Schedule ==
Date	Opponent	Site	Result	Attendance	Source
October 2	Morgan Training School*	Hardee Field; Sewanee, TN	W 57–0		
October 9	Cumberland (TN)*	Hardee Field; Sewanee, TN	W 47–0		
October 16	at Florida	Barrs Field; Jacksonville, FL	W 7–0		
October 23	at Kentucky	Stoll Field; Lexington, KY	T 7–7	5,000	
October 30	at Alabama	Rickwood Field; Birmingham, AL	L 10–23		
November 6	vs. Texas*	West End Park; Houston, TX	L 6–27		
November 8	at Baylor*	Cotton Palace; Waco, TX	W 16–3		
November 13	at Chattanooga	Andrews Field; Chattanooga, TN	T 0–0		
November 25	at Vanderbilt	Dudley Field; Nashville, TN (rivalry)	L 3–27		
*Non-conference game
