= 1915 Mississippi A&M Aggies football team =

American college football season

1915 Mississippi A&M Aggies football
- Conference: Southern Intercollegiate Athletic Association
- Record: 5–2–1 (4–2–1 SIAA)
- Head coach: Earl C. Hayes (2nd season)
- Home stadium: New Athletic Field

1915 Southern Intercollegiate Athletic Association football standings
	Conf.					Overall
Team	W		L		T	W		L		T
Vanderbilt $	5	–	0	–	0	9	–	1	–	0
Alabama	5	–	0	–	0	6	–	2	–	0
LSU	4	–	0	–	0	6	–	2	–	0
Transylvania	3	–	0	–	1	7	–	1	–	1
Auburn	5	–	1	–	0	6	–	2	–	0
Georgia	3	–	1	–	1	5	–	2	–	2
Chattanooga	3	–	1	–	2	5	–	2	–	2
Mississippi A&M	4	–	2	–	1	5	–	2	–	1
Kentucky	2	–	1	–	1	6	–	1	–	1
Florida	3	–	3	–	0	4	–	3	–	0
Clemson	2	–	2	–	1	2	–	4	–	2
South Carolina	1	–	1	–	1	5	–	3	–	1
Furman	1	–	1	–	0	5	–	3	–	0
Mercer	2	–	3	–	0	5	–	4	–	0
Mississippi College	2	–	3	–	0	4	–	4	–	1
The Citadel	1	–	2	–	0	5	–	3	–	0
Sewanee	1	–	2	–	2	4	–	3	–	2
Tennessee	1	–	4	–	0	4	–	4	–	0
Tulane	1	–	4	–	0	4	–	4	–	0
Central University	0	–	3	–	1	3	–	5	–	1
Louisville	0	–	3	–	1	1	–	5	–	1
Howard (AL)	0	–	3	–	0	3	–	4	–	1
Wofford	0	–	3	–	0	3	–	5	–	0
Ole Miss	0	–	5	–	0	2	–	6	–	0
$ – Conference champion

The 1915 Mississippi A&M Aggies football team represented The Agricultural and Mechanical College of the State of Mississippi (now known as Mississippi State University) as a member of the Southern Intercollegiate Athletic Association (SIAA) during the 1915 college football season. Led by second-year head coach Earl C. Hayes, the Aggies compiled an overall record of 5–2–1, with a mark of 4–2–1 in conference play. Mississippi A&M played home games at the New Athletic Field in Starkville, Mississippi.

== Schedule ==
Date	Opponent	Site	Result	Source
October 2	vs. Mississippi College	State Fairgrounds; Jackson, MS	W 12–0	
October 9	Transylvania	New Athletic Field; Starkville, MS	T 0–0	
October 16	Kentucky	New Athletic Field; Starkville, MS	W 12–0	
October 23	at Auburn	Rickwood Field; Birmingham, AL	L 0–26	
October 30	at LSU	State Field; Baton Rouge, LA (rivalry)	L 0–10	
November 6	vs. Ole Miss	Fair Grounds; Tupelo, MS (rivalry)	W 65–0	
November 13	at Tennessee	Waite Field; Knoxville, TN	W 14–0	
November 25	at Texas A&M*	Kyle Field; College Station, TX	W 7–0	
*Non-conference game
