= 1915 Mississippi College Collegians football team =

American college football season

1915 Mississippi College Collegians football
- Conference: Southern Intercollegiate Athletic Association
- Record: 4–3–1 (2–3 SIAA)
- Head coach: Dana X. Bible (3rd season)
- Home stadium: Provine Field

1915 Southern Intercollegiate Athletic Association football standings
	Conf.					Overall
Team	W		L		T	W		L		T
Vanderbilt $	5	–	0	–	0	9	–	1	–	0
Alabama	5	–	0	–	0	6	–	2	–	0
LSU	4	–	0	–	0	6	–	2	–	0
Transylvania	3	–	0	–	1	7	–	1	–	1
Auburn	5	–	1	–	0	6	–	2	–	0
Georgia	3	–	1	–	1	5	–	2	–	2
Chattanooga	3	–	1	–	2	5	–	2	–	2
Mississippi A&M	4	–	2	–	1	5	–	2	–	1
Kentucky	2	–	1	–	1	6	–	1	–	1
Florida	3	–	3	–	0	4	–	3	–	0
Clemson	2	–	2	–	1	2	–	4	–	2
South Carolina	1	–	1	–	1	5	–	3	–	1
Furman	1	–	1	–	0	5	–	3	–	0
Mercer	2	–	3	–	0	5	–	4	–	0
Mississippi College	2	–	3	–	0	4	–	4	–	1
The Citadel	1	–	2	–	0	5	–	3	–	0
Sewanee	1	–	2	–	2	4	–	3	–	2
Tennessee	1	–	4	–	0	4	–	4	–	0
Tulane	1	–	4	–	0	4	–	4	–	0
Central University	0	–	3	–	1	3	–	5	–	1
Louisville	0	–	3	–	1	1	–	5	–	1
Howard (AL)	0	–	3	–	0	3	–	4	–	1
Wofford	0	–	3	–	0	3	–	5	–	0
Ole Miss	0	–	5	–	0	2	–	6	–	0
$ – Conference champion

The 1915 Mississippi College Collegians football team was an American football team that represented Mississippi College as a member of the Southern Intercollegiate Athletic Association (SIAA) during the 1915 college football season. In their third year under head coach Dana X. Bible, the team compiled a 4–3–1 record.

== Schedule ==
Date	Opponent	Site	Result	Source
September 24	Chamberlain-Hunt Academy*	Provine Field; Clinton, MS	W 28–0	
October 2	vs. Mississippi A&M	State Fairgrounds; Jackson, MS	L 12–0	
October 9	at LSU	State Field; Baton Rouge, LA	L 14–0	
October 16	at Alabama	University Field; Tuscaloosa, AL	L 40–0	
October 23	Mississippi Normal	Provine Field; Clinton, MS	W 55–7	
October 30	at Tulane	Tulane Stadium; New Orleans, LA	W 20–6	
November 13	vs. Ole Miss	State Fairgrounds; Jackson, MS	W 74–6	
November 20	at Louisiana Industrial*	Athletic Field; Ruston, LA	T 0–0	
November 25	at Ouachita Baptist	Arkadelphia, AR	Cancelled	
*Non-conference game
