= Norman B. Edgerton =

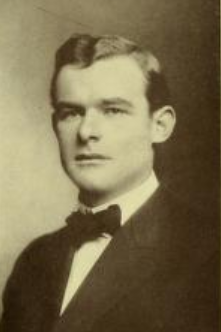
- Edgerton pictured in Quips & Cranks, 1909, Davidson yearbook

Biographical details
- Born: June 11, 1887; Fremont, North Carolina, U.S.
- Died: June 16, 1925 (aged 38); Columbia, South Carolina, U.S.

Playing career
- 1906–1908: Davidson
- Position: Center

Coaching career (HC unless noted)
- 1912–1915: South Carolina
- 1922–1923: South Carolina (line)

Administrative career (AD unless noted)
- 1912–1915: South Carolina

Head coaching record
- Overall: 19–13–3

Norman Bruce "Red" Edgerton (June 11, 1887 – June 16, 1925) was an American college football coach, athletics administrator, and physician. He served as the head football coach at the University of South Carolina at Columbia, South Carolina from 1912 to 1915, compiling a record of 19–13–3. Edgerton was the athletic director at South Carolina during that same span.

Edgerton was born on June 11, 1887, in Fremont, North Carolina, and grew up in New Bern, North Carolina. He played college football at Davidson College in Davidson, North Carolina, before graduating in 1909. He then attended the Medical College of South Carolina—now known as the Medical University of South Carolina—in Charleston, South Carolina.

Edgerton died of pneumonia, on June 16, 1925, at this home in Columbia, South Carolina.

== Head coaching record ==
Year	Team	Overall	Conference	Standing	Bowl/playoffs
South Carolina Gamecocks (Independent) (1912–1914)
1912	South Carolina	5–2–1			
1913	South Carolina	4–3			
1914	South Carolina	5–5–1			
South Carolina Gamecocks (Southern Intercollegiate Athletic Association) (1915)
1915	South Carolina	5–3–1	1–1–1	T–13th	
South Carolina:		19–13–3	1–1–1		
Total:		19–13–3			
