= 1915 Vanderbilt Commodores football team =

American college football season

1915 Vanderbilt Commodores football
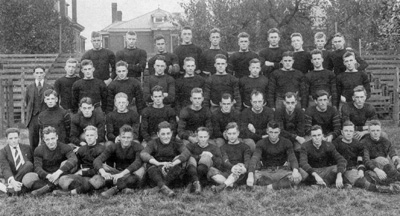

SIAA champion
- Conference: Southern Intercollegiate Athletic Association
- Record: 9–1 (5–0 SIAA)
- Head coach: Dan McGugin (12th season)
- Offensive scheme: Short punt
- Captain: Russ Cohen
- Home stadium: Dudley Field

1915 Southern Intercollegiate Athletic Association football standings
	Conf.					Overall
Team	W		L		T	W		L		T
Vanderbilt $	5	–	0	–	0	9	–	1	–	0
Alabama	5	–	0	–	0	6	–	2	–	0
LSU	4	–	0	–	0	6	–	2	–	0
Transylvania	3	–	0	–	1	7	–	1	–	1
Auburn	5	–	1	–	0	6	–	2	–	0
Georgia	3	–	1	–	1	5	–	2	–	2
Chattanooga	3	–	1	–	2	5	–	2	–	2
Mississippi A&M	4	–	2	–	1	5	–	2	–	1
Kentucky	2	–	1	–	1	6	–	1	–	1
Florida	3	–	3	–	0	4	–	3	–	0
Clemson	2	–	2	–	1	2	–	4	–	2
South Carolina	1	–	1	–	1	5	–	3	–	1
Furman	1	–	1	–	0	5	–	3	–	0
Mercer	2	–	3	–	0	5	–	4	–	0
Mississippi College	2	–	3	–	0	4	–	4	–	1
The Citadel	1	–	2	–	0	5	–	3	–	0
Sewanee	1	–	2	–	2	4	–	3	–	2
Tennessee	1	–	4	–	0	4	–	4	–	0
Tulane	1	–	4	–	0	4	–	4	–	0
Central University	0	–	3	–	1	3	–	5	–	1
Louisville	0	–	3	–	1	1	–	5	–	1
Howard (AL)	0	–	3	–	0	3	–	4	–	1
Wofford	0	–	3	–	0	3	–	5	–	0
Ole Miss	0	–	5	–	0	2	–	6	–	0
$ – Conference champion

The 1915 Vanderbilt Commodores football team represented Vanderbilt University during the 1915 Southern Intercollegiate Athletic Association football season. Dan McGugin served his 12th season as the Commodores' head coach. Vanderbilt was a member of the SIAA. They faced a 10-game schedule. Vanderbilt scored 459 points in its first seven shutout games, and 514 points in 510 minutes of actual playing time by season's end, making it a legitimate "point-a-minute team" leading the nation in scoring with a school record still unequaled today.

Several notable players featured on the team. McGugin built his 1915 squad around a 130-pound junior quarterback Irby "Rabbit" Curry. In the line was sophomore tackle Josh Cody, "a fierce tackler and dominating blocker," who was also the team's kicker. Cody was selected third-team All-America by Walter Camp. The team's captain was end Russ Cohen.

== Schedule ==
Date	Time	Opponent	Site	Result	Source
September 25		Middle Tennessee State Normal*	Dudley Field; Nashville, TN	W 51–0	
October 2		Southwestern Presbyterian*	Dudley Field; Nashville, TN	W 47–0	
October 9	3:15 p.m.	Georgetown (KY)	Dudley Field; Nashville, TN	W 75–0	
October 13	4:00 p.m.	Cumberland (TN)*	Dudley Field; Nashville, TN	W 60–0	
October 16		Henderson-Brown*	Dudley Field; Nashville, TN	W 100–0	
October 23		vs. Ole Miss	Russwood Park; Memphis, TN (rivalry)	W 91–0	
October 30	2:45 p.m.	Tennessee	Dudley Field; Nashville, TN (rivalry)	W 35–0	
November 6		at Virginia*	Lambeth Field; Charlottesville, VA	L 10–35	
November 13		at Auburn	Rickwood Field; Birmingham, AL	W 17–0	
November 25	2:00 p.m.	Sewanee	Dudley Field; Nashville, TN (rivalry)	W 27–3	
*Non-conference game

== Before the season ==
The outlook for the upcoming 1915 Vanderbilt football season was not promising. The Commodores were coming off a losing record of 2–8, the first under head coach Dan McGugin, and the second in the school's 25 years of playing football. Additionally, only 10 experienced players from the previous year were returning to the team. Despite the one-platoon system with players featuring on offense, defense, and special teams used in 1915, this meant inexperienced freshmen would be a key to the team's success.

Coach McGugin was assisted by doctor and former Vanderbilt athlete Owsley Manier.

== Game summaries ==
=== Middle Tennessee State Normal ===
Middle Tennessee Normal at Vanderbilt

Team	1	2	3	4	Total
Normal	0	0	0	0	0
• Vanderbilt	7	6	32	6	51

- Date: September 26
- Location: Dudley Field
  Nashville, Tennessee
- Referee: Ed Hamilton

Using conventional football, Vanderbilt opened the season with an easy win over Middle Tennessee Normal (MTSU) 51–0. Coach McGugin sent in his substitutes at the beginning of the fourth quarter. The starting lineup was Richardson (left end), Cody (left tackle), Reyer (left guard), Williams (center), Putnam (right guard), Lipscomb (right tackle), Cohen (right end), Curry (quarterback), Zerfoss (left halfback), Wiggs (right halfback), and King (fullback).

=== Southwestern ===
In the second week of play, Vanderbilt defeated Southwestern 47–0 on a slippery field. All points were scored in the first half.

=== Georgetown ===
Georgetown at Vanderbilt

Team	1	2	3	4	Total
Georgetown	0	0	0	0	0
• Vanderbilt	14	0	50	11	75

- Date: October 9
- Location: Dudley Field
  Nashville, Tennessee
- Referee: Bradley Walker

Vanderbilt beat the Georgetown Tigers 75–0. The Commodores racked up 11 touchdowns and 8 field goals, its largest score in three years. "Dough" Ray scored four times and Hubert Wiggs three times. The starting lineup was Williams (left end), Cody (left tackle), Hamilton (left guard), Reyer (center), Lipscomb (right guard), Putnam (right tackle), Hayes (right end), Curry (quarterback), Friel (left halfback), Zerfoss (right halfback), and Wiggs (fullback).

=== Cumberland ===
Cumberland at Vanderbilt

Team	1	2	3	4	Total
Cumberland	0	0	0	0	0
• Vanderbilt	28	20	12	0	60

- Date: October 13
- Location: Dudley Field
  Nashville, Tennessee
- Referee: Hord Boensch

With four players out due to injury, the Commodores still managed to defeat the Cumberland Bulldogs 60–0 in a drizzling rain. Ray again scored four touchdowns. Alf Adams stood out on defense. The starting lineup was Chester (left end), Cody (left tackle), Williams (left guard), Reyer (center), Hamilton (right guard), Lipscomb (right tackle), Richardson (right end), Roach (quarterback), Floyd (left halfback), Ray (right halfback), and Wiggs (fullback).

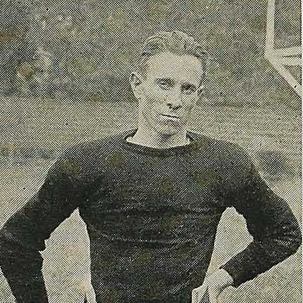
Rabbit Curry piloted the "point-a-minute" Commodores.

=== Henderson-Brown ===
Henderson-Brown at Vanderbilt

Team	1	2	3	4	Total
Henderson-Br.	0	0	0	0	0
• Vanderbilt	26	27	28	19	100

- Date: October 16
- Location: Dudley Field
  Nashville, Tennessee
- Referee: Bradley Walker

The Commodores beat Henderson-Brown 100–0. The "Rabbit" Curry ran for a 40-yard touchdown with the game barely a minute old, and later had a 40-yard punt return for a touchdown. "Sarah" Turner had an 80-yard run, and a 60-yard end run for a score in the third quarter. Tommy Ridley ran 60 yards on a fake punt. Catching Henderson-Brown exhausted, John Jarrett returned a kickoff 85 yards for a touchdown in the fourth quarter. The starting lineup was Y. Chester (left end), Cody (left tackle), Hamilton (left guard), Reyer (center), Williams (right guard), Lipscomb (right tackle), Cohen (right end), Curry (quarterback), Floyd (left halfback), Ray (right halfback), and Wiggs (fullback).

=== Ole Miss ===
Against Mississippi, the team traveled by train from Nashville to Memphis, Tennessee, where the game was to be played. The train was halted near Dickson by a wreck ahead of it, and the players complained about the lack of food on the train. The team's manager James Stahlman foraged through neighboring orchards near the tracks and picked three or four hatfuls of green apples. Curry ate several of them, and proceeded to score six touchdowns and kick eight extra points against Ole Miss. The final score was 91–0. The starting lineup was Hayes (left end), Cody (left tackle), Williams (left guard), Reyer (center), Putnam (right guard), Lipscomb (right tackle), Cohen (right end), Curry (quarterback), Floyd (left halfback), Zerfoss (right halfback), and Wiggs (fullback).

=== Tennessee ===
Tennessee at Vanderbilt

Team	1	2	3	4	Total
Tennessee	0	0	0	0	0
• Vanderbilt	7	0	7	21	35

- Date: October 30
- Location: Dudley Field
  Nashville, Tennessee
- Game start: 2:45 p. m.

The Tennessee Volunteers were the first real test for the Commodores, coming to Nashville as the Southern Intercollegiate Athletic Association (SIAA) defending champions and loaded with confidence. They were swamped, 35–0 as Curry and Turner ran for several yards. Curry once got away for 50 yards, the only touchdown of the first half. In the third quarter, Johnny Floyd ripped off 47 yards and Hubert Wiggs took it over.

Then Turner entered the game and his first run was 35 yards to the 6-yard line, where Wiggs again scored. The next time he ran 60 yards himself for the touchdown, and the last score came on a 20-yard dash by Cutter Northcutt, Curry's substitute. The victory was overshadowed by a most unfortunate spine injury to Bennett Jared, who died a few months later. The starting lineup was Adams (left end), Cody (left tackle), Williams (left guard), Reyer (center), Putnam (right guard), Lipscomb (right tackle), Cohen (right end), Curry (quarterback), Floyd (left halfback), Zerfoss (right halfback), and Wiggs (fullback).

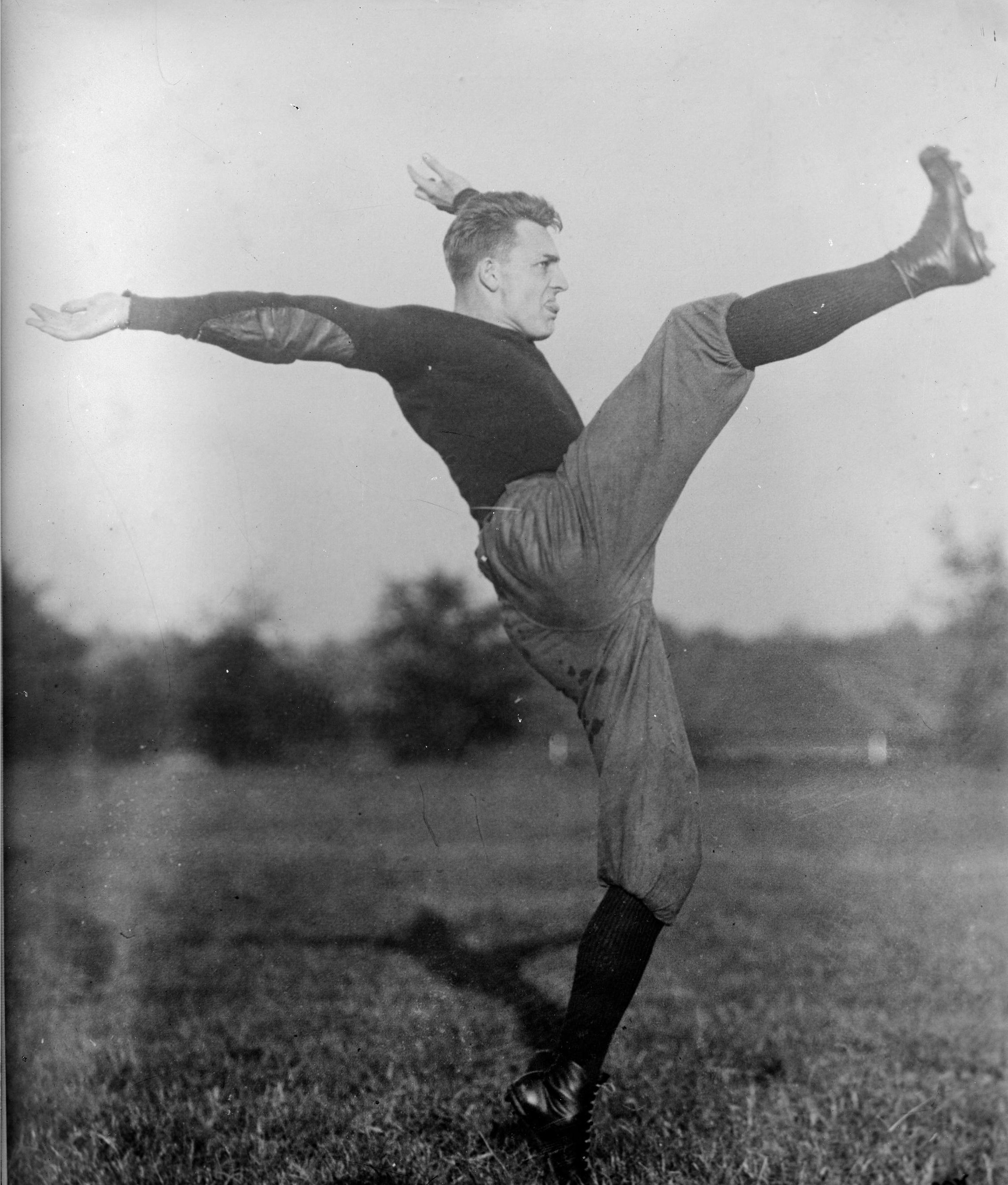
Virginia's Buck Mayer (pictured) was the South's first consensus All-American.

=== Virginia ===
Vanderbilt at Virginia

Team	1	2	3	4	Total
Vanderbilt	3	0	7	0	10
• Virginia	0	28	7	0	35

- Date: November 6
- Location: Charlottesville, Virginia
- Referee: Barry (Georgetown)

The Commodores ended the Tennessee game with a 7–0 record, having racked up 459 points with no points scored against them. A road game at Charlottesville, Virginia to face the University of Virginia was next on the schedule. The high-flying Commodores were overwhelmed, 10–35 by the Orange and Blue. Virginia gained 495 yards to Vanderbilt's 198. Buck Mayer, the South's first consensus All-American, starred for Virginia.

Zerfoss entered the game with an injury. Curry ran for 80 yards to score a touchdown on a fumbled punt. Cody booted a 20-yard field goal for the only other Commodores' score. Vanderbilt could only manage five first downs in the contest. The starting lineup was Adams (left end), Lipscomb (left tackle), Putnam (left guard), Reyer (center), Williams (right guard), Cody (right tackle), Cohen (right end), Curry (quarterback), Floyd (left halfback), Zerfoss (right halfback), and Wiggs (fullback).

=== Auburn ===
Vanderbilt at Auburn

Team	1	2	3	4	Total
• Vanderbilt	0	7	7	3	17
Auburn	0	0	0	0	0

- Date: November 13
- Location: Rickwood Field
  Birmingham, Alabama
- Referee: Bradley Walker

Next was the Auburn game, which McGugin had been pointing to since before the season began, as Auburn had dominated Southern football for the past two seasons, without a single team crossing its line. The game was played in Birmingham at Rickwood Field. (Note: Birmingham's Rickwood Field (built in 1910) still exists today and has been certified as the oldest ballpark in America. It was home to the Birmingham Red Barons of the old Southern Association for decades until 1987.)

Vanderbilt jumped out to a 17–0 lead on a rain-soaked field. A Curry pass to captain Cohen opened the scoring. Josh Cody took over himself from that point. In one of the greatest exhibitions of punt covering, Cody smothered the receiver every time, recovering two fumbles, one across the goal line for a touchdown. Then, in the last ten seconds of play, Cody drop kicked a three-pointer from the 33-yard line. Tom Zerfoss and Friel punted well. Curry's leadership was superb, and late in the game the Vanderbilt line rose as one to throw back three Auburn charges on the five-yard line. The starting lineup was Hayes (left end), Cody (left tackle), Williams (left guard), Reyer (center), Hamilton (right guard), Lipscomb (right tackle), Cohen (right end), Curry (quarterback), Floyd (left halfback), Zerfoss (right halfback), and Wiggs (fullback).

=== Sewanee ===
The final game of the season for the 8–1 Commodores was on Thanksgiving Day in Nashville against their rival Sewanee. The SIAA championship was at stake. A shutout over the "Men From the Mountain" would complete the SIAA schedule of being unscored upon. Thoroughly outplayed the first two quarters as Captain Bob Dobbins and Hek Clark led the Tiger attack, intermission found the Commodores behind 3–0, the result of "Red" Herring's field goal from the 20-yard line.

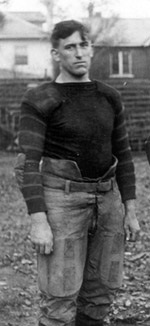
Josh Cody was selected third-team All-American.

Dan McGugin took the team over by Engineering Hall for a little talk. The Commodores came back playing hard, but at the start of the fourth quarter the score was still 3–0. Finally a sustained drive got underway that ended with "Dough" Ray plunging in for a touchdown from the four-yard line. Then Tom Lipscomb and Cody blocked a punt and Pud Reyer recovered on the five-yard line. Again Ray scored. Later Zerfoss skirted end for 26 yards, and Curry followed with a 34-yard dash and a third touchdown.

Curry was hurt, with three broken ribs, from the terrible pounding by Sewanee, but he still managed the top run of the day, 80 yards for a touchdown with Cody clearing his path. The final count was 28–3, and another SIAA championship. Sewanee coach Harris Cope said: "I think Curry is one of the greatest players I have ever seen." The starting lineup was Hayes (left end), Cody (left tackle), Williams (left guard), Reyer (center), Hamilton (right guard), Lipscomb (right tackle), Cohen (right end), Curry (quarterback), Floyd (left halfback), Zerfoss (right halfback), and Wiggs (fullback).

== After the season ==
The 1915 Vanderbilt football team scored a grand total of 514 points in 510 minutes of actual playing time, thus ranking them as a legitimate "point-a-minute" team. Vanderbilt averaged 51.4 points a game. Vanderbilt led the nation in scoring, then one of few stats kept.

During the season Curry accounted for 118 of Vanderbilt's season total of 514 points. Seven out of eight newspapers voted the SIAA championship to the Commodores. The Atlanta Constitution declared it a tie between Vanderbilt and Georgia Tech. Curry (unanimously), Cohen and Cody were named All-Southern.

In 1975, the team's manager, James G. Stahlman, organized a 60th reunion the weekend of the Georgia game. Seven lettermen were present: Cohen, Dough Ray, Hubert Wiggs, Kent Morrison, Alf Adams, and Tom Zerfoss.

== Players ==
=== Varsity letterwinners ===
==== Line ====
Player	Position	Games started	Hometown	Prep school	Height	Weight	Age
Alfred T. Adams	end	2	Nashville, Tennessee			175	17
Yunk Chester	end	2					
Josh Cody	tackle	9	Franklin, Tennessee	Battle Ground Academy	6'4"	212	23
Russ Cohen	end	7	Augusta, Georgia			168	22
C. M. Hamilton	guard	5					
Frank Hayes	end	4					
Tom Lipscomb	tackle	8			6'0"	205	
George "Pud" Reyer	center	8					
Pryor Williams	guard	7	Athens, Alabama		6'1"	210	21

==== Backfield ====
Player	Position	Games started	Hometown	Prep school	Height	Weight	Age
Irby Curry	quarterback	8	Marlin, Texas	Marlin High		128	21
Johnny Floyd	halfback	7	Murfreesboro, Tennessee	Middle Tennessee State Normal			24
Kent Morrison	halfback	0	McKenzie, Tennessee	McTyeire School			
Henry "Dough" Ray	halfback	2					
Bob "Sarah" Turner	halfback	0					
Hubert Wiggs	fullback	9	Tullahoma, Tennessee				22
Tom Zerfoss	halfback	7	Ashland, Kentucky	University of Kentucky		155	20

=== Depth chart ===
The following chart provides a visual depiction of Vanderbilt's lineup during the 1915 season with games started at the position reflected in parentheses. The chart mimics a short punt formation while on offense, with the quarterback under center.

LE
Frank Hayes (3)
Yunk Chester (2)
Alf Adams (2)
Richardson (1)
Williams (1)

LT	LG	C	RG	RT
Josh Cody (8)	Pryor Williams (5)	Pud Reyer (8)	C. M. Hamilton (3)	Tom Lipscomb (7)
Tom Lipscomb (1)	C. M. Hamilton (2)	Pryor Williams (1)	Putnam (3)	Josh Cody (1)
	Putnam (1)		Pryor Williams (2)	Putnam (1)
	Pud Reyer (1)		Tom Lipscomb (1)	
	C. Brown (0)			

RE
Russ Cohen (7)
Frank Hayes (1)
Richardson (1)

QB
Irby Curry (8)
Roach (1)
Cutter Northcutt (0)

LHB	RHB
Johnny Floyd (7)	Tom Zerfoss (6)
Tom Zerfoss (1)	Dough Ray (2)
Friel (1)	Hubert Wiggs (1)
Sarah Turner (0)	K. Morrison (0)

FB
Hubert Wiggs (8)
King (1)
Bennett Jared (0)

-

== Bibliography ==
- Traughber, Bill (2011). Vanderbilt Football: Tales of Commodore Gridiron History. The History Press. ISBN 978-1-60949-423-0.
