= 1915 LSU Tigers football team =

American college football season

1915 LSU Tigers football
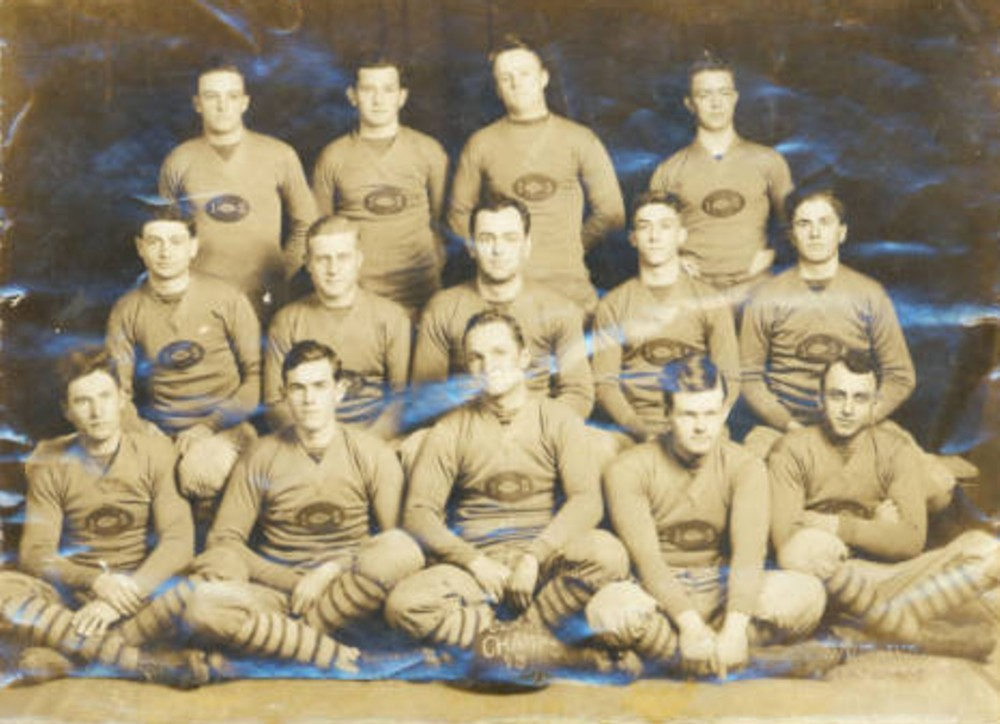
- Conference: Southern Intercollegiate Athletic Association
- Record: 6–2 (4–0 SIAA)
- Head coach: E. T. McDonald (2nd season)
- Captain: Alf Reid
- Home stadium: State Field

1915 Southern Intercollegiate Athletic Association football standings
	Conf.					Overall
Team	W		L		T	W		L		T
Vanderbilt $	5	–	0	–	0	9	–	1	–	0
Alabama	5	–	0	–	0	6	–	2	–	0
LSU	4	–	0	–	0	6	–	2	–	0
Transylvania	3	–	0	–	1	7	–	1	–	1
Auburn	5	–	1	–	0	6	–	2	–	0
Georgia	3	–	1	–	1	5	–	2	–	2
Chattanooga	3	–	1	–	2	5	–	2	–	2
Mississippi A&M	4	–	2	–	1	5	–	2	–	1
Kentucky	2	–	1	–	1	6	–	1	–	1
Florida	3	–	3	–	0	4	–	3	–	0
Clemson	2	–	2	–	1	2	–	4	–	2
South Carolina	1	–	1	–	1	5	–	3	–	1
Furman	1	–	1	–	0	5	–	3	–	0
Mercer	2	–	3	–	0	5	–	4	–	0
Mississippi College	2	–	3	–	0	4	–	4	–	1
The Citadel	1	–	2	–	0	5	–	3	–	0
Sewanee	1	–	2	–	2	4	–	3	–	2
Tennessee	1	–	4	–	0	4	–	4	–	0
Tulane	1	–	4	–	0	4	–	4	–	0
Central University	0	–	3	–	1	3	–	5	–	1
Louisville	0	–	3	–	1	1	–	5	–	1
Howard (AL)	0	–	3	–	0	3	–	4	–	1
Wofford	0	–	3	–	0	3	–	5	–	0
Ole Miss	0	–	5	–	0	2	–	6	–	0
$ – Conference champion

The 1915 LSU Tigers football team represented the University of Louisiana (now known as Louisiana State University or LSU) as a member of the Southern Intercollegiate Athletic Association (SIAA) during the 1915 college football season. Led by second-year head coach E. T. McDonald, the Tigers compiled an overall record of 6–2, with a mark of 4–0 in conference play, and finished third in the SIAA. LSU played home games at State Field in Baton Rouge, Louisiana.

== Schedule ==
Date	Opponent	Site	Result	Attendance	Source
October 1	Jefferson (MS)*	State Field; Baton Rouge, LA	W 42–0		
October 9	Mississippi College	State Field; Baton Rouge, LA	W 14–0		
October 15	at Ole Miss	Hemingway Stadium; Oxford, MS (rivalry)	W 28–0	600	
October 22	vs. Georgia Tech*	Heinemann Park; New Orleans, LA	L 7–36	3,000	
October 30	Mississippi A&M	State Field; Baton Rouge, LA (rivalry)	W 10–0		
November 6	vs. Arkansas*	Fair Grounds; Shreveport, LA (rivalry)	W 13–7		
November 17	at Rice*	West End Park; Houston, TX	L 0–6		
November 25	Tulane	State Field; Baton Rouge, LA (rivalry)	W 12–0		
*Non-conference game
