= 1915 Howard Baptists football team =

American college football season

1915 Howard Baptists football
- Conference: Southern Intercollegiate Athletic Association
- Record: 3–4–1 (0–3 SIAA)
- Head coach: Eugene Caton (1st season)
- Home stadium: Howard Athletic Field; Rickwood Field

1915 Southern Intercollegiate Athletic Association football standings
	Conf.					Overall
Team	W		L		T	W		L		T
Vanderbilt $	5	–	0	–	0	9	–	1	–	0
Alabama	5	–	0	–	0	6	–	2	–	0
LSU	4	–	0	–	0	6	–	2	–	0
Transylvania	3	–	0	–	1	7	–	1	–	1
Auburn	5	–	1	–	0	6	–	2	–	0
Georgia	3	–	1	–	1	5	–	2	–	2
Chattanooga	3	–	1	–	2	5	–	2	–	2
Mississippi A&M	4	–	2	–	1	5	–	2	–	1
Kentucky	2	–	1	–	1	6	–	1	–	1
Florida	3	–	3	–	0	4	–	3	–	0
Clemson	2	–	2	–	1	2	–	4	–	2
South Carolina	1	–	1	–	1	5	–	3	–	1
Furman	1	–	1	–	0	5	–	3	–	0
Mercer	2	–	3	–	0	5	–	4	–	0
Mississippi College	2	–	3	–	0	4	–	4	–	1
The Citadel	1	–	2	–	0	5	–	3	–	0
Sewanee	1	–	2	–	2	4	–	3	–	2
Tennessee	1	–	4	–	0	4	–	4	–	0
Tulane	1	–	4	–	0	4	–	4	–	0
Central University	0	–	3	–	1	3	–	5	–	1
Louisville	0	–	3	–	1	1	–	5	–	1
Howard (AL)	0	–	3	–	0	3	–	4	–	1
Wofford	0	–	3	–	0	3	–	5	–	0
Ole Miss	0	–	5	–	0	2	–	6	–	0
$ – Conference champion

The 1915 Howard Baptists football team was an American football team that represented Howard College (now known as the Samford University) as a member of the Southern Intercollegiate Athletic Association (SIAA) during the 1915 college football season. In their first year under head coach Eugene Caton, the team compiled a 3–4–1 record.

== Schedule ==
Date	Opponent	Site	Result	Source
October 2	at Alabama	University Field; Tuscaloosa, AL	L 0–44	
October 9	Alabama Presbyterian*	Howard Athletic Field; Birmingham, AL	W 7–0	
October 15	Southern (AL)*	Greensboro, AL	W 6–0	
October 22	Ninth District Agricultural School*	Howard Athletic Field; Birmingham, AL	W 20–0	
October 30	at Mercer	Central City Park; Macon, GA	L 7–14	
November 6	vs. Birmingham*	Rickwood Field; Birmingham, AL	T 6–6	
November 13	at Tulane	Tulane Stadium; New Orleans, LA	L 3–32	
November 25	at Spring Hill*	Maxon Park; Mobile, AL	L 0–6	
*Non-conference game
