= 1915 Southern Intercollegiate Athletic Association football season =

- League: NCAA
- Sport: College football
- Duration: September 25, 1915 through November 25, 1915
- Teams: 23

Regular Season
- Season champions: Vanderbilt

Football seasons
- 1914 1916

1915 Southern Intercollegiate Athletic Association football standings
	Conf.					Overall
Team	W		L		T	W		L		T
Vanderbilt $	5	–	0	–	0	9	–	1	–	0
Alabama	5	–	0	–	0	6	–	2	–	0
LSU	4	–	0	–	0	6	–	2	–	0
Transylvania	3	–	0	–	1	7	–	1	–	1
Auburn	5	–	1	–	0	6	–	2	–	0
Georgia	3	–	1	–	1	5	–	2	–	2
Chattanooga	3	–	1	–	2	5	–	2	–	2
Mississippi A&M	4	–	2	–	1	5	–	2	–	1
Kentucky	2	–	1	–	1	6	–	1	–	1
Florida	3	–	3	–	0	4	–	3	–	0
Clemson	2	–	2	–	1	2	–	4	–	2
South Carolina	1	–	1	–	1	5	–	3	–	1
Furman	1	–	1	–	0	5	–	3	–	0
Mercer	2	–	3	–	0	5	–	4	–	0
Mississippi College	2	–	3	–	0	4	–	4	–	1
The Citadel	1	–	2	–	0	5	–	3	–	0
Sewanee	1	–	2	–	2	4	–	3	–	2
Tennessee	1	–	4	–	0	4	–	4	–	0
Tulane	1	–	4	–	0	4	–	4	–	0
Central University	0	–	3	–	1	3	–	5	–	1
Louisville	0	–	3	–	1	1	–	5	–	1
Howard (AL)	0	–	3	–	0	3	–	4	–	1
Wofford	0	–	3	–	0	3	–	5	–	0
Ole Miss	0	–	5	–	0	2	–	6	–	0
$ – Conference champion

The 1915 Southern Intercollegiate Athletic Association football season was the college football games played by the member schools of the Southern Intercollegiate Athletic Association as part of the 1915 college football season. The season began on September 25.

Seven out of eight newspapers voted the SIAA championship to the Vanderbilt Commodores. The Atlanta Constitution declared it a tie between Vanderbilt and Georgia Tech, which was then independent. However, Tech challenged Vandy's championship.

== Regular season ==
Index to colors and formatting
Non-conference matchup; SIAA member won
Non-conference matchup; SIAA member lost
Non-conference matchup; tie
Conference matchup

SIAA teams in bold.

=== Week One ===
Date	Visiting team	Home team	Site	Result	Attendance	Reference
September 25	Charleston Navy	**The Citadel**	College Park Stadium • Charleston, SC	**W** 46–0		
September 25	**Clemson**	**Furman**	Augusta Street Park • Greenville, SC	**CLEM** 99–0		
September 25	Chamberlain-Hunt Academy	**Mississippi College**	Clinton, MS	**W** 28–0		
September 25	Carson–Newman	**Tennessee**	Waite Field • Knoxville, TN	**W** 101–0		
September 25	**Tulane**	St. Paul's School	St. Paul's Stadium • Covington, LA	**W** 24–0		
September 25	Middle Tennessee State Normal	**Vanderbilt**	Dudley Field • Nashville, TN	**W** 51–0		
September 25	Newberry	**Georgia**	Sanford Field • Athens, GA	**W** 76–0		
September 25	Kentucky School for the Deaf	**Central University**	Cheek Field • Danville, KY	**W** 6–0		
September 25	Gordon	**Mercer**	Central City Park • Macon, GA	**W** 6–0		
September 25	**Chattanooga**	Rhea County High School	Dayton, TN	**W** 21–0		
September 25	Ohio	**Transylvania**	Thomas Field • Lexington, KY	**W** 16–0		

=== Week Two ===
Date	Visiting team	Home team	Site	Result	Attendance	Reference
October 1	Kentucky Military Institute	**Transylvania**	Thomas Field • Lexington, KY	**W** 27–0		
October 1	Jonesboro Aggies	**Ole Miss**	Hemingway Stadium • Oxford, MS	**L** 0–10		
October 1	Marion	**Auburn**	Riverside Park • Selma, AL	**W** 78–0		
October 1	North Georgia	**Georgia**	Sanford Field • Athens, GA	**W** 13–0		
October 1	Jefferson (MS)	**LSU**	State Field • Baton Rouge, LA	**W** 42–0		
October 2	**Howard (AL)**	**Alabama**	University Field • Tuscaloosa, AL	**ALA** 44–0		
October 2	**Central University**	**Louisville**	Eclipse Park • Louisville, KY	**T** 0–0		
October 2	Davidson	**Clemson**	Riggs Field • Calhoun, SC	**T** 6–6		
October 2	Erskine	**Furman**	Augusta Street Park • Greenville, SC	**W** 60–0		
October 2	**Mercer**	Georgia Tech	Grant Field • Atlanta, GA	**L** 0–52		
October 2	Butler	**Kentucky**	Stoll Field • Lexington, KY	**W** 33–0		
October 2	**Mississippi College**	**Mississippi A&M**	State Fairgrounds • Jackson, MS	**MSA&M** 12–0		
October 2	Morgan Training School	**Sewanee**	Hardee Field • Sewanee, TN	**W** 57–0		
October 2	Tusculum	**Tennessee**	Waite Field • Knoxville, TN	**W** 21–0		
October 2	Newberry	**South Carolina**	Davis Field • Columbia, SC	**W** 29–0		
October 2	Southwestern Presbyterian	**Vanderbilt**	Dudley Field • Nashville, TN	**W** 47–0		
October 2	Presbyterian	**Wofford**	Spartanburg, SC	**L** 6–17		
October 2	**The Citadel**	North Carolina	Class Field • Chapel Hill, NC	**L** 7–14		
October 2	Carson–Newman	**Chattanooga**	Chamberlain Field • Chattanooga, TN	**W** 93–0		

=== Week Three ===
Date	Visiting team	Home team	Site	Result	Attendance	Reference
October 8	Southwestern Presbyterian	**Ole Miss**	Hemingway Stadium • Oxford, MS	**W** 13–6		
October 9	**Mississippi College**	**LSU**	State Field • Baton Rouge, LA	**LSU** 14–0		
October 9	Birmingham	**Alabama**	University Field • Tuscaloosa, AL	**W** 67–0		
October 9	**Florida**	**Auburn**	Drake Field • Auburn, AL	**AUB** 7–0		
October 9	Porter Military	**The Citadel**	College Park Stadium • Charleston, SC	**W** 54–0		
October 9	**Georgia**	**Chattanooga**	Chamberlain Field • Chattanooga, TN	**T** 6–6		
October 9	Earlham	**Kentucky**	Stoll Field • Lexington, KY	**W** 54–13		
October 9	**Louisville**	Wabash	Crawfordsville, IN	**L** 0–38		
October 9	Cumberland (TN)	**Sewanee**	Hardee Field • Sewanee, TN	**W** 47–0		
October 9	Presbyterian	**South Carolina**	Davis Field • Columbia, SC	**W** 41–0		
October 9	**Transylvania**	**Mississippi A&M**	New Athletic Field • Starkville, MS	**T** 0–0		
October 9	Southwestern Industrial	**Tulane**	Tulane Stadium • New Orleans, LA	**W** 13–0		
October 9	Georgetown (KY)	**Vanderbilt**	Dudley Field • Nashville, TN	**W** 75–0		
October 9	Kentucky Military Institute	**Central University**	Cheek Field • Lexington, KY	**W** 12–6		
October 9	Alabama Presbyterian	**Howard (AL)**	Howard Athletic Field • Birmingham, AL	**W** 7–0		

=== Week Four ===
Date	Visiting team	Home team	Site	Result	Attendance	Reference
October 11	**Wofford**	**Mercer**	Central City Park • Macon, GA	**MERC** 13–6		
October 12	**Transylvania**	Southwestern Presbyterian	Athletic Park • Nashville, TN	**W** 26–0		
October 13	Cumberland (TN)	**Vanderbilt**	Dudley Field • Nashville, TN	**W** 60–0		
October 15	**LSU**	**Ole Miss**	Hemingway Stadium • Oxford, MS	**LSU** 28–0	600	
October 15	Presbyterian	**Furman**	Augusta Street Park • Greenville, SC	**L** 12–20		
October 15	**Howard (AL)**	Southern (AL)	Greensboro, AL	**W** 6–0		
October 16	**Chattanooga**	**Louisville**	Eclipse Park • Louisville, KY	**CHAT** 21–6		
October 16	**Mississippi College**	**Alabama**	University Field • Tuscaloosa, AL	**ALA** 40–0		
October 16	**Auburn**	**Clemson**	Anderson, SC	**AUB** 14–0		
October 16	**Georgia**	**The Citadel**	College Park Stadium • Charleston, SC	**UGA** 39–0		
October 16	**Sewanee**	**Florida**	Barrs Field • Jacksonville, FL	**SEW** 7–0		
October 16	**Transylvania**	Georgia Tech	Grant Field • Atlanta, GA	**L** 0–57		
October 16	**Kentucky**	**Mississippi A&M**	New Athletic Field • Starkville, MS	**MSA&M** 12–0		
October 16	**Central University**	**Tennessee**	Waite Field • Knoxville, TN	**TENN** 80–0		
October 16	Spring Hill	**Tulane**	Tulane Stadium • New Orleans, LA	**W** 36–13		
October 16	Henderson-Brown	**Vanderbilt**	Dudley Field • Nashville, TN	**W** 100–0		
October 16	**Wofford**	Davidson	Sprunt Athletic Field • Davidson, NC	**L** 0–45		

=== Week Five ===
Date	Visiting team	Home team	Site	Result	Attendance	Reference
October 21	**South Carolina**	North Carolina A&M	Riddick Stadium • Raleigh, NC	**W** 19–10		
October 22	Marshall	**Central University**	Cheek Field • Danville, KY	**W** 10–6		
October 22	Georgia Tech	**LSU**	Heinemann Park • New Orleans, LA	**L** 7–36	3,000	
October 22	Ninth District Agricultural School	**Howard (AL)**	Howard Athletic Field • Birmingham, AL	**W** 20–0		
October 23	**Tulane**	**Alabama**	University Field • Tuscaloosa, AL	**ALA** 16–0		
October 23	**Mississippi A&M**	**Auburn**	Rickwood Field • Birmingham, AL	**AUB** 26–0		
October 23	**Furman**	Bingham Military Institute	Oates Park • Asheville, NC	**W** 20–6		
October 23	Mississippi Normal	**Mississippi College**	Clinton, MS	**W** 55–7		
October 23	**Kentucky**	**Sewanee**	Stoll Field • Lexington, KY	**T** 7–7	5,000	
October 23	Cumberland (TN)	**Tennessee**	Waite Field • Knoxville, TN	**W** 101–0		
October 23	**Ole Miss**	**Vanderbilt**	Russwood Park • Memphis, TN	**VAN** 91–0		
October 23	Erskine	**Wofford**	Spartanburg, SC	**W** 13–3		
October 23	**Mercer**	**Chattanooga**	Chamberlain Field • Chattanooga, TN	**CHAT** 20–6		

=== Week Six ===
Date	Visiting team	Home team	Site	Result	Attendance	Reference
October 27	Presbyterian	**The Citadel**	State Fairgrounds • Columbia, SC	**W** 14–0		
October 27	**Wofford**	Newberry	Newberry Diamond • Newberry, SC	**W** 10–7		
October 28	**Clemson**	**South Carolina**	State Fairgrounds • Columbia, SC	**T** 0–0		
October 29	Hendrix	**Ole Miss**	Hemingway Stadium • Oxford, MS	**W** 32–7		
October 29	**Central University**	Kentucky Wesleyan	Owensboro, KY	**L** 6–7		
October 30	**Sewanee**	**Alabama**	Rickwood Field • Birmingham, AL	**ALA** 23–10		
October 30	**Auburn**	**Georgia**	Sanford Field • Athens, GA	**AUB** 12–0		
October 30	Southern College	**Florida**	Fleming Field • Gainesville, FL	**W** 45–0		
October 30	Cincinnati	**Kentucky**	Stoll Field • Lexington, KY	**W** 27–6		
October 30	**Mississippi A&M**	**LSU**	State Field • Baton Rouge, LA	**LSU** 10–0		
October 30	**Mississippi College**	**Tulane**	Tulane Stadium • New Orleans, LA	**MSCOLL** 20–6		
October 30	Rose Poly	**Louisville**	Eclipse Park • Louisville, KY	**W** 22–6		
October 30	**Tennessee**	**Vanderbilt**	Dudley Field • Nashville, TN	**VAN** 35–0		
October 30	**Chattanooga**	Maryville (TN)	Maryville, TN	**L** 0–13		
October 30	**Howard (AL)**	**Mercer**	Central City Park • Macon, GA	**MER** 14–7		

=== Week Seven ===
Date	Visiting team	Home team	Site	Result	Attendance	Reference
November 3	Presbyterian	**Furman**	Augusta Street Park • Greenville, SC	**W** 38–7		
November 4	**South Carolina**	**Wofford**	Spartanburg Fairgrounds • Spartanburg, SC	**SC** 33–6		
November 5	Georgetown (KY)	**Central University**	Cheek Field • Danville, KY	**L** 3–19		
November 6	Arkansas	**LSU**	Fairgrounds • Shreveport, LA	**W** 13–7		
November 6	**Mercer**	**Auburn**	Drake Field • Auburn, AL	**AUB** 45–0		
November 6	**Transylvania**	**Chattanooga**	Chamberlain Field • Chattanooga, TN	**TRAN** 17–0		
November 6	**Georgia**	**Florida**	Barrs Field • Jacksonville, FL	**UGA** 37–0		
November 6	**Alabama**	Georgia Tech	Grant Field • Atlanta, GA	**L** 7–21		
November 6	**Kentucky**	**Louisville**	Eclipse Park • Louisville, KY	**UK** 15–0	4,000	
November 6	**Ole Miss**	**Mississippi A&M**	Fair Grounds • Tupelo, MS	**MSA&M** 65–0		
November 5	Cumberland (TN)	**South Carolina**	Davis Field • Columbia, SC	**W** 68–0		
November 6	North Carolina	**Clemson**	Greenville, SC	**L** 7–9		
November 6	**Sewanee**	Texas	West End Park • Houston, TX	**L** 6–27		
November 6	**Vanderbilt**	Virginia	Lambeth Field • Charlottesville, VA	**L** 10–35		
November 6	Birmingham	**Howard (AL)**	Rickwood Field • Birmingham, AL	**T** 6–6		
November 8	**Sewanee**	Baylor	Cotton Palace • Waco, TX	**W** 16–3		

=== Week Eight ===
Date	Visiting team	Home team	Site	Result	Attendance	Reference
November 10	Cumberland (TN)	**Wofford**	Spartanburg, SC	**W** 2–0		
November 12	**Mercer**	South Georgia College	Coffee County Fairgrounds • Douglas, GA	**W** 20–0		
November 12	**Central University**	**Transylvania**	Thomas Field • Lexington, KY	**TRAN** 38–0		
November 13	**Vanderbilt**	**Auburn**	Rickwood Field • Birmingham, AL	**VAN** 17–0		
November 13	**Clemson**	VMI	Broad Street Park • Richmond, VA	**L** 3–6		
November 13	**The Citadel**	**Florida**	Fleming Field • Gainesville, FL	**FLA** 6–0		
November 13	Newberry	**Furman**	Augusta Street Park • Greenville, SC	**W** 7–0		
November 13	**Georgia**	Georgia Tech	Grant Field • Atlanta, GA	**T** 0–0		
November 13	Purdue	**Kentucky**	Stoll Field • Lexington, KY	**W** 7–0		
November 13	Virginia	**South Carolina**	Davis Field • Columbia, SC	**L** 0–13		
November 13	**Ole Miss**	**Mississippi College**	State Fairgrounds • Jackson, MS	**MSCOLL** 74–6		
November 13	**Mississippi A&M**	**Tennessee**	Waite Field • Knoxville, TN	**MSA&M** 14–0		
November 13	**Sewanee**	**Chattanooga**	Andrews Field • Chattanooga, TN	**T** 0–0		
November 13	**Howard (AL)**	**Tulane**	Tulane Stadium • New Orleans, LA	**TUL** 32–3		
November 13	Franklin (IN)	**Louisville**	Eclipse Park • Louisville, KY	**L** 7–13		
November 13	**Mercer**	Columbia College (FL)	Valdosta, GA	**W** 32–0		

=== Week Nine ===
Date	Visiting team	Home team	Site	Result	Attendance	Reference
November 17	LSU	Rice	West End Park • Houston, TX	**L** 0–6		
November 18	Tulane	**Florida**	Fleming Field • Gainesville, FL	**FLA** 14–7		
November 17	South Carolina	Georgetown	Georgetown Field • Washington, DC	**L** 0–61		
November 19	Transylvania	Georgetown (KY)	Hinton Field • Georgetown, KY	**W** 14–6		
November 20	Mississippi College	Louisiana Industrial	Ruston, LA	**T** 0–0		
November 20	Sewanee	**Vanderbilt**	Dudley Field • Nashville, TN	**VAN** 27–3		

=== Week Ten ===
Date	Visiting team	Home team	Site	Result	Attendance	Reference
November 25	Ole Miss	**Alabama**	Rickwood Field • Birmingham, AL	**ALA** 53–0		
November 25	The Citadel	**South Carolina**	Davis Field • Columbia, SC	**CIT** 3–0		
November 25	Central University	**Chattanooga**	Chamberlain Field • Chattanooga, TN	**CHAT** 33–0		
November 25	Florida	**Mercer**	Central City Park • Macon, GA	**FLA** 34–7		
November 25	Wofford	**Furman**	Augusta Street Park • Greenville, SC	**FUR** 25–0	1,000	
November 25	Auburn	Georgia Tech	Grant Field • Atlanta, GA	**L** 0–7		
November 25	Clemson	**Georgia**	Sanford Field • Athens, GA	**UGA** 13–0		
November 25	Tennessee	**Kentucky**	Stoll Field • Lexington, KY	**UK** 6–0		
November 25	Mississippi A&M	Texas A&M	Kyle Field • College Station, TX	**W** 7–0		
November 25	Tulane	**LSU**	State Field • Baton Rouge, LA	**LSU** 12–0		
November 25	Transylvania	**Louisville**	Eclipse Park • Louisville, KY	**TRAN** 26–0		
November 25	Howard (AL)	Spring Hill	Maxon Park • Mobile, AL	**L** 0–6		

== Awards and honors ==
=== All-Americans ===
- T - Bully Van de Graaff, Alabama (WC-2; PD-1)
- T - Josh Cody, Vanderbilt (WC-3)
- G - Baby Taylor, Auburn (WC-3)

=== All-Southern team ===
The composite All-Southern team selected by ten sports writers and coaches included:

Position	Name	First-team selectors	Team
QB	Irby Curry	C, TC	Vanderbilt
QB	David Paddock	C, TC	Georgia
HB	Wooch Fielder	C, TC	Georgia Tech
FB	Walter Neville	C	Georgia
E	Charlie Thompson	C	Georgia
T	Bully Van de Graaff	C, TC	Alabama
G	Baby Taylor	C, TC	Auburn
C	John G. Henderson	C, TC	Georgia
G	Bob Lang	C	Georgia Tech
T	Josh Cody	C, TC	Vanderbilt
E	Russ Cohen	C	Vanderbilt
