= 1915 Florida Gators football team =

American college football season

1915 Florida Gators football
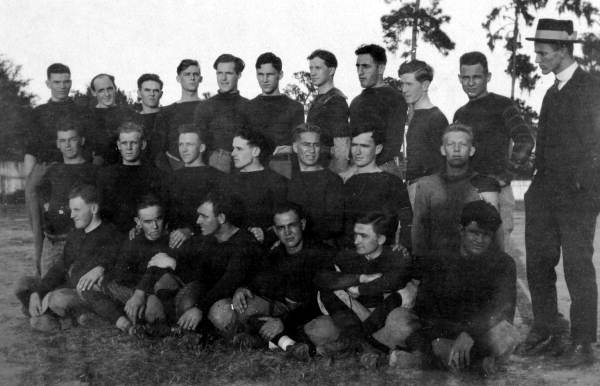
- Florida Gators c. 1915
- Conference: Southern Intercollegiate Athletic Association
- Record: 4–3 (3–3 SIAA)
- Head coach: C. J. McCoy (2nd season)
- Captain: A. A. "Daddy" Lotspeich
- Home stadium: Fleming Field

1915 Southern Intercollegiate Athletic Association football standings
	Conf.					Overall
Team	W		L		T	W		L		T
Vanderbilt $	5	–	0	–	0	9	–	1	–	0
Alabama	5	–	0	–	0	6	–	2	–	0
LSU	4	–	0	–	0	6	–	2	–	0
Transylvania	3	–	0	–	1	7	–	1	–	1
Auburn	5	–	1	–	0	6	–	2	–	0
Georgia	3	–	1	–	1	5	–	2	–	2
Chattanooga	3	–	1	–	2	5	–	2	–	2
Mississippi A&M	4	–	2	–	1	5	–	2	–	1
Kentucky	2	–	1	–	1	6	–	1	–	1
Florida	3	–	3	–	0	4	–	3	–	0
Clemson	2	–	2	–	1	2	–	4	–	2
South Carolina	1	–	1	–	1	5	–	3	–	1
Furman	1	–	1	–	0	5	–	3	–	0
Mercer	2	–	3	–	0	5	–	4	–	0
Mississippi College	2	–	3	–	0	4	–	4	–	1
The Citadel	1	–	2	–	0	5	–	3	–	0
Sewanee	1	–	2	–	2	4	–	3	–	2
Tennessee	1	–	4	–	0	4	–	4	–	0
Tulane	1	–	4	–	0	4	–	4	–	0
Central University	0	–	3	–	1	3	–	5	–	1
Louisville	0	–	3	–	1	1	–	5	–	1
Howard (AL)	0	–	3	–	0	3	–	4	–	1
Wofford	0	–	3	–	0	3	–	5	–	0
Ole Miss	0	–	5	–	0	2	–	6	–	0
$ – Conference champion

The 1915 Florida Gators football team represented the University of Florida during the 1915 Southern Intercollegiate Athletic Association football season. The season was C. J. McCoy's second as the head coach of the Florida Gators football team. McCoy's 1915 Florida Gators completed their tenth varsity football season with an overall record of 4–3 and their sixth year in the Southern Intercollegiate Athletic Association (SIAA) with a conference record of 3–3.

== Before the season ==
Last year, first-year head coach Charles J. McCoy had churned out a Florida team in the top half of the SIAA. McCoy this year was also the school's first basketball coach.

The team's captain was tackle A. A. "Daddy" Lotspeich. At the guards were Ham Dowling, future Georgia Tech transfer, and Everett Yon, future Gator athletic director. Leading the backfield was Rammy Ramsdell, "the Gators' first quarterback of note," and first scholarship athlete at the University of Florida.

Assisting the team was Z. J. Stanley, the head coach of the Maryville Scots the previous year.

== Schedule ==
Date	Time	Opponent	Site	Result	Source
October 9		at Auburn	Drake Field; Auburn, AL (rivalry)	L 0–7	
October 16	3:25 p.m.	vs. Sewanee	Barrs Field; Jacksonville, FL	L 0–7	
October 30		Southern College*	Fleming Field; Gainesville, FL	W 45–0	
November 6		vs. Georgia	Barrs Field; Jacksonville, FL (rivalry)	L 0–37	
November 13		The Citadel	Fleming Field; Gainesville, FL	W 6–0	
November 18		Tulane	Fleming Field; Gainesville, FL	W 14–7	
November 25		at Mercer	Central City Park; Macon, GA	W 34–7	
*Non-conference game

== Game summaries ==
=== Auburn ===
Florida at Auburn

Team	1	2	3	4	Total
Florida	0	0	0	0	0
• Auburn	0	0	0	7	7

- Date: October 9
- Location: Drake Field
  Auburn, AL
- Referee: John Counselman

The season opened with a 7–0 loss to Auburn. Florida played hard for three quarters, until Wren scored the winning touchdown in the final period.

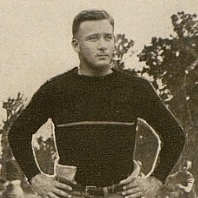
Ham Dowling

The starting lineup was Henderson (left end), Lotspiech (left tackle), Callen (left guard), Farrin (center), Yon (right guard), Goldsby (right tackle), Roble (right end), Ramsdell (quarterback), Thompson (left halfback), Fuller (right halfback), Sparkman (fullback).

=== Sewanee ===
Sewanee at Florida

Team	1	2	3	4	Total
• Sewanee	0	7	0	0	7
Florida	0	0	0	0	0

- Date: October 16
- Location: Barrs Field
  Jacksonville, FL
- Game start: 3:25 p. m.
- Game weather: Hot

Florida lost to coach Harris Cope's Sewanee Tigers 7–0, continuing the losing streak against the Tigers. The Sewanee game was then the largest crowd to see a game in Jacksonville.

"After scoring one touchdown Sewanee was content to allow Florida to exhaust herself in vain attempts to find the weak spot in the Purple defense." Sewanee's Ellerbe scored the game's only touchdown.

The starting lineup was Henderson (left end), Lotspeich (left tackle), Dowling (left guard), Farrior (center), Yon (right guard), Goldsby (right tackle), Robles (right end), Ramsdell (quarterback), Sparkman (left halfback), Thompson (right halfback), Fuller (fullback).

=== Southern College ===
The Gators lengthened their winning streak against Southern College with an easy 45–0 victory.

=== Georgia ===
Georgia at Florida

Team	1	2	3	4	Total
• Georgia	0	13	17	7	37
Florida	0	0	0	0	0

- Date: November 6
- Location: Barrs Field
  Jacksonville, FL
- Referee: Rip Major

The Gators lost their first-ever game against coach Alex Cunningham's Georgia Bulldogs 0–37 in Jacksonville, at a larger crowder than at the Sewanee game. The Gators carried the ball to Georgia's 15-yard line in the first period, but never threatened afterwards. Georgia put across two touchdowns in the second quarter, and had a strong second half.

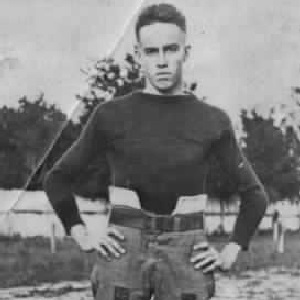
Rammy Ramsdell

The starting lineup was Henderson (left end), Lotspeich (left tackle), Dowling (left guard), Farrior (center), Robles (right guard), Goldsby (right tackle), Lovell (right end), Ramsdell (quarterback), Sparkman (left halfback), Thompson (right halfback), Fuller (fullback).

=== The Citadel ===
The Citadel at Florida

Team	1	2	3	4	Total
The Citadel	0	0	0	0	0
• Florida	0	0	6	0	6

- Date: November 13
- Location: Gainesville, FL

Florida beat The Citadel 6–0 in a game "marked by frequent fumbling." Florida scored when, in the third quarter, Sparkman rushed for an 8-yard touchdown.

=== Tulane ===
In a torrential rain, Florida met Tulane for the first time and upset the Olive and Blue 14–7, the highlight of the season. Rammy Ramsdell scored the game-winning touchdown, "crashing through center" and zig-zagging 60 yards to the endzone.

The starting lineup was Henderson (left end), Lotspeich (left tackle), Yon (left guard), Farrior (center), Robles (right guard), Goldsby (right tackle), Wilkinson (right end), Ramsdell (quarterback), Sparkman (left halfback), Thompson (right halfback), Fuller (fullback).

=== Mercer ===
Florida at Mercer

Team	1	2	3	4	Total
• Florida	13	7	7	7	34
Mercer	0	0	7	0	7

- Date: November 25
- Location: Macon, Georgia
- Referee: Smith (Cornell)

The Gators defeated the Mercer Baptists 34–7. Rammy Ramsdell had a then-school record of four touchdowns.

According to one account, Ramsdell in fact scored three touchdowns but set up all five. The first was a Sparkman touchdown set up by a 25-yard end run from Ramsdell, the second was a 5-yard run by Fuller set up by a 40-yard pass from Ramsdell to Henderson.

The starting lineup was Henderson (left end), Lotspeich (left tackle), Robles (left guard), Farrior (center), Yon (right guard), Goldsby (right tackle), Wilkinson (right end), Ramsdell (quarterback), Thomson (left halfback), Sparkman (right halfback), Fuller (fullback).

== Personnel ==
=== Line ===
Player	Position	Games started	High school	Height	Weight	Age
Ham Dowling	Guard		Duval	5'9"	185	20
Rex Farrior	Center		Hillsborough	5'8"	170	19
Jack Goldsby	Tackle			5'9"	185	20
B. Henderson	End			5'8"	150	20
Daddy Lotspeich	Tackle			5'10"	175	23
Liza Robles	Tackle			5'11"	180	21
Bill Wilkinson	End			5'8"	145	22
Everett Yon	Guard			5'11"	175	20

=== Backfield ===
Player	Position	Games started	High school	Height	Weight	Age
Bush Bushnell	Halfback			5'8"	150	21
Ed Embry	Halfback			5'11"	170	22
Artie Fuller	Fullback			5'11"	158	20
Rammy Ramsdell	Quarterback		Hillsborough	5'10"	150	21
Jim Sparkman	Halfback			5'8"	167	19
Harry K. Thompson	Halfback			5'7"	150	24

=== Subs ===
Player	Position	Games started	High school	Height	Weight	Age
Paul Collins	Line			5'10"	175	22
Fat DeVane	Guard			6'0"	205	20
Stock Stockton				5'9"	160	21

=== Coaching staff ===
- Head coach: Charles J. McCoy
- Assistant coach: Z. J. Stanley
- Manager: T. J. Swanson

== Bibliography ==
- McEwen, Tom (1974). The Gators: A Story of Florida Football. Huntsville, Alabama: The Strode Publishers. ISBN 0-87397-025-X.
- University of Florida (1916). The Seminole. Vol. 7.
