= 1915 Mercer Baptists football team =

American college football season

1915 Mercer Baptists football
- Conference: Southern Intercollegiate Athletic Association
- Record: 5–4 (2–3 SIAA)
- Head coach: Jake Zellars (1st season)
- Home stadium: Central City Park

1915 Southern Intercollegiate Athletic Association football standings
	Conf.					Overall
Team	W		L		T	W		L		T
Vanderbilt $	5	–	0	–	0	9	–	1	–	0
Alabama	5	–	0	–	0	6	–	2	–	0
LSU	4	–	0	–	0	6	–	2	–	0
Transylvania	3	–	0	–	1	7	–	1	–	1
Auburn	5	–	1	–	0	6	–	2	–	0
Georgia	3	–	1	–	1	5	–	2	–	2
Chattanooga	3	–	1	–	2	5	–	2	–	2
Mississippi A&M	4	–	2	–	1	5	–	2	–	1
Kentucky	2	–	1	–	1	6	–	1	–	1
Florida	3	–	3	–	0	4	–	3	–	0
Clemson	2	–	2	–	1	2	–	4	–	2
South Carolina	1	–	1	–	1	5	–	3	–	1
Furman	1	–	1	–	0	5	–	3	–	0
Mercer	2	–	3	–	0	5	–	4	–	0
Mississippi College	2	–	3	–	0	4	–	4	–	1
The Citadel	1	–	2	–	0	5	–	3	–	0
Sewanee	1	–	2	–	2	4	–	3	–	2
Tennessee	1	–	4	–	0	4	–	4	–	0
Tulane	1	–	4	–	0	4	–	4	–	0
Central University	0	–	3	–	1	3	–	5	–	1
Louisville	0	–	3	–	1	1	–	5	–	1
Howard (AL)	0	–	3	–	0	3	–	4	–	1
Wofford	0	–	3	–	0	3	–	5	–	0
Ole Miss	0	–	5	–	0	2	–	6	–	0
$ – Conference champion

The 1915 Mercer Baptists football team was an American football team that represented Mercer University as a member of the Southern Intercollegiate Athletic Association (SIAA) during the 1915 college football season. In their first year under head coach Jake Zellars, the team compiled an 5–4 record, with a mark of 2–3 in the SIAA.

== Schedule ==
Date	Opponent	Site	Result	Source
September 25	Gordon Institute*	Central City Park; Macon, GA	W 6–0	
October 2	at Georgia Tech*	Grant Field; Atlanta, GA	L 0–52	
October 11	Wofford	Central City Park; Macon, GA	W 6–0	
October 23	at Chattanooga	Chamberlain Field; Chattanooga, TN	L 6–20	
October 30	Howard (AL)	Central City Park; Macon, GA	W 14–7	
November 6	at Auburn	Drake Field; Auburn, AL	L 0–45	
November 12	at South Georgia College*	Coffee County Fairgrounds; Douglas, GA	W 20–0	
November 13	vs. Columbia College (FL)*	Valdosta, GA	W 32–0	
November 25	Florida	Central City Park; Macon, GA	L 7–34	\
*Non-conference game
