= 1915 South Carolina Gamecocks football team =

American college football season

1915 South Carolina Gamecocks football
- Conference: Southern Intercollegiate Athletic Association
- Record: 5–3–1 (1–1–1 SIAA)
- Head coach: Norman B. Edgerton (4th season)
- Captain: O. E. Going
- Home stadium: Davis Field

1915 Southern Intercollegiate Athletic Association football standings
	Conf.					Overall
Team	W		L		T	W		L		T
Vanderbilt $	5	–	0	–	0	9	–	1	–	0
Alabama	5	–	0	–	0	6	–	2	–	0
LSU	4	–	0	–	0	6	–	2	–	0
Transylvania	3	–	0	–	1	7	–	1	–	1
Auburn	5	–	1	–	0	6	–	2	–	0
Georgia	3	–	1	–	1	5	–	2	–	2
Chattanooga	3	–	1	–	2	5	–	2	–	2
Mississippi A&M	4	–	2	–	1	5	–	2	–	1
Kentucky	2	–	1	–	1	6	–	1	–	1
Florida	3	–	3	–	0	4	–	3	–	0
Clemson	2	–	2	–	1	2	–	4	–	2
South Carolina	1	–	1	–	1	5	–	3	–	1
Furman	1	–	1	–	0	5	–	3	–	0
Mercer	2	–	3	–	0	5	–	4	–	0
Mississippi College	2	–	3	–	0	4	–	4	–	1
The Citadel	1	–	2	–	0	5	–	3	–	0
Sewanee	1	–	2	–	2	4	–	3	–	2
Tennessee	1	–	4	–	0	4	–	4	–	0
Tulane	1	–	4	–	0	4	–	4	–	0
Central University	0	–	3	–	1	3	–	5	–	1
Louisville	0	–	3	–	1	1	–	5	–	1
Howard (AL)	0	–	3	–	0	3	–	4	–	1
Wofford	0	–	3	–	0	3	–	5	–	0
Ole Miss	0	–	5	–	0	2	–	6	–	0
$ – Conference champion

The 1915 South Carolina Gamecocks football team represented the University of South Carolina during the 1915 Southern Intercollegiate Athletic Association football season. It was the team's first season in the Southern Intercollegiate Athletic Association (SIAA). Led by Norman B. Edgerton in his fourth and final season as head coach, the Gamecocks compiled an overall record of 5–3–1 with a mark of 1–1–1 in SIAA play.

== Schedule ==
Date	Opponent	Site	Result	Source
October 2	Newberry	Davis Field; Columbia, SC	W 29–0	
October 9	Presbyterian	Davis Field; Columbia, SC	W 41–0	
October 21	at North Carolina A&M	Riddick Stadium; Raleigh, NC	W 19–10	
October 28	Clemson	State Fairgrounds; Columbia, SC	T 0–0	
October 30	Davidson	Davis Field; Columbia, SC	Canceled	
November 4	at Wofford	Spartanburg Fairgrounds; Spartanburg, SC	W 33–6	
November 6	Cumberland (TN)	Davis Field; Columbia, SC	W 68–0	
November 13	Virginia	Davis Field; Columbia, SC	L 0–13	
November 20	at Georgetown	Georgetown Field; Washington, DC	L 0–61	
November 25	The Citadel	Davis Field; Columbia, SC	L 0–3	
