= 1915 Kentucky Wildcats football team =

American college football season

1915 Kentucky Wildcats football
- Conference: Southern Intercollegiate Athletic Association
- Record: 6–1–1 (2–1–1 SIAA)
- Head coach: John J. Tigert (1st season)
- Captain: Charles C. Schrader

1915 Southern Intercollegiate Athletic Association football standings
| | Conf. | | | | | Overall |
| Team | W | | L | | T | W | | L | | T |
|---|---|---|---|---|---|---|---|---|---|---|
| Vanderbilt $ | 5 | – | 0 | – | 0 | 9 | – | 1 | – | 0 |
| Alabama | 5 | – | 0 | – | 0 | 6 | – | 2 | – | 0 |
| LSU | 4 | – | 0 | – | 0 | 6 | – | 2 | – | 0 |
| Transylvania | 3 | – | 0 | – | 1 | 7 | – | 1 | – | 1 |
| Auburn | 5 | – | 1 | – | 0 | 6 | – | 2 | – | 0 |
| Georgia | 3 | – | 1 | – | 1 | 5 | – | 2 | – | 2 |
| Chattanooga | 3 | – | 1 | – | 2 | 5 | – | 2 | – | 2 |
| Mississippi A&M | 4 | – | 2 | – | 1 | 5 | – | 2 | – | 1 |
| Kentucky | 2 | – | 1 | – | 1 | 6 | – | 1 | – | 1 |
| Florida | 3 | – | 3 | – | 0 | 4 | – | 3 | – | 0 |
| Clemson | 2 | – | 2 | – | 1 | 2 | – | 4 | – | 2 |
| South Carolina | 1 | – | 1 | – | 1 | 5 | – | 3 | – | 1 |
| Furman | 1 | – | 1 | – | 0 | 5 | – | 3 | – | 0 |
| Mercer | 2 | – | 3 | – | 0 | 5 | – | 4 | – | 0 |
| Mississippi College | 2 | – | 3 | – | 0 | 4 | – | 4 | – | 1 |
| The Citadel | 1 | – | 2 | – | 0 | 5 | – | 3 | – | 0 |
| Sewanee | 1 | – | 2 | – | 2 | 4 | – | 3 | – | 2 |
| Tennessee | 1 | – | 4 | – | 0 | 4 | – | 4 | – | 0 |
| Tulane | 1 | – | 4 | – | 0 | 4 | – | 4 | – | 0 |
| Central University | 0 | – | 3 | – | 1 | 3 | – | 5 | – | 1 |
| Louisville | 0 | – | 3 | – | 1 | 1 | – | 5 | – | 1 |
| Howard (AL) | 0 | – | 3 | – | 0 | 3 | – | 4 | – | 1 |
| Wofford | 0 | – | 3 | – | 0 | 3 | – | 5 | – | 0 |
| Ole Miss | 0 | – | 5 | – | 0 | 2 | – | 6 | – | 0 |
$ – Conference champion

The 1915 Kentucky Wildcats football team represented the University of Kentucky as a member of the Southern Intercollegiate Athletic Association (SIAA) during the 1915 college football season. Led by first-year head coach John J. Tigert, the Wildcats compiled an overall record of 6–1–1 with a mark 2–1–1 in SIAA play.

== Schedule ==
| Date | Opponent | Site | Result | Attendance | Source |
|---|---|---|---|---|---|
| October 2 | Butler* | Stoll Field; Lexington, KY | W 33–0 | | |
| October 9 | Earlham* | Stoll Field; Lexington, KY | W 54–13 | | |
| October 16 | Mississippi A&M | New Athletic Field; Starkville, MS | L 0–12 | | |
| October 23 | Sewanee | Stoll Field; Lexington, KY | T 7–7 | 5,000 | |
| October 30 | Cincinnati* | Stoll Field; Lexington, KY | W 27–6 | | |
| November 6 | at Louisville | Eclipse Park; Louisville, KY (rivalry) | W 15–0 | 4,000 | |
| November 13 | Purdue* | Stoll Field; Lexington, KY | W 7–0 | | |
| November 25 | Tennessee | Stoll Field; Lexington, KY (rivalry) | W 6–0 | | |
*Non-conference game
