= 1915 Alabama Crimson Tide football team =

American college football season

1915 Alabama Crimson Tide football
- Conference: Southern Intercollegiate Athletic Association
- Record: 6–2 (5–0 SIAA)
- Head coach: Thomas Kelley (1st season)
- Captain: William L. Harsh
- Home stadium: University Field; Rickwood Field

1915 Southern Intercollegiate Athletic Association football standings
	Conf.					Overall
Team	W		L		T	W		L		T
Vanderbilt $	5	–	0	–	0	9	–	1	–	0
Alabama	5	–	0	–	0	6	–	2	–	0
LSU	4	–	0	–	0	6	–	2	–	0
Transylvania	3	–	0	–	1	7	–	1	–	1
Auburn	5	–	1	–	0	6	–	2	–	0
Georgia	3	–	1	–	1	5	–	2	–	2
Chattanooga	3	–	1	–	2	5	–	2	–	2
Mississippi A&M	4	–	2	–	1	5	–	2	–	1
Kentucky	2	–	1	–	1	6	–	1	–	1
Florida	3	–	3	–	0	4	–	3	–	0
Clemson	2	–	2	–	1	2	–	4	–	2
South Carolina	1	–	1	–	1	5	–	3	–	1
Furman	1	–	1	–	0	5	–	3	–	0
Mercer	2	–	3	–	0	5	–	4	–	0
Mississippi College	2	–	3	–	0	4	–	4	–	1
The Citadel	1	–	2	–	0	5	–	3	–	0
Sewanee	1	–	2	–	2	4	–	3	–	2
Tennessee	1	–	4	–	0	4	–	4	–	0
Tulane	1	–	4	–	0	4	–	4	–	0
Central University	0	–	3	–	1	3	–	5	–	1
Louisville	0	–	3	–	1	1	–	5	–	1
Howard (AL)	0	–	3	–	0	3	–	4	–	1
Wofford	0	–	3	–	0	3	–	5	–	0
Ole Miss	0	–	5	–	0	2	–	6	–	0
$ – Conference champion

The 1915 Alabama Crimson Tide football team (variously "Alabama", "UA" or "Bama") represented the University of Alabama in the 1915 Southern Intercollegiate Athletic Association football season. It was the Crimson Tide's 23rd overall and 20th season as a member of the Southern Intercollegiate Athletic Association (SIAA). The team was led by head coach Thomas Kelley, in his first year. It was in 1915 Alabama moved its on campus home games from The Quad, where all on-campus home games had been played since 1893, and to a new location, University Field (later renamed Denny Field in honor of school president George Denny in 1920). Home games were also played at Rickwood Field in Birmingham, Alabama. They finished the season with an overall record of 6–2 record and mark of 5–0 in the SIAA.

William T. "Bully" Van de Graaff, who punted, kicked, and played tackle, was named Alabama's first All-American in 1915, when was selected second-team All-America by Walter Camp.

Alabama opened the season 5-0 with four shutout victories and a 23-10 win over Sewanee. Against Mississippi College Van de Graaff kicked four field goals and missed a fifth from 54 yards out when the ball hit the upright. The victory over Sewanee was the first for Alabama in that series since 1894. Alabama led the Tigers 10–0 at the half and continued to lead by that score after Sewanee marched inside the Alabama 20 four times in the third but came away with no points. The Tigers finally scored a touchdown on the first play of the fourth quarter, then blocked a punt and kicked a field goal to tie the game 10–10. However, Van de Graff knocked the ball out of a Sewanee player's hand and ran it back 65 yards for a touchdown, then tacked on two more field goals as the Tide beat the Tigers for only the second time in 12 meetings.

Coach Kelley was hospitalized with typhoid fever two days prior to the Tulane game, and as a result missed the last five games of the season. Athletic director B. L. Noojin and former quarterback Farley Moody then served as co-head coaches for the remainder of the season. The 1915 season in its entirety is still officially credited to Kelley.

== Schedule ==
Date	Opponent	Site	Result	Source
October 2	Howard (AL)	University Field; Tuscaloosa, AL	W 44–0	
October 9	Birmingham*	University Field; Tuscaloosa, AL	W 67–0	
October 16	Mississippi College	University Field; Tuscaloosa, AL	W 40–0	
October 23	Tulane	University Field; Tuscaloosa, AL	W 16–0	
October 30	Sewanee	Rickwood Field; Birmingham, AL	W 23–10	
November 6	at Georgia Tech*	Grant Field; Atlanta, GA (rivalry)	L 7–21	
November 13	at Texas*	Clark Field; Austin, TX	L 0–20	
November 25	Ole Miss	Rickwood Field; Birmingham, AL (rivalry)	W 53–0	
*Non-conference game

== Awards ==
William T. Van de Graaff was selected to the 1915 College Football All-America Team. His selection was the first ever for an Alabama football player.
