= 1915 Ole Miss Rebels football team =

American college football season

1915 Ole Miss Rebels football
- Conference: Southern Intercollegiate Athletic Association
- Record: 2–6 (0–5 SIAA)
- Head coach: Fred A. Robins (1st season)
- Home stadium: Hemingway Stadium

1915 Southern Intercollegiate Athletic Association football standings
	Conf.					Overall
Team	W		L		T	W		L		T
Vanderbilt $	5	–	0	–	0	9	–	1	–	0
Alabama	5	–	0	–	0	6	–	2	–	0
LSU	4	–	0	–	0	6	–	2	–	0
Transylvania	3	–	0	–	1	7	–	1	–	1
Auburn	5	–	1	–	0	6	–	2	–	0
Georgia	3	–	1	–	1	5	–	2	–	2
Chattanooga	3	–	1	–	2	5	–	2	–	2
Mississippi A&M	4	–	2	–	1	5	–	2	–	1
Kentucky	2	–	1	–	1	6	–	1	–	1
Florida	3	–	3	–	0	4	–	3	–	0
Clemson	2	–	2	–	1	2	–	4	–	2
South Carolina	1	–	1	–	1	5	–	3	–	1
Furman	1	–	1	–	0	5	–	3	–	0
Mercer	2	–	3	–	0	5	–	4	–	0
Mississippi College	2	–	3	–	0	4	–	4	–	1
The Citadel	1	–	2	–	0	5	–	3	–	0
Sewanee	1	–	2	–	2	4	–	3	–	2
Tennessee	1	–	4	–	0	4	–	4	–	0
Tulane	1	–	4	–	0	4	–	4	–	0
Central University	0	–	3	–	1	3	–	5	–	1
Louisville	0	–	3	–	1	1	–	5	–	1
Howard (AL)	0	–	3	–	0	3	–	4	–	1
Wofford	0	–	3	–	0	3	–	5	–	0
Ole Miss	0	–	5	–	0	2	–	6	–	0
$ – Conference champion

The 1915 Ole Miss Rebels football team represented the University of Mississippi (Ole Miss) as a member of the Southern Intercollegiate Athletic Association (SIAA) during the 1915 college football season. Led by first-year head coach Fred A. Robins, the Rebels compiled an overall record of 2–6, with a mark of 0–5 in conference play. Ole Miss played home games at Hemingway Stadium in Oxford, Mississippi.

== Schedule ==
Date	Opponent	Site	Result	Attendance	Source
October 1	Jonesboro Aggies*	Hemingway Stadium; Oxford, MS	L 0–10		
October 8	Southwestern Presbyterian*	Hemingway Stadium; Oxford, MS	W 13–6		
October 15	LSU	Hemingway Stadium; Oxford, MS (rivalry)	L 0–28	600	
October 23	vs. Vanderbilt	Russwood Park; Memphis, TN (rivalry)	L 0–91		
October 29	Hendrix*	Hemingway Stadium; Oxford, MS	W 32–7		
November 6	vs. Mississippi A&M	Fair Grounds; Tupelo, MS (rivalry)	L 0–65	7,000	
November 13	at Mississippi College	State Fairgrounds; Jackson, MS	L 6–74		
November 25	at Alabama	Rickwood Field; Birmingham, AL (rivalry)	L 0–53		
*Non-conference game
