= 1915 Transylvania Crimsons football team =

American college football season

1915 Transylvania Crimsons football
- Conference: Southern Intercollegiate Athletic Association
- Record: 7–1–1 (3–0–1 SIAA)
- Head coach: Willis T. Stewart (3rd season)

1915 Southern Intercollegiate Athletic Association football standings
| | Conf. | | | | | Overall |
| Team | W | | L | | T | W | | L | | T |
|---|---|---|---|---|---|---|---|---|---|---|
| Vanderbilt $ | 5 | – | 0 | – | 0 | 9 | – | 1 | – | 0 |
| Alabama | 5 | – | 0 | – | 0 | 6 | – | 2 | – | 0 |
| LSU | 4 | – | 0 | – | 0 | 6 | – | 2 | – | 0 |
| Transylvania | 3 | – | 0 | – | 1 | 7 | – | 1 | – | 1 |
| Auburn | 5 | – | 1 | – | 0 | 6 | – | 2 | – | 0 |
| Georgia | 3 | – | 1 | – | 1 | 5 | – | 2 | – | 2 |
| Chattanooga | 3 | – | 1 | – | 2 | 5 | – | 2 | – | 2 |
| Mississippi A&M | 4 | – | 2 | – | 1 | 5 | – | 2 | – | 1 |
| Kentucky | 2 | – | 1 | – | 1 | 6 | – | 1 | – | 1 |
| Florida | 3 | – | 3 | – | 0 | 4 | – | 3 | – | 0 |
| Clemson | 2 | – | 2 | – | 1 | 2 | – | 4 | – | 2 |
| South Carolina | 1 | – | 1 | – | 1 | 5 | – | 3 | – | 1 |
| Furman | 1 | – | 1 | – | 0 | 5 | – | 3 | – | 0 |
| Mercer | 2 | – | 3 | – | 0 | 5 | – | 4 | – | 0 |
| Mississippi College | 2 | – | 3 | – | 0 | 4 | – | 4 | – | 1 |
| The Citadel | 1 | – | 2 | – | 0 | 5 | – | 3 | – | 0 |
| Sewanee | 1 | – | 2 | – | 2 | 4 | – | 3 | – | 2 |
| Tennessee | 1 | – | 4 | – | 0 | 4 | – | 4 | – | 0 |
| Tulane | 1 | – | 4 | – | 0 | 4 | – | 4 | – | 0 |
| Central University | 0 | – | 3 | – | 1 | 3 | – | 5 | – | 1 |
| Louisville | 0 | – | 3 | – | 1 | 1 | – | 5 | – | 1 |
| Howard (AL) | 0 | – | 3 | – | 0 | 3 | – | 4 | – | 1 |
| Wofford | 0 | – | 3 | – | 0 | 3 | – | 5 | – | 0 |
| Ole Miss | 0 | – | 5 | – | 0 | 2 | – | 6 | – | 0 |
$ – Conference champion

The 1915 Transylvania Crimsons football team represented Transylvania University during the 1915 Southern Intercollegiate Athletic Association football season. Led by third-year head coach Willis T. Stewart, the Crimsons compiled an overall record of 7–1–1 with a mark of 3–0–1 in SIAA play.

== Schedule ==
| Date | Time | Opponent | Site | Result | Source |
|---|---|---|---|---|---|
| September 25 | | Ohio* | Thomas Field; Lexington, KY | W 16–0 | |
| October 1 | | Kentucky Military Institute* | Thomas Field; Lexington, KY | W 27–0 | |
| October 9 | | at Mississippi A&M | New Athletic Field; Starkville, MS | T 0–0 | |
| October 12 | | vs. Southwestern Presbyterian* | Athletic Park; Nashville, TN | W 26–0 | |
| October 16 | 3:05 p.m. | at Georgia Tech* | Grant Field; Atlanta, GA | L 0–57 | |
| November 6 | | at Chattanooga | Chamberlain Field; Chattanooga, TN | W 17–0 | |
| November 12 | | Central University | Thomas Field; Lexington, KY | W 39–0 | |
| November 19 | | at Georgetown (KY)* | Hinton Field; Georgetown, KY | W 14–6 | |
| November 25 | | at Louisville* | Eclipse Park; Louisville, KY | W 26–0 | |
*Non-conference game
