= Fred A. Robins =

American football and baseball coach

Biographical details
- Born: December 17, 1890; Tupelo, Mississippi, U.S.
- Died: September 30, 1926 (aged 35)

Playing career
- 1910–1912: Vanderbilt
- Positions: Quarterback, halfback

Coaching career (HC unless noted)

Football
- 1914: Mercer
- 1915–1916: Ole Miss

Baseball
- 1915: Mercer
- 1916: Ole Miss

Head coaching record
- Overall: 10–16 (football); 18–21 (baseball)

Fred Allen "Rabbi" Robins (December 17, 1890 – September 30, 1926) was an American college football and college baseball coach. He served as the head football coach at Mercer University in 1914 prior to accepting the head coaching position with the University of Mississippi in May 1915. While at Mississippi, Robbins compiled a record of 5–12. He played for coach Dan McGugin's Vanderbilt teams. His skills better suited to the mud, he played quarterback and led the team to its largest win in its history, a 105 to 0 win over Bethel in 1912. He was shot and killed on September 30, 1926 after a friend's pistol accidentally discharged.

== Head coaching record ==
=== Football ===
Year	Team	Overall	Conference	Standing	Bowl/playoffs
Mercer Baptists (Southern Intercollegiate Athletic Association) (1914)
1914	Mercer	5–4			
Mercer:		5–4			
Ole Miss Rebels (Southern Intercollegiate Athletic Association) (1915–1916)
1915	Ole Miss	2–6			
1916	Ole Miss	3–6			
Ole Miss:		5–12			
Total:		10–16			
