= 1915 Clemson Tigers football team =

American college football season

1915 Clemson Tigers football
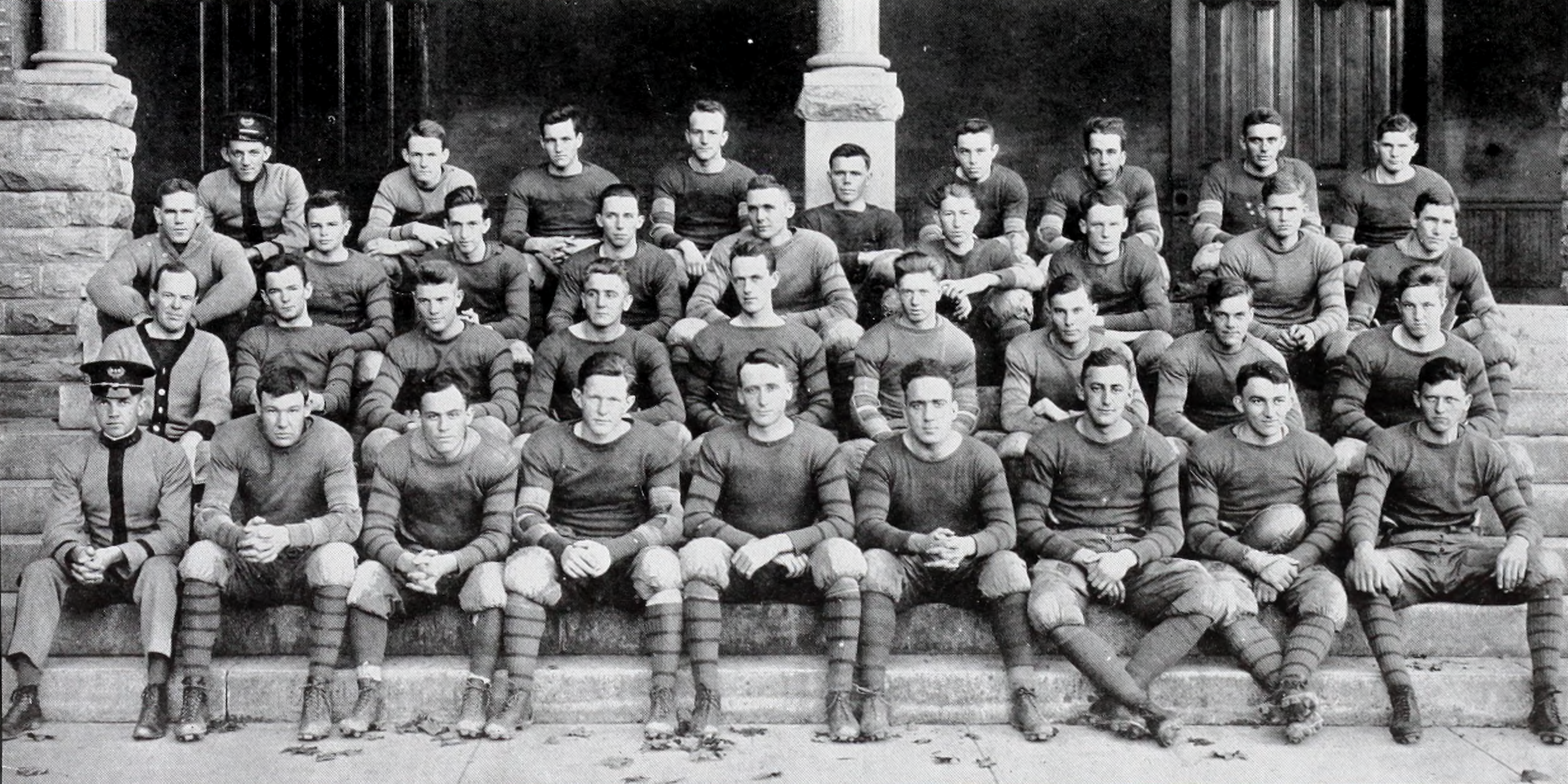
- Conference: Southern Intercollegiate Athletic Association
- Record: 2–4–2 (2–2–1 SIAA)
- Head coach: Bob Williams (5th season)
- Captain: W. K. McGill
- Home stadium: Riggs Field

1915 Southern Intercollegiate Athletic Association football standings
| | Conf. | | | | | Overall |
| Team | W | | L | | T | W | | L | | T |
|---|---|---|---|---|---|---|---|---|---|---|
| Vanderbilt $ | 5 | – | 0 | – | 0 | 9 | – | 1 | – | 0 |
| Alabama | 5 | – | 0 | – | 0 | 6 | – | 2 | – | 0 |
| LSU | 4 | – | 0 | – | 0 | 6 | – | 2 | – | 0 |
| Transylvania | 3 | – | 0 | – | 1 | 7 | – | 1 | – | 1 |
| Auburn | 5 | – | 1 | – | 0 | 6 | – | 2 | – | 0 |
| Georgia | 3 | – | 1 | – | 1 | 5 | – | 2 | – | 2 |
| Chattanooga | 3 | – | 1 | – | 2 | 5 | – | 2 | – | 2 |
| Mississippi A&M | 4 | – | 2 | – | 1 | 5 | – | 2 | – | 1 |
| Kentucky | 2 | – | 1 | – | 1 | 6 | – | 1 | – | 1 |
| Florida | 3 | – | 3 | – | 0 | 4 | – | 3 | – | 0 |
| Clemson | 2 | – | 2 | – | 1 | 2 | – | 4 | – | 2 |
| South Carolina | 1 | – | 1 | – | 1 | 5 | – | 3 | – | 1 |
| Furman | 1 | – | 1 | – | 0 | 5 | – | 3 | – | 0 |
| Mercer | 2 | – | 3 | – | 0 | 5 | – | 4 | – | 0 |
| Mississippi College | 2 | – | 3 | – | 0 | 4 | – | 4 | – | 1 |
| The Citadel | 1 | – | 2 | – | 0 | 5 | – | 3 | – | 0 |
| Sewanee | 1 | – | 2 | – | 2 | 4 | – | 3 | – | 2 |
| Tennessee | 1 | – | 4 | – | 0 | 4 | – | 4 | – | 0 |
| Tulane | 1 | – | 4 | – | 0 | 4 | – | 4 | – | 0 |
| Central University | 0 | – | 3 | – | 1 | 3 | – | 5 | – | 1 |
| Louisville | 0 | – | 3 | – | 1 | 1 | – | 5 | – | 1 |
| Howard (AL) | 0 | – | 3 | – | 0 | 3 | – | 4 | – | 1 |
| Wofford | 0 | – | 3 | – | 0 | 3 | – | 5 | – | 0 |
| Ole Miss | 0 | – | 5 | – | 0 | 2 | – | 6 | – | 0 |
$ – Conference champion

The 1915 Clemson Tigers football team represented Clemson Agricultural College—now known as Clemson University—as a member of the Southern Intercollegiate Athletic Association (SIAA) during the 1915 college football season. Under fifth-year head coach Bob Williams, the team compiled an overall record of 2–4–2 record with a mark of 2–2–1 in SIAA play. W. K. McGill was the team captain. Riggs Field was introduced as Clemson's new home stadium in 1915. Riggs hosted the football team until Memorial Stadium was built in 1942.

== Schedule ==
| Date | Time | Opponent | Site | Result | Source |
|---|---|---|---|---|---|
| September 25 | 4:00 p.m. | at Furman | Augusta Street Park; Greenville, SC | W 99–0 | |
| October 2 | | Davidson* | Riggs Field; Calhoun, SC | T 6–6 | |
| October 9 | | at Tennessee | Waite Field; Knoxville, TN | W 3–0 | |
| October 16 | | vs. Auburn | Anderson, SC (rivalry) | L 0–14 | |
| October 28 | | at South Carolina | State Fairgrounds; Columbia, SC (rivalry) | T 0–0 | |
| November 6 | | vs. North Carolina* | Greenville, SC | L 7–9 | |
| November 13 | 3:00 p.m. | vs. VMI* | Broad Street Park; Richmond, VA | L 3–6 | |
| November 25 | | at Georgia | Sanford Field; Athens, GA (rivalry) | L 0–13 | |
*Non-conference game

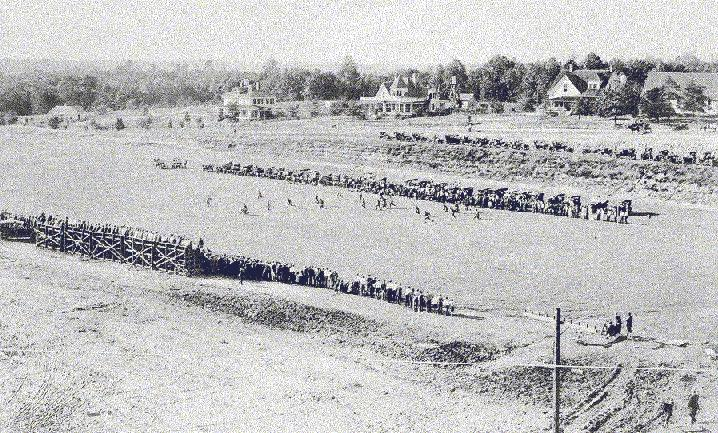
The inauguration of Riggs Field in 1915

== Bibliography ==
- Bourret, Tim. "2010 Clemson Football Media Guide" (PDF). Clemson University. p. 202. Archived from the original (PDF) on November 12, 2012.
