= Tom Lipscomb =

American football player

- Lipscomb cropped from the 1914 team photo

Profile
- Position: Guard/Tackle

Personal information
- Listed height: 6 ft 0 in (1.83 m)
- Listed weight: 205 lb (93 kg)

Career information
- College: Vanderbilt (1914–1915; 1919)

Awards and highlights
- SIAA championship (1915); All-Southern (1919)

Thomas Lipscomb was a college football player.

== Vanderbilt ==
Lipscomb was a prominent tackle and guard for Dan McGugin's Vanderbilt Commodores football teams, playing opposite Josh Cody.

=== 1915 ===
He and Cody blocked a punt in the game against Sewanee for the Southern Intercollegiate Athletic Association (SIAA) championship in 1915.

=== 1919 ===
In the game against SIAA champion Auburn in 1919, he and Frank Goar were sent in on Auburn's last drive. Goar had been sick and Lipscomb was suffering from an injured ankle. The two spurned the team to victory in what the yearbook called "the greatest defensive stand ever staged by any Vanderbilt team." It was Auburn's only loss. Lipscomb was selected All-Southern by some writers the same year, including Zipp Newman.
