= Everett Yon =

American football player

Biographical details
- Born: January 13, 1895; Blountstown, Florida, US
- Died: November 25, 1965 (aged 70); Gainesville, Florida, US
- Education: University of Florida

Playing career

Football
- 1914–1915: Florida

Baseball
- 1915–1916: Florida
- Position: Tackle

Coaching career (HC unless noted)
- 1923–1924: Florida (assistant)

Administrative career (AD unless noted)
- 1925–1928: Florida

Col. Everett Marion Yon, Sr. (January 13, 1895 – November 25, 1965) was a decorated U.S. Army officer, athlete, coach and athletics administrator. Yon was director of athletics at the University of Florida in Gainesville from 1925–28.

Yon played for the Florida Gators football team in 1914 and 1915, and the Gators baseball team in 1915 and 1916. His career was cut short when he was called by the National Guard to defend the Mexican border in the Battle of Columbus in the spring of 1916. He graduated a few months later before serving in the first World War. He then attended the United States Army Infantry School in Fort Benning, Georgia, before returning to Gainesville in 1923 as a football coach and an ROTC instructor.

He was a line coach at his alma mater under Gen. James Van Fleet from 1923–25. He was appointed athletic director in 1925 but was forced to leave in 1928 when his unit was reactivated. Yon returned to the university after World War II, when he commanded the 25th Infantry in Bougainville Island. During his distinguished career, he was awarded the Bronze Star, the Legion of Merit twice and the Silver Star.

Yon was later president of the university's booster club. He was the director of Public Relations at the athletic department at the time of his death in 1965, following a long illness.

He was the father of Everett Marion Yon, Jr., a West Point graduate with the class of 1956.

== See also ==
- List of University of Florida Athletic Hall of Fame members
