= 1915 The Citadel Bulldogs football team =

American college football season

1915 The Citadel Bulldogs football

State champion
- Conference: Southern Intercollegiate Athletic Association
- Record: 5–3 (1–2 SIAA)
- Head coach: George C. Rogers (3rd season)
- Captain: Francis Sheppard
- Home stadium: College Park Stadium

1915 Southern Intercollegiate Athletic Association football standings
| | Conf. | | | | | Overall |
| Team | W | | L | | T | W | | L | | T |
|---|---|---|---|---|---|---|---|---|---|---|
| Vanderbilt $ | 5 | – | 0 | – | 0 | 9 | – | 1 | – | 0 |
| Alabama | 5 | – | 0 | – | 0 | 6 | – | 2 | – | 0 |
| LSU | 4 | – | 0 | – | 0 | 6 | – | 2 | – | 0 |
| Transylvania | 3 | – | 0 | – | 1 | 7 | – | 1 | – | 1 |
| Auburn | 5 | – | 1 | – | 0 | 6 | – | 2 | – | 0 |
| Georgia | 3 | – | 1 | – | 1 | 5 | – | 2 | – | 2 |
| Chattanooga | 3 | – | 1 | – | 2 | 5 | – | 2 | – | 2 |
| Mississippi A&M | 4 | – | 2 | – | 1 | 5 | – | 2 | – | 1 |
| Kentucky | 2 | – | 1 | – | 1 | 6 | – | 1 | – | 1 |
| Florida | 3 | – | 3 | – | 0 | 4 | – | 3 | – | 0 |
| Clemson | 2 | – | 2 | – | 1 | 2 | – | 4 | – | 2 |
| South Carolina | 1 | – | 1 | – | 1 | 5 | – | 3 | – | 1 |
| Furman | 1 | – | 1 | – | 0 | 5 | – | 3 | – | 0 |
| Mercer | 2 | – | 3 | – | 0 | 5 | – | 4 | – | 0 |
| Mississippi College | 2 | – | 3 | – | 0 | 4 | – | 4 | – | 1 |
| The Citadel | 1 | – | 2 | – | 0 | 5 | – | 3 | – | 0 |
| Sewanee | 1 | – | 2 | – | 2 | 4 | – | 3 | – | 2 |
| Tennessee | 1 | – | 4 | – | 0 | 4 | – | 4 | – | 0 |
| Tulane | 1 | – | 4 | – | 0 | 4 | – | 4 | – | 0 |
| Central University | 0 | – | 3 | – | 1 | 3 | – | 5 | – | 1 |
| Louisville | 0 | – | 3 | – | 1 | 1 | – | 5 | – | 1 |
| Howard (AL) | 0 | – | 3 | – | 0 | 3 | – | 4 | – | 1 |
| Wofford | 0 | – | 3 | – | 0 | 3 | – | 5 | – | 0 |
| Ole Miss | 0 | – | 5 | – | 0 | 2 | – | 6 | – | 0 |
$ – Conference champion

The 1915 The Citadel Bulldogs football team represented The Citadel as a member of the Southern Intercollegiate Athletic Association (SIAA) during the 1915 college football season. Led by third-year head coach George C. Rogers, the Bulldogs compiled an overall record of 5–3 with a mark of 1–2 in SIAA play. The Citadel claims a "State Championship" for 1915 by virtue of its wins over Presbyterian and South Carolina. The Bulldogs played home games at College Park Stadium in Hampton Park.

== Schedule ==
| Date | Opponent | Site | Result | Source |
|---|---|---|---|---|
| September 25 | Charleston Navy* | College Park Stadium; Charleston, SC | W 46–0 | |
| October 2 | at North Carolina* | Class Field; Chapel Hill, NC | L 7–14 | |
| October 9 | Porter Military Academy* | College Park Stadium; Charleston, SC | W 54–0 | |
| October 16 | Georgia | College Park Stadium; Charleston, SC | L 0–39 | |
| October 27 | vs. Presbyterian* | State Fairgrounds; Columbia, SC | W 14–0 | |
| November 6 | Newberry* | College Park Stadium; Charleston, SC | W 48–3 | |
| November 13 | at Florida | Fleming Field; Gainesville, FL | L 0–6 | |
| November 25 | at South Carolina | Davis Field; Columbia, SC | W 3–0 | |
*Non-conference game
