= 1915 Georgia Bulldogs football team =

American college football season

1915 Georgia Bulldogs football
- Conference: Southern Intercollegiate Athletic Association
- Record: 5–2–2 (3–1–1 SIAA)
- Head coach: W. A. Cunningham (6th season)
- Captain: John G. Henderson
- Home stadium: Sanford Field

Uniform
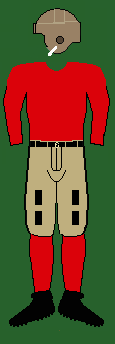

1915 Southern Intercollegiate Athletic Association football standings
	Conf.					Overall
Team	W		L		T	W		L		T
Vanderbilt $	5	–	0	–	0	9	–	1	–	0
Alabama	5	–	0	–	0	6	–	2	–	0
LSU	4	–	0	–	0	6	–	2	–	0
Transylvania	3	–	0	–	1	7	–	1	–	1
Auburn	5	–	1	–	0	6	–	2	–	0
Georgia	3	–	1	–	1	5	–	2	–	2
Chattanooga	3	–	1	–	2	5	–	2	–	2
Mississippi A&M	4	–	2	–	1	5	–	2	–	1
Kentucky	2	–	1	–	1	6	–	1	–	1
Florida	3	–	3	–	0	4	–	3	–	0
Clemson	2	–	2	–	1	2	–	4	–	2
South Carolina	1	–	1	–	1	5	–	3	–	1
Furman	1	–	1	–	0	5	–	3	–	0
Mercer	2	–	3	–	0	5	–	4	–	0
Mississippi College	2	–	3	–	0	4	–	4	–	1
The Citadel	1	–	2	–	0	5	–	3	–	0
Sewanee	1	–	2	–	2	4	–	3	–	2
Tennessee	1	–	4	–	0	4	–	4	–	0
Tulane	1	–	4	–	0	4	–	4	–	0
Central University	0	–	3	–	1	3	–	5	–	1
Louisville	0	–	3	–	1	1	–	5	–	1
Howard (AL)	0	–	3	–	0	3	–	4	–	1
Wofford	0	–	3	–	0	3	–	5	–	0
Ole Miss	0	–	5	–	0	2	–	6	–	0
$ – Conference champion

The 1915 Georgia Bulldogs football team represented the University of Georgia during the 1915 college football season. The Bulldogs completed the season with a 5–2–2 record. Due to the loss to Auburn, Georgia finished 3–1–1 in the SIAA.

The only blemish on in-state rival Georgia Tech's record was a scoreless tie with Georgia. John G. Henderson headed a group of three men, one behind the other with his hands upon the shoulders of the one in front, to counter Heisman's jump shift offense.

== Schedule ==
Date	Opponent	Site	Result	Source
September 25	Newberry*	Sanford Field; Athens, GA	W 76–0	
October 1	North Georgia*	Sanford Field; Athens, GA	W 64–0	
October 9	at Chattanooga	Chamberlain Field; Chattanooga, TN	T 6–6	
October 16	at The Citadel	College Park Stadium; Charleston, SC	W 39–0	
October 23	Virginia*	Sanford Field; Athens, GA	L 7–9	
October 30	Auburn	Sanford Field; Athens, GA (rivalry)	L 0–12	
November 6	vs. Florida	Barrs Field; Jacksonville, FL (rivalry)	W 37–0	
November 13	at Georgia Tech*	Grant Field; Atlanta, GA (rivalry)	T 0–0	
November 25	Clemson	Sanford Field; Athens, GA (rivalry)	W 13–0	
*Non-conference game
