= 1915 Central University football team =

American college football season

1915 Central University football
- Conference: Southern Intercollegiate Athletic Association
- Record: 3–5–1 (0–3–1 SIAA)
- Head coach: Orville B. Littick (1st season)
- Home stadium: Cheek Field

1915 Southern Intercollegiate Athletic Association football standings
	Conf.					Overall
Team	W		L		T	W		L		T
Vanderbilt $	5	–	0	–	0	9	–	1	–	0
Alabama	5	–	0	–	0	6	–	2	–	0
LSU	4	–	0	–	0	6	–	2	–	0
Transylvania	3	–	0	–	1	7	–	1	–	1
Auburn	5	–	1	–	0	6	–	2	–	0
Georgia	3	–	1	–	1	5	–	2	–	2
Chattanooga	3	–	1	–	2	5	–	2	–	2
Mississippi A&M	4	–	2	–	1	5	–	2	–	1
Kentucky	2	–	1	–	1	6	–	1	–	1
Florida	3	–	3	–	0	4	–	3	–	0
Clemson	2	–	2	–	1	2	–	4	–	2
South Carolina	1	–	1	–	1	5	–	3	–	1
Furman	1	–	1	–	0	5	–	3	–	0
Mercer	2	–	3	–	0	5	–	4	–	0
Mississippi College	2	–	3	–	0	4	–	4	–	1
The Citadel	1	–	2	–	0	5	–	3	–	0
Sewanee	1	–	2	–	2	4	–	3	–	2
Tennessee	1	–	4	–	0	4	–	4	–	0
Tulane	1	–	4	–	0	4	–	4	–	0
Central University	0	–	3	–	1	3	–	5	–	1
Louisville	0	–	3	–	1	1	–	5	–	1
Howard (AL)	0	–	3	–	0	3	–	4	–	1
Wofford	0	–	3	–	0	3	–	5	–	0
Ole Miss	0	–	5	–	0	2	–	6	–	0
$ – Conference champion

The 1915 Central University football team represented Central University of Kentucky (now known as Centre College) as a member the Southern Intercollegiate Athletic Association (SIAA) during the 1915 college football season. Led by first-year head coach Orville B. Littick, the team compiled an overall record of 3–5–1, with a mark of 0–3–1 in conference play.

== Schedule ==
Date	Opponent	Site	Result	Source
September 25	Kentucky School for the Deaf*	Cheek Field; Danville, KY	W 6–0	
October 2	at Louisville	Eclipse Park; Louisville, KY	T 0–0	
October 9	Kentucky Military Institute*	Cheek Field; Danville, KY	W 12–6	
October 16	at Tennessee	Waite Field; Knoxville, TN	L 0–80	
October 22	Marshall*	Cheek Field; Danville, KY	W 10–6	
October 29	at Kentucky Wesleyan*	Owensboro, KY	L 6–7	
November 5	Georgetown (KY)*	Cheek Field; Danville, KY	L 3–19	
November 12	at Transylvania	Thomas Field; Lexington, KY	L 0–39	
November 25	at Chattanooga	Chamberlain Field; Chattanooga, TN	L 0–33	
*Non-conference game
