= 1915 Auburn Tigers football team =

American college football season

1915 Auburn Tigers football
- Conference: Southern Intercollegiate Athletic Association
- Record: 6–2 (5–1 SIAA)
- Head coach: Mike Donahue (11th season)
- Base defense: 7–2–2
- Captain: P. R. Bidez
- Home stadium: Drake Field; Rickwood Field

1915 Southern Intercollegiate Athletic Association football standings
	Conf.					Overall
Team	W		L		T	W		L		T
Vanderbilt $	5	–	0	–	0	9	–	1	–	0
Alabama	5	–	0	–	0	6	–	2	–	0
LSU	4	–	0	–	0	6	–	2	–	0
Transylvania	3	–	0	–	1	7	–	1	–	1
Auburn	5	–	1	–	0	6	–	2	–	0
Georgia	3	–	1	–	1	5	–	2	–	2
Chattanooga	3	–	1	–	2	5	–	2	–	2
Mississippi A&M	4	–	2	–	1	5	–	2	–	1
Kentucky	2	–	1	–	1	6	–	1	–	1
Florida	3	–	3	–	0	4	–	3	–	0
Clemson	2	–	2	–	1	2	–	4	–	2
South Carolina	1	–	1	–	1	5	–	3	–	1
Furman	1	–	1	–	0	5	–	3	–	0
Mercer	2	–	3	–	0	5	–	4	–	0
Mississippi College	2	–	3	–	0	4	–	4	–	1
The Citadel	1	–	2	–	0	5	–	3	–	0
Sewanee	1	–	2	–	2	4	–	3	–	2
Tennessee	1	–	4	–	0	4	–	4	–	0
Tulane	1	–	4	–	0	4	–	4	–	0
Central University	0	–	3	–	1	3	–	5	–	1
Louisville	0	–	3	–	1	1	–	5	–	1
Howard (AL)	0	–	3	–	0	3	–	4	–	1
Wofford	0	–	3	–	0	3	–	5	–	0
Ole Miss	0	–	5	–	0	2	–	6	–	0
$ – Conference champion

The 1915 Auburn Tigers football team represented Auburn University in the 1915 Southern Intercollegiate Athletic Association football season. It was the Tigers' 24th season and they competed as a member of the Southern Intercollegiate Athletic Association (SIAA). The team was led by head coach Mike Donahue, in his 11th year, and played their home games at Drake Field in Auburn, Alabama. They finished with a record of six wins and two losses (6–2 overall, 5–1 in the SIAA).

== Before the season ==
Baby Taylor was the only regular left at the start of the 1915 season.

== Schedule ==
Date	Opponent	Site	Result	Source
October 1	at Marion*	Riverside Park; Selma, AL	W 78–0	
October 9	Florida	Drake Field; Auburn, AL (rivalry)	W 7–0	
October 16	at Clemson	Anderson, SC (rivalry)	W 14–0	
October 23	Mississippi A&M	Rickwood Field; Birmingham, AL	W 26–0	
October 30	at Georgia	Sanford Field; Athens, GA (rivalry)	W 12–0	
November 6	Mercer	Drake Field; Auburn, AL	W 45–0	
November 13	Vanderbilt	Rickwood Field; Birmingham, AL	L 0–17	
November 25	at Georgia Tech*	Grant Field; Atlanta, GA (rivalry)	L 0–7	
*Non-conference game

== Game summaries ==
=== Marion Military Institute ===
The season starts with a big 78–0 victory over Marion Military Institute.

=== Florida ===
Florida at Auburn

	1	2	3	4	Total
Florida	0	0	0	0	0
• Auburn	0	0	0	7	7

- Date: October 9
- Location: Drake Field
  Auburn, Alabama
- Referee: John Counselman

Auburn defeated Florida 7–0. Florida played hard for three quarters, until Wren scored the winning touchdown in the final period.

The starting lineup was Robinson (left end), Sample (left tackle), Taylor (left guard), Campbell (center), Fricks (right guard), Wynne (right tackle), Bonner (right end), Caughman (quarterback), Steed (left halfback), Prendergast (right halfback), Bidez (fullback).

=== Clemson ===
Clemson was defeated 14–0.

=== Mississippi A&M ===
Mississippi A&M lost 26–0.

=== Georgia ===
The Georgia Bulldogs fell to Auburn 12–0.

=== Mercer ===
Auburn beat Mercer 45–0, the season's sixth straight shutout.

=== Vanderbilt ===
Vanderbilt at Auburn

	1	2	3	4	Total
• Vanderbilt	0	7	7	3	17
Auburn	0	0	0	0	0

- Date: November 13
- Location: Rickwood Field
  Birmingham, Alabama
- Referee: Bradley Walker

Vanderbilt coach Dan McGugin had been pointing to since before the season. Auburn had dominated Southern football for the past two seasons, without a single team crossing its line.

Vanderbilt jumped out to a 17–0 lead on a rain-soaked field. A Curry pass to captain Russell Cohen opened the scoring. Cody personally took over from that point. In one of the greatest exhibitions of punt covering Cody smothered the receiver every time, recovering two fumbles, one across the goal line for a touchdown. Then, in the last ten seconds of play, Cody dropped kicked a three-pointer from the 33-yard line. Zerfoss and Friel punted splendidly. Curry's generalship was superb, and late in the game the Vandy line rose as one to throw back three Auburn charges on the five-yard line.

The starting lineup : Taylor (left end), Sample (left tackle), Ducote (left guard), Robinson (center), Frickey (right guard), Wynne (right tackle), Bonner (right end), Steed (quarterback), Wren (left halfback), Prendergast (right halfback), Bidez (fullback).

=== Georgia Tech ===
Auburn at Georgia Tech

	1	2	3	4	Total
Auburn	0	0	0	0	0
• Ga. Tech	0	7	0	0	7

- Date: November 25
- Location: Grant Field
  Atlanta
- Game attendance: 10,000
- Referee: Innis Brown

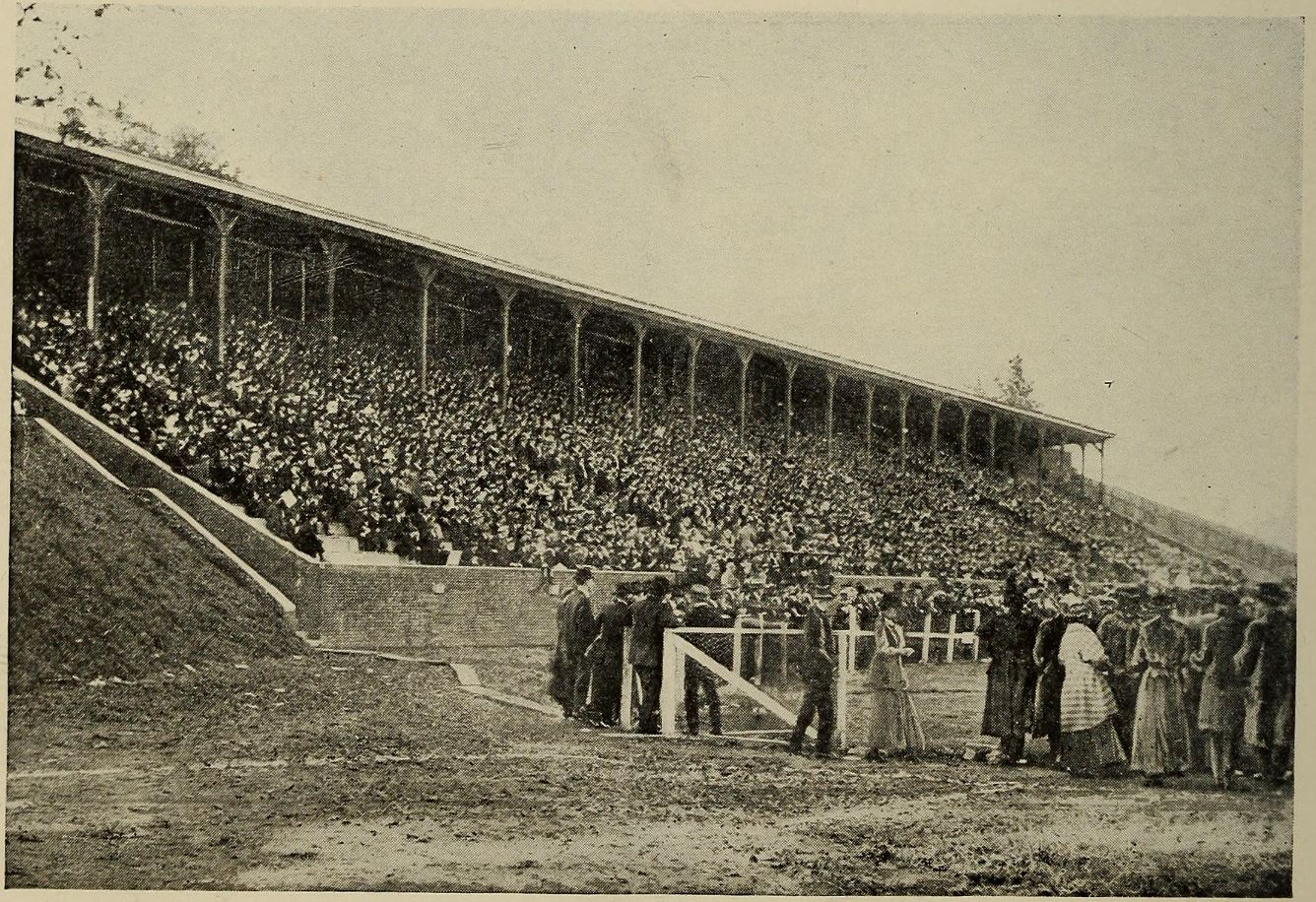
Partial view of the crowd at Grant Field

Georgia Tech closed what was then the greatest season in its history with a 7–0 defeat of Auburn. To begin the second quarter, Everett Strupper had two key plays, the last of which was the game-deciding touchdown. First he made 20 yards around with a pass from Morrison before being forced out of bounds. Next was the 19-yard touchdown. Strupper started around left end, then cut back into the center of the field, away from his blockers. He juked and eluded "every man on the Auburn team." On the last move Strupper faked right and then dove left underneath the outstretched arms of Baby Taylor into the endzone.

The starting lineup against Auburn: Taylor (left end), Wynne (left tackle), Campbell (left guard), Robinson (center), Frickey (right guard), Sample (right tackle), Bonner (right end), Caughman (quarter), Ducote (left halfback), Prendergast (right halfback), Steed (fullback).

== Postseason ==
Guard Baby Taylor was a unanimous All-Southern selection, and was selected third-team All-America by Walter Camp.

== Bibliography ==
- Traughber, Bill (2011). Vanderbilt Football: Tales of Commodore Gridiron History. The History Press. ISBN 978-1-60949-423-0.
