= John G. Henderson =

American college football player, college baseball coach (1892–1939)

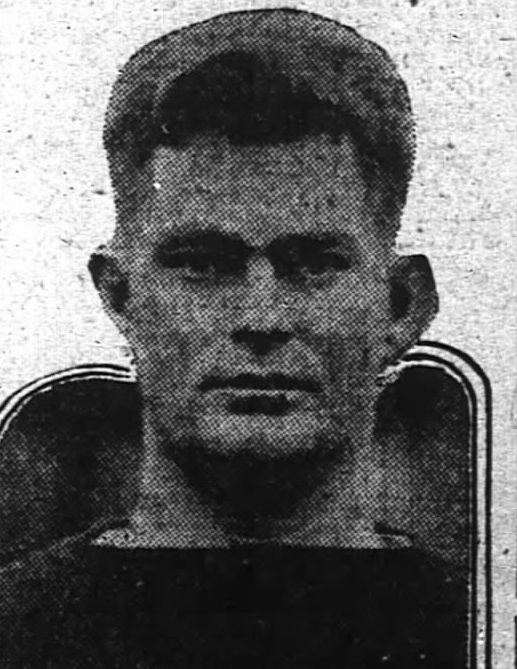
- Henderson, c. 1915

Biographical details
- Born: July 23, 1892; Ocilla, Georgia, U.S.
- Died: September 5, 1939 (aged 47); Valdosta, Georgia, U.S.

Playing career

Football
- 1912–1915: Georgia
- Positions: Tackle, center

Coaching career (HC unless noted)

Football
- 1917: Georgia

Accomplishments and honors

Championships
- SIAA (1917)

Awards
- All-Southern (football) (1912, 1913, 1915)

John Green "Tiny" Henderson (July 23, 1892 – September 5, 1939) was an American college football player and college baseball coach. He was from Ocilla, Georgia.

== College football ==
Henderson was a lineman for the Georgia Bulldogs of the University of Georgia from 1912 to 1915. He weighed 210 pounds.

=== 1913 ===
In 1913 Henderson outweighed the second-heaviest Georgia projected starter by 20 pounds.

=== 1914 ===
In 1914, he was "regarded as one of the best line men in the entire south" and worked "as fast with his head as with his feet." Henderson kicked the winning point to defeat Sewanee, giving the school its first loss at home since 1893. He passed the ball to All-American quarterback David Paddock.

=== 1915 ===
Henderson was captain of the 1915 team. Henderson was elected All-Southern. Henderson once was the head of a group of three men, one behind the other with his hands upon the shoulders of the one in front, to counter Georgia Tech's jump shift offense utilized by John Heisman. The game ended 0–0.

== Baseball ==
Henderson led Georgia baseball in 1917.

== Death ==
Henderson died in Valdosta, Georgia on September 5, 1939, at the age of 47.
