= C. J. McCoy =

American college football and basketball coach

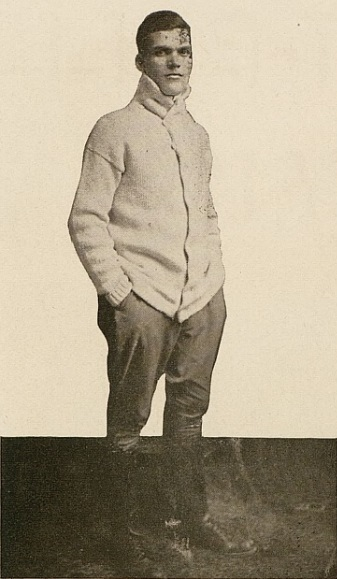

Playing career

Football
- 1907–1910: Miami (OH)

Coaching career (HC unless noted)

Football
- 1914–1916: Florida
- 1916–1917: Ohio Wesleyan

Basketball
- 1915–1916: Florida

Head coaching record
- Overall: 13–13–1 (football); 5–1 (basketball)

Charles James McCoy was an American college football and basketball coach. McCoy was the third head coach of the Florida Gators football team and the first head coach of the Florida Gators men's basketball team that represent the University of Florida in Gainesville, Florida.

== Early life ==
McCoy attended Miami University in Oxford, Ohio, where he played for the Miami Redskins football team from 1907 to 1910. He was a member of the 1908 Redskins team that outscored its opponents 113–10 while posting a 7–0 record, and was later the captain of the 1910 team during his senior year. McCoy also played baseball and basketball and ran track for Miami.

== Coaching career ==
McCoy got his start as a football coach at the Sewanee Military Academy, a preparatory school affiliated with the University of the South in Sewanee, Tennessee. McCoy replaced George E. Pyle as the Florida Gators football coach and held that position for three seasons from 1914 to 1916, and compiled a 9–10 record at Florida. He also served as Florida's first basketball coach during the 1915–1916 season and accumulated a 5–1 record. As measured by his winning percentage (.833), McCoy remains the winningest coach in Gators basketball history. Florida did not field a basketball team for the 1916–1917 season.

After a winless 0–5 football season in 1916, McCoy was replaced as football coach by Alfred L. Buser.

McCoy served as the head coach at Ohio Wesleyan University in 1917.

== Head coaching record ==
=== Football ===
Year	Team	Overall	Conference	Standing	Bowl/playoffs
Florida Gators (Southern Intercollegiate Athletic Association) (1914–1916)
1914	Florida	5–2	2–2		
1915	Florida	4–3	2–3		
1916	Florida	0–5	0–4		
Florida:		9–10	4–9		
Ohio Wesleyan (Ohio Athletic Conference) (1917)
1917	Ohio Wesleyan	4–3–1	3–3–1	T–6th	
Ohio Wesleyan:		4–3–1	3–3–1		
Total:		13–13–1			

=== Basketball ===
Record table
Season	Team	Overall	Conference	Standing	Postseason
Florida Gators (Independent) (1915–1916)
1915–16	Florida	5–1			
Florida:		5–1			
Total:		5–1			

== See also ==
- List of Miami University people
