= 1915 Tulane Olive and Blue football team =

American college football season

1915 Tulane Olive and Blue football
- Conference: Southern Intercollegiate Athletic Association
- Record: 4–4 (1–4 SIAA)
- Head coach: Clark Shaughnessy (1st season)
- Offensive scheme: Single-wing
- Captain: Pete Mailhes
- Home stadium: First Tulane Stadium

1915 Southern Intercollegiate Athletic Association football standings
	Conf.					Overall
Team	W		L		T	W		L		T
Vanderbilt $	5	–	0	–	0	9	–	1	–	0
Alabama	5	–	0	–	0	6	–	2	–	0
LSU	4	–	0	–	0	6	–	2	–	0
Transylvania	3	–	0	–	1	7	–	1	–	1
Auburn	5	–	1	–	0	6	–	2	–	0
Georgia	3	–	1	–	1	5	–	2	–	2
Chattanooga	3	–	1	–	2	5	–	2	–	2
Mississippi A&M	4	–	2	–	1	5	–	2	–	1
Kentucky	2	–	1	–	1	6	–	1	–	1
Florida	3	–	3	–	0	4	–	3	–	0
Clemson	2	–	2	–	1	2	–	4	–	2
South Carolina	1	–	1	–	1	5	–	3	–	1
Furman	1	–	1	–	0	5	–	3	–	0
Mercer	2	–	3	–	0	5	–	4	–	0
Mississippi College	2	–	3	–	0	4	–	4	–	1
The Citadel	1	–	2	–	0	5	–	3	–	0
Sewanee	1	–	2	–	2	4	–	3	–	2
Tennessee	1	–	4	–	0	4	–	4	–	0
Tulane	1	–	4	–	0	4	–	4	–	0
Central University	0	–	3	–	1	3	–	5	–	1
Louisville	0	–	3	–	1	1	–	5	–	1
Howard (AL)	0	–	3	–	0	3	–	4	–	1
Wofford	0	–	3	–	0	3	–	5	–	0
Ole Miss	0	–	5	–	0	2	–	6	–	0
$ – Conference champion

The 1915 Tulane Olive and Blue football team was an American football team that represented Tulane University as a member of the Southern Intercollegiate Athletic Association (SIAA) during the 1915 college football season. In its first year under head coach Clark Shaughnessy, Tulane compiled a 4–4 record (1–4 in conference games), tied for 18th place in the SIAA, and outscored opponents by a total of 118 to 78.

== Schedule ==
Date	Opponent	Site	Result	Source
September 25	at St. Paul's School*	St. Paul's Stadium; Covington, LA	W 24–0	
October 9	Southwestern Industrial*	Tulane Stadium; New Orleans, LA	W 13–0	
October 16	Spring Hill*	Tulane Stadium; New Orleans, LA	W 36–13	
October 23	at Alabama	University Field; Tuscaloosa, AL	L 0–16	
October 30	Mississippi College	Tulane Stadium; New Orleans, LA	L 6–20	
November 13	Howard (AL)	Tulane Stadium; New Orleans, LA	W 32–3	
November 18	at Florida	Fleming Field; Gainesville, FL	L 7–14	
November 25	at LSU	State Field; Baton Rouge, LA (Battle for the Rag)	L 0–12	
*Non-conference game
