= Airey (surname) =

Airey is a surname, and may refer to:

- Bill Airey (1897–1968), New Zealand historian and peace activist
- Carl Airey (born 1965), English footballer
- Dawn Airey (born 1960), British television executive
- Deidre Airey (1926–2002), ceramic artist from New Zealand
- Diana Neave, Baroness Airey of Abingdon (1919–1992), British life peer, widow of Airey Neave
- Diane Airey (born 1943), Australian politician
- Donald Hylton Airey (1920–1942), Australian private who was killed in the Ration Truck massacre
- Don Airey (born 1948), English musician
- Edwin Airey (1878–1955), British civil engineer and industrialist
- Frank Airey (1887–?), English footballer
- George Airey (1761–1833), English general
- George Airey Kirkpatrick (1841–1899), politician from Ontario
- Harriett Airey, pen name of Mary Darwall (1738–1825)
- Henry Parke Airey (1842–1911), Australian colonial soldier
- James Talbot Airey (1812–1898), British Army officer
- Jim Airey (born 1941), Australian motorcycle speedway rider
- Joan Airey (1926–1994), British artistic gymnast
- Joe Airey (1894–1976), British telecommunications engineer
- John Airey (c.1811–1893), politician in colonial Australia, member of the New South Wales Legislative Council
- John Robinson Airey (1868–1937), British schoolteacher, mathematician and astrophysicist
- Josephine Airey (1844–1899), Irish-born American prostitute and madam
- Josie Airey (1932–2002), Irish legal-aid campaigner
- Lawrence Airey (1926–2001), British civil servant
- Paul W. Airey (1923–2009), an adviser to the American Secretary of the Air Force
- Peter Airey (1865–1950), Australian legislator and writer
- Phil Airey (born 1991), English footballer
- Richard Airey, 1st Baron Airey (1803–1881), British Army general
- Robert Airey (1874–1933), English cricketer and army officer
- Stuart Airey (bowls) (born 1971), English lawn bowler
- Stuart Airey (cricketer) (born 1983), English cricketer
- Terence Airey (1900–1983), British Army officer
- Wilfrid Airey (1907–1980), New Zealand cricketer

== See also ==
- Airy (surname)
