= 1919 VPI Gobblers football team =

American college football season

1919 VPI Gobblers football
- Conference: South Atlantic Intercollegiate Athletic Association
- Record: 5–4 (2–4 SAIAA)
- Head coach: Charles Bernier (3rd season)
- Captains: James Thomas Hardwick; Henry Redd
- Home stadium: Miles Field

1919 South Atlantic Intercollegiate Athletic Association football standings
	Conf.					Overall
Team	W		L		T	W		L		T
Georgetown $	2	–	0	–	0	7	–	3	–	0
Maryland State	4	–	1	–	0	5	–	4	–	0
NC State	3	–	1	–	0	7	–	2	–	0
North Carolina	3	–	1	–	0	4	–	3	–	1
Washington and Lee	2	–	1	–	0	8	–	1	–	0
VMI	4	–	2	–	0	6	–	2	–	0
Richmond	2	–	2	–	1	5	–	2	–	2
Virginia	1	–	1	–	1	2	–	5	–	2
VPI	2	–	4	–	0	5	–	4	–	0
William & Mary	1	–	3	–	0	2	–	6	–	1
Catholic University	0	–	1	–	0	1	–	6	–	1
St. John's (MD)	0	–	1	–	0	0	–	1	–	0
Johns Hopkins	0	–	1	–	0	0	–	2	–	0
Davidson	0	–	4	–	0	4	–	6	–	1
$ – Conference champion

The 1919 VPI Gobblers football team represented Virginia Polytechnic Institute in the 1919 college football season. The team was led by their head coach Charles Bernier and finished with a record of five wins and four losses (5–4).

== Schedule ==
Date	Time	Opponent	Site	Result	Attendance	Source
October 4		Hampden–Sydney*	Miles Field; Blacksburg, VA	W 13–0		
October 11		Richmond	Miles Field; Blacksburg, VA	W 21–0		
October 18		at Georgetown	Georgetown Field; Washington, DC	L 7–33		
October 25		vs. Maryland State	Union League Park; Washington, DC	W 6–0		
November 1		vs. Washington and Lee	Lynchburg, VA	L 0–3	4,000-5,000	
November 8		Wake Forest*	Miles Field; Blacksburg, VA	W 40–0		
November 15	3:00 p.m.	vs. NC State	League Park; Norfolk, VA	L 0–3	4,000-4,500	
November 22		Emory and Henry*	Miles Field; Blacksburg, VA	W 99–0		
November 27	3:00 p.m.	vs. VMI	Fair Grounds; Roanoke, VA (rivalry)	L 0–13	6,584	
*Non-conference game; All times are in Eastern time

== Before the season ==
The 1918 VPI Gobblers football team compiled a 7–0 record and were led by Charles A. Bernier in his second season as head coach.

== Game summaries ==
=== Hampden–Sydney ===
Team	1	2	3	4	Total
HS	0	0	0	0	0
• VPI	0	0	0	13	13

- Date: October 4
- Location: Miles Field
  Blacksburg, VA
- Referee: Ernest Sampson (St. Albans)

VPI's first game of the season was a victory over Hampden–Sydney at Miles Field.

The starting lineup for VPI was: J. Hardwick (left end), Hall (left tackle), Armstrong (left guard), Parrish (center), Shaner (right guard), Tilson (right tackle), Davis (right end), Crisp (quarterback), Graham (left halfback), Godsey (right halfback), Redd (fullback). The substitutes were: Brooks, Farmer, H. Hardwick, Kornegay, Lancaster, McCann, Pierce and Rice.

The starting lineup for Hampden–Sydney was: Maurice Lancaster (left end), J. A. Martin (left tackle), J. W. Hogshead (left guard), F. Hogshead (center), Philip Adams (right guard), Ernest Herzig (right tackle), Robert Warren (right end), J. A. Jones (quarterback), B. H. Smith (left halfback), Hill (right halfback), T. K. Menefee (fullback). The substitutes were: W. O. Day, George Lyle, A. C. Paulett and W. B. Rogan.

=== Richmond ===
Team	1	2	3	4	Total
RU	0	0	0	0	0
• VPI	0	0	0	21	21

- Date: October 11
- Location: Miles Field
  Blacksburg, VA
- Referee: Hampton (St. Albans)

After their victory over Hampden–Sydney, VPI played Richmond College at Miles Field.

The starting lineup for VPI was: J. Hardwick (left end), Hall (left tackle), Armstrong (left guard), Parrish (center), Shaner (right guard), Tilson (right tackle), Washington (right end), Crisp (quarterback), Graham (left halfback), Godsey (right halfback), Lancaster (fullback). The substitutes were: Brooks, Davis, Farmer, H. Hardwick, Hutcheson, Kornegay, McCann, Pierce, Rice and Shepherd.

The starting lineup for Richmond was: W. Richard Broaddus (left end), Harry Carter (left tackle), Claiborne Thompson (left guard), Gates Kidd (center), Robert Price (right guard), Albert Klevesahl (right tackle), Hubel Robins (right end), Waverly Jones (quarterback), E. Hobson Snead (left halfback), Alexander Blankingship (right halfback), James Lane (fullback). The substitutes were: Clyde Shepherd, Thurman Towill and William Ziegler.

=== Georgetown ===
Team	1	2	3	4	Total
VPI	0	0	0	7	7
• GU	13	7	0	13	33

- Date: October 18
- Location: Georgetown Field
  Washington, DC
- Referee: Battersby (Swarthmore)

The starting lineup for VPI was: J. Hardwick (left end), Hall (left tackle), Armstrong (left guard), H. Hardwick (center), Shaner (right guard), Tilson (right tackle), Davis (right end), Crisp (quarterback), Graham (left halfback), Godsey (right halfback), Redd (fullback). The substitutes were: Brooks, Farmer, Kornegay, Lancaster, Pierce, Rice and Shepherd.

The starting lineup for Georgetown was: Harry Sullivan (left end), Dan Ahern (left tackle), William Dudack (left guard), Carl Wirts (center), Thomas Sullivan (right guard), Metzger Smeach (right tackle), William C. Kenyon (right end), Jackie Maloney (quarterback), Joseph Leighty (left halfback), Johnny McQuade (right halfback), Harold Livers (fullback). The substitutes were: Alec Anderson, Frank Buckley, Rudy Comstock, Davis, Paul Etzel, Farrell, William Gargan, Jack Haley, Al Leary, Thomas Lonergan, William Moran, Joseph O'Connell, John Sullivan, James Sweeney, John Thornton, Spencer Wise and Andy Zazelli.

=== Maryland State ===
Team	1	2	3	4	Total
• VPI	0	0	0	6	6
MSC	0	0	0	0	0

- Date: October 25
- Location: Union League Park
  Washington, DC
- Referee: Morse (Clarkson Tech)

The starting lineup for VPI was: J. Hardwick (left end), Pierce (left tackle), Armstrong (left guard), H. Hardwick (center), Shaner (right guard), Crisp (right tackle), McConkey (right end), Lancaster (quarterback), Graham (left halfback), McCann (right halfback), Redd (fullback). The substitutes were: Chapman, Farmer, Kornegay and Tilson.

The starting lineup for Maryland State was: Geary Eppley (left end), Andy Nisbet (left tackle), Sam Edel (left guard), Dutch Myers (center), Jerry Sullivan (right guard), Roy Mackert (right tackle), M. Talbot Riggs (right end), Ray Knode (quarterback), Lester Bosley (left halfback), W. L. Barall (right halfback), Alexander McDonald (fullback). The substitutes were: Caleb Bailey, Herbert Gilbert, John Groves, John Moore and Romeo Pagnucci.

=== Washington and Lee ===
Team	1	2	3	4	Total
• W&L	0	0	0	3	3
VPI	0	0	0	0	0

- Date: November 1
- Location: Lynchburg, VA
- Game attendance: 4,000-5,000
- Referee: Paul Magoffin

The starting lineup for VPI was: J. Hardwick (left end), Hall (left tackle), Armstrong (left guard), H. Hardwick (center), Shaner (right guard), Crisp (right tackle), Parrish (right end), Lancaster (quarterback), Graham (left halfback), Godsey (right halfback), Redd (fullback). The substitutes were: Chapman, McCann, Pierce, Tilson and Washington.

The starting lineup for Washington and Lee was: O. R. Daves (left end), Lindsay Moore (left tackle), Richard Sanford (left guard), F. M. Paget (center), Edward Bailey (right guard), Turner Bethel (right tackle), John Corbett (right end), Marcus Cogbill (quarterback), Joseph Silverstein (left halfback), Samuel Raines (right halfback), J. W. McDonald (fullback). The substitutes were: Barrow, Cobb, Lewis Collins, Matson, Jim Mattox, and Marv Mattox.

=== Wake Forest ===
Team	1	2	3	4	Total
WF	0	0	0	0	0
• VPI	13	7	13	7	40

- Date: November 8
- Location: Miles Field
  Blacksburg, VA
- Referee: Ernest Sampson (St. Albans)

The starting lineup for VPI was: J. Hardwick (left end), Hall (left tackle), Armstrong (left guard), H. Hardwick (center), Shaner (right guard), Pierce (right tackle), McCann (right end), Crisp (quarterback), Graham (left halfback), Lancaster (right halfback), Redd (fullback). The substitutes were: Brooks, Farmer, Kornegay, Parrish and Tilson.

The starting lineup for Wake Forest was: C. B. Johnston (left end), Pierce (left tackle), Tom Moss (left guard), Wall (center), Forrest Feezor (right guard), Hubert Olive (right tackle), Heckman (right end), Jennette (quarterback), John Boylin (left halfback), Fitzhugh Fulton (right halfback), Harry Rabenhorst (fullback). The substitutes were: Benton, Bundy, John Floyd, Moore, Shaw Pruette and James Taylor.

=== NC State ===
Team	1	2	3	4	Total
VPI	0	0	0	0	0
• NCSU	0	0	0	3	3

- Date: November 15
- Location: League Park
  Norfolk, VA
- Game attendance: 4,000-4,500
- Referee: Battersby (Swarthmore)

The starting lineup for VPI was: J. Hardwick (left end), Hall (left tackle), Armstrong (left guard), H. Hardwick (center), Shaner (right guard), Pierce (right tackle), Washington (right end), Crisp (quarterback), Graham (left halfback), Lancaster (right halfback), Redd (fullback). The substitutes were: Brooks, Copenhaver, Godsey, Parrish and Tilson.

The starting lineup for NC State was: Solomon Homewood (left end), Herbert Weathers (left tackle), Robert Young (left guard), William Whitaker (center), Averette Floyd (right guard), John Ripple (right tackle), Charles Kirkpatrick (right end), John Faucette (quarterback), Dick Gurley (left halfback), Nathaniel Pierson (right halfback), George Murray (fullback). The substitutes were: Joel Lawrence.

=== Emory and Henry ===
Team	1	2	3	4	Total
EH	0	0	0	0	0
• VPI	6	32	26	35	99

- Date: November 22
- Location: Miles Field
  Blacksburg, VA
- Referee: Ernest Sampson (St. Albans)

The starting lineup for VPI was: Chapman (left end), Farmer (left tackle), Sherertz (left guard), Shaner (center), Saunders (right guard), McConkey (right tackle), Washington (right end), McCann (quarterback), Walters (left halfback), Brooks (right halfback), Glaze (fullback). The substitutes were: Crisp, Gay, Graham, Lancaster, Newman, Redd, Rice and Wills.

The starting lineup for Emory and Henry was: Sutherland (left end), Wolfe (left tackle), Carter (left guard), J. E. Anderson (center), Jim Weaver (right guard), Lotspeich (right tackle), Dyer (right end), Kelly (quarterback), R. B. Terry (left halfback), Graham (right halfback), Perry (fullback). The substitutes were: Jones.

=== VMI ===
Team	1	2	3	4	Total
VPI	0	0	0	0	0
• VMI	7	0	0	6	13

- Date: November 27
- Location: Fair Grounds
  Roanoke, VA
- Game start: 3:00 p.m.
- Game attendance: 6,584
- Referee: Langford (Trinity)

The starting lineup for VPI was: Camper (left end), Hall (left tackle), Armstrong (left guard), H. Hardwick (center), J. Hardwick (right guard), Pierce (right tackle), Parrish (right end), Crisp (quarterback), Redd (left halfback), Lancaster (right halfback), McCann (fullback). The substitutes were: Brooks, Farmer, Godsey, Graham, Shaner and Tilson.

The starting lineup for VMI was: Howard Hawkins (left end), Frank Summers (left tackle), Howard Shipley (left guard), J. T. Smith (center), Mantor (right guard), Robert Hunt (right tackle), Sam Mason (right end), Walker Stuart (quarterback), Jere Bunting (left halfback), Jimmy Leech (right halfback), Richard Dickson (fullback). The substitutes were: Bertram Bacharach, William Drewry, Fix, William Harrison, Hubert McCuistion and William Wilson.

== After the season ==
In December 1919, the VPI players elected Henry Redd as captain of the 1920 VPI Gobblers football team.

== Players ==
=== Roster ===
VPI 1919 roster
Quarterback: Hank Crisp; Guards: "Dustie" Armstrong; Wally Shaner; Tackles: "Polly" Hall; Walter Pierce; Sumner D. Tilson; Centers: Harry Judson Hardwick; Ends: Davis; Jim Hardwick (Capt.); George Parrish; Washington	Halfbacks: J. R. Graham; Robert Godsey; George Lancaster; Fullback: Henry Redd (Capt.); Substitutes: Philip Clay Brooks; Julian Jessings Camper; Chapman; John Copenhaver; Farmer; Gay; Glenn Vernon Glaze; Hutcheson; John Keatts Kornegay; Harry McCann	Samuel Anderson McConkey; Newman; Guy Eldridge Rice; Robert M. Saunders; Shepherd; William Shields Sherertz; Walters; Clarke Willey; Allan Wills

=== Monogram Club members ===
Sixteen players received monograms for their participation on the 1919 VPI team.

Player	Hometown	Notes
A. B. "Dustie" Armstrong		
John Kelly Copenhaver	Seven Mile Ford, Virginia	World War I and World War II veteran (Lieutenant Colonel, Army Corps of Engineers).
Hank Crisp	Falkland, North Carolina	
Robert Drew Godsey	Bristol, Virginia	
J. R. Graham		
Lysle Gregory "Polly" Hall		
Harry Judson Hardwick	Blacksburg, Virginia	22nd head football coach at the United States Naval Academy in Annapolis, Maryland, serving for two seasons, from 1937 to 1938, and compiling a record of 8–7–3.
James Thomas Hardwick, Jr.	Blacksburg, Virginia	
George Douglas Lancaster	Hanover, Virginia	World War I and World War II veteran (Lieutenant Colonel, Air Force).
Harry Lee McCann		
George F. Parrish	Bristol, Virginia	Elected to the West Virginia House of Delegates in 1934. Inducted into the Virginia Tech Sports Hall of Fame in 1986.
Walter Morgan Pierce	Christiansburg, Virginia	
Henry Redd	Martinsville, Virginia	World War I veteran (First Lieutenant, Army). VPI Head football coach from 1932 to 1940.
Wally Shaner	Lynchburg, Virginia	Reserve outfielder in Major League Baseball, playing mainly at left field for three different teams between the 1923 and 1929 seasons.
Sumner Dewey "Tex" Tilson	Childress, Texas	VPI's head football coach for one season, in 1942, compiling a record of 7–2–1.
Clarke Randolph Willey	Winchester, Virginia	

== Coaching and training staff ==
- Head coach: Charles A. Bernier
- Graduate Manager: Sally Miles
- Trainer: Doc Tyler
- Manager: Edward Purcifull Yeager
