= General Airey =

General Airey may refer to:

- George Airey (1761–1833), British Army lieutenant general
- James Talbot Airey (1812–1898), British Army general
- Terence Airey (1900–1983), British Army lieutenant general
- Richard Airey, 1st Baron Airey (1803–1881), British Army general

== See also ==
- Christopher Airy (born 1934), British Army major general
- Ved Prakash Airy (1935–2007), Indian Army lieutenant general
