= Airy =

Airy may refer to:

- Airy (surname)
- Airy (lunar crater)
- Airy (Martian crater)
- Airy-0, a smaller crater within the previous one on Mars, and which defines the prime meridian of the planet
- Airy wave theory, a linear theory describing the propagation of "gravity waves" on the surface of a fluid
- Airy disk, a diffraction pattern in optics
- Airy beam, a non-spreading, transversely accelerating optical wavepacket
- Airy function, a mathematical function
- Airy points, support points chosen to minimize the distortion of the length of a physical standard (such as the International Prototype Meter)
- Airy, a character in the video game Bravely Default
- Airy (musician), South Korean indie pop musician

== See also ==
- Airey (disambiguation)
- Mount Airy (disambiguation)
- Aerie (disambiguation)
