= 1919 Washington and Lee Generals football team =

American college football season

1919 Washington and Lee Generals football
- Conference: South Atlantic Intercollegiate Athletic Association
- Record: 8–1 (2–1 SAIAA)
- Head coach: W. C. Raftery (2nd season)
- Captain: Turner Bethel
- Home stadium: Wilson Field

1919 South Atlantic Intercollegiate Athletic Association football standings
	Conf.					Overall
Team	W		L		T	W		L		T
Georgetown $	2	–	0	–	0	7	–	3	–	0
Maryland State	4	–	1	–	0	5	–	4	–	0
NC State	3	–	1	–	0	7	–	2	–	0
North Carolina	3	–	1	–	0	4	–	3	–	1
Washington and Lee	2	–	1	–	0	8	–	1	–	0
VMI	4	–	2	–	0	6	–	2	–	0
Richmond	2	–	2	–	1	5	–	2	–	2
Virginia	1	–	1	–	1	2	–	5	–	2
VPI	2	–	4	–	0	5	–	4	–	0
William & Mary	1	–	3	–	0	2	–	6	–	1
Catholic University	0	–	1	–	0	1	–	6	–	1
St. John's (MD)	0	–	1	–	0	0	–	1	–	0
Johns Hopkins	0	–	1	–	0	0	–	2	–	0
Davidson	0	–	4	–	0	4	–	6	–	1
$ – Conference champion

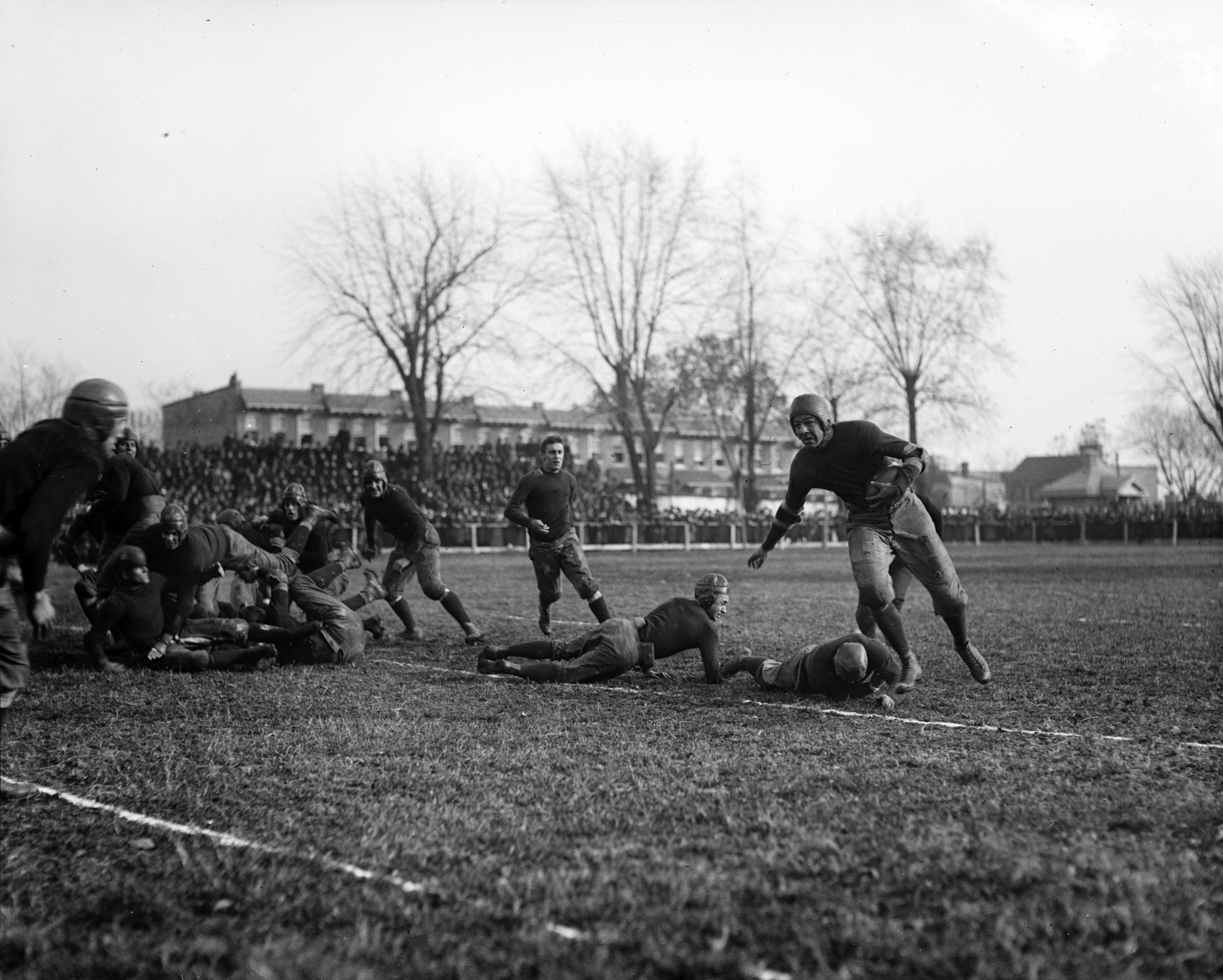
Georgetown University football plays Washington and Lee University football on November 22, 1919 at Georgetown Field

The 1919 Washington and Lee Generals football team represented Washington and Lee University during the 1919 college football season. The Generals competed in the South Atlantic Intercollegiate Athletic Association (SAIAA) and were coached by W. C. Raftery in his third year as head coach, compiling an 8–1 record (2–1 SAIAA). In captain Turner Bethel's final game, a win over Tulane, he "covered himself with glory as well as mud." Quarterback Jim Mattox made the field goal to upset Georgia Tech.

Fuzzy Woodruff gave W&L the championship of the South for 1919.

== Schedule ==
Date	Opponent	Site	Result	Source
October 4	Randolph–Macon*	Wilson Field; Lexington, VA	W 21–0	
October 11	Davidson	Wilson Field; Lexington, VA	W 7–0	
October 18	Norfolk Navy Base*	Wilson Field; Lexington, VA	W 78–0	
October 25	Roanoke*	Wilson Field; Lexington, VA	W 32–0	
November 1	vs. VPI	Fair Grounds; Lynchburg, VA	W 3–0	
November 8	at Georgia Tech*	Grant Field; Atlanta, GA	W 3–0	
November 15	South Carolina*	Wilson Field; Lexington, VA	W 26–0	
November 22	at Georgetown	Georgetown Field; Washington, DC	L 6–27	
November 27	at Tulane*	Tulane Stadium; New Orleans, LA	W 7–0	
*Non-conference game

== Players ==
=== Line ===
Player	Position	Games started	Hometown	Prep school	Height	Weight	Age
Ed Bailey	guard						
Turner Bethel	tackle		Goochland, Virginia				
Pat Collins	center/tackle						
Jack Corbett	end						
Oliver Daves	end		Fayetteville, Tennessee				
Marv Mattox	end		Leesville, Virginia		5'9"	170	
L. L. Moore
Frank Paget	center						
Paul Sanford	guard						

=== Backfield ===
Player	Position	Games started	Hometown	Prep school	Height	Weight	Age
Mac Cogbill	quarterback						
Jim Mattox	quarterback		Leesville, Virginia		5'9"	168	
J. W. McDonald	fullback						
Sam Raines	halfback						
Stevenson	halfback						
Joe Silverstein	fullback						

=== Subs ===
Player	Position	Games started	Hometown	Prep school	Height	Weight	Age
Cobb	halfback						

== Coaching staff ==
- Head coach: W. C. Raftery
- Assistant coach: Ted Shultz
