= Airey =

Airey may refer to:

== People ==
- Airey (surname)
- Airey Neave (1916–1979), a British politician

== Places ==
- Airey, Maryland, a populated place in Dorchester County, Maryland, U.S.
- Aireys Inlet, Victoria, a small coastal inlet and town in Victoria, Australia

== Other uses ==
- Airey, a colloquial term for area or areaway

== See also ==
- Airy (disambiguation)
- Area, in architecture
- Aerie, an eagle's, hawk's, or falcon's nest
- Mount Airy (disambiguation)
