= 1919 Georgetown Blue and Gray football team =

American college football season

1919 Georgetown Blue and Gray football

SAIAA champion
- Conference: South Atlantic Intercollegiate Athletic Association
- Record: 7–3 (2–0 SAIAA)
- Head coach: Albert Exendine (6th season)
- Captain: Johnny McQuade
- Home stadium: Georgetown Field

1919 South Atlantic Intercollegiate Athletic Association football standings
	Conf.					Overall
Team	W		L		T	W		L		T
Georgetown $	2	–	0	–	0	7	–	3	–	0
Maryland State	4	–	1	–	0	5	–	4	–	0
NC State	3	–	1	–	0	7	–	2	–	0
North Carolina	3	–	1	–	0	4	–	3	–	1
Washington and Lee	2	–	1	–	0	8	–	1	–	0
VMI	4	–	2	–	0	6	–	2	–	0
Richmond	2	–	2	–	1	5	–	2	–	2
Virginia	1	–	1	–	1	2	–	5	–	2
VPI	2	–	4	–	0	5	–	4	–	0
William & Mary	1	–	3	–	0	2	–	6	–	1
Catholic University	0	–	1	–	0	1	–	6	–	1
St. John's (MD)	0	–	1	–	0	0	–	1	–	0
Johns Hopkins	0	–	1	–	0	0	–	2	–	0
Davidson	0	–	4	–	0	4	–	6	–	1
$ – Conference champion

The 1919 Georgetown Blue and Gray football team represented Georgetown University during the 1919 college football season. Led by Albert Exendine in his sixth year as head coach, the team went 7–3 and won a South Atlantic Intercollegiate Athletic Association (SAIAA) championship.

== Schedule ==
Date	Time	Opponent	Site	Result	Attendance	Source
September 27		Norfolk Navy Yard*	Georgetown Field; Washington, DC	W 58–6		
October 4		Norfolk Navy Base*	Georgetown Field; Washington, DC	W 33–0		
October 11		West Virginia Wesleyan*	Georgetown Field; Washington, DC	W 26–0		
October 18		VPI	Georgetown Field; Washington, DC	W 33–7		
October 25		at Detroit*	Navin Field; Detroit, MI	L 13–16		
November 1		Delaware*	Georgetown Field; Washington, DC	W 47–7		
November 8		at Navy*	Worden Field; Annapolis, MD	W 6–0	10,000	
November 15		at Georgia Tech*	Grant Field; Atlanta, GA	L 0–27		
November 22		Washington and Lee	Georgetown Field; Washington, DC	W 27–6		
November 29	2:00 p.m.	at Boston College*	Braves Field; Boston, MA	L 9–10		
*Non-conference game; All times are in Eastern time
