= Jim Mattox (baseball) =

American baseball player (1896–1973)

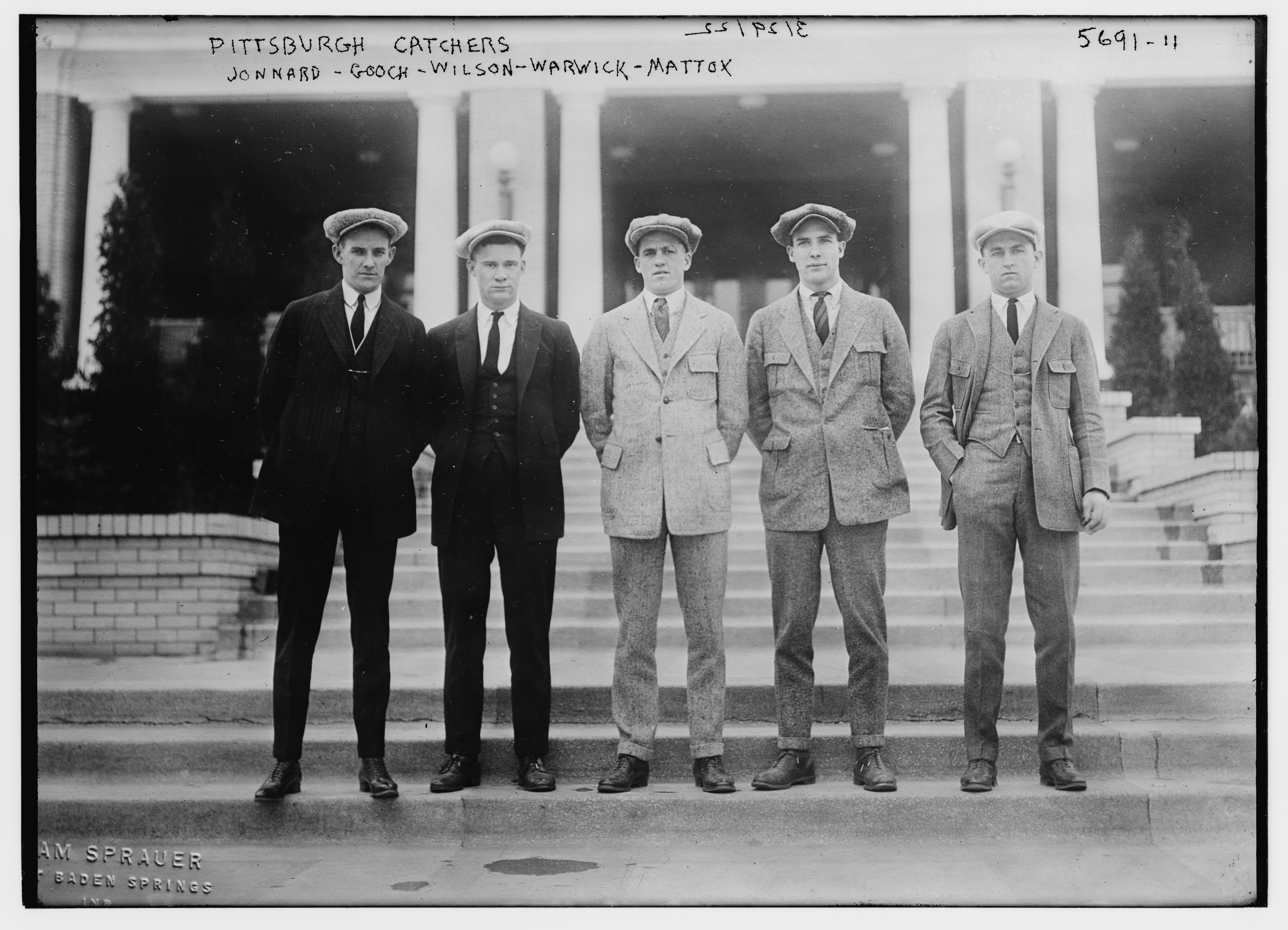
- Catcher/Pinch hitter
- Born: December 17, 1896; Leesville, Virginia, U.S.
- Died: October 12, 1973 (aged 76); Myrtle Beach, South Carolina, U.S.
- Batted: Left Threw: Right

MLB debut
- April 30, 1922, for the Pittsburgh Pirates

Last MLB appearance
- September 30, 1923, for the Pittsburgh Pirates

MLB statistics
- Batting average: .253
- Home runs: 0
- Runs batted in: 4
- Stats at Baseball Reference

Teams
- Pittsburgh Pirates (1922–1923)

James Powell Mattox (December 17, 1896 – October 12, 1973) was an American professional baseball player. He played as a catcher in Major League Baseball for the Pittsburgh Pirates in 1922 and 1923.

== Biography ==
His brother, Cloy Mattox, played in three games for the Philadelphia Athletics in 1929. Another brother, Marv Mattox, was a teammate in college.

James played college football for the Washington and Lee Generals football team of Washington and Lee University. He was selected in 1919 to the College Football All-Southern Team. He made the field goal to upset Georgia Tech.

Mattox was later a catcher for the Pittsburgh Pirates from 1922 to 1923. He was then sold to the Wichita Falls club.
