= Mount Airy, Virginia =

Mount Airy is the name of several places in the Commonwealth of Virginia:

- Mount Airy, Richmond County, Virginia, a mid-Georgian plantation house built for Col. John Tayloe, listed on the National Register of Historic Places (NRHP) in Richmond County and a National Historic Landmark
- Mount Airy (Leesville, Virginia), listed on the NRHP in Bedford County
- Mount Airy (Verona, Virginia), listed on the NRHP in Augusta County
- Mount Airy, Charles City County, Virginia, an unincorporated community
- Mount Airy, Pittsylvania County, Virginia, an unincorporated community
- Mount Airy, Shenandoah County, Virginia, an unincorporated community
