= Mount Airy =

Mount Airy may refer to:

== Places in the United States ==
- Mount Airy, Georgia
- Mount Airy, Louisiana
- Mount Airy, Maryland
  - Mount Airy (Davidsonville, Maryland), listed on the NRHP in Maryland
  - Mount Airy (Sharpsburg, Maryland), listed on the NRHP in Maryland
  - Mount Airy Mansion, in Rosaryville State Park
- Mount Airy, Missouri
- Mount Airy, New Jersey
- Mount Airy, New York, a neighborhood
- Mount Airy (Ulster County, New York), a mountain
- Mount Airy, North Carolina
- Mount Airy, Cincinnati, Ohio, a neighborhood
- Mount Airy, Philadelphia, a neighborhood within the city of Philadelphia, Pennsylvania
  - Mount Airy (SEPTA station), a SEPTA train station in the neighborhood
- Mt. Airy (Cordova, Tennessee), listed on the NRHP in Tennessee
- Mount Airy, Virginia (disambiguation), the name of several places in Virginia
  - Mount Airy (Leesville, Virginia), listed on the NRHP in Virginia
  - Mount Airy, Richmond County, Virginia, listed on the NRHP in Virginia
  - Mount Airy (Verona, Virginia), listed on the NRHP in Virginia
  - Mount Airy (Warsaw, Virginia), listed on the NRHP in Virginia
- Mount Airy Township, Surry County, North Carolina

== Other uses ==
- Mount Airy Casino Resort, in Mount Pocono, Pennsylvania
- Mount Airy Forest, a park in Cincinnati, Ohio
- Mount Airy, a peak in the Shoshone Mountains, Nevada
