= Leeds Central High School =

Former school in Leeds, England

Coordinates: 53.8013°N 1.5455°W

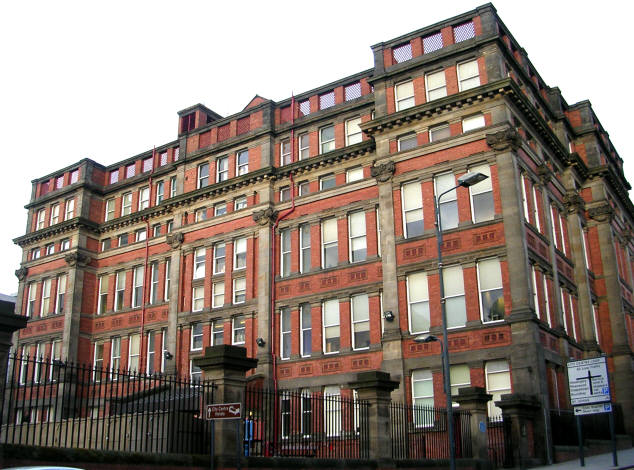
1889 school building, latterly council offices

Leeds Central High School (previously Leeds Central Higher Grade School) was the first local authority secondary school opened by the Leeds School Board, West Yorkshire, England, in 1885 using the school-room attached to Oxford Place Chapel. In 1889 the school moved to a new building (designed by architects Birchall and Kelly. Grade II listed) at the junction of Woodhouse Lane and Great George Street near the centre of Leeds.

In 1972 the school was renamed "City of Leeds School" formerly "Leeds Central High School". It was an all boys school with a curriculum biased towards science and technology. Thoresby High School was a girls' school which occupied an adjacent building.

In 1972 Leeds Central High School and Thoresby High School were merged to form the new City of Leeds School. This school moved to a new site in 1994 at Hyde Park, and the Woodhouse Lane building was adapted for use as Council offices The building is now for sale with planning application for a nightclub

== Alumni ==
- Julius Silverman MP
- John Robinson Airey, mathematician and astrophysicist
- Sir Edwin Airey, a British industrialist responsible for the Airey prefabricated houses
- Bryan Mosley, actor, Coronation Street
- Aaron Lennon, former professional footballer
- Jessie Coulson, dictionary compiler and translator
