= John Airey =

John Airey may refer to:

- John Airey (politician) (c. 1811–1893), English politician
- John Robinson Airey (1868–1937), British schoolteacher, mathematician, and astrophysicist
