= Airy (surname) =

Airy is a surname, and may refer to:

- Anna Airy (1882–1964), British artist
- Christopher Airy (1934–2025), British Army officer
- George Biddell Airy (1801–1892), British Astronomer Royal from 1835 to 1881
- Hubert Airy (1838–1903), English physician, son of George Biddell Airy
- James Airy (1884–1920), British Army officer and cricketer, son of Osmund Airy
- Kashi Singh Airy (born 1953), Indian politician from Uttar Pradesh
- Osmund Airy (1845–1928), English historian
- Ved Prakash Airy (1935–2007), Indian Army officer

== See also ==
- Airey (surname)
