= George Airey =

George Airey may refer to:

- George Airey (British Army officer) (1761–1833), British Army officer
- George Airey Kirkpatrick (1841–1899), Canadian politician
