= James Airey =

James Airey may refer to:

- James Talbot Airey (1812–1898), British Army officer
- Jim Airey (born 1941), Australian motorcycle speedway rider
