= 1919 Davidson Wildcats football team =

American college football season

1919 Davidson Wildcats football
- Conference: South Atlantic Intercollegiate Athletic Association
- Record: 4–6–1 (0–4 SAIAA)
- Head coach: Pete Crayton (1st season)
- Home stadium: Sprunt Field

1919 South Atlantic Intercollegiate Athletic Association football standings
	Conf.					Overall
Team	W		L		T	W		L		T
Georgetown $	2	–	0	–	0	7	–	3	–	0
Maryland State	4	–	1	–	0	5	–	4	–	0
NC State	3	–	1	–	0	7	–	2	–	0
North Carolina	3	–	1	–	0	4	–	3	–	1
Washington and Lee	2	–	1	–	0	8	–	1	–	0
VMI	4	–	2	–	0	6	–	2	–	0
Richmond	2	–	2	–	1	5	–	2	–	2
Virginia	1	–	1	–	1	2	–	5	–	2
VPI	2	–	4	–	0	5	–	4	–	0
William & Mary	1	–	3	–	0	2	–	6	–	1
Catholic University	0	–	1	–	0	1	–	6	–	1
St. John's (MD)	0	–	1	–	0	0	–	1	–	0
Johns Hopkins	0	–	1	–	0	0	–	2	–	0
Davidson	0	–	4	–	0	4	–	6	–	1
$ – Conference champion

The 1919 Davidson Wildcats football team was an American football team that represented the Davidson College as a member of the South Atlantic Intercollegiate Athletic Association (SAIAA) during the 1919 college football season. In their first year under head coach Pete Crayton, the team compiled a 4–6–1 record.

== Schedule ==
Date	Time	Opponent	Site	Result	Attendance	Source
September 20		Guilford*	Sprunt Field; Davidson, NC	W 33–0		
September 26		at Wake Forest*	Wake Forest, NC	W 21–0		
October 3		at Clemson*	Riggs Field; Calhoun, SC	L 0–7		
October 11		at Washington and Lee	Wilson Field; Lexington, VA	L 0–7		
October 18		at South Carolina*	College Park; Columbia, SC	W 7–0		
October 25		vs. VMI	Lynchburg, VA	L 7–14		
November 1		at Georgia Tech*	Grant Field; Atlanta, GA	L 0–33		
November 8		vs. NC State	Wearn Field; Charlotte, NC	L 6–36		
November 15		vs. North Carolina	Prince Albert Park; Winston-Salem, NC	L 0–10	2,000	
November 21		Presbyterian*	Sprunt Field; Davidson, NC	T 0–0		
November 27	3:00 p.m.	at Furman*	Manly Field; Greenville, SC	W 41–14	4,000	
*Non-conference game; All times are in Eastern time
