= Deidre Airey =

New Zealand ceramic artist

Deidre Airey QSM
- Born: Deidre Morag Airey; 9 December 1926; Christchurch, New Zealand
- Died: 16 August 2002 (aged 75)
- Education: University of Otago
- Known for: Ceramic tiles
- Relatives: Bill Airey (father)

Deidre Morag Airey QSM (9 December 1926 – 16 August 2002) was a New Zealand ceramic artist. Her work is held in the collection of the Museum of New Zealand Te Papa Tongarewa.

== Life ==
Airey was born in Christchurch in 1926, to Willis Thomas Goodwin Airey, a university lecturer, and Isobel Lilian Airey (née Chadwick). She attended Epsom Girls’ Grammar School in Auckland, followed by the University of Otago Dunedin School of Medicine. She graduated MB ChB in 1953, and practised medicine in Auckland until settling in the Coromandel in 1960, where she was appointed part-time superintendent of the Coromandel Hospital.

Airey's friend Barry Brickell inspired her to begin working in clay, and she began to experiment with creating relief tiles from local Coromandel clay. The tiles were wood-fired at Driving Creek Pottery, producing interesting variations in colour and glaze, and depicted scriptural scenes from the gospels of the New Testament. Many of her scenes are set in the local landscape.

In the 1979 Queen's Birthday Honours, Airey was awarded the Queen's Service Medal for public services.

Airey died on 16 August 2002, and she was buried at Buffalo Cemetery, Coromandel.

In 2004, a group of Airey's friends mounted an exhibition of Airey's work at Hauraki House in Coromandel. In 2008, her work was exhibited at the Waikato Museum.
