= 1919 Virginia Orange and Blue football team =

American college football season

1919 Virginia Orange and Blue football
- Conference: South Atlantic Intercollegiate Athletic Association
- Record: 2–5–2 (1–1–1 SAIAA)
- Head coach: Harris Coleman (1st season)
- Home stadium: Lambeth Field

1919 South Atlantic Intercollegiate Athletic Association football standings
	Conf.					Overall
Team	W		L		T	W		L		T
Georgetown $	2	–	0	–	0	7	–	3	–	0
Maryland State	4	–	1	–	0	5	–	4	–	0
NC State	3	–	1	–	0	7	–	2	–	0
North Carolina	3	–	1	–	0	4	–	3	–	1
Washington and Lee	2	–	1	–	0	8	–	1	–	0
VMI	4	–	2	–	0	6	–	2	–	0
Richmond	2	–	2	–	1	5	–	2	–	2
Virginia	1	–	1	–	1	2	–	5	–	2
VPI	2	–	4	–	0	5	–	4	–	0
William & Mary	1	–	3	–	0	2	–	6	–	1
Catholic University	0	–	1	–	0	1	–	6	–	1
St. John's (MD)	0	–	1	–	0	0	–	1	–	0
Johns Hopkins	0	–	1	–	0	0	–	2	–	0
Davidson	0	–	4	–	0	4	–	6	–	1
$ – Conference champion

The 1919 Virginia Orange and Blue football team represented the University of Virginia as a member of the South Atlantic Intercollegiate Athletic Association (SAIAA) during the 1919 college football season. Led by Harris Coleman in his first and only season as head coach, the Orange and Blue compiled an overall record of 2–5–2 with a mark of 1–1–1 in conference play, tying for seventh place in the SAIAA.

== Schedule ==
Date	Time	Opponent	Site	Result	Source
September 27		Randolph–Macon*	Lambeth Field; Charlottesville, VA	W 12–2	
October 4		Richmond	Lambeth Field; Charlottesville, VA	T 0–0	
October 11		Maryland State*	Lambeth Field; Charlottesville, VA	L 0–13	
October 18		VMI*	Lambeth Field; Charlottesville, VA	W 7–0	
October 25	3:00 p.m.	at Harvard*	Harvard Stadium; Boston, MA	L 0–47	
November 1		Centre*	Lambeth Field; Charlottesville, VA	L 7–49	
November 8		at Georgia*	Sanford Field; Athens, GA	T 7–7	
November 15		Vanderbilt*	Lambeth Field; Charlottesville, VA	L 6–10	
November 27		at North Carolina	Emerson Field; Chapel Hill, NC (rivalry)	L 0–6	
*Non-conference game; All times are in Eastern time
