= 1919 Maryland State Aggies football team =

American college football season

1919 Maryland State Aggies football

Maryland state champion
- Conference: South Atlantic Intercollegiate Athletic Association
- Record: 5–4 (4–1 SAIAA)
- Head coach: Curley Byrd (9th season)

1919 South Atlantic Intercollegiate Athletic Association football standings
	Conf.					Overall
Team	W		L		T	W		L		T
Georgetown $	2	–	0	–	0	7	–	3	–	0
Maryland State	4	–	1	–	0	5	–	4	–	0
NC State	3	–	1	–	0	7	–	2	–	0
North Carolina	3	–	1	–	0	4	–	3	–	1
Washington and Lee	2	–	1	–	0	8	–	1	–	0
VMI	4	–	2	–	0	6	–	2	–	0
Richmond	2	–	2	–	1	5	–	2	–	2
Virginia	1	–	1	–	1	2	–	5	–	2
VPI	2	–	4	–	0	5	–	4	–	0
William & Mary	1	–	3	–	0	2	–	6	–	1
Catholic University	0	–	1	–	0	1	–	6	–	1
St. John's (MD)	0	–	1	–	0	0	–	1	–	0
Johns Hopkins	0	–	1	–	0	0	–	2	–	0
Davidson	0	–	4	–	0	4	–	6	–	1
$ – Conference champion

The 1919 Maryland State Aggies football team was an American football team that represented Maryland State College (which in 1920 became part of the University of Maryland) in the South Atlantic Intercollegiate Athletic Association (SAIAA) during the 1919 college football season. In their ninth season under head coach Curley Byrd, the Aggies compiled a 5–4 record and outscored their opponents by a total of 93 to 74. In the final game of the season, the Aggies won the Maryland state championship by defeating Johns Hopkins by a 13 to 0 score in Baltimore.

== Schedule ==
Date	Opponent	Site	Result	Attendance	Source
October 4	at Swarthmore*	Swarthmore, PA	L 6–10		
October 11	at Virginia	Lambeth Field; Charlottesville, VA	W 13–0		
October 18	at West Virginia*	Morgantown, WV	L 0–27		
October 25	vs. VPI	Union League Park; Washington, DC	L 0–6		
November 1	at Yale*	Yale Bowl; New Haven, CT	L 0–31		
November 8	at St. John's (MD)	Annapolis, MD	W 27–0		
November 15	at Catholic University	Washington, DC	W 13–0		
November 22	Western Maryland*	College Park, MD	W 20–0		
November 27	at Johns Hopkins	Homewood Field; Baltimore, MD	W 14–0	> 10,000	
*Non-conference game
