= James G. Driver =

American athlete, coach, and administrator (1889–1975)

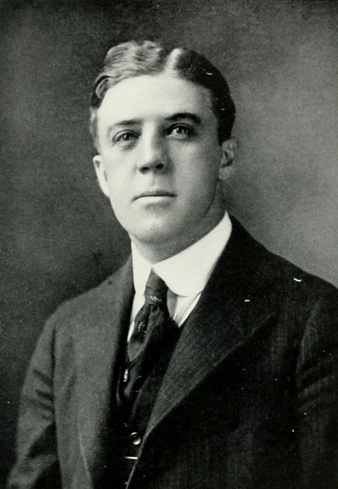
- Driver pictured in The Colonial Echo 1920, William & Mary yearbook

Biographical details
- Born: August 10, 1889; Harrisonburg, Virginia, U.S.
- Died: October 1975 (aged 86); Williamsburg, Virginia, U.S.

Playing career

Football
- 1908–1909: William & Mary
- 1910: Virginia

Basketball
- 1905–1907: William & Mary
- 1908–1910: William & Mary

Coaching career (HC unless noted)

Football
- 1916: Newberry
- 1919–1920: William & Mary

Basketball
- 1911–1913: South Carolina
- 1919–1923: William & Mary

Baseball
- 1912–1913: South Carolina
- 1920–1923: William & Mary

Administrative career (AD unless noted)
- 1919–1923: William & Mary
- 1929–1935: Virginia
- 1935–1937: Virginia (graduate manager)

Head coaching record
- Overall: 11–13–1 (football); 36–24 (basketball); 56–39–1 (baseball)

James Glenn Driver (August 10, 1889 – October 1975) was an American football, basketball, and baseball player, coach, and college athletics administrator. He served as the head football coach at Newberry College in 1916 and at The College of William & Mary from 1919 to 1920, compiling a career college football record of 11–13–1. He was also the head basketball coach at the University of South Carolina from 1911 to 1913 and at William & Mary from 1919 to 1923, amassing a career college basketball record of 36–24. In addition, he was the head baseball coach at South Carolina from 1912 to 1913 and at William & Mary from 1920 to 1923, tallying a career college baseball mark of 56–39–1. Driver served as the athletic director at William & Mary from 1919 to 1923 and at the University of Virginia from 1929 to 1935.

In 1988, Driver was inducted into the Virginia Sports Hall of Fame.

== Coaching career ==
Driver was the head coach for the William & Mary basketball team for the 1919–20 through 1922–23 seasons. During his four years at the helm, he produced a 31–16 record. Driver was also the head coach of the William & Mary football team for two seasons, 1919 and 1920. He compiled a 6–11–1 record during that time.

Prior to William & Mary, Driver was the head coach of the South Carolina Gamecocks men's basketball team from 1911 to 1913. In his only two seasons he compiled a 5–7 record.

== Head coaching record ==
=== Football ===
Year	Team	Overall	Conference	Standing	Bowl/playoffs
Newberry Indians () (1916)
1916	Newberry	5–2			
Newberry:		5–2			
William & Mary Indians (South Atlantic Intercollegiate Athletic Association) (1919–1920)
1919	William & Mary	2–6–1	1–3	10th	
1920	William & Mary	4–5	0–4	14th	
William & Mary:		6–11–1	1–7		
Total:		11–13–1			
