= 1919 North Carolina Tar Heels football team =

American college football season

1919 North Carolina Tar Heels football
- Conference: South Atlantic Intercollegiate Athletic Association
- Record: 4–3–1 (3–1 SAIAA)
- Head coach: Thomas J. Campbell (2nd season)
- Captain: J. M. Coleman
- Home stadium: Emerson Field

1919 South Atlantic Intercollegiate Athletic Association football standings
	Conf.					Overall
Team	W		L		T	W		L		T
Georgetown $	2	–	0	–	0	7	–	3	–	0
Maryland State	4	–	1	–	0	5	–	4	–	0
NC State	3	–	1	–	0	7	–	2	–	0
North Carolina	3	–	1	–	0	4	–	3	–	1
Washington and Lee	2	–	1	–	0	8	–	1	–	0
VMI	4	–	2	–	0	6	–	2	–	0
Richmond	2	–	2	–	1	5	–	2	–	2
Virginia	1	–	1	–	1	2	–	5	–	2
VPI	2	–	4	–	0	5	–	4	–	0
William & Mary	1	–	3	–	0	2	–	6	–	1
Catholic University	0	–	1	–	0	1	–	6	–	1
St. John's (MD)	0	–	1	–	0	0	–	1	–	0
Johns Hopkins	0	–	1	–	0	0	–	2	–	0
Davidson	0	–	4	–	0	4	–	6	–	1
$ – Conference champion

The 1919 North Carolina Tar Heels football team represented the University of North Carolina in the 1919 college football season.

== Schedule ==
Date	Time	Opponent	Site	Result	Attendance	Source
October 4		at Rutgers	Neilson Field; New Brunswick, NJ	L 9–19		
October 11	3:00 p.m.	at Yale	Yale Bowl; New Haven, CT	L 7–34	10,000	
October 18		Wake Forest	Emerson Field; Chapel Hill, NC (rivalry)	W 6–0		
October 23	3:00 p.m.	at NC State	Riddick Field; Raleigh, NC (rivalry)	W 13–12	10,000	
November 1	2:30 p.m.	at Tennessee	Wait Field; Knoxville, TN	T 0–0		
November 8		VMI	Emerson Field; Chapel Hill, NC	L 7–29		
November 15	3:00 p.m.	vs. Davidson	Prince Albert Park; Winston-Salem, NC	W 10–0	2,000	
November 27	2:30 p.m.	Virginia	Emerson Field; Chapel Hill, NC (rivalry)	W 6–0	7,177	
All times are in Eastern time
