= Harris Coleman =

American football player, coach, and lawyer (1893–1972)

Biographical details
- Born: May 31, 1893; Stanford, Kentucky, U.S.
- Died: March 16, 1972 (aged 78); Louisville, Kentucky, U.S.

Playing career
- 1913–1916: Virginia
- Position: Guard

Coaching career (HC unless noted)
- 1919: Virginia

Head coaching record
- Overall: 2–5–2

Harris Woolfolk Coleman (May 31, 1893 – March 16, 1972) was an American college football player, and coach and lawyer. He served as the head football coach at the University of Virginia for one season in 1919, compiling a record of 2–5–2. Coleman was born in 1893 in Stanford, Kentucky. Coleman later practiced law in Louisville as a partner in the firm Coleman & White. He served as county attorney for Jefferson County, Kentucky from 1927 to 1934. He was also active in the Louisville-Jefferson County Republican organization. He died in 1972.

== Head coaching record ==
Year	Team	Overall	Conference	Standing	Bowl/playoffs
Virginia Orange and Blue (South Atlantic Intercollegiate Athletic Association) (1919)
1919	Virginia	2–5–2	1–1–1	T–7th	
Virginia:		2–5–2	1–1–1		
Total:		2–5–2			
