= 1919 NC State Aggies football team =

American college football season

1919 NC State Aggies football
- Conference: South Atlantic Intercollegiate Athletic Association
- Record: 7–2 (3–1 SAIAA)
- Head coach: Bill Fetzer (1st season)
- Home stadium: Riddick Stadium

1919 South Atlantic Intercollegiate Athletic Association football standings
	Conf.					Overall
Team	W		L		T	W		L		T
Georgetown $	2	–	0	–	0	7	–	3	–	0
Maryland State	4	–	1	–	0	5	–	4	–	0
NC State	3	–	1	–	0	7	–	2	–	0
North Carolina	3	–	1	–	0	4	–	3	–	1
Washington and Lee	2	–	1	–	0	8	–	1	–	0
VMI	4	–	2	–	0	6	–	2	–	0
Richmond	2	–	2	–	1	5	–	2	–	2
Virginia	1	–	1	–	1	2	–	5	–	2
VPI	2	–	4	–	0	5	–	4	–	0
William & Mary	1	–	3	–	0	2	–	6	–	1
Catholic University	0	–	1	–	0	1	–	6	–	1
St. John's (MD)	0	–	1	–	0	0	–	1	–	0
Johns Hopkins	0	–	1	–	0	0	–	2	–	0
Davidson	0	–	4	–	0	4	–	6	–	1
$ – Conference champion

The 1919 North Carolina State Aggies football team represented the NC State Aggies of North Carolina State University during the 1919 college football season. A year after losing to Georgia Tech 128 to 0, the Aggies achieve their largest win margin in program history, a 100–0 shutout of Hampton Roads Navy, one of the many highlights of NC State's turnaround 1919 season. NC State went 3–1 against conference opponents, playing North Carolina for the first time since 1905, and losing by a single point. For the first time, NC State achieved a seven-win season, which was not surpassed until 1927.

== Schedule ==
Date	Time	Opponent	Site	Result	Attendance	Source
September 27		Guilford*	Riddick Stadium; Raleigh, NC	W 80–0		
October 4		at Navy*	Worden Field; Annapolis, MD	L 0–49		
October 11		Hampton Roads Navy*	Riddick Stadium; Raleigh, NC	W 100–0		
October 18		Roanoke*	Riddick Stadium; Raleigh, NC	W 78–0		
October 23		North Carolina	Riddick Stadium; Raleigh, NC (rivalry)	L 12–13		
November 1		vs. VMI	Fair Grounds; Roanoke, VA	W 21–0		
November 8		vs. Davidson	Wearn Field; Charlotte, NC	W 36–6		
November 15	3:00 p.m.	vs. VPI	League Park; Norfolk, VA	W 3–0	4,500	
November 27		Wake Forest*	Riddick Stadium; Raleigh, NC (rivalry)	W 21–7		
*Non-conference game
