= 1919 VMI Keydets football team =

American college football season

1919 VMI Keydets football
- Conference: South Atlantic Intercollegiate Athletic Association
- Record: 6–2 (4–2 SAIAA)
- Head coach: Red Fleming (1st season)
- Home stadium: VMI Parade Ground

1919 South Atlantic Intercollegiate Athletic Association football standings
	Conf.					Overall
Team	W		L		T	W		L		T
Georgetown $	2	–	0	–	0	7	–	3	–	0
Maryland State	4	–	1	–	0	5	–	4	–	0
NC State	3	–	1	–	0	7	–	2	–	0
North Carolina	3	–	1	–	0	4	–	3	–	1
Washington and Lee	2	–	1	–	0	8	–	1	–	0
VMI	4	–	2	–	0	6	–	2	–	0
Richmond	2	–	2	–	1	5	–	2	–	2
Virginia	1	–	1	–	1	2	–	5	–	2
VPI	2	–	4	–	0	5	–	4	–	0
William & Mary	1	–	3	–	0	2	–	6	–	1
Catholic University	0	–	1	–	0	1	–	6	–	1
St. John's (MD)	0	–	1	–	0	0	–	1	–	0
Johns Hopkins	0	–	1	–	0	0	–	2	–	0
Davidson	0	–	4	–	0	4	–	6	–	1
$ – Conference champion

The 1919 VMI Keydets football team was an American football team that represented the Virginia Military Institute (VMI) during the 1919 college football season as a member of the South Atlantic Intercollegiate Athletic Association. In their only year under head coach Red Fleming, the team compiled an overall record of 6–2.

== Schedule ==
Date	Opponent	Site	Result	Source
September 27	Hampden–Sydney*	VMI Parade Ground; Lexington, VA	W 3–0	
October 10	vs. William & Mary	Boulevard Field; Richmond, VA (rivalry)	W 21–3	
October 18	at Virginia*	Lambeth Field; Charlottesville, VA	L 0–7	
November 1	vs. NC State	Fair Grounds; Roanoke, VA (rivalry)	L 0–21	
October 25	vs. Davidson	Lynchburg, VA	W 14–7	
November 8	at North Carolina	Emerson Field; Chapel Hill, NC	W 29–7	
November 15	Roanoke*	VMI Parade Ground; Lexington, VA	W 41–0	
November 27	vs. VPI	Fair Grounds; Roanoke, VA (rivalry)	W 13–0	
*Non-conference game
