= Charles A. Bernier =

American sports player, coach, and college administrator

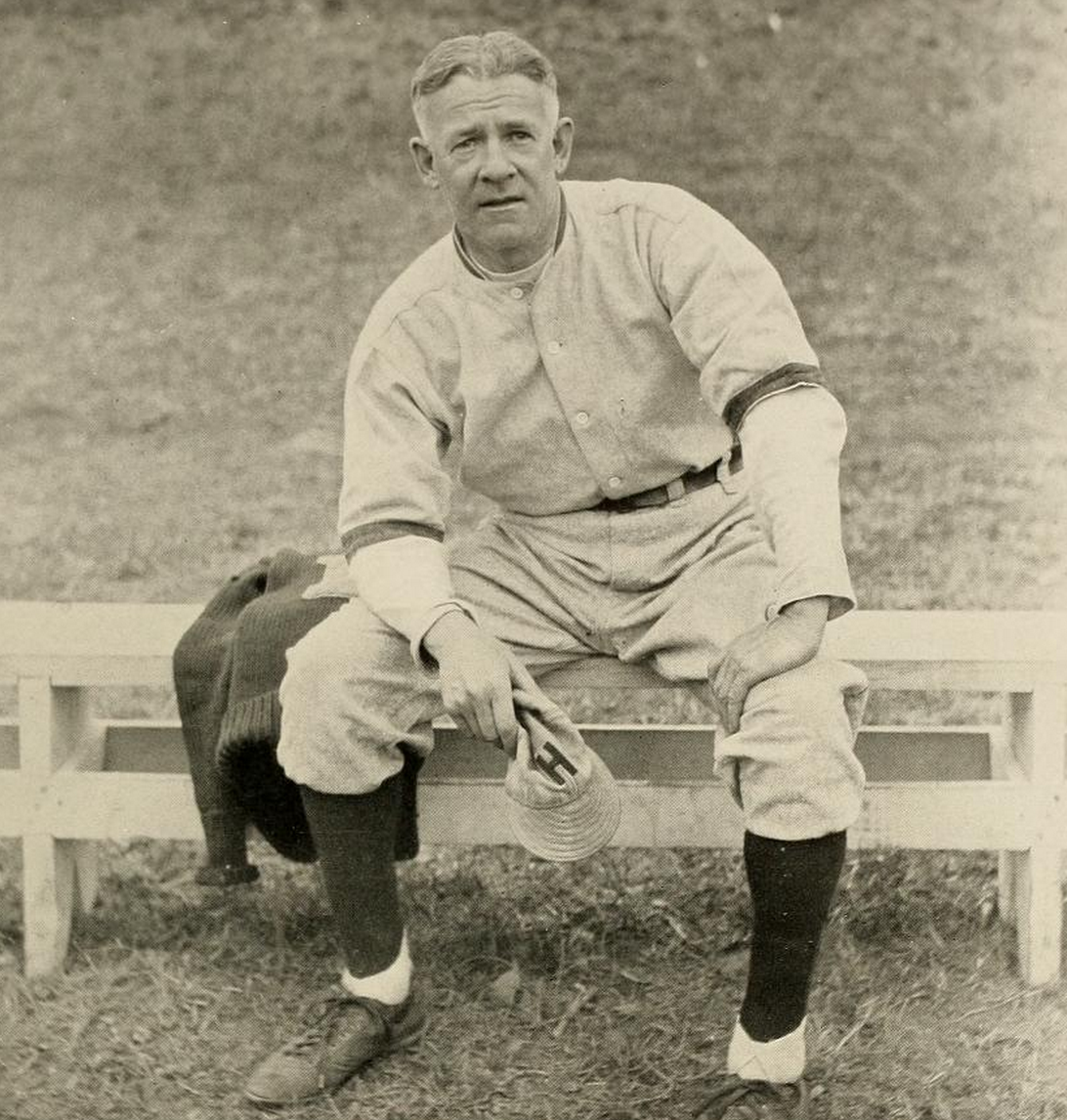
- Bernier pictured in Kaleidoscope 1936, Hampden–Sydney yearbook

Biographical details
- Born: July 21, 1890; Laconia, New Hampshire, U.S.
- Died: June 20, 1963 (aged 72); Cottondale, Alabama, U.S.

Coaching career (HC unless noted)

Football
- 1912–1916: Hampden–Sydney
- 1917–1919: Virginia Tech
- 1923–1938: Hampden–Sydney

Basketball
- 1912–1917: Hampden–Sydney
- 1917–1920: Virginia Tech
- 1920–1923: Alabama
- 1923–1940: Hampden–Sydney

Baseball
- 1912: New Hampshire
- 1918–1920: VPI
- 1921–1923: Alabama

Administrative career (AD unless noted)
- 1920–1923: Alabama

Head coaching record
- Overall: 87–106–18 (football); 242–219 (basketball); 67–65–4 (baseball)

Accomplishments and honors

Championships
- Football; 2 EVIAA (1915–1916); 1 SAIAA (1918)

Charles Arthur "Yank" Bernier (July 21, 1890 – June 20, 1963) was an American football, basketball, and baseball player, coach, and college administrator. He served as the head football coach at Hampden–Sydney College from 1912 to 1916 and again from 1923 to 1938 and at Virginia Agricultural and Mechanical College and Polytechnic Institute (VPI)—now known as Virginia Tech— from 1917 to 1919, compiling a career college football record of 87–106–18. Bernier was also the head basketball coach at Hampden–Sydney (1912–1917, 1923–1940), Virginia Tech (1917–1920), and the University of Alabama (1920–1923), amassing a career college basketball record of 242–219. In addition, he was the head baseball coach at the University of New Hampshire (1912), Virginia Tech (1918–1920), and Alabama (1921–1923), tallying a career college baseball record of 67–65–4. Bernier also served as the athletic director at Alabama from 1920 to 1923.

Bernier played football, basketball, and baseball at Hampden–Sydney. He was the first student-athlete to be named captain of all three sports. He also attended VPI and compete in sports there. Bernier is a member of the Hampden–Sydney Sports Hall of Fame. The school's baseball field is named after him. He died on June 20, 1963, at his home in Cottondale, Alabama.

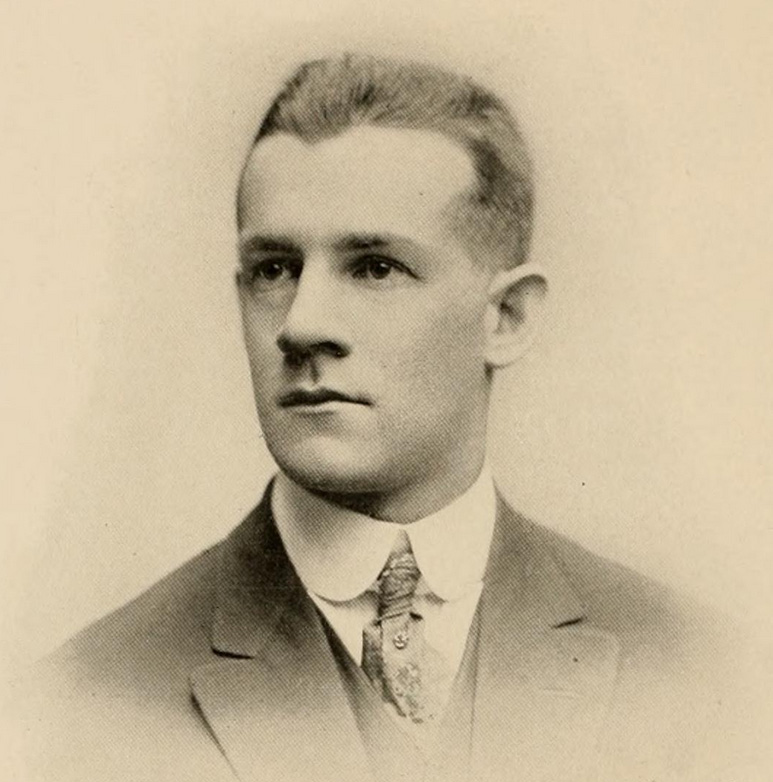
Bernier pictured in Kaleidoscope 1916, Hampden–Sydney yearbook

== Head coaching record ==
=== Football ===
Year	Team	Overall	Conference	Standing	Bowl/playoffs
Hampden–Sydney Tigers (Eastern Virginia Intercollegiate Athletic Association) (1912–1916)
1912	Hampden–Sydney	2–6	2–1	2nd	
1913	Hampden–Sydney	3–6	2–1	2nd	
1914	Hampden–Sydney	3–7–1	3–3	T–2nd	
1915	Hampden–Sydney	6–3	5–1	1st	
1916	Hampden–Sydney	6–3–2	4–1–2	T–1st	
VPI Gobblers (South Atlantic Intercollegiate Athletic Association) (1917–1919)
1917	VPI	6–2–1	2–1–1	T–3rd	
1918	VPI	7–0	4–0	1st	
1919	VPI	5–4	2–4	9th	
VPI:		18–6–1	8–5–1		
Hampden–Sydney Tigers (Independent) (1923)
1923	Hampden–Sydney	3–6			
Hampden–Sydney Tigers (Virginia–North Carolina Intercollegiate Athletic Conference) (1924)
1924	Hampden–Sydney	3–4–2			
Hampden–Sydney Tigers (Independent) (1925–1926)
1925	Hampden–Sydney	3–5–1			
1926	Hampden–Sydney	5–2–3			
Hampden–Sydney Tigers (Virginia Conference) (1927–1932)
1927	Hampden–Sydney	4–5	1–3	6th	
1928	Hampden–Sydney	3–6	2–3	6th	
1929	Hampden–Sydney	4–5	4–1	2nd	
1930	Hampden–Sydney	2–6–1	2–3–1	6th	
1931	Hampden–Sydney	3–6	2–3	T–4th	
1932	Hampden–Sydney	4–3–2	1–1–2	4th	
Hampden–Sydney Tigers (Chesapeake Conference) (1933–1936)
1933	Hampden–Sydney	3–4–2			
1934	Hampden–Sydney	4–4–2			
1935	Hampden–Sydney	5–5	2–1	2nd	
1936	Hampden–Sydney	3–5–1			
Hampden–Sydney Tigers (Independent) (1937–1938)
1937	Hampden–Sydney	2–8			
1938	Hampden–Sydney	2–6			
Hampden–Sydney:		73–105–17			
Total:		91–111–18			
National championship Conference title Conference division title or championship game berth
