= 1919 William & Mary Indians football team =

American college football season

1919 William & Mary Indians football
- Conference: South Atlantic Intercollegiate Athletic Association
- Record: 2–6–1 (1–3 SAIAA)
- Head coach: James G. Driver (1st season)
- Captain: R. W. Copeland

1919 South Atlantic Intercollegiate Athletic Association football standings
	Conf.					Overall
Team	W		L		T	W		L		T
Georgetown $	2	–	0	–	0	7	–	3	–	0
Maryland State	4	–	1	–	0	5	–	4	–	0
NC State	3	–	1	–	0	7	–	2	–	0
North Carolina	3	–	1	–	0	4	–	3	–	1
Washington and Lee	2	–	1	–	0	8	–	1	–	0
VMI	4	–	2	–	0	6	–	2	–	0
Richmond	2	–	2	–	1	5	–	2	–	2
Virginia	1	–	1	–	1	2	–	5	–	2
VPI	2	–	4	–	0	5	–	4	–	0
William & Mary	1	–	3	–	0	2	–	6	–	1
Catholic University	0	–	1	–	0	1	–	6	–	1
St. John's (MD)	0	–	1	–	0	0	–	1	–	0
Johns Hopkins	0	–	1	–	0	0	–	2	–	0
Davidson	0	–	4	–	0	4	–	6	–	1
$ – Conference champion

The 1919 William & Mary Indians football team represented the College of William & Mary as a member of the South Atlantic Intercollegiate Athletic Association (SAIAA) during the 1919 college football season. Led by first-year head coach James G. Driver, William & Mary finished the season with an overall record of 2–6–1 and a mark of 1–3 in SAIAA play.

== Schedule ==
Date	Opponent	Site	Result	Source
October 4	at Lynchburg*	Lynchburg, VA	T 0–0	
October 10	vs. VMI	Boulevard Field; Richmond, VA (rivalry)	W 3–21	
October 18	Richmond	Williamsburg, VA (rivalry)	L 7–0	
October 27	Randolph–Macon*	Williamsburg, VA	W 3–0	
November 1	vs. Hampden–Sydney*	Norfolk, VA	L 3–7	
November 8	at Richmond	Boulevard Field; Richmond, VA	L 0–17	
November 15	vs. Randolph–Macon*	Richmond, VA	L 6–7	
November 22	Hampden–Sydney*	Williamsburg, VA	L 6–7	
November 27	at Richmond	Boulevard Field; Richmond, VA	L 0–21	
*Non-conference game
