= Pete Crayton =

American football coach and businessman

Biographical details
- Born: November 27, 1894; Anderson, South Carolina, U.S.
- Died: 1958 (aged 63–64); Pinellas County, Florida, U.S.
- Education: Davidson

Coaching career (HC unless noted)
- 1919: Davidson

Head coaching record
- Overall: 4–6–1

Louis Broyles "Pete" Crayton Sr. (November 27, 1894 – April 1958) was an American college football coach and businessman. He served as the head football coach at his alma mater, Davidson College, for a single season in 1919, compiling a record of 4–6–1. He took time away from his business ventures to accept the coaching position on short notice.

== Head coaching record ==
Year	Team	Overall	Conference	Standing	Bowl/playoffs
Davidson Wildcats (South Atlantic Intercollegiate Athletic Association) (1919)
1919	Davidson	4–6–1	0–4	14th	
Davidson:		4–6–1	0–4		
Total:		4–6–1			
