= 1919 Richmond Spiders football team =

American college football season

1919 Richmond Spiders football
- Conference: South Atlantic Intercollegiate Athletic Association
- Record: 5–2–2 (2–2–1 SAIAA)
- Head coach: Frank Dobson (6th season)
- Captain: Henry Carter
- Home stadium: Boulevard Field

1919 South Atlantic Intercollegiate Athletic Association football standings
	Conf.					Overall
Team	W		L		T	W		L		T
Georgetown $	2	–	0	–	0	7	–	3	–	0
Maryland State	4	–	1	–	0	5	–	4	–	0
NC State	3	–	1	–	0	7	–	2	–	0
North Carolina	3	–	1	–	0	4	–	3	–	1
Washington and Lee	2	–	1	–	0	8	–	1	–	0
VMI	4	–	2	–	0	6	–	2	–	0
Richmond	2	–	2	–	1	5	–	2	–	2
Virginia	1	–	1	–	1	2	–	5	–	2
VPI	2	–	4	–	0	5	–	4	–	0
William & Mary	1	–	3	–	0	2	–	6	–	1
Catholic University	0	–	1	–	0	1	–	6	–	1
St. John's (MD)	0	–	1	–	0	0	–	1	–	0
Johns Hopkins	0	–	1	–	0	0	–	2	–	0
Davidson	0	–	4	–	0	4	–	6	–	1
$ – Conference champion

The 1919 Richmond Spiders football team was an American football team that represented the Richmond College—now known as the University of Richmond—as a member of the South Atlantic Intercollegiate Athletic Association (SAIAA) during the 1919 college football season. Frank Dobson returned for his sixth year as a head coach, having helmed the team from 1913 to 1917. Richmond compiled an overall record of 5–2–2 with a mark of 2–2–1 in SAIAA play.

== Schedule ==
Date	Opponent	Site	Result	Source
October 4	at Virginia	Lambeth Field; Charlottesville, VA	T 0–0	
October 11	at VPI	Miles Field; Blacksburg, VA	L 0–21	
October 18	at William & Mary	Williamsburg, VA (rivalry)	L 0–7	
October 26	Hampden–Sydney	Richmond, VA	W 7–0	
November 1	Randolph–Macon	Richmond, VA	W 27–7	
November 8	William & Mary	Boulevard Field; Richmond, VA	W 17–0	
November 15	at Hampden–Sydney	Hampden Sydney, VA	T 0–0	
November 22	Randolph–Macon	Richmond, VA	W 22–0	
November 27	William & Mary	Boulevard Field; Richmond, VA	W 21–0	
