= Henry Parke Airey =

Australian colonial soldier

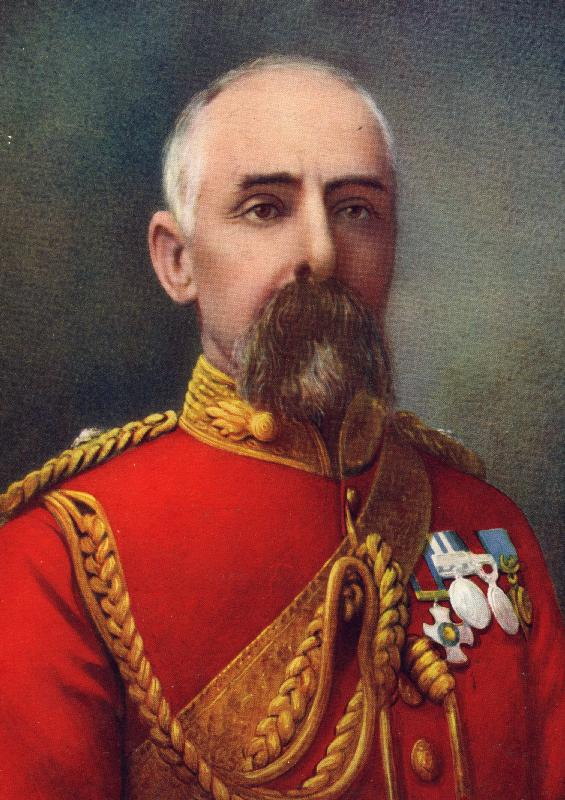
- Colonel Henry Airey c. 1902
- Born: 3 August 1842; Yorkshire, England
- Died: 11 October 1911 (aged 69); Transvaal, South Africa
- Spouse: Florence Ada McCulloch (m. 1868)
- Military career
- Allegiance: United Kingdom; Colony of New South Wales
- Branch: British Army; New South Wales Artillery
- Service years: 1859–1866; 1877–1902
- Rank: Colonel
- Conflicts: Mahdist War; Second Boer War
- Awards: Companion of the Order of St Michael and St George; Companion of the Distinguished Service Order; Mentioned in Despatches

Colonel Henry Parke Airey, CMG, DSO (3 August 1842 – 9 October 1911) was an Australian colonial soldier.

Airey, the son of Captain Henry Cookson Airey of the East India Company and his wife Emily, was born in Kingthorpe, Yorkshire in 1842. He was educated at Marlborough and East India Company College in 1858–59.

Airey was of the New South Wales Artillery, was formerly in the 101st Foot; and having become attached to the New South Wales military forces, of which he became captain in March 1886, served in the Sudan Campaign with the colonial contingent, receiving a medal, with clasp, for the advance on Tamai. He served with the British army in Burma in 1886 and 1887, and having behaved with great gallantry and been severely wounded, was created a Companion of the Distinguished Service Order in 1888—and reputedly became the first Australian soldier to be so decorated—was mentioned in despatches, and pensioned by the Government of India. In further recognition of his brilliant services in Burma, he was, in June 1887, appointed a brevet-major in the New South Wales forces by Lord Carrington, then Governor of that colony.

Airey served as a colonel in the artillery in the Sudan, and as a lieutenant colonel during the Boer War where he was appointed a Companion of the Order of St Michael and St George.

Airey married Florence Ada McCulloch, daughter of A. H. McCulloch, in 1868, in Sydney, and they had issue.
