= James Airy =

English cricketer and British Army officer (1884–1920)

Personal information
- Full name: James Osmund Airy
- Born: 18 May 1884; Kings Norton, Warwickshire, England
- Died: 21 July 1920 (aged 36); Ballyvourney, Ireland
- Batting: Unknown
- Bowling: Unknown

Domestic team information
- Years: Team
- 1905/06–1908/09: Europeans

Career statistics
Competition	First-class
Matches	6
Runs scored	172
Batting average	17.20
100s/50s	–/–
Top score	38*
Balls bowled	30
Wickets	0
Bowling average	–
5 wickets in innings	–
10 wickets in match	–
Best bowling	–
Catches/stumpings	3/–
- Source: ESPNcricinfo, 20 January 2021

James Osmund Airy (18 May 1884 – 21 July 1920) was an English first-class cricketer and British Army officer.

The son of the historian Osmund Airy, he was born at Kings Norton in May 1884. He was educated at Repton School, deciding upon the completion of his education to take a career in the military. Going up to the Royal Military College, he graduated into the British Indian Army as a second lieutenant in January 1903. Serving with the 114th Mahrattas, he was promoted to lieutenant in April 1905. While serving in British India, he played first-class cricket for the Europeans cricket team between 1905 and 1908, making six appearances. He scored 172 runs across his six matches, averaging 17.20 and with a high score of 38 not out. He resigned from the British Indian Army in February 1909.

He later returned to military service during the First World War, initially serving as a lieutenant in the Essex Regiment, before transferring to the Manchester Regiment. He was promoted to captain in November 1916, with seniority antedated to October of the same year. Airy was temporarily promoted to major in December 1917, while in March of the following year he was appointed an acting lieutenant colonel while commanding a battalion. Serving throughout the war, he saw action in Egypt and Gallipoli, in addition to the Western Front.

Following the war, he was briefly seconded from the Manchester Regiment in April 1919. He returned to the regiment in October 1919 and was posted to Ireland during the Irish War of Independence, where he commanded 50 men at Ballincollig. He journeyed north to Macroom, where it was alleged on 17 July 1920 that he had assaulted a schoolgirl on her way home from school. Enraged by this, the Fermoy IRA sought revenge. On 18 July, they set up an ambush at Coolavokig, situated along the road between Ballyvourney and Macroom, where they laid in wait for three days. Airy was travelling as a passenger on board a rations lorry on 21 July, when it was ambushed by thirty IRA men that had laid in wait for him. He was fatally shot in the abdomen and succumbed to his wounds later that evening, alongside a Private Barlow.
