= Airey house =

Type of prefabricated house in the UK

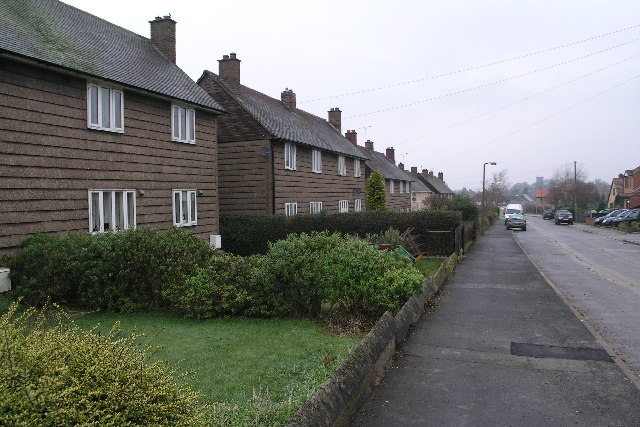
Airey Houses in Harthill, South Yorkshire, showing the original shiplap panels

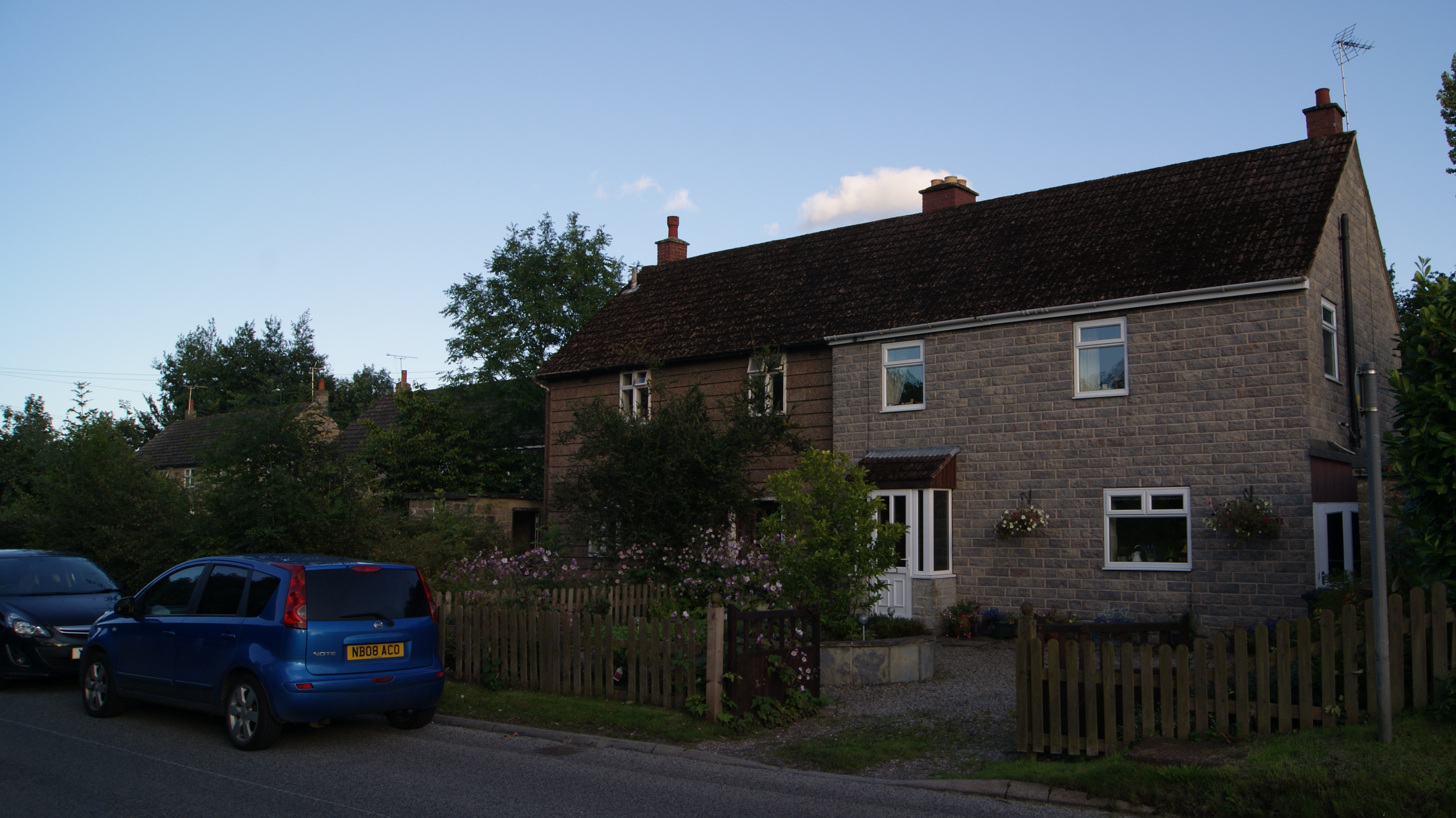
Unrefurbished (left) and refurbished (right) Airey houses in Sicklinghall, North Yorkshire. Note the increased thickness of the insulation and new cladding on the refurbished house.

An Airey house is a type of prefabricated house built in United Kingdom following the Second World War.

== Overview ==
Designed by Sir Edwin Airey to the Ministry of Works Emergency Factory Made housing programme, it features a frame of prefabricated concrete columns reinforced with tubing recycled from the canvas tilt frames of military trucks. A series of shiplap style concrete panels, tied back to the columns, form the external envelope.

== In media ==
In 1947, the Central Office of Information commissioned a propaganda film, Country Homes. The directoral debut of the later acclaimed documentary maker Paul Dickson, the film promotes the building of Airey houses in rural areas as a solution to the poor condition (due to the 1930s depression followed by wartime neglect) of much of the housing stock outside Britain's conurbations, due to the ease with which the prefabricated sections could be transported to remote locations.

== Present ==
Today the Airey houses are life expired and many are in disrepair. The houses are one of a number of precast concrete systems listed in the Housing Defects Act. This meant that Government help for private owners was available in certain cases. Generally they are not accepted for mortgages unless repaired in accordance with certain prescribed methods. In the mid-2000s, one company began testing a refurbishment programme. Their programme involves replacing the concrete slabs with blocks, covered the blocks with insulation, and then facing the structure with brick. It is hoped this remodel will result in a warmer and more structurally sound house.

== See also ==
- Prefabs in the United Kingdom
