= Osmund Airy =

19th and early 20th-century English historian

- Born: October 1845
- Died: 30 November 1928 (aged 83)
- Spouse: Eleanor Butler
- Parent: George Biddell Airy

Osmund Airy (October 1845 – 30 November 1928) was an English historian who specialised in early modern Great Britain and Ireland and especially Charles II and the Restoration.

He was born in October 1845 at the Royal Observatory, Greenwich, the youngest son of Sir George Biddell Airy, the Astronomer Royal. He was educated at Blackheath Proprietary School and Trinity College, Cambridge. He briefly served as an assistant at Blackheath before he joined the staff at Wellington where he stayed until 1876, when he was appointed as an Inspector of Schools. In 1904, he became a divisional inspector, retiring in 1910.

He edited the first part of Gilbert Burnet's History of His Own Time that concerns the reign of Charles II and published it in two volumes.

His son was James Airy, a cricketer and soldier who was killed in the Irish War of Independence.

== Works ==
- Burnet, Gilbert (1897). Airy, Osmund (ed.). Bishop Burnet's History of His Own Time: Part I The Reign of Charles the Second. Vol. 1 (New ed.). Oxford: The Clarendon Press. – Scottish Reformation to 1672
- Burnet, Gilbert (1900). Airy, Osmund (ed.). Bishop Burnet's History of His Own Time: Part I The Reign of Charles the Second. Vol. 2 (New ed.). Oxford: The Clarendon Press. – 1673 to 1685
- Airy, Osmund (1904). Charles II, King of England, 1630–1685. London: Longmans, Green, and Co. OCLC 1041771783.
- Airy, Osmund (1905). The English Restoration and Louis XIV. London: Longmans, Green, and Co. OCLC 651778597.

=== Contributions to the Dictionary of National Biography ===
Airy has contributed 19 articles to the DNB. Among them:

- Airy, Osmund (1886). "Butler, James, twelfth Earl and first Duke of Ormonde (1610–1688)". In Lee, Sidney (ed.). Dictionary of National Biography. Vol. 8. New York: MacMillan and Co. pp. 52–60. OCLC 8544105.
- Airy, Osmund (1886). "Butler, Thomas, Earl of Ossory (1634–1680)". In Lee, Sidney (ed.). Dictionary of National Biography. Vol. 8. New York: MacMillan and Co. pp. 81–85. OCLC 8544105.
- Airy, Osmund (1886). "Butler, Walter, of Kilcash, eleventh Earl of Ormonde (1569–1633)". In Lee, Sidney (ed.). Dictionary of National Biography. Vol. 8. New York: MacMillan and Co. p. 86. OCLC 8544105.
- Airy, Osmund (1886). "Burnet, Gilbert (1643–1715". In Lee, Sidney (ed.). Dictionary of National Biography. Vol. 7. New York: MacMillan and Co. pp. 394–405. OCLC 8544105.
