= John Robinson Airey =

British schoolteacher, mathematician and astrophysicist (1868–1937)

- Born: John Robinson Airey; 1868; Hunslet, Leeds, England
- Died: 16 September 1937 (aged 69); Newtown, Wales
- Education: BSc, London (1894); BA, St Johns, Cambridge (1906); DSc, London (1915); ScD, Cambridge (1926)
- Alma mater: Leeds Central High School; Yorkshire College; St John's College, Cambridge
- Occupations: schoolteacher, mathematician and astronomer
- Children: 1
- Relatives: Edwin Airey (brother)

John Robinson Airey (1868–1937) was a British schoolteacher, mathematician and astrophysicist.

== Early life ==
Airey was the eldest child of William Airey, a stone mason, and Elizabeth Airey, who were both born in Preston under Scar, North Yorkshire. He was the oldest from four siblings, the other three being Elizabeth Ann (born 1870), Edwin (1878–1955), and Maud (about 1880). The 1871 census showed the family was living at Hunslet, Leeds; by 1881 they had moved to 28 Grosvenor Street, West Leeds.

== Teaching career ==
In his youth, Airey studied at Blenheim Board School and Leeds Central High School. He then worked as an teaching assistant at the high school in the science department. At the same time he studied at Yorkshire College (later the University of Leeds) for a University of London external B.Sc., (Note: As Yorkshire College, the college did not award its own degrees.) which was awarded in 1894.

From 1896 Airey taught maths at Porth Intermediate School, Glamorganshire, until 1903. At the age of 35 he left Porth to matriculate at St. John's College, Cambridge, for three years as a foundation scholar; reading the Natural Science Tripos. In 1906 he received his Bachelor of Arts with first-class honours. Additionally, he received 3 awards from the college: Wright's prize for distinguished performance, the Hockin prize in electricity and experimental physics, and the Hughes prize for best third-year student.

After attaining his degree, Airey went on to work in administering school systems. From 1906 to 1912 he worked as the headmaster of Morley Grammar School, now The Morley Academy.

In 1912 he moved to London and became principal of the West Ham Technical Institute, a post he held until 1918. In 1915, while at West Ham, he was awarded a Doctorate of Science (D.Sc.) by London University.

His final position was as principal of the City of Leeds Training College from 1918 until his retirement in 1933. On retirement an Address was presented to him:-

Not only by your own achievements, but in your own addresses to us, you have held up the torch of learning-learning which can only be won by persistent and earnest effort.
Serene in calm and storm, you have at all times steered a straight course, your actions characterized by sincerity of purpose and a love of what is right.
You will live in our memories as a Principal and a friend whose words were few, and whose happy and kindly disposition shone out so brightly that even your reproofs were tinged with humour. Not least we shall cherish your memory because you showed us a religion based on simple faith and a reverential search for truth.

In 1926 he was granted a second doctorate, an Sc.D. of Cambridge.

== Mathematics ==
Airey became a member of the Mathematical Tables Committee of the British Association for the Advancement of Science in 1911 and was its secretary from 1916 to 1929. He published many of his own tables Mathematical Tables and Other Aids to Computation, Reports of the British Association for the Advancement of Science and in Proceedings of the London Physical Society. He was also co-editor of the Philosophical Magazine.

When at Cambridge he showed an interest in computation in general, particularly in Bessel and the hypergeometric functions. He spent the rest of his life developing methods to compute these functions and tabulated many sets of functions: Neumann functions, sines and cosines in radian measure (needed in turn for the computation of transcendental functions), the Lommel-Weber function and the confluent hypergeometric functions. In a collation of notable mathematical table makers, Archibald (Note: cited in) lists Airey as one of the most prolific compilers of tables, with 49 to his credit.

Many of these tables were of relevance to Airey's interest in astronomy and astrophysics. According to Dr Comrie, the British Association's tables of Emden's function (Note: The solution for $\theta=\theta(\xi)$ of the Lane–Emden equation) were calculated by methods suggested by Airey.

Airey joined the Royal Astronomical Society in 1912 and was elected a Fellow in 1931.

He joined the Edinburgh Mathematical Society in November 1913, when at West Ham.

== Personal life ==
His brother, Sir Edwin Airey was an industrialist responsible for the Airey prefabricated houses constructed in the UK after the Second World War.

In 1910 Airey married Gwenllian. (Note: Gwenllian is a traditional Welsh name, with medieval origins.) She had been born at Ystradyfodwg, Glamorgan, about 1880.

He died aged 69 on 16 September 1937 at his home of Llwynon, Newtown, Montgomeryshire, Wales, after an illness of six months.

His obituaries appeared in Nature and the Monthly Notices of the Royal Astronomical Society.

== Publications ==
- Airey, John R. (1910). "The Roots of the Neumann and Bessel Functions". Proc. Phys. Soc. 23 (1). London: 219–224. Bibcode:1910PPSL...23..219A. doi:10.1088/1478-7814/23/1/321.
- —— (1910–1911). "The Vibrations of Circular Plates and their Relation to Bessel Functions". Proc. Phys. Soc. 23 (1). London: 225–232. Bibcode:1910PPSL...23..225A. doi:10.1088/1478-7814/23/1/322.
- —— (1916). "Sines and cosines of angles in circular measure". British Association for the Advancement of Science Report: 60–91.
- —— (1918). "The Lommel-Weber Ω Function and Its Application to the Problem of Electric Waves on a Thin Anchor Ring". Proc. R. Soc. Lond. A. 94 (661): 307–314. Bibcode:1918RSPSA..94..307A. doi:10.1098/rspa.1918.0018.
- —— (1919). "Zonal Harmonics of High Order in Terms of Bessel Functions". Proc. R. Soc. Lond. A. 96 (674): 1–8. Bibcode:1919RSPSA..96....1A. doi:10.1098/rspa.1919.0033.
- —— (1938). "The Radiation Integrals". Philos. Mag. 25 (167): 273–282. doi:10.1080/14786443808562011.
