= Marv Mattox =

American football player, coach, and official (1899–1956)

Personal information
- Born: February 11, 1899; Leesville, Virginia, U.S.
- Died: May 5, 1956 (aged 56); Salisbury, North Carolina, U.S.
- Listed height: 5 ft 9 in (1.75 m)
- Listed weight: 170 lb (77 kg)

Career information
- High school: Waynesboro (VA) Fishburne Military
- College: Washington and Lee

Career history
- Milwaukee Badgers (1923)

Awards and highlights
- All-Southern (1919)

Career statistics
- Games played: 5
- Stats at Pro Football Reference

Marvin Bruce "Monk" Mattox (February 11, 1899 – May 5, 1956) was an American football player, coach and official. He was also an oil company distributor.

== Playing career ==
Mattox was a guard in the National Football League. He played with the Milwaukee Badgers during the 1923 NFL season. He played college football for the Washington & Lee Generals, selected an All-Southern end in 1919.
