= Frank Airey =

English footballer

Personal information
- Date of birth: 1887
- Place of birth: Gainsborough, Lincolnshire, England
- Position: Goalkeeper

Senior career*
Years	Team	Apps	(Gls)
- Trinity Institute
1905	Gainsborough Trinity	2	(0)
- * Club domestic league appearances and goals

Frank Airey (born 1887) was a footballer who played in The Football League for Gainsborough Trinity. He also played for Trinity Institute.
