= Turner Bethel =

American football player (1895–1954)

Profile
- Position: Tackle

Personal information
- Born: March 18, 1895; Goochland, Virginia, U.S.
- Died: February 24, 1954 (aged 58); Richmond, Virginia, U.S.

Career information
- College: Washington & Lee (1917; 1919)

Awards and highlights
- All-Southern (1919)

Elmore Turner Bethel (March 18, 1895 – February 24, 1954) was a college football player.

== Early life ==
Elmore Turner Bethel was born on March 18, 1995, in Goochland County, Virginia, to Lavinia (née Harrison) and Albert W. Bethel. He graduated from John Marshall High School, where he played on football and basketball teams. His brother Ralph C. Bethel was a member of the Richmond city council.

== Washington & Lee ==
Bethel was a prominent tackle for the Washington & Lee Generals football team of Washington & Lee University. He was a center on the basketball team. He was a member of Kappa Sigma.

=== 1917 ===
Bethel was injured in the 63 to 0 loss to Georgia Tech, for years called the south's greatest team.

=== 1919 ===
Bethel was captain of the 1919 team. In his last game, a win over Tulane, he "covered himself with glory as well as mud." He was selected All-Southern.

== Career ==
After leaving Washington and Lee, Bethel played football at the Richmond Athletic Club. During World War I, he served in the naval aviation corps. He worked as a salesman of pianos and organs for Walter D. Moses & Co. in Richmond. He also worked for R. S. Montgomery Inc. and Marlowe Tire Company. He was a member of the Clay Ward Democratic Club.

== Personal life ==
Bethel was a member of the First Baptist Church. Bethel died following a heart attack on February 24, 1954, at his home on Stafford Street in Richmond. He was buried in Hollywood Cemetery.
