= Cloy Mattox =

American baseball player (1902–1985)

- Catcher
- Born: November 24, 1902; Leesville, Virginia
- Died: August 3, 1985 (aged 82); Danville, Virginia
- Batted: Left Threw: Right

MLB debut
- September 1, 1929, for the Philadelphia Athletics

Last MLB appearance
- September 21, 1929, for the Philadelphia Athletics

MLB statistics
- Games played: 3
- At bats: 6
- Hits: 1
- Stats at Baseball Reference

Teams
- Philadelphia Athletics (1929)

Cloy Mitchell Mattox (November 24, 1902 – August 3, 1985) nicknamed "Monk", was an American Major League Baseball catcher. He played for the Philadelphia Athletics during the 1929 season. He played college football with Frank Peake as part of the Pony Express backfield of Virginia Tech.
