= Robert Airey =

English cricketer and British Army officer

- Airey in August 1926

Personal information
- Full name: Robert Berkeley Airey
- Born: 21 September 1874; Southminster, Essex, England
- Died: 23 June 1933 (aged 58); Westminster, London, England
- Batting: Right-handed

Domestic team information
- Years: Team
- 1911: Hampshire

Career statistics
Competition	First-class
Matches	3
Runs scored	52
Batting average	10.40
100s/50s	–/–
Top score	30
Catches/stumpings	2/–
- Source: Cricinfo, 10 May 2010

Robert Berkeley Airey CMG DSO (21 September 1874 – 23 June 1933) was an English first-class cricketer and an officer in the British Army.

The son of Robert Airey senior, he was born in September 1874 at Southminster, Essex. Airey was educated at Tonbridge School, before attending the Royal Military College at Sandhurst. He graduated from there as a second lieutenant into the South Wales Borderers in March 1895. He transferred to the Army Service Corps (ASC) in January 1898, at which point he was also promoted to lieutenant, with a further promotion to captain following in January 1901. He saw active service in the Second Boer War in South Africa, from which he returned in September 1902. He was seconded for service with the Egyptian Army in November 1902, and stayed there until 1907.

Airey was appointed to the Army Service Corps Training Establishment at Aldershot Garrison in September 1911, having made three appearances in first-class cricket the month before for Hampshire, playing twice against Sussex and once against Surrey in the County Championship. In these, he scored 52 runs at an average of 10.40, with a highest score of 30.

In the ASC, he was promoted to major in April 1912 and served with it in the First World War. In November 1914, he was appointed a deputy-assistant quartermaster general, prior to being made a brevet lieutenant colonel in February 1915. During the war, Airey was made a Companion of the Distinguished Service Order in the 1916 Birthday Honours. He gained the full rank of lieutenant colonel in October 1916, with him later being invested as a Companion of the Order of St Michael and St George in the 1918 Birthday Honours for services rendered on the Western Front in France and Flanders. He was later appointed deputy director of supplies and transportation in September 1918.

Following the war, he was promoted to colonel in January 1921, prior to his retirement from active service in August 1924. Airey was invested into the Order of Saint John as an officer in June 1931. He died suddenly at Westminster in June 1933; his wife, Helen (whom he married in 1907), predeceased him by five years.
