= Edwin Airey =

British civil engineer and industrialist (1878–1955)

Sir Edwin Airey (7 February 1878 – 14 March 1955) was a British civil engineer and industrialist responsible for the Airey prefabricated houses constructed in the UK after the Second World War.

== Life ==
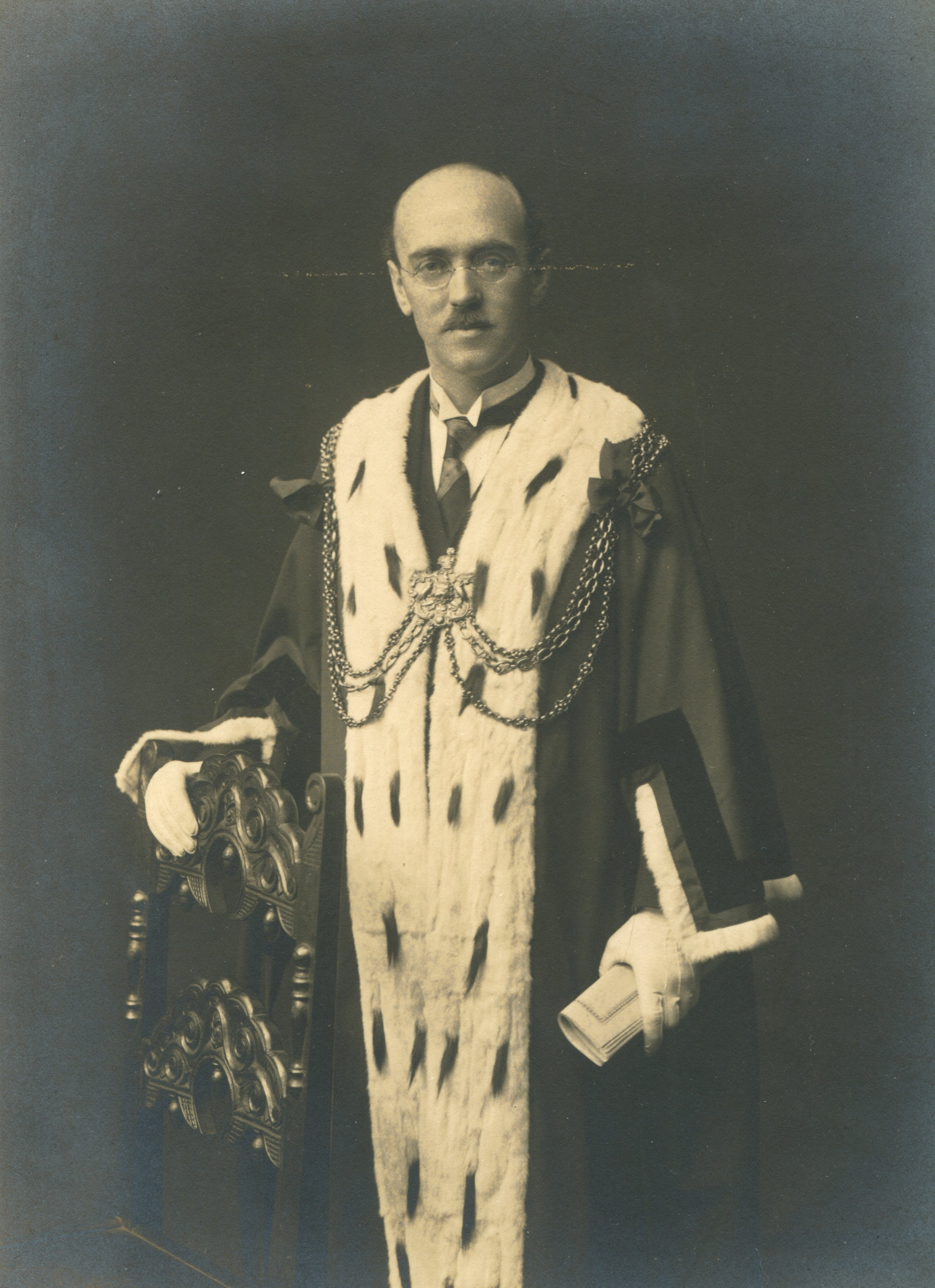

Airey was born in 1878, the son of William Airey. His older brother, John Robinson Airey (1868–1937) became a prominent mathematician. He attended Leeds Central High School and the Yorkshire College, and in 1904 married Edith Greaves: they had one son and four daughters. He took over his father's building business, W. M. Airey & Sons. During the First World War he was a transport advisor to the Ministry of Food. He and his company were very much involved with construction for the Ministry of Munitions, and then the Ministry of Health afterwards. It was for this and his work in social welfare that he was knighted in the King's Birthday Honours in 1922.

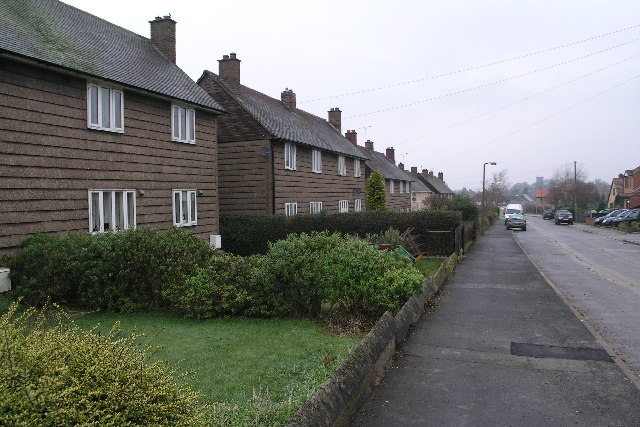
Airey Houses in Harthill, South Yorkshire, showing the original shiplap panels

During the Second World War the company produced huts for American troops stationed in the UK. This led to the development of concrete slab units which could be quickly assembled into houses to replace those destroyed during the war. Prototypes were put up in Seacroft, Leeds in 1945, followed by hundreds in the London County Council area. A total of 20,000 Airey houses were ordered: they were two storey semi-detached houses, initially to be used as two flats, then to be converted into single family homes once the post-war housing crisis was over. They were intended to be permanent dwellings rather than temporary ones.

He lived in Oakwood Grange where Louis Le Prince filmed the Roundhay Garden Scene in 1888, credited as the first motion picture.

Airey contributed to sports in Yorkshire in several ways. He was chairman of the Leeds Cricket, Football and Athletic Company, and was responsible for the development of Headingley Stadium and its establishment of a major cricketing venue.

Airey was an active member of the Conservative Party and became Lord Mayor of Leeds 1923–1924. Other high offices included High Sheriff of Yorkshire 1944–1945; Chairman of the Rugby Football League 1951–1952, Chairman of the Yorkshire Branch of the Institution of Structural Engineers 1944–1945.

He died 14 March 1955.
