= Mount Airy (Verona, Virginia) =

Historic house in Virginia, United States

- Mt. Airy
- U.S. National Register of Historic Places
- Virginia Landmarks Register
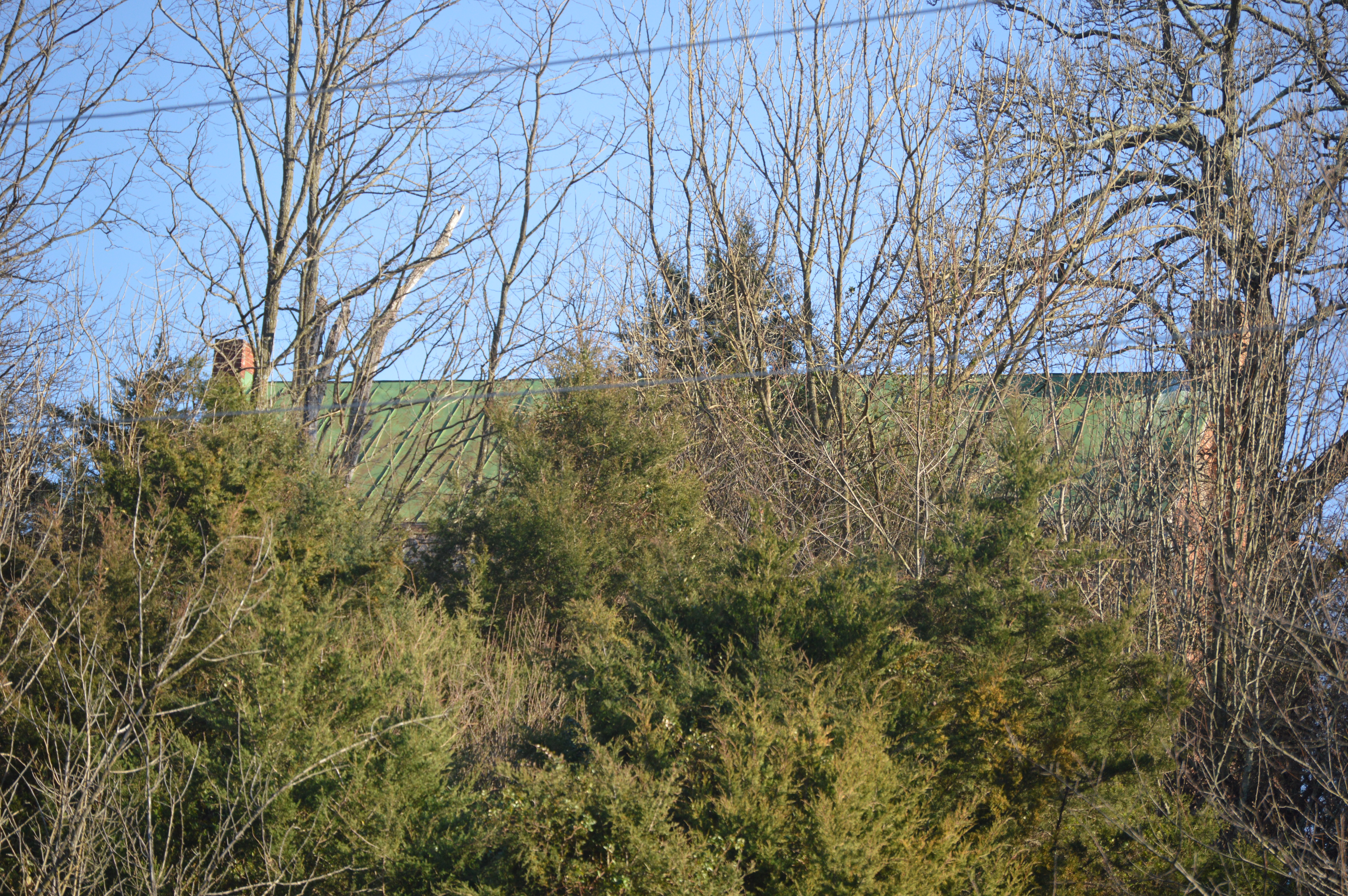
- View from the north

- Location within Virginia Location within the United States
- Location: Access road off of Technology Dr., southeast of Augusta County Government Center, Verona, Virginia
- Coordinates: 38°11′29″N 79°0′26″W
- Area: 400 acres (160 ha)
- Built: c. 1840, c. 1850
- NRHP reference No.: 12000538
- VLR No.: 007-1021

Significant dates
- Added to NRHP: August 22, 2012
- Designated VLR: June 21, 2012

Mount Airy, also known as the Grandma Moses House and Major James Crawford House, is a historic home located at Verona, Augusta County, Virginia. It was built about 1840, and is a two-story, five-bay, single-pile brick I-house. It has a rear 1 1/2-story, brick ell addition with porch built about 1850. Also on the property are a contributing washhouse (c. 1900), shed (c. 1900), and wagon house (c. 1921). The American artist Grandma Moses (1860–1961) and her husband Thomas Solomon Moses owned the house from January 1901 to September 1902. It was the first house they owned in their married lives.

It was listed on the National Register of Historic Places in 2012.
