= Bill Airey =

New Zealand educater and activist

Willis Thomas Goodwin Airey (7 January 1897 – 20 September 1968), commonly known as Bill Airey, was a New Zealand university professor, historian and peace activist.

== Early life, family and education ==
Airey was born in Auckland on 7 January 1897, three months after the death of his father, school inspector Walter Henry Airey. Walter Airey's death left his widow, Margaret, struggling to raise seven children. Willis Airey was an outstanding student at Remuera Primary School and Auckland Grammar School. In 1914 he won a scholarship to Auckland University College, where he excelled in English and Latin.

In 1917, Airey enlisted for service in World War I, serving in France. He returned to Auckland in 1919 and graduated with a Master of Arts in 1920. He was awarded a Rhodes Scholarship to study at Merton College, Oxford University. At Merton he studied history for the first time since Auckland Grammar, in an attempt to understand war and its causes and impacts.

Airey met Isobel Lilian Chadwick before leaving for Oxford, and married her in 1925 after he had returned to New Zealand. The couple went on to have two sons and a daughter.

== Academic career ==
Airey returned to New Zealand in 1923, to teach history and English at Christchurch Teachers' College. He developed a reputation as an excellent teacher.

In 1929 Airey returned to Auckland to become a lecturer in history at Auckland University College, where he remained until his retirement in 1961. He was promoted to Associate Professor in 1947.

Airey may be best known for his revisions of John B. Condliffe's Short History of New Zealand, which went into nine editions and was a standard school text until the 1960s. He trained many of New Zealand's leading historians of the 1960s and 1970s, including Keith Sinclair.

By the time of his retirement, Airey was, according to historian Michael Bassett, "one of New Zealand's best known historians, respected by students for his careful expression, a painstaking scholarship, and his 'humane and highly moral non-conformity'."

== Political activism ==
Throughout his academic career, Airey was heavily involved in social activist groups, including the Student Christian Movement, the League of Nations Union of New Zealand, the New Zealand Spanish Medical Aid Committee, the Workers Educational Association, and the New Zealand Peace Council. He admired the Soviet Union and was interested in Marxism, but did not join the New Zealand Communist Party.

== Death ==
Airey died in Auckland on 20 September 1968.
