= Johnny McQuade (American football) =

American football player (1895–1980)

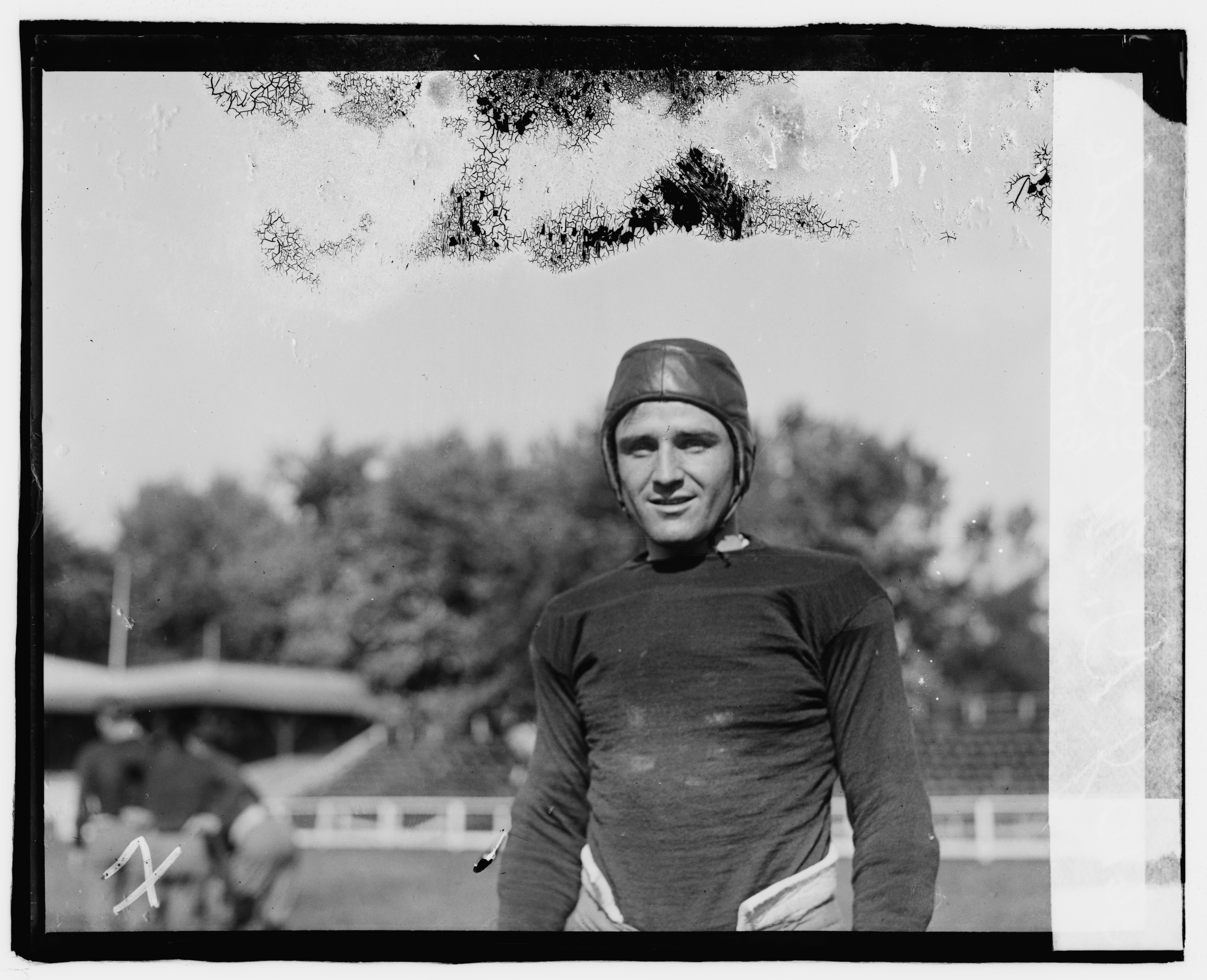

No. 2
- Positions: Halfback, linebacker

Personal information
- Born: June 4, 1895; Manchester, New Hampshire, U.S.
- Died: December 24, 1980 (aged 85); Pittsburgh, Pennsylvania, U.S.
- Listed height: 5 ft 10 in (1.78 m)
- Listed weight: 164 lb (74 kg)

Career information
- College: Georgetown University

Career history
- Canton Bulldogs (1922)

Awards and highlights
- NFL champion (1922)
- Stats at Pro Football Reference

John Doyle McQuade (June 4, 1895 – December 24, 1980) was an American professional football player who spent two years of the National Football League (NFL) with the Canton Bulldogs. McQuade won an NFL championship with the Bulldogs in the 1922 season. He played college football for Georgetown University.
