= Mount Airy (Leesville, Virginia) =

Historic house in Virginia, United States

- U.S. National Register of Historic Places
- Virginia Landmarks Register
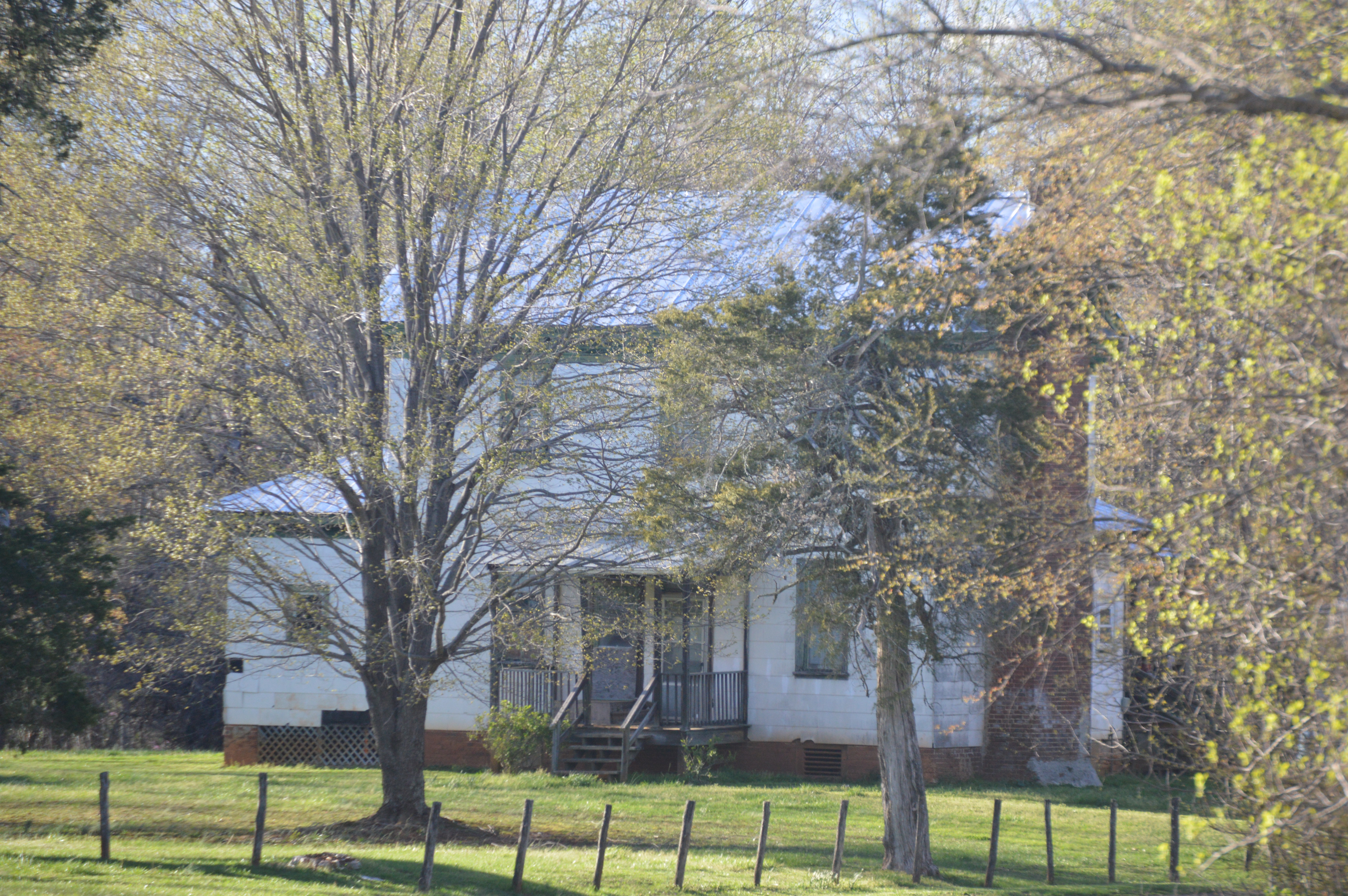
- Roadside view

- Location within Virginia Location within the United States
- Location: Jct. of VA 630 and VA 631, Leesville, Virginia
- Coordinates: 37°06′19″N 79°25′01″W
- Area: 22.9 acres (9.3 ha)
- Built: c. 1797–1800
- Architectural style: Federal
- NRHP reference No.: 90001823
- VLR No.: 009-0221

Significant dates
- Added to NRHP: December 19, 1990
- Designated VLR: October 16, 1990

Mount Airy is a historic home located in Bedford County, Virginia, near Leesville. It was built between about 1797 and 1800, and is a two-story, frame, hall-parlor plan house from the Federal period. It has a gable roof and exterior end chimneys. The house received several additions to the side and rear and the front entrance was altered about 1910. The interior retains most of its early woodwork, including a handsomely paneled hall. Also on the property are a contributing smokehouse and family cemetery.

It was listed on the National Register of Historic Places in 1990.
