= James Talbot Airey =

General Sir James Talbot Airey KCB
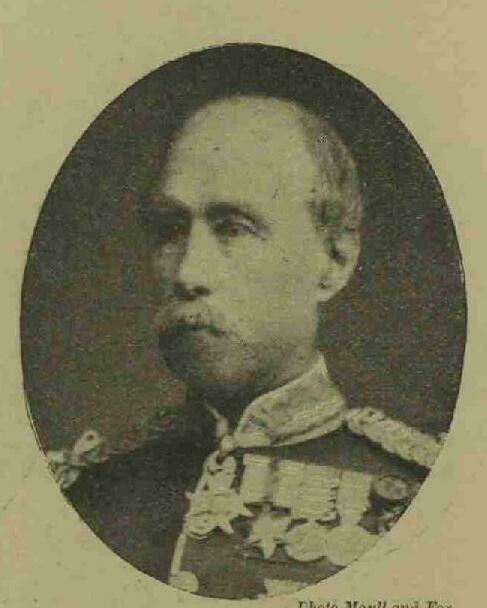
- Born: 6 September 1812
- Died: 1 January 1898 (aged 85); London
- Relatives: Sir George Airey (father); Richard Airey, 1st Baron Airey (brother)
- Military career
- Allegiance: United Kingdom of Great Britain and Ireland
- Branch: British Army
- Rank: General
- Units: 30th Foot; 3rd Buffs; Light Division; Coldstream Guards; Royal Inniskilling Fusiliers
- Conflicts: First Anglo-Afghan War; Crimean War; Battle of Alma; Battle of Balaclava; Battle of Inkerman; Assault on the Redan; Kerch Expedition
- Awards: Knight Commander of the Bath; Afghan Medal; Gwalior Star; Mentioned in Despatches (Five times); Crimea Medal; Legion of Honour (Fifth class); Turkish Crimea Medal; Order of the Medjidie (Fourth class)

Sir James Talbot Airey KCB (6 September 1812 – 1 January 1898) was an officer of the British Army. He served during the First Anglo-Afghan War and the Crimean War, rising to the rank of general.

== Biography ==
Airey was born on 6 September 1812, the son of Lieutenant-General Sir George Airey, by Catherine, sister of Richard Talbot, 2nd Baron Talbot de Malahide. Richard, Lord Airey, was his brother. He was commissioned as ensign in the 30th Foot on 11 February 1830, became lieutenant on 3 May 1833, and exchanged to the 3rd Buffs on 23 August. He was aide-de-camp to the governor of Madras, Sir Frederick Adam, from May 1834 to July 1837. On 26 January 1841 he was appointed extra aide-de-camp to Major-General William George Keith Elphinstone, and accompanied him to Afghanistan during the First Anglo-Afghan War. In the latter part of that year he was present at the forcing of the Khoord Cabul pass, and the actions near Kabul, and on 21 December he was given up of his own accord to Akbar Khan as a hostage. He was released with the other captives on 21 September 1842, joined the force sent into Kohistan under Brigadier M'Caskill, and was present at the capture of Istalif. He was twice mentioned in despatches (12 October 1841 and 30 September 1842), and received the Afghan medal. He also received the Gwalior Star for the Gwalior campaign of 1843, in which he took part with his regiment. He was promoted captain on 22 July 1842, and was aide-de-camp to the governor of Ceylon from April 1847 to March 1851. On 11 November 1851 he became regimental major, and on 17 July 1854 he exchanged to the Coldstream Guards as captain and lieutenant-colonel.

He served throughout the Crimea War with the Light Division as assistant quartermaster-general, being present at the Battles of Alma, Balaclava, Inkerman, and the assault on the Redan, and he accompanied the expedition to Kerch. He was three times mentioned in despatches (28 September and 11 November 1854, 18 September 1855). He received the Crimea Medal with four clasps, the Turkish Crimea Medal, the Legion of Honour (5th class), and the Medjidie (4th class). He was made a Companion of the Bath on 5 July 1855. He was promoted colonel on 26 December 1859, and became regimental major in the Coldstream Guards on 22 May 1866. He was promoted major-general on 6 March 1868, and commanded the troops at Malta from 21 August 1875 to 31 December 1878. He became lieutenant-general on 1 October 1877, and was placed on the retired list on 1 July 1881, with the honorary rank of general. He was made Knight Commander of the Bath on 2 June 1877, and colonel of the 2nd Battalion, Royal Inniskilling Fusiliers on 13 March 1886, a position he held until his death.

He died in London on 1 January 1898. He was unmarried.

Military offices
Preceded by Sir Arthur Edward Hardinge	2nd Battalion, Royal Inniskilling Fusiliers; 1886–1898	Succeeded by William Roberts
