= George Airey (British Army officer) =

Lieutenant-General Sir George Airey KCH
- Born: 1761; Killingworth, England
- Died: 1833 (aged 72); Paris, France
- Relatives: Richard Airey, 1st Baron Airey (son); John Airey (son); James Talbot Airey (son)
- Military career
- Allegiance: United Kingdom
- Branch: British Army
- Service years: 1779–1833
- Rank: Lieutenant-General
- Conflicts: French Revolutionary Wars; Napoleonic Wars
- Awards: Knight Commander of the Royal Guelphic Order

Lieutenant-General Sir George Airey KCH (1761–1833) was a British Army officer.

== Biography ==
Father of the better-known general and staff officer Richard Airey, he was born in 1761. He entered the army as an ensign in the 71st Regiment in 1779, and was promoted to lieutenant in 1781, when he transferred to the 48th Regiment and served with it in the West Indies. During his service there, he observed the military conditions of the islands, experience that formed the basis for his later advancement.

In 1788 he was promoted to captain, and might have remained one for a long time had not the war broken out with France in 1793. He was then thirty-two years of age, which, at a time when men became lieutenant colonels at twenty-three, meant but little chance of rising, but nevertheless by his topographical knowledge he managed to be of great assistance to Sir Charles Grey, who in 1793 reduced the French West India islands with the help of Sir John Jervis. Grey was so pleased with him that he recommended him to General Tonyn, who made him his aide-de-camp, and to Sir Ralph Abercromby. The latter, when he came out to reconquer the French West Indies which Victor Hugues had managed to regain for the republic, made him assistant adjutant-general to his force, and was very pleased by his conduct as a staff officer. It was one of Abercromby's great titles to fame that he always encouraged merit in officers and men, however unsupported by influence; and he therefore procured for George Airey a majority in the 68th in 1796 and a lieutenant colonelcy in the 8th regiment in 1798. To the same kind patron may be ascribed his selection as deputy-adjutant-general to the garrison of Menorca. This appointment prevented his accompanying the expedition to Egypt, where his patron was killed; but his activity and real merit soon won him a powerful friend in the influential General Henry Fox, the brother of the orator, and at this time governor and commander-in-chief in Menorca. The somewhat indolent general liked to have such an energetic man to save him trouble, and took him as military secretary to Ireland, when he was appointed commander-in-chief there in 1802. He there married the Hon. Catherine Talbot, daughter of Richard Talbot and his wife Margaret O'Reilly, who was Baron Talbot de Malahide in her own right. They had ten children.

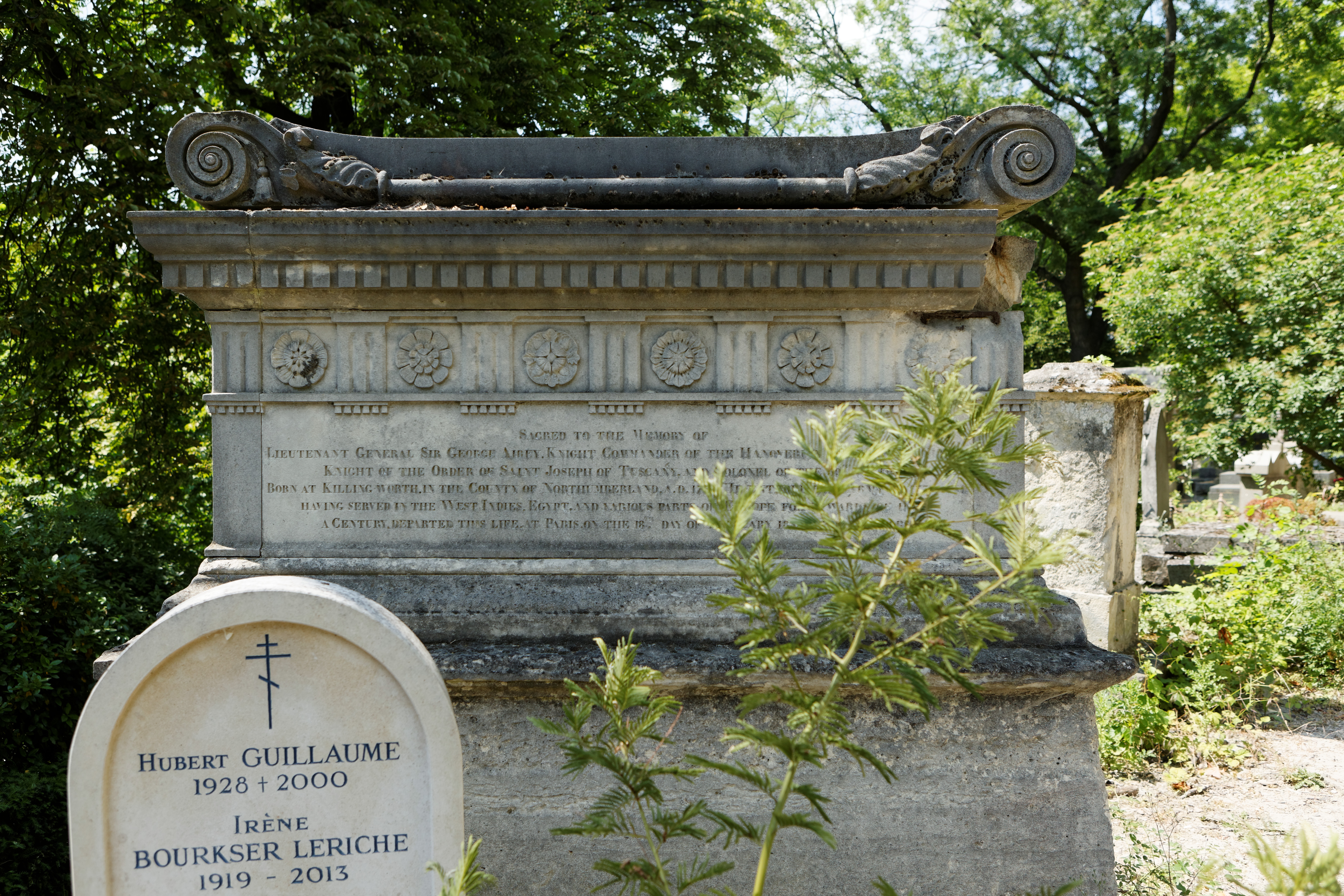
The tomb of George Airey in Père Lachaise Cemetery.

Airey accompanied General Fox to Sicily as military secretary in 1805, was deputy adjutant-general and military secretary to General Fraser in the disastrous expedition to Damietta in 1807, was promoted colonel in 1808, commanded a brigade in Sicily in 1810, was promoted major general in 1812, and appointed commandant of the forces in the Ionian islands in the same year. He was appointed quartermaster-general to the forces in Ireland in 1813, where he stayed many years, was promoted lieutenant general in 1821, received the command of the 39th Regiment in 1823, made a Knight Commander of the Royal Guelphic Order by George IV, and died at the age of 72 in 1833. Sir George Airey did not see any service except in the West Indies and at Rosetta, but nevertheless the value of his services to the army must not be underrated. His ability may be vouched for by the way Sir Ralph Abercromby, a strict judge of staff officers, took him into favour when only a captain, and his unfailing popularity with every chief he served under. "It is more rare to find an able staff officer," the Duke of Wellington stated, "than a good regimental officer," and this was not wholly due to the favouritism which pushed on incompetent persons.

Military offices
Preceded by General Nisbet Balfour	Colonel of the 39th (Dorsetshire) Regiment of Foot; 1823–1833	Succeeded by Lieutenant General Sir Robert O'Callaghan
