= Richard Airey, 1st Baron Airey =

British Army general

General The Right Honourable The Lord Airey GCB
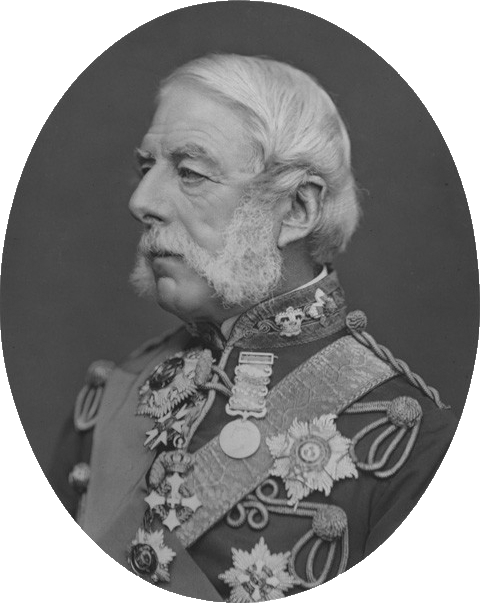
- Lord Airey
- Born: 1803; Newcastle upon Tyne, Northumberland, England
- Died: 14 September 1881 (aged 77–78); Leatherhead, Surrey, England
- Relatives: Lieutenant General Sir George Airey (father)
- Military career
- Allegiance: United Kingdom
- Branch: British Army
- Service years: 1821–1876
- Rank: General
- Conflicts: Crimean War
- Awards: Knight Grand Cross of the Order of the Bath; Commander of the Legion of Honour (France)

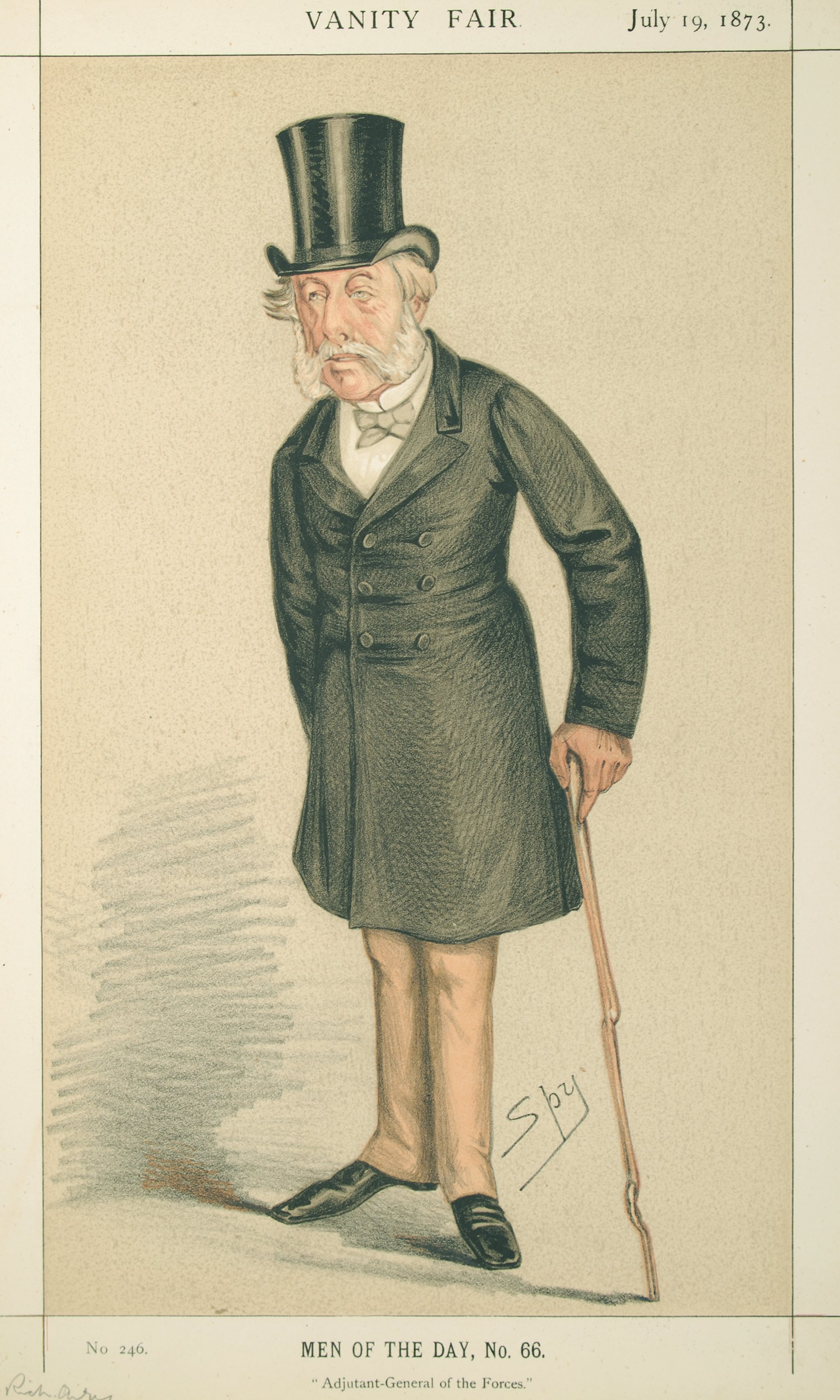
Caricatured by "Spy" for Vanity Fair, 1873

General Richard Airey, 1st Baron Airey, GCB (April 1803 – 14 September 1881), known as Sir Richard Airey between 1855 and 1876, was a senior British Army officer of the 19th century.

== Background ==
Born at Newcastle upon Tyne, Northumberland, Airey was the eldest son of Lieutenant General Sir George Airey and his wife Catherine Talbot, daughter of Richard Talbot and Margaret Talbot, 1st Baroness Talbot of Malahide.

== Military career ==
Airey was educated at the Royal Military College, Sandhurst, and entered the army as an ensign of the 34th (Cumberland) Regiment of Foot in 1821. He became captain in 1825, and served as aide-de-camp on the staff of Sir Frederick Adam in the Ionian Islands (1827–1830) and on that of Lord Aylmer in North America (1830–1832). In 1838 Airey, then a lieutenant colonel, went to Horse Guards as assistant adjutant-general. In 1847, he was appointed assistant quartermaster-general, an appointment he retained until 1851. From 1852 to 1854 he was Military Secretary to the commander-in-chief, Lord Hardinge.

In 1854 he was given a brigade command in the army sent out to the East, from which, however, he was rapidly transferred to the onerous and difficult post of Quartermaster-General under Lord Raglan, in which capacity he served through the campaign in the Crimean War. He was reported upon most favourably by his superiors, Lord Raglan and Sir James Simpson and for his performance was made a major general in December 1854 and was awarded a Knight Commander of the Order of the Bath (KCB). Following Raglan's instructions, Airey issued the fateful order for the Charge of the Light Brigade. He was also criticised for incompetence in the provision of supplies and transport. Airey demanded an enquiry on his return to England, which took place under Lord Seaton and which cleared him completely, but he never recovered from the effects of persecution from his critics.

In 1855 he returned to London to become Quartermaster-General to the Forces at home. In 1862 he was promoted to lieutenant general, and from 1865 to 1870 he was Governor of Gibraltar, being appointed a Knight Grand Cross of the Order of the Bath (GCB) in 1867. In 1870 he became Adjutant-General to the Forces at Headquarters, and in the following year attained the full rank of general. On 29 November 1876, on his retirement, he was elevated to the Peerage of the United Kingdom as Baron Airey, of Killingworth in the County of Northumberland. During 1879–1880 he presided over the celebrated Airey Commission on army reform.

== Family ==
In 1838, he married his cousin, Harriet Mary Everard Talbot (d. 28 July 1881), daughter of James Talbot, 3rd Baron Talbot of Malahide. Their only daughter, Katherine Margaret Airey (d. 22 May 1896), married Sir Geers Cotterell, 3rd Baronet. Airey died at the house of Lord Wolseley, at Leatherhead, Surrey, causing his title to become extinct.

== Arms ==
Coat of arms of Richard Airey, 1st Baron Airey

Crest
Out of a mural crown Or a dexter and a sinister arm embowed in armour Proper the hands also Proper holding a cinquefoil Azure.
Escutcheon
Azure on a chevron Argent between in chief three mullets of the last and in base a mural crown Or three cinquefoils of the field.
Supporters
Dexter a horse Argent bridled Proper caparisoned Azure and Or gorged with a mural crown Gules sinister a lion Or gorged with a like mural crown.
Motto
Je Le Tiendrai

== Notes ==
Military offices
Preceded by Lord FitzRoy Somerset	Military Secretary; 1852–1854	Succeeded by Sir Charles Yorke
Preceded by The Lord de Ros	Quartermaster-General, Eastern Army; 1854–1855	Succeeded by Percy Egerton Herbert
Preceded by Sir James Freeth	Quartermaster-General to the Forces; 1855–1865	Succeeded by Sir James Grant
Government offices
Preceded by Sir William Codrington	Governor of Gibraltar; 1865–1870	Succeeded by Sir William Williams
Military offices
Preceded by Lord William Paulet	Adjutant General; 1870–1876	Succeeded by Sir Charles Ellice
Preceded by Sir Samuel Auchmuty	Colonel of the 7th (Royal Fusiliers) Regiment of Foot; 1868–1876	Succeeded by Sir Richard Wilbraham
Peerage of the United Kingdom
New creation	Baron Airey; 1876–1881	Extinct
