= Leesville, Virginia =

Unincorporated community in Virginia

Coordinates: 37°07′10″N 079°23′06″W

Leesville is an unincorporated community in Campbell County, in the U. S. state of Virginia.

== Geography ==
The town of Leesville is situated at the confluence of Goose Creek and the Staunton River, just below the lower dam of Leesville Lake.

== History ==
The town used to be a thriving regional hub in the late 19h century, having its own train station, post office, stores, and even a hotel. Its heyday was short-lived however as the automobile largely replaced train travel and the rail stop was relocated to "Lynch's", becoming Lynch Station, and then later relocated to Altavista, Virginia.

Mount Airy was listed on the National Register of Historic Places in 1990.

== Notable person ==
Leesville was the birthplace of baseball player Cloy Mattox.
