= 1916 Buffalo Bisons football team =

American college football season

1916 Buffalo Bisons football
- Conference: Independent
- Record: 3–5–2
- Head coach: Art Powell (1st season)
- Captain: H. M. Johnson
- Home stadium: International Park

1916 Eastern college football independents records
	Conf.			Overall
Team	W	L	T	W		L		T
Army		–		9	–	0	–	0
Pittsburgh		–		8	–	0	–	0
Brown		–		8	–	1	–	0
Colgate		–		8	–	1	–	0
Yale		–		8	–	1	–	0
Fordham		–		6	–	1	–	1
Swarthmore		–		6	–	1	–	1
Penn State		–		8	–	2	–	0
Washington & Jefferson		–		8	–	2	–	0
Boston College		–		6	–	2	–	0
Cornell		–		6	–	2	–	0
Princeton		–		6	–	2	–	0
Lehigh		–		6	–	2	–	1
Dartmouth		–		5	–	2	–	2
Harvard		–		7	–	3	–	0
Penn		–		7	–	3	–	1
Temple		–		3	–	1	–	2
Tufts		–		5	–	3	–	0
Carnegie Tech		–		4	–	3	–	0
Rutgers		–		3	–	2	–	2
NYU		–		4	–	3	–	1
Syracuse		–		5	–	4	–	0
Holy Cross		–		4	–	5	–	0
Vermont		–		4	–	5	–	0
Rhode Island State		–		3	–	4	–	1
New Hampshire		–		3	–	5	–	2
Geneva		–		2	–	5	–	2
Carlisle		–		1	–	3	–	1
Lafayette		–		2	–	6	–	1
Bucknell		–		3	–	9	–	0
Columbia		–		1	–	5	–	2
Franklin & Marshall		–		1	–	7	–	0
Villanova		–		1	–	8	–	0

The 1916 Buffalo Bisons football team represented the University of Buffalo as an independent during the 1916 college football season. Led by Art Powell in his first season as head coach, the team compiled a record of 3–5–2.

== Schedule ==
Date	Opponent	Site	Result	Source
September 20	at Pittsburgh	Forbes Field; Pittsburgh, PA	Cancelled	
October 7	at Allegheny	Meadville, PA	L 0–29	
October 14	Thiel	International Park; Buffalo, NY	W 9–7	
October 21	vs. Rochester	Alfred, NY	L 2–14	
October 28	at Geneva	Beaver Falls, PA	L 0–7	
November 4	Grove City	International Park; Buffalo, NY	T 0–0	
November 7	St. Bonaventure	International Park; Buffalo, NY	L 0–12	
November[ 11	at Hamilton	Clinton, NY	L 0–19	
November 18	at Westminster (PA)	New Wilmington, PA	W 7–0	
November 25	Detroit	International Park; Buffalo, NY	T 0–0	
November 30	Hobart	International Park; Buffalo, NY	W 6–0	
