= 1916 college football rankings =

- Season: 1916
- Bowl season: 1916–17 bowl games
- End of season champions: Pittsburgh

The 1916 college football season rankings included a ranking by The New York Times.

== The New York Times ==
In December 1916, The New York Times ranked Pittsburgh as football's top team in an end-of-year listing of champions in all sports.

Rank	Team	Record
1	Pittsburgh	8–0
2	Colgate	8-1
3	Brown	8–1
4	Yale	8–1
5	Army	9–0

== See also ==
- 1916 College Football All-America Team
