= Richard E. Eustis =

Playing career
- 1911–1913: Wesleyan
- Positions: Fullback, end

Coaching career (HC unless noted)
- 1914–1915: Wesleyan
- 1916: NYU

Head coaching record
- Overall: 14–10–2

Richard E. Eustis was an American college football player and coach. He played football at Wesleyan University from 1911 to 1913 and served as the university's head football coach from 1914 to 1915. He also served as the head football coach at New York University (NYU) in 1916.

== Playing career ==
Eustis was the son of New York Public Service Commissioner John E. Eustis of New York City. Eustis enrolled at Wesleyan University, where he played football as a fullback and end from 1911 to 1913. He was the captain of Wesleyan's 1913 football team. The New York Times described Eustis as "the mainstay on [Wesleyan's] football team for three years, playing full back and end with equal ability."

== Coaching career ==
In February 1914, while he was still a student, Eustis was hired as the new head football coach at Wesleyan. He served as Wesleyan's head football coach from 1914 to 1915 and compiled a record of 10–7–1. He graduated from Wesleyan in 1915. In 1916, Eustis was hired as the head football coach at New York University. In his only season as NYU's head coach, he compiled a record of 4–3–1. His brother, Elmer T. Eustis, was the assistant football coach on the 1914 NYU Violets team.

== Head coaching record ==
Year	Team	Overall	Conference	Standing	Bowl/playoffs
Wesleyan Methodists (Independent) (1914–1915)
1914	Wesleyan	4–4–1			
1915	Wesleyan	6–3			
Wesleyan:		10–7–1			
NYU Violets (Independent) (1916)
1916	NYU	4–3–1			
NYU:		4–3–1			
Total:		14–10–2			
