= 1916 Massachusetts Aggies football team =

American college football season

1916 Massachusetts Aggies football
- Conference: Athletic League of New England State Colleges
- Record: 2–4–2 ( Athletic League of New England State Colleges)
- Head coach: George Melican (1st season)
- Home stadium: Alumni Field

The 1916 Massachusetts Aggies football team represented Massachusetts Agricultural College in the 1916 college football season. The team was coached by George Melican and played its home games at Alumni Field in Amherst, Massachusetts.The 1916 season was Melican's only as head coach of the Aggies and the team's last season before disbanding during World War I. Massachusetts finished the season with a record of 2–4–2.

== Schedule ==
Date	Opponent	Site	Result	Source
October 7	Connecticut	Alumni Field; Amherst, MA (rivalry)	W 12–0	
October 14	at Dartmouth	Alumni Oval; Hanover, NH	L 0–62	
October 21	at Harvard	Harvard Stadium; Boston, MA	L 0–47	
October 28	Worcester Tech	Alumni Field; Amherst, MA	W 7–0	
November 4	at Tufts	Tufts Oval; Somerville, MA	L 0–28	
November 11	at Williams	Weston Field; Williamstown, MA	T 0–0	
November 18	at Cornell	Schoellkopf Field; Ithaca, NY	L 0–37	
November 25	at Springfield YMCA	Pratt Field; Springfield, MA	T 6–6	

Note: All scores/opponents sourced from Carlson 1988.
