= Edwin W. Leary =

American football and basketball coach

Biographical details
- Born: February 23, 1891; Ithaca, New York, U.S.
- Died: July 18, 1962 (aged 71); Auburn, New York
- Education: Colgate University (1914)

Playing career

Football
- 1913: Colgate

Coaching career (HC unless noted)

Football
- 1916: Vermont
- 1917–1919: 310th infantry
- 1920: Roanoke

Basketball
- 1920–1921: Roanoke

Head coaching record
- Overall: 5–10–3 (college football); 6–8 (college basketball)

Edwin Woodruff Leary (February 23, 1891 – July 18, 1962) was an American football and basketball coach. He served as the head football coach at the University of Vermont in 1916 and Roanoke College in 1920. Leary was also the head basketball coach at Roanoke for one season, in 1920–21, tallying a mark of 6–8.

He was a lawyer and city judge in Auburn, New York.

== Head coaching record ==
=== College football ===
Year	Team	Overall	Conference	Standing	Bowl/playoffs
Vermont Green and Gold (Independent) (1916)
1916	Vermont	4–5			
Vermont:		4–5			
Roanoke Maroons (Independent) (1920)
1920	Roanoke	1–5–3			
Roanoke:		1–5–3			
Total:		5–10–3			
