= 1916 Connecticut Aggies football team =

American college football season

1916 Connecticut Aggies football
- Conference: Athletic League of New England State Colleges
- Record: 1–7 (0–3 New England)
- Head coach: John F. Donahue (2nd season)
- Home stadium: Athletic Fields

The 1916 Connecticut Aggies football team represented Connecticut Agricultural College, now the University of Connecticut, in the 1916 college football season. The Aggies were led by second-year head coach John F. Donahue, and completed the season with a record of 1–7.

== Schedule ==
Date	Opponent	Site	Result	Source
September 23	at Holy Cross*	Fitton Field; Worcester, MA	L 0–7	
September 30	at Wesleyan*	Andrus Field; Middletown, CT	L 0–7	
October 7	at Massachusetts	Alumni Field; Amherst, MA (rivalry)	L 0–12	
October 21	at Vermont*	Centennial Fild; Burlington, VT	L 10–21	
October 28	at Rhode Island State	Kingston, RI (rivalry)	L 6–13 >	
November 4	New Hampshire	Athletic Fields; Storrs, CT	L 0–26	
November 11	at Stevens*	Hoboken, NJ	L 3–19	
November 18	Norwich*	Athletic Fields; Storrs, CT	W 17–7	
*Non-conference game
