= 1916 Maine Black Bears football team =

American college football season

1916 Maine Black Bears football
- Conference: Maine Intercollegiate Athletic Association
- Record: 0–4–3 (0–1–2 MIAA)
- Head coach: Tommy Hughitt (2nd season)
- Captain: William Gorham
- Home stadium: Alumni Field

The 1916 Maine Black Bears football team was an American football team that represented the University of Maine during the 1916 college football season. The team compiled a 0–4–3 record. Tommy Hughitt was the head coach for the second year, and William Gorham was the team captain.

== Schedule ==
| Date | Opponent | Site | Result | Source |
|---|---|---|---|---|
| September 30 | New Hampshire* | Alumni Field; Orono, ME (rivalry) | T 0–0 | |
| October 7 | at Colgate* | Utica, NY | L 0–28 | |
| October 14 | Rhode Island State | Alumni Field; Orono, ME | L 0–13 | |
| October 21 | at Bates | Garcelon Field; Lewiston, ME | L 0–6 | |
| October 28 | at Colby | Seaverns Field; Waterville, ME | T 0–0 | |
| November 4 | Bowdoin | Alumni Field; Orono, ME | T 7–7 | |
| November 11 | at Army* | The Plain; West Point, NY | L 3–17 | |
*Non-conference game
