= 1916 Geneva Covenanters football team =

American college football season

1916 Geneva Covenanters football
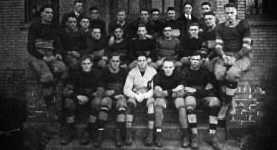
- Conference: Independent
- Record: 2–5–2
- Head coach: C. Brainerd Metheny (4th season)

1916 Eastern college football independents records
	Conf.			Overall
Team	W	L	T	W		L		T
Army		–		9	–	0	–	0
Pittsburgh		–		8	–	0	–	0
Brown		–		8	–	1	–	0
Colgate		–		8	–	1	–	0
Yale		–		8	–	1	–	0
Fordham		–		6	–	1	–	1
Swarthmore		–		6	–	1	–	1
Penn State		–		8	–	2	–	0
Washington & Jefferson		–		8	–	2	–	0
Boston College		–		6	–	2	–	0
Cornell		–		6	–	2	–	0
Princeton		–		6	–	2	–	0
Lehigh		–		6	–	2	–	1
Dartmouth		–		5	–	2	–	2
Harvard		–		7	–	3	–	0
Penn		–		7	–	3	–	1
Temple		–		3	–	1	–	2
Tufts		–		5	–	3	–	0
Carnegie Tech		–		4	–	3	–	0
Rutgers		–		3	–	2	–	2
NYU		–		4	–	3	–	1
Syracuse		–		5	–	4	–	0
Holy Cross		–		4	–	5	–	0
Vermont		–		4	–	5	–	0
Rhode Island State		–		3	–	4	–	1
New Hampshire		–		3	–	5	–	2
Geneva		–		2	–	5	–	2
Carlisle		–		1	–	3	–	1
Lafayette		–		2	–	6	–	1
Bucknell		–		3	–	9	–	0
Columbia		–		1	–	5	–	2
Franklin & Marshall		–		1	–	7	–	0
Villanova		–		1	–	8	–	0

The 1916 Geneva Covenanters football team was an American football team that represented Geneva College as an independent during the 1916 college football season. Led by C. Brainerd Metheny in his fourth and final year ad head coach, the team compiled a record of 2–5–2.

== Schedule ==
Date	Opponent	Site	Result	Source
September 30	at Washington & Jefferson	Washington, PA	L 0–53	
October 7	St. Bonaventure	Beaver Falls, PA	L 7–9	
October 14	Allegheny	Beaver Falls, PA	L 0–6	
October 21	Thiel	Beaver Falls, PA	T 0–0	
October 28	Buffalo	Beaver Falls, PA	W 7–0	
November 4	at Penn State	New Beaver Field; State College, PA	L 0–79	
November 11	Westminster (PA)	Beaver Falls, PA	T 14–14	
November 18	at Grove City	Grove City, PA	L 0–31	
November 25	Bethany (WV)	Beaver Falls, PA	W 7–0	
