= Harold White (American football) =

American football player (1894–1973)

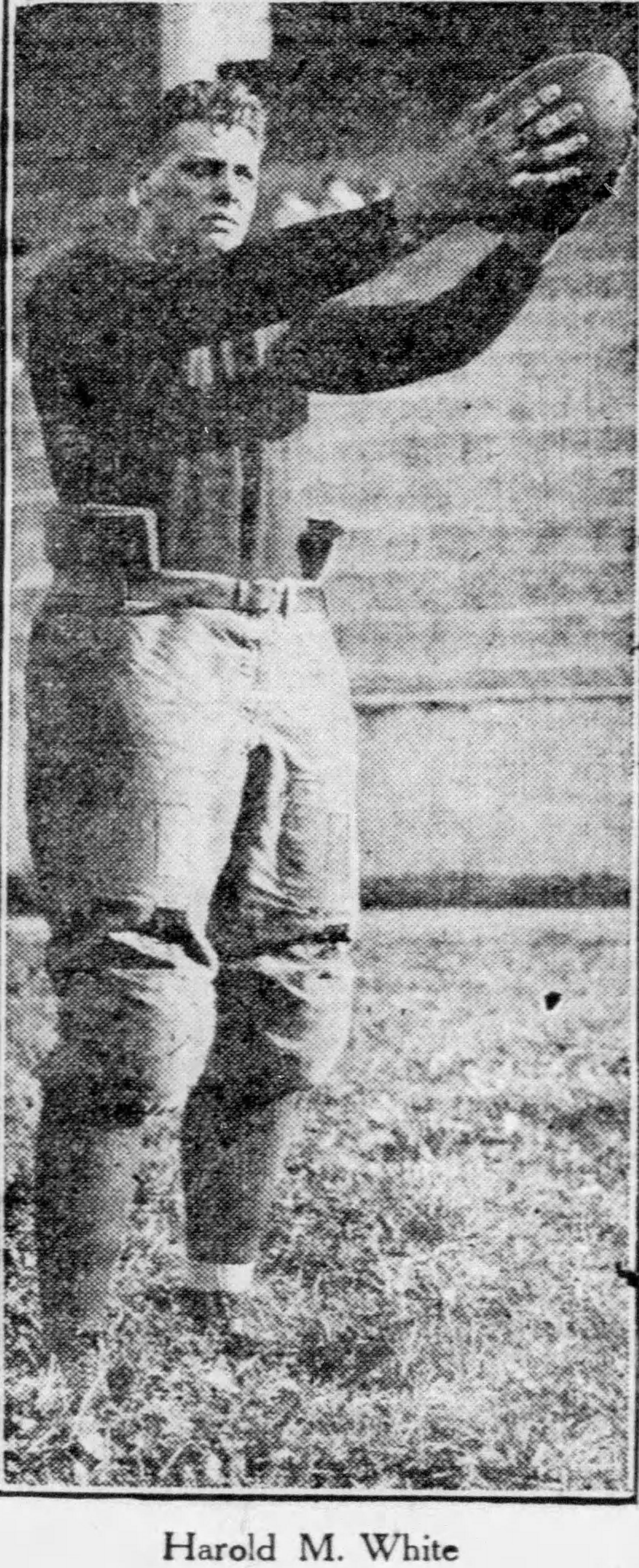

Syracuse Orangemen
- Position: Guard

Personal information
- Born: March 22, 1893; New York, New York, U.S.
- Died: May 4, 1973 (aged 80); Thomasville, Georgia
- Listed height: 6 ft 6 in (1.98 m)
- Listed weight: 273 lb (124 kg)

Career information
- High school: DeWitt Clinton
- College: Syracuse (1913–1916)

Awards and highlights
- Consensus All-American (1915)

Harold M. "Babe" White (March 22, 1894 – May 4, 1973) was an All-American football player, Olympic athlete, wartime intelligence agent, and big game hunter.

== Early life ==
White was born in New York City in 1894. He attended DeWitt Clinton High School in The Bronx.

== Syracuse ==
White attended the University of Wisconsin later Syracuse University. He competed in the discus and shotput at the 1912 Summer Olympics. played college football for Syracuse University. He played at the guard position for Syracuse from 1913 to 1916. At 6 feet, 6 inches in height and 273 pounds, White was the largest American football player of his time. He was selected as a first-team All-American in 1915. He was also selected as the captain of the 1916 Syracuse football team.

== Later life ==
White served as an Army intelligence officer in both World War I and World War II. He was also a big-game hunter who killed animals, including tigers and elephants, in India and Africa and then donated the preserved remains to the Field Museum in Chicago and that Smithsonian Institution in Washington, D.C. He was reported to be the first American to visit Nepal and a friend of Haile Selassie.

He lived in Thomasville, Georgia, starting in 1923. He died at the Archbold Memorial Hosepital in Thomasville after an extended illness in 1973 at age 79.
