= 1916 Washington & Jefferson Red and Black football team =

American college football season

1916 Washington & Jefferson Red and Black football
- Conference: Independent
- Record: 8–2
- Head coach: Sol Metzger (1st season)

1916 Eastern college football independents records
| | Conf. | | | Overall |
| Team | W | L | T | W | | L | | T |
|---|---|---|---|---|---|---|---|---|
| Army | | – | | 9 | – | 0 | – | 0 |
| Pittsburgh | | – | | 8 | – | 0 | – | 0 |
| Brown | | – | | 8 | – | 1 | – | 0 |
| Colgate | | – | | 8 | – | 1 | – | 0 |
| Yale | | – | | 8 | – | 1 | – | 0 |
| Fordham | | – | | 6 | – | 1 | – | 1 |
| Swarthmore | | – | | 6 | – | 1 | – | 1 |
| Penn State | | – | | 8 | – | 2 | – | 0 |
| Washington & Jefferson | | – | | 8 | – | 2 | – | 0 |
| Boston College | | – | | 6 | – | 2 | – | 0 |
| Cornell | | – | | 6 | – | 2 | – | 0 |
| Princeton | | – | | 6 | – | 2 | – | 0 |
| Lehigh | | – | | 6 | – | 2 | – | 1 |
| Dartmouth | | – | | 5 | – | 2 | – | 2 |
| Harvard | | – | | 7 | – | 3 | – | 0 |
| Penn | | – | | 7 | – | 3 | – | 1 |
| Temple | | – | | 3 | – | 1 | – | 2 |
| Tufts | | – | | 5 | – | 3 | – | 0 |
| Carnegie Tech | | – | | 4 | – | 3 | – | 0 |
| Rutgers | | – | | 3 | – | 2 | – | 2 |
| NYU | | – | | 4 | – | 3 | – | 1 |
| Syracuse | | – | | 5 | – | 4 | – | 0 |
| Holy Cross | | – | | 4 | – | 5 | – | 0 |
| Vermont | | – | | 4 | – | 5 | – | 0 |
| Rhode Island State | | – | | 3 | – | 4 | – | 1 |
| New Hampshire | | – | | 3 | – | 5 | – | 2 |
| Geneva | | – | | 2 | – | 5 | – | 2 |
| Carlisle | | – | | 1 | – | 3 | – | 1 |
| Lafayette | | – | | 2 | – | 6 | – | 1 |
| Bucknell | | – | | 3 | – | 9 | – | 0 |
| Columbia | | – | | 1 | – | 5 | – | 2 |
| Franklin & Marshall | | – | | 1 | – | 7 | – | 0 |
| Villanova | | – | | 1 | – | 8 | – | 0 |

The 1916 Washington & Jefferson Red and Black football team represented Washington & Jefferson College as an independent during the 1916 college football season. Led by first-year head Sol Metzger, Washington & Jefferson compiled a record of 10–0–1.

== Schedule ==
| Date | Time | Opponent | Site | Result | Attendance | Source |
|---|---|---|---|---|---|---|
| September 23 | | Bethany (WV) | Washington, PA | W 37–6 | | |
| September 30 | | Geneva | Washington, PA | W 53–0 | | |
| October 7 | | West Virginia Wesleyan | Washington, PA | W 21–0 | | |
| October 14 | | Marietta | Washington, PA | W 47–6 | | |
| October 21 | | Westminster (PA) | Washington, PA | W 12–0 | | |
| October 28 | | at Yale | Yale Bowl; New Haven, CT | L 14–36 | | |
| November 11 | 2:30 p.m. | at Pittsburgh | Forbes Field; Pittsburgh, PA | L 0–37 | 25,000 | |
| November 18 | | vs. Washington and Lee | Broad Street Park; Richmond, VA | W 10–6 | | |
| November 25 | | Chattanooga | Washington, PA | W 41–0 | | |
| November 30 | | vs. Rutgers | Polo Grounds; New York, NY | W 12–9 | | |
