= 1916 Rhode Island State football team =

American college football season

1916 Rhode Island State football
- Conference: Independent
- Record: 3–4–1
- Head coach: James A. Baldwin (2nd season)

1916 Eastern college football independents records
| | Conf. | | | Overall |
| Team | W | L | T | W | | L | | T |
|---|---|---|---|---|---|---|---|---|
| Army | | – | | 9 | – | 0 | – | 0 |
| Pittsburgh | | – | | 8 | – | 0 | – | 0 |
| Brown | | – | | 8 | – | 1 | – | 0 |
| Colgate | | – | | 8 | – | 1 | – | 0 |
| Yale | | – | | 8 | – | 1 | – | 0 |
| Fordham | | – | | 6 | – | 1 | – | 1 |
| Swarthmore | | – | | 6 | – | 1 | – | 1 |
| Penn State | | – | | 8 | – | 2 | – | 0 |
| Washington & Jefferson | | – | | 8 | – | 2 | – | 0 |
| Boston College | | – | | 6 | – | 2 | – | 0 |
| Cornell | | – | | 6 | – | 2 | – | 0 |
| Princeton | | – | | 6 | – | 2 | – | 0 |
| Lehigh | | – | | 6 | – | 2 | – | 1 |
| Dartmouth | | – | | 5 | – | 2 | – | 2 |
| Harvard | | – | | 7 | – | 3 | – | 0 |
| Penn | | – | | 7 | – | 3 | – | 1 |
| Temple | | – | | 3 | – | 1 | – | 2 |
| Tufts | | – | | 5 | – | 3 | – | 0 |
| Carnegie Tech | | – | | 4 | – | 3 | – | 0 |
| Rutgers | | – | | 3 | – | 2 | – | 2 |
| NYU | | – | | 4 | – | 3 | – | 1 |
| Syracuse | | – | | 5 | – | 4 | – | 0 |
| Holy Cross | | – | | 4 | – | 5 | – | 0 |
| Vermont | | – | | 4 | – | 5 | – | 0 |
| Rhode Island State | | – | | 3 | – | 4 | – | 1 |
| New Hampshire | | – | | 3 | – | 5 | – | 2 |
| Geneva | | – | | 2 | – | 5 | – | 2 |
| Carlisle | | – | | 1 | – | 3 | – | 1 |
| Lafayette | | – | | 2 | – | 6 | – | 1 |
| Bucknell | | – | | 3 | – | 9 | – | 0 |
| Columbia | | – | | 1 | – | 5 | – | 2 |
| Franklin & Marshall | | – | | 1 | – | 7 | – | 0 |
| Villanova | | – | | 1 | – | 8 | – | 0 |

The 1916 Rhode Island State football team was an American football team that represented Rhode Island State College (later renamed the University of Rhode Island) as an independent during the 1916 college football season. In its second year under head coach James A. Baldwin, the team compiled a 3–4–1 record.

== Schedule ==
| Date | Time | Opponent | Site | Result | Source |
|---|---|---|---|---|---|
| September 23 | | Fort Adams | Kingston, RI | W 69–0 | |
| September 30 | | at Brown | Andrews Field; Providence, RI (rivalry) | L 0–18 | |
| October 7 | | at Wesleyan | Middletown, CT | T 3–3 | |
| October 14 | | at Maine | Orono, ME | W 13–0 | |
| October 21 | | at Colgate | Hamilton, NY | L 0–33 | |
| October 28 | | Connecticut | Kingston, RI (rivalry) | W 13–6 | |
| November 4 | 2:30 p.m. | at Boston College | Alumni Field; Chestnut Hill, MA | L 0–39 | |
| November 18 | | at New Hampshire | Durham, NH | L 0–12 | |
