= 1916 Harvard Crimson football team =

American college football season

1916 Harvard Crimson football
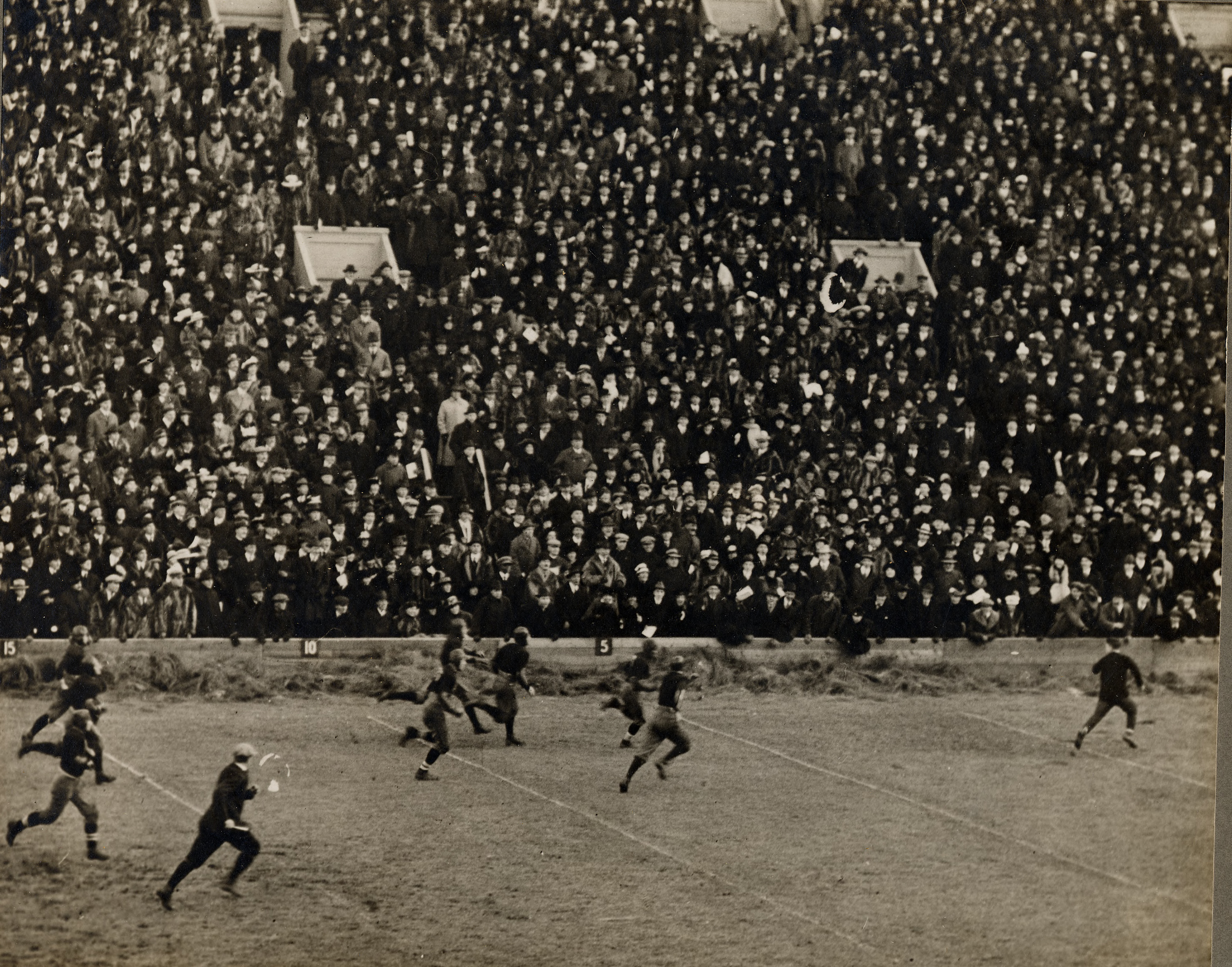
- Harvard–Brown football game of 1916
- Conference: Independent
- Record: 7–3
- Head coach: Percy Haughton (9th season)
- Home stadium: Harvard Stadium

1916 Eastern college football independents records
| | Conf. | | | Overall |
| Team | W | L | T | W | | L | | T |
|---|---|---|---|---|---|---|---|---|
| Army | | – | | 9 | – | 0 | – | 0 |
| Pittsburgh | | – | | 8 | – | 0 | – | 0 |
| Brown | | – | | 8 | – | 1 | – | 0 |
| Colgate | | – | | 8 | – | 1 | – | 0 |
| Yale | | – | | 8 | – | 1 | – | 0 |
| Fordham | | – | | 6 | – | 1 | – | 1 |
| Swarthmore | | – | | 6 | – | 1 | – | 1 |
| Penn State | | – | | 8 | – | 2 | – | 0 |
| Washington & Jefferson | | – | | 8 | – | 2 | – | 0 |
| Boston College | | – | | 6 | – | 2 | – | 0 |
| Cornell | | – | | 6 | – | 2 | – | 0 |
| Princeton | | – | | 6 | – | 2 | – | 0 |
| Lehigh | | – | | 6 | – | 2 | – | 1 |
| Dartmouth | | – | | 5 | – | 2 | – | 2 |
| Harvard | | – | | 7 | – | 3 | – | 0 |
| Penn | | – | | 7 | – | 3 | – | 1 |
| Temple | | – | | 3 | – | 1 | – | 2 |
| Tufts | | – | | 5 | – | 3 | – | 0 |
| Carnegie Tech | | – | | 4 | – | 3 | – | 0 |
| Rutgers | | – | | 3 | – | 2 | – | 2 |
| NYU | | – | | 4 | – | 3 | – | 1 |
| Syracuse | | – | | 5 | – | 4 | – | 0 |
| Holy Cross | | – | | 4 | – | 5 | – | 0 |
| Vermont | | – | | 4 | – | 5 | – | 0 |
| Rhode Island State | | – | | 3 | – | 4 | – | 1 |
| New Hampshire | | – | | 3 | – | 5 | – | 2 |
| Geneva | | – | | 2 | – | 5 | – | 2 |
| Carlisle | | – | | 1 | – | 3 | – | 1 |
| Lafayette | | – | | 2 | – | 6 | – | 1 |
| Bucknell | | – | | 3 | – | 9 | – | 0 |
| Columbia | | – | | 1 | – | 5 | – | 2 |
| Franklin & Marshall | | – | | 1 | – | 7 | – | 0 |
| Villanova | | – | | 1 | – | 8 | – | 0 |

The 1916 Harvard Crimson football team represented Harvard University in the 1916 college football season. The Crimson finished with a 7–3 record under ninth-year head coach Percy Haughton. Walter Camp selected only one Harvard player, guard Harrie Dadmun, as a first-team member of his 1916 College Football All-America Team.

== Schedule ==
| Date | Opponent | Site | Result | Source |
|---|---|---|---|---|
| September 23 | Colby | Harvard Stadium; Boston, MA | W 10–0 | |
| September 30 | Bates | Harvard Stadium; Boston, MA | W 26–0 | |
| October 7 | Tufts | Harvard Stadium; Boston, MA | L 3–7 | |
| October 14 | North Carolina | Harvard Stadium; Boston, MA | W 21–0 | |
| October 21 | Massachusetts | Harvard Stadium; Boston, MA | W 47–0 | |
| October 28 | Cornell | Harvard Stadium; Boston, MA | W 23–0 | |
| November 4 | Virginia | Harvard Stadium; Boston, MA | W 51–0 | |
| November 11 | Princeton | Harvard Stadium; Boston, MA (rivalry) | W 3–0 | |
| November 18 | Brown | Harvard Stadium; Boston, MA | L 0–21 | |
| November 25 | at Yale | Yale Bowl; New Haven, CT (rivalry) | L 3–6 | |
