= 1916 Syracuse Orangemen football team =

American college football season

1916 Syracuse Orangemen football
- Conference: Independent
- Record: 5–4
- Head coach: Bill Hollenback (1st season)
- Captain: Harold White
- Home stadium: Archbold Stadium

1916 Eastern college football independents records
	Conf.			Overall
Team	W	L	T	W		L		T
Army		–		9	–	0	–	0
Pittsburgh		–		8	–	0	–	0
Brown		–		8	–	1	–	0
Colgate		–		8	–	1	–	0
Yale		–		8	–	1	–	0
Fordham		–		6	–	1	–	1
Swarthmore		–		6	–	1	–	1
Penn State		–		8	–	2	–	0
Washington & Jefferson		–		8	–	2	–	0
Boston College		–		6	–	2	–	0
Cornell		–		6	–	2	–	0
Princeton		–		6	–	2	–	0
Lehigh		–		6	–	2	–	1
Dartmouth		–		5	–	2	–	2
Harvard		–		7	–	3	–	0
Penn		–		7	–	3	–	1
Temple		–		3	–	1	–	2
Tufts		–		5	–	3	–	0
Carnegie Tech		–		4	–	3	–	0
Rutgers		–		3	–	2	–	2
NYU		–		4	–	3	–	1
Syracuse		–		5	–	4	–	0
Holy Cross		–		4	–	5	–	0
Vermont		–		4	–	5	–	0
Rhode Island State		–		3	–	4	–	1
New Hampshire		–		3	–	5	–	2
Geneva		–		2	–	5	–	2
Carlisle		–		1	–	3	–	1
Lafayette		–		2	–	6	–	1
Bucknell		–		3	–	9	–	0
Columbia		–		1	–	5	–	2
Franklin & Marshall		–		1	–	7	–	0
Villanova		–		1	–	8	–	0

The 1916 Syracuse Orangemen football team represented Syracuse University as an independent during the 1916 college football season. Led by Bill Hollenback in his first and only season as head coach, the Orangemen compiled a record of 5–4.

== Schedule ==
Date	Opponent	Site	Result	Attendance	Source
September 30	All-Syracuse	Archbold Stadium; Syracuse, NY	W 57–0		
October 7	Ohio	Archbold Stadium; Syracuse, NY	W 73–0		
October 14	Franklin & Marshall	Archbold Stadium; Syracuse, NY	W 60–0	5,000	
October 21	Pittsburgh	Archbold Stadium; Syracuse, NY (rivalry)	L 0–30	10,000–15,000	
October 28	Michigan	Archbold Stadium; Syracuse, NY	L 13–14		
November 4	vs. Dartmouth	Exposition Grounds; Springfield, MA	L 10–15	12,000–13,000	
November 11	Susquehanna	Archbold Stadium; Syracuse, NY	W 42–0		
November 18	Colgate	Archbold Stadium; Syracuse, NY (rivalry)	L 0–15	16,000	
November 25	vs. Tufts	Fenway Park; Boston, MA	W 20–13		
