= 1916 Holy Cross football team =

American college football season

1916 Holy Cross football
- Conference: Independent
- Record: 4–5
- Head coach: Luke Kelly (3rd season)
- Captain: Raymond Lynch
- Home stadium: Fitton Field

1916 Eastern college football independents records
	Conf.			Overall
Team	W	L	T	W		L		T
Army		–		9	–	0	–	0
Pittsburgh		–		8	–	0	–	0
Brown		–		8	–	1	–	0
Colgate		–		8	–	1	–	0
Yale		–		8	–	1	–	0
Fordham		–		6	–	1	–	1
Swarthmore		–		6	–	1	–	1
Penn State		–		8	–	2	–	0
Washington & Jefferson		–		8	–	2	–	0
Boston College		–		6	–	2	–	0
Cornell		–		6	–	2	–	0
Princeton		–		6	–	2	–	0
Lehigh		–		6	–	2	–	1
Dartmouth		–		5	–	2	–	2
Harvard		–		7	–	3	–	0
Penn		–		7	–	3	–	1
Temple		–		3	–	1	–	2
Tufts		–		5	–	3	–	0
Carnegie Tech		–		4	–	3	–	0
Rutgers		–		3	–	2	–	2
NYU		–		4	–	3	–	1
Syracuse		–		5	–	4	–	0
Holy Cross		–		4	–	5	–	0
Vermont		–		4	–	5	–	0
Rhode Island State		–		3	–	4	–	1
New Hampshire		–		3	–	5	–	2
Geneva		–		2	–	5	–	2
Carlisle		–		1	–	3	–	1
Lafayette		–		2	–	6	–	1
Bucknell		–		3	–	9	–	0
Columbia		–		1	–	5	–	2
Franklin & Marshall		–		1	–	7	–	0
Villanova		–		1	–	8	–	0

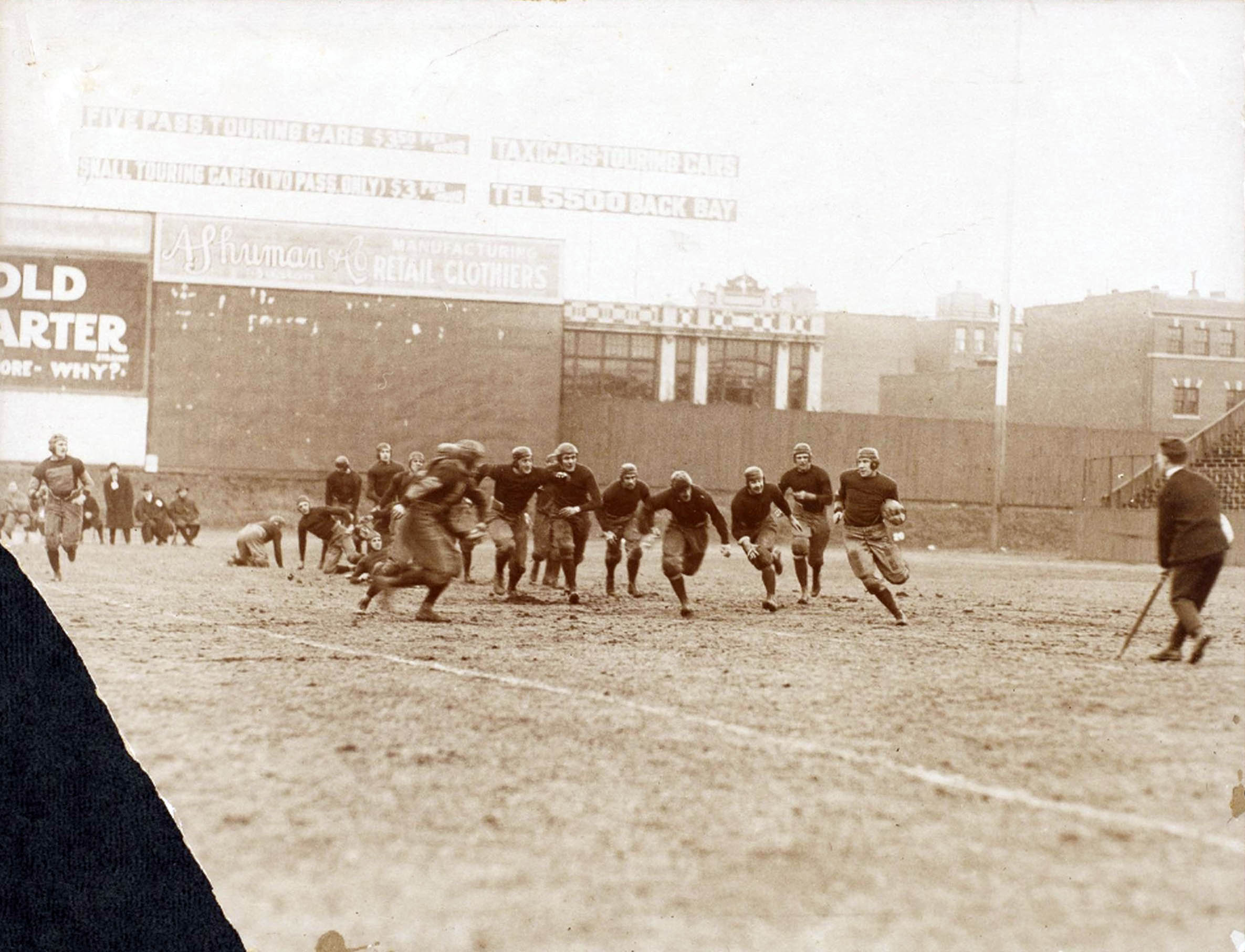
Holy Cross takes on Boston College in 1916 at Fenway Park.

The 1916 Holy Cross football team was an American football team that represented the College of the Holy Cross in the 1916 college football season.

In its third year under head coach Luke Kelly, the team compiled a 4–5 record. Raymond Lynch was the team captain. He replaced captain-elect Mark Devlin, who withdrew from the school before the season began.

Holy Cross played its home games at Fitton Field on the college campus in Worcester, Massachusetts.

== Schedule ==
Date	Opponent	Site	Result	Attendance	Source
September 23	Connecticut	Fitton Field; Worcester, MA	W 7–0		
September 30	Princeton	Fitton Field; Worcester, MA	L 0–21	6,000	
October 7	Bates	Fitton Field; Worcester, MA	W 3–0		
October 14	at Army	The Plain; West Point, NY	L 0–17		
November 4	vs. Rutgers	Weidenmayer's Park; Newark, NJ	L 6–14	3,000	
November 11	at Bowdoin	Bayside Park; Portland, ME	W 19–10	2,500	
November 18	Fordham	Fitton Field; Worcester, MA (rivalry)	L 0–40	1,500	
November 25	at Worcester Polytechnic	Alumni Field; Worcester, MA	W 9–6		
December 2^	at Boston College	Fenway Park; Boston, MA (rivalry)	L 14–17	8,000	
^ rescheduled from November 30 due to inclement weather
