= 1916 Fordham Maroon football team =

American college football season

1916 Fordham Maroon football
- Conference: Independent
- Record: 25–1–1 / 6–1–1
- Head coach: Frank Gargan (1st season)
- Captain: James Butler
- Home stadium: Fordham Field

1916 Eastern college football independents records
	Conf.			Overall
Team	W	L	T	W		L		T
Army		–		9	–	0	–	0
Pittsburgh		–		8	–	0	–	0
Brown		–		8	–	1	–	0
Colgate		–		8	–	1	–	0
Yale		–		8	–	1	–	0
Fordham		–		6	–	1	–	1
Swarthmore		–		6	–	1	–	1
Penn State		–		8	–	2	–	0
Washington & Jefferson		–		8	–	2	–	0
Boston College		–		6	–	2	–	0
Cornell		–		6	–	2	–	0
Princeton		–		6	–	2	–	0
Lehigh		–		6	–	2	–	1
Dartmouth		–		5	–	2	–	2
Harvard		–		7	–	3	–	0
Penn		–		7	–	3	–	1
Temple		–		3	–	1	–	2
Tufts		–		5	–	3	–	0
Carnegie Tech		–		4	–	3	–	0
Rutgers		–		3	–	2	–	2
NYU		–		4	–	3	–	1
Syracuse		–		5	–	4	–	0
Holy Cross		–		4	–	5	–	0
Vermont		–		4	–	5	–	0
Rhode Island State		–		3	–	4	–	1
New Hampshire		–		3	–	5	–	2
Geneva		–		2	–	5	–	2
Carlisle		–		1	–	3	–	1
Lafayette		–		2	–	6	–	1
Bucknell		–		3	–	9	–	0
Columbia		–		1	–	5	–	2
Franklin & Marshall		–		1	–	7	–	0
Villanova		–		1	–	8	–	0

The 1916 Fordham Maroon football team was an American football team that represented Fordham University as an independent during the 1916 college football season. Under first-year head coach Frank Gargan, Fordham claims a 25–1–1 record. College Football Data Warehouse (CFDW) lists the team's record at 6–1–1.

== Schedule ==
Date	Opponent	Site	Result	Attendance	Source
September 30	at Lafayette	March Field; Easton, PA	T 0–0		
October 7	Western Maryland	Fordham Field; Bronx, NY	W 20–0		
October 12	Boston College	Fordham Field; Bronx, NY	W (forfeit?)		
October 12	USS Texas	Fordham Field; Bronx, NY	W 22–0	3,000	
October 21	Susquehanna	Fordham Field; Bronx, NY	W 47–0		
October 28	Pennsylvania Military	Fordham Field; Bronx, NY	W (forfeit?)		
November 1	USS Wyoming	Fordham Field; Bronx, NY	W 24–0 (practice game)		
November 7	Georgetown	Fordham Field; Bronx, NY	L 0–13	10,000	
November 15	USS Arkansas	Fordham Field; Bronx, NY	W 30–0 (practice game)		
November 18	at Holy Cross	Fitton Field; Worcester, MA (rivalry)	W 40–0	1,500	
November 25	Gallaudet	Fordham Field; Bronx, NY	W 68–0		
November 30	Villanova	Fordham Field; Bronx, NY	W 14–7		
	US Training Station, Bayshore		W 13–6		
	Mitchell Field Aviators		W 12–6		
	Pelham Bay Naval Reserve		W 24–0		
	USS Wyoming		W 20–10		
	USS Arkansas		W 14–10		
	Fordham reserves		W 18–0		
	Fordham reserves		W 14–0		
	Fordham reserves		W 10–7		
	NYU		W		
	St. Joseph's		W		
	Fordham Prep		W 20–16		
	Fordham Prep		W 20–10		
	St. Peter's		W 10–0		
	Columbia freshmen		W 30–0		
	NYU		W 12–0		
