= 1916 Lafayette football team =

American football club

1916 Lafayette football
- Conference: Independent
- Record: 2–6–1
- Head coach: Wilmer G. Crowell (3rd season)
- Captain: Paul Taylor
- Home stadium: March Field

1916 Eastern college football independents records
	Conf.			Overall
Team	W	L	T	W		L		T
Army		–		9	–	0	–	0
Pittsburgh		–		8	–	0	–	0
Brown		–		8	–	1	–	0
Colgate		–		8	–	1	–	0
Yale		–		8	–	1	–	0
Fordham		–		6	–	1	–	1
Swarthmore		–		6	–	1	–	1
Penn State		–		8	–	2	–	0
Washington & Jefferson		–		8	–	2	–	0
Boston College		–		6	–	2	–	0
Cornell		–		6	–	2	–	0
Princeton		–		6	–	2	–	0
Lehigh		–		6	–	2	–	1
Dartmouth		–		5	–	2	–	2
Harvard		–		7	–	3	–	0
Penn		–		7	–	3	–	1
Temple		–		3	–	1	–	2
Tufts		–		5	–	3	–	0
Carnegie Tech		–		4	–	3	–	0
Rutgers		–		3	–	2	–	2
NYU		–		4	–	3	–	1
Syracuse		–		5	–	4	–	0
Holy Cross		–		4	–	5	–	0
Vermont		–		4	–	5	–	0
Rhode Island State		–		3	–	4	–	1
New Hampshire		–		3	–	5	–	2
Geneva		–		2	–	5	–	2
Carlisle		–		1	–	3	–	1
Lafayette		–		2	–	6	–	1
Bucknell		–		3	–	9	–	0
Columbia		–		1	–	5	–	2
Franklin & Marshall		–		1	–	7	–	0
Villanova		–		1	–	8	–	0

The 1916 Lafayette football team was an American football team that represented Lafayette College as an independent during the 1916 college football season. In its third and final season under head coach Wilmer G. Crowell, the team compiled a 2–6–1 record. Paul Taylor was the team captain. The team played its home games at March Field in Easton, Pennsylvania.

== Schedule ==
Date	Opponent	Site	Result	Source
September 30	Fordham	March Field; Easton, PA	T 0–0	
October 7	Swarthmore	March Field; Easton, PA	L 6–10	
October 14	Ursinus	March Field; Easton, PA	L 0–6	
October 21	at Princeton	Palmer Stadium; Princeton, NJ	L 0–33	
October 28	Lebanon Valley	March Field; Easton, PA	W 27–14	
November 4	at Penn	Franklin Field; Philadelphia, PA	L 0–19	
November 11	Albright	March Field; Easton, PA	W 32–0	
November 17	at Penn State	New Beaver Field; State College, PA	L 0–40	
November 25	Lehigh	March Field; Easton, PA (rivalry)	L 0–16	
