= 1916 Villanova Wildcats football team =

American college football season

1916 Villanova Wildcats football
- Conference: Independent
- Record: 1–8
- Head coach: Edward Bennis (1st season)
- Captain: F. Leo Lynch
- Home stadium: None

1916 Eastern college football independents records
	Conf.			Overall
Team	W	L	T	W		L		T
Army		–		9	–	0	–	0
Pittsburgh		–		8	–	0	–	0
Brown		–		8	–	1	–	0
Colgate		–		8	–	1	–	0
Yale		–		8	–	1	–	0
Fordham		–		6	–	1	–	1
Swarthmore		–		6	–	1	–	1
Penn State		–		8	–	2	–	0
Washington & Jefferson		–		8	–	2	–	0
Boston College		–		6	–	2	–	0
Cornell		–		6	–	2	–	0
Princeton		–		6	–	2	–	0
Lehigh		–		6	–	2	–	1
Dartmouth		–		5	–	2	–	2
Harvard		–		7	–	3	–	0
Penn		–		7	–	3	–	1
Temple		–		3	–	1	–	2
Tufts		–		5	–	3	–	0
Carnegie Tech		–		4	–	3	–	0
Rutgers		–		3	–	2	–	2
NYU		–		4	–	3	–	1
Syracuse		–		5	–	4	–	0
Holy Cross		–		4	–	5	–	0
Vermont		–		4	–	5	–	0
Rhode Island State		–		3	–	4	–	1
New Hampshire		–		3	–	5	–	2
Geneva		–		2	–	5	–	2
Carlisle		–		1	–	3	–	1
Lafayette		–		2	–	6	–	1
Bucknell		–		3	–	9	–	0
Columbia		–		1	–	5	–	2
Franklin & Marshall		–		1	–	7	–	0
Villanova		–		1	–	8	–	0

The 1916 Villanova Wildcats football team represented the Villanova University during the 1916 college football season. The Wildcats team captain was F. Leo Lynch.

== Schedule ==
Date	Opponent	Site	Result	Source
September 30	at Rutgers	Neilson Field; New Brunswick, NJ	L 0–33	
October 7	at Catholic University	Washington, DC	W 3–0	
October 14	at Lebanon Valley	Lebanon, PA	L 3–13	
October 18	Catholic University	Villanova, PA	L 7–21	
October 28	at Army	The Plain; West Point, NY	L 7–69	
	American Chain Company	?	L 7–19	
November 11	at Gettysburg	Gettysburg, PA	L 3–27	
November 18	at Navy	Worden Field; Annapolis, MD	L 7–57	
November 30	at Fordham	Fordham Field; Bronx, NY	L 7–14	
