= Clinton Black =

American football player (1894–1963)

Cupid Black
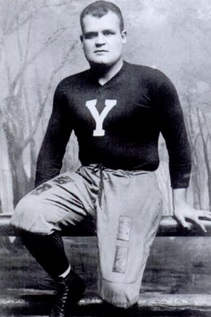

Profile
- Position: Guard

Personal information
- Born: New York, New York, U.S.

Career history
- 1914–1917: Yale

Awards and highlights
- Consensus All-American (1916); Second-team All-American (1915); First-team All-Service (1917)

Other information
- Military career
- Allegiance: United States
- Branch: U.S. Navy
- Service years: 1918–1919
- Unit: USS President Lincoln
- Conflicts: World War I

Clinton Rutherford "Cupe" Black Jr. (October 3, 1894 – October 8, 1963) was an American football player.

Black enrolled at Yale University and, while there, played on the Yale Bulldogs football team. He was captain of the 1916 Yale Bulldogs and a consensus first-team choice for the 1916 College Football All-America Team. He wore No. 1 that year, the first time Yale donned numbers. In 1920 Black was rumoured to restart the Massillon Tigers pro football team, and enter the team in the newly formed American Professional Football Association (later renamed the National Football League in 1922), however he later turned down the offer.

== World War I ==
Black served in the United States Navy during World War I. During the war his ship the USS President Lincoln was hit by a torpedo launched from a German U-boat. While the Lincoln sank, Black made it into a lifeboat. Soon the U-boat surfaced and circled the life rafts. The sub's captain claimed to be a Yale alumnus who recognized Black and spoke with him. The sub later left the men to their lifeboats. They were all later rescued by the USS Warrington and transported to France. A previous report of the incident had the captain as a Harvard graduate, who took Black on board and set the sub's course for Germany.

After the war, he became a member of the Chicago Board of Trade and thereafter went into the insurance business. He was the founder, chairman, and chief executive officer of C. R. Black Jr. Corporation, an insurance brokerage business in New York City. He was married and had two sons and a daughter. He died in 1963, aged 78 at St. Luke's Hospital in Manhattan.
