= 1916 NYU Violets football team =

American college football season

1916 NYU Violets football
- Conference: Independent
- Record: 4–3–1
- Head coach: Richard E. Eustis (1st season)
- Home stadium: Ohio Field

1916 Eastern college football independents records
	Conf.			Overall
Team	W	L	T	W		L		T
Army		–		9	–	0	–	0
Pittsburgh		–		8	–	0	–	0
Brown		–		8	–	1	–	0
Colgate		–		8	–	1	–	0
Yale		–		8	–	1	–	0
Fordham		–		6	–	1	–	1
Swarthmore		–		6	–	1	–	1
Penn State		–		8	–	2	–	0
Washington & Jefferson		–		8	–	2	–	0
Boston College		–		6	–	2	–	0
Cornell		–		6	–	2	–	0
Princeton		–		6	–	2	–	0
Lehigh		–		6	–	2	–	1
Dartmouth		–		5	–	2	–	2
Harvard		–		7	–	3	–	0
Penn		–		7	–	3	–	1
Temple		–		3	–	1	–	2
Tufts		–		5	–	3	–	0
Carnegie Tech		–		4	–	3	–	0
Rutgers		–		3	–	2	–	2
NYU		–		4	–	3	–	1
Syracuse		–		5	–	4	–	0
Holy Cross		–		4	–	5	–	0
Vermont		–		4	–	5	–	0
Rhode Island State		–		3	–	4	–	1
New Hampshire		–		3	–	5	–	2
Geneva		–		2	–	5	–	2
Carlisle		–		1	–	3	–	1
Lafayette		–		2	–	6	–	1
Bucknell		–		3	–	9	–	0
Columbia		–		1	–	5	–	2
Franklin & Marshall		–		1	–	7	–	0
Villanova		–		1	–	8	–	0

The 1916 NYU Violets football team was an American football team that represented New York University as an independent during the 1916 college football season. In their only year under head coach Richard E. Eustis, the team compiled a 4–3–1 record.

== Schedule ==
Date	Opponent	Site	Result	Source
October 7	RPI	Ohio Field; Bronx, NY	W 22–0	
October 14	Haverford	Ohio Field; Bronx, NY	T 7–7	
October 21	Wesleyan	Ohio Field; Bronx, NY	L 0–14	
October 28	at Union (NY)	Alexander Field; Schenectady, NY	W 13–0	
November 7	Bucknell	Ohio Field; Bronx, NY	W 13–0	
November 11	Colby	Ohio Field; Bronx, NY	L 0–3	
November 18	Maryland State	Ohio Field; Bronx, NY	L 7–10	
November 25	at Columbia	South Field; New York, NY	W 6–0	
