= 1916 Rutgers Queensmen football team =

American college football season

1916 Rutgers Queensmen football
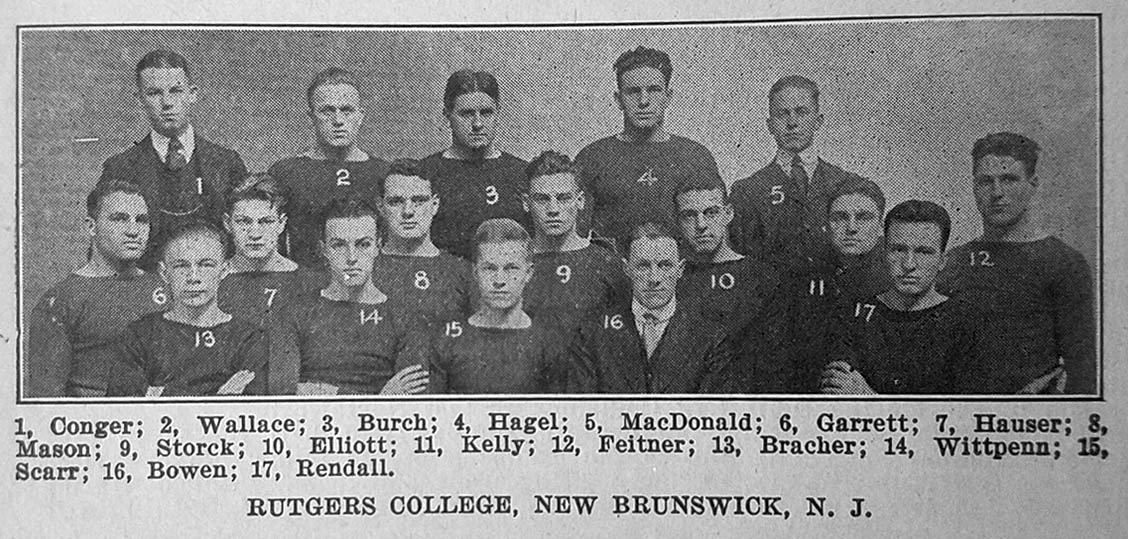
- Conference: Independent
- Record: 3–2–2
- Head coach: George Sanford (4th season)
- Home stadium: Neilson Field

1916 Eastern college football independents records
	Conf.			Overall
Team	W	L	T	W		L		T
Army		–		9	–	0	–	0
Pittsburgh		–		8	–	0	–	0
Brown		–		8	–	1	–	0
Colgate		–		8	–	1	–	0
Yale		–		8	–	1	–	0
Fordham		–		6	–	1	–	1
Swarthmore		–		6	–	1	–	1
Penn State		–		8	–	2	–	0
Washington & Jefferson		–		8	–	2	–	0
Boston College		–		6	–	2	–	0
Cornell		–		6	–	2	–	0
Princeton		–		6	–	2	–	0
Lehigh		–		6	–	2	–	1
Dartmouth		–		5	–	2	–	2
Harvard		–		7	–	3	–	0
Penn		–		7	–	3	–	1
Temple		–		3	–	1	–	2
Tufts		–		5	–	3	–	0
Carnegie Tech		–		4	–	3	–	0
Rutgers		–		3	–	2	–	2
NYU		–		4	–	3	–	1
Syracuse		–		5	–	4	–	0
Holy Cross		–		4	–	5	–	0
Vermont		–		4	–	5	–	0
Rhode Island State		–		3	–	4	–	1
New Hampshire		–		3	–	5	–	2
Geneva		–		2	–	5	–	2
Carlisle		–		1	–	3	–	1
Lafayette		–		2	–	6	–	1
Bucknell		–		3	–	9	–	0
Columbia		–		1	–	5	–	2
Franklin & Marshall		–		1	–	7	–	0
Villanova		–		1	–	8	–	0

The 1916 Rutgers Queensmen football team represented Rutgers University as an independent during the 1916 college football season. In their fourth season under head coach George Sanford, the Queensmen compiled a 3–2–2 record and outscored their opponents, 106 to 52. Sanford was inducted into the College Football Hall of Fame in 1971.

== Schedule ==
Date	Opponent	Site	Result	Attendance	Source
October 7	Villanova	Neilson Field; New Brunswick, NJ	W 33–0		
October 14	Washington and Lee	Neilson Field; New Brunswick, NJ	T 13–13		
October 28	at Brown	Andrews Field; Providence, RI	L 3–21		
November 4	vs. Holy Cross	Wiedenmayer's Park; Newark, NJ	W 14–6	3,000	
November 11	West Virginia	Neilson Field; New Brunswick, NJ	T 0–0		
November 25	Dickinson	Neilson Field; New Brunswick, NJ	W 34–0		
November 30	vs. Washington & Jefferson	Polo Grounds; New York, NY	L 9–12		
