= 1916 Carlisle Indians football team =

American college football season

1916 Carlisle Indians football
- Conference: Independent
- Record: 3–4–1
- Head coach: Morton L. Clevett (1st season)

1916 Eastern college football independents records
| | Conf. | | | Overall |
| Team | W | L | T | W | | L | | T |
|---|---|---|---|---|---|---|---|---|
| Army | | – | | 9 | – | 0 | – | 0 |
| Pittsburgh | | – | | 8 | – | 0 | – | 0 |
| Brown | | – | | 8 | – | 1 | – | 0 |
| Colgate | | – | | 8 | – | 1 | – | 0 |
| Yale | | – | | 8 | – | 1 | – | 0 |
| Fordham | | – | | 6 | – | 1 | – | 1 |
| Swarthmore | | – | | 6 | – | 1 | – | 1 |
| Penn State | | – | | 8 | – | 2 | – | 0 |
| Washington & Jefferson | | – | | 8 | – | 2 | – | 0 |
| Boston College | | – | | 6 | – | 2 | – | 0 |
| Cornell | | – | | 6 | – | 2 | – | 0 |
| Princeton | | – | | 6 | – | 2 | – | 0 |
| Lehigh | | – | | 6 | – | 2 | – | 1 |
| Dartmouth | | – | | 5 | – | 2 | – | 2 |
| Harvard | | – | | 7 | – | 3 | – | 0 |
| Penn | | – | | 7 | – | 3 | – | 1 |
| Temple | | – | | 3 | – | 1 | – | 2 |
| Tufts | | – | | 5 | – | 3 | – | 0 |
| Carnegie Tech | | – | | 4 | – | 3 | – | 0 |
| Rutgers | | – | | 3 | – | 2 | – | 2 |
| NYU | | – | | 4 | – | 3 | – | 1 |
| Syracuse | | – | | 5 | – | 4 | – | 0 |
| Holy Cross | | – | | 4 | – | 5 | – | 0 |
| Vermont | | – | | 4 | – | 5 | – | 0 |
| Rhode Island State | | – | | 3 | – | 4 | – | 1 |
| New Hampshire | | – | | 3 | – | 5 | – | 2 |
| Geneva | | – | | 2 | – | 5 | – | 2 |
| Carlisle | | – | | 1 | – | 3 | – | 1 |
| Lafayette | | – | | 2 | – | 6 | – | 1 |
| Bucknell | | – | | 3 | – | 9 | – | 0 |
| Columbia | | – | | 1 | – | 5 | – | 2 |
| Franklin & Marshall | | – | | 1 | – | 7 | – | 0 |
| Villanova | | – | | 1 | – | 8 | – | 0 |

The 1916 Carlisle Indians football team represented the Carlisle Indian Industrial School as an independent during the 1916 college football season. Led by Morton L. Clevett in his first and only season as head coach, the Indians compiled a record of 3–4–1.

== Schedule ==
| Date | Time | Opponent | Site | Result | Attendance | Source |
|---|---|---|---|---|---|---|
| October 17 | | Lebanon Valley Reserves | Carlisle, PA | W 20–6 | | |
| October 21 | | Conway Hall | Carlisle, PA | W 26–0 | | |
| October 28 | | at Susquehanna | Selinsgrove, PA | L 0–12 | | |
| November 4 | | at Conshohocken | Conshohocken, PA | T 6–6 | 4,000 | |
| November 11 | | at Carson Long Institute | New Bloomfield, PA | W 47–13 | | |
| November 18 | | at Lebanon Valley | Annville Field; Annville, PA | L 0–33 | | |
| November 24 | | at Alfred | Alfred, NY | L 17–27 | | |
| December 2 | 2:00 p.m. | vs. Winchester Club | Yale Bowl; New Haven, CT | L 6–20 | | |
