= 1916 Swarthmore Quakers football team =

American college football season

1916 Swarthmore Quakers football
- Conference: Independent
- Record: 6–1–1
- Head coach: Bill Roper (2nd season)
- Home stadium: Swarthmore Field

1916 Eastern college football independents records
	Conf.			Overall
Team	W	L	T	W		L		T
Army		–		9	–	0	–	0
Pittsburgh		–		8	–	0	–	0
Brown		–		8	–	1	–	0
Colgate		–		8	–	1	–	0
Yale		–		8	–	1	–	0
Fordham		–		6	–	1	–	1
Swarthmore		–		6	–	1	–	1
Penn State		–		8	–	2	–	0
Washington & Jefferson		–		8	–	2	–	0
Boston College		–		6	–	2	–	0
Cornell		–		6	–	2	–	0
Princeton		–		6	–	2	–	0
Lehigh		–		6	–	2	–	1
Dartmouth		–		5	–	2	–	2
Harvard		–		7	–	3	–	0
Penn		–		7	–	3	–	1
Temple		–		3	–	1	–	2
Tufts		–		5	–	3	–	0
Carnegie Tech		–		4	–	3	–	0
Rutgers		–		3	–	2	–	2
NYU		–		4	–	3	–	1
Syracuse		–		5	–	4	–	0
Holy Cross		–		4	–	5	–	0
Vermont		–		4	–	5	–	0
Rhode Island State		–		3	–	4	–	1
New Hampshire		–		3	–	5	–	2
Geneva		–		2	–	5	–	2
Carlisle		–		1	–	3	–	1
Lafayette		–		2	–	6	–	1
Bucknell		–		3	–	9	–	0
Columbia		–		1	–	5	–	2
Franklin & Marshall		–		1	–	7	–	0
Villanova		–		1	–	8	–	0

The 1916 Swarthmore Quakers football team was an American football team that represented Swarthmore College as an independent during the 1916 college football season. The team compiled a 6–1–1 record and outscored opponents by a total of 94 to 45. Bill Roper was the head coach.

A new football field was donated during the 1916 season. The field was built with a contribution from Morris L. Clothier, a Swarthmore alumnus and Philadelphia merchant, and was named Swarthmore Field.

== Schedule ==
Date	Time	Opponent	Site	Result	Source
October 7		at Lafayette	March Field; Easton, PA	W 10–6	
October 14		at Penn	Franklin Field; Philadelphia, PA	W 6–0	
October 21		at Franklin & Marshall	Lancaster, PA	W 6–0	
October 28		Ursinus	Swarthmore, PA	W 13–3	
November 4	2:00 p.m.	at Johns Hopkins	Baltimore, MD	W 14–6	
November 11		at Columbia	South Field; New York, NY	W 18–0	
November 18		Dickinson	Swarthmore, PA	T 20–20	
November 25		at Haverford	Haverford, PA (rivalry)	L 7–10	
