= Charles Comerford =

American college football player

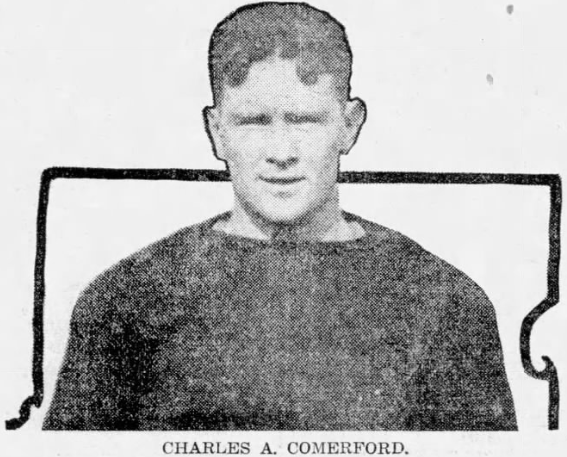

Profile
- Position: End

Personal information
- Born: May 12, 1894; Brookline, Massachusetts, U.S.
- Died: July 24, 1962 (aged 68); Cambridge, Massachusetts, U.S.

Career information
- College: Yale (1916)

Awards and highlights
- First-team All-American (1916)

Charles Aloysius Comerford (May 12, 1894 – July 24, 1962) was an American college football player. He played at the end position at Yale University and selected as a first-team All-American in 1916.

== Early life ==
Comerford was born in 1894 in Brookline, Massachusetts. His father, James Comerford, was a Brookline police officer and an immigrant from Ireland. Comerford attended the Brookline schools and Phillips Exeter Academy.

== Yale ==
Comerford played at the end position for Yale University and was selected as a first-team All-American in 1916 by the International News Service and The Boston Post. The Norwich Bulletin in December 1916 wrote:

Comerford has starred throughout the season for the Blue eleven. He is a deadly tackler and has a good power f sizing up attacks. Comerford is quite adopted to the handling of the forward pass. Comerford in the Harvard game was at his best and it will be remembered of his speed in getting down underneath punts.

In 1917, Comerford enlisted in a Vermont regiment of the American Expeditionary Forces, serving in France during World War I. He served in France until February 1919.

In 1919, after returning from France, Comerford returned to Yale as a pitcher for the baseball team and as an assistant football coach. He continued to be an assistant football coach at Yale at least through the 1922 season.

== Later life ==
Comerford worked as an adjudicator for the Veterans Administration in Boston. His wife was the president of the League of Catholic Women in Boston. He died in 1962 at age 68 at Mt. Auburn Hospital in Cambridge, Massachusetts.
