= 1916 Penn State Nittany Lions football team =

American college football season

1916 Penn State Nittany Lions football
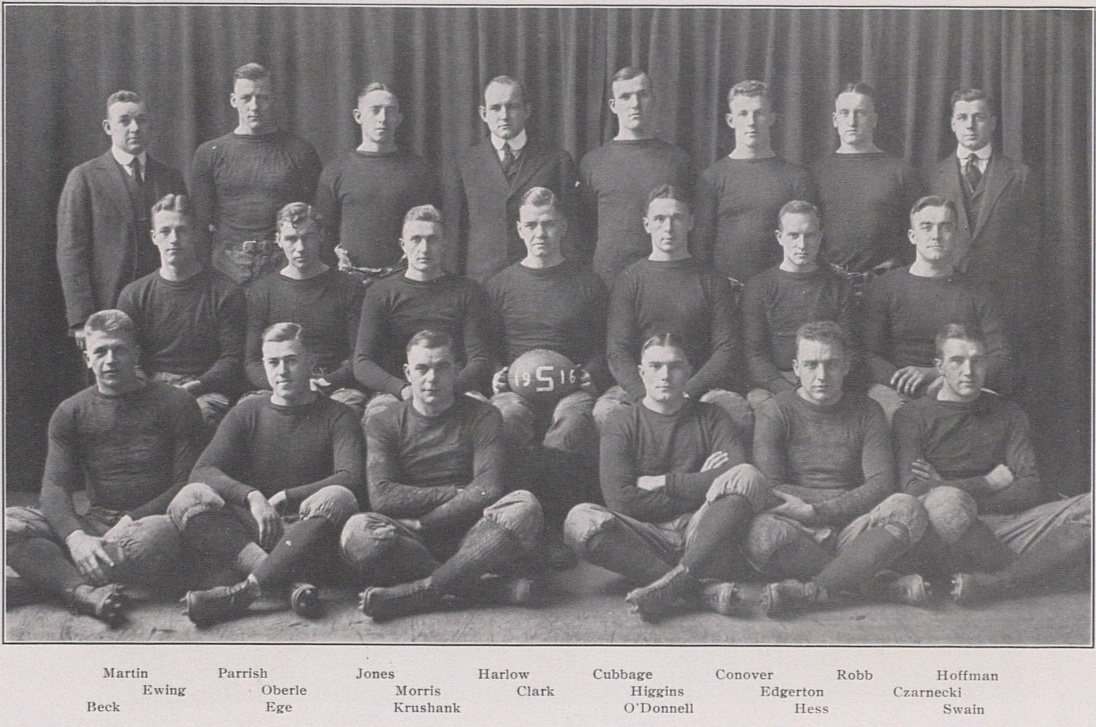
- Conference: Independent
- Record: 8–2
- Head coach: Dick Harlow (2nd season)
- Captain: Harold Clark
- Home stadium: New Beaver Field

1916 Eastern college football independents records
	Conf.			Overall
Team	W	L	T	W		L		T
Army		–		9	–	0	–	0
Pittsburgh		–		8	–	0	–	0
Brown		–		8	–	1	–	0
Colgate		–		8	–	1	–	0
Yale		–		8	–	1	–	0
Fordham		–		6	–	1	–	1
Swarthmore		–		6	–	1	–	1
Penn State		–		8	–	2	–	0
Washington & Jefferson		–		8	–	2	–	0
Boston College		–		6	–	2	–	0
Cornell		–		6	–	2	–	0
Princeton		–		6	–	2	–	0
Lehigh		–		6	–	2	–	1
Dartmouth		–		5	–	2	–	2
Harvard		–		7	–	3	–	0
Penn		–		7	–	3	–	1
Temple		–		3	–	1	–	2
Tufts		–		5	–	3	–	0
Carnegie Tech		–		4	–	3	–	0
Rutgers		–		3	–	2	–	2
NYU		–		4	–	3	–	1
Syracuse		–		5	–	4	–	0
Holy Cross		–		4	–	5	–	0
Vermont		–		4	–	5	–	0
Rhode Island State		–		3	–	4	–	1
New Hampshire		–		3	–	5	–	2
Geneva		–		2	–	5	–	2
Carlisle		–		1	–	3	–	1
Lafayette		–		2	–	6	–	1
Bucknell		–		3	–	9	–	0
Columbia		–		1	–	5	–	2
Franklin & Marshall		–		1	–	7	–	0
Villanova		–		1	–	8	–	0

The 1916 Penn State Nittany Lions football team represented the Pennsylvania State University as an independent during the 1916 college football season. The team was coached by Dick Harlow, with Lawrence Whitney as an assistant coach, and played its home games in New Beaver Field in State College, Pennsylvania.

== Schedule ==
Date	Opponent	Site	Result	Attendance	Source
September 23	Susquehanna	New Beaver Field; State College, PA	W 27–0		
September 30	Westminster (PA)	New Beaver Field; State College, PA	W 55–0		
October 7	Bucknell	New Beaver Field; State College, PA	W 50–7		
October 14	West Virginia Wesleyan	New Beaver Field; State College, PA	W 39–0		
October 21	at Penn	Franklin Field; Philadelphia, PA	L 0–15		
October 28	Gettysburg	New Beaver Field; State College, PA	W 48–2		
November 4	Geneva	New Beaver Field; State College, PA	W 79–0		
November 11	at Lehigh	Taylor Stadium; Bethlehem, PA	W 10–7		
November 17	Lafayette	New Beaver Field; State College, PA	W 40–0		
November 30	at Pittsburgh	Forbes Field; Pittsburgh, PA (rivalry)	L 0–31	27,500	
