= 1916 Bucknell football team =

American college football season

1916 Bucknell football
- Conference: Independent
- Record: 3–9
- Head coach: George Johnson (2nd season)

1916 Eastern college football independents records
	Conf.			Overall
Team	W	L	T	W		L		T
Army		–		9	–	0	–	0
Pittsburgh		–		8	–	0	–	0
Brown		–		8	–	1	–	0
Colgate		–		8	–	1	–	0
Yale		–		8	–	1	–	0
Fordham		–		6	–	1	–	1
Swarthmore		–		6	–	1	–	1
Penn State		–		8	–	2	–	0
Washington & Jefferson		–		8	–	2	–	0
Boston College		–		6	–	2	–	0
Cornell		–		6	–	2	–	0
Princeton		–		6	–	2	–	0
Lehigh		–		6	–	2	–	1
Dartmouth		–		5	–	2	–	2
Harvard		–		7	–	3	–	0
Penn		–		7	–	3	–	1
Temple		–		3	–	1	–	2
Tufts		–		5	–	3	–	0
Carnegie Tech		–		4	–	3	–	0
Rutgers		–		3	–	2	–	2
NYU		–		4	–	3	–	1
Syracuse		–		5	–	4	–	0
Holy Cross		–		4	–	5	–	0
Vermont		–		4	–	5	–	0
Rhode Island State		–		3	–	4	–	1
New Hampshire		–		3	–	5	–	2
Geneva		–		2	–	5	–	2
Carlisle		–		1	–	3	–	1
Lafayette		–		2	–	6	–	1
Bucknell		–		3	–	9	–	0
Columbia		–		1	–	5	–	2
Franklin & Marshall		–		1	–	7	–	0
Villanova		–		1	–	8	–	0

The 1916 Bucknell football team was an American football team that represented Bucknell University as an independent during the 1916 college football season. In its second season under head coach George Johnson, the team compiled a 3–9 record.

== Schedule ==
Date	Opponent	Site	Result	Source
September 23	Bloomsburg Normal	Lewisburg, PA	W 31–0	
September 30	Albright	Lewisburg, PA	W 37–0	
October 7	at Penn State	New Beaver Field; State College, PA	L 7–50	
October 14	at Susquehanna	Selinsgrove, PA	L 9–10	
October 21	at Cornell	Schoellkopf Field; Ithaca, NY	L 0–19	
October 28	at Muhlenberg	Allentown, PA	L 0–17	
November 4	at Princeton	Palmer Stadium; Princeton, NJ	L 0–42	
November 7	at NYU	Ohio Field; Bronx, NY	L 0–13	
November 11	at Washington & Lee	Wilson Field; Lexington, VA	L 7–55	
November 18	vs. Gettysburg	Lewisburg, PA	L 0–17	
November 25	at Georgetown	Georgetown Field; Washington, DC	L 0–78	
November 30	Lebanon Valley	Lewisburg, PA	W 8–0	
