= 1916 Dartmouth football team =

American college football season

1916 Dartmouth football
- Conference: Independent
- Record: 5–2–2
- Head coach: Frank Cavanaugh (6th season)
- Captain: Bernard Gerrish

1916 Eastern college football independents records
	Conf.			Overall
Team	W	L	T	W		L		T
Army		–		9	–	0	–	0
Pittsburgh		–		8	–	0	–	0
Brown		–		8	–	1	–	0
Colgate		–		8	–	1	–	0
Yale		–		8	–	1	–	0
Fordham		–		6	–	1	–	1
Swarthmore		–		6	–	1	–	1
Penn State		–		8	–	2	–	0
Washington & Jefferson		–		8	–	2	–	0
Boston College		–		6	–	2	–	0
Cornell		–		6	–	2	–	0
Princeton		–		6	–	2	–	0
Lehigh		–		6	–	2	–	1
Dartmouth		–		5	–	2	–	2
Harvard		–		7	–	3	–	0
Penn		–		7	–	3	–	1
Temple		–		3	–	1	–	2
Tufts		–		5	–	3	–	0
Carnegie Tech		–		4	–	3	–	0
Rutgers		–		3	–	2	–	2
NYU		–		4	–	3	–	1
Syracuse		–		5	–	4	–	0
Holy Cross		–		4	–	5	–	0
Vermont		–		4	–	5	–	0
Rhode Island State		–		3	–	4	–	1
New Hampshire		–		3	–	5	–	2
Geneva		–		2	–	5	–	2
Carlisle		–		1	–	3	–	1
Lafayette		–		2	–	6	–	1
Bucknell		–		3	–	9	–	0
Columbia		–		1	–	5	–	2
Franklin & Marshall		–		1	–	7	–	0
Villanova		–		1	–	8	–	0

The 1916 Dartmouth football team was an American football team that represented Dartmouth College as an independent during the 1916 college football season. In its sixth and final season under head coach Frank Cavanaugh, the team compiled a 5–2–2 record and outscored opponents by a total of 206 to 47. Bernard Gerrish was the team captain.

== Schedule ==
Date	Opponent	Site	Result	Attendance	Source
September 23	New Hampshire	Hanover, NH (rivalry)	W 33–0		
September 30	Boston College	Hanover, NH	W 32–6		
October 7	Lebanon Valley	Hanover, NH	W 47–0		
October 14	Massachusetts	Hanover, NH	W 62–0		
October 21	vs. Georgetown	Haverhill, MA	L 0–10		
October 28	at Princeton	Palmer Stadium; Princeton, NJ	L 3–7		
November 4	vs. Syracuse	Exposition Grounds; Springfield, MA	W 15–10	12,000–13,000	
November 11	at Penn	Franklin Field; Philadelphia, PA	T 7–7		
November 18	West Virginia	Hanover, NH	T 7–7		
