= 1916 Penn Quakers football team =

American college football season

1916 Penn Quakers football

Rose Bowl, L 0–14 vs. Oregon
- Conference: Independent
- Record: 7–3–1
- Head coach: Bob Folwell (1st season)
- Captain: Neil Matthews
- Home stadium: Franklin Field

1916 Eastern college football independents records
	Conf.			Overall
Team	W	L	T	W		L		T
Army		–		9	–	0	–	0
Pittsburgh		–		8	–	0	–	0
Brown		–		8	–	1	–	0
Colgate		–		8	–	1	–	0
Yale		–		8	–	1	–	0
Fordham		–		6	–	1	–	1
Swarthmore		–		6	–	1	–	1
Penn State		–		8	–	2	–	0
Washington & Jefferson		–		8	–	2	–	0
Boston College		–		6	–	2	–	0
Cornell		–		6	–	2	–	0
Princeton		–		6	–	2	–	0
Lehigh		–		6	–	2	–	1
Dartmouth		–		5	–	2	–	2
Harvard		–		7	–	3	–	0
Penn		–		7	–	3	–	1
Temple		–		3	–	1	–	2
Tufts		–		5	–	3	–	0
Carnegie Tech		–		4	–	3	–	0
Rutgers		–		3	–	2	–	2
NYU		–		4	–	3	–	1
Syracuse		–		5	–	4	–	0
Holy Cross		–		4	–	5	–	0
Vermont		–		4	–	5	–	0
Rhode Island State		–		3	–	4	–	1
New Hampshire		–		3	–	5	–	2
Geneva		–		2	–	5	–	2
Carlisle		–		1	–	3	–	1
Lafayette		–		2	–	6	–	1
Bucknell		–		3	–	9	–	0
Columbia		–		1	–	5	–	2
Franklin & Marshall		–		1	–	7	–	0
Villanova		–		1	–	8	–	0

The 1916 Penn Quakers football team was an American football team that represented the University of Pennsylvania as an independent during the 1916 college football season. In their first season under head coach Bob Folwell, the Quakers compiled a 7–3–1 record, lost to Oregon in the 1917 Rose Bowl, and outscored opponents by a total of 120 to 57.

== Schedule ==
Date	Opponent	Site	Result	Attendance	Source
September 30	West Virginia	Franklin Field; Philadelphia, PA	W 3–0		
October 7	Franklin & Marshall	Franklin Field; Philadelphia, PA	W 27–0		
October 14	Swarthmore	Franklin Field; Philadelphia, PA	L 0–6		
October 21	Penn State	Franklin Field; Philadelphia, PA	W 15–0		
October 28	at Pittsburgh	Forbes Field; Pittsburgh, PA	L 0–20	27,000–32,000	
November 4	Lafayette	Franklin Field; Philadelphia, PA	W 19–0		
November 11	Dartmouth	Franklin Field; Philadelphia, PA	T 7–7		
November 18	at Michigan	Ferry Field; Ann Arbor, MI	W 10–7	25,584	
November 25	West Virginia Wesleyan	Franklin Field; Philadelphia, PA	W 16–0		
November 30	Cornell	Franklin Field; Philadelphia, PA (rivalry)	W 23–3		
January 1, 1917	vs. Oregon	Rose Bowl; Pasadena, CA (Rose Bowl)	L 0–14	27,000	
