= 1916 Princeton Tigers football team =

American college football season

1916 Princeton Tigers football
- Conference: Independent
- Record: 6–2
- Head coach: John H. Rush (2nd season)
- Home stadium: Palmer Stadium

1916 Eastern college football independents records
	Conf.			Overall
Team	W	L	T	W		L		T
Army		–		9	–	0	–	0
Pittsburgh		–		8	–	0	–	0
Brown		–		8	–	1	–	0
Colgate		–		8	–	1	–	0
Yale		–		8	–	1	–	0
Fordham		–		6	–	1	–	1
Swarthmore		–		6	–	1	–	1
Penn State		–		8	–	2	–	0
Washington & Jefferson		–		8	–	2	–	0
Boston College		–		6	–	2	–	0
Cornell		–		6	–	2	–	0
Princeton		–		6	–	2	–	0
Lehigh		–		6	–	2	–	1
Dartmouth		–		5	–	2	–	2
Harvard		–		7	–	3	–	0
Penn		–		7	–	3	–	1
Temple		–		3	–	1	–	2
Tufts		–		5	–	3	–	0
Carnegie Tech		–		4	–	3	–	0
Rutgers		–		3	–	2	–	2
NYU		–		4	–	3	–	1
Syracuse		–		5	–	4	–	0
Holy Cross		–		4	–	5	–	0
Vermont		–		4	–	5	–	0
Rhode Island State		–		3	–	4	–	1
New Hampshire		–		3	–	5	–	2
Geneva		–		2	–	5	–	2
Carlisle		–		1	–	3	–	1
Lafayette		–		2	–	6	–	1
Bucknell		–		3	–	9	–	0
Columbia		–		1	–	5	–	2
Franklin & Marshall		–		1	–	7	–	0
Villanova		–		1	–	8	–	0

The 1916 Princeton Tigers football team represented Princeton University in the 1916 college football season. The team finished with a 6–2 record under second-year head coach John H. Rush. Princeton guard Frank T. Hogg was selected as a consensus first-team honoree on the 1916 College Football All-America Team. Three other Princeton players (end Charles Highley, center Alfred Gennert, and a tackle with the surname McLean) were selected as first-team honorees by at least one selector in 1916.

== Schedule ==
Date	Opponent	Site	Result	Attendance	Source
September 30	at Holy Cross	Fitton Field; Worcester, MA	W 21–0	6,000	
October 7	North Carolina	Palmer Stadium; Princeton, NJ	W 29–0		
October 14	Tufts	Palmer Stadium; Princeton, NJ	W 3–0		
October 21	Lafayette	Palmer Stadium; Princeton, NJ	W 33–0		
October 28	Dartmouth	Palmer Stadium; Princeton, NJ	W 7–3		
November 4	Bucknell	Palmer Stadium; Princeton, NJ	W 42–0		
November 11	at Harvard	Harvard Stadium; Boston, MA (rivalry)	L 0–3		
November 18	Yale	Palmer Stadium; Princeton, NJ (rivalry)	L 0–10	42,000	
