= 1916 Lehigh Brown and White football team =

American college football season

1916 Lehigh Brown and White football
- Conference: Independent
- Record: 6–2–1
- Head coach: Tom Keady (5th season)
- Home stadium: Taylor Stadium

1916 Eastern college football independents records
	Conf.			Overall
Team	W	L	T	W		L		T
Army		–		9	–	0	–	0
Pittsburgh		–		8	–	0	–	0
Brown		–		8	–	1	–	0
Colgate		–		8	–	1	–	0
Yale		–		8	–	1	–	0
Fordham		–		6	–	1	–	1
Swarthmore		–		6	–	1	–	1
Penn State		–		8	–	2	–	0
Washington & Jefferson		–		8	–	2	–	0
Boston College		–		6	–	2	–	0
Cornell		–		6	–	2	–	0
Princeton		–		6	–	2	–	0
Lehigh		–		6	–	2	–	1
Dartmouth		–		5	–	2	–	2
Harvard		–		7	–	3	–	0
Penn		–		7	–	3	–	1
Temple		–		3	–	1	–	2
Tufts		–		5	–	3	–	0
Carnegie Tech		–		4	–	3	–	0
Rutgers		–		3	–	2	–	2
NYU		–		4	–	3	–	1
Syracuse		–		5	–	4	–	0
Holy Cross		–		4	–	5	–	0
Vermont		–		4	–	5	–	0
Rhode Island State		–		3	–	4	–	1
New Hampshire		–		3	–	5	–	2
Geneva		–		2	–	5	–	2
Carlisle		–		1	–	3	–	1
Lafayette		–		2	–	6	–	1
Bucknell		–		3	–	9	–	0
Columbia		–		1	–	5	–	2
Franklin & Marshall		–		1	–	7	–	0
Villanova		–		1	–	8	–	0

The 1916 Lehigh Brown and White football team was an American football team that represented Lehigh University as an independent during the 1916 college football season. In its fifth season under head coach Tom Keady, the team compiled a 6–2–1 record and outscored opponents by a total of 171 to 45. Lehigh played home games at Taylor Stadium in South Bethlehem, Pennsylvania.

== Schedule ==
Date	Opponent	Site	Result	Attendance	Source
September 30	at Ursinus	Collegeville, PA	W 21–0		
October 7	at Albright	Myerstown, PA	W 61–6		
October 14	at Yale	Yale Field; New Haven, CT	L 0–12	7,000	
October 21	Lebanon Valley	Taylor Stadium; South Bethlehem, PA	T 3–3		
October 28	Catholic University	Taylor Stadium; South Bethlehem, PA	W 27–7		
November 4	at Muhlenberg	Allentown, PA	W 9–0		
November 11	Penn State	Taylor Stadium; South Bethlehem, PA	L 7–10		
November 18	Franklin & Marshall	Taylor Stadium; South Bethlehem, PA	W 27–7		
November 25	at Lafayette	Easton, PA (rivalry)	W 16–0		
