= 1916 Cornell Big Red football team =

American college football season

1916 Cornell Big Red football
- Conference: Independent
- Record: 6–2
- Head coach: Albert Sharpe (5th season)
- Captain: L. W. Mueller
- Home stadium: Schoellkopf Field

1916 Eastern college football independents records
	Conf.			Overall
Team	W	L	T	W		L		T
Army		–		9	–	0	–	0
Pittsburgh		–		8	–	0	–	0
Brown		–		8	–	1	–	0
Colgate		–		8	–	1	–	0
Yale		–		8	–	1	–	0
Fordham		–		6	–	1	–	1
Swarthmore		–		6	–	1	–	1
Penn State		–		8	–	2	–	0
Washington & Jefferson		–		8	–	2	–	0
Boston College		–		6	–	2	–	0
Cornell		–		6	–	2	–	0
Princeton		–		6	–	2	–	0
Lehigh		–		6	–	2	–	1
Dartmouth		–		5	–	2	–	2
Harvard		–		7	–	3	–	0
Penn		–		7	–	3	–	1
Temple		–		3	–	1	–	2
Tufts		–		5	–	3	–	0
Carnegie Tech		–		4	–	3	–	0
Rutgers		–		3	–	2	–	2
NYU		–		4	–	3	–	1
Syracuse		–		5	–	4	–	0
Holy Cross		–		4	–	5	–	0
Vermont		–		4	–	5	–	0
Rhode Island State		–		3	–	4	–	1
New Hampshire		–		3	–	5	–	2
Geneva		–		2	–	5	–	2
Carlisle		–		1	–	3	–	1
Lafayette		–		2	–	6	–	1
Bucknell		–		3	–	9	–	0
Columbia		–		1	–	5	–	2
Franklin & Marshall		–		1	–	7	–	0
Villanova		–		1	–	8	–	0

The 1916 Cornell Big Red football team was an American football team that represented Cornell University during the 1916 college football season. In their fifth season under head coach Albert Sharpe, the Big Red compiled a 6–2 record and outscored all opponents by a combined total of 165 to 73. No Cornell players received honors on Walter Camp's 1916 College Football All-America Team. However, three players received All-America honors from other selectors: quarterback Fritz Shiverick (first team, United Press and Paul Purman); tackle Fred Gillies (first team, Fielding H. Yost); and end Paul Eckley (second team, Walter Eckersall).

== Schedule ==
Date	Opponent	Site	Result	Attendance
October 7	Gettysburg	Schoellkopf Field; Ithaca, NY	W 26–0	
October 14	Williams	Schoellkopf Field; Ithaca, NY	W 42–0	
October 21	Bucknell	Schoellkopf Field; Ithaca, NY	W 19–0	
October 28	at Harvard	Harvard Stadium; Boston, MA	L 0–23	
November 4	Carnegie Tech	Schoellkopf Field; Ithaca, NY	W 15–7	
November 11	Michigan	Schoellkopf Field; Ithaca, NY	W 23–20	6,000
November 18	Massachusetts	Schoellkopf Field; Ithaca, NY	W 37–0	
November 30	at Penn	Franklin Field; Philadelphia, PA (rivalry)	L 3–23	
