= 1916 New Hampshire football team =

American college football season

1916 New Hampshire football
- Conference: Independent
- Record: 3–5–2
- Head coach: Butch Cowell (2nd season)
- Captain: Kyle C. Westover
- Home stadium: College grounds, Durham, NH

1916 Eastern college football independents records
	Conf.			Overall
Team	W	L	T	W		L		T
Army		–		9	–	0	–	0
Pittsburgh		–		8	–	0	–	0
Brown		–		8	–	1	–	0
Colgate		–		8	–	1	–	0
Yale		–		8	–	1	–	0
Fordham		–		6	–	1	–	1
Swarthmore		–		6	–	1	–	1
Penn State		–		8	–	2	–	0
Washington & Jefferson		–		8	–	2	–	0
Boston College		–		6	–	2	–	0
Cornell		–		6	–	2	–	0
Princeton		–		6	–	2	–	0
Lehigh		–		6	–	2	–	1
Dartmouth		–		5	–	2	–	2
Harvard		–		7	–	3	–	0
Penn		–		7	–	3	–	1
Temple		–		3	–	1	–	2
Tufts		–		5	–	3	–	0
Carnegie Tech		–		4	–	3	–	0
Rutgers		–		3	–	2	–	2
NYU		–		4	–	3	–	1
Syracuse		–		5	–	4	–	0
Holy Cross		–		4	–	5	–	0
Vermont		–		4	–	5	–	0
Rhode Island State		–		3	–	4	–	1
New Hampshire		–		3	–	5	–	2
Geneva		–		2	–	5	–	2
Carlisle		–		1	–	3	–	1
Lafayette		–		2	–	6	–	1
Bucknell		–		3	–	9	–	0
Columbia		–		1	–	5	–	2
Franklin & Marshall		–		1	–	7	–	0
Villanova		–		1	–	8	–	0

The 1916 New Hampshire football team (Note: The school did not adopt the Wildcats nickname until February 1926; before then, they were generally referred to as "the blue and white".) was an American football team that represented New Hampshire College of Agriculture and the Mechanic Arts (Note: The school was often referred to as New Hampshire College or New Hampshire State College in newspapers of the era.) during the 1916 college football season—the school became the University of New Hampshire in 1923. Under second-year head coach Butch Cowell, the team finished with a record of 3–5–2.

== Schedule ==
During this era, teams played in the one-platoon system. Scoring values were consistent with the present day: six points for a touchdown, one point for a conversion kick (extra point), and three points for a field goal. (Note: For additional detail, see Early history of American football#Scoring table.)

Date	Opponent	Site	Result	Attendance	Source
September 23	at Dartmouth	Hanover, NH (rivalry)	L 0–33		
September 30	at Maine	Alumni Field; Orono, ME (rivalry)	T 0–0		
October 7	at Colby	Seaverns Field; Waterville, ME	L 0–13		
October 12	at Boston College	Alumni Field; Chestnut Hill, MA	L 0–19		
October 14	at Bates	Garcelon Field; Lewiston, ME	L 0–7		
October 21	Norwich	Durham, NH	W 13–0		
October 28	Vermont	Central Park; Dover, NH	L 9–13		
November 4	at Connecticut	Storrs, CT	W 26–0		(Note: College Football Data Warehouse lists the score as 25–0, but New Hampshire's media guide and a game recap in The New Hampshire both state 26–0.)
November 11	Middlebury	Durham, NH	T 0–0		
November 18	Rhode Island State	Durham, NH	W 12–0		
