= 1916 Columbia Lions football team =

American college football season

1916 Columbia Lions football
- Conference: Independent
- Record: 1–5–2
- Head coach: T. Nelson Metcalf (2nd season)
- Captain: J. A. Healy
- Home stadium: South Field

1916 Eastern college football independents records
	Conf.			Overall
Team	W	L	T	W		L		T
Army		–		9	–	0	–	0
Pittsburgh		–		8	–	0	–	0
Brown		–		8	–	1	–	0
Colgate		–		8	–	1	–	0
Yale		–		8	–	1	–	0
Fordham		–		6	–	1	–	1
Swarthmore		–		6	–	1	–	1
Penn State		–		8	–	2	–	0
Washington & Jefferson		–		8	–	2	–	0
Boston College		–		6	–	2	–	0
Cornell		–		6	–	2	–	0
Princeton		–		6	–	2	–	0
Lehigh		–		6	–	2	–	1
Dartmouth		–		5	–	2	–	2
Harvard		–		7	–	3	–	0
Penn		–		7	–	3	–	1
Temple		–		3	–	1	–	2
Tufts		–		5	–	3	–	0
Carnegie Tech		–		4	–	3	–	0
Rutgers		–		3	–	2	–	2
NYU		–		4	–	3	–	1
Syracuse		–		5	–	4	–	0
Holy Cross		–		4	–	5	–	0
Vermont		–		4	–	5	–	0
Rhode Island State		–		3	–	4	–	1
New Hampshire		–		3	–	5	–	2
Geneva		–		2	–	5	–	2
Carlisle		–		1	–	3	–	1
Lafayette		–		2	–	6	–	1
Bucknell		–		3	–	9	–	0
Columbia		–		1	–	5	–	2
Franklin & Marshall		–		1	–	7	–	0
Villanova		–		1	–	8	–	0

The 1916 Columbia Lions football team was an American football team that represented Columbia University as an independent during the 1916 college football season. In their second year after a ten-year hiatus and second year with head coach T. Nelson Metcalf, the Lions followed their undefeated 1915 season with a 1–5–2 campaign, and were outscored 13 to 81 by opponents. The team played its home games on South Field, part of the university's campus in Morningside Heights in Upper Manhattan.

== Schedule ==
Date	Opponent	Site	Result	Attendance	Source
October 7	Hamilton	South Field; New York, NY	L 7–14		
October 14	Vermont	South Field; New York, NY	W 6–0		
October 21	Union (NY)	South Field; New York, NY	L 0–3		
October 28	Williams	South Field; New York, NY	T 0–0	6,000	
November 7	Stevens	South Field; New York, NY	T 0–0	6,000	
November 11	Swarthmore	South Field; New York, NY	L 0–18		
November 18	Wesleyan	South Field; New York, NY	L 0–40		
November 28	NYU	South Field; New York, NY	L 0–6	5,000	
