= 1916 Vermont Green and Gold football team =

American college football season

1916 Vermont Green and Gold football
- Conference: Independent
- Record: 4–5
- Head coach: Edwin W. Leary (1st season)
- Home stadium: Centennial Field

1916 Eastern college football independents records
	Conf.			Overall
Team	W	L	T	W		L		T
Army		–		9	–	0	–	0
Pittsburgh		–		8	–	0	–	0
Brown		–		8	–	1	–	0
Colgate		–		8	–	1	–	0
Yale		–		8	–	1	–	0
Fordham		–		6	–	1	–	1
Swarthmore		–		6	–	1	–	1
Penn State		–		8	–	2	–	0
Washington & Jefferson		–		8	–	2	–	0
Boston College		–		6	–	2	–	0
Cornell		–		6	–	2	–	0
Princeton		–		6	–	2	–	0
Lehigh		–		6	–	2	–	1
Dartmouth		–		5	–	2	–	2
Harvard		–		7	–	3	–	0
Penn		–		7	–	3	–	1
Temple		–		3	–	1	–	2
Tufts		–		5	–	3	–	0
Carnegie Tech		–		4	–	3	–	0
Rutgers		–		3	–	2	–	2
NYU		–		4	–	3	–	1
Syracuse		–		5	–	4	–	0
Holy Cross		–		4	–	5	–	0
Vermont		–		4	–	5	–	0
Rhode Island State		–		3	–	4	–	1
New Hampshire		–		3	–	5	–	2
Geneva		–		2	–	5	–	2
Carlisle		–		1	–	3	–	1
Lafayette		–		2	–	6	–	1
Bucknell		–		3	–	9	–	0
Columbia		–		1	–	5	–	2
Franklin & Marshall		–		1	–	7	–	0
Villanova		–		1	–	8	–	0

The 1916 Vermont Green and Gold football team was an American football team that represented the University of Vermont as an independent during the 1916 college football season. In their first year under head coach Edwin W. Leary, the team compiled a 4–5 record.

== Schedule ==
Date	Opponent	Site	Result	Source
October 4	Saint Michael's	Centennial Field; Burlington, VT	W 33–0	
October 7	Clarkson	Centennial Field; Burlington, VT	W 52–7	
October 14	at Columbia	South Field; New York, NY	L 0–6	
October 21	Connecticut	Centennial Field; Burlington, VT	W 21–10	
October 28	at New Hampshire	Central Park; Dover, NH	W 13–9	
November 4	at Brown	Andrews Field; Providence, RI	L 0–42	
November 11	at Norwich	Northfield, VT	L 6–7	
November 18	Middlebury	Centennial Field; Burlington, VT	L 2–6	
November 30	at Rochester	Baseball Park; Rochester, NY	L 6–10	
