= 1916 Yale Bulldogs football team =

American college football season

1916 Yale Bulldogs football
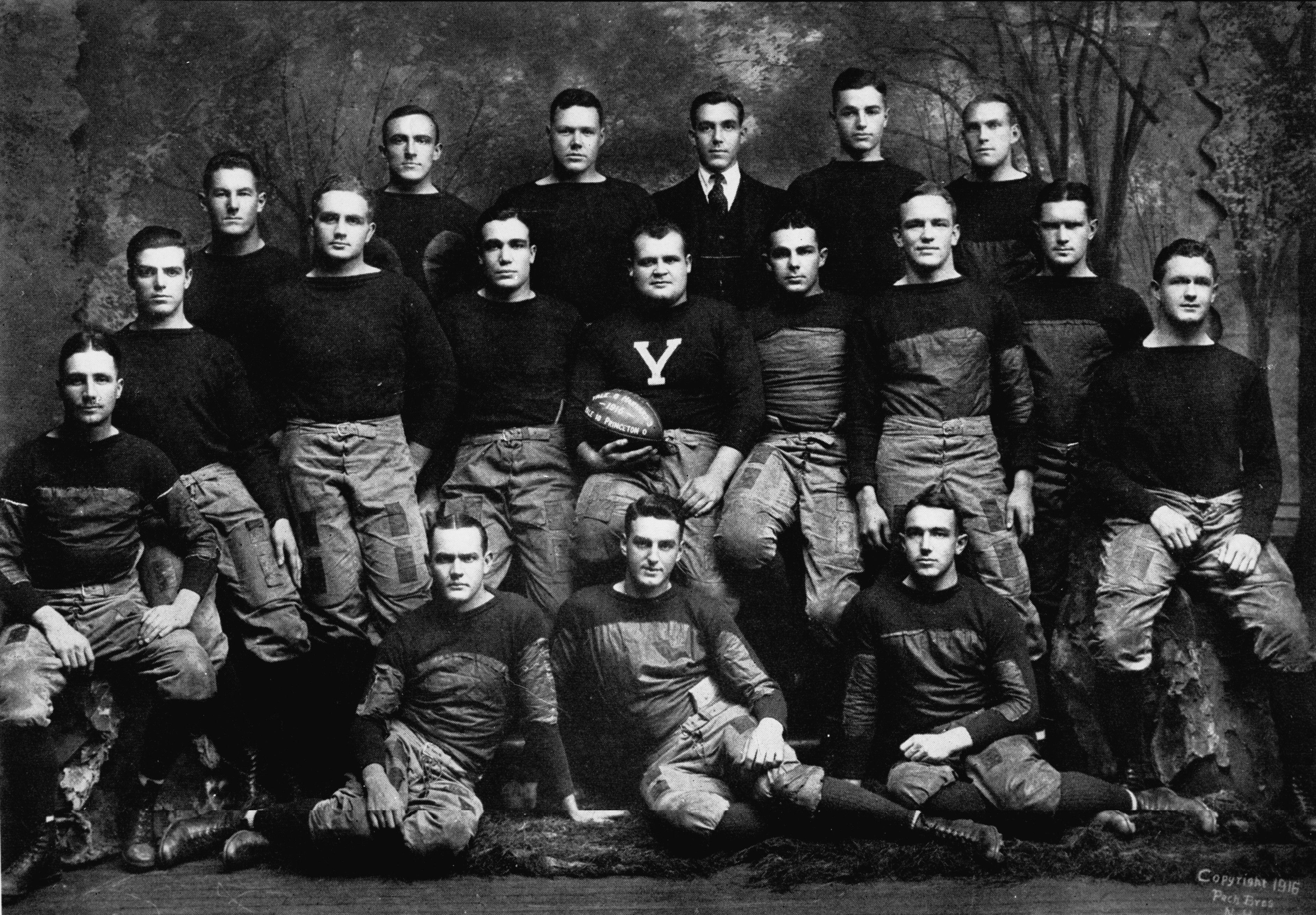
- Conference: Independent
- Record: 8–1
- Head coach: Tad Jones (1st season)
- Captain: Clinton Black
- Home stadium: Yale Bowl, Yale Field

1916 Eastern college football independents records
	Conf.			Overall
Team	W	L	T	W		L		T
Army		–		9	–	0	–	0
Pittsburgh		–		8	–	0	–	0
Brown		–		8	–	1	–	0
Colgate		–		8	–	1	–	0
Yale		–		8	–	1	–	0
Fordham		–		6	–	1	–	1
Swarthmore		–		6	–	1	–	1
Penn State		–		8	–	2	–	0
Washington & Jefferson		–		8	–	2	–	0
Boston College		–		6	–	2	–	0
Cornell		–		6	–	2	–	0
Princeton		–		6	–	2	–	0
Lehigh		–		6	–	2	–	1
Dartmouth		–		5	–	2	–	2
Harvard		–		7	–	3	–	0
Penn		–		7	–	3	–	1
Temple		–		3	–	1	–	2
Tufts		–		5	–	3	–	0
Carnegie Tech		–		4	–	3	–	0
Rutgers		–		3	–	2	–	2
NYU		–		4	–	3	–	1
Syracuse		–		5	–	4	–	0
Holy Cross		–		4	–	5	–	0
Vermont		–		4	–	5	–	0
Rhode Island State		–		3	–	4	–	1
New Hampshire		–		3	–	5	–	2
Geneva		–		2	–	5	–	2
Carlisle		–		1	–	3	–	1
Lafayette		–		2	–	6	–	1
Bucknell		–		3	–	9	–	0
Columbia		–		1	–	5	–	2
Franklin & Marshall		–		1	–	7	–	0
Villanova		–		1	–	8	–	0

The 1916 Yale Bulldogs football team represented Yale University in the 1916 college football season. The Bulldogs finished with an 8–1 record under first-year head coach Tad Jones. The team outscored its opponents by a combined score of 182 to 44 and suffered its only loss to Brown. Yale guard Clinton Black was a consensus pick for the 1916 College Football All-America Team, and four other Yale players (ends Charles Comerford and George Moseley, halfback Harry LeGore, and a guard with the surname Fox) also received first-team All-American honors from at least one selector in 1916. Black was the team's captain.

== Schedule ==
Date	Opponent	Site	Result	Attendance	Source
September 30	Carnegie Tech	Yale Bowl; New Haven, CT	W 25–0		
October 7	Virginia	Yale Bowl; New Haven, CT	W 61–3		
October 14	Lehigh	Yale Field; New Haven, CT	W 12–0	7,000	
October 20	VPI	Yale Bowl; New Haven, CT	W 19–0	5,000	
October 28	Washington & Jefferson	Yale Bowl; New Haven, CT	W 36–14		
November 4	Colgate	Yale Bowl; New Haven, CT	W 7–3		
November 11	Brown	Yale Bowl; New Haven, CT	L 6–21		
November 18	at Princeton	Palmer Stadium; Princeton, NJ (rivalry)	W 10–0	42,000	
November 25	Harvard	Yale Bowl; New Haven, CT (rivalry)	W 6–3		

== Roster ==
- Allan W. Ames
- Howard M. Baldridge, T
- Robert S. Bingham, HB
- Clinton Black, G
- James M. Braden, FB
- Bridges, G
- Tim Callahan
- Harold D. Carey, HB
- Heylinger Church, E
- Charles Comerford, E
- Coxe, T
- Durfee, G
- Lawrence W. Fox, T
- Charles L. C. Galt, G
- Artemus Gates, E
- James Gould
- Fred W. Graham, G
- Reginald L. Hutchinson, FB
- Emile W. Jacques, FB
- Chester J. LaRoche, QB
- Harry LeGore, HB
- Leisenring, C
- Lynch, E
- George Clark Moseley, E
- Joseph M. Neville, HB
- Potter, QB
- Charles M. Sheldon, T
- Edward T. Smith. QB
- M. Smith, C
- Charles Phelps Taft II, T
- Howell Van Nostrand
- Arthur Vorys, C
- Franklyn E. Waite, HB
- Philip Zenner, G
