= 1916 Boston College football team =

American college football season

1916 Boston College football
- Conference: Independent
- Record: 6–2
- Head coach: Charles Brickley (1st season)
- Captain: Maurice Dullea
- Home stadium: Alumni Field, Fenway Park

1916 Eastern college football independents records
	Conf.			Overall
Team	W	L	T	W		L		T
Army		–		9	–	0	–	0
Pittsburgh		–		8	–	0	–	0
Brown		–		8	–	1	–	0
Colgate		–		8	–	1	–	0
Yale		–		8	–	1	–	0
Fordham		–		6	–	1	–	1
Swarthmore		–		6	–	1	–	1
Penn State		–		8	–	2	–	0
Washington & Jefferson		–		8	–	2	–	0
Boston College		–		6	–	2	–	0
Cornell		–		6	–	2	–	0
Princeton		–		6	–	2	–	0
Lehigh		–		6	–	2	–	1
Dartmouth		–		5	–	2	–	2
Harvard		–		7	–	3	–	0
Penn		–		7	–	3	–	1
Temple		–		3	–	1	–	2
Tufts		–		5	–	3	–	0
Carnegie Tech		–		4	–	3	–	0
Rutgers		–		3	–	2	–	2
NYU		–		4	–	3	–	1
Syracuse		–		5	–	4	–	0
Holy Cross		–		4	–	5	–	0
Vermont		–		4	–	5	–	0
Rhode Island State		–		3	–	4	–	1
New Hampshire		–		3	–	5	–	2
Geneva		–		2	–	5	–	2
Carlisle		–		1	–	3	–	1
Lafayette		–		2	–	6	–	1
Bucknell		–		3	–	9	–	0
Columbia		–		1	–	5	–	2
Franklin & Marshall		–		1	–	7	–	0
Villanova		–		1	–	8	–	0

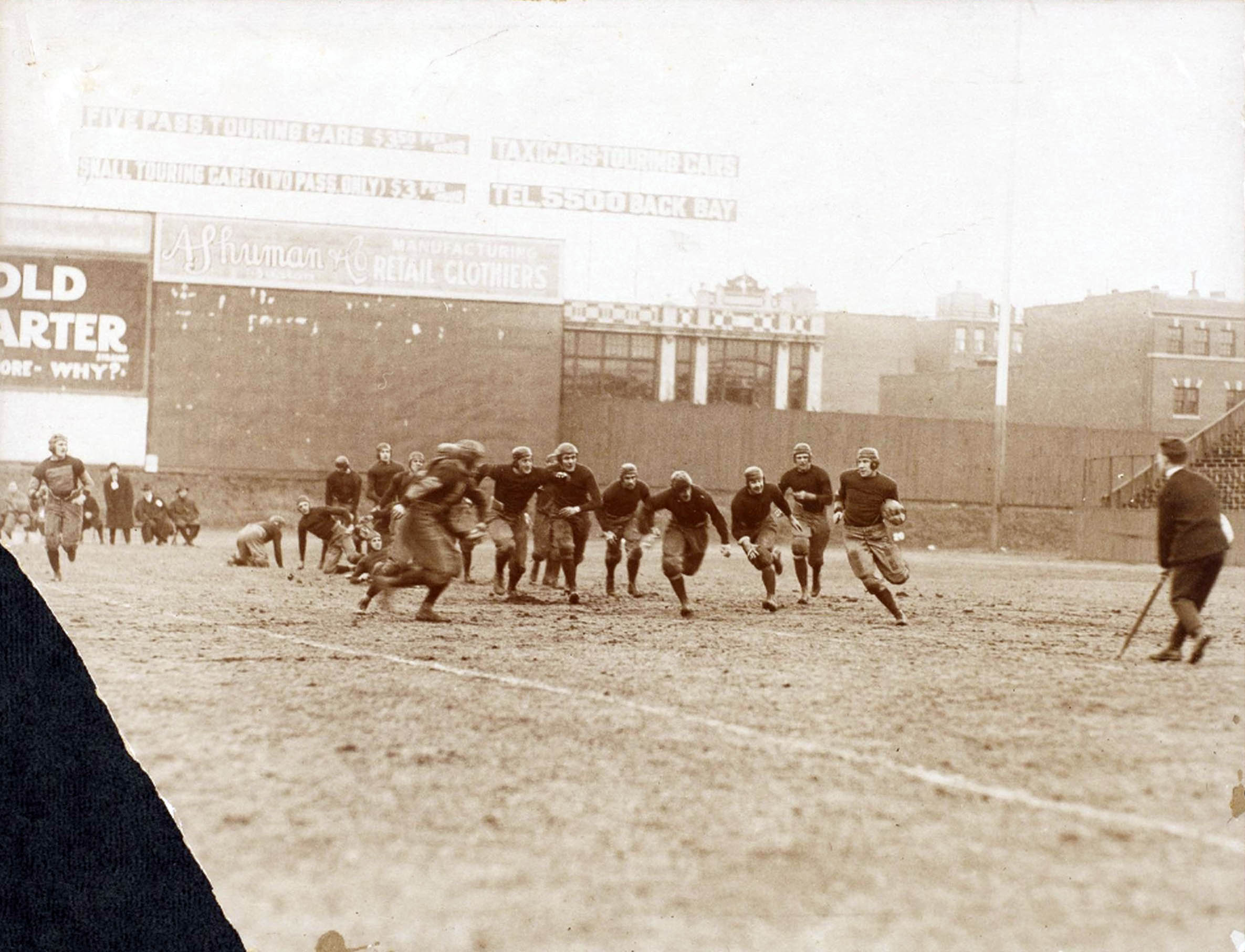
Holy Cross takes on Boston College in 1916 at Fenway Park. BC won the game, 17-14.

The 1916 Boston College football team was an American football team that represented Boston College as an independent during the 1916 college football season. Led by first-year head coach Charles Brickley, Boston College compiled a record of 6–2.

== Schedule ==
Date	Time	Opponent	Site	Result	Attendance	Source
September 23	3:00 p.m.	Neponset Wanderers	Alumni Field; Chestnut Hill, MA	W 16–0		
September 30		at Dartmouth	Alumni Oval; Hanover, NH	L 6–32		
October 12	3:00 p.m.	New Hampshire	Alumni Field; Chestnut Hill, MA	W 19–0		
October 21		at Tufts	Tufts Oval; Somerville, MA	L 0–13		
October 28		at Trinity (CT)	Hartford, CT	W 21–7		
November 4	2:30 p.m.	Rhode Island State	Alumni Field; Chestnut Hill, MA	W 39–0		
November 18	2:15 p.m.	Worcester Tech	Alumni Field; Chestnut Hill, MA	W 49–0		
December 2		Holy Cross	Fenway Park; Boston, MA (rivalry)	W 17–14	8,000	
