= 1916 Army Cadets football team =

American college football season

1916 Army Cadets football

Co-national champion (Davis)
- Conference: Independent
- Record: 9–0
- Head coach: Charles Dudley Daly (4th season)
- Captain: John McEwan
- Home stadium: The Plain

1916 Eastern college football independents records
	Conf.			Overall
Team	W	L	T	W		L		T
Army		–		9	–	0	–	0
Pittsburgh		–		8	–	0	–	0
Brown		–		8	–	1	–	0
Colgate		–		8	–	1	–	0
Yale		–		8	–	1	–	0
Fordham		–		6	–	1	–	1
Swarthmore		–		6	–	1	–	1
Penn State		–		8	–	2	–	0
Washington & Jefferson		–		8	–	2	–	0
Boston College		–		6	–	2	–	0
Cornell		–		6	–	2	–	0
Princeton		–		6	–	2	–	0
Lehigh		–		6	–	2	–	1
Dartmouth		–		5	–	2	–	2
Harvard		–		7	–	3	–	0
Penn		–		7	–	3	–	1
Temple		–		3	–	1	–	2
Tufts		–		5	–	3	–	0
Carnegie Tech		–		4	–	3	–	0
Rutgers		–		3	–	2	–	2
NYU		–		4	–	3	–	1
Syracuse		–		5	–	4	–	0
Holy Cross		–		4	–	5	–	0
Vermont		–		4	–	5	–	0
Rhode Island State		–		3	–	4	–	1
New Hampshire		–		3	–	5	–	2
Geneva		–		2	–	5	–	2
Carlisle		–		1	–	3	–	1
Lafayette		–		2	–	6	–	1
Bucknell		–		3	–	9	–	0
Columbia		–		1	–	5	–	2
Franklin & Marshall		–		1	–	7	–	0
Villanova		–		1	–	8	–	0

The 1916 Army Cadets football team represented the United States Military Academy as an independent during the 1916 college football season. In their fourth season under head coach Charles Dudley Daly, the Cadets compiled a 9–0 record and outscored all opponents by a combined total of 235 to 36. In the annual Army–Navy Game, the Cadets defeated the Midshipmen 15 to 7. The Cadets also defeated Notre Dame by a score of 30 to 10 and Villanova by a 69 to 7 score. The 1916 Army team was selected retroactively as the 1916 national champion by Parke H. Davis.

Fullback Elmer Oliphant from the 1916 Army team was a consensus first-team All-American and was later inducted into the College Football Hall of Fame in 1955. Center John McEwan received second-team honors from Walter Camp, the United Press, the International News Service, and Walter Eckersall.

== Schedule ==
Date	Opponent	Site	Result
September 30	Lebanon Valley	The Plain; West Point, NY	W 3–0
October 7	Washington & Lee	The Plain; West Point, NY	W 14–7
October 14	Holy Cross	The Plain; West Point, NY	W 17–0
October 21	Trinity (CT)	The Plain; West Point, NY	W 53–0
October 28	Villanova	The Plain; West Point, NY	W 69–7
November 4	Notre Dame	The Plain; West Point, NY (rivalry)	W 30–10
November 11	Maine	The Plain; West Point, NY	W 17–3
November 18	Springfield YMCA	The Plain; West Point, NY	W 17–2
November 25	vs. Navy	Polo Grounds; New York, NY (Army–Navy Game)	W 15–7
