= 1916 Colgate football team =

American college football season

1916 Colgate football
- Conference: Independent
- Record: 8–1
- Head coach: Laurence Bankart (5th season)
- Captain: Steamer Horning
- Home stadium: Whitnall Field

1916 Eastern college football independents records
	Conf.			Overall
Team	W	L	T	W		L		T
Army		–		9	–	0	–	0
Pittsburgh		–		8	–	0	–	0
Brown		–		8	–	1	–	0
Colgate		–		8	–	1	–	0
Yale		–		8	–	1	–	0
Fordham		–		6	–	1	–	1
Swarthmore		–		6	–	1	–	1
Penn State		–		8	–	2	–	0
Washington & Jefferson		–		8	–	2	–	0
Boston College		–		6	–	2	–	0
Cornell		–		6	–	2	–	0
Princeton		–		6	–	2	–	0
Lehigh		–		6	–	2	–	1
Dartmouth		–		5	–	2	–	2
Harvard		–		7	–	3	–	0
Penn		–		7	–	3	–	1
Temple		–		3	–	1	–	2
Tufts		–		5	–	3	–	0
Carnegie Tech		–		4	–	3	–	0
Rutgers		–		3	–	2	–	2
NYU		–		4	–	3	–	1
Syracuse		–		5	–	4	–	0
Holy Cross		–		4	–	5	–	0
Vermont		–		4	–	5	–	0
Rhode Island State		–		3	–	4	–	1
New Hampshire		–		3	–	5	–	2
Geneva		–		2	–	5	–	2
Carlisle		–		1	–	3	–	1
Lafayette		–		2	–	6	–	1
Bucknell		–		3	–	9	–	0
Columbia		–		1	–	5	–	2
Franklin & Marshall		–		1	–	7	–	0
Villanova		–		1	–	8	–	0

The 1916 Colgate football team was an American football team that represented Colgate University as an independent during the 1916 college football season. In its fifth and final season under head coach Laurence Bankart, the team compiled an 8–1 record, shut out five of its nine opponents, and outscored all opponents by a total of 218 to 30.

Three Colgate players were consensus first-team players on the 1916 All-America team:

- Quarterback Ockie Anderson. Nationally syndicated sports writer Tommy Clark not only chose Anderson as his first-team All-American quarterback but also named him captain of the All-American team. Clark explained his selection of Anderson as follows: "He is an accurate forward passer, and his passing gave Colgate the 13-0 victory over the Army last season. He is a good broken-field runner, and his running back of punts has been a feature of several games this year. He feeds his backs in faultless style, the result being that Colgate did not fumble at Yale, only once against Illinois, and that on a direct pass, and not once against Syracuse and Brown. Anderson has played against some of the best quarterbacks of the year, Macomber of Illinois, Smith of Yale, and Meehan of Syracuse. None of them outplayed him." Anderson went on to become one of the leading scorers in the first season of the NFL.
- Tackle Steamer Horning. Horning was also selected as the captain of the 1916 Colgate team. Horning later became the first Detroit quarterback in the 1920 NFL season and won All-NFL honors in 1922 and 1923.
- Tackle Belford West. West was inducted to the College Football Hall of Fame in 1954 and Colgate's athletic hall of honor in 1979. Reflecting on West's college career in 1928, John Heisman wrote, "His co-ordination was complete, his courage supreme, his sportsmanship incontestable."

In addition, guards Monroe Good and Mason Barton received second-team All-America honors from the United Press (UP) and International News Service (INS), respectively.

The team played its home games on Whitnall Field in Hamilton, New York.

== Schedule ==
Date	Opponent	Site	Result	Source
September 30	Susquehanna	Hamilton, NY	W 34–0	
October 7	Maine	Utica, NY	W 28–0	
October 14	at Illinois	Illinois Field; Champaign, IL	W 15–3	
October 21	at Rhode Island State	Hamilton, NY	W 33–0	
October 28	Springfield	Hamilton, NY	W 27–14	
November 4	at Yale	Yale Bowl; New Haven, CT	L 3–7	
November 11	Rochester	Hamilton, NY	W 35–6	
November 18	at Syracuse	Archbold Stadium; Syracuse, NY (rivalry)	W 15–0	
November 30	at Brown	Andrews Field; Providence, RI	W 28–0	
