= 1916 Brown Bears football team =

American college football season

1916 Brown Bears football
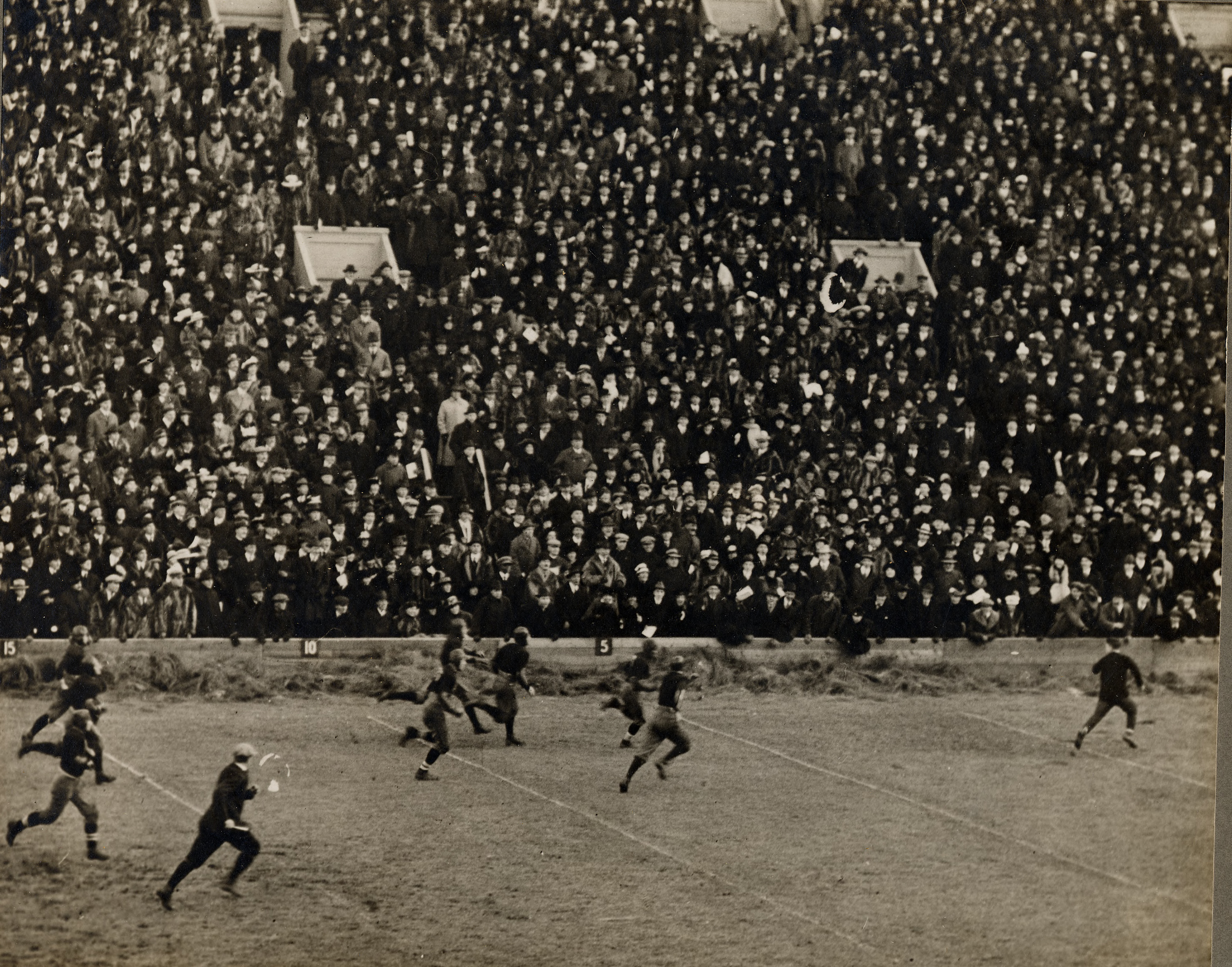
- Fritz Pollard running during the Harvard-Brown football game of 1916
- Conference: Independent
- Record: 8–1
- Head coach: Edward N. Robinson (15th season)
- Home stadium: Andrews Field

1916 Eastern college football independents records
	Conf.			Overall
Team	W	L	T	W		L		T
Army		–		9	–	0	–	0
Pittsburgh		–		8	–	0	–	0
Brown		–		8	–	1	–	0
Colgate		–		8	–	1	–	0
Yale		–		8	–	1	–	0
Fordham		–		6	–	1	–	1
Swarthmore		–		6	–	1	–	1
Penn State		–		8	–	2	–	0
Washington & Jefferson		–		8	–	2	–	0
Boston College		–		6	–	2	–	0
Cornell		–		6	–	2	–	0
Princeton		–		6	–	2	–	0
Lehigh		–		6	–	2	–	1
Dartmouth		–		5	–	2	–	2
Harvard		–		7	–	3	–	0
Penn		–		7	–	3	–	1
Temple		–		3	–	1	–	2
Tufts		–		5	–	3	–	0
Carnegie Tech		–		4	–	3	–	0
Rutgers		–		3	–	2	–	2
NYU		–		4	–	3	–	1
Syracuse		–		5	–	4	–	0
Holy Cross		–		4	–	5	–	0
Vermont		–		4	–	5	–	0
Rhode Island State		–		3	–	4	–	1
New Hampshire		–		3	–	5	–	2
Geneva		–		2	–	5	–	2
Carlisle		–		1	–	3	–	1
Lafayette		–		2	–	6	–	1
Bucknell		–		3	–	9	–	0
Columbia		–		1	–	5	–	2
Franklin & Marshall		–		1	–	7	–	0
Villanova		–		1	–	8	–	0

The 1916 Brown Bears football team was an American football team that represented Brown University as an independent during the 1916 college football season. In its 15th season under head coach Edward N. Robinson, Brown compiled an 8–1 record and outscored opponents by a total of 254 to 37. The team won its first eight games, including six shutouts and victories over Rutgers, Yale, and Harvard. In the final game of the season, played on Thanksgiving Day, Brown lost to Colgate in a cold, drenching rain that turned the field into a muddy quagmire.

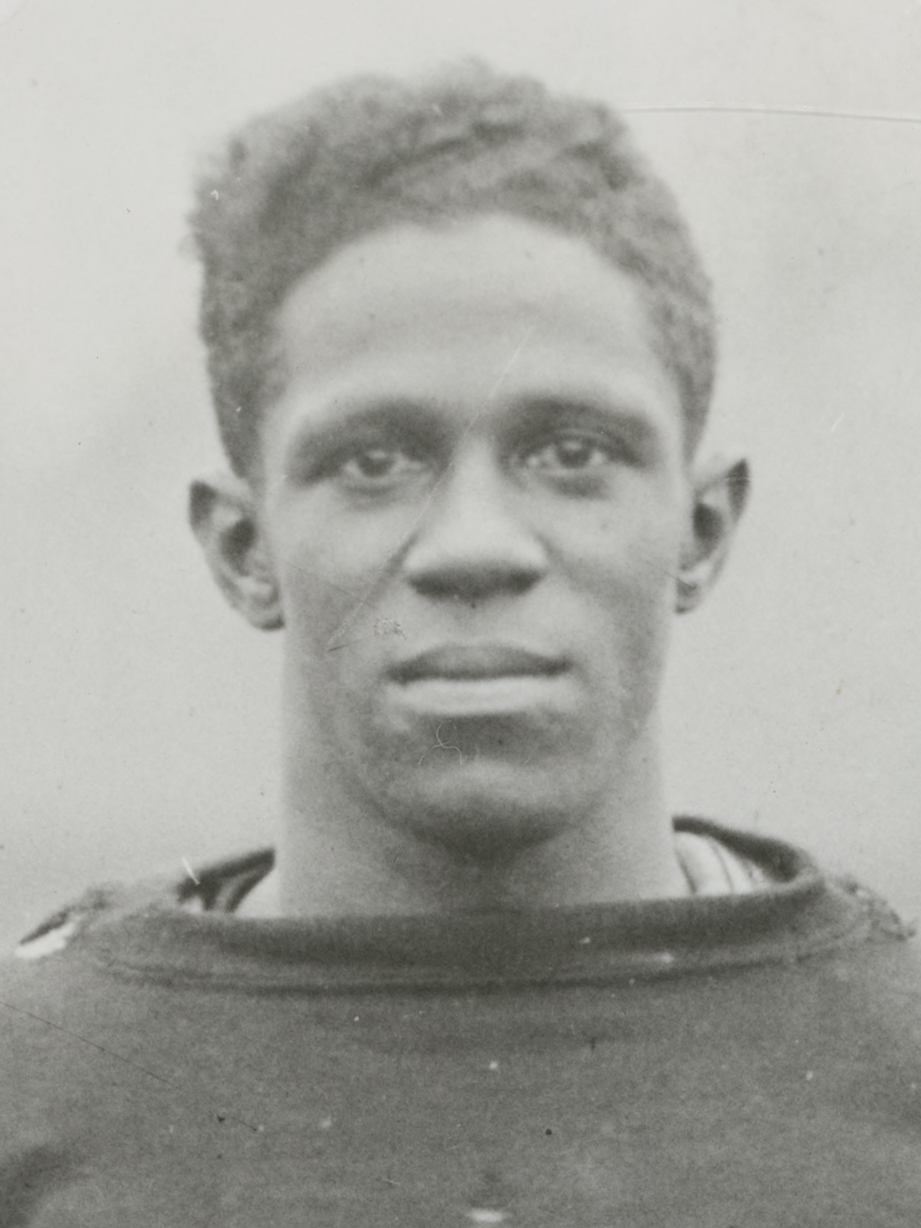
Pollard in 1916

Brown's standout player of the season was Fritz Pollard, one of the few African-Americans to star for an American football team during the largely segregated 1910s. Pollard scored 12 touchdowns and became the first African-American backfield player to be named to Walter Camp's All-America college football team. Pollard was later inducted into both the College and Pro Football Hall of Fames.

Brown played its home games at Andrews Field in Providence, Rhode Island.

== Schedule ==
Date	Opponent	Site	Result	Attendance	Source
September 30	Rhode Island State	Andrews Field; Providence, RI (rivalry)	W 18–0		
October 7	Trinity (CT)	Andrews Field; Providence, RI	W 42–0		
October 14	Amherst	Andrews Field; Providence, RI	W 69–0		
October 21	at Williams	Weston Field; Williamstown, MA	W 20–0		
October 28	Rutgers	Andrews Field; Providence, RI	W 21–3		
November 4	Vermont	Andrews Field; Providence, RI	W 42–0		
November 11	at Yale	Yale Bowl; New Haven, CT	W 21–6		
November 18	at Harvard	Harvard Stadium; Boston, MA	W 21–0	20,000	
November 30	Colgate	Andrews Field; Providence, RI (Thanksgiving)	L 0–28		
