= 1916 college football season =

American college football season

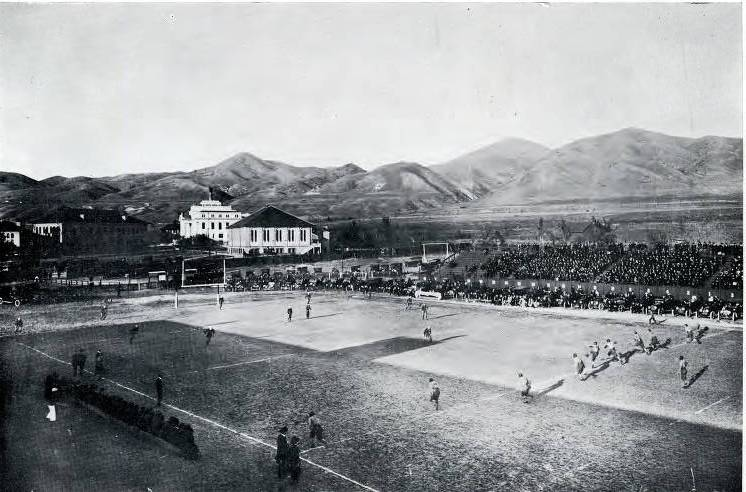
- Colorado–Utah kickoff
- Number of bowls: 1
- Champion(s): Army; Pittsburgh

The 1916 college football season had no clear-cut champion, with the Official NCAA Division I Football Records Book listing Army and Pittsburgh as national champions. Both Army and Pittsburgh claim a national championship for the 1916 season. Georgetown led the nation in scoring with 464 points.

== Conference changes ==
- Two conferences began play in 1916:
  - Pacific Coast Conference – a precursor to the modern Pac-12 Conference; four founding members from California, Oregon, and Washington.
  - Nebraska Intercollegiate Conference – an NAIA conference active through the 1976 season
- One conference played its final season in 1916:
  - Kentucky Intercollegiate Athletic Association – active since the 1914 season; several members subsequently joined the Kentucky Intercollegiate Athletic Conference, an active NAIA conference now known as the River States Conference

=== Membership changes ===
School	1915 Conference	1916 Conference
California Golden Bears	Independent	PCC
Georgetown Tigers	Independent	SIAA
Georgia Tech Yellow Jackets	Independent	SIAA
Oregon Webfoots	Independent	PCC
Oregon Agricultural Beavers	Independent	PCC
South Carolina Gamecocks	Independent	SIAA
Washington Huskies	Independent	PCC
William & Mary Orange and Black	Independent	SAIAA

== Large scores ==
Georgia Tech defeated Cumberland 222 to 0. Sewanee also beat Cumberland 107 to 0.

== Rose Bowl ==
Oregon defeated Penn, 14–0, in the 1917 Rose Bowl.

== Conference standings ==
=== Major conference standings ===
1916 Missouri Valley Conference football standings
	Conf.					Overall
Team	W		L		T	W		L		T
Nebraska $	3	–	1	–	0	6	–	2	–	0
Missouri	3	–	1	–	1	6	–	1	–	1
Iowa State	2	–	1	–	1	5	–	2	–	1
Kansas State	1	–	1	–	1	6	–	1	–	1
Kansas	1	–	2	–	1	4	–	3	–	1
Drake	1	–	3	–	0	3	–	5	–	0
Washington University	0	–	2	–	0	3	–	3	–	1
$ – Conference champion

1916 Northwest Conference football standings
	Conf.					Overall
Team	W		L		T	W		L		T
Washington +	2	–	0	–	1	6	–	0	–	1
Oregon +	2	–	0	–	1	7	–	0	–	1
Oregon Agricultural	3	–	2	–	0	4	–	5	–	0
Washington State	2	–	2	–	0	4	–	2	–	0
Whitman	1	–	3	–	0	1	–	5	–	0
Idaho	0	–	3	–	0	3	–	5	–	0
+ – Conference co-champions

1916 Pacific Coast Conference football standings
	Conf.					Overall
Team	W		L		T	W		L		T
Washington +	3	–	0	–	1	6	–	0	–	1
Oregon ^ +	2	–	0	–	1	7	–	0	–	1
Oregon Agricultural	0	–	2	–	0	4	–	5	–	0
California	0	–	3	–	0	6	–	4	–	1
+ – Conference co-champions; ^ – Selected as Rose Bowl representative

1916 Rocky Mountain Conference football standings
	Conf.					Overall
Team	W		L		T	W		L		T
Colorado Agricultural $	6	–	0	–	1	6	–	0	–	1
Colorado College	4	–	1	–	0	6	–	1	–	0
Denver	3	–	2	–	0	4	–	2	–	1
Utah	2	–	2	–	0	3	–	2	–	0
Colorado Mines	2	–	2	–	1	3	–	2	–	1
Wyoming	1	–	4	–	0	1	–	4	–	0
Colorado	1	–	5	–	0	1	–	5	–	1
Utah Agricultural	0	–	4	–	0	1	–	5	–	1
$ – Conference champion

1916 South Atlantic Intercollegiate Athletic Association football standings
	Conf.					Overall
Team	W		L		T	W		L		T
VPI $	4	–	0	–	0	7	–	2	–	0
Georgetown	2	–	0	–	0	8	–	1	–	0
Washington and Lee	1	–	0	–	0	5	–	2	–	2
George Washington	2	–	1	–	0	3	–	3	–	1
North Carolina	2	–	1	–	0	5	–	4	–	0
Catholic University	2	–	1	–	0	4	–	4	–	0
Virginia	2	–	1	–	0	4	–	5	–	0
Davidson	1	–	2	–	0	5	–	3	–	1
Richmond	1	–	3	–	1	5	–	4	–	2
VMI	1	–	4	–	0	4	–	5	–	0
St. John's (MD)	0	–	1	–	0	0	–	1	–	0
William & Mary	0	–	2	–	1	2	–	5	–	2
Johns Hopkins	0	–	2	–	0	0	–	2	–	0
North Carolina A&M	0	–	4	–	0	2	–	5	–	0
$ – Conference champion

1916 Southern Intercollegiate Athletic Association football standings
	Conf.					Overall
Team	W		L		T	W		L		T
Georgia Tech +	5	–	0	–	0	8	–	0	–	1
Tennessee +	6	–	0	–	1	8	–	0	–	1
Vanderbilt	4	–	1	–	1	7	–	1	–	1
LSU	3	–	1	–	1	7	–	1	–	2
The Citadel	3	–	1	–	0	6	–	1	–	1
Tulane	2	–	1	–	1	4	–	3	–	1
Kentucky	2	–	1	–	2	4	–	1	–	2
Auburn	6	–	2	–	0	6	–	2	–	0
Georgia	5	–	2	–	0	6	–	3	–	0
Alabama	4	–	3	–	0	6	–	3	–	0
Sewanee	2	–	2	–	2	5	–	2	–	2
Centre	1	–	1	–	1	5	–	1	–	3
Howard (AL)	1	–	1	–	0	6	–	4	–	0
Georgetown (KY)	1	–	1	–	0	2	–	1	–	0
Mississippi A&M	3	–	4	–	0	4	–	4	–	1
Transylvania	2	–	3	–	1	3	–	3	–	2
Mississippi College	2	–	3	–	0	6	–	3	–	0
Clemson	2	–	4	–	0	3	–	6	–	0
South Carolina	2	–	4	–	0	2	–	7	–	0
Wofford	1	–	2	–	0	2	–	7	–	0
Louisville	1	–	2	–	1	2	–	3	–	1
Furman	1	–	3	–	0	4	–	5	–	0
Chattanooga	1	–	4	–	0	3	–	5	–	0
Florida	0	–	4	–	0	0	–	5	–	0
Mercer	0	–	5	–	0	1	–	6	–	0
Ole Miss	0	–	6	–	0	3	–	6	–	0
+ – Conference co-champions

1916 Southwest Conference football standings
	Conf.					Overall
Team	W		L		T	W		L		T
Texas	5	–	1	–	0	7	–	2	–	0
Baylor	3	–	1	–	0	9	–	1	–	0
Rice	2	–	1	–	0	6	–	1	–	2
Oklahoma	2	–	1	–	0	6	–	5	–	0
Texas A&M	1	–	2	–	0	6	–	3	–	0
Arkansas	0	–	2	–	0	4	–	4	–	0
Oklahoma A&M	0	–	3	–	0	4	–	4	–	0
Southwestern (TX)	0	–	4	–	0	3	–	5	–	1
No champion recognized

1916 Western Conference football standings
	Conf.					Overall
Team	W		L		T	W		L		T
Ohio State $	4	–	0	–	0	7	–	0	–	0
Northwestern	4	–	1	–	0	6	–	1	–	0
Minnesota	3	–	1	–	0	6	–	1	–	0
Chicago	3	–	3	–	0	3	–	4	–	0
Illinois	2	–	2	–	1	3	–	3	–	1
Wisconsin	1	–	2	–	1	4	–	2	–	1
Iowa	1	–	2	–	0	4	–	3	–	0
Indiana	0	–	3	–	1	2	–	4	–	1
Purdue	0	–	4	–	1	2	–	4	–	1
$ – Conference champion

=== Independents ===
1916 Eastern college football independents records
	Conf.			Overall
Team	W	L	T	W		L		T
Army		–		9	–	0	–	0
Pittsburgh		–		8	–	0	–	0
Brown		–		8	–	1	–	0
Colgate		–		8	–	1	–	0
Yale		–		8	–	1	–	0
Fordham		–		6	–	1	–	1
Swarthmore		–		6	–	1	–	1
Penn State		–		8	–	2	–	0
Washington & Jefferson		–		8	–	2	–	0
Boston College		–		6	–	2	–	0
Cornell		–		6	–	2	–	0
Princeton		–		6	–	2	–	0
Lehigh		–		6	–	2	–	1
Dartmouth		–		5	–	2	–	2
Harvard		–		7	–	3	–	0
Penn		–		7	–	3	–	1
Temple		–		3	–	1	–	2
Tufts		–		5	–	3	–	0
Carnegie Tech		–		4	–	3	–	0
Rutgers		–		3	–	2	–	2
NYU		–		4	–	3	–	1
Syracuse		–		5	–	4	–	0
Holy Cross		–		4	–	5	–	0
Vermont		–		4	–	5	–	0
Rhode Island State		–		3	–	4	–	1
New Hampshire		–		3	–	5	–	2
Geneva		–		2	–	5	–	2
Carlisle		–		1	–	3	–	1
Lafayette		–		2	–	6	–	1
Bucknell		–		3	–	9	–	0
Columbia		–		1	–	5	–	2
Franklin & Marshall		–		1	–	7	–	0
Villanova		–		1	–	8	–	0

1916 Midwestern college football independents records
	Conf.			Overall
Team	W	L	T	W		L		T
St. Xavier		–		5	–	0	–	0
Notre Dame		–		8	–	1	–	0
Western State Normal		–		5	–	1	–	0
Northern Illinois State		–		6	–	1	–	1
Heidelberg		–		8	–	2	–	0
Michigan		–		7	–	2	–	0
Wabash		–		7	–	2	–	0
Michigan Agricultural		–		4	–	2	–	1
North Dakota Agricultural		–		3	–	2	–	1
Detroit		–		3	–	2	–	2
St. Mary's (OH)		–		4	–	3	–	0
Marquette		–		4	–	3	–	1
Saint Louis		–		4	–	4	–	0
Haskell		–		3	–	6	–	0
Michigan State Normal		–		1	–	2	–	1
South Dakota		–		1	–	5	–	2
Akron		–		2	–	7	–	0
Central Michigan		–		1	–	5	–	0
Iowa State Teachers		–		1	–	7	–	0
Lake Forest		–		1	–	7	–	0

1916 Southern college football independents records
	Conf.			Overall
Team	W	L	T	W		L		T
Birmingham		–		7	–	1	–	0
Southwestern Louisiana Industrial		–		7	–	1	–	0
Maryland State		–		6	–	2	–	0
Marshall		–		7	–	2	–	1
Stetson		–		3	–	1	–	0
Middle Tennessee State Normal		–		5	–	2	–	0
Sam Houston Normal		–		5	–	2	–	0
Spring Hill		–		4	–	2	–	0
West Virginia		–		5	–	2	–	2
Navy		–		6	–	3	–	1
Southwest Texas State		–		3	–	1	–	3
Presbyterian		–		4	–	3	–	0
Delaware		–		4	–	3	–	1
North Texas State Normal		–		4	–	3	–	1
Western Kentucky State Normal		–		3	–	2	–	0
George Washington		–		3	–	3	–	1
Wake Forest		–		3	–	3	–	0
Louisville		–		2	–	3	–	1
West Tennessee State Normal		–		2	–	3	–	1
Texas Mines		–		2	–	3	–	0
Tusculum		–		2	–	3	–	0
Cumberland (TN)		–		0	–	2	–	0

1916 Western college football independents records
	Conf.			Overall
Team	W	L	T	W		L		T
Santa Clara		–		10	–	0	–	0
University Farm		–		6	–	1	–	1
Montana		–		4	–	1	–	1
Arizona		–		5	–	3	–	0
USC		–		5	–	3	–	0
New Mexico		–		3	–	2	–	0
Hawaii		–		3	–	2	–	1
Saint Mary's		–		5	–	4	–	1
Montana State		–		2	–	2	–	2
Nevada		–		3	–	5	–	0
Tempe Normal		–		0	–	3	–	0

=== Minor conferences ===
Conference	Champion(s)	Record
Central Intercollegiate Athletics Association	Hampton Institute	3–0
Indiana College Athletic League	Wabash	—
Inter-Normal Athletic Conference of Wisconsin	River Falls Normal	5–0
Kansas Collegiate Athletic Conference	Kansas State Normal	5–1–1
Kentucky Intercollegiate Athletic Association	Centre (KY)	—
Louisiana Intercollegiate Athletic Association	Southwestern Louisiana Industrial	5–0
Michigan Intercollegiate Athletic Association	Kalamazoo	4–0
Nebraska Intercollegiate Conference	York (NE)	7–0
Ohio Athletic Conference	Miami (OH)	6–0–1
Oklahoma Intercollegiate Conference	Kendall	4–0
Southern California Intercollegiate Athletic Conference	Occidental; Whittier	3–0–1
Southern Intercollegiate Athletic Conference	Fisk	—

=== Minor conference standings ===
1916 Colored Intercollegiate Athletic Association football standings
	Conf.					Overall
Team	W		L		T	W		L		T
Hampton $	3	–	0	–	0	4	–	0	–	0
Howard	2	–	1	–	0	5	–	1	–	2
Virginia Union	1	–	2	–	0	2	–	2	–	0
Lincoln (PA)	0	–	3	–	0	2	–	3	–	0
$ – Conference champion

1916 Eastern Virginia Intercollegiate Athletic Association football standings
	Conf.					Overall
Team	W		L		T	W		L		T
Richmond +	4	–	1	–	2	5	–	2	–	2
Hampden–Sydney +	4	–	1	–	2	6	–	3	–	2
Randolph–Macon	1	–	4	–	1	1	–	7	–	1
William & Mary	1	–	4	–	1	2	–	5	–	2
+ – Conference co-champions

1916 Illinois Intercollegiate Athletic Conference football standings
	Conf.					Overall
Team	W		L		T	W		L		T
Carthage	2	–	2	–	0	2	–	5	–	0
Southern Illinois			–			0	–	7	–	0

1916 Kansas Collegiate Athletic Conference football standings
	Conf.					Overall
Team	W		L		T	W		L		T
Kansas State Normal $	5	–	1	–	1	6	–	3	–	1
Hays Normal	4	–	1	–	0	5	–	2	–	0
Southwestern (KS)	6	–	2	–	0	6	–	3	–	0
Pittsburg Normal	3	–	1	–	0	7	–	3	–	0
Fairmount	7	–	3	–	0	7	–	3	–	0
Cooper	6	–	3	–	0	6	–	3	–	0
Baker	4	–	2	–	1	4	–	4	–	1
Friends	3	–	2	–	2	3	–	4	–	2
Washburn	3	–	4	–	0	3	–	6	–	0
St. Mary's (KS)	2	–	3	–	1	4	–	3	–	1
College of Emporia	3	–	5	–	0	3	–	5	–	0
Ottawa	2	–	5	–	2	2	–	5	–	2
Bethany (KS)	2	–	5	–	1	2	–	6	–	1
Midland	0	–	3	–	0	3	–	5	–	0
Bethel (KS)	0	–	3	–	0	0	–	3	–	0
Kansas Wesleyan	0	–	7	–	0	0	–	8	–	0
$ – Conference champion

1916 Missouri Intercollegiate Athletic Association football standings
	Conf.					Overall
Team	W		L		T	W		L		T
Kirksville Normal $	6	–	0	–	1	7	–	0	–	1
William Jewell	6	–	1	–	0	8	–	1	–	0
Central (MO)	3	–	2	–	0	3	–	3	–	0
Springfield Normal	1	–	1	–	2	2	–	2	–	2
Missouri Wesleyan	2	–	3	–	0	?	–	?	–	?
Drury	1	–	2	–	1	4	–	3	–	1
Tarkio	1	–	2	–	1	3	–	3	–	1
Westminster (MO)	2	–	4	–	1	2	–	4	–	1
Missouri Valley	0	–	2	–	0	?	–	?	–	?
Maryville Normal	0	–	5	–	0	2	–	5	–	0
$ – Conference champion

1916 Ohio Athletic Conference football standings
	Conf.					Overall
Team	W		L		T	W		L		T
Miami (OH) $	6	–	0	–	1	7	–	0	–	1
Mount Union	6	–	1	–	0	8	–	2	–	0
Denison	5	–	0	–	2	5	–	1	–	2
Ohio	4	–	1	–	1	5	–	2	–	1
Wooster	5	–	2	–	0	6	–	2	–	0
Case	4	–	3	–	0	5	–	5	–	0
Ohio Wesleyan	2	–	2	–	2	2	–	3	–	2
Western Reserve	3	–	4	–	0	3	–	7	–	0
Akron	2	–	4	–	0	2	–	7	–	0
Ohio Northern	2	–	5	–	0	3	–	7	–	0
Kenyon	2	–	5	–	0	2	–	7	–	0
Wittenberg	0	–	5	–	1	2	–	5	–	2
Cincinnati	0	–	6	–	1	0	–	8	–	2
Baldwin–Wallace	0	–	1	–	0	0	–	2	–	0
Oberlin	0	–	5	–	0	0	–	7	–	0
Ohio State *	3	–	0	–	0	7	–	0	–	0
$ – Conference champion; * – did not complete for championship

1916 Southern California Conference football standings
	Conf.					Overall
Team	W		L		T	W		L		T
Occidental +	3	–	0	–	1	6	–	0	–	1
Whittier +	3	–	0	–	1	4	–	1	–	1
Pomona	2	–	2	–	0	4	–	3	–	0
Redlands	1	–	3	–	0	4	–	3	–	0
Throop	0	–	4	–	0	1	–	5	–	0
+ – Conference co-champions

1916 Wisconsin Normal Athletic Conference football standings
	Conf.					Overall
Team	W		L		T	W		L		T
River Falls Normal $	5	–	0	–	0	7	–	0	–	1
Milwaukee Normal	3	–	1	–	0	4	–	4	–	0
Stevens Point Normal	2	–	1	–	0	5	–	1	–	1
Whitewater Normal	2	–	1	–	0	4	–	1	–	1
La Crosse Normal	1	–	2	–	0	4	–	2	–	0
Platteville Normal	1	–	2	–	0	2	–	5	–	0
Stout Normal	0	–	1	–	0	4	–	3	–	0
Superior Normal	0	–	3	–	0	2	–	3	–	1
Oshkosh Normal	0	–	3	–	0	0	–	5	–	0
$ – Conference champion

== Awards and honors ==
=== All-Americans ===
The consensus All-America team included:

Position	Name	Height	Weight (lbs.)	Class	Hometown	Team
QB	Ockie Anderson	5'9"	165	Sr.	Erie, Pennsylvania	Colgate
HB	Chic Harley	5'11"	171	So.	Chicago, Illinois	Ohio State
HB	Fritz Pollard	5'9"	165	Sr.	Chicago, Illinois	Brown
FB	Elmer Oliphant	5'7"	180	Jr.	Bloomfield, Indiana	Army
E	Bert Baston	6'1"	170	Sr.	St. Louis Park, Minnesota	Minnesota
T	Belford West	6'2"	195	Sr.	Hamilton, New York	Colgate
G	Clinton Black			Sr.	New York, New York	Yale
G	Harrie Dadmun	6'0"	235	Sr.	Cambridge, Massachusetts	Harvard
C	Bob Peck	5'9"	179	Jr.	Lock Haven, Pennsylvania	Pittsburgh
G	Frank T. Hogg	6'2"	193	Sr.	Pittsburgh, Pennsylvania	Princeton
T	Steamer Horning			Sr.	Phoenix, New York	Colgate
E	James P. Herron			Sr.	New Kensington, Pennsylvania	Pittsburgh

== Statistical leaders ==
- Team scoring most points: Georgetown, 464 to 32. (including mid majors, Tulsa 566 to 40)
- Player scoring most points: Johnny Gilroy, Georgetown, 160
