= 1916 Michigan Wolverines football team =

American college football season

1916 Michigan Wolverines football
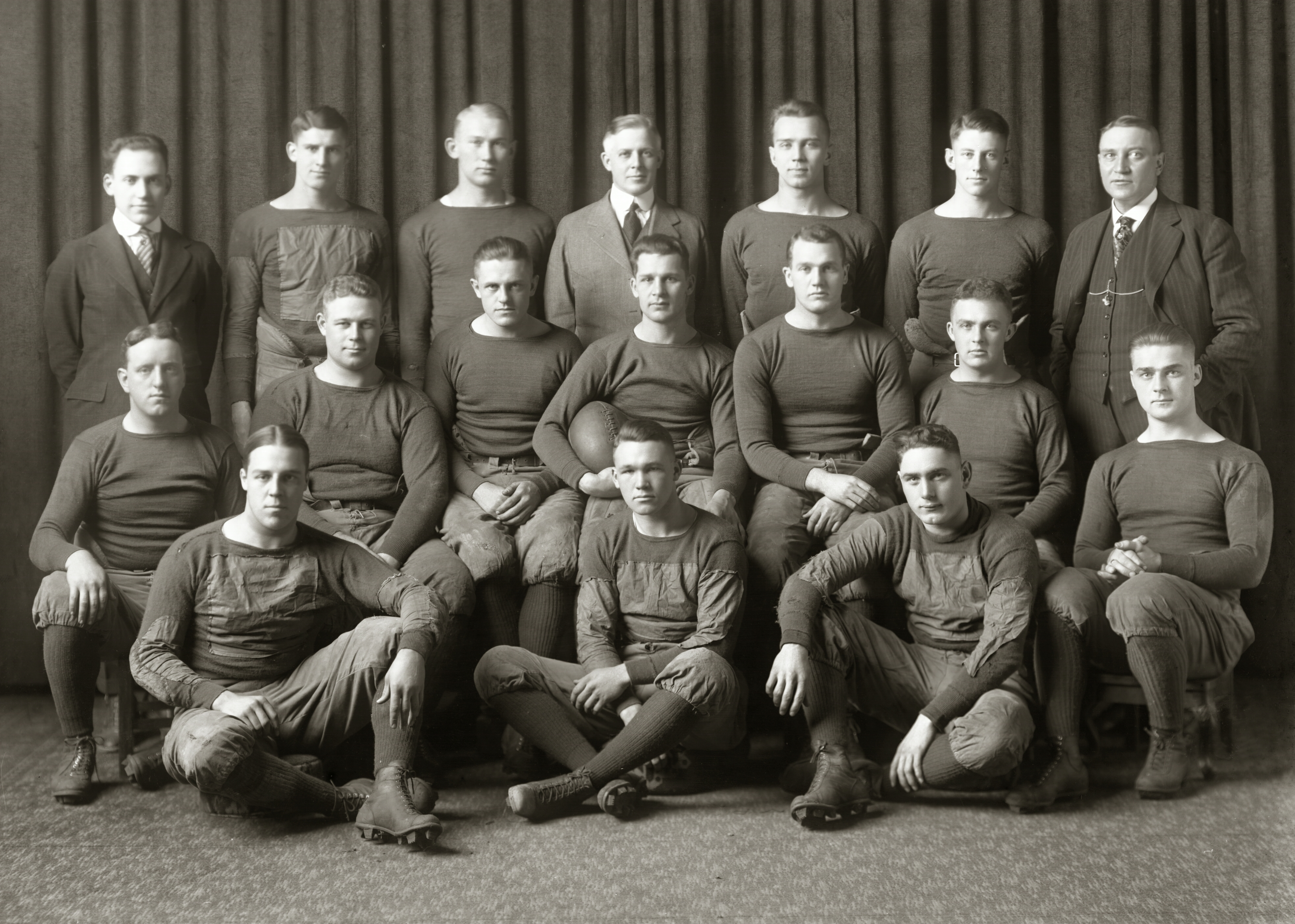
- Conference: Independent
- Record: 7–2
- Head coach: Fielding H. Yost (16th season)
- Captain: John Maulbetsch
- Home stadium: Ferry Field

Uniform
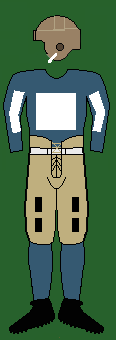

1916 Midwestern college football independents records
	Conf.			Overall
Team	W	L	T	W		L		T
St. Xavier		–		5	–	0	–	0
Notre Dame		–		8	–	1	–	0
Western State Normal		–		5	–	1	–	0
Northern Illinois State		–		6	–	1	–	1
Heidelberg		–		8	–	2	–	0
Michigan		–		7	–	2	–	0
Wabash		–		7	–	2	–	0
Michigan Agricultural		–		4	–	2	–	1
North Dakota Agricultural		–		3	–	2	–	1
Detroit		–		3	–	2	–	2
St. Mary's (OH)		–		4	–	3	–	0
Marquette		–		4	–	3	–	1
Saint Louis		–		4	–	4	–	0
Haskell		–		3	–	6	–	0
Michigan State Normal		–		1	–	2	–	1
South Dakota		–		1	–	5	–	2
Akron		–		2	–	7	–	0
Central Michigan		–		1	–	5	–	0
Iowa State Teachers		–		1	–	7	–	0
Lake Forest		–		1	–	7	–	0

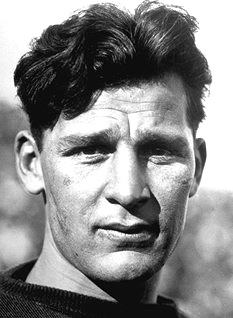
Team captain and left halfback John Maulbetsch led the team in scoring with 89 points.

The 1916 Michigan Wolverines football team represented the University of Michigan as an independent during the 1916 college football season. In his 16th year as head coach, Fielding H. Yost led Michigan to a 7–2 record, as the Wolverines outscored their opponents by a combined score of 253 to 56. Michigan held its first five opponents to a combined total of three points and won its first seven games by a combined score of 227 to 23. The team then lost its final two games, each game by a margin of only three points, against Cornell and Penn.

Michigan's leading scorer was left halfback John Maulbetsch with 89 kicks for on 11 touchdowns, 20 points after touchdown (PAT) and a field goal. Maulbetsch was also the team's captain. Quarterback Cliff Sparks added 40 points on six touchdowns, one field goal and one PAT. New York sports writer Monty selected Sparks as the first-team quarterback on his 1916 College Football All-America Team.

== Schedule ==
Date	Opponent	Site	Result	Attendance
October 4	Marietta	Ferry Field; Ann Arbor, MI	W 38–0	
October 7	Case	Ferry Field; Ann Arbor, MI	W 19–3	2,906
October 11	Carroll (WI)	Ferry Field; Ann Arbor, MI	W 54–0	
October 14	Mount Union	Ferry Field; Ann Arbor, MI	W 26–0	
October 21	Michigan Agricultural	Ferry Field; Ann Arbor, MI (rivalry)	W 9–0	22,000
October 28	Syracuse	Ferry Field; Ann Arbor, MI	W 14–13	
November 4	Washington University	Ferry Field; Ann Arbor, MI	W 66–7	
November 11	at Cornell	Schoellkopf Field; Ithaca, NY	L 20–23	6,000
November 18	Penn^{†}	Ferry Field; Ann Arbor, MI	L 7–10	25,584
^{†}Homecoming

== Season summary ==
=== Week 1: Marietta ===
Week 1: Marietta at Michigan

Team	1	2	3	4	Total
Marietta	0	0	0	0	0
• Michigan	7	14	7	10	38

- Date: October 4, 1916
- Location: Ferry Field
  Ann Arbor, MI
- Referee: Walter Kennedy (Chicago)

On Wednesday, October 4, 1916, Michigan opened its season with a game at Ferry Field against Marietta College from Marietta, Ohio. The game was the second and final game against the Marietta Pioneers football team, with Michigan having defeated the Pioneers by a 28–6 score in 1915.

Michigan defeated Marietta in the 1916 match by a 38–0 score. Quarterback Cliff Sparks scored three touchdownsF. The Detroit Free Press characterized Sparks' running as "one of the big features of the game." Left halfback John Maulbetsch scored a touchdown, kicked a field goal from placement, and converted four of four attempts at kicks for point after touchdown (PAT) for a total of 13 points. Philip Raymond also scored a touchdown, and Frank Willard kicked a PAT. Marietta relied heavily on the forward pass and did so with some success. Early in the game, Marietta completed a pass, Whiting to Hayes, for a gain of 55 yards before being tackled by Sparks.

The game was played in 12-minute quarters. Michigan's starting lineup against Marietta was Maurice Dunne (left end), James Whalen (left tackle), Fred Rehor (left guard), Walter Niemann (center), R. Glenn Dunn (right guard), Richard Weske (right tackle), Willard Peach (right end), Cliff Sparks (quarterback), John Maulbetsch (left halfback), James Sharpe (right halfback), and Cedric "Pat" Smith (fullback). Substitutes appearing in the game for Michigan were Harry McCallum (left tackle), Albert Martens (left end), John Orton Goodsell (right guard), Frank Willard (center), Clifford Gracey (right tackle), Philip Raymond (fullback), Harold Zeiger (quarterback), Donald Bathrick (right halfback) Walter Johnson (right halfback), Clarence Skinner (left tackle), Hoyne Howe (right end), Orva Williams (left guard), Edward Biber (right guard), and N. J. Brazell (left halfback).

=== Week 2: Case ===
Week 2: Case at Michigan

Team	1	2	3	4	Total
Case	3	0	0	0	3
• Michigan	6	6	0	7	19

- Date: October 7, 1916
- Location: Ferry Field
  Ann Arbor, MI
- Referee: Kennedy (Chicago)

On Saturday, October 7, 1916, Michigan played its annual game against the team from Case Institute of Technology in Cleveland. The game was the 20th meeting between the schools in a series dating back to 1894. In the 19 prior meetings, Michigan won 18 games and played to a tie once.

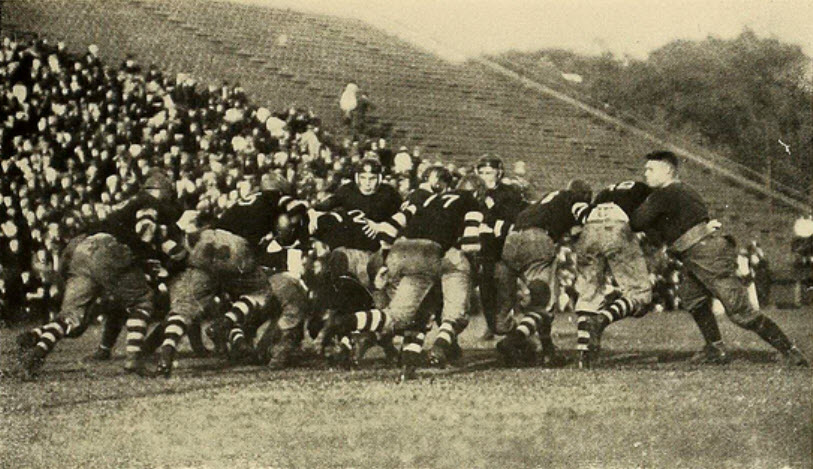
Michigan battling Case

Michigan won the 1916 game by a 19–3 score. Case took the lead in the first quarter on a field goal from placement by Ashbaugh and led briefly. After Case scored, Michigan scored on its next drive. The drive featured a 25-yard run around left end by quarterback Cliff Sparks, a 15-yard run by left halfback John Maulbetsch, and a final touchdown plunge by fullback Cedric "Pat" Smith. In the second quarter, Maulbetsch helped set up the second score with a 30-yard punt return. A forward pass from Sparks to Maurice Dunne advanced the ball to the Case 20-yard line, and Sparks then ran around the left end for the touchdown. Michigan missed on both of its PAT attempts in the first half and led 12 to 3 at halftime. In the third quarter, Sparks returned a punt 60 yards, but fullback Philip Raymond fumbled after the ball had been advanced to the five-yard line. After an interception in the fourth quarter, Maulbetsch scored Michigan's final touchdown and kicked the PAT.

Sparks was recognized as the star of the game. He ran for 115 yards in the game and set up a touchdown with a pass to left end Maurice Dunne for a 40-yard gain. The Detroit Free Press wrote: "The individual work of Sparks in his open field running and all-around generalship easily stood out as the brightest feature to the somewhat disappointing tussle." The Michigan Alumnus wrote of Sparks: "[H]e looks like the real find of the season. He was the hardest man on the team to stop, and his dodging runs from punt formation gained many yards for Michigan."

The game was played in 12 1/2-minute quarters. Michigan's starting lineup against Case was Dunne (left end), James Whalen (left tackle), Fred Rehor (left guard), Walter Niemann (center), R. Glenn Dunn (right guard), Richard Weske (right tackle), Willard Peach (right end), Sparks (quarterback), Maulbetsch (left halfback), Donald Bathrick (right halfback), and Smith (fullback). Substitutes appearing in the game for Michigan were N. J. Brazell (right halfback), Albert Martens (left end), Philip Raymond (fullback), James Sharpe (right halfback), Frank Willard (center), and Harry McCallum (left tackle).

=== Week 3: Carroll ===
Week 3: Carroll at Michigan

Team	1	2	3	4	Total
Carroll College	0	0	0	0	0
• Michigan	20	14	13	7	54

- Date: October 11, 1916
- Location: Ferry Field
  Ann Arbor, MI
- Referee: Snyder (Harvard)

On Wednesday, October 11, 1916, Michigan played its second mid-week game against the football team from Carroll College in Waukesha, Wisconsin. The game was the first and only meeting between the schools.

Quarterback Cliff Sparks, playing only in the first half, scored two touchdowns, "circled the ends at will", averaged almost 20 yards per carry when running from punt formation, and threw a 25-yard pass to left end Maurice Dunne. Dunne caught three passes in the game, including one in the second half that was good for a touchdown. Additional touchdowns were scored by John Maulbetsch, N. J. Brazell, Joseph Hanish, Harold Zeiger, and Philip Raymond. Maulbetsch also successfully converted six of eight kicks for points after touchdown, and Zeiger returned a punt 47 yards in the second half. Carroll did not manage its first and only first down until the fourth quarter against Michigan's substitutes. The game was played in quarters lasting 12, 12, 10 and 5 minutes. As the game lasted only 39 minutes, Michigan scored an average almost 1 1/2 points per minute.

Michigan's starting lineup against Carroll was Dunne (left end), Tad Wieman (left tackle), Alan Boyd (left guard), Walter Niemann (center), John Ortonn Goodsell (right guard), Richard Weske (right tackle), Willard Peach (right end), Sparks (quarterback), Maulbetsch (left halfback), Brazell (right halfback), and Philip Raymond (fullback). Substitutes appearing in the game for Michigan included Albert Martens (right end), Hanish (fullback), Zeiger (quarterback), Cedric "Pat" Smith (fullback), Frank Willard (center), Donald Bathrick, Clarence Skinner (right guard), Roland G. Dunn (right guard), Alvin Loucks (left end), Edward Biber (left halfback), and Harry McCallum (left tackle). Smith did not start due to a sprained finger. Fred Rehor was held out of the game due to a minor injury sustained during a practice scrimmage.

=== Week 4: Mount Union ===
Week 4: Mount Union at Michigan

Team	1	2	3	4	Total
Mount Union	0	0	0	0	0
• Michigan	6	6	7	7	26

- Date: October 14, 1916
- Location: Ferry Field
  Ann Arbor, MI
- Referee: Snyder (Harvard)

On Saturday, October 14, 1916, Michigan played the football team Mount Union College of Alliance, Ohio. The game was the fourth game between the two schools since 1913, with Michigan winning the prior games by a combined score of 76 to 7.

Michigan won the 1916 game at Ferry Field by a 26–0 score. Michigan touchdowns were scored by left halfback John Maulbetsch, center Walter Niemann, right halfback N. J. Brazell, and fullback Cedric "Pat" Smith. Maulbetsch and Frank Willard each kicked one point after touchdown. Brazell's touchdown came on an interception that he returned 65 yards. Nieman's touchdown came when he recovered Maulbetsch's fumble across the goal line.

The game was played in 15-minute quarters. Michigan's starting lineup against Mount Union was Maurice Dunne (left end), Tad Wieman (left tackle), Alan Boyd (left guard), Niemann (center), Fred Rehor (right guard), Richard Weske (right tackle), Willard Peach (right end), Sparks (quarterback), Maulbetsch (left halfback), Harold Zeiger (right halfback), and Joseph Hanish (fullback). Substitutes appearing in the game for Michigan were Smith (fullback), Brazell (right halfback), John Orton Goodsell (left guard), Albert Martens (left end), Philip Raymond (fullback), Sidney Eggert (left halfback), Frank Willard (center), James Whalen (right tackle), Clifford Gracey (right guard), Harry McCallum (left tackle), Alvin Loucks (right end), and Clarence Skinner (left guard).

=== Week 5: Michigan Agricultural ===
Week 5: Michigan Agricultural at Michigan

Team	1	2	3	4	Total
Michigan Agricultural	0	0	0	0	0
• Michigan	3	0	0	6	9

- Date: October 21, 1916
- Location: Ferry Field
  Ann Arbor, MI
- Referee: Horatio B. Hackett

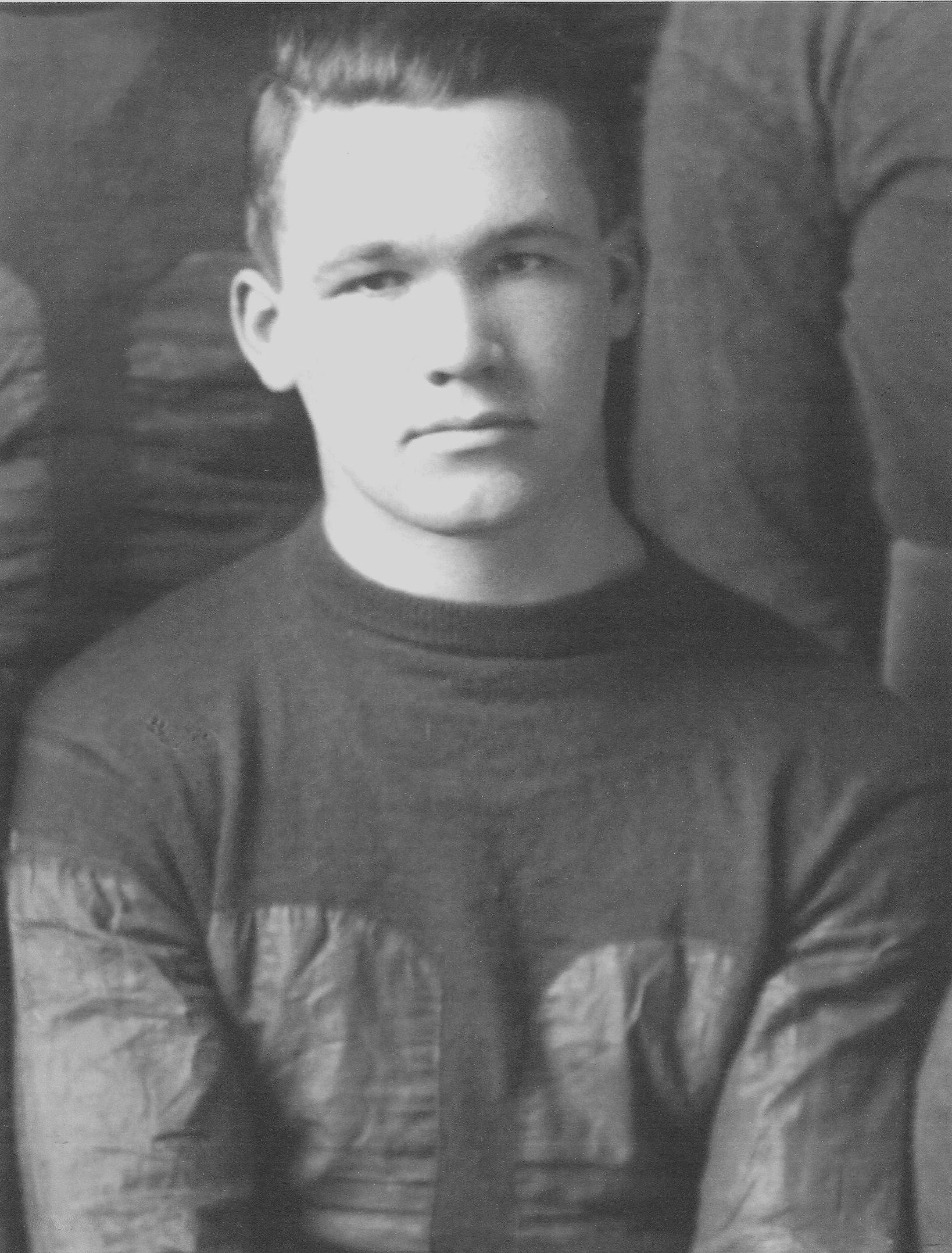
Coach Yost called the unplanned drop-kick field goal by Cliff Sparks (pictured) "the greatest individual play ever seen in my whole career".

Michigan played its annual game against Michigan Agricultural College at Ferry Field on October 21, 1916. It was the 11th game between the two schools dating back to 1898. Michigan had won seven of the prior ten games, but M.A.C. had defeated the Wolverines in 1915.

Michigan won the 1916 game by a score of 9–0. According to one account of the game, Michigan quarterback Cliff Sparks "crumpled the Aggie line almost every time he crashed into it and circled ends with ease, and was eel-like in running back punts." The play that drew the most attention was Sparks' drop-kick on a broken play that gave Michigan a 3–0 lead in the first quarter. The play called for Sparks to take the snap from center and hold the ball for a field goal attempt. The snap from center was high, forcing Sparks to react quickly. One press account described Sparks' actions as follows:

"And then seemingly with a single movement, Sparks jumped to his feet, grabbed the ball as it was about to clear his head, whirled to face the goal posts and drop-kicked the ball over the Aggie bar for a count of three points, which then and there cinched the game for the Wolverines. 'It was the greatest individual play ever seen in my whole career as coach or player,' was 'Hurry Up' Yost's comment after the game. And every person in the crowd who saw Sparks plan and execute that play in something less than two seconds chanted 'Amen!'"

Following the broken play in the first quarter, Sparks sought to confuse the Aggie defense by signaling for a kick formation several times, and on each occasion Sparks did something else "to the utter bewilderment of the Aggies."

After two scoreless quarters, M.A.C's Baker in the fourth quarter fumbled a punt at M.A.C.'s 22-yard line. After gains of 10 yards by Sparks and eight yards by Cedric "Pat" Smith, left halfback John Maulbetsch finished the drive with a two-yard run for the touchdown. Left end Maurice Dunne missed the kick for point after touchdown.

The game was played in 15-minute quarters. Michigan's starting lineup against M.A.C. was Maurice Dunne (left end), Tad Wieman (left tackle), Alan Boyd (left guard), Walter Niemann (center), Fred Rehor (right guard), Richard Weske (right tackle), Willard Peach (right end), Sparks (quarterback), Maulbetsch (left halfback), Philip Raymond (right halfback), and Smith (fullback). Substitutes appearing in the game for Michigan were Clifford Gracey (left guard), Joseph Hanish (right halfback), Bathrick (right halfback), and Sidney Eggert (left halfback).

=== Week 6: Syracuse ===
Week 6: Syracuse at Michigan

Team	1	2	3	4	Total
Syracuse	3	10	0	0	13
• Michigan	0	0	0	14	14

- Date: October 28, 1916
- Location: Ferry Field
  Ann Arbor, MI
- Referee: Holderness (Lehigh)

Michigan played its annual game against Syracuse University at Ferry Field on October 28, 1916. After leaving the Big Ten Conference, Michigan began playing an annual game against Syracuse. The 1916 game was the ninth game dating back to 1908. Michigan had compiled a 3-4-1 record in the prior eight games.

Michigan won the 1916 game by a score of 14–13. Syracuse jumped to a 13–0 lead, but Michigan came back with 14 points in the fourth quarter. After an injury sidelined quarterback Cliff Sparks earlier in the game, backup Harold Zeiger scored both touchdowns, and left halfback John Maulbetsch converted both kicks for points after touchdown. The first touchdown, with four minutes remaining in the game, resulted in a holding penalty moved the ball to the Syracuse six-yard line. After two unsuccessful line plays, the Wolverines lined up for a fake field goal, and Zeiger picked up the ball and ran around the right side for a touchdown. With two minutes remaining, Maurice Dunne intercepted a Syracuse pass at the 45-yard line. Cedric Smith threw to Dunne for 33 yards, and Syracuse was then penalized when Syracuse's coach Hollenbach stepped onto the field. The penalty advanced the ball to Syracuse's six-yard line. On second down, Zeiger ran four yards for a touchdown. With the game riding on the attempt at extra point, "Maulbetsch took his time, finally kicking the ball squarely between the uprights." The Michigan Alumnus wrote that Michigan's comeback, occurring in the final seven minutes of the game, "will go down in Michigan history."

The game was played in 15-minute quarters. Michigan's starting lineup against Syracuse was Maurice Dunne (left end), Tad Wieman (left tackle), Clifford Gracey (left guard), Walter Niemann (center), Fred Rehor (right guard), Richard Weske (right tackle), Willard Peach (right end), Cliff Sparks (quarterback), Maulbetsch (left halfback), Philip Raymond (right halfback), and Cedric "Pat" Smith (fullback). Substitutes appearing in the game for Michigan were Zeiger (quarterback), Alan Boyd (left guard), Albert Martens (right end), Hanish (right halfback), and John Orton Goodsell (right guard).

=== Week 7: Washington University ===
Week 7: Washington University at Michigan

Team	1	2	3	4	Total
Washington U.	0	7	0	0	7
• Michigan	6	20	13	27	66

- Date: November 4, 1916
- Location: Ferry Field
  Ann Arbor, MI
- Referee: Captain Haines (Yale)

On November 4, 1916, Michigan played the team from Washington University in St. Louis at Ferry Field. The game was the first and last meeting between the two programs. Washington University's head coach at the time was Bill Edmunds, a Michigan alumnus who had played for coach Yost's teams from 1908 to 1910.

The Wolverines defeated the Washington University Bears by a score of 66 to 7. John Maulbetsch led the attack for Michigan, scoring five touchdowns and kicking four extra points for 34 points. Quarterback Harold Zeiger scored two touchdowns, including a 45-yard run for touchdown, while Philip Raymond, N. J. Brazell and Joseph A. Hanish scored one touchdown each. Fred Rehor kicked two extra points. Raymond handled the punting for Michigan and had one punt that "with the wind behind it carried 70 yards on the fly."

Washington's touchdown came in the second quarter when Zeiger fumbled the ball while attempting a forward pass. Washington's left end Kling picked up the loose ball and returned it 40 yards for the score. On offense, Washington did not make a single first down by rushing, gaining less than 25 yards from scrimmage in the game.

The game was played in 15-minute quarters. Michigan's starting lineup was Maurice Dunne (left end), Tad Wieman (left tackle), Alan Boyd (left guard), Walter Niemann (center), Rehor (right guard), Richard Weske (right tackle), Willard Peach (right end), Harold Zeiger (quarterback), Maulbetsch (left halfback), Raymond (right halfback), and Cedric Smith (fullback). Substitutes appearing in the game for Michigan were R. Glenn Dunn, John Orton Goodsell, Albert Martens, Hanish, James Whalen, Clarence Skinner, Harry McCallum, Alvin Loucks, Sidney Eggert, Brazell, and Frank Willard.

=== Week 8: at Cornell ===
Week 8: Michigan at Cornell

Team	1	2	3	4	Total
Michigan	0	14	6	0	20
• Cornell	6	0	7	10	23

- Date: November 11, 1916
- Location: Schoellkopf Field
  Ithaca, NY

Michigan traveled to Ithaca, New York, for the team's only road game against Cornell. The game was the 14th meeting of the teams dating back to 1889. Michigan had won only three of the prior 13 meetings.

Michigan lost the 1916 game by a 23–20 score. Cornell quarterback Fritz Shiverick, who was later inducted into the College Football Hall of Fame, dropkicked two field goals in the first quarter to give the Big Red a 6 to 0 lead. In the second quarter, Michigan's left halfback John Maulbetsch ran for a touchdown and kicked the point after touchdown to put Michigan in the lead. Also in the second quarter, fullback Cedric "Pat" Smith ran for a touchdown with Maulbetsch again converting the extra point to put Michigan ahead, 14-6 at halftime. On a trick play in the third quarter, quarterback Harold Zeiger passed back to right end Willard Peach who then threw a 40-yard touchdown pass to left end Maurice Dunne. Maulbetsch missed the extra point, and Michigan led 20–6. Later in the third quarter, Cornell fullback Mueller ran for a touchdown, and Shiverick kicked the extra point to reduce the lead to 20–13. Early in the fourth quarter, Cornell tied the score at 20–20 on a second touchdown run by Mueller and another extra point by Shiverick. Shiverick then added his third drop-kicked field goal to give Cornell the victory.

The game was played in 15-minute quarters. Michigan's starting lineup against Cornell was Maurice Dunne (left end), Tad Wieman (left tackle), Clifford Gracey (left guard), Walter Niemann (center), Fred Rehor (right guard), Richard Weske (right tackle), Willard Peach (right end), Harold Zeiger (quarterback), Maulbetsch (left halfback), Raymond (right halfback), and Smith (fullback). Substitutes appearing in the game for Michigan included Alan Boyd (left guard).

=== Week 9: Penn ===
Week 7: Penn at Michigan

Team	1	2	3	4	Total
• Penn	7	3	0	0	10
Michigan	0	0	0	7	7

- Date: November 18, 1916
- Location: Ferry Field
  Ann Arbor, MI
- Referee: J. C. Holderness (Lehigh)

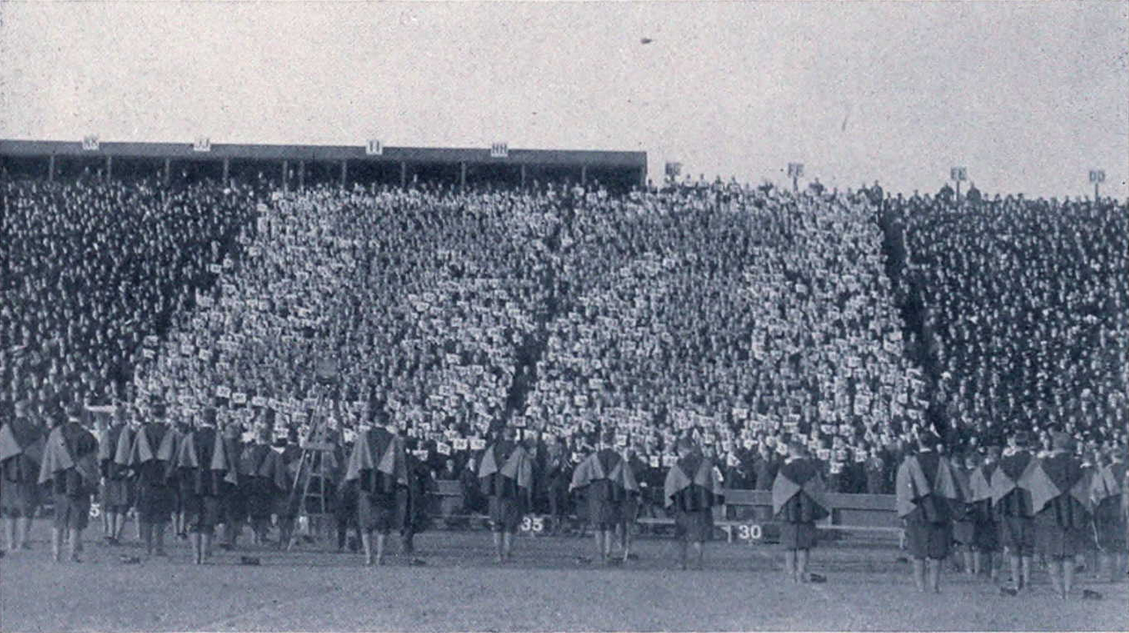
Singing The Yellow and the Blue between halves of the Penn Game, November 1916

On November 18, 1916, Michigan played its annual rivalry game against the Penn Quakers football team. The game was the 12th meeting between the teams dating back to 1899. After leaving the Big Ten Conference, Penn became Michigan's regular season-ending rivalry game. In the 11 prior meetings, Michigan had won only four times, with the two teams playing to a scoreless tie in 1915.

Penn won the 1916 game by a 10–7 score. Penn scored a touchdown by Howard Berry in the first quarter and a field goal by Derr in the second quarter and led 10 to 0 at halftime. In the fourth quarter, Michigan fullback Cedric Smith scored a touchdown for Michigan, and left halfback John Maulbetsch kicked the point after touchdown. The Michigan Alumnus wrote that Penn's star halfback Berry had been permitted to end his military career on the Mexican border in order to allow him to return to the Penn football team.

The game was played in 15-minute quarters. Michigan's starting lineup against Penn was Maurice Dunne (left end), Tad Wieman (left tackle), Alan Boyd (left guard), Walter Niemann (center), Rehor (right guard), Richard Weske (right tackle), Willard Peach (right end), Cliff Sparks (quarterback), Maulbetsch (left halfback), Philip Raymond (right halfback), and Smith (fullback). Substitutes appearing in the game for Michigan were Albert Martens (right end) and Harold Zeiger (quarterback).

== Players ==
=== Varsity letter winners ===
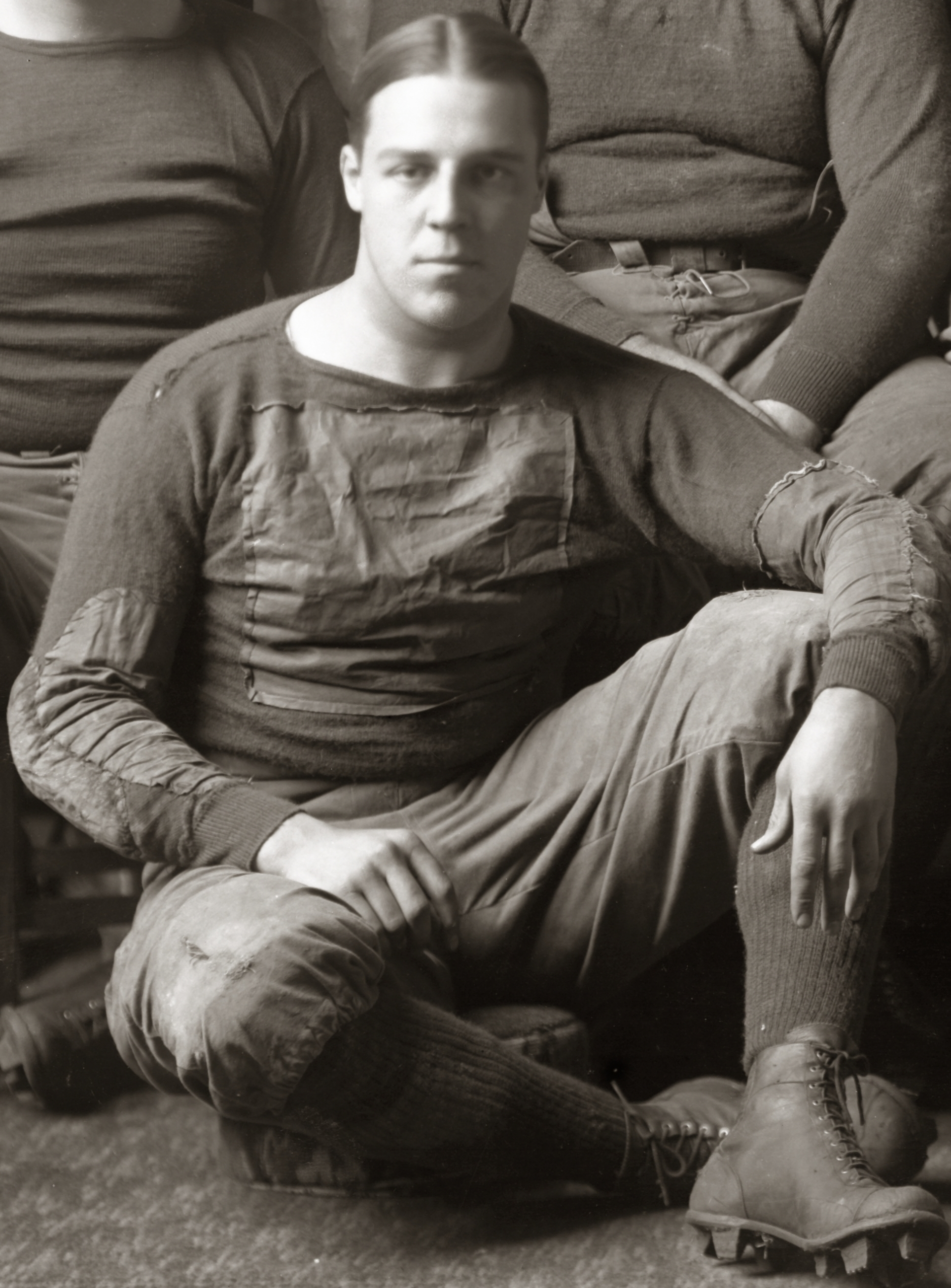
Fullback Cedric "Pat" Smith

- Alan W. Boyd - started 5 games at left guard
- Maurice F. Dunne - started 9 games at left end
- Clifford C. Gracey - started 2 games at left guard
- Albert C. Martens - right end
- John Maulbetsch - started 9 games at left halfback
- Walter Niemann - started 9 games at center
- Willard L. Peach - started 9 games at right end
- Philip T. Raymond, - started 5 games at right halfback, 1 game at fullback
- Fred Rehor - started 6 games at right guard, 2 games at left guard
- Cedric C. Smith - started 7 games at fullback
- Cliff Sparks - started 7 games at quarterback
- Richard F. "Dick" Weske - started 9 games at right tackle
- Tad Wieman - started 7 games at left tackle
- Harold M. Zeiger - started 2 games at quarterback, 1 game at right halfback

=== aMa letter winners ===
- Nicholas J. Brazell, Jr., - started 1 game at right halfback
- Roland G. Dunn - started 2 games at right guard
- Sidney V. Eggert - left halfback
- John O. Goodsell - started 1 game at right guard
- Joseph Anthony Hanish - started 1 game at fullback
- Alvin Loucks - right halfback
- Harry B. McCallum - left tackle
- James H. Sharpe, - started 1 game at right halfback
- Clarence O. Skinner - right guard
- Jim Whalen - started 2 game at left tackle
- Frank A. Willard - center

=== Others ===
- Donald U. Bathrick, - started 1 game at right halfback (reserve player)

=== Scoring leaders ===
Player	Touchdowns	Extra points	Field goals	Total Points
John Maulbetsch	11	20	1	89
Cliff Sparks	6	0	1	39
Harold Zeiger	5	0	0	30
Cedric "Pat" Smith	4	0	0	24
Philip Raymond	3	0	0	18
Nicholas J. Brazell	3	0	0	18
Joseph Hanish	2	0	0	12
Maurice Dunne	1	0	0	6
Walter Niemann	1	0	0	6
Fred Rehor	0	2	0	2
Frank Willard	0	2	0	2
unaccounted	1	0	0	6
Totals	37	24	2	252

=== Awards and honors ===
- Captain: John Maulbetsch
- All-Americans: Cliff Sparks (Monty, 1st team), John Maulbetsch (Fielding Yost, 1st team)

== Coaching staff ==
- Head coach: Fielding H. Yost
- Assistant coaches (varsity): Prentiss Douglass, Miller Pontius
- All-freshman coach: Ralph McGinnis
- Reserves coach: R. W. Watson and James Bland Catlett
- Trainer: Harry Tuthill
- Manager: John C. Robbins
