= 1916 Michigan Agricultural Aggies football team =

American college football season

1916 Michigan Agricultural Aggies football
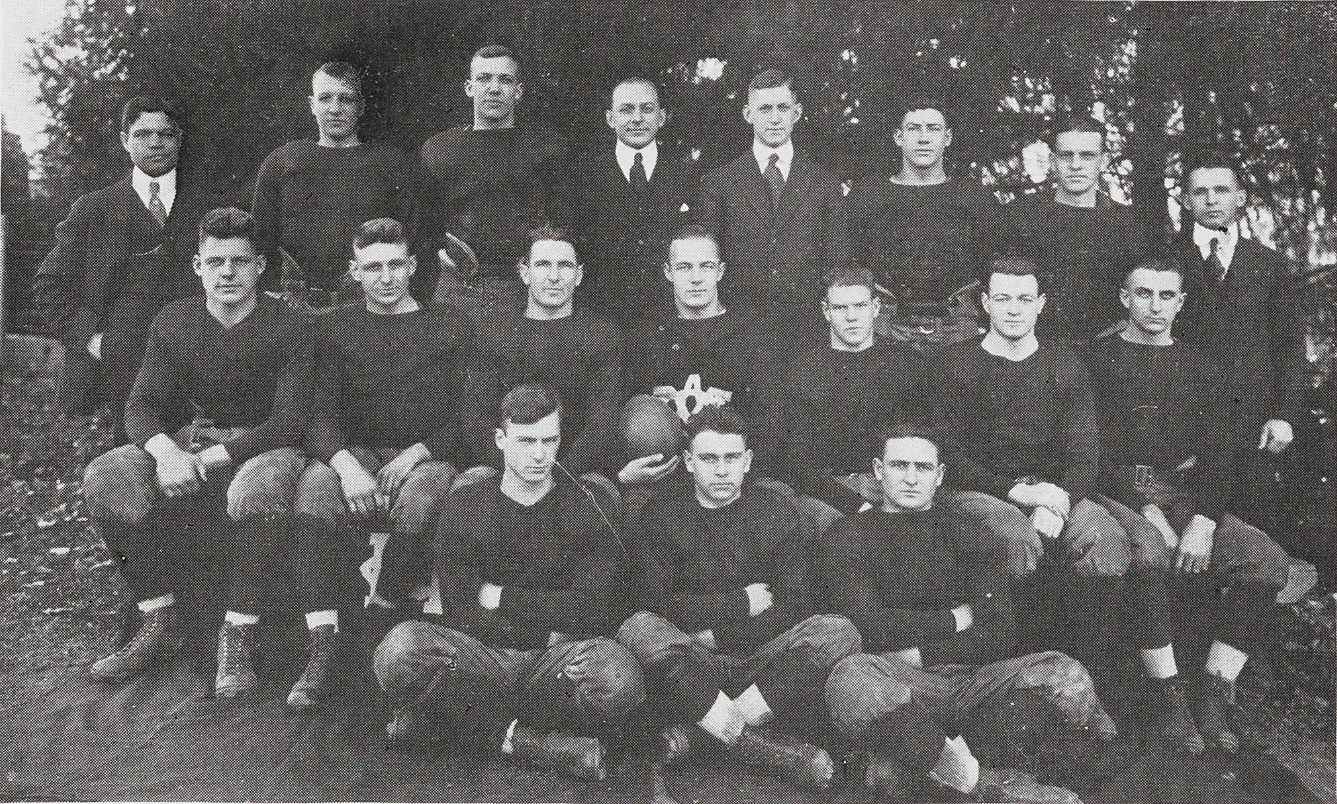
- Conference: Independent
- Record: 4–2–1
- Head coach: Dutch Sommer (1st season)
- Captain: Ralph B. Henning
- Home stadium: College Field

1916 Midwestern college football independents records
	Conf.			Overall
Team	W	L	T	W		L		T
St. Xavier		–		5	–	0	–	0
Notre Dame		–		8	–	1	–	0
Western State Normal		–		5	–	1	–	0
Northern Illinois State		–		6	–	1	–	1
Heidelberg		–		8	–	2	–	0
Michigan		–		7	–	2	–	0
Wabash		–		7	–	2	–	0
Michigan Agricultural		–		4	–	2	–	1
North Dakota Agricultural		–		3	–	2	–	1
Detroit		–		3	–	2	–	2
St. Mary's (OH)		–		4	–	3	–	0
Marquette		–		4	–	3	–	1
Saint Louis		–		4	–	4	–	0
Haskell		–		3	–	6	–	0
Michigan State Normal		–		1	–	2	–	1
South Dakota		–		1	–	5	–	2
Akron		–		2	–	7	–	0
Central Michigan		–		1	–	5	–	0
Iowa State Teachers		–		1	–	7	–	0
Lake Forest		–		1	–	7	–	0

The 1916 Michigan Agricultural Aggies football team represented Michigan Agricultural College (MAC) as an independent during the 1916 college football season. In their first year under head coach Dutch Sommer, the Aggies compiled a 4–2–1 record and outscored their opponents 126 to 26.

== Schedule ==
Date	Opponent	Site	Result	Attendance	Source
September 30	Olivet	College Field; East Lansing, MI	W 40–0		
October 7	Carroll (WI)	College Field; East Lansing, MI	W 20–0		
October 14	at Alma	Alma, MI	W 33–0		
October 21	at Michigan	Ferry Field; Ann Arbor, MI (rivalry)	L 0–9	22,000	
October 28	North Dakota Agricultural	College Field; East Lansing, MI	W 30–0		
November 4	at South Dakota	Vermillion, SD	T 3–3		
November 18	Notre Dame^{†}	College Field; East Lansing, MI (rivalry)	L 0–14		
^{†}Homecoming

== Game summaries ==
=== Michigan ===
Michigan Agricultural at Michigan

Team	1	2	3	4	Total
Michigan Agricultural	0	0	0	0	0
• Michigan	3	0	0	6	9

- Date: October 21, 1916
- Location: Ferry Field
  Ann Arbor, MI
- Referee: Hackett (Army)

The Aggies played their annual game against Michigan at Ferry Field on October 21, 1916. It was the 11th game between the two schools dating back to 1898. Michigan had won seven of the prior ten games, but M.A.C. had defeated the Wolverines in 1915. Michigan won the 1916 game by a score of 9 to 0. According to one account of the game, Michigan quarterback Cliff Sparks "crumpled the Aggie line almost every time he crashed into it and circled ends with ease, and was eel-like in running back punts." After two scoreless quarters, M.A.C's Baker in the fourth quarter fumbled a punt at M.A.C.'s 22-yard line. After gains of 10 yards by Sparks and eight yards by Cedric "Pat" Smith, left halfback John Maulbetsch finished the drive with a two-yard run for the touchdown. The game was played in 15-minute quarters.
