= 1916 St. Xavier Saints football team =

American college football season

1916 St. Xavier Saints football
- Conference: Independent
- Record: 5–0
- Head coach: None
- Home stadium: Avon Field

1916 Midwestern college football independents records
	Conf.			Overall
Team	W	L	T	W		L		T
St. Xavier		–		5	–	0	–	0
Notre Dame		–		8	–	1	–	0
Western State Normal		–		5	–	1	–	0
Northern Illinois State		–		6	–	1	–	1
Heidelberg		–		8	–	2	–	0
Michigan		–		7	–	2	–	0
Wabash		–		7	–	2	–	0
Michigan Agricultural		–		4	–	2	–	1
North Dakota Agricultural		–		3	–	2	–	1
Detroit		–		3	–	2	–	2
St. Mary's (OH)		–		4	–	3	–	0
Marquette		–		4	–	3	–	1
Saint Louis		–		4	–	4	–	0
Haskell		–		3	–	6	–	0
Michigan State Normal		–		1	–	2	–	1
South Dakota		–		1	–	5	–	2
Akron		–		2	–	7	–	0
Central Michigan		–		1	–	5	–	0
Iowa State Teachers		–		1	–	7	–	0
Lake Forest		–		1	–	7	–	0

The 1916 St. Xavier Saints football team was an American football team that represented St. Xavier College (now known as Xavier University) as an independent during the 1916 college football season. The team had no head coach, and the Saints compiled a 5–0 record.

== Schedule ==
Date	Opponent	Site	Result	Source
October 21	Wilmington (OH)	Avon Field; Cincinnati, OH	W 20–12	
October 27	Cincinnati freshmen	Avon Field; Cincinnati, OH	W 7–0	
November 4	Kentucky Military Institute	Avon Field; Cincinnati, OH	W 13–9	
November 11	Hanover	Avon Field; Cincinnati, OH	Canceled	
November 16	at Wilmington (OH)	College Stadium; Wilmington, OH	W 9–6	
December 2	Xavier Alumni	Avon Field; Cincinnati, OH	W 3–0	
