= 1916 Saint Louis Billikens football team =

American college football season

1916 Saint Louis Billikens football
- Conference: Independent
- Record: 4–4
- Head coach: Earl H. Painter (1st season)
- Captain: Flug
- Home stadium: Robison Field

1916 Midwestern college football independents records
	Conf.			Overall
Team	W	L	T	W		L		T
St. Xavier		–		5	–	0	–	0
Notre Dame		–		8	–	1	–	0
Western State Normal		–		5	–	1	–	0
Northern Illinois State		–		6	–	1	–	1
Heidelberg		–		8	–	2	–	0
Michigan		–		7	–	2	–	0
Wabash		–		7	–	2	–	0
Michigan Agricultural		–		4	–	2	–	1
North Dakota Agricultural		–		3	–	2	–	1
Detroit		–		3	–	2	–	2
St. Mary's (OH)		–		4	–	3	–	0
Marquette		–		4	–	3	–	1
Saint Louis		–		4	–	4	–	0
Haskell		–		3	–	6	–	0
Michigan State Normal		–		1	–	2	–	1
South Dakota		–		1	–	5	–	2
Akron		–		2	–	7	–	0
Central Michigan		–		1	–	5	–	0
Iowa State Teachers		–		1	–	7	–	0
Lake Forest		–		1	–	7	–	0

The 1916 Saint Louis Billikens football team was an American football team that represented Saint Louis University as an independent during the 1916 college football season. In their first and only season under head coach Earl H. Painter, the Billikens compiled a 4–4 record and outscored opponents by a total of 157 to 126. The team played its home games at Robison Field at St. Louis.

== Schedule ==
Date	Time	Opponent	Site	Result	Attendance	Source
October 10		Cape Girardeau Normal	Robison Field; St. Louis, MO	W 26–0		
October 14		Southern Illinois	Robison Field; St. Louis, MO	W 7–0		
October 24		McKendree	St. Louis, MO	W 88–0		
October 28	3:00 p.m.	William & Vashti	Robison Field; St. Louis, MO	W 36–7		
November 4		Creighton	Robison Field; St. Louis, MO	L 0–20		
November 11		at Marquette	Milwaukee, WI	L 0–66		
November 18		Warrensburg Teachers	Robison Field; St. Louis, MO	L 0–24		
November 30		at Washington University	Francis Field; St. Louis, MO	L 0–9	9,000	
