= 1916 Central Michigan Normalites football team =

American college football season

1916 Central Michigan Normalites football
- Conference: Independent
- Record: 1–5
- Head coach: Blake Miller (1st season)

1916 Midwestern college football independents records
	Conf.			Overall
Team	W	L	T	W		L		T
St. Xavier		–		5	–	0	–	0
Notre Dame		–		8	–	1	–	0
Western State Normal		–		5	–	1	–	0
Northern Illinois State		–		6	–	1	–	1
Heidelberg		–		8	–	2	–	0
Michigan		–		7	–	2	–	0
Wabash		–		7	–	2	–	0
Michigan Agricultural		–		4	–	2	–	1
North Dakota Agricultural		–		3	–	2	–	1
Detroit		–		3	–	2	–	2
St. Mary's (OH)		–		4	–	3	–	0
Marquette		–		4	–	3	–	1
Saint Louis		–		4	–	4	–	0
Haskell		–		3	–	6	–	0
Michigan State Normal		–		1	–	2	–	1
South Dakota		–		1	–	5	–	2
Akron		–		2	–	7	–	0
Central Michigan		–		1	–	5	–	0
Iowa State Teachers		–		1	–	7	–	0
Lake Forest		–		1	–	7	–	0

The 1916 Central Michigan Normalites football team represented Central Michigan Normal School, later renamed Central Michigan University, as an independent during the 1916 college football season. In their first and only season under head coach Blake Miller, the Central Michigan football team compiled a 1–5 record and were outscored by their opponents by a combined total of 139 to 39. The team played only three intercollegiate games, losing twice to Alma College (0–39, 0–44) and once to the Michigan Agricultural frosh team (0–14). The team's only victory was by a 39–0 score against West Branch High School.

== Schedule ==
Date	Opponent	Site	Result	Source
October 6	West Branch High School	Mount Pleasant, MI	W 39–0	
October 14	Bay City High School		L 0–12	
October 20	at Alma	Alma, MI	L 0–41	
October 28	Saginaw East High School		L 0–32	
November 8	Alma	Mount Pleasant, MI	L 0–40	
November 17	Michigan Agricultural freshmen		L 0–14	
