= 1916 North Dakota Agricultural Aggies football team =

American college football season

1916 North Dakota Agricultural Aggies football
- Conference: Independent
- Record: 3–2–1
- Head coach: Paul J. Davis (2nd season)
- Captain: Steve "Dick" Bjornson
- Home stadium: Dacotah Field

1916 Midwestern college football independents records
| | Conf. | | | Overall |
| Team | W | L | T | W | | L | | T |
|---|---|---|---|---|---|---|---|---|
| St. Xavier | | – | | 5 | – | 0 | – | 0 |
| Notre Dame | | – | | 8 | – | 1 | – | 0 |
| Western State Normal | | – | | 5 | – | 1 | – | 0 |
| Northern Illinois State | | – | | 6 | – | 1 | – | 1 |
| Heidelberg | | – | | 8 | – | 2 | – | 0 |
| Michigan | | – | | 7 | – | 2 | – | 0 |
| Wabash | | – | | 7 | – | 2 | – | 0 |
| Michigan Agricultural | | – | | 4 | – | 2 | – | 1 |
| North Dakota Agricultural | | – | | 3 | – | 2 | – | 1 |
| Detroit | | – | | 3 | – | 2 | – | 2 |
| St. Mary's (OH) | | – | | 4 | – | 3 | – | 0 |
| Marquette | | – | | 4 | – | 3 | – | 1 |
| Saint Louis | | – | | 4 | – | 4 | – | 0 |
| Haskell | | – | | 3 | – | 6 | – | 0 |
| Michigan State Normal | | – | | 1 | – | 2 | – | 1 |
| South Dakota | | – | | 1 | – | 5 | – | 2 |
| Akron | | – | | 2 | – | 7 | – | 0 |
| Central Michigan | | – | | 1 | – | 5 | – | 0 |
| Iowa State Teachers | | – | | 1 | – | 7 | – | 0 |
| Lake Forest | | – | | 1 | – | 7 | – | 0 |

The 1916 North Dakota Agricultural Aggies football team was an American football team that represented North Dakota Agricultural College (now known as North Dakota State University) as an independent during the 1916 college football season. In their second year under head coach Paul J. Davis, the team compiled a 3–2–1 record.

== Schedule ==
| Date | Opponent | Site | Result | Source |
|---|---|---|---|---|
| October 7 | Wahpeton | Dacotah Field; Fargo, ND | W 54–0 | |
| October 14 | St. Thomas (MN) | Dacotah Field; Fargo, ND | W 10–7 | |
| October 21 | at Hamline | St. Paul, MN | T 14–14 | |
| October 28 | at Michigan Agricultural | College Field; East Lansing, MI | L 0–30 | |
| November 4 | at North Dakota | Dakota Field; Grand Forks, ND (rivalry) | L 0–10 | |
| November 16 | Fargo | Dacotah Field; Fargo, ND | W 13–7 | |
