= 1916 Detroit Tigers football team =

American college football season

1916 Detroit Tigers football
- Conference: Independent
- Record: 3–2–2
- Head coach: Harry Costello (2nd season)
- Home stadium: D.U.S. Field

1916 Midwestern college football independents records
	Conf.			Overall
Team	W	L	T	W		L		T
St. Xavier		–		5	–	0	–	0
Notre Dame		–		8	–	1	–	0
Western State Normal		–		5	–	1	–	0
Northern Illinois State		–		6	–	1	–	1
Heidelberg		–		8	–	2	–	0
Michigan		–		7	–	2	–	0
Wabash		–		7	–	2	–	0
Michigan Agricultural		–		4	–	2	–	1
North Dakota Agricultural		–		3	–	2	–	1
Detroit		–		3	–	2	–	2
St. Mary's (OH)		–		4	–	3	–	0
Marquette		–		4	–	3	–	1
Saint Louis		–		4	–	4	–	0
Haskell		–		3	–	6	–	0
Michigan State Normal		–		1	–	2	–	1
South Dakota		–		1	–	5	–	2
Akron		–		2	–	7	–	0
Central Michigan		–		1	–	5	–	0
Iowa State Teachers		–		1	–	7	–	0
Lake Forest		–		1	–	7	–	0

The 1916 Detroit Tigers football team was an American football team that represented the University of Detroit in the 1916 college football season. In its second season under head coach Harry Costello, the team compiled a 3–2–2 record and outscored its opponents by a combined total of 98 to 38.

== Schedule ==
Date	Opponent	Site	Result	Source
October 7	Defiance	D.U.S. Field; Detroit, MI	W 18–0	
October 21	Hillsdale	D.U.S. Field; Detroit, MI	T 7–7	
October 28	Michigan State Normal	D.U.S. Field; Detroit, MI	L 6–12	
	Battle Creek Training School		W 7–6	
November 11	Findlay	D.U.S. Field; Detroit, MI	W 47–0	
November 18	Heidelberg	D.U.S. Field; Detroit, MI	L 12–13	
November 25	at Buffalo	International Park; Buffalo, NY	T 0–0	
