= 1916 Western State Normal Hilltoppers football team =

American college football season

1916 Western State Normal Hilltoppers football
- Conference: Independent
- Record: 5–1
- Head coach: William H. Spaulding (10th season)
- Captain: Scott Burke
- Home stadium: Normal field

1916 Midwestern college football independents records
	Conf.			Overall
Team	W	L	T	W		L		T
St. Xavier		–		5	–	0	–	0
Notre Dame		–		8	–	1	–	0
Western State Normal		–		5	–	1	–	0
Northern Illinois State		–		6	–	1	–	1
Heidelberg		–		8	–	2	–	0
Michigan		–		7	–	2	–	0
Wabash		–		7	–	2	–	0
Michigan Agricultural		–		4	–	2	–	1
North Dakota Agricultural		–		3	–	2	–	1
Detroit		–		3	–	2	–	2
St. Mary's (OH)		–		4	–	3	–	0
Marquette		–		4	–	3	–	1
Saint Louis		–		4	–	4	–	0
Haskell		–		3	–	6	–	0
Michigan State Normal		–		1	–	2	–	1
South Dakota		–		1	–	5	–	2
Akron		–		2	–	7	–	0
Central Michigan		–		1	–	5	–	0
Iowa State Teachers		–		1	–	7	–	0
Lake Forest		–		1	–	7	–	0

The 1916 Western State Normal Hilltoppers football team represented Western State Normal School (later renamed Western Michigan University) as an independent during the 1916 college football season. In their 10th season under head coach William H. Spaulding, the Hilltoppers compiled a 5–1 record and outscored their opponents, 391 to 19. Quarterback Scott Burke was the 1916 team captain.

The 1916 team set multiple team scoring records.

- Season scoring. The team set a season scoring with 391 points, a record that was not surpassed by a Western Michigan football team until the 2011 team scored 459 points.
- Point differential. The differential of 372 between points scored and points allowed remains the largest in Western Michigan history.
- Single game. The team also set a single-game scoring record with 91 points on September 30 against the Grand Rapids Veterinary College. It then broke that record on October 28 with 94 points against the Winono Agricultural, also known as the Indiana Aggies.

== Schedule ==
Date	Opponent	Site	Result	Source
September 30	Grand Rapids Veterinary College	Normal field; Kalamazoo, MI	W 93–0	
October 6	Albion	Normal field; Kalamazoo, MI	W 37–0	
October 28	Winona Agricultural	Normal field; Kalamazoo, MI	W 94–6	
November 4	Michigan Agricultural freshmen	Normal field; Kalamazoo, MI	W 77–3	
November 11	Notre Dame freshmen	Normal field; Kalamazoo, MI	L 6–10	
November 18	Ohio Northern	Normal field; Kalamazoo, MI	W 84–0	
