= 1916 Michigan State Normal Normalites football team =

American college football season

1916 Michigan State Normal Normalites football
- Conference: Independent
- Record: 1–2–1
- Head coach: Elmer Mitchell (2nd season)
- Captain: Alexander J. Longnecker

1916 Midwestern college football independents records
	Conf.			Overall
Team	W	L	T	W		L		T
St. Xavier		–		5	–	0	–	0
Notre Dame		–		8	–	1	–	0
Western State Normal		–		5	–	1	–	0
Northern Illinois State		–		6	–	1	–	1
Heidelberg		–		8	–	2	–	0
Michigan		–		7	–	2	–	0
Wabash		–		7	–	2	–	0
Michigan Agricultural		–		4	–	2	–	1
North Dakota Agricultural		–		3	–	2	–	1
Detroit		–		3	–	2	–	2
St. Mary's (OH)		–		4	–	3	–	0
Marquette		–		4	–	3	–	1
Saint Louis		–		4	–	4	–	0
Haskell		–		3	–	6	–	0
Michigan State Normal		–		1	–	2	–	1
South Dakota		–		1	–	5	–	2
Akron		–		2	–	7	–	0
Central Michigan		–		1	–	5	–	0
Iowa State Teachers		–		1	–	7	–	0
Lake Forest		–		1	–	7	–	0

The 1916 Michigan State Normal Normalites football team was an American football team that represented Michigan State Normal College (later renamed Eastern Michigan University) as an independent during the 1916 college football season. In their second and final season under head coach Elmer Mitchell, the Normalites compiled a 1–2–1 record and were outscored by a total of 33 to 18. Alexander J. Longnecker was the team captain.

Mitchell was both football coach and athletic director at Michigan State Normal College. In March 1917, he was hired as the University of Michigan´s head basketball coach and assistant coach to the football and baseball teams.

== Schedule ==
Date	Opponent	Site	Result	Source
October 7	Alma	Ypsilanti, MI	L 0–6	
October 14	at Michigan freshmen		T 0–0	
October 21	Kalamazoo	Ypsilanti, MI	L 6–21	
October 26	at Detroit	D.U.S. Field; Detroit, MI	W 12–6	
