= 1916 Haskell Indians football team =

American college football season

1916 Haskell Indians football
- Conference: Independent
- Record: 3–6
- Head coach: A. M. Venne (1st season)

1916 Midwestern college football independents records
	Conf.			Overall
Team	W	L	T	W		L		T
St. Xavier		–		5	–	0	–	0
Notre Dame		–		8	–	1	–	0
Western State Normal		–		5	–	1	–	0
Northern Illinois State		–		6	–	1	–	1
Heidelberg		–		8	–	2	–	0
Michigan		–		7	–	2	–	0
Wabash		–		7	–	2	–	0
Michigan Agricultural		–		4	–	2	–	1
North Dakota Agricultural		–		3	–	2	–	1
Detroit		–		3	–	2	–	2
St. Mary's (OH)		–		4	–	3	–	0
Marquette		–		4	–	3	–	1
Saint Louis		–		4	–	4	–	0
Haskell		–		3	–	6	–	0
Michigan State Normal		–		1	–	2	–	1
South Dakota		–		1	–	5	–	2
Akron		–		2	–	7	–	0
Central Michigan		–		1	–	5	–	0
Iowa State Teachers		–		1	–	7	–	0
Lake Forest		–		1	–	7	–	0

The 1916 Haskell Indians football team was an American football team that represented the Haskell Indian Institute (now known as Haskell Indian Nations University) as an independent during the 1916 college football season. In its first and only season under head coach A. M. Venne, Haskell compiled a 3–6 record and was outscored by a total of 130 to 63.

== Schedule ==
Date	Time	Opponent	Site	Result	Attendance	Source
September 29	3:00 p.m.	Bethany (KS)	Haskell Field; Lawrence, KS	W 20–3		
October 6	3:00 p.m.	Hays Normal	Haskell Field; Lawrence, KS	W 27–7		
October 14		at Notre Dame	Cartier Field; Notre Dame, IN	L 0–25		
October 21		at Wisconsin	Randall Field; Madison, WI	L 0–13		
October 28		vs. Texas A&M	Fair Park Athletic Field; Dallas, TX	L 6–13		
November 3	3:30 p.m.	at Friends	Island Park; Wichita, KS	W 10–3	2,000	
November 11	3:00 p.m.	Kansas State Normal	Haskell Field; Lawrence, KS	L 0–14		
November 18		at Kendall	Association Park; Tulsa, OK	L 0–46		
November 24		at Warrensburg Normal	Warrensburg, MO	L 0–6		
