= 1916 Northern Illinois State Normal football team =

American college football season

1916 Northern Illinois State Normal football
- Conference: Independent
- Record: 6–1–1
- Head coach: William Wirtz (7th season)
- Captain: Paul Harrison
- Home stadium: Glidden Field

1916 Midwestern college football independents records
	Conf.			Overall
Team	W	L	T	W		L		T
St. Xavier		–		5	–	0	–	0
Notre Dame		–		8	–	1	–	0
Western State Normal		–		5	–	1	–	0
Northern Illinois State		–		6	–	1	–	1
Heidelberg		–		8	–	2	–	0
Michigan		–		7	–	2	–	0
Wabash		–		7	–	2	–	0
Michigan Agricultural		–		4	–	2	–	1
North Dakota Agricultural		–		3	–	2	–	1
Detroit		–		3	–	2	–	2
St. Mary's (OH)		–		4	–	3	–	0
Marquette		–		4	–	3	–	1
Saint Louis		–		4	–	4	–	0
Haskell		–		3	–	6	–	0
Michigan State Normal		–		1	–	2	–	1
South Dakota		–		1	–	5	–	2
Akron		–		2	–	7	–	0
Central Michigan		–		1	–	5	–	0
Iowa State Teachers		–		1	–	7	–	0
Lake Forest		–		1	–	7	–	0

The 1916 Northern Illinois State Normal football team represented Northern Illinois State Normal College as an independent in the 1916 college football season. They were led by seventh-year head coach William Wirtz and played their home games at Glidden Field, located on the east end of campus. The team finished the season with a 6–1–1 record. Paul Harrison was the team's captain.

== Schedule ==
Date	Opponent	Site	Result	Source
September 30	at East Aurora High School	Aurora, IL	L 3–13	
October 7	at Wheaton (IL)	Wheaton, IL	W 13–0	
October 14	North-Western College	Glidden Field; DeKalb, IL	W 16–0	
October 21	at Lewis	Chicago, IL	W 7–0	
October 28	at Elgin Academy	Elgin, IL	T 0–0	
November 4	Chicago Technical	Glidden Field; DeKalb, IL	W 52–0	
November 11	at North-Western College	Naperville, IL	W 7–6	
November 18	Wheaton (IL)	Glidden Field; DeKalb, IL	W 7–0	
