= 1916 Notre Dame Fighting Irish football team =

American college football season

1916 Notre Dame Fighting Irish football
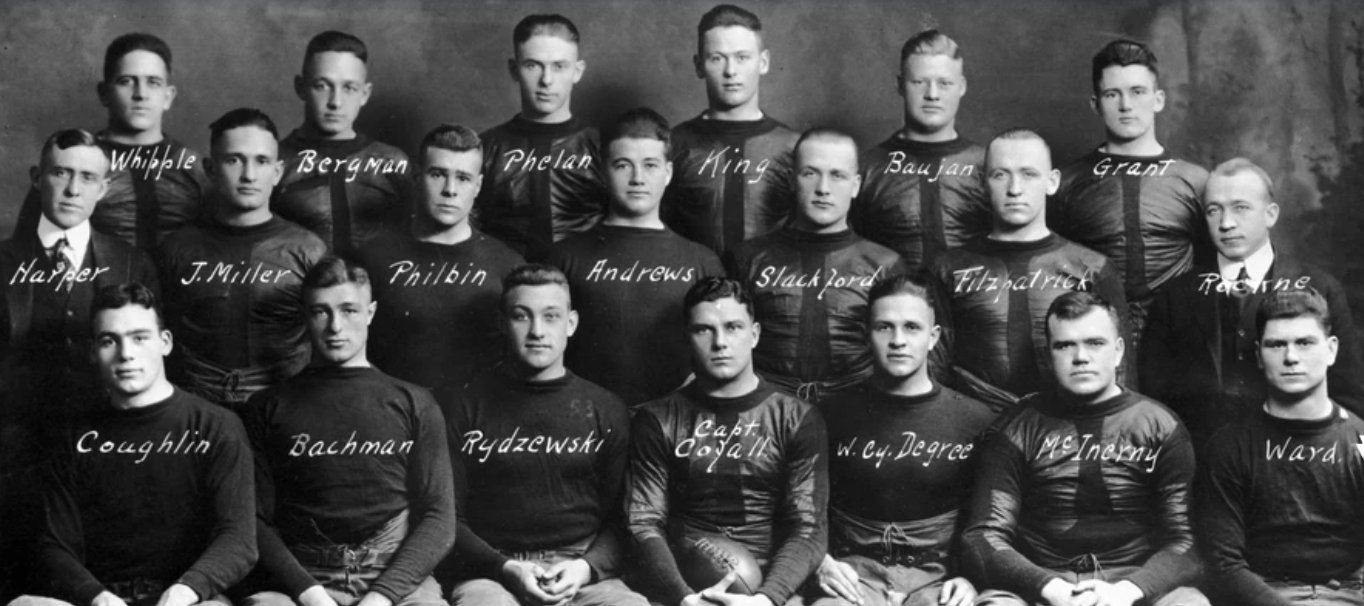
- Conference: Independent
- Record: 8–1
- Head coach: Jesse Harper (4th season)
- Offensive scheme: Single-wing
- Captain: Stan Cofall
- Home stadium: Cartier Field

1916 Midwestern college football independents records
	Conf.			Overall
Team	W	L	T	W		L		T
St. Xavier		–		5	–	0	–	0
Notre Dame		–		8	–	1	–	0
Western State Normal		–		5	–	1	–	0
Northern Illinois State		–		6	–	1	–	1
Heidelberg		–		8	–	2	–	0
Michigan		–		7	–	2	–	0
Wabash		–		7	–	2	–	0
Michigan Agricultural		–		4	–	2	–	1
North Dakota Agricultural		–		3	–	2	–	1
Detroit		–		3	–	2	–	2
St. Mary's (OH)		–		4	–	3	–	0
Marquette		–		4	–	3	–	1
Saint Louis		–		4	–	4	–	0
Haskell		–		3	–	6	–	0
Michigan State Normal		–		1	–	2	–	1
South Dakota		–		1	–	5	–	2
Akron		–		2	–	7	–	0
Central Michigan		–		1	–	5	–	0
Iowa State Teachers		–		1	–	7	–	0
Lake Forest		–		1	–	7	–	0

The 1916 Notre Dame Fighting Irish football team was an American football team that represented the University of Notre Dame as an independent during the 1916 college football season. In their fourth year under head coach Jesse Harper, the Irish compiled an 8–1 record, shut out eight of nine opponents, and outscored all opponents by a total of 292 to 30. The sole loss and the only points allowed were in a 30–10 road loss to Army. The team went on to shut out both Michigan Agricultural (now Michigan State) and Nebraska.

Knute Rockne was assistant coach for the third year. Key players included team captain and halfback Stan Cofall and guard Charlie Bachman, both of whom won first-team honors on the 1916 All-Western college football team.

The team played its home games at Cartier Field in Notre Dame, Indiana.

== Schedule ==
Date	Opponent	Site	Result	Source
September 30	Case	Cartier Field; Notre Dame, IN	W 48–0	
October 7	at Western Reserve	Case Field; Cleveland, OH	W 48–0	
October 14	Haskell	Cartier Field; Notre Dame, IN	W 25–0	
October 28	Wabash	Cartier Field; Notre Dame, IN	W 60–0	
November 4	at Army	The Plain; West Point, NY (rivalry)	L 10–30	
November 11	vs. South Dakota	Sioux Falls, SD	W 21–0	
November 18	at Michigan Agricultural	Old College Field; East Lansing, MI (rivalry)	W 14–0	
November 25	Alma	Cartier Field; Notre Dame, IN	W 46–0	
November 30	at Nebraska	Nebraska Field; Lincoln, NE (rivalry)	W 20–0	

== Personnel ==
=== Players ===
- "Bodie" Andrews, tackle
- Charlie Bachman, guard
- Harry Baujan, end
- Dutch Bergman, halfback
- Stan Cofall, captain and halfback
- Frank Coughlin, tackle
- Cy DeGree, guard
- Steve Fitzpatrick, halfback/fullback
- Chet Grant, quarterback
- Tom King, end
- Slip Madigan, center
- Arnold McInerny, tackle
- Jack Meagher, end
- John Miller, fullback
- James Phelan, quarterback
- Dave Philbin
- Frank Rydzewski, center
- Fritz Slackford, fullback
- Gilbert Ward
- Ray Whipple, end

=== Coaching staff ===
- Head coach - Jesse Harper
- Assistant coach - Knute Rockne
