= 1916 South Dakota Coyotes football team =

American college football season

1916 South Dakota Coyotes football
- Conference: Independent
- Record: 1–5–2
- Head coach: Blaine McKusick (1st season)

1916 Midwestern college football independents records
	Conf.			Overall
Team	W	L	T	W		L		T
St. Xavier		–		5	–	0	–	0
Notre Dame		–		8	–	1	–	0
Western State Normal		–		5	–	1	–	0
Northern Illinois State		–		6	–	1	–	1
Heidelberg		–		8	–	2	–	0
Michigan		–		7	–	2	–	0
Wabash		–		7	–	2	–	0
Michigan Agricultural		–		4	–	2	–	1
North Dakota Agricultural		–		3	–	2	–	1
Detroit		–		3	–	2	–	2
St. Mary's (OH)		–		4	–	3	–	0
Marquette		–		4	–	3	–	1
Saint Louis		–		4	–	4	–	0
Haskell		–		3	–	6	–	0
Michigan State Normal		–		1	–	2	–	1
South Dakota		–		1	–	5	–	2
Akron		–		2	–	7	–	0
Central Michigan		–		1	–	5	–	0
Iowa State Teachers		–		1	–	7	–	0
Lake Forest		–		1	–	7	–	0

The 1916 South Dakota Coyotes football team represented the University of South Dakota during the 1916 college football season.

== Schedule ==
Date	Opponent	Site	Result	Source
October 7	vs. Montana	Aberdeen, SD	L 0–11	
October 14	Dakota Wesleyan	Vermillion, SD	W 60–0	
October 21	at Minnesota	Northrop Field; Minneapolis, MN	L 0–81	
October 28	at North Dakota	Grand Forks, ND (rivalry)	L 0–20	
November 4	at Michigan Agricultural	College Field; East Lansing, MI	T 3–3	
November 11	vs. Notre Dame	Sioux Falls, SD	L 0-21	
November 18	at Morningside	Sioux City, IA	T 0–0	
November 30	at Creighton	Omaha, NE	L 13–20	
