= Earl Painter =

Earl Painter may refer to:

- Earl H. Painter (1888–1969), American college football player and coach at Saint Louis University, lawyer for Southwestern Bell Telephone Company
- Erle V. Painter (1881–1968), American chiropractor and athletic trainer for the Boston Braves (1929) and New York Yankees (1930–1942)
