= Walter Niemann =

Walter Niemann may refer to:

- Walter Niemann (composer) (1876–1953), German composer, arranger, music critic, and musicologist.
- Walter Niemann (American football) (born 1894), American football player
