= Blaine McKusick =

American football and basketball coach (1888–1960)

Biographical details
- Born: February 23, 1888; Calais, Maine, U.S.
- Died: August 8, 1960 (aged 72); Minneapolis, Minnesota, U.S.
- Education: South Dakota (JD, 1913)

Playing career

Football
- 1907–1908: Bowdoin

Coaching career (HC unless noted)

Football
- 1915: South Dakota (assistant)
- 1916–1917: South Dakota
- 1919: Missouri Military Academy (MO)

Basketball
- 1915–1916: South Dakota (assistant)
- 1916–1917: South Dakota

Head coaching record
- Overall: 3–8–2 (college football); 8–1 (college basketball)

James Gilespie Blaine McKusick (February 23, 1888 – August 8, 1960) was an American football and basketball coach. He served as both the head football coach and head basketball coach at the University of South Dakota from 1916 to 1917.

McKusick attended Bowdoin College in Maine before becoming a student at the University of South Dakota School of Law in 1911. He also served as the head football coach at Missouri Military Academy in Mexico, Missouri in 1920.

== Head coaching record ==
=== Football ===
Year	Team	Overall	Conference	Standing	Bowl/playoffs
South Dakota Coyotes (Independent) (1916–1917)
1916	South Dakota	1–5–2			
1917	South Dakota	2–3			
South Dakota:		3–8–2			
Total:		3–8–2			
