= 1916 Ohio Green and White football team =

American college football season

1916 Ohio Green and White football
- Conference: Ohio Athletic Conference
- Record: 5–2–1 (4–1–1 OAC)
- Head coach: M. B. Banks (4th season)

1916 Ohio Athletic Conference football standings
	Conf.					Overall
Team	W		L		T	W		L		T
Miami (OH) $	6	–	0	–	1	7	–	0	–	1
Mount Union	6	–	1	–	0	8	–	2	–	0
Denison	5	–	0	–	2	5	–	1	–	2
Ohio	4	–	1	–	1	5	–	2	–	1
Wooster	5	–	2	–	0	6	–	2	–	0
Case	4	–	3	–	0	5	–	5	–	0
Ohio Wesleyan	2	–	2	–	2	2	–	3	–	2
Western Reserve	3	–	4	–	0	3	–	7	–	0
Akron	2	–	4	–	0	2	–	7	–	0
Ohio Northern	2	–	5	–	0	3	–	7	–	0
Kenyon	2	–	5	–	0	2	–	7	–	0
Wittenberg	0	–	5	–	1	2	–	5	–	2
Cincinnati	0	–	6	–	1	0	–	8	–	2
Baldwin–Wallace	0	–	1	–	0	0	–	2	–	0
Oberlin	0	–	5	–	0	0	–	7	–	0
Ohio State *	3	–	0	–	0	7	–	0	–	0
$ – Conference champion; * – did not complete for championship

The 1916 Ohio Green and White football team represented Ohio University as a member of the Ohio Athletic Conference (OAC) during the 1916 college football season. Led by fourth-year head coach M. B. Banks, the Green and White compiled an overall record of 5–2–1 with a mark of 4–1–1 in conference play, placing fourth in the OAC.

== Schedule ==
Date	Opponent	Site	Result	Source
September 30	at Ohio Wesleyan	Delaware, OH	T 0–0	
October 7	at Syracuse*	Archbold Stadium; Syracuse, NY	L 0–73	
October 14	Otterbein*	Athens, OH	W 13–7	
October 21	at Oberlin	Oberlin, OH	W 13–7	
October 28	Kenyon	Athens, OH	W 6–0	
November 3	Wittenberg	Athens, OH	W 89–3	
November 11	at Cincinnati	Cincinnati, OH	W 33–10	
November 17	at Wooster	Wooster, OH	L 0–9	
*Non-conference game
