= 1916 Western Reserve football team =

American college football season

1916 Western Reserve football
- Conference: Ohio Athletic Conference
- Record: 3–7 (3–4 OAC)
- Head coach: Walter D. Powell (3rd season)
- Captain: Denaple (quarterback)

1916 Ohio Athletic Conference football standings
	Conf.					Overall
Team	W		L		T	W		L		T
Miami (OH) $	6	–	0	–	1	7	–	0	–	1
Mount Union	6	–	1	–	0	8	–	2	–	0
Denison	5	–	0	–	2	5	–	1	–	2
Ohio	4	–	1	–	1	5	–	2	–	1
Wooster	5	–	2	–	0	6	–	2	–	0
Case	4	–	3	–	0	5	–	5	–	0
Ohio Wesleyan	2	–	2	–	2	2	–	3	–	2
Western Reserve	3	–	4	–	0	3	–	7	–	0
Akron	2	–	4	–	0	2	–	7	–	0
Ohio Northern	2	–	5	–	0	3	–	7	–	0
Kenyon	2	–	5	–	0	2	–	7	–	0
Wittenberg	0	–	5	–	1	2	–	5	–	2
Cincinnati	0	–	6	–	1	0	–	8	–	2
Baldwin–Wallace	0	–	1	–	0	0	–	2	–	0
Oberlin	0	–	5	–	0	0	–	7	–	0
Ohio State *	3	–	0	–	0	7	–	0	–	0
$ – Conference champion; * – did not complete for championship

The 1916 Western Reserve football team represented Western Reserve University, now the Case Western Reserve University, during the 1916 college football season.

== Schedule ==
Date	Opponent	Site	Result	Source
September 30	Hiram*	Cleveland, OH	L 0–7	
October 7	at Notre Dame*	Case Field; Cleveland, OH	L 0–48	
October 14	at Akron	Buchtel Field; Akron, OH	W 14–3	
October 21	Denison	Cleveland, OH	L 6–27	
October 28	at Heidelberg	Tiffin, OH	L 0–21	
November 4	Oberlin	Cleveland, OH	W 53–8	
November 11	Mount Union	Cleveland, OH	L 0–7	
November 18	at Miami (OH)	Miami Field; Oxford, OH	L 6–35	
November 25	at Kenyon	Gambier, OH	L 0–10	
November 30	Case	Cleveland, OH	W 27–6	
*Non-conference game
