= 1916 Case football team =

American college football season

1916 Case football
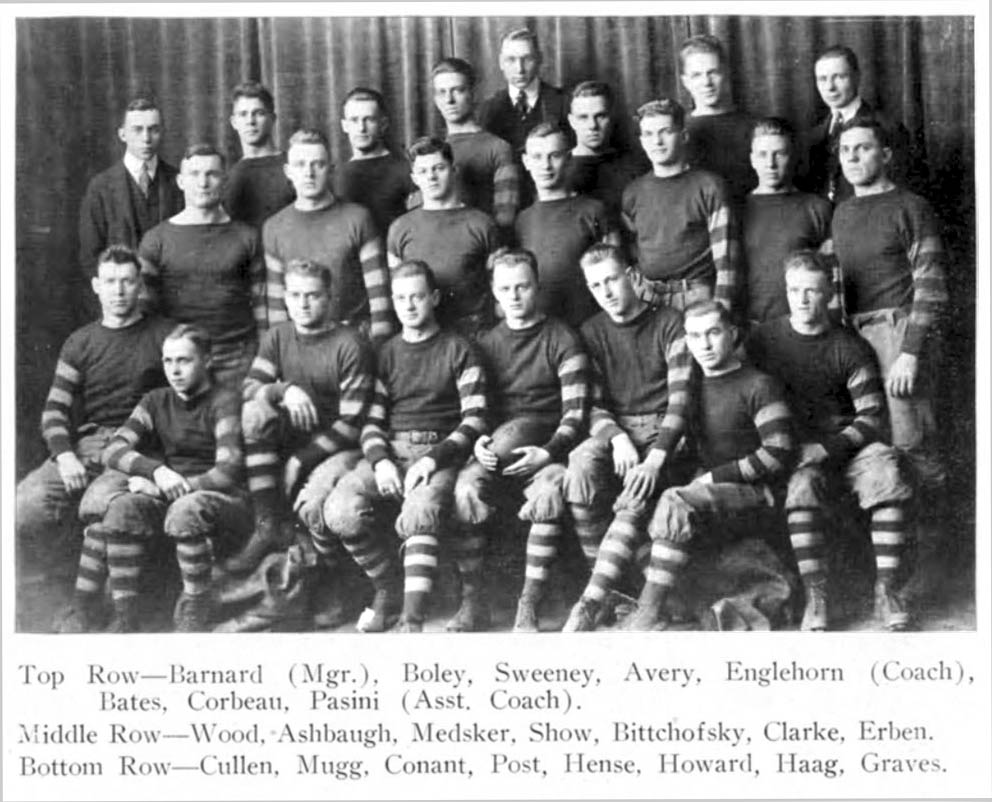
- Conference: Ohio Athletic Conference
- Record: 5–5 (4–3 OAC)
- Head coach: Wesley Englehorn (3rd season)
- Home stadium: Van Horn Field

1916 Ohio Athletic Conference football standings
	Conf.					Overall
Team	W		L		T	W		L		T
Miami (OH) $	6	–	0	–	1	7	–	0	–	1
Mount Union	6	–	1	–	0	8	–	2	–	0
Denison	5	–	0	–	2	5	–	1	–	2
Ohio	4	–	1	–	1	5	–	2	–	1
Wooster	5	–	2	–	0	6	–	2	–	0
Case	4	–	3	–	0	5	–	5	–	0
Ohio Wesleyan	2	–	2	–	2	2	–	3	–	2
Western Reserve	3	–	4	–	0	3	–	7	–	0
Akron	2	–	4	–	0	2	–	7	–	0
Ohio Northern	2	–	5	–	0	3	–	7	–	0
Kenyon	2	–	5	–	0	2	–	7	–	0
Wittenberg	0	–	5	–	1	2	–	5	–	2
Cincinnati	0	–	6	–	1	0	–	8	–	2
Baldwin–Wallace	0	–	1	–	0	0	–	2	–	0
Oberlin	0	–	5	–	0	0	–	7	–	0
Ohio State *	3	–	0	–	0	7	–	0	–	0
$ – Conference champion; * – did not complete for championship

The 1916 Case Scientists football team represented the Case Institute of Technology during the 1916 college football season. The team compiled a 5–5 record and outscored their opponents 158 to 145. Head Coach was Wesley Englehorn who was assisted by Pat Pasini.

== Schedule ==
Date	Opponent	Site	Result
September 30	at Notre Dame*	Cartier Field; South Bend, IN	L 0–48
October 7	at Michigan*	Ferry Field; Ann Arbor, MI	L 3–19
October 14	Kenyon	Van Horn Field; Cleveland, OH	W 48–0
October 21	at Mount Union	Alliance, OH	W 12–0
October 28	Wooster	Van Horn Field; Cleveland, OH	W 27–0
November 4	at Ohio Wesleyan	Delaware, OH	L 7–16
November 11	at Oberlin	Oberlin, OH	W 41–0
November 18	Ohio State	Van Horn Field; Cleveland, OH	L 0–28
November 25	Hiram*	Van Horn Field; Cleveland, OH	W 14–7
November 30	Western Reserve	Van Horn Field; Cleveland, OH	L 6–27
*Non-conference game

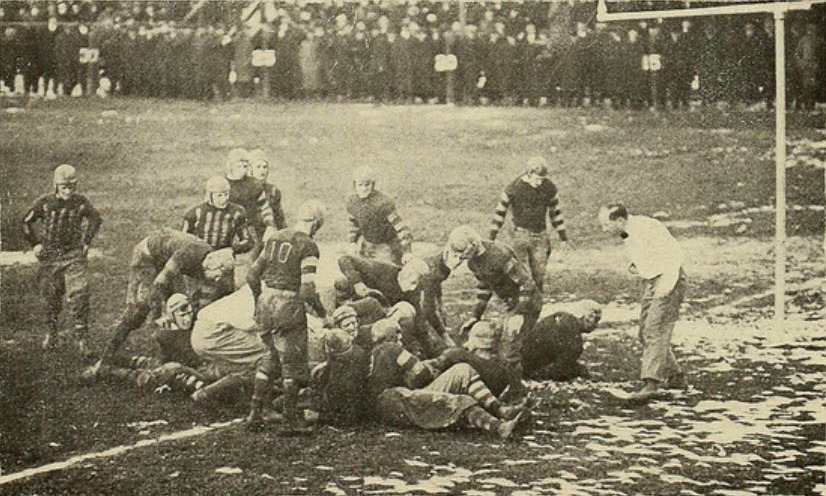
Ohio State scoring a touchdown against Case, while playing at Van Horn Field in University Circle, Cleveland, on November 18, 1916.
