= 1916 Miami Redskins football team =

American college football season

1916 Miami Redskins football

OAC champion
- Conference: Ohio Athletic Conference
- Record: 7–0–1 (6–0–1 OAC)
- Head coach: George Little (1st season)
- Home stadium: Miami Field

1916 Ohio Athletic Conference football standings
	Conf.					Overall
Team	W		L		T	W		L		T
Miami (OH) $	6	–	0	–	1	7	–	0	–	1
Mount Union	6	–	1	–	0	8	–	2	–	0
Denison	5	–	0	–	2	5	–	1	–	2
Ohio	4	–	1	–	1	5	–	2	–	1
Wooster	5	–	2	–	0	6	–	2	–	0
Case	4	–	3	–	0	5	–	5	–	0
Ohio Wesleyan	2	–	2	–	2	2	–	3	–	2
Western Reserve	3	–	4	–	0	3	–	7	–	0
Akron	2	–	4	–	0	2	–	7	–	0
Ohio Northern	2	–	5	–	0	3	–	7	–	0
Kenyon	2	–	5	–	0	2	–	7	–	0
Wittenberg	0	–	5	–	1	2	–	5	–	2
Cincinnati	0	–	6	–	1	0	–	8	–	2
Baldwin–Wallace	0	–	1	–	0	0	–	2	–	0
Oberlin	0	–	5	–	0	0	–	7	–	0
Ohio State *	3	–	0	–	0	7	–	0	–	0
$ – Conference champion; * – did not complete for championship

The 1916 Miami Redskins football team was an American football team that represented Miami University as a member of the Ohio Athletic Conference (OAC) during the 1916 college football season. In its first season under head coach George Little, Miami compiled a 7–0–1 record (6–0–1 against conference opponents), shut out six of eight opponents, and won the OAC championship.

The season was part of a 27-game unbeaten streak that began in November 1915 and ended in October 1919.

== Schedule ==
Date	Opponent	Site	Result
September 30	Ohio Northern	Miami Field; Oxford, OH	W 27–0
October 7	Earlham*	Miami Field; Oxford, OH	W 58–0
October 14	at Wooster	Wooster, OH	W 10–6
October 21	Kenyon	Miami Field; Oxford, OH	W 66–0
November 4	vs. Denison	Dayton, OH	T 0–0
November 11	at Ohio Wesleyan	Delaware, OH	W 9–0
November 18	Western Reserve	Miami Field; Oxford, OH	W 35–6
November 30	at Cincinnati	Cincinnati, OH (Victory Bell)	W 33–0
*Non-conference game
