= Dutch Sommer =

American football player and coach (1886–1942)

Biographical details
- Born: January 1, 1886; Pennsylvania, U.S.
- Died: April 1, 1942 (aged 56); Philadelphia, Pennsylvania, U.S.

Playing career
- 1908–1910: Penn
- Positions: Halfback, tackle

Coaching career (HC unless noted)
- 1912: Colgate
- 1913: Pennsylvania Military
- 1914–1915: Villanova
- 1916: Michigan Agricultural
- 1924: Villanova

Head coaching record
- Overall: 26–13–5

Frank A. "Dutch" Sommer (January 1, 1886 – April 1, 1942) was an American college football player and coach. He served as the head football coach at Colgate University (1912), Pennsylvania Military College—now known as Widener University (1913), Villanova College—now Villanova University (1914–1915, 1924), and Michigan Agricultural College—now Michigan State University (1916), compiling a career coaching record of 26–13–5. Sommer coached at Colgate in 1912, where he compiled a record of 5–2. He then coached at Villanova for 1914, 1915, and later for one season in 1924. His overall record there was 12–9–2. In his only season at Michigan Agricultural in 1916, Sommer led the Aggies to a 4–2–1 record. Sommer was an All-American halfback from the University of Pennsylvania. He earned a L.L.B. degree at Penn, graduating in 1913. Sommer died on April 1, 1942, at St. Mary's Hospital in Philadelphia.

== Head coaching record ==
Year	Team	Overall	Conference	Standing	Bowl/playoffs
Colgate (Independent) (1912)
1912	Colgate	5–2			
Colgate:		5–2			
Pennsylvania Military Cadets (Independent) (1913)
1913	Pennsylvania Military	5–0–2			
Pennsylvania Military:		5–0–2			
Villanova Wildcats (Independent) (1914–1915)
1914	Villanova	4–3–1			
1915	Villanova	6–1			
Michigan Agricultural Aggies (Independent) (1916)
1916	Michigan Agricultural	4–2–1			
Michigan Agricultural:		4–2–1			
Villanova Wildcats (Independent) (1924)
1924	Villanova	2–5–1			
Villanova:		12–9–2			
Total:		26–13–5			
