= 1916 Alma Maroon and Cream football team =

American college football season

1916 Alma Maroon and Cream football
- Conference: Michigan Intercollegiate Athletic Association
- Record: 5–4 ( MIAA)
- Head coach: Harry Helmer (1st season)

The 1916 Alma Maroon and Cream football team represented the Alma College during the 1916 college football season.

== Schedule ==
| Date | Opponent | Site | Result | Source |
|---|---|---|---|---|
| October 7 | Michigan State Normal | Ypsilanti, MI | W 6–0 | |
| October 14 | Michigan Agricultural | Alma, MI | L 0–33 | |
| October 20 | Central Michigan | Alma, MI | W 41–0 | |
| October 28 | Albion | Alumni Field; Albion, MI | L 10–20 | |
| | Michigan Agricultural freshmen | | W 27–7 | |
| November 8 | Central Michigan | Mount Pleasant, MI | W 40–0 | |
| November 11 | Olivet | Alma, MI | W 27–0 | |
| November 18 | Kalamazoo | Alma, MI | L 7–21 | |
| November 25 | at Notre Dame | Cartier Field; South Bend, IN | L 0–46 | |
