= Blake Miller (American football, born 1889) =

American football player and coach (1889–1987)

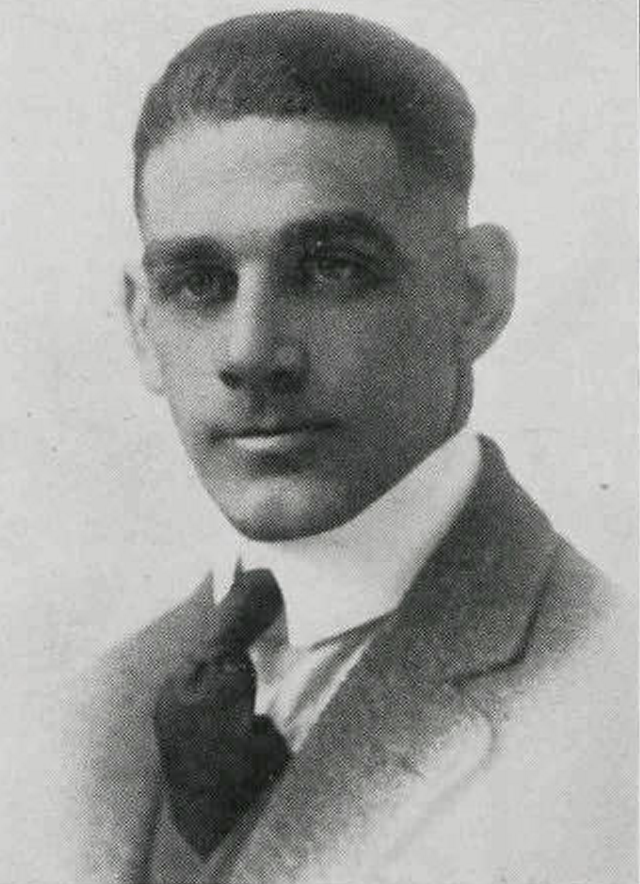

Biographical details
- Born: May 3, 1889; Tonawanda, New York, U.S.
- Died: January 9, 1987 (aged 97); Lansing, Michigan, U.S.

Playing career

Football
- 1912–1915: Michigan State
- 1920–1921: Detroit Heralds/Tigers
- Position: End

Coaching career (HC unless noted)

Football
- 1916: Central Michigan

Basketball
- 1916–1917: Central Michigan

Head coaching record
- Overall: 1–5 (football); 2–8 (basketball)

William Blake Miller (May 3, 1889 – January 9, 1987) was an American football player and coach.

Miller played college football at Michigan Agricultural College (now known as Michigan State University) from 1912 to 1915. He was selected as the captain of the 1915 team and a first-team end on the 1914 All-Western college football team. In November 1915, Miller was declared ineligible to compete further in intercollegiate athletics after it was revealed that he had played in two professional football games with the Detroit Heralds.

After leaving college, Miller served as the head coach of the Central Michigan Chippewas football team in 1916 and compiled a 1–5 record. In 1919, he returned to Michigan Agricultural College as an assistant coach responsible for the backfield.

Miller also played professional football in the first two seasons of the National Football League (NFL). He appeared in two games for the Detroit Heralds in 1920 and in three games for the Detroit Tigers in 1921.

Miller died in 1987 from injuries suffered in a fire at his home in Lansing, Michigan at the age of 97. He was inducted into the Michigan State Athletics Hall of Fame in 2005.

== Head coaching record ==
=== Football ===
Year	Team	Overall	Conference	Standing	Bowl/playoffs
Central Michigan Normalites (Independent) (1917)
1916	Central Michigan	1–5			
Central Michigan:		1–5			
Total:		1–5			
