= Indiana College Athletic League =

College sports conference in Indiana, 1902–1922

- Founded: 1902
- Folded: 1922
- Sports fielded: 6 (baseball, football, track, basketball, tennis, cross country)
- No. of teams: 5 (charter), 8 (total)

The Indiana College Athletic League (ICAL) was formed in December 1902 to govern intercollegiate competition in male sports for the smaller colleges of Indiana. Its members had all previously belonged to the Indiana Intercollegiate Athletic Association (IIAA), the state's first athletic conference, established in 1890.

== Founding ==
The ICAL was founded on December 13, 1902, in a meeting held at the Denison House Hotel in Indianapolis, concurrent with the annual meeting of the IIAA, which had convened at a nearby location. The founding members were Earlham, Franklin, Hanover, Rose Polytechnic, and Wabash. Of the five, Franklin and Hanover had already quit the IIAA. Earlham likewise left the IIAA in 1903, while Rose Polytechnic and Wabash remained active members of both organizations until 1907. Indiana State joined the ICAL in 1904. DePauw joined in 1910, one year after leaving the IIAA, while Butler joined in 1914, eleven years after leaving the IIAA. With the addition of Butler, the ICAL reunited all former members of the IIAA except the state's "big three" major college programs: Indiana, Purdue, and Notre Dame.

The governance of the ICAL reflected the transitional era in which it existed. Initially, like the IIAA, it included student-athletes and student managers of athletic teams in the governance of the organization. As late as 1911, student delegates represented member institutions at the annual meeting. A revision of the ICAL constitution, submitted for approval at the December 1906 annual meeting, confirmed that faculty representatives of league members would run the organization, through "a faculty conference on which no athletic instructor can serve." The change was made to "establish a better spirit between colleges and also to remedy any taint of unfair enrollment of players." Apparently this had been a problem in the league's first years, when the athletic directors (who also served as all-sport coaches and physical education instructors) had played a greater role in running the organization, along with the athletes themselves. Nevertheless, at least by the later years of its existence, athletic directors were among those serving annual terms as league president.

== History ==
Founded in the middle of the 1902–3 academic year, the ICAL held its first championship in track in the spring of 1903, before adding football in the fall of 1903. From the start, baseball was considered a conference sport, and tennis was added in the spring of 1905. Basketball finally became a "recognized sport" in 1906–7. In its last years, the ICAL added a sixth sport, cross country. Despite consisting of a relatively small number of like-minded institutions, the ICAL failed to adopt a centralized approach to scheduling team sports, and its unbalanced schedules made crowning conference champions problematic when there was no clear-cut dominant team. In the early years of the league (1903–7), the additional factor of some members having dual ICAL and IIAA membership muddied the waters even more.

The ICAL solidified as the move to separate the state's larger and smaller athletic programs accelerated. This occurred after 1907, when the Western Conference (as the Big Ten was then known) voted to prevent its members from playing any opponents that did not conform to "the conference rules of eligibility," including a rule barring freshmen from varsity competition. This decision dealt a severe blow to the IIAA, whose most dominant members were also members of the Western Conference, Purdue (since 1896) and Indiana (since 1899). To facilitate their dual membership, in 1900 the constitution of the IIAA had been amended to follow the eligibility rules of the Western Conference. But the association had not enforced the freshman rule (because its smaller members had too few athletes on campus to field teams without freshmen), and prior to 1907 the Western Conference had not pressed the issue. When it finally did, Notre Dame aligned with Indiana and Purdue in insisting the rule be followed, completing the separation of the major athletic powers from the rest of the state's colleges. The IIAA continued to exist after 1907, but its only official events were an annual track meet and tennis tournament, which remained open to participation by the smaller schools as long as their rosters conformed to Western Conference rules, including the ban on freshmen. The schools that had joined the ICAL could also continue to schedule the "big three" in football, baseball, or basketball (and sometimes did so, for the money or the prestige), as long as they honored the freshman rule in those contests.

In 1919, one sportswriter lamented that the league had never been able to resolve its most basic problem: how to determine champions without coherent league schedules. In too many cases, "the college which has the best athletic publicity manager, other things being equal, is accorded first place." The conference track meet alone produced a definitive winner. The tennis tournament, with its separate brackets for singles and doubles and no points system for determining team scores, could crown an institutional champion only if athletes from the same school won both brackets. Creative solutions were discussed but not adopted, such as having the ICAL's governing board (consisting of one representative from each member institution) pick the top two football teams for a season-ending playoff game in Indianapolis, or the top two baseball teams for a playoff game at the site of the league's track meet in May. There was even talk of a postseason tournament in basketball, something no other conference in the country had yet attempted.

== Demise ==
The ICAL had a full complement of eight members for only two years, from 1914 to 1916. Following the 1916 football season, DePauw quit the league in a dispute involving Butler scheduling a home game with Franklin on the same day as the Wabash-DePauw game, which at the time was a neutral site contest played in Indianapolis. The allegation that the competing game in Indianapolis hurt the gate for what would have been the primary football attraction on that day echoed a similar dispute that had roiled the IIAA in 1894, also involving DePauw. On that occasion, too, DePauw had left the conference in protest; this time, it never returned. Three years later, Hanover (which had struggled to compete in the ICAL, other than in tennis), dropped out as well. Finally, in 1920, Wabash also left the conference, but for the opposite reason, to take advantage of the opportunity to play more major college teams, especially in football.

Just as they discussed creative ideas for determining league champions but never acted on them, ICAL members likewise discussed replacing departed members but never did so, even as more of Indiana's smaller colleges, in the aftermath of World War I, began launching athletic programs of their own. The league was also slow to copy policies that had worked for others; for example, in 1915 the IIAA revitalized its track meet by declaring it to be an "open" event, at which Indiana, Purdue, and Notre Dame would abide by Western Conference eligibility rules (barring freshmen) while other participating schools could have freshmen in their squads. The meet ultimately attracted not just ICAL members, but also smaller colleges not in the ICAL. The ICAL finally opened up its track meet to non-members and attracted some of the same smaller colleges, though not until 1921. By the following year, negotiations were well underway to replace both the IIAA and the ICAL with a comprehensive state athletic association that could accommodate the needs of the "big three" as well as the smaller schools, and coherently govern their interactions with each other. With the founding of the Indiana Intercollegiate Conference later in 1922, the ICAL ceased to exist.

== Baseball champions ==
- 1916:
- 1917:
- 1918:
- 1919: Indiana State
- 1920: Indiana State
- 1921: Indiana State
- 1922:

== Basketball champions ==
- 1918–19: Franklin
- 1919–20:
- 1920–21: Butler
- 1921–22: Butler

== Football champions ==
- 1903: Earlham
- 1904: Wabash
- 1915: Wabash
- 1916: Wabash
- 1917: Rose Polytechnic
- 1918: No champion (World War I)
- 1919: Wabash
- 1920: Butler
- 1921: Butler

== Tennis champions ==
- 1905: Hanover
- 1906: Hanover
- 1913: Earlham
- 1919: Hanover
- 1921: Butler

== Track and Field champions ==
- 1903: Earlham
- 1904: Earlham
- 1905: Rose Polytechnic
- 1906: Rose Polytechnic
- 1907: Wabash
- 1908: Wabash
- 1909: Earlham
- 1910: Earlham
- 1911: Earlham
- 1912: Wabash
- 1913: Earlham
- 1914: Wabash
- 1915: DePauw
- 1916: DePauw
- 1917: No champion (World War I)
- 1918: No champion (World War I)
- 1919: Wabash
- 1920: Earlham
- 1921: Earlham
- 1922: Earlham

== See also ==
- List of defunct college football conferences
