= 1916 Cincinnati Bearcats football team =

American college football season

1916 Cincinnati Bearcats football
- Conference: Ohio Athletic Conference
- Record: 0–8–1 (0–6–1 OAC)
- Head coach: Ion Cortright (1st season)
- Captain: Harold Altamer
- Home stadium: Carson Field

1916 Ohio Athletic Conference football standings
	Conf.					Overall
Team	W		L		T	W		L		T
Miami (OH) $	6	–	0	–	1	7	–	0	–	1
Mount Union	6	–	1	–	0	8	–	2	–	0
Denison	5	–	0	–	2	5	–	1	–	2
Ohio	4	–	1	–	1	5	–	2	–	1
Wooster	5	–	2	–	0	6	–	2	–	0
Case	4	–	3	–	0	5	–	5	–	0
Ohio Wesleyan	2	–	2	–	2	2	–	3	–	2
Western Reserve	3	–	4	–	0	3	–	7	–	0
Akron	2	–	4	–	0	2	–	7	–	0
Ohio Northern	2	–	5	–	0	3	–	7	–	0
Kenyon	2	–	5	–	0	2	–	7	–	0
Wittenberg	0	–	5	–	1	2	–	5	–	2
Cincinnati	0	–	6	–	1	0	–	8	–	2
Baldwin–Wallace	0	–	1	–	0	0	–	2	–	0
Oberlin	0	–	5	–	0	0	–	7	–	0
Ohio State *	3	–	0	–	0	7	–	0	–	0
$ – Conference champion; * – did not complete for championship

The 1916 Cincinnati Bearcats football team was an American football team that represented the University of Cincinnati as a member of the Ohio Athletic Conference during the 1916 college football season. In their first season under head coach Ion Cortright, the Bearcats compiled a 0–8–1 record (0–6–1 against conference opponents). Harold Altamer was the team captain. The team played home games at Carson Field in Cincinnati.

== Schedule ==
Date	Opponent	Site	Result	Source
September 30	at Wittenberg	Springfield, OH	T 0–0	
October 7	at Denison	Granville, OH	L 0–29	
October 14	Georgetown (KY)*	Carson Field; Cincinnati, OH	L 0–16	
October 24	at Ohio Northern	Ada, OH	L 0–9	
October 28	Kentucky*	Carson Field; Cincinnati, OH	L 0–27	
November 4	Wooster	Carson Field; Cincinnati, OH	L 0–20	
November 11	Ohio	Carson Field; Cincinnati, OH	L 10–33	
November 18	Kenyon	Carson Field; Cincinnati, OH	L 0–27	
November 30	Miami (OH)	Carson Field; Cincinnati, OH (Victory Bell)	L 0–33	
*Non-conference game
