= Cy DeGree =

American football player (1898–1964)

Profile
- Positions: Tackle, guard

Personal information
- Born: July 12, 1898; St. Cloud, Minnesota, U.S.
- Died: August 11, 1964 (aged 66); Oakland County, Michigan, U.S.
- Listed height: 6 ft 1 in (1.85 m)
- Listed weight: 210 lb (95 kg)

Career information
- High school: St. Cloud Tech
- College: Notre Dame

Career history
- Detroit Tigers (1921)

Career statistics
- Games played: 7
- Games started: 7
- Stats at Pro Football Reference

Walter Bernard "Cy" DeGree (July 12, 1898 – August 11, 1964), sometimes spelled "Degree" and "De Gree", was an American football player who played college football for Notre Dame and professional football for the Detroit Tigers.

Degree was born in 1894 in St. Cloud, Minnesota. He attended Technical Senior High School in St. Cloud. He played college football at Notre Dame from 1916 to 1917. He played at the tackle position and was also the team's star punter. Degree's college career was interrupted by military service during World War I. He was badly injured after being gassed in France, raising doubts as to whether he would ever play football again. Despite the injury, he returned to the Notre Dame football team in the fall of 1919. He played in the National Football League (then known as the American Professional Football Association) for the Detroit Tigers in 1921. He appeared in seven games at tackle and guard for the Tigers. He also did placekicking and kicked one field goal.
