= Earl H. Painter =

American college football player and coach, lawyer (1888–1969)

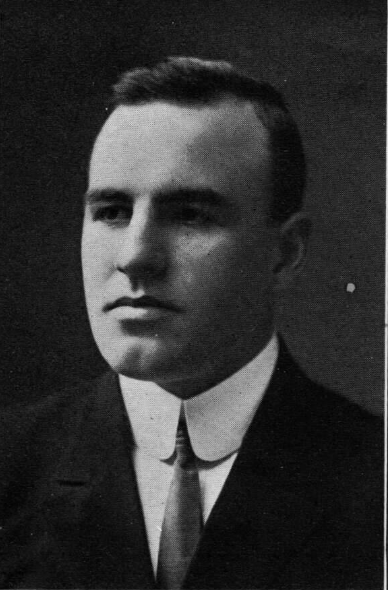
- Painter pictured in The Archive 1913, Saint Louis University yearbook

Biographical details
- Born: February 12, 1888; Streator, Illinois, U.S.
- Died: October 19, 1969 (aged 81); St. Louis, Missouri, U.S.

Playing career

Football
- 1909–1911: Saint Louis

Baseball
- 1912: Saint Louis
- Positions: Halfback (football); Third baseman (baseball)

Coaching career (HC unless noted)

Football
- 1915: Saint Louis (assistant)
- 1916: Saint Louis

Head coaching record
- Overall: 4–4

Earl Huntington Painter (February 12, 1888 – October 19, 1969) was an American college football player and coach and lawyer. He played college football as a halfback at Saint Louis University from 1909 to 1911, captaining the 1911 Saint Louis Billikens football team. Painter served as the head football coach at his alma mater in 1916.

A native of Streator, Illinois, Painter starred in football at Pekin High School in Pekin, Illinois. He was a member of the football team at Saint Louis from 1909 to 1911. He also played as a third baseman for the Saint Louis baseball team in 1912.

Painter graduated from the university in three years, earning a Bachelor of Laws degree in 1912. He volunteered to assist George Keogan in coaching the Saint Louis football team in 1915. Painter retired from coaching after the 1916 season, at which time he worked as an assistant to the general counsel for the Southwestern Bell Telephone Company in St. Louis. During World War I, he was commissioned as a lieutenant in the United States Army Signal Corps. He organized the 412th Telegraph Battalion and served overseas, reaching the rank of captain. After the war, he returned to Southwestern Bell in St. Louis and was promoted to general attorney in 1925 and general counsel in 1933. He was elected vice president of the company in October 1943 and director in 1944.

Painter died on October 19, 1969.

== Head coaching record ==
Year	Team	Overall	Conference	Standing	Bowl/playoffs
Saint Louis Billikens (Independent) (1916)
1916	Saint Louis	4–4			
Saint Louis:		4–4			
Total:		4–4			
