= Walter Niemann (American football) =

American football player (1894–1967)

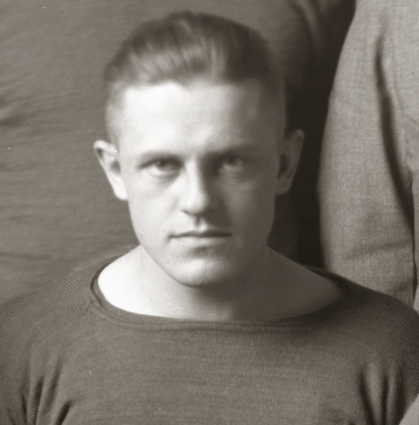

Profile
- Position: Center

Personal information
- Born: April 21, 1894; Hermansville, Michigan
- Died: December 5, 1967 (aged 73)

Career information
- College: Michigan

Career history
- 1915–1916: Michigan
- 1921: Lauerman Twins
- 1922–1924: Green Bay Packers

Walter Albert "Wallie" Niemann (April 21, 1894 – December 5, 1967) was an American football player. A native of Menominee in Michigan's Upper Peninsula, Niemann was an all around athlete at Menominee High School in Menominee, Michigan. He played center for the Michigan Wolverines football team from 1915 to 1916. He was the lightest starting center at the University of Michigan at 150 pounds. He played semi-professional football for the Lauerman Twins in 1921. The 1921 Twins team won the championship of Northeastern Wisconsin and the Upper Peninsula. He later played professional football for the Green Bay Packers from 1922 to 1924. Niemann was the starting center for Green Bay in the first game played between the Packers and the Chicago Bears. Niemann was inducted into the Upper Peninsula Sports Hall of Fame in 1974.

== See also ==
- 1915 Michigan Wolverines football team
- 1916 Michigan Wolverines football team
