= Fred Rehor =

American football player (1893–1959)

- Rehor's senior portrait from the 1917 "Michiganensian"

Profile
- Position: Guard

Personal information
- Born: December 15, 1893; Hastings, Michigan, U.S.
- Died: July 19, 1959 (aged 65); Canton, Ohio, U.S.
- Listed height: 6 ft 0 in (1.83 m)
- Listed weight: 256 lb (116 kg)

Career information
- College: Michigan

Career history
- 1914–1916: Michigan
- 1917: Massillon Tigers

Frederick Lee "Fritz" Rehor (December 15, 1893 – July 19, 1959) was an American football player. He played college football for Fielding H. Yost's Michigan Wolverines football teams from 1914 to 1916. He also played professional football and was a member of the 1917 professional football champion Massillon Tigers, coached by Knute Rockne. He later operated a drug store in Canton, Ohio.

== Early life ==
Rehor was born in Hastings, Michigan in 1893. His parents, Jacob and Louisa Rehor, emigrated to the United States from Germany. His father operated a buzz planer in a table factory.

== University of Michigan ==
Rehor attended the University of Michigan as a pharmacy student. He graduated in 1917. While attending Michigan, he was a member of the Sigma Phi Epsilon fraternity and played guard for Fielding H. Yost's Michigan Wolverines football teams from 1914 to 1916. Following a November 1916 game against Penn, The New York Times wrote: "The work of Rehor on the line ranked the best ever seen in Michigan. The husky 250-pounder outplayed Henning from start to finish, and broke through and nailed the backs for losses." In a summary of the 1916 season, The Michigan Alumnus wrote: "Of the linemen, Rehor was always prominent, breaking up numerous plays and showing an excellent nose for the ball. Many a spectator will long retain the mental image of the big guard catching a short kick-off and ploughing down the field with the ball."

== Professional football ==
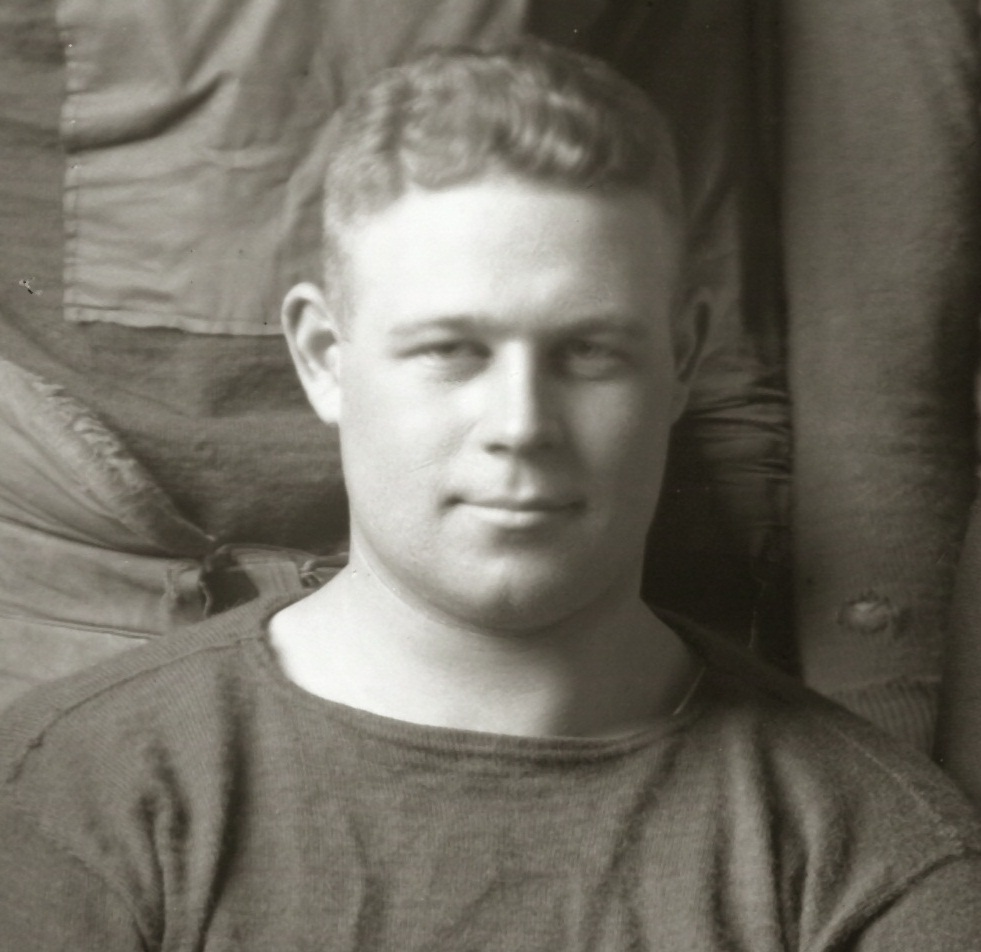
Rehor cropped from the 1916 Michigan team portrait

After graduating from Michigan, Rehor played professional football. In October 1917, he joined the Massillon Tigers. When it was announced that Rehor would join the Tigers, The Evening Independent in Massillon ran a feature story on Rehor, billing him as the "Newest Tiger Giant." The article noted:

"Rehor, who graduated from Michigan last spring, tips the beam at 255 pounds. He stands nearly six feet tall and was one of the big men on the Michigan eleven for three seasons. The Michigan giant will arrive here early Saturday morning. He comes here backed by a reputation of being one of the best linemen who played college foot ball in 1916. He should be a tower of strength to the Tiger line, especially when the big battles with Akron, Canton and Youngstown are staged."

Rehor started at right guard in Massillon's 14–6 victory over Buffalo. After the game, The Evening Independent wrote: "Rehor with his 256 odd pounds bowled over the visiting linemen and formed a defensive bulwark that couldn't be budged." After a 3–0 loss to Akron, the paper noted that the team put up a strong battle on defense with Rehor and Copley (playing at right guard and right tackle) playing "strong defensive games, tackling hard and accurately." In a 28–0 victory over the Columbus Panhandles, Rehor also handled kickoffs. After the game, the Massillon paper wrote: "Exhibiting the same stonewall defense that has characterized their play all season, the Tigers had little trouble in stopping the battering tactics of the Panhandles ... The visitors made four first down but three of them came on forward passes and the other on a penalty. Gains through the Tiger line were few and far between as Nash, Copley, Thornhill, Wesbecher, Rehor and Rambaud were in every mixup and dropped the heavy Panhandle backs in their tracks most of the time." During the fourth quarter of the last game of the regular season, Rehor got into a fight with "Unk" Russell of the Canton Bulldogs, and both were ejected by the referee. The Massillon newspaper reported: "Rehor claimed that Russell had slugged him in scrimmage. Fritz's fighting blood became warm and he wasn't long opening hostilities with the giant Pennsylvanian. Fists flew freely for a few seconds but the mix up was stopped without damage to either player."

The Tigers advanced to play Jim Thorpe's Canton Bulldogs in the 1917 Ohio League championship game on December 2, 1917. Prior to the game, the Massillon paper noted that the "former giant Michigan guard" had been "a tower of trength on the Tiger line this season." The Tigers were coached in the championship game by Knute Rockne and defeated the Bulldogs by a score of 6 to 0; Rehor was the starting left guard in the game.

== Family and later years ==
In April 1918, Rehor married Gertrude E. Ricker of Canton, Ohio. Following a quiet wedding ceremony in Canton, the couple left on a trip to Detroit and Hastings, Michigan. On their return, the couple planned to live in Canton, where Rehor was employed as a chemist at the Central Steel plant.

At the time of the 1920 U.S. Census, Rehor was living in Canton with his wife Gertrude; he was employed as a chemist in the steel industry. At the time of the 1930 U.S. Census, Rehor was living in Canton with his wife Gertrude (age 38), daughter Marilyn Jean Rehor (age 5) and son Richard Dale Rehor (age 11 months). He was employed as a merchant operating a retail drugstore. In 1941, Rehor was still living in Canton and operating a drug store. Rehor died in Canton in July 1959.
