= Cliff Sparks =

American football player (1896–1975)

Clifford M. Sparks
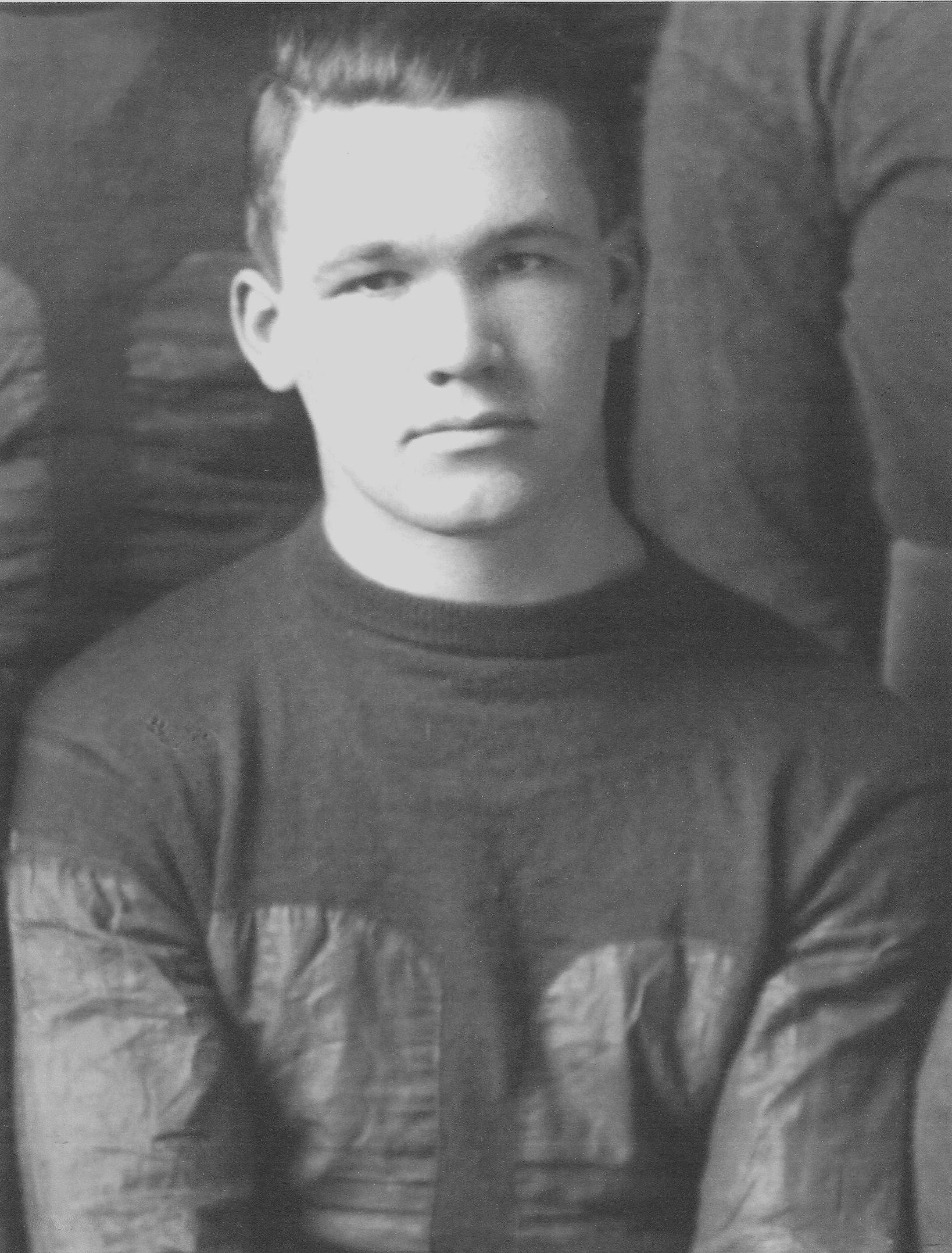

Profile
- Position: Quarterback

Personal information
- Born: September 24, 1896; Jackson, Michigan
- Died: February 5, 1975 (aged 78); Jackson, Michigan

Career information
- College: University of Michigan

Awards and highlights
- First-team All-American, 1916

Clifford Maurice Sparks (September 24, 1896 – February 5, 1975) was an American football player. He played quarterback for the University of Michigan Wolverines football team and was selected in 1916 as a first-team All-American by the New York sports writer Monty.

== Biography ==
Sparks was a native of Jackson, Michigan. He was the son of William C. and Matilda Sparks. William was a founding partner of the Sparks-Withington Company (later known as Sparton Corporation) and builder of the world famous Cascade Falls in Jackson. He was the son-in-law of Byron J. Carter, a founding partner of the Jackson Automobile Company. Sparks married Rachel Lucretia Carter May 12, 1920 in Jackson. They had three children: Carter, Sallie, and William. He weighed 153 pounds.

Sparks enrolled at the University of Michigan and joined the university’s football team coached by Fielding H. Yost. When Sparks arrived in Ann Arbor, the team had recently been led by All-American quarterback Tommy Hughitt. As a sophomore in 1916, Sparks took over the quarterback position and led the team to a 7-2 record. Prior to the opening game of the 1916 season, one Michigan newspaper wrote: "Sparks, the Jackson lad, is another back who has proved that he is ready to do his part and looks so much like 'Tommy' Hughitt in action that Yost has stopped worrying about his quarterback position." Yost told reporters before the season began that he believed Sparks would develop into "one of the best quarters Michigan has had in recent years."

Sparks played his first game for Michigan's varsity football team in the 1916 season opener, a 38-0 win over Marietta College. The Associated Press reported that "Michigan ground gaining was done through continuous hard smashing assaults upon the Marietta line with Captain Maulbetsch, Sparks and Raymond taking turns at scoring."

Three days later, Sparks played in a 19-3 win over Case, and the Associated Press wrote that "Sparks and Maulbetsch scored for Michigan."

Sparks received positive comments in the newspapers after Michigan beat Carroll College 54-0 in the third game of the season. While seven Michigan players scored in the game, one newspaper noted that "the whirlwind Sparks" was the only Michigan player with two touchdowns.

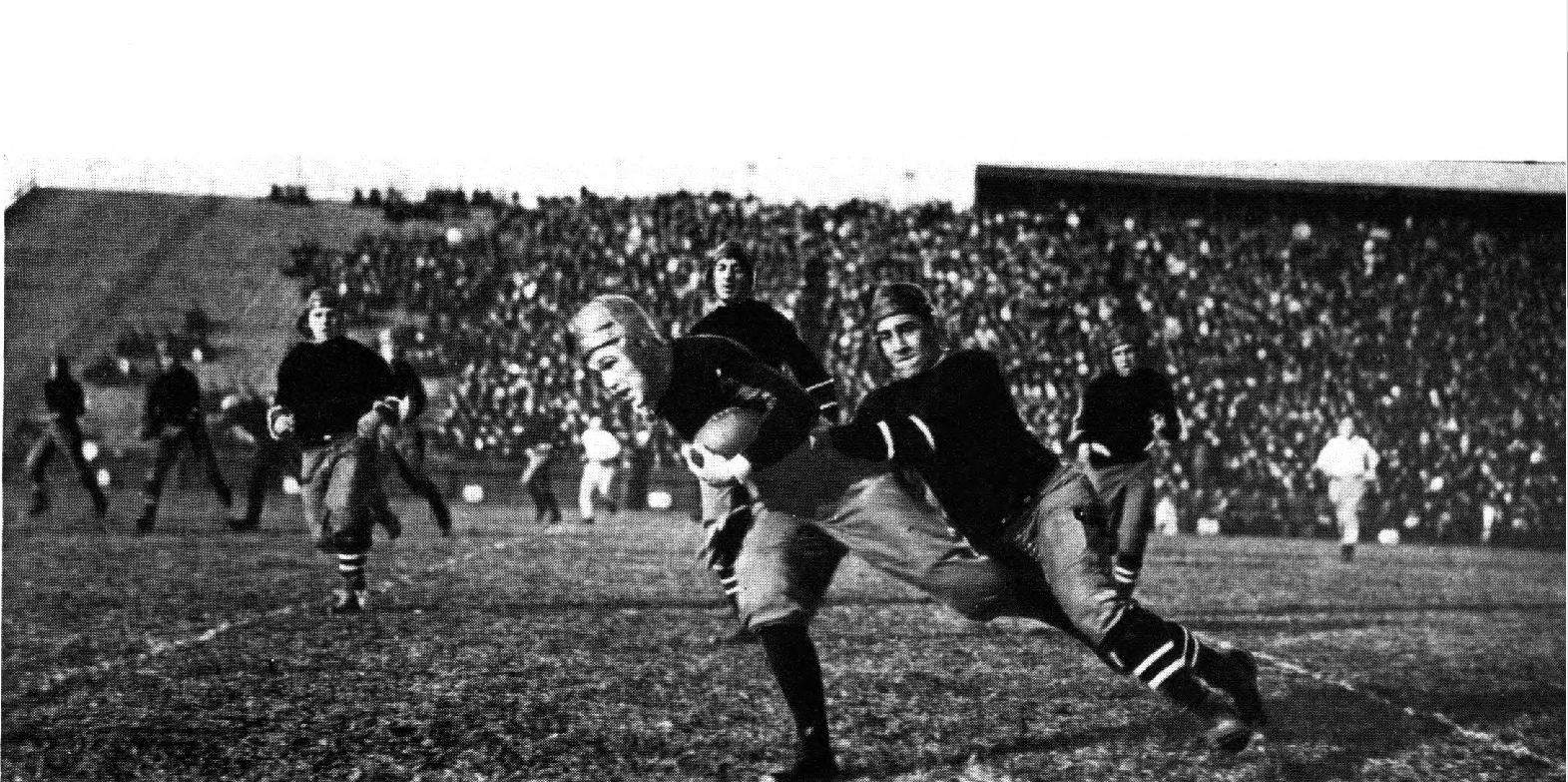
Sparks tackled but still gaining

Sparks gained national attention after his performance in Michigan's 9-0 win over the Michigan Agricultural College on October 21, 1916. The entire Michigan team gained a total of 200 yards rushing, and Sparks alone accumulated 107 yards of the total. According to one account of the game, Sparks "crumpled the Aggie line almost every time he crashed into it and circled ends with ease, and was eel-like in running back punts." The play that drew the most attention was Sparks' drop-kick on a broken play that gave Michigan a 3-0 lead in the first quarter. The play called for Sparks to take the snap from center and hold the ball for a field goal attempt. The snap from center was high, forcing Sparks to react quickly. One press account described Sparks' actions as follows:

"And then seemingly with a single movement, Sparks jumped to his feet, grabbed the ball as it was about to clear his head, whirled to face the goal posts and drop-kicked the ball over the Aggie bar for a count of three points, which then and there cinched the game for the Wolverines. 'It was the greatest individual play ever seen in my whole career as coach or player,' was 'Hurry Up' Yost's comment after the game. And every person in the crowd who saw Sparks plan and execute that play in something less than two seconds chanted 'Amen!'"

Following the broken play in the first quarter, Sparks sought to confuse the Aggie defense by signaling for a kick formation several times, and on each occasion Sparks did something else "to the utter bewilderment of the Aggies."

The Associated Press story ran with the headline, "SPARKS IS INDIVIDUAL STAR OF MICHIGAN," and reported: "Sparks was the star. He made spectacular runs of 10, 15 and 20 yards and directed his offense with good judgment." The United Press story ran under the headline "SPARKS, YOST’S FIND, STARS TWICE."

A Texas newspaper praised Sparks' "braininess" and called him "one of the greatest all-around gridironers that has flashed into view in many years." The Texas paper continued:

"The Wolverines have uncovered a quarterback – Clifford Sparks – whose brilliant work this – his first varsity – season ranks him among the most sensational performers in the western football world. Sparks has a chain-lightning brain; one that recognizes every opportunity in the minutest flash. And he has legs and arms that work in harmony. He has 'pulled' plays repeatedly that have disconcerted the Ann Arbor foes, put them to utter rout and brought gasps of astonishment from the stands because of their audacity and their remarkable execution. … Sparks ranks right now – in his first year as a Michigan regular – as the greatest quarterback Michigan ever has had. There is nothing he cannot do – and do in a way that thrills."

Sparks also drew attention for his unusual punting technique. While most punters at that time dropped the ball on the boot, Sparks had "mastered that difficult trick of successfully punting after throwing the ball, with force at the uprising boot." By throwing the ball at the shoe, Sparks was able to give his punts greater height and distance. The height of Sparks' punts allowed his teammates time to reach the punt receiver before the ball arrived. During the win over Michigan Agricultural, the longest gain on any of Sparks’ punts was two yards.

Sparks' coach, Fielding H. Yost, had acquired the nickname "Hurry Up" for the rapid style of play he instilled in his players. During the 1916, newspapers joked that, in Sparks, Yost had finally found a player who was such a quick runner and thinker that Yost had been forced to tell him to "slow down." A syndicated newspaper story reported:

"'Hurry Up' Yost, coach of the Michigan football squad, has finally failed to live up to his nickname. Yost recently was watching the first eleven in practice. Quarterback Sparks was tearing through his signals. 'He hurries too much,' shouted Yost and then he told Sparks to ease up a bit. ... And so, the Yost nickname, won in 1900, received its first setback."

At the end of the 1916 season, the sophomore Sparks was picked as a first-team All-American by New York sports writer, Monty. Nine of Monty's 1916 All-American played for East Coast colleges, with Sparks and Bob Higgins of Penn State as the only Westerners named to the team.

With the entry of the United States into World War I, Sparks' football career was interrupted by military service. During the 1917 season, Sparks started only two games at quarterback and one game at left halfback.

After World War I, Sparks returned to the University of Michigan. In 1919, he was the starting quarterback for six of the team's seven games and played halfback in the seventh game.

== See also ==
- Michigan Wolverines football All-Americans
- 1916 College Football All-America Team
