= Cedric C. Smith =

American football player (1895–1969)

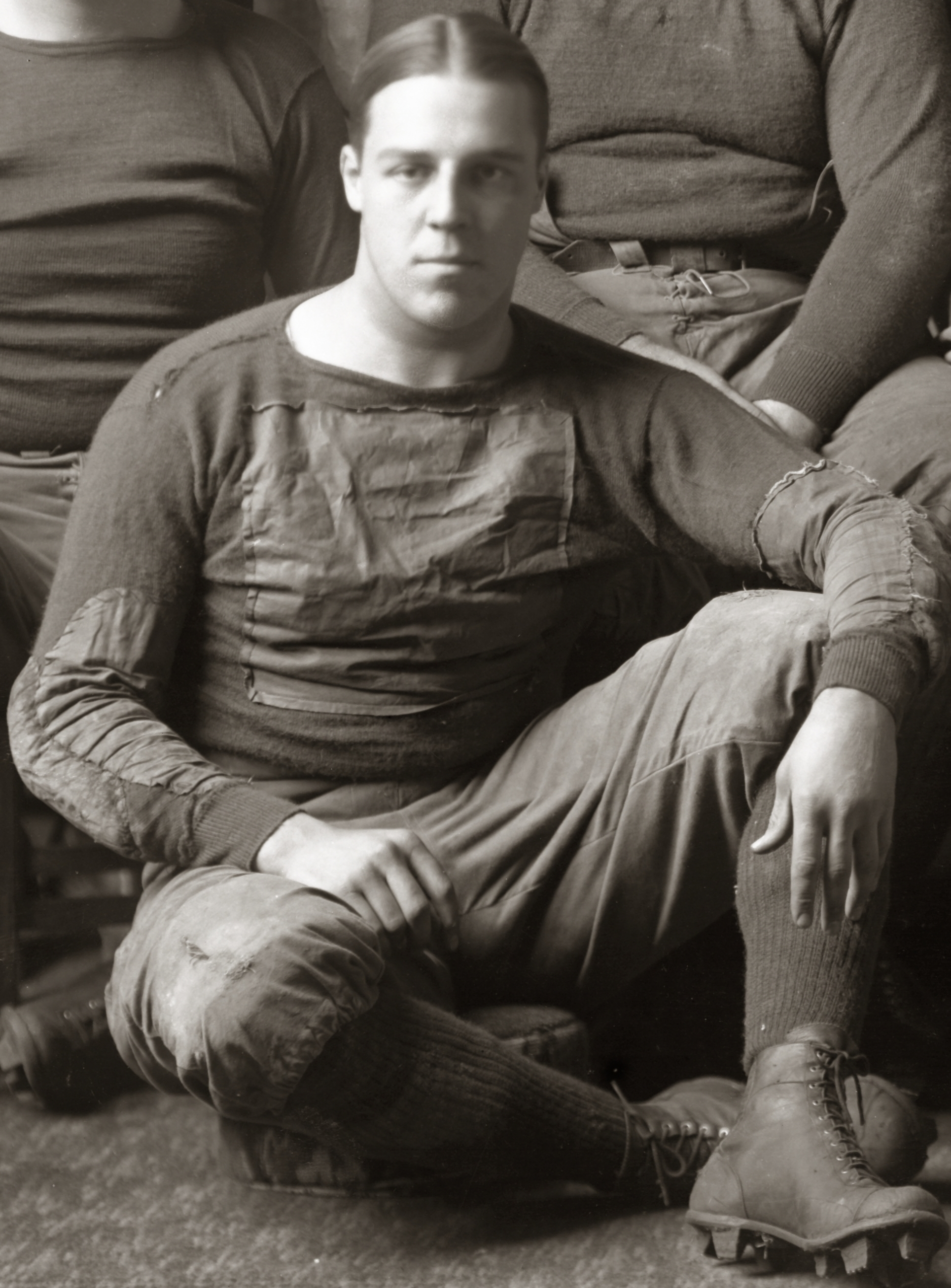
- Smith cropped from 1916 Michigan football team photograph

No. 4
- Position: Fullback

Personal information
- Born: March 12, 1895; Minneapolis, Minnesota, U.S.
- Died: April 23, 1969 (aged 74); Detroit, Michigan, U.S.
- Listed height: 6 ft 0 in (1.83 m)
- Listed weight: 198 lb (90 kg)

Career information
- High school: Eastern (Bay City, Michigan)
- College: Michigan (1915–1916)

Career history
- Massillon Tigers (1919); Buffalo All-Americans (1920–1921); Buffalo All-Americans (1923)

Career statistics
- Games played: 19
- Games started: 18
- Total touchdowns: 3

Cedric Crawford "Pat" Smith (March 12, 1895 – April 23, 1969) was an American football fullback who played for the University of Michigan (1915–1916), the Great Lakes Naval Training Station, and the Buffalo All-Americans (1920–1921, 1923). He was either the second or third leading scorer in the inaugural season of the National Football League (NFL), then known as the American Professional Football Association (APFA).

== Early life ==
Born in Minneapolis, Minnesota, Smith moved with his family to Bay City, Michigan, where he attended high school.

== University of Michigan ==
In 1914, Smith enrolled at the University of Michigan and played on the freshman football team. Smith was a standout on the freshman team, being compared with Michigan Agricultural star George E. Julian: "Smith weighs 190. He rips up the line in about the same manner as the Aggie terror." As a sophomore in 1915, Smith started five games at fullback. As a junior in 1916, he started seven games at fullback. Michigan's legendary coach, Fielding H. Yost, said of Smith: "Pat was a brilliant player ... fast, brainy and an excellent punter and passer. I would call him an all-around star. He was unfortunate in being injured on a number of occasions, but the following Saturday he was usually ready to put on another stellar performance." After the 1916 season, Smith's teammates selected him as captain of the 1917 Michigan Wolverines football team.

Smith was also a member of the Michigan track and field team in 1916, 1917 and 1919. He won the Big Ten Conference shot put title in 1919.

== World War I ==
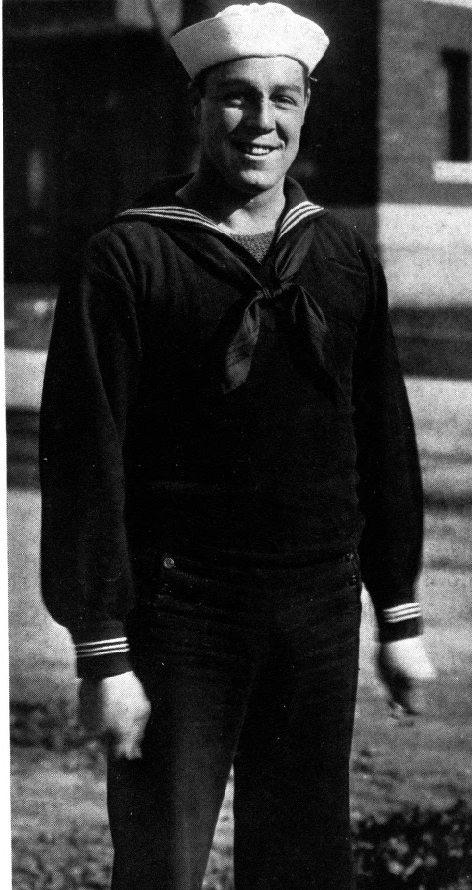
Cedric Smith, 1917

After submarines sank seven U.S. merchant ships and the publication of the Zimmermann Telegram, the United States declared war on Germany on April 6, 1917. Even before the formal declaration of war, Smith enlisted with the Ann Arbor naval reserves and by the end of April 1917, he was reported to be "somewhere in the east" serving his country. In honor of Captain Smith's actions, the Michigan football team voted to preserve his status as captain of the 1917 team, even though he spent the fall at the Great Lakes Naval Training Station. For the first time in the history of football at Michigan, the team had no active captain.

At the Great Lakes Naval Training Station, Smith was assigned to play on the unit's football team with other leading football players who were enlisted in the Navy. Smith was the captain and fullback for the Great Lakes team, a squad that beat the University of Iowa 14–7. For Thanksgiving, a special all-star match was played at Stagg Field in Chicago between players who were serving in the Army and Navy. Smith was the leader of the Navy team that defeated the Army 27–0. Newspaper accounts of the game report that Smith played a "brilliant game," as he "smashed his way over for two touchdowns."

With most of college football's top performers in the military service, Walter Camp did not select an All-American team in 1917. Instead, he selected an All-America Service team and named Smith as the fullback on that team.

After the war, Smith returned to Michigan, where he received his degree in 1919.

== Professional football ==
Smith played professional football for Massillon Tigers in 1919 and for the Buffalo All-Americans in the fledgling National Football League (then known as the American Professional Football Association) from 1920 to 1921 and in 1923. In 1920, the first season of the NFL's existence, Smith led Buffalo with four touchdowns. Though individual records from the 1920 NFL season are difficult to verify, sources indicate that Smith's 24 points placed him as either the second or third leading scorer in the league. In 1921, Buffalo's backfield included Smith at fullback, Elmer Oliphant at halfback, Ockie Anderson, and Tommy Hughitt at quarterback. With what was said to be the best backfield in the league, Buffalo finished in first place in 1921, compiling a 9–1–2 record and outscoring opponents 211–29. In November 1921, Buffalo played a game at Chicago's Cub Park in front of a large crowd, including "scores of Michigan men" who yelled for former Wolverine favorites, Smith and Hughitt. Smith played in only one NFL game after the 1921 season, a single game for Buffalo in 1923.

== Later life ==
In 1943, Smith was working at Ford Motor Company's Rouge plant in Detroit. At the time, the United Press reported on the assemblage of football greats who were then working at the plant, including Smith, Jim Thorpe, Harry Newman, Chuck Bernard, Jack Blott, and Stanley Fay.

Smith died at age 74, on April 23, 1969, at Henry Ford Hospital in Detroit.

== See also ==
- List of Michigan Wolverines football All-Americans
