= 1916 Wabash Little Giants football team =

American college football season

1916 Wabash Little Giants football

ICAL champion
- Conference: Indiana College Athletic League
- Record: 7–2 (5–0 ICAL)
- Head coach: Paul Sheeks (2nd season)

The 1916 Wabash Little Giants football team represented Wabash College during the 1916 college football season. Led by second-year head cooach Paul Sheeks, the Little Giants compiled an overall record of 7–2, and outscored their opponents 241 to 123.

== Schedule ==
Date	Opponent	Site	Result	Source
September 30	Rose Polytechnic	Crawfordsville, IN	W 24–0	
October 7	Hanover	Crawfordsville, IN	W 38–6	
October 14	at Purdue*	Stuart Field; West Lafayette, IN	L 7–28	
October 21	Butler	Crawfordsville, IN	W 56–0	
October 28	at Notre Dame*	Cartier Field; Notre Dame, IN	L 0–60	
November 4	Earlham	Crawfordsville, IN	W 56–9	
November 11	vs. DePauw	Indianapolis, IN	W 26–13	
November 25	at Marietta*	Marietta, OH	W 20–0	
November 30	at Marquette*	Milwaukee, WI	W 14–7	
*Non-conference game
