= 1916 Akron football team =

American college football season

1916 Akron football
- Conference: Ohio Athletic Conference
- Record: 2–7 (2–4 OAC)
- Head coach: Fred Sefton (2nd season)
- Captain: Ollie Driesbach
- Home stadium: Buchtel Field

1916 Ohio Athletic Conference football standings
	Conf.					Overall
Team	W		L		T	W		L		T
Miami (OH) $	6	–	0	–	1	7	–	0	–	1
Mount Union	6	–	1	–	0	8	–	2	–	0
Denison	5	–	0	–	2	5	–	1	–	2
Ohio	4	–	1	–	1	5	–	2	–	1
Wooster	5	–	2	–	0	6	–	2	–	0
Case	4	–	3	–	0	5	–	5	–	0
Ohio Wesleyan	2	–	2	–	2	2	–	3	–	2
Western Reserve	3	–	4	–	0	3	–	7	–	0
Akron	2	–	4	–	0	2	–	7	–	0
Ohio Northern	2	–	5	–	0	3	–	7	–	0
Kenyon	2	–	5	–	0	2	–	7	–	0
Wittenberg	0	–	5	–	1	2	–	5	–	2
Cincinnati	0	–	6	–	1	0	–	8	–	2
Baldwin–Wallace	0	–	1	–	0	0	–	2	–	0
Oberlin	0	–	5	–	0	0	–	7	–	0
Ohio State *	3	–	0	–	0	7	–	0	–	0
$ – Conference champion; * – did not complete for championship

The 1916 Akron football team represented the University of Akron, formerly Buchtel College, in the 1916 college football season. The team was led by head coach Fred Sefton, in his second season. Akron was outscored by their opponents by a total of 90–183. In their first game of the season, a 53–0 win over Baldwin-Wallace, the team recorded its 50th win in program history.

== Schedule ==
Date	Opponent	Site	Result
September 30	Baldwin–Wallace	Buchtel Field; Akron, OH	W 53–0
October 7	Wooster	Buchtel Field; Akron, OH	L 7–29
October 14	Western Reserve	Buchtel Field; Akron, OH	L 3–14
October 21	Heidelberg*	Buchtel Field; Akron, OH	L 0–6
October 28	at Mount Union	Alliance, OH	L 0–26
November 4	at Ohio Northern	Ada, OH	W 14–7
November 11	Denison	Buchtel Field; Akron, OH	L 6–34
November 18	Hiram*	Buchtel Field; Akron, OH	L 7–34
November 25	at Allegheny*	Meadville, PA	L 0–33
*Non-conference game
