= Virginia Tech Hokies football =

College Football Bowl Subdivision team

2026 Virginia Tech Hokies football team
- First season: 1892; 134 years ago
- Athletic director: Brian White
- General manager: Andy Frank
- Head coach: James Franklin; 1st season, 6–3 (.667)
- Location: Blacksburg, Virginia
- Stadium: Lane Stadium (capacity: 65,632)
- Field: Worsham Field
- NCAA division: Division I FBS
- Conference: ACC
- Colors: Chicago maroon and burnt orange
- All-time record: 787–522–46 (.598)
- Bowl record: 14–22 (.389)

National finalist
- BCS: 1999

Conference championships
- SAIAA: 1909, 1916, 1918 SoCon: 1963 Big East: 1995, 1996, 1999 ACC: 2004, 2007, 2008, 2010

Division championships
- ACC Coastal: 2005, 2007, 2008, 2010, 2011, 2016
- Consensus All-Americans: 8
- Rivalries: Virginia (rivalry); West Virginia (rivalry); Miami (rivalry); Georgia Tech (rivalry); Boston College (rivalry); VMI (rivalry)

Uniforms
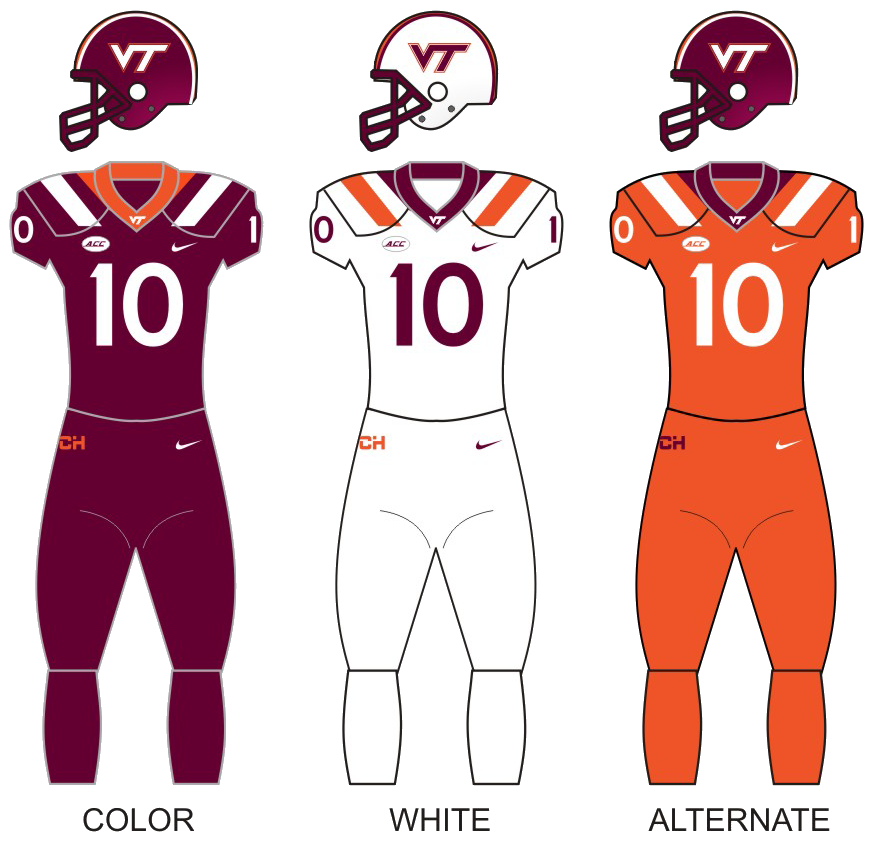
- Fight song: Tech Triumph
- Mascot: HokieBird, Gobbler
- Marching band: The Marching Virginians and The Highty-Tighties
- Outfitter: Nike
- Website: hokiesports.com

The Virginia Tech Hokies football team represents the Virginia Polytechnic Institute and State University in the sport of American football. The Hokies compete in the Football Bowl Subdivision (FBS) of the National Collegiate Athletic Association (NCAA) and the Coastal Division of the Atlantic Coast Conference. They previously competed in the Big East. Their home games are played at Lane Stadium, located in Blacksburg, Virginia, with a seating capacity of over 65,000 fans. Lane Stadium is considered to be one of the loudest stadiums in the country, being voted number two in ESPN's 2007 "Top 20 Scariest Places to Play". It was also recognized in 2005 by Rivals.com as having the best home-field advantage in the country.

Since beginning football in 1892, the Hokies have won over 700 games and appeared in 33 bowl games, including the 2000 BCS National Championship game. The Hokies rank 23rd among all Division I college football teams for most wins. The program had a streak of 27 consecutive bowl appearances, starting with the 1993 Independence Bowl and lasting through the 2019 Belk Bowl. This was fourth-longest streak of consecutive bowl game appearances in college football history. The program has also claimed eleven conference titles (3 South Atlantic, 1 Southern, 3 Big East, and 4 ACC) and produced eight Consensus All-Americans.

== History ==
=== Early history ===
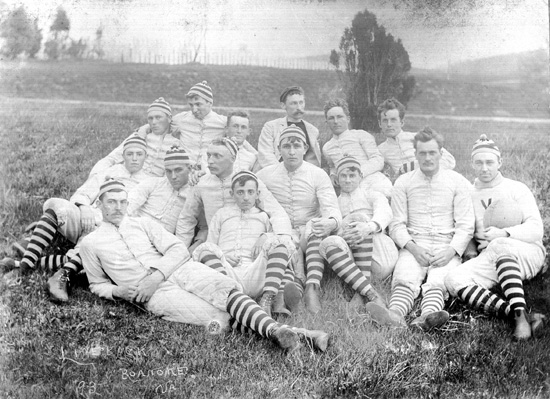
Virginia Tech's inaugural football team in 1892

Virginia Agricultural and Mechanical College (now Virginia Tech) first played football on October 21, 1892, against St. Albans Lutheran Boys School (Radford, Virginia). The game took place on a plowed off wheat field that was "about as level as a side of Brush Mountain". The Hokies won their first game 14–10, but were defeated 10–0 eight days later on a return trip to Radford. The first several VAMC teams wore cadet gray and black, but in 1896 the colors were changed to Burnt Orange and Chicago Maroon – a color combination that was unique among educational institutions at the time.

The 1899, 1901, and 1903 teams lost only to rival Virginia. Star player Hunter Carpenter returned to Virginia Tech in 1905, after a year at the University of North Carolina, for a last shot at beating Virginia. Carpenter helped lead VPI to a 9–1 record, the best in school's history up to that time. He was never named to the All-America team only because Walter Camp, who named the team at the time, said he would never name a player who he had not seen play.

The 1909 team claim a southern championship. This is the first season the team was referred to in print as the "Gobblers,” which became the official nickname in 1912.

=== SAIAA years (1912–1921) ===
At the end of the 1911 season, VPI joined the South Atlantic Intercollegiate Athletic Association (SAIAA). They won the conference in 1916 and 1918. After 1921, the SAIAA was dissolved and six of its schools became founding members of the Southern Conference.

=== SoCon years (1922–1964) ===
From 1925 to 1928, Tech was led by Frank Peake and the "Pony Express" backfield. He was joined by Scotty MacArthur, Herbert "Mac" McEver and Tommy Tomko. In 1927, during a 6–0 upset of the Colgate Red Raiders in New York, Peake ran for nearly 200 yards and scored the game's only points. During one three-game stretch, he accumulated rushing and return yardage of 306, 314 and 353 yards. He was credited with gaining 1,761 yards in eight games. 930 were from scrimmage, and 831 on punts and kickoffs. In 1928 the game against Virginia he came off the sideline with an injured hip to return a punt for a touchdown.

In 1932, Tech upset Georgia 7–6. Bill Grinus blocked the tying extra point.

Virginia Tech's first post-season bowl appearance was in the 1947 Sun Bowl in El Paso, Texas, against the University of Cincinnati. Tech had a 3–3–3 record that year, and was the third choice after Border Conference champions Hardin–Simmons University and runner-up Texas Tech Red Raiders both declined the bowl invitation. Tech lost that game 18–6.

Another first for the Gobblers came in 1954 when they had their first, and only, unbeaten season in school history. The team was 8–0–1 and finished ranked 16th in the Associated Press post-season football poll. The team's lone blemish was a 7–7 tie against William & Mary in Blacksburg, Virginia. Despite the team's success, it did not appear in a post-season bowl game. The 1963 team captured Tech's only outright SoCon championship.

=== 1970s ===
In the 1970s, Tech briefly adopted an aggressive passing offense under head coach Charlie Coffey; quarterback Don Strock set virtually every passing record in the Hokies' book and would hold many for 30 years or more. Success, though, remained elusive.

=== Bill Dooley era (1978–1986) ===
In the early 1980s, football coach and athletic director, Bill Dooley spearheaded a campaign for a new look and name for the mascot, which debuted at the 1981 football game against Wake Forest. The turkey-like figure was referred to as "the Hokie mascot", "the Hokie", and "the Hokie bird" (derived from the "Old Hokie" cheer), which resulted in changing the official designation of the Virginia Tech mascot to the Hokies. Dooley led the Hokies to the program's first-ever bowl win, in the 1986 Peach Bowl over NC State, but he also earned the program NCAA sanctions that led to his resignation that very offseason (after which he promptly sued the school).

=== Frank Beamer era (1987–2015) ===
Though many hoped for recently departed Maryland coach Bobby Ross, athletic director Dutch Baughman turned to Frank Beamer, a Hokie alumnus and defensive back from 1966 to 1968. Beamer had worked his way up the assistant coaching ladder since his 1969 graduation before spending six seasons in the head job at Murray State. Among the assistants Beamer brought with him from the Racers was linebackers coach Bud Foster, who had joined Beamer's first Murray State staff as a graduate assistant immediately upon his own graduation there.

Virginia Tech joined the Big East Conference for football play in 1991 (later joined for all sports in 2000). The Hokies were competitive in the new league early on, but could never beat annual foe, the Miami Hurricanes, despite eventually having a 6–6 record vs. the Hurricanes during the Big East years. In 1993, the Hokies earned a trip to the Independence Bowl in Shreveport, Louisiana, its first bowl game under Beamer. With a win in that game, the Hokies notched only the fourth nine-win season in school history at the time. It became the first of 23 straight bowl games under Beamer, until he retired in 2015.

1995 season

After finally beating the Hurricanes during the 1995 regular season, the 13th ranked Hokies clinched a berth in the Sugar Bowl in New Orleans, Louisiana–the program's first appearance in a major bowl game. They beat the 9th ranked Texas Longhorns 28–10. This was a signature win for the Hokies, capping the most successful season to date; it became turning point for the program as a whole.

1999 season

Virginia Tech's most successful football season was in 1999 under the guidance of redshirt freshman quarterback, Michael Vick. Among other amazing moments, on November 3, the Hokies came from behind on the road, to win against the West Virginia Mountaineers. Vick led a desperate last minute drive that culminated in a dramatic Shayne Graham game-winning field goal. The 22–20 victory has since become known as the "Miracle in Morgantown." The team completed the year with its first ever undefeated regular season, finishing with an (11–0) record. On January 4, 2000, the Hokies faced the Florida State Seminoles in the 2000 Sugar Bowl for the national championship. A back and forth game, the Hokies trailed 28–7 late in the second quarter but came back to take a 29–28 lead at the start of the fourth. However, they were not able to hold on and the Seminoles won 46–29. The Hokies finished third in the AP Poll and second in the Coaches Poll–in both cases, the highest final ranking in school history and the highest ever for a Division I team from the Commonwealth.

The following season, in 2000, the Hokies were again contenders for the national championship, but a loss to No. 3 Miami in early November, in a game in which Michael Vick was limited because of an injury, cost them a trip to the Orange Bowl. The Hokies later went on to defeat the Clemson Tigers 41–20 in the 2001 Gator Bowl in Jacksonville, Florida.

At the start of the 2004 season, the Hokies faced the No. 1 and eventual national champion USC Trojans in the BCA Classic played at FedExField in Landover, Maryland. The Hokies kept the game close, but eventually lost 24–13. The regular season ended with the Hokies winning the ACC championship in their first year in the conference and a return to the Sugar Bowl and a match-up with the Auburn Tigers. Auburn, the SEC champion and one of three undefeated teams (USC and Oklahoma being the other two), took a 16–0 lead into the fourth quarter. Led by senior quarterback Bryan Randall, the Hokies scored 13 points but fell just short of the comeback when the Tigers recovered an onside kick and ran out the clock.

The 2005 season saw many ups and downs, but would end in disappointment. Taking over for Bryan Randall was Marcus Vick, younger brother of Hokies great Michael Vick. The Hokies started off the season 8–0, including victories over West Virginia and ACC rivals Georgia Tech and Boston College. Going into the tenth week of the season, the Hokies were ranked 3rd in the country behind USC and Texas and would face the 5th ranked Miami Hurricanes at home. In anticipation of the match-up, ESPN's College Gameday would broadcast the game nationally from Blacksburg on ESPN. The Hurricanes controlled the game and limited Marcus Vick to only 90 yards passing to win 27–7.

Marcus Vick led the Hokies and went on to win the ACC Coastal Division title, but lost in the ACC Championship Game to Florida State. The Hokies again trailed the Seminoles by double digits at halftime, 27–3, but a Vick led comeback brought the score to 27–22 with 1:45 left in the fourth quarter. The Hokies were unable to recover the onside kick and lost their chance at a BCS Bowl berth.

The Hokies closed the season against the upstart Louisville Cardinals in the 2006 Gator Bowl. Virginia Tech won 35–24, but the game would become infamous for a play that would contribute to Vick's expulsion from the team. Late in the first half, with the Hokies trailing 17–10, Vick was tackled by Cardinals defensive end Elvis Dumervil. After the play, Vick stomped on Dumervil's leg, apparently out of anger. Four days after the game, Virginia Tech officials learned of two misdemeanor charges of speeding and driving on a suspended or revoked driver's license that Vick received on December 17, 2005. Vick had been suspended from school for the 2004 fall semester due to previous legal incidents in his college career, and had been told further incident would result in him being dismissed from the team. Virginia Tech dismissed Vick from the team on January 6, 2006, with the university citing "a cumulative effect of legal infractions and unsportsmanlike play."

Redshirt sophomore quarterback Sean Glennon was set to take over for Vick in the 2006 season. Although consecutive losses to Georgia Tech and Boston College knocked the Hokies out of contention for the ACC Championship Game, the Tech team finished the season strong, winning six in a row and being invited to the 2006 Chick-fil-A Bowl in Atlanta. In the annual ACC vs SEC match-up, the Hokies played the Georgia Bulldogs. At halftime the Hokies led 21–3, but four second half Glennon turnovers helped the Bulldogs in coming back and winning 31–24.

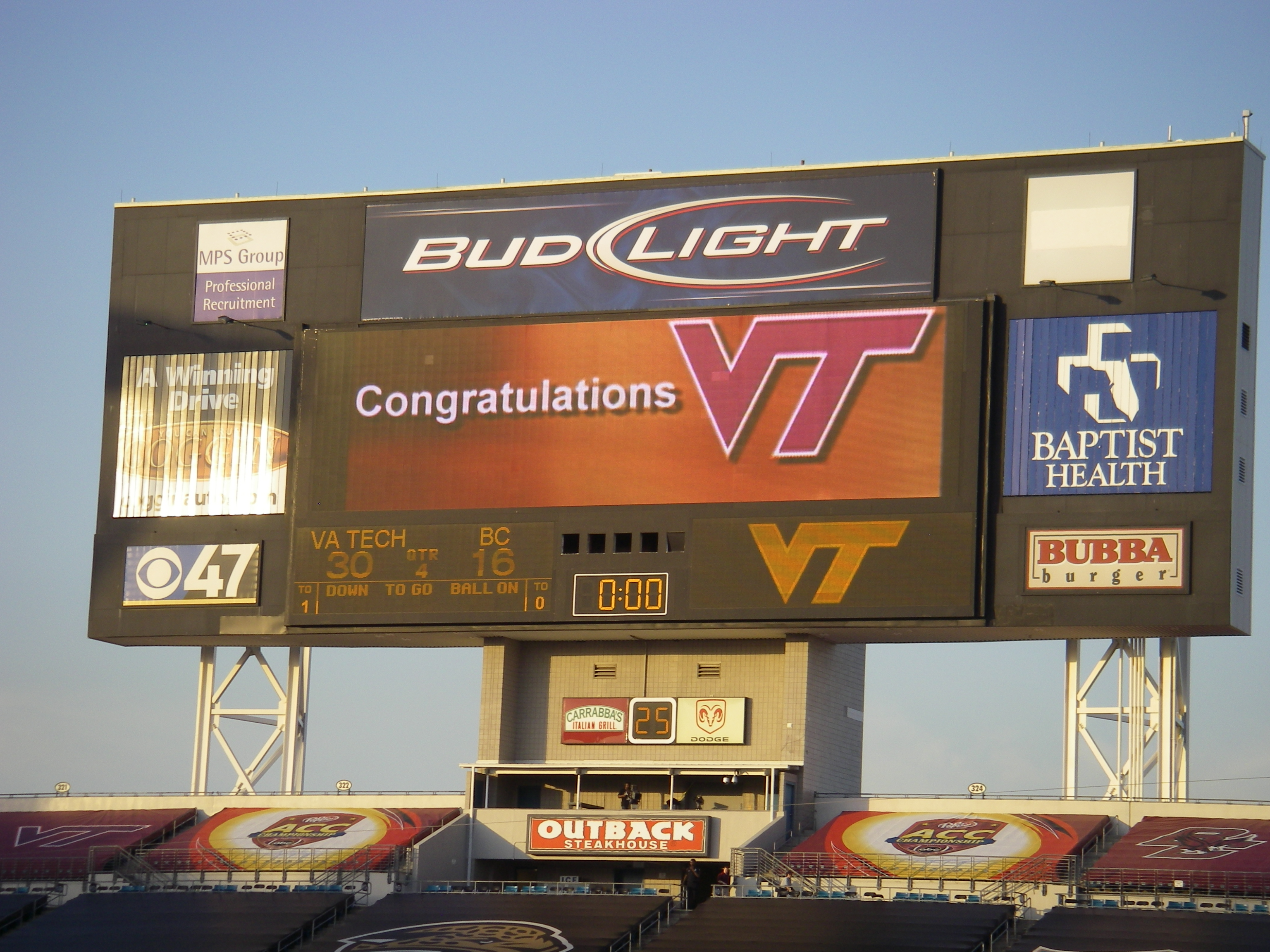
The final scoreboard of the 2007 ACC Championship Game records the 30–16 score and congratulates Virginia Tech on its victory.

After the April 2007 Virginia Tech shootings that stunned the campus and nation, the remainder of Tech's spring practice was canceled. The Hokies, led by running back Brandon Ore on offense and linebackers Vince Hall and Xavier Adibi looked to be in contention for a berth in the National Championship. The 2007 home opener against the East Carolina Pirates was the subject of College GameDay, and the Hokies prevailed in an emotional, albeit shaky, game 17–7. They then traveled to Baton Rouge, Louisiana, to play the LSU Tigers. In a game that saw Glennon replaced by true freshman quarterback Tyrod Taylor, the Hokies were completely dominated, only managing 149 total yards against the Tigers' 598. Taylor scored the only touchdown of the night after an 8-play, 65-yard drive.

Taylor continued to start until an injury removed him from a 43–14 blowout of Duke. In a Thursday night match-up with Boston College, Glennon reclaimed his starting position. In a game plagued by rain storms and wet conditions, the Hokies took a 10–0 lead late into the fourth quarter. However, Eagles quarterback Matt Ryan spurred a late Boston College comeback, leading two TD drives in the final five minutes for a 14–10 win. Despite the devastating loss, Virginia Tech rebounded to win the remainder of its regular season games and claim the Coastal Division crown. A rematch with Boston College in the ACC Championship Game saw Tech fall behind early, tie the game by halftime, and then grind out a tense 30–16 win to advance to the Orange Bowl in Miami.

After 29 seasons as head coach of Virginia Tech, legendary coach Frank Beamer retired following the conclusion of the 2015 season. He coached the Hokies to 23 consecutive bowl games, including a national championship appearance, along with seven conference championship titles. Beamer signed an 8-year contract with Virginia Tech, serving as an ambassador for the Athletic Department.

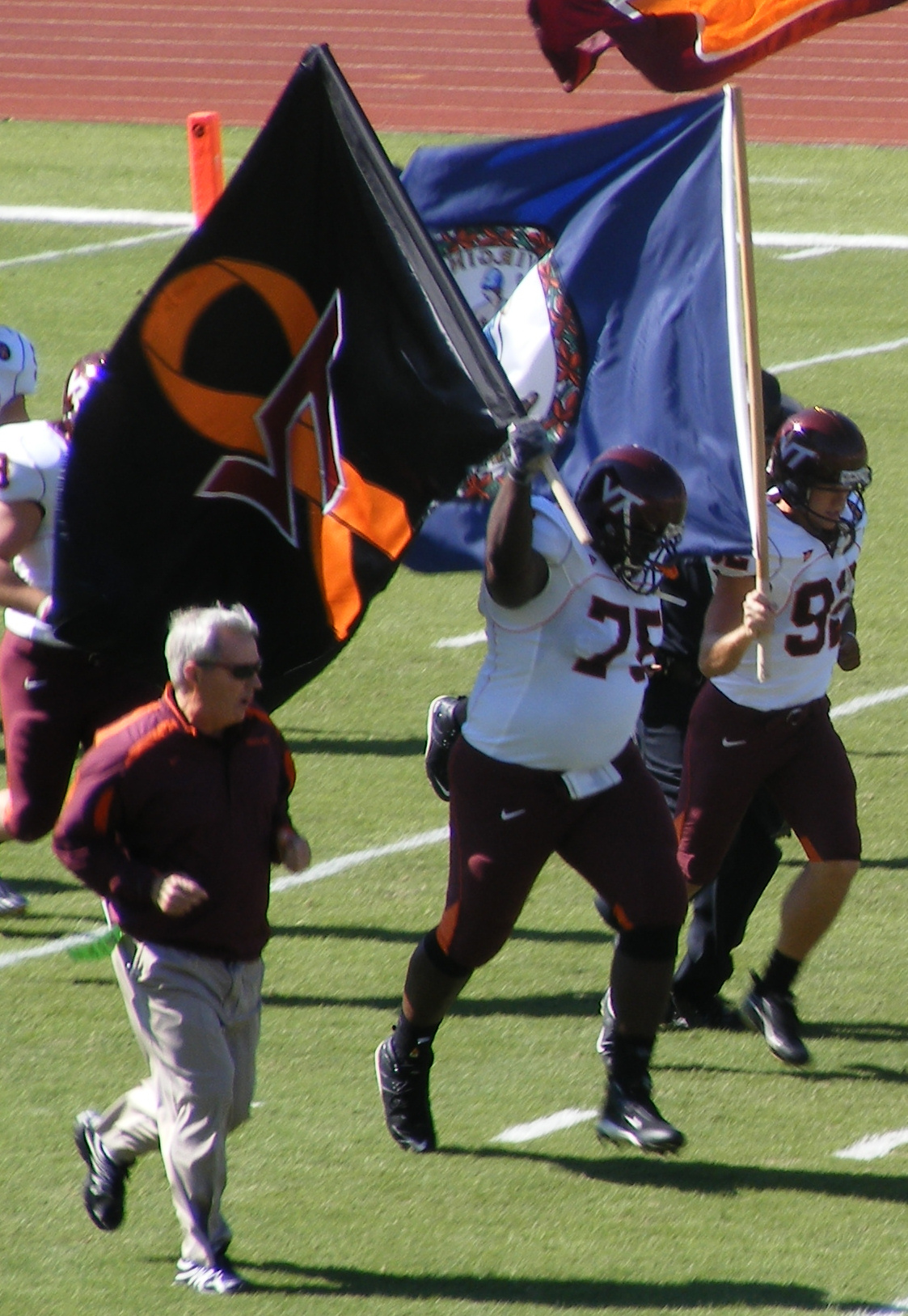
Beamer takes the field with the 2007 Virginia Tech Hokies football team

During Beamer's tenure at Virginia Tech, putting points on the scoreboard became a full team effort with the offensive, defensive and special teams units. Often when the team scores one or more non-offensive touchdowns, the style of play is described as "Beamerball". Since Beamer's first season in 1987, a player at every position on the defensive unit has scored at least one touchdown, and 35 different players have scored touchdowns on Virginia Tech's special teams.

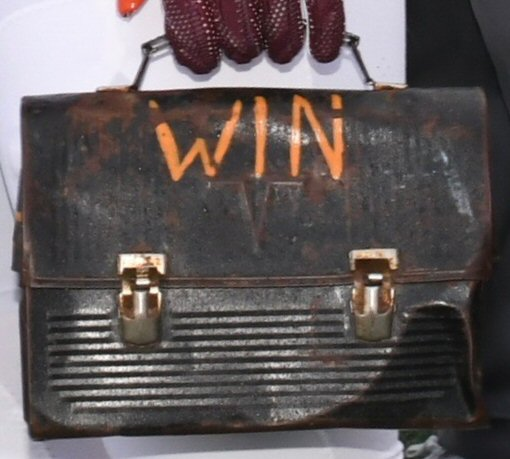
Virginia Tech lunch pail during the 2018 season

Sometime before the 1995 season, defensive coordinator Bud Foster wanted to give his defense something to rally around, an identity. A battered metal lunch pail was chosen as a symbol of a no-name, blue-collar defense. Each week a list of goals in put in the lunch pail and a player is chosen to have the honor of carrying the lunch pail onto the sidelines. The Lunch Pail Defense Foundation was founded to fund academic scholarships for students from the area near Blacksburg, Virginia.

=== Justin Fuente era (2016–2021) ===
On November 27, 2015, former Memphis head coach Justin Fuente was named the new head coach of the Virginia Tech Hokies. Fuente took over the team from the retiring coach Frank Beamer following the 2015 Independence Bowl game.

The Hokies finished Fuente's first year in 2016 with a regular season record of 9–3 and an overall record of 10–4. The Hokies became Coastal Division Champions for the 6th time and the first time since 2011. The Hokies played Clemson in the ACC Championship Game, losing 42–35. The team went to the 2016 Belk Bowl, in Charlotte, NC, defeating Arkansas, 35–24. Fuente was named the 2016 ACC Coach of the Year and he received many other accolades for the 2016 season.

In 2017, the Hokies went 5–3 in ACC play, finishing second to Miami in the Coastal division, with an overall record of 9–4. This result was good for a #22 ranking in the final 2017 CFB playoffs poll. Earning a bowl game bid, Virginia Tech eventually lost to the Oklahoma State Cowboys 30–21 in the 2017 Camping World Bowl.

The Hokies' performance slid under Fuente in their 2018 season. This time they finished fifth in the Coastal Division, posting a 4–4 conference standing and 6–7 overall record, losing their sole game against a ranked team. They then lost 35–31 to the Cincincati Bearcats in the 2018 Military Bowl.

Fuente steered Virginia Tech to better result in their 2019 campaign. The Hokies notched a 5–3 conference standing, ending up second to the Virginia Cavaliers in Coastal Conference play. In a dramatic game against the North Carolina Tarheels on October 19, 2019, the Hokies defeated their division rival 43–41 in 6 overtimes. They went 1–1 against ranked opponents, with an overall record of 8–5. Though the Hokies didn't have a final CFB playoff ranking, they did reprise their 2016 Belk Bowl appearance, this time facing the Kentucky Wildcats in the 2019 Belk Bowl, where they ended up losing 37–30.

The Hokies started the 2020 season ranked #24 in the preseason poll, ranking as high as #18 in by week four, then hovering around the top 20 until they eventually fell out of the poll after ranking #19 in week seven. Fuente guided the team to a middling result, tallying a 5–5 ACC record and 5–6 overall standing. Virginia Tech then ended its 27-year bowl game appearance record – the nation's longest streak at the time – opting to forgo postseason play. The challenges presented by the pandemic, combined with concerns over Fuente's performance, prompted the surprise announcement a day after a virtual press conference on Tuesday, December 15, 2020, called by Athletic Director Whit Babcock.

Virginia Tech kept Fuente at the helm as it began its 2021 season, producing a 4–4 ACC result and third-place finish in the Coastal Division, and a 6–7 overall record. Fuente was fired with two regular season games remaining on November 16, 2021, after compiling an overall record of 43–31 in six seasons. J. C. Price took over as interim coach to wrap-up the season. The Hokies then faced the Maryland Terrapins in the 2021 Pinstripe Bowl, losing 54–10.

=== Brent Pry era (2021–2025) ===
On November 30, 2021, the Hokies hired Penn State defensive coordinator and linebackers coach Brent Pry as the new head coach. In his first season, the Hokies had a 3–8 record, 1–6 in the ACC. In year two, Pry led the Hokies to their first winning season since 2019. Tech trounced UVA 55–17 in the regular season finale in Charlottesville, to earn a bowl bid. Then Tech beat Tulane 41–20 in the Military Bowl in Annapolis to finish 7–6.

=== James Franklin era (2025–present) ===
On November 17, 2025, former Penn State head coach James Franklin was named the new head coach of the Hokies.

== Conference affiliations ==
- Independent (1892–1897)
- Southern Intercollegiate Athletic Association (1898)
- Independent (1899–1911)
- South Atlantic Intercollegiate Athletic Association (1912–1921)
- Southern Conference (1922–1964)
- Independent (1965–1990)
- Big East (1991–2003)
- ACC (2004–present)

== Head coaches ==
Coach	Tenure
E. A. Smyth	1892–1893
Joseph Massie	1894
Arlie C. Jones	1895–1896
Charles Firth	1897
J. Lewis Ingles	1898
James Morrison	1899
Eugene Davis	1900
A. B. Morrison Jr.	1901
R. R. Brown	1902
Charles Augustus Lueder	1903
John C. O'Connor	1904
Sally Miles	1905–1906
Bob Williams	1907
R. M. Brown	1908
Branch Bocock	1909–1910
Lew Riess	1911
Branch Bocock	1912–1915
Jack E. Ingersoll	1916
Charles A. Bernier	1917–1919
Stanley Sutton	1920
B. C. Cubbage	1921–1925
Andy Gustafson	1926–1929
Orville Neale	1930–1931
Henry Redd	1932–1940
James Kitts	1941
Herbert McEver & Sumner D. Tilson	1942
No team	1943–1944
Herbert McEver	1945
James Kitts	1946–1947
Bob McNeish	1948–1950
Frank Moseley	1951–1960
Jerry Claiborne	1961–1970
Charlie Coffey	1971–1973
Jimmy Sharpe	1974–1977
Bill Dooley	1978–1986
Frank Beamer	1987–2015
Justin Fuente	2016–2021
J. C. Price (interim)	2021
Brent Pry	2022–2025
Philip Montgomery (interim)	2025
James Franklin	2026–present

== Championships ==
=== Conference championships ===
Virginia Tech claims 11 conference championships, nine outright and two shared.

Year	Conference	Coach	Overall record	Conference record
1909	SAIAA	Branch Bocock	6–1	
1916	SAIAA	Jack E. Ingersoll	7–2	4–0
1918	SAIAA	Charles A. Bernier	7–0	3–0
1963	Southern Conference	Jerry Claiborne	8–2	5–0
1995†	Big East Conference	Frank Beamer	10–2	6–1
1996†	Big East Conference	Frank Beamer	10–2	6–1
1999	Big East Conference	Frank Beamer	11–1	7–0
2004	Atlantic Coast Conference	Frank Beamer	10–3	7–1
2007	Atlantic Coast Conference	Frank Beamer	11–3	7–1
2008	Atlantic Coast Conference	Frank Beamer	10–4	5–3
2010	Atlantic Coast Conference	Frank Beamer	11–3	8–0

† Co-champions

=== Division championships ===
Virginia Tech won the ACC Championship in its inaugural season in the league in 2004. In 2005, the ACC Conference created two divisions, the Atlantic and Coastal, and a championship game between the divisions was established. Virginia Tech has appeared in the ACC Championship Game as the winner of the Coastal Division six times. Virginia Tech won the Coastal division in 2005 and played Florida State in the ACC Championship. Florida State won, 27–22. During the 2007 season, the Hokies once again took the Coastal division to set up a rematch of their earlier loss to Boston College. Virginia Tech prevailed 30–16. History repeated itself in 2008, when the Hokies defeated Boston College by a score of 30–12 after having lost to the Eagles during the regular season. In 2010 Virginia Tech went undefeated in league play, defeating Atlantic Division winner Florida State in the league championship game in Charlotte, North Carolina, 44–33. In 2011 Virginia Tech lost to Clemson for a 2nd time that season, their only two season losses. In 2016, Virginia Tech would fall short to Clemson, making a 3rd loss.

Year	Division championship	Coach	Opponent	ACC CG result
2005	ACC Coastal	Frank Beamer	Florida State	L 22–27
2007	ACC Coastal	Frank Beamer	Boston College	W 30–16
2008†	ACC Coastal	Frank Beamer	Boston College	W 30–12
2010	ACC Coastal	Frank Beamer	Florida State	W 44–33
2011	ACC Coastal	Frank Beamer	Clemson	L 10–38
2016	ACC Coastal	Justin Fuente	Clemson	L 35–42

† Co-champions

The ACC eliminated Divisions for the 2023 season. The two teams with the highest winning percentage against other ACC teams play for the conference championship.

== Bowl games ==
Virginia Tech has played in 36 bowl games. The Hokies have appeared in several Gator, Peach, Sugar, Belk, Military and Orange bowls. Their overall record in bowl games is 14–22 through the 2024 season.

No.	Season	Bowl game	Opponent	Result
1	1946	Sun	Cincinnati	L 6–18
2	1966	Liberty	Miami	L 7–14
3	1968	Liberty	Ole Miss	L 17–34
4	1980	Peach	Miami	L 17–34
5	1984	Independence	Air Force	L 7–23
6	1986	Peach	North Carolina State	W 25–24
7	1993	Independence	Indiana	W 45–20
8	1994	Gator	Tennessee	L 23–45
9	1995	Sugar	Texas	W 28–10
10	1996	Orange	Nebraska	L 21–41
11	1997	Gator	North Carolina	L 3–42
12	1998	Music City	Alabama	W 38–7
13	1999	Sugar (BCS NCG)	Florida State	L 29–46
14	2000	Gator	Clemson	W 41–20
15	2001	Gator	Florida State	L 17–30
16	2002	San Francisco	Air Force	W 20–13
17	2003	Insight	California	L 49–52
18	2004	Sugar	Auburn	L 13–16
19	2005	Gator	Louisville	W 35–24
20	2006	Peach	Georgia	L 24–31
21	2007	Orange	Kansas	L 21–24
22	2008	Orange	Cincinnati	W 20–7
23	2009	Peach	Tennessee	W 37–14
24	2010	Orange	Stanford	L 12–40
25	2011	Sugar	Michigan	L 20–23^{OT}
26	2012	Russell Athletic	Rutgers	W 13–10
27	2013	Sun	UCLA	L 12–42
28	2014	Military	Cincinnati	W 33–17
29	2015	Independence	Tulsa	W 55–52
30	2016	Belk	Arkansas	W 35–24
31	2017	Camping World	Oklahoma State	L 21–30
32	2018	Military	Cincinnati	L 31–35
33	2019	Belk	Kentucky	L 37–30
34	2021	Pinstripe	Maryland	L 10–54
35	2023	Military	Tulane	W 41–20
36	2024	Duke’s Mayo	Minnesota	L 10–24

== Rivalries ==
=== Virginia ===
Virginia Tech and Virginia first met in 1895 and have played annually since the year 1970. Since 1964, the game has always been played at either Lane Stadium or Scott Stadium on the campuses of the two universities. But the series has at times been played in Richmond (1903, 1904, and 1957); Norfolk (1940, 1941, and 1942); and Roanoke (in 17 of the 19 years between 1945 and 1963). At 105 games, it is the longest series for the Hokies and second-longest for the Cavaliers, after the 129-game series between Virginia and North Carolina known as the South's Oldest Rivalry. The game counts for 1 point in the Commonwealth Clash each year, and is part of the greater Virginia–Virginia Tech rivalry.

Virginia Tech leads in the Commonwealth Cup series 17–3 and the football series 62–38–5 as of 2024. Three times this game has determined the Coastal Division champions with VT winning in 2007 and 2011, and UVA winning in 2019.

=== West Virginia ===
The Hokies and West Virginia Mountaineers met 51 times between 1912 and 2005. The two teams played as conference foes from 1991 to 2003 as members of the Big East Conference (1979–2013). They met every year from 1973 to 2005. The Black Diamond Trophy is the trophy that goes to the winner of the game. It was introduced in 1997 and was meant to symbolize the Appalachian region's rich coal heritage (the phrase "black diamond" is often used as a term for coal.) Virginia Tech held the trophy in six of the nine years in which it was contested. The last two games played where on September 18, 2021, in Morgantown with West Virginia winning 27–21, and September 22, 2022, in Blacksburg with West Virginia winning 33–10. There are no further games scheduled in the series after the 2022 season.

West Virginia leads the series 30–23–1 as of 2022.

=== Miami ===
The Hurricanes and Hokies first met on November 13, 1953, in Miami. Miami and Virginia Tech have met in two bowl games, the 1966 Liberty Bowl and 1981 Peach Bowl. The two teams have played annually since 1992, and the rivalry developed when the Hokies became a member of the Big East Conference for football in 1991. When the Atlantic Coast Conference (ACC) expanded in 2004, both Miami and Virginia Tech became members of the ACC. Both teams continue to compete annually as part of the ACC's Coastal Division.

Miami leads the series 26–15 as of 2024. The last game between the two teams was September 27, 2024, in Blacksburg, and Miami won 38–34.

The two teams will next play November 22, 2025, at Miami's home stadium, Hard Rock Stadium in Miami Gardens.

=== Georgia Tech ===
One of the Hokies' younger rivals is Georgia Tech. Prior to the Hokies joining the ACC in 2004, Virginia Tech and Georgia Tech had only met once previously (an additional scheduled meeting was canceled due to extreme weather). Since the ACC adopted divisional format for football, one of these two teams had represented the ACC Coastal Division in every ACC Championship Game except the 2013 season when Duke won the Coastal and 2015 when UNC won it. Over the years, the rivalry has become a significant annual matchup in the ACC, specifically when both teams are in both regularly in the AP Top 25 and the race for the Coastal Division championship.

Virginia Tech leads the series 12–9 as of 2025, with Georgia Tech winning the past meeting.

=== Boston College ===
The Boston College-Virginia Tech football rivalry began in 1993 with a 48–34 Boston College win in Chestnut Hill when the two teams began Big East conference round-robin play. When the two schools moved to the Atlantic Coast Conference the rivalry continued as the two schools were chosen as permanent cross-divisional rivals. The teams played twice in both the 2007 and 2008 seasons, as both teams won their respective divisions of the ACC and played each other in the conference championship. Although the Eagles defeated the Hokies in both the regular seasons those two years, Virginia Tech won the 2007 and 2008 ACC Championship Game played between the two schools.

Virginia Tech leads the series 22–11 as of 2024, with Virginia Tech winning the past meeting.

=== VMI ===
Virginia Tech and VMI first met in 1894 and played annually from 1913 to 1971, usually in Roanoke on Thanksgiving Day. Like the current rivalry between VMI and The Citadel, the match-up was referred to as the Military Classic of the South, due to the military heritage of both schools. Starting again in 1973, the teams would continue to play on a yearly basis, making multiple appearances together in the Tobacco Bowl (1974, 1976) and Oyster Bowl (1980, 1982, 1984). The 1984 Oyster Bowl is the last time they played each other. However, in 2017, Virginia Tech and VMI agreed to a one-time rivalry matchup on September 5, 2026, at Lane Stadium. At 79 games, it is the second-longest series for the Hokies and fourth-longest for the Keydets. Due to the long pause of the VMI-VPI series, the Virginia–Virginia Tech rivalry has emerged as the dominant one in the state. Virginia Tech leads the series 49–25–5 as of 2019, with Virginia Tech winning the past six meetings.

== Individual award winners ==
=== Players ===
Sammy Baugh Trophy (quarterback)

- Don Strock – 1972

Bronko Nagurski Trophy (defense)

- Corey Moore – 1999

Dave Rimington Trophy (center)

- Jake Grove – 2003

Lombardi Award (lineman or linebacker)

- Corey Moore – 1999

Outland Trophy (interior lineman)

- Bruce Smith – 1984

=== Coaches ===
Paul "Bear" Bryant Award

- Frank Beamer – 1999

George Munger Award

- Frank Beamer – 1999

Joseph V. Paterno Award

- Frank Beamer – 2010

Broyles Award (assistant coaches)

- Bud Foster – 2006

Bobby Dodd Coach of the Year Award

- Frank Beamer 1999

== Retired numbers ==
In 2002, the Virginia Tech athletics department developed a new policy on retiring jerseys. This special honor is bestowed to acknowledge an individual who has won an established national award in their sport. The Hokies has retired five numbers.

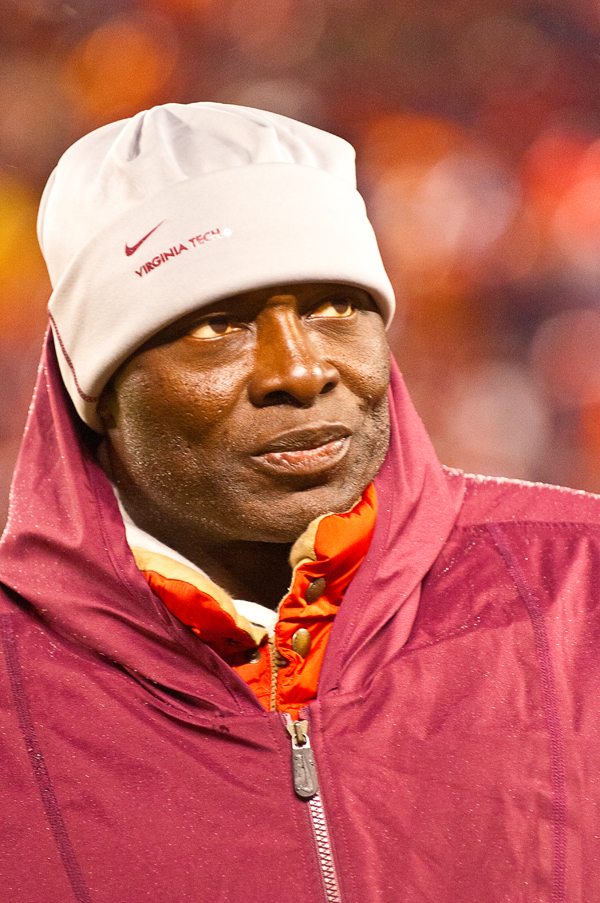
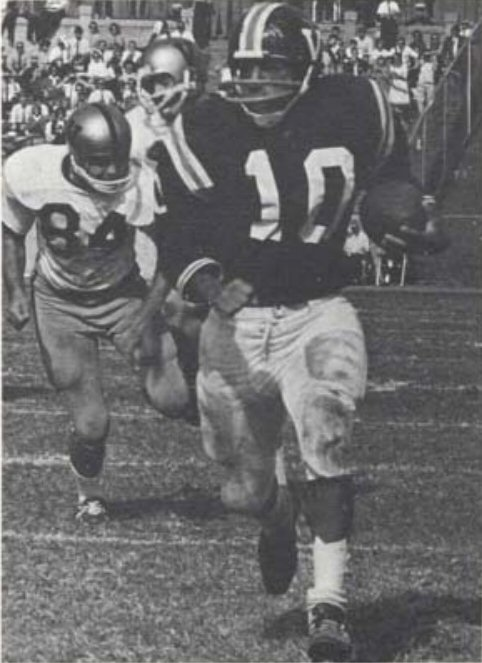
Bruce Smith (left) and Frank Loria, two of the players who have their numbers retired by Virginia Tech.

Virginia Tech Hokies retired numbers
No.	Player	Pos.	Tenure	No. ret.
10	Frank Loria	S	1965–1967	
25	Frank Beamer	CB	1966–1968	September 12, 2002
73	Jim Pyne	C	1990–1993	January 27, 1994
78	Bruce Smith	DT	1981–1984	
84	Carroll Dale	E	1956–1959	

=== Retired jerseys ===
Additionally, Virginia Tech has four retired jerseys. These numbers can be worn normally by any player.

Virginia Tech Hokies retired jerseys
No.	Player	Pos.	Tenure	No. ret.
7	Michael Vick	QB	1998–2000	September 1, 2002
56	Corey Moore	DE	1997–1999	October 23, 2010
58	Cornell Brown	LB	1993–1996	November 20, 2002
64	Jake Grove	C	2000–2003	September 23, 2006

== Future opponents ==
For the 2023 season, the ACC implemented a 3–5–5 scheduling system, with Pittsburgh, Virginia, and Wake Forest serving as the three teams played every year in a home-and-home basis. On September 1, 2023, the ACC voted to add University of California, Berkeley, Southern Methodist University, and Stanford University to the conference starting in the 2024–25 school year, which made the 3–5–5 schedule obsolete. Due to the expansion in 2024, the ACC is now scheduling games without a specific algorithm, and the conference released a schedule for 2024–2030 in October 2023.

Additionally, each season every ACC team schedules four non-conference games, including at least one against a "Power 5" team (which can include other ACC teams or FBS independent Notre Dame).

On September 22, 2025, the ACC announced that it was moving to a nine-game conference schedule beginning in 2026. On December 16, 2025, league opponents were announced for 2026, in which 12 teams would play a nine-game schedule, and the other 5 teams would play an eight-game schedule. Virginia Tech will be playing a nine-game conference schedule. There is also a minimum of 10 games each year against Power Four opponents.

Announced opponents as of August 28, 2026.

Year	Non-conference opponents			ACC Opponents								
2026	VMI (9/5)	Old Dominion (9/12)	at Maryland (9/19)	at Boston College (9/26)	Pittsburgh (Fri, 10/2)	at California (10/10)	Georgia Tech (10/17)	at Clemson (10/24)	at SMU (11/6 or 11/7)	Stanford (11/14)	at Miami (11/21)	Virginia (11/28)
2027	The Citadel (8/28)	Liberty (9/4)	at Notre Dame (11/6)	Clemson	Wake Forest	NC State	Syracuse	Miami	at Louisville	at UNC	at Ga. Tech	at Virginia
2028	Gardner–Webb (8/26)	Liberty (9/2)	Notre Dame (11/4)									Virginia
2029	at Arizona (9/8)	Maryland (9/15)										at Virginia
2030	Arizona (8/30)	at BYU (9/14)	Old Dominion (9/21)									Virginia
2031	vs Wisconsin^{1} (8/30)	North Alabama (9/6)										at Virginia
2032	Ole Miss (9/4)	at Wisconsin (9/18)										Virginia
2033	BYU (9/10)	at Notre Dame (11/5)										at Virginia
2034	Alabama (9/2)											Virginia
2035	at Alabama (9/1)											at Virginia
2036	Notre Dame (9/1)											Virginia
2037	at Ole Miss (9/5)											at Virginia

1. The 2031 game with Wisconsin will be played at Bank of America Stadium in Charlotte, NC.
