= 1916 George Washington Hatchetites football team =

American college football season

1916 George Washington Hatchetites football
- Conference: South Atlantic Intercollegiate Athletic Association
- Record: 3–3–1 (2–1 SAIAA)
- Head coach: Thomas Sullivan (1st season)
- Home stadium: Union League Park

1916 South Atlantic Intercollegiate Athletic Association football standings
	Conf.					Overall
Team	W		L		T	W		L		T
VPI $	4	–	0	–	0	7	–	2	–	0
Georgetown	2	–	0	–	0	8	–	1	–	0
Washington and Lee	1	–	0	–	0	5	–	2	–	2
George Washington	2	–	1	–	0	3	–	3	–	1
North Carolina	2	–	1	–	0	5	–	4	–	0
Catholic University	2	–	1	–	0	4	–	4	–	0
Virginia	2	–	1	–	0	4	–	5	–	0
Davidson	1	–	2	–	0	5	–	3	–	1
Richmond	1	–	3	–	1	5	–	4	–	2
VMI	1	–	4	–	0	4	–	5	–	0
St. John's (MD)	0	–	1	–	0	0	–	1	–	0
William & Mary	0	–	2	–	1	2	–	5	–	2
Johns Hopkins	0	–	2	–	0	0	–	2	–	0
North Carolina A&M	0	–	4	–	0	2	–	5	–	0
$ – Conference champion

The 1916 George Washington Hatchetites Colonials football team was an American football team that represented George Washington University as a member of the South Atlantic Intercollegiate Athletic Association (SAIAA) during the 1916 college football season. In their first season under head coach Thomas Sullivan, the team compiled a 3–3–1 record.

== Schedule ==
Date	Time	Opponent	Site	Result	Attendance	Source
October 7		at St. John's (MD)	Worden Field; Annapolis, MD	W 6–0		
October 14		at Gettysburg*	Dixon Field; Gettysburg, PA	L 0–20		
October 21		Western Maryland*	Union League Park; Washington, DC	L 0–3		
October 28		at Johns Hopkins	Homewood Field; Baltimore, MD	W 13–0		
November 4		Ursinus*	Georgetown Field; Washington, DC	T 0–0		
November 11	3:00 p.m.	Eastern College (VA)*	Union League Park; Washington, DC	W 21–0		
November 30		vs. Georgetown	National Park; Washington, DC	L 7–47	5,000	
*Non-conference game; All times are in Eastern time
