= Thomas Sullivan =

Thomas, Tom, or Tommy Sullivan may refer to:

== Entertainment ==
- Thomas Russell Sullivan (1849–1916), American writer
- Thomas Sullivan (author), American author of short stories and novels
- Thomas E. Sullivan, an actor known for Marvel's Agents of S.H.I.E.L.D.
- Thomas M. Sullivan (born c. 1949), American radio talk show host and television show host
- Thomas Michael Sullivan, actor, producer, and founding member of Stage 13
- Tom Sullivan (radio and television personality), Atlanta radio and television personality
- Tom Sullivan (singer) (born 1947), blind singer, actor, author
- Tommy Sullivan, singer and saxophonist for Johnny Maestro & the Brooklyn Bridge
- Tom Sullivan (special effects artist), American effects artist, makeup artist, and actor

== Politics ==
- Thomas A. Sullivan (1855–1946), American politician
- Thomas L. Sullivan (1846–1936), mayor of Indianapolis, Indiana
- Thomas J. Sullivan (1845–1908), director of the U.S. Bureau of Engraving and Printing
- Tom Sullivan (Idaho politician) (born 1968), Idaho Senate candidate
- Tom Sullivan (Colorado politician) (born 1956), American politician and member of the Colorado House of Representatives
- Thomas F. Sullivan (1878–1957), American government official

== Sports ==
- Tom Sullivan (1880s pitcher) (1860–1947), American baseball player
- Tom Sullivan (1920s pitcher) (1895–1962), American baseball player
- Tom Sullivan (catcher) (1906–1944), American baseball player
- Tom Sullivan (American football) (1950–2002), American football running back
- Thomas Sullivan (American football) (1892–1958), American college football player and coach
- Tom Sullivan (basketball) (born 1950), college basketball coach
- Tom Sullivan (boxer) (1922–1959), killed by mob
- Tom Sullivan (rower) (1868–1949), New Zealand oarsman
- Tommy Sullivan (curler) (born 1977), Canadian curler

== Other ==
- Thomas Crook Sullivan (1833–1908), American general
- Thomas Sullivan (Medal of Honor, 1869) (1846/1847–?), for service with the 1st Cavalry in the Chiricahua Mountains
- Thomas Sullivan (Medal of Honor, 1890) (1859–1940), for service at the Battle of Wounded Knee
- Thomas P. Sullivan (1929/1930–2021), American attorney

== See also ==
- Thomas O'Sullivan (disambiguation)
