= 1916 Virginia Orange and Blue football team =

American college football season

1916 Virginia Orange and Blue football
- Conference: South Atlantic Intercollegiate Athletic Association
- Record: 4–5 (2–1 SAIAA)
- Head coach: Peyton Evans (1st season)
- Home stadium: Lambeth Field

1916 South Atlantic Intercollegiate Athletic Association football standings
	Conf.					Overall
Team	W		L		T	W		L		T
VPI $	4	–	0	–	0	7	–	2	–	0
Georgetown	2	–	0	–	0	8	–	1	–	0
Washington and Lee	1	–	0	–	0	5	–	2	–	2
George Washington	2	–	1	–	0	3	–	3	–	1
North Carolina	2	–	1	–	0	5	–	4	–	0
Catholic University	2	–	1	–	0	4	–	4	–	0
Virginia	2	–	1	–	0	4	–	5	–	0
Davidson	1	–	2	–	0	5	–	3	–	1
Richmond	1	–	3	–	1	5	–	4	–	2
VMI	1	–	4	–	0	4	–	5	–	0
St. John's (MD)	0	–	1	–	0	0	–	1	–	0
William & Mary	0	–	2	–	1	2	–	5	–	2
Johns Hopkins	0	–	2	–	0	0	–	2	–	0
North Carolina A&M	0	–	4	–	0	2	–	5	–	0
$ – Conference champion

The 1916 Virginia Orange and Blue football team represented the University of Virginia as a member of the South Atlantic Intercollegiate Athletic Association (SAIAA) during the 1916 college football season. Led by Peyton Evans in his first and only season as head coach, the Orange and Blue compiled an overall record of 4–5 with a mark of 2–1 in conference play, tying for fifth place in the SAIAA.

== Schedule ==
Date	Time	Opponent	Site	Result	Source
September 30		Davidson	Lambeth Field; Charlottesville, VA	W 14–0	
October 7		at Yale*	Yale Bowl; New Haven, CT	L 3–61	
October 14		Richmond	Lambeth Field; Charlottesville, VA	W 21–0	
October 21		Georgia*	Lambeth Field; Charlottesville, VA	L 7–13	
October 28		at Vanderbilt*	Dudley Field; Nashville, TN	L 6–27	
November 4		Harvard*	Harvard Stadium; Boston, MA	L 0–51	
November 11		South Carolina*	Lambeth Field; Charlottesville, VA	W 35–6	
November 18		VMI	Lambeth Field; Charlottesville, VA	W 20–7	
November 30	2:30 p.m.	vs. North Carolina	Broad Street Park; Richmond, VA (rivalry)	L 0–7	
*Non-conference game
