= Jack E. Ingersoll =

American football player and coach (1889–1967)

Biographical details
- Born: February 24, 1889; Cleveland, Ohio, U.S.
- Died: May 26, 1967 (aged 78); Youngstown, Ohio, U.S.

Playing career
- 1907–1910: Dartmouth
- Position: Quarterback

Coaching career (HC unless noted)
- 1911: Colgate
- 1916: VPI

Head coaching record
- Overall: 10–8

Accomplishments and honors

Championships
- 1 SAIAA (1916)

Jonathan Edwards "Jack" Ingersoll (February 24, 1889 – May 26, 1967) was an American college football player and coach. He served as the head coach at Colgate University in 1911 and at Virginia Agricultural and Mechanical College and Polytechnic Institute (VPI)—now known as Virginia Tech—in 1916, compiling a career coaching record of 10–8.

== Head coaching record ==
Year	Team	Overall	Conference	Standing	Bowl/playoffs
Colgate (Independent) (1911)
1911	Colgate	3–5			
Colgate:		3–5			
VPI Gobblers (South Atlantic Intercollegiate Athletic Association) (1916)
1916	VPI	7–2	4–0	1st	
VPI:		7–2	4–0		
Total:		10–8			
National championship Conference title Conference division title or championship game berth
