= 1916 North Carolina Tar Heels football team =

American college football season

1916 North Carolina Tar Heels football
- Conference: South Atlantic Intercollegiate Athletic Association
- Record: 5–4 (2–1 SAIAA)
- Head coach: Thomas J. Campbell (1st season)
- Captain: George Tandy
- Home stadium: Emerson Field

1916 South Atlantic Intercollegiate Athletic Association football standings
| | Conf. | | | | | Overall |
| Team | W | | L | | T | W | | L | | T |
|---|---|---|---|---|---|---|---|---|---|---|
| VPI $ | 4 | – | 0 | – | 0 | 7 | – | 2 | – | 0 |
| Georgetown | 2 | – | 0 | – | 0 | 8 | – | 1 | – | 0 |
| Washington and Lee | 1 | – | 0 | – | 0 | 5 | – | 2 | – | 2 |
| George Washington | 2 | – | 1 | – | 0 | 3 | – | 3 | – | 1 |
| North Carolina | 2 | – | 1 | – | 0 | 5 | – | 4 | – | 0 |
| Catholic University | 2 | – | 1 | – | 0 | 4 | – | 4 | – | 0 |
| Virginia | 2 | – | 1 | – | 0 | 4 | – | 5 | – | 0 |
| Davidson | 1 | – | 2 | – | 0 | 5 | – | 3 | – | 1 |
| Richmond | 1 | – | 3 | – | 1 | 5 | – | 4 | – | 2 |
| VMI | 1 | – | 4 | – | 0 | 4 | – | 5 | – | 0 |
| St. John's (MD) | 0 | – | 1 | – | 0 | 0 | – | 1 | – | 0 |
| William & Mary | 0 | – | 2 | – | 1 | 2 | – | 5 | – | 2 |
| Johns Hopkins | 0 | – | 2 | – | 0 | 0 | – | 2 | – | 0 |
| North Carolina A&M | 0 | – | 4 | – | 0 | 2 | – | 5 | – | 0 |
$ – Conference champion

The 1916 North Carolina Tar Heels football team represented the University of North Carolina in the 1916 college football season. The team captain of the 1916 season was George Tandy.

The 1916 season was the first year UNC played at Emerson Field, named after its benefactor Isaac Emerson and built on the site of the pre-existing athletic field.

== Schedule ==
| Date | Time | Opponent | Site | Result | Attendance | Source |
|---|---|---|---|---|---|---|
| September 30 | 3:00 p.m. | Wake Forest* | Emerson Field; Chapel Hill, NC (rivalry) | W 20–0 | 2,500 | |
| October 7 | 3:00 p.m. | at Princeton* | Palmer Stadium; Princeton, NJ | L 0–29 | | |
| October 14 | | at Harvard* | Harvard Stadium; Boston, MA | L 0–21 | | |
| October 21 | 2:30 p.m. | at Georgia Tech* | Grant Field; Atlanta, GA | L 6–10 | | |
| October 28 | 3:00 p.m. | VMI | Emerson Field; Chapel Hill, NC | W 38–13 | | |
| November 4 | | vs. VPI | Fair Grounds (Roanoke); Roanoke, VA | L 7–14 | | |
| November 11 | 2:30 p.m. | vs. Davidson | Prince Albert Park; Winston-Salem, NC | W 10–6 | | |
| November 18 | 3:00 p.m. | Furman* | Emerson Field; Chapel Hill, NC | W 46–0 | | |
| November 30 | 2:30 p.m. | vs. Virginia | Broad Street Park (II); Richmond, VA (rivalry) | W 7–0 | 14,000 | |
*Non-conference game
