= Samuel H. Hubbard =

American football and basketball coach

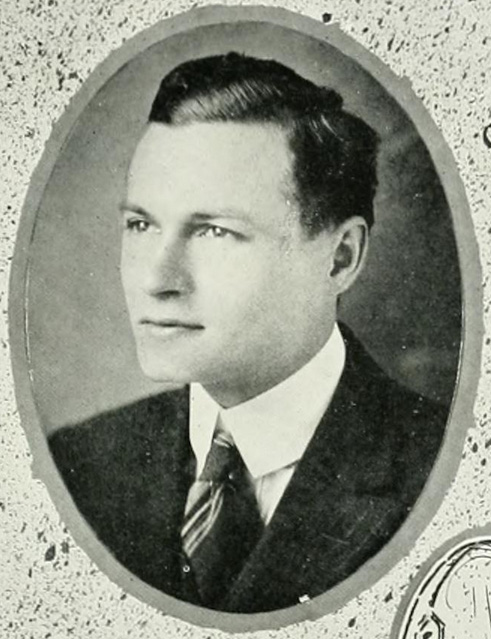
- Hubbard pictured in The Colonial Echo 1917, William & Mary yearbook

Coaching career (HC unless noted)

Football
- 1916: William & Mary

Basketball
- 1916–1917: William & Mary

Baseball
- 1917: William & Mary

Administrative career (AD unless noted)
- 1916–1918: William & Mary

Head coaching record
- Overall: 2–5–2 (football); 4–9 (basketball)

Samuel Hildreth Hubbard, Jr. was the head coach for the William & Mary Tribe men's basketball team for the 1916–1917 season. He produced a 4–9 record during that time. Hubbard was also the head football coach for the 1916 season, going 2–5–2.

== Head coaching record ==
=== Football ===
Year	Team	Overall	Conference	Standing	Bowl/playoffs
William & Mary Orange and Black (Eastern Virginia Intercollegiate Athletic Association / South Atlantic Intercollegiate Athletic Association) (1916)
1916	William & Mary	2–5–2	1–4–1 / 0–2–1	T–3rd – 13th	
William & Mary:		2–5–2	1–5–1		
Total:		2–5–2			

=== Basketball ===
Record table
Season	Team	Overall	Conference	Standing	Postseason
William & Mary Indians (Independent) (1916–1917)
1916–17	William & Mary	4–9			
William & Mary:		4–9			
Total:		4–9			
