= 1916 Richmond Spiders football team =

American college football season

1916 Richmond Spiders football

EVIAA co-champion
- Conference: Eastern Virginia Intercollegiate Athletic Association, South Atlantic Intercollegiate Athletic Association
- Record: 5–4–2 (4–1–2 EVIAA, 1–3–1 SAIAA)
- Head coach: Frank Dobson (4th season)
- Captain: Bertram Lee Robins
- Home stadium: Broad Street Park

1916 Eastern Virginia Intercollegiate Athletic Association football standings
	Conf.					Overall
Team	W		L		T	W		L		T
Richmond +	4	–	1	–	2	5	–	2	–	2
Hampden–Sydney +	4	–	1	–	2	6	–	3	–	2
Randolph–Macon	1	–	4	–	1	1	–	7	–	1
William & Mary	1	–	4	–	1	2	–	5	–	2
+ – Conference co-champions

1916 South Atlantic Intercollegiate Athletic Association football standings
	Conf.					Overall
Team	W		L		T	W		L		T
VPI $	4	–	0	–	0	7	–	2	–	0
Georgetown	2	–	0	–	0	8	–	1	–	0
Washington and Lee	1	–	0	–	0	5	–	2	–	2
George Washington	2	–	1	–	0	3	–	3	–	1
North Carolina	2	–	1	–	0	5	–	4	–	0
Catholic University	2	–	1	–	0	4	–	4	–	0
Virginia	2	–	1	–	0	4	–	5	–	0
Davidson	1	–	2	–	0	5	–	3	–	1
Richmond	1	–	3	–	1	5	–	4	–	2
VMI	1	–	4	–	0	4	–	5	–	0
St. John's (MD)	0	–	1	–	0	0	–	1	–	0
William & Mary	0	–	2	–	1	2	–	5	–	2
Johns Hopkins	0	–	2	–	0	0	–	2	–	0
North Carolina A&M	0	–	4	–	0	2	–	5	–	0
$ – Conference champion

The 1916 Richmond Spiders football team was an American football team that represented Richmond College—now known as the University of Richmond—as a member of the Eastern Virginia Intercollegiate Athletic Association (EVIAA) and the South Atlantic Intercollegiate Athletic Association (SAIAA) during the 1916 college football season. Led by fourth-year head coach Frank Dobson, Richmond finished the season 5–4–2 overall, 4–1–2 in EVIAA play, and 1–3–1 against SAIAA opponents. The Spiders tied with Hampden–Sydney for the EVIAA title.

== Schedule ==
Date	Time	Opponent	Site	Result	Source
September 30		at VPI	Miles Field; Blacksburg, VA	L 0–13	
October 7		at Catholic University	Washington, DC	L 6–34	
October 11	3:00 p.m.	Richmond Blues*	Broad Street Park; Richmond, VA	W 12–0	
October 14		at Virginia	Lambeth Field; Charlottesville, VA	L 0–21	
October 21		Hampden–Sydney	Richmond, VA	W 13–2	
October 28		William & Mary	Richmond, VA (rivalry)	W 48–0	
November 4		Randolph–Macon	Richmond, VA	W 32–13	
November 11		at Hampden–Sydney	Hampden Sydney, VA	L 0–8	
November 18		at William & Mary	Williamsburg, VA	T 0–0	
December 2		Randolph–Macon	Richmond, VA	W 19–0	
December 9		Hampden–Sydney	Richmond, VA	T 0–0	
*Non-conference game
