= Britain Patterson =

American football player and coach (1888–1936)

Britain Paterson
Biographical details
- Died: 1936; Pasadena, California, U.S.

Playing career
- 1913–1914: Washington & Jefferson
- Position: Tackle

Coaching career (HC unless noted)
- 1916: NC State
- c. 1921: Detroit (line)
- 1924: Waynesburg
- 1927: Manhattan

Head coaching record
- Overall: 13–9–2

Accomplishments and honors

Awards
- Second-team All-American (1914)

Britain Paterson (1888–1936), sometimes spelled Brit Patterson and Britton Patterson, was an American football player and coach. He played college football at Washington & Jefferson College in Washington, Pennsylvania. Patterson served as the head football coach at North Carolina College of Agriculture and Mechanic Arts—now North Carolina State University—in 1916, Waynesburg College—now known as Waynesburg University—in Waynesburg, Pennsylvania in 1924, and Manhattan College in 1927.

== Playing career ==
Paterson played college football at the tackle position for the Washington & Jefferson Presidents in 1913 and 1914. He was selected as a first-team member of the 1914 College Football All-America Team by the Philadelphia Evening Bulletin; the Pittsburgh Sun (as selected by sporting editor James J. Long); the Philadelphia Evening Telegraph, (as selected by sporting editor Louis M. Toughill); the Philadelphia Public Ledger (as selected by Robert W. Maxwell); the Boston Post (as selected by Charles H. Parker), and Tom Thorp in the New York Evening Journal.

The 1914 Washington & Jefferson team compiled a 10–0–1 record, defeated Yale, and fell one point short of a national championship after losing to Harvard by a score of 10–9. Paterson was a bulwark of the team's line, and his ejection from the Harvard game in 1914 was credited with allowing Harvard to overcome an early deficit and win the game. One newspaper noted:

"Had Paterson remained in the game Harvard never would have been able to make those great gains through tackle -- and Harvard never would have won . . . Patterson's football record is clean. He never before was chased from a game for roughness. No man that ever played against him justly can accuse him of 'dirty' playing. Paterson always played the game to the fullest limit of his great power. He opened holes when he was called upon to do it, and he held back his enemies when such action was necessary. But he always did it fairly, honorably, and in keeping with the rules of the game. And so Patterson's action, even though it lost the game for W. & J., even though it robbed W. & J. of a wonderful honor, is an excusable action and one which should not reflect upon his football record, which has been as bright and as clean as that of any man who ever played the game."

Paterson sustained an injury to his knee cap during a game against Georgetown during the 1914 season. In February 1915, a newspaper account reported that he had been "crippled probably for life" as a result of the injury, was required to walk with a crutch and had dropped from 225 to 175 pounds.

== Coaching career ==
Paterson served as the head football coach at North Carolina College of Agriculture and Mechanic Arts—now known as North Carolina State University—in 1916, at Waynesburg University in 1924, and at Manhattan College in 1927.

== Later life and death ==
Paterson moved to the Western United States and was injured at Boulder Dam. While recovering from those injuries in 1936, he was stricken with acute appendicitis and died during an operation in Pasadena, California. He was married to the former Ethel Wallington Butler and was father to eight children in Pearl River, Orangetown, NY. https://www.newspapers.com/image/162556556/?terms=Britain%20Paterson&match=1

== Head coaching record ==
Year	Team	Overall	Conference	Standing	Bowl/playoffs
North Carolina A&M Aggies (South Atlantic Intercollegiate Athletic Association) (1916)
1916	North Carolina A&M	2–5	0–4	14th	
North Carolina A&M:		2–5	0–4		
Waynesburg Yellow Jackets (Independent) (1924)
1924	Waynesburg	7–2–1			
Waynesburg:		7–2–1			
Manhattan (Independent) (1927)
1927	Manhattan	4–2–1			
Manhattan:		4–2–1			
Total:		13–9–2			
