= 1916 VPI Gobblers football team =

American college football season

1916 VPI Gobblers football

SAIAA champion
- Conference: South Atlantic Intercollegiate Athletic Association
- Record: 7–2 (4–0 SAIAA)
- Head coach: Jack E. Ingersoll (1st season)
- Captain: John Staub Caffee
- Home stadium: Miles Field

1916 South Atlantic Intercollegiate Athletic Association football standings
	Conf.					Overall
Team	W		L		T	W		L		T
VPI $	4	–	0	–	0	7	–	2	–	0
Georgetown	2	–	0	–	0	8	–	1	–	0
Washington and Lee	1	–	0	–	0	5	–	2	–	2
George Washington	2	–	1	–	0	3	–	3	–	1
North Carolina	2	–	1	–	0	5	–	4	–	0
Catholic University	2	–	1	–	0	4	–	4	–	0
Virginia	2	–	1	–	0	4	–	5	–	0
Davidson	1	–	2	–	0	5	–	3	–	1
Richmond	1	–	3	–	1	5	–	4	–	2
VMI	1	–	4	–	0	4	–	5	–	0
St. John's (MD)	0	–	1	–	0	0	–	1	–	0
William & Mary	0	–	2	–	1	2	–	5	–	2
Johns Hopkins	0	–	2	–	0	0	–	2	–	0
North Carolina A&M	0	–	4	–	0	2	–	5	–	0
$ – Conference champion

The 1916 VPI Gobblers football team represented the Virginia Agricultural and Mechanical College and Polytechnic Institute in the 1916 college football season. Led by Jack E. Ingersoll in his only year as head coach, the team went 7–2 and claims a South Atlantic Intercollegiate Athletic Association (SAIAA) championship.

== Schedule ==
Date	Time	Opponent	Site	Result	Attendance	Source
September 30		Richmond	Miles Field; Blacksburg, VA	W 13–0		
October 7		Hampden–Sydney*	Miles Field; Blacksburg, VA	W 10–0		
October 14		vs. West Virginia*	Kanawha Park; Charleston, WV (rivalry)	L 0–20		
October 20	2:30 p.m.	at Yale*	Yale Field; New Haven, CT	L 0–19	5,000	
October 28	2:30 p.m.	vs. North Carolina A&M	League Park; Norfolk, VA	W 40–0	3,000	
November 4	3:00 p.m.	vs. North Carolina	Fair Grounds; Roanoke, VA	W 14–7		
November 11		Wake Forest*	Miles Field; Blacksburg, VA	W 52–0		
November 18		Roanoke*	Miles Field; Blacksburg, VA	W 41–0		
November 30	2:30 p.m.	vs. VMI	Fair Grounds; Roanoke, VA (rivalry)	W 23–14	5,000	
*Non-conference game

== Before the season ==
The 1915 VPI Gobblers football team compiled a 4–4 record and were led by Branch Bocock in his sixth season as head coach.

== Game summaries ==
=== Richmond ===
Richmond vs. VPI

Team	1	2	3	4	Total
Richmond	0	0	0	0	0
• VPI	7	0	6	0	13

- Date: September 30, 1916
- Location: Miles Field
  Blacksburg, VA
- Referee: Branch Bocock

VPI's first game of the season was a victory over Richmond at Miles Field.

The starting lineup for VPI was: Nelson (left end), Parrish (left tackle), Howell (left guard), A. B. Moore (center), A. P. Moore (right guard), Caffee (right tackle), Younger (right end), Lancaster (quarterback), Gaines (left halfback), Mack (right halfback), Redd (fullback). The substitutes were: Engleby, Funkhouser, Gregory, Hall, McNeil, D. Roden, E. Roden, Somerville, Stringer and Treakle.

The starting lineup for Richmond was: Willey Broaddus (left end), Harry Carter (left tackle), Robinson (left guard), Ashby Henderson (center), Ollie Oakes (right guard), Bertram Robins (right tackle), Robert Whittet (right end), Caldwell Wicker (quarterback), Howard Spencer (left halfback), Goodwyn Kuyk (right halfback), Thomas Miller (fullback). The substitutes were: Harvey Milbourne, Clyde Shepherd and Thomas Taliaferro.

=== Hampden–Sydney ===
Hampden–Sydney vs. VPI

Team	1	2	3	4	Total
HS	0	0	0	0	0
• VPI	0	7	0	3	10

- Date: October 7, 1916
- Location: Miles Field
  Blacksburg, VA
- Referee: Branch Bocock

After their victory over Richmond, VPI played Hampden–Sydney College at Miles Field.

The starting lineup for VPI was: Gregory (left end), Hall (left tackle), Howell (left guard), A. B. Moore (center), A. P. Moore (right guard), Caffee (right tackle), Nelson (right end), Lancaster (quarterback), Stringer (left halfback), Mack (right halfback), Redd (fullback). The substitutes were: E. Roden, Somerville and Younger.

The starting lineup for Hampden–Sydney was: Walter Aylor (left end), R. F. Porter (left tackle), J. W. Hogshead (left guard), Royster Lyle (center), Henry Allen (right guard), Ernest Herzig (right tackle), Robert Gillespie (right end), Walter Thurman (quarterback), Thomas Parrish (left halfback), Peyton Palmore (right halfback), James Warren (fullback).

=== West Virginia ===
VPI vs. West Virginia

Team	1	2	3	4	Total
VPI	0	0	0	0	0
• WVU	6	0	0	14	20

- Date: October 14, 1916
- Location: Charleston, WV
- Referee: Tiny Maxwell

The starting lineup for VPI was: Younger (left end), Hall (left tackle), Howell (left guard), A. P. Moore (center), A. B. Moore (right guard), Caffee (right tackle), Nelson (right end), Funkhouser (quarterback), Gaines (left halfback), Stringer (right halfback), Redd (fullback). The substitutes were: Gregory, McNeil, Parrish, E. Roden and Treakle.

The starting lineup for West Virginia was: Harold Hutchinson (left end), Harry Curry (left tackle), Howard Henrie (left guard), Russ Bailey (center), Dorsey Brannan (right guard), J. Burns Webster (right tackle), Paul Hager (right end), Fred Chenoweth (quarterback), Rip King (left halfback), Clay Hite (right halfback), Ira Rodgers (fullback). The substitutes were: Lane Anderson, James Shughrou and Rowley Thornburg.

=== Yale ===
VPI at Yale

Team	1	2	3	4	Total
VPI	0	0	0	0	0
• Yale	12	0	7	0	19

- Date: October 20, 1916
- Location: Yale Field
  New Haven, CT
- Game start: 2:30 p.m.
- Game attendance: 5,000
- Game weather: "drizzle and heavy fog"
- Referee: Whiting (Cornell)

Former President and future Chief Justice William Howard Taft attended the Yale-VPI game to watch his son Charles play in the game.

The starting lineup for VPI was: Gregory (left end), Hall (left tackle), Parrish (left guard), A. P. Moore (center), A. B. Moore (right guard), Caffee (right tackle), Younger (right end), E. Roden (quarterback), Mack (left halfback), Nelson (right halfback), Gardner (fullback). The substitutes were: Funkhouser, McNeil, Redd and D. Roden.

The starting lineup for Yale was: Artemus Gates (left end), Charles Taft (left tackle), Fred Graham (left guard), Reginald Hutchinson (center), Charles Galt (right guard), Howard M. Baldrige (right tackle), Charles Comerford (right end), Howell Van Nostrand (quarterback), Robert Bingham (left halfback), Harry LeGore (right halfback), Emile Jacques (fullback). The substitutes were: James Braden, Harold Carey, Lawrence Fox, Joseph Neville and Philip Zenner.

=== North Carolina A&M ===
North Carolina A&M vs. VPI

Team	1	2	3	4	Total
NC A&M	0	0	0	0	0
• VPI	7	6	6	21	40

- Date: October 28, 1916
- Location: League Park
  Norfolk, VA
- Game start: 2:30 p.m.
- Game attendance: 3,000
- Referee: Jack Gass

The starting lineup for VPI was: Gregory (left end), Parrish (left tackle), Treakle (left guard), A. B. Moore (center), A. P. Moore (right guard), Caffee (right tackle), Younger (right end), E. Roden (quarterback), Funkhouser (left halfback), Nelson (right halfback), Redd (fullback). The substitutes were: Gaines, Gardner, Howell, Lancaster, McNeil, Palmer, G. Parrish, Pritchard, D. Roden, Somerville, Stringer and Turber.

The starting lineup for North Carolina A&M was: N. D. Pierson (left end), Solomon Homewood (left tackle), Lawrence (left guard), William Whitaker (center), A. D. Nance (right guard), Cooke (right tackle), Andrew McMurray (right end), James McDougall (quarterback), Lee (left halfback), Rice (right halfback), Van Brocklin (fullback). The substitutes were: J. H. Baugham, Haynes, Hill, William Hodgin, Johnson, Parks and Spivey.

=== North Carolina ===
North Carolina vs. VPI

Team	1	2	3	4	Total
UNC	0	7	0	0	7
• VPI	7	7	0	0	14

- Date: November 4, 1916
- Location: Fair Grounds
  Roanoke, VA
- Game start: 3:00 p.m.
- Referee: Jack Gass

The starting lineup for VPI was: Gregory (left end), Hall (left tackle), Parrish (left guard), A. B. Moore (center), A. P. Moore (right guard), Caffee (right tackle), Younger (right end), Lancaster (quarterback), Nelson (left halfback), Gardner (right halfback), Redd (fullback). The substitutes were: Funkhouser, Gaines, Howell and E. Roden.

The starting lineup for North Carolina was: James Love (left end), John Tayloe (left tackle), William Grimes (left guard), Yank Tandy (center), Beemer Harrell (right guard), James Ramsay (right tackle), Edward Proctor (right end), Macon Williams (quarterback), Edward Fitzsimmons (left halfback), Bill Folger (right halfback), George Tennant (fullback). The substitutes were: Barton, Hargrove Bellamy, Hugh Black, James Coleman and Davis.

=== Wake Forest ===
Wake Forest at VPI

Team	1	2	3	4	Total
WF	0	0	0	0	0
• VPI	19	6	14	13	52

- Date: November 11, 1916
- Location: Miles Field
  Blacksburg, VA
- Referee: Marshall (Maine)

The starting lineup for VPI was: Gregory (left end), Hall (left tackle), Howell (left guard), A. B. Moore (center), Parrish (right guard), Caffee (right tackle), Younger (right end), E. Roden (quarterback), Gardner (left halfback), Nelson (right halfback), Redd (fullback). The substitutes were: D. Roden and Stringer.

The starting lineup for Wake Forest was: William Harris (left end), Hubert Olive (left tackle), John Blizzard (left guard), Oscar Blankenship (center), Shaw (right guard), T. C. McKnight (right tackle), Hank Langston (right end), Ashley Pace (quarterback), Phinehas Croom (left halfback), Ralph Champion (right halfback), Charles Parker (fullback). The substitutes were: Coble, W. T. Foreman, Robert Humber, John Pace and William Savage.

=== Roanoke ===
Roanoke vs. VPI

Team	1	2	3	4	Total
Roanoke	0	0	0	0	0
• VPI	13	7	0	21	41

- Date: November 18, 1916
- Location: Miles Field
  Blacksburg, VA
- Game weather: "exceptionally cold"
- Referee: Izard (W&L)

The starting lineup for VPI was: Gregory (left end), Hall (left tackle), Parrish (left guard), A. B. Moore (center), Howell (right guard), Caffee (right tackle), Younger (right end), E. Roden (quarterback), Gardner (left halfback), Nelson (right halfback), Redd (fullback). The substitutes were: Funkhouser, Lancaster, McNeil and Stringer.

The starting lineup for Roanoke was: Carl Huddle (left end), Fred Easter (left tackle), Frank Cadwallader (left guard), M. W. Krieger (center), P. B. Smith (right guard), S. L. Bonham (right tackle), Douglas Chapman (right end), J. B. Anspach (quarterback), Douglas Bunting (left halfback), Reid Duncan (right halfback), James Bonham (fullback). The substitutes were: A. B. Buschong, Fray, J. E. Hollingsworth, W. D. Hull, Kegey and S. White Rhyne.

=== VMI ===
The starting lineup for VPI was: Gregory (left end), Hall (left tackle), Parrish (left guard), A. B. Moore (center), A. P. Moore (right guard), Caffee (right tackle), Younger (right end), E. Roden (quarterback), Gaines (left halfback), Nelson (right halfback), Redd (fullback). The substitutes were: Funkhouser, Howell, Lancaster, McNeil, Reimer, Somerville and Stringer.

The starting lineup for VMI was: Mose Goodman (left end), Matthew Steele (left tackle), Hawkins (left guard), James Nelms (center), Root (right guard), Steele Hawkins (right tackle), Peyton Marshall (right end), Gray (quarterback), Stanton Bertschey (left halfback), George Engleby (right halfback), Hart (fullback). The substitutes were: Jimmy Leech, Horace Roberdeau, Silverstein, Sullivan, Thomas, William Whittle and Samuel Witt.

== After the season ==
In December 1916, the VPI players elected James Atkins Gregory as captain of the 1917 VPI Gobblers football team.

== Players ==
=== Roster ===
VPI 1916 roster
Quarterbacks: Douglas Lancaster; Edwin Roden; Guards: Russell Howell; Harry Parrish; Arthur Penick Moore; Tackles: John Caffee (Capt.); Lyle Hall	Center: Arthur Blakie Moore; Ends: James Gregory; Monk Younger; Halfbacks: Frank Engleby; Edward Funkhouser; Leonard Gaines; Robert Nelson; Fullback: Henry Redd	Substitutes: Clinton T. Barnes; Jay Frank Clemmer; Frank Edward Daly; James W. Farmer; Morgan Gardner; Turner Ashby Graves; Francis Alexander Gray; William Murry Lybrook; Guy Eugene McNeil; Donald Mack; George Frizzell Parrish; Daniel Harris Pritchard; Harry Douglas Roden; George Selben Somerville; Llewellyn Winn "Lew" Stringer; George Ellsworth Treakle

=== Monogram Club members ===
Fifteen players received monograms for their participation on the 1916 VPI team.

Player	Hometown	Notes
John Staub Caffee	Norfolk, Virginia	
Frank Allison Engleby	Roanoke, Virginia	
Edward Kramer Funkhouser	Harrisonburg, Virginia	
Leonard Myrton Gaines	Richmond, Virginia	
James Atkins Gregory	Chase City, Virginia	
Lysle George Hall	Charlottesville, Virginia	
Russell Minor Howell	Fincastle, Virginia	
George Douglas Lancaster	Ashland, Virginia	
Arthur Blakie Moore	Buchanan, Virginia	Fought in World War I and was killed during the Meuse–Argonne offensive.
Arthur Penick Moore	Ringgold, Virginia	
Robert Rodes Nelson	Roanoke, Virginia	
Harry Temple Parrish	Bristol, Virginia	
Henry Redd	Martinsville, Virginia	
Edwin Lee Roden	Richmond, Virginia	
William Lee Younger	Lynchburg, Virginia	

== Coaching and training staff ==
- Head coach: Jack E. Ingersoll
- Assistant coach: Harlan Sanborn
- Manager: Walton Marshall Ellingsworth
- Assistant managers
  - George E. Caffee
  - William Reid Williams, Jr.
