= Thomas O'Sullivan (disambiguation) =

Thomas O'Sullivan was an Australian politician.

Thomas or Tom(my) O'Sullivan may also refer to:

== Sportspeople ==
- Tom O'Sullivan (Dingle Gaelic footballer) (born 1996), Kerry Gaelic footballer
- Tom O'Sullivan (Rathmore Gaelic footballer) (born 1978), Kerry Gaelic footballer
- Tom O'Sullivan (hurler), Irish hurler
- Tommy O'Sullivan (born 1995), Welsh footballer

== Other ==
- Tom O'Sullivan (actor), Australian television, film and theatre actor
- Thomas C. O'Sullivan (1858–1913), American politician
- Tomás Rua Ó Súilleabháin (1785–1848), Irish poet

== See also ==
- Thomas Sullivan (disambiguation)
