= 1916 Georgetown Blue and Gray football team =

American college football season

1916 Georgetown Blue and Gray football
- Conference: South Atlantic Intercollegiate Athletic Association
- Record: 9–1 (2–0 SAIAA)
- Head coach: Albert Exendine (3rd season)
- Home stadium: Georgetown Field

1916 South Atlantic Intercollegiate Athletic Association football standings
	Conf.					Overall
Team	W		L		T	W		L		T
VPI $	4	–	0	–	0	7	–	2	–	0
Georgetown	2	–	0	–	0	8	–	1	–	0
Washington and Lee	1	–	0	–	0	5	–	2	–	2
George Washington	2	–	1	–	0	3	–	3	–	1
North Carolina	2	–	1	–	0	5	–	4	–	0
Catholic University	2	–	1	–	0	4	–	4	–	0
Virginia	2	–	1	–	0	4	–	5	–	0
Davidson	1	–	2	–	0	5	–	3	–	1
Richmond	1	–	3	–	1	5	–	4	–	2
VMI	1	–	4	–	0	4	–	5	–	0
St. John's (MD)	0	–	1	–	0	0	–	1	–	0
William & Mary	0	–	2	–	1	2	–	5	–	2
Johns Hopkins	0	–	2	–	0	0	–	2	–	0
North Carolina A&M	0	–	4	–	0	2	–	5	–	0
$ – Conference champion

The 1916 Georgetown Blue and Gray football team represented Georgetown University during the 1916 college football season. Led by Albert Exendine in his third year as head coach, the team went 9–1. Georgetown's 464 points was the most among major programs, and Johnny Gilroy led individual scorers with 160 points. The season's highlight was the defeat of Dartmouth.

== Schedule ==
Date	Time	Opponent	Site	Result	Attendance	Source
October 7		at Navy*	Worden Field; Annapolis, MD	L 7–13		
October 14		Eastern (VA)*	Georgetown Field; Washington, DC	W 69–7		
October 21		vs. Dartmouth*	Haverhill Field; Haverhill, MA	W 10–0		
October 28		Albright*	Georgetown Field; Washington, DC	W 80–0		
November 7		at Fordham*	Fordham Field; Bronx, NY	W 13–0	10,000	
November 11	2:30 p.m.	West Virginia Wesleyan*	Georgetown Field; Washington, DC	W 47–0		
November 18		North Carolina A&M	Georgetown Field; Washington, DC	W 61–6		
November 25		Bucknell*	Georgetown Field; Washington, DC	W 78–0		
November 30		vs. George Washington	National Park; Washington, DC	W 47–7	5,000	
December 9		at Tulane*	Heinemann Park; New Orleans, LA	W 61–0		
*Non-conference game
