= 1916 Davidson Wildcats football team =

American college football season

1916 Davidson Wildcats football
- Conference: South Atlantic Intercollegiate Athletic Association
- Record: 5–3–1 (1–2 SAIAA)
- Head coach: Bill Fetzer (2nd season)
- Home stadium: Sprunt Athletic Field

1916 South Atlantic Intercollegiate Athletic Association football standings
	Conf.					Overall
Team	W		L		T	W		L		T
VPI $	4	–	0	–	0	7	–	2	–	0
Georgetown	2	–	0	–	0	8	–	1	–	0
Washington and Lee	1	–	0	–	0	5	–	2	–	2
George Washington	2	–	1	–	0	3	–	3	–	1
North Carolina	2	–	1	–	0	5	–	4	–	0
Catholic University	2	–	1	–	0	4	–	4	–	0
Virginia	2	–	1	–	0	4	–	5	–	0
Davidson	1	–	2	–	0	5	–	3	–	1
Richmond	1	–	3	–	1	5	–	4	–	2
VMI	1	–	4	–	0	4	–	5	–	0
St. John's (MD)	0	–	1	–	0	0	–	1	–	0
William & Mary	0	–	2	–	1	2	–	5	–	2
Johns Hopkins	0	–	2	–	0	0	–	2	–	0
North Carolina A&M	0	–	4	–	0	2	–	5	–	0
$ – Conference champion

The 1916 Davidson Wildcats football team was an American football team that represented the Davidson College as a member of the South Atlantic Intercollegiate Athletic Association (SAIAA) during the 1916 college football season. In their second year under head coach Bill Fetzer, the team compiled a 5–3–1 record.

== Schedule ==
Date	Time	Opponent	Site	Result	Attendance	Source
September 30		at Virginia	Lambeth Field; Charlottesville, VA	L 0–14		
October 7		vs. North Carolina A&M	Wearn Field; Charlotte, NC	W 16–0		
October 14		at Georgia Tech*	Grant Field; Atlanta, GA	L 0–9		
October 21		The Citadel*	Sprunt Athletic Field; Davidson, NC	T 7–7		
October 28		at Roanoke*	Roanoke, VA	W 20–0		
November 4	3:30 p.m.	at Furman*	Augusta Street Park; Greenville, SC	W 46–14	900	
November 11		vs. North Carolina	Prince Albert Park; Winston-Salem, NC	L 6–10		
November 23		at Wofford*	Spartanburg, SC	W 35–0		
November 30		vs. Clemson*	Wearn Field; Charlotte, NC	W 33–0		
*Non-conference game; All times are in Eastern time
