= 1916 North Carolina A&M Aggies football team =

American college football season

1916 North Carolina A&M Aggies football
- Conference: South Atlantic Intercollegiate Athletic Association
- Record: 2–5 (0–4 SAIAA)
- Head coach: Britain Patterson (1st season)
- Home stadium: Riddick Stadium

1916 South Atlantic Intercollegiate Athletic Association football standings
	Conf.					Overall
Team	W		L		T	W		L		T
VPI $	4	–	0	–	0	7	–	2	–	0
Georgetown	2	–	0	–	0	8	–	1	–	0
Washington and Lee	1	–	0	–	0	5	–	2	–	2
George Washington	2	–	1	–	0	3	–	3	–	1
North Carolina	2	–	1	–	0	5	–	4	–	0
Catholic University	2	–	1	–	0	4	–	4	–	0
Virginia	2	–	1	–	0	4	–	5	–	0
Davidson	1	–	2	–	0	5	–	3	–	1
Richmond	1	–	3	–	1	5	–	4	–	2
VMI	1	–	4	–	0	4	–	5	–	0
St. John's (MD)	0	–	1	–	0	0	–	1	–	0
William & Mary	0	–	2	–	1	2	–	5	–	2
Johns Hopkins	0	–	2	–	0	0	–	2	–	0
North Carolina A&M	0	–	4	–	0	2	–	5	–	0
$ – Conference champion

The 1916 North Carolina A&M Aggies football team represented the North Carolina A&M Aggies of North Carolina College of Agriculture and Mechanic Arts (now known as North Carolina State University) during the 1916 college football season. In Britain Patterson's first season with the Aggies, the team suffered blowout losses to Davidson, VPI, Navy, and Washington and Lee. North Carolina A&M was also whipped, 61–5, by Georgetown in the worst defeat in school history up to that point. The Aggies were outscored 191 to 24 against their seven opponents. They finished last in the South Atlantic Intercollegiate Athletic Association (SAIAA), losing to all four of their conference opponents by a total point margin of 128 to 5.

== Schedule ==
Date	Opponent	Site	Result	Attendance	Source
September 30	Roanoke*	Riddick Stadium; Raleigh, NC	W 13–3	750	
October 7	vs. Davidson	Wearn Field; Charlotte, NC	L 0–16		
October 19	Wake Forest*	Riddick Stadium; Raleigh, NC (rivalry)	W 6–0		
October 28	vs. VPI	League Park; Norfolk, VA	L 0–40		
November 11	at Navy*	Worden Field; Annapolis, MD	L 0–50		
November 18	at Georgetown	Georgetown Field; Washington, DC	L 6–61		
November 30	Washington and Lee	Riddick Stadium; Raleigh, NC	L 0–21	5,000	
*Non-conference game
