= 1916 VMI Keydets football team =

American college football season

1916 VMI Keydets football
- Conference: South Atlantic Intercollegiate Athletic Association
- Record: 4–5 (1–4 SAIAA)
- Head coach: Frank Gorton (3rd season)
- Home stadium: VMI Parade Ground

1916 South Atlantic Intercollegiate Athletic Association football standings
	Conf.					Overall
Team	W		L		T	W		L		T
VPI $	4	–	0	–	0	7	–	2	–	0
Georgetown	2	–	0	–	0	8	–	1	–	0
Washington and Lee	1	–	0	–	0	5	–	2	–	2
George Washington	2	–	1	–	0	3	–	3	–	1
North Carolina	2	–	1	–	0	5	–	4	–	0
Catholic University	2	–	1	–	0	4	–	4	–	0
Virginia	2	–	1	–	0	4	–	5	–	0
Davidson	1	–	2	–	0	5	–	3	–	1
Richmond	1	–	3	–	1	5	–	4	–	2
VMI	1	–	4	–	0	4	–	5	–	0
St. John's (MD)	0	–	1	–	0	0	–	1	–	0
William & Mary	0	–	2	–	1	2	–	5	–	2
Johns Hopkins	0	–	2	–	0	0	–	2	–	0
North Carolina A&M	0	–	4	–	0	2	–	5	–	0
$ – Conference champion

The 1916 VMI Keydets football team represented the Virginia Military Institute (VMI) in their 26th season of organized football. Led by third-year head coach Frank Gorton, the Keydets went 4–5. After a 3–0 start with three shutout victories, VMI lost five out of their final six games.

== Schedule ==
Date	Time	Opponent	Site	Result	Attendance	Source
September 30		Hampden–Sydney*	VMI Parade Ground; Lexington, VA	W 19–0		
October 7		William & Mary	VMI Parade Ground; Lexington, VA (rivalry)	W 66–0		
October 14		Gallaudet*	VMI Parade Ground; Lexington, VA	W 54–0		
October 21		at Maryland State*	College Park, MD	L 9–15		
October 28		at North Carolina	Emerson Field; Chapel Hill, NC	L 13–38		
November 4		Catholic University	VMI Parade Ground; Lexington, VA	L 14–16		
November 11		vs. Clemson*	Richmond, VA	W 37–7		
November 18		at Virginia	Lambeth Field; Charlottesville, VA	L 7–20		
November 30	2:30 p.m.	vs. VPI	Fair Grounds; Roanoke, VA (rivalry)	L 14–23	5,000	
*Non-conference game
