= 1916 Washington and Lee Generals football team =

American college football season

1916 Washington and Lee Generals football
- Conference: South Atlantic Intercollegiate Athletic Association
- Record: 5–2–2 (1–0 SAIAA)
- Head coach: Jogger Elcock (3rd season)
- Captain: Harry Young
- Home stadium: Wilson Field

1916 South Atlantic Intercollegiate Athletic Association football standings
	Conf.					Overall
Team	W		L		T	W		L		T
VPI $	4	–	0	–	0	7	–	2	–	0
Georgetown	2	–	0	–	0	8	–	1	–	0
Washington and Lee	1	–	0	–	0	5	–	2	–	2
George Washington	2	–	1	–	0	3	–	3	–	1
North Carolina	2	–	1	–	0	5	–	4	–	0
Catholic University	2	–	1	–	0	4	–	4	–	0
Virginia	2	–	1	–	0	4	–	5	–	0
Davidson	1	–	2	–	0	5	–	3	–	1
Richmond	1	–	3	–	1	5	–	4	–	2
VMI	1	–	4	–	0	4	–	5	–	0
St. John's (MD)	0	–	1	–	0	0	–	1	–	0
William & Mary	0	–	2	–	1	2	–	5	–	2
Johns Hopkins	0	–	2	–	0	0	–	2	–	0
North Carolina A&M	0	–	4	–	0	2	–	5	–	0
$ – Conference champion

The 1916 Washington and Lee Generals football team represented Washington and Lee University during the 1916 college football season. The Generals were coached by Jogger Elcock in his third year as head coach, compiling a record of 5–2–2 (1–0 SAIAA). The team gave John Heisman's Georgia Tech Yellow Jackets its only blemish with a 7–7 tie. It was captained by College Football Hall of Fame inductee Harry Young.

Tackle Bob Ignico was selected third-team All-American by Walter Camp.

== Schedule ==
Date	Time	Opponent	Site	Result	Attendance	Source
September 30		Randolph–Macon*	Wilson Field; Lexington, VA	W 80–0		
October 7		at Army*	The Plain; West Point, NY	L 7–14		
October 14		at Rutgers*	Neilson Field; Piscataway, NJ	T 13–13		
October 21		Roanoke*	Wilson Field; Lexington, VA	W 30–0		
October 28		at Georgia Tech*	Grant Field; Atlanta, GA	T 7–7		
November 4	2:30 p.m.	at Navy*	Worden Field; Annapolis, MD	W 10–0		
November 11		Bucknell*	Wilson Field; Lexington, VA	W 55–7		
November 18		vs. Washington & Jefferson*	Broad Street Park; Richmond, VA	L 6–10		
November 30		at North Carolina A&M	Riddick Stadium; Raleigh, NC	W 21–0	5,000	
*Non-conference game; All times are in Eastern time
