= Peyton Evans =

American football player and coach (1892–1972)

Biographical details
- Born: October 18, 1892; Amherst, Virginia, U.S.
- Died: February 24, 1972 (aged 79)
- Education: VPI

Coaching career (HC unless noted)
- 1916: Virginia

Head coaching record
- Overall: 4–5

Peyton Randolph Evans (October 18, 1892 – February 24, 1972) was an American football player and coach. He was the head football coach at the University of Virginia in 1916. Evans attended Virginia Polytechnic Institute, where he played football.

Evans later worked as a lawyer in Prince George, Virginia and served as a counsel and executive secretary of the Washington Newspaper Publishers Association. He died in 1972.

== Head coaching record ==
Year	Team	Overall	Conference	Standing	Bowl/playoffs
Virginia Virginia Orange and Blue (South Atlantic Intercollegiate Athletic Association) (1916)
1916	Virginia	4–5	3–1	T–5th	
Virginia:		4–5	3–1		
Total:		4–5			
