= 2002 San Francisco Bowl =

2002 Diamond Walnut San Francisco Bowl
- Bowl Game
Air Force Falcons	Virginia Tech Hokies
(8–4)	(9–4)
Mountain West	Big East
13	20
Head coach: Fisher DeBerry	Head coach: Frank Beamer
	AP / Coaches / BCS; 21 / 19 / NR
	1	2	3	4	Total
Air Force	10	0	0	3	13
Virginia Tech	7	3	7	3	20
- Date: December 31, 2002
- Season: 2002
- Stadium: Pacific Bell Park
- Location: San Francisco
- Favorite: Virginia Tech by 11.5
- Referee: Gordon Riese (Pac-10)
- Attendance: 25,966

United States TV coverage
- Network: ESPN2
- Announcers: Pam Ward, Chris Spielman, and Rob Stone
- Nielsen ratings: 1.6

The 2002 San Francisco Bowl was the inaugural edition of the post-season college football bowl game between the Virginia Tech Hokies and the Air Force Falcons at Pacific Bell Park in San Francisco on December 31, 2002. The game was the final contest of the 2002 NCAA Division I-A football season for both teams, and ended in a 20–13 victory for Virginia Tech.

Virginia Tech was selected for the inaugural edition of the San Francisco Bowl after a 9–4 record during the 2002 college football season. Tech defeated several nationally ranked teams, including No. 14 LSU and No. 19 Texas A&M. Tech's opponent, Air Force, received its bid following an 8–4 regular season. Air Force faced several BCS-conference opponents during the regular season, including California and Northwestern.

The 2002 San Francisco Bowl kicked off in clear, 69 °F (21 °C) weather, but the field was soggy after several days of rain. In the first seven minutes of the game, Air Force scored 10 consecutive unanswered points. The Tech defense eventually clamped down on the Falcons' offense, however, and only allowed three points for the remainder of the game. The Virginia Tech offense slowly climbed back from the initial 10-point deficit, scoring a touchdown in the first quarter and a field goal in the second. By halftime, the Hokies had equalized the score at 10–10.

In the second half, defense continued to dominate as Tech gradually built a lead. The Hokies scored the only points of a third quarter as running back Lee Suggs ran into the end zone from one yard out, allowing Tech to take a 17–10 lead into the fourth quarter. The Falcons didn't give up easily, however. Air Force kicker Joey Ashcroft cut into the Tech lead with a 21-yard field goal. Tech matched the score later in the quarter to restore the one-touchdown lead. As time ran down, Air Force had one final chance to tie the game and send it into overtime. Beginning at its own 18-yard line with 4:11 left to play, the Falcons drove deep into Tech territory. With seven seconds remaining, Air Force quarterback Chance Harridge tried to scramble into the end zone, but was stopped before the goal line by Tech cornerback Ronyell Whitaker. The defensive stop preserved the 20–13 Hokie victory, and Tech quarterback Bryan Randall was named the game's most valuable player.

== Team selection ==
=== Air Force ===
The Air Force Falcons began the 2002 season having gone 6–6 during the previous season, and hoping to put that disappointing showing behind them. On August 31, 2002, the Falcons did just that, defeating Northwestern in a blowout 52–3 victory. Following that win, the Falcons added five more in successive weeks, racing out to a 6–0 undefeated start. On October 19, the Falcons faced No. 19 Notre Dame, and in a close-fought game, suffered their first loss. In the five games that followed the loss to Notre Dame, the Falcons suffered three additional losses, culminating in a close regular-season defeat by the San Diego State Aztecs.

After starting with six straight wins, the Falcons finished with an overall regular-season record of 8–4 and a Mountain West Conference record of 4–3, putting them third in the conference. Air Force was one of three bowl-eligible teams in the Mountain West during the 2002 season. MWC champion Colorado State earned an automatic bid to the Liberty Bowl, and the Las Vegas Bowl, which had second pick of MWC teams, selected New Mexico. By default, this left Air Force to the San Francisco Bowl.

=== Virginia Tech ===
The Virginia Tech Hokies football team began the 2002 season having gone 8–4 the previous season and having suffered a season-ending defeat to Florida State in the 2002 Gator Bowl. The Hokies began the season against the Arkansas State Indians, hoping to rebuild after the loss of 11 starters from the previous season's team. Against the Indians, Tech started the season with a record performance, scoring 56 first-half points en route to a 63–7 rout.

That overwhelming start was just the beginning for the Hokies, who won their next seven games, racing to an 8–0 start and a No. 3 ranking in the national polls. In their ninth game of the season, however, the Hokies suffered their first loss, falling 21–28 to the Pittsburgh Panthers. The next week, Tech suffered an even closer loss, losing to Syracuse in triple overtime despite a record performance from Tech quarterback Bryan Randall, who accumulated 504 passing yards and five touchdown passes.

In the three games following the loss to Syracuse, Tech lost two, taking it to a final regular-season record of 9–4 overall and a Big East conference record of 3–4, meaning Tech was the fourth ranked team in the Big East that season. Prior to the season, the Big East had signed an agreement with the new San Francisco Bowl, giving that bowl the fifth pick of bowl-eligible teams in the Big East. But with the Gator Bowl (second pick of Big East teams) selecting Notre Dame instead of a Big East team, all the Big East's selections were pushed back one slot. Second-place West Virginia University was pushed to the Continental Tire Bowl (third pick) and third-place Pittsburgh was selected by the Insight Bowl (fourth pick), leaving Virginia Tech to be selected by the San Francisco Bowl with the fifth pick.

== Pregame buildup ==
On the day prior to the game, spread bettors favored Virginia Tech to win by 11.5 points. Despite that advantage, Tech head coach Frank Beamer warned his team and the public about the threat underdog Air Force posed to the Hokies' chances of winning. Both Beamer and Air Force head coach Fisher DeBerry were among the longest-tenured coaches in college football at the time. DeBerry had been a college coach for 19 years, while Beamer had coached for 16 years. The game would be an opportunity for DeBerry to gain his 150th career win and defeat a ranked team for the first time since 1999. Ticket sales prior to the game were sluggish, as both teams failed to sell out their assigned allotments for the New Year's Eve clash, and local sales registered fewer than 8,000 tickets sold. In addition, local media coverage of the game was very sparse.

=== Offensive matchups ===
==== Air Force ====
Prior to the San Francisco Bowl, Air Force's offense was the No. 1-ranked rushing offense in the country, accumulating 314.5 rushing yards on average per game. Air Force quarterback Chance Harridge had 1,159 rushing yards and 22 rushing touchdowns, setting what was then an NCAA record for most rushing touchdowns in a single season by a quarterback. Through the air, he completed 60 of 125 passes during the regular season for 971 passing yards and 10 touchdowns. Heading into the San Francisco Bowl, he needed just 29 passing yards to become the 16th player in NCAA Division I-A history to run for 1,000 yards and pass for 1,000 yards in a single season.

Air Force running back Leotis Palmer was having the best season of his career heading into the San Francisco Bowl. During the regular season, he accumulated 537 rushing yards, four rushing touchdowns and 113 passing yards for two touchdowns. Palmer and the Falcons had already clinched the season's rushing title, cementing their status as the No. 1 rushing team in the country after West Virginia—the second-place team—failed to gain sufficient yardage in its final game to pass the Falcons. Despite finishing with the top-ranked rushing offense, none of Air Force's offensive linemen received postseason honors. "It should give our players a lot of incentive for next year. Hopefully, if we repeat next year, maybe we'll get two or three on there. You certainly don't accumulate the number of yards we do unless you have people up front doing their job", DeBerry said at the time.

Prior to the game, offensive tackle Blane Neufeld was pronounced unable to play due to a broken foot suffered two weeks prior to the San Francisco Bowl.

==== Virginia Tech ====
The Virginia Tech offense averaged 31.5 points per game during the regular season. In the weeks before the San Francisco Bowl, Virginia Tech running back Lee Suggs was cast as the key for that offense in the game. Suggs, for whom the game would be his last as a collegiate player, rushed for 1,255 yards and 20 touchdowns during the regular season. He needed just 149 more rushing yards to set the team's record for single-season rushing yards, which stood at 1,403. Even without the record, Suggs was predicted to be a high pick in that year's NFL draft. Suggs was supported by Virginia Tech center Jake Grove, who anchored a strong Tech offensive line. Though criticized as being too "nasty", Grove led the team in knockdown blocks and was graded as the team's most efficient lineman. About Grove, Suggs said, "He gets the blocking scheme straight. ... He gets us ready to go."

Also benefiting from the offensive line's strength was Tech quarterback Bryan Randall. Randall finished the regular season with 1,957 passing yards and 12 passing touchdowns, completing 140 of his 225 passes during the process. He also was successful running the ball, carrying it for 527 yards and three touchdowns during the regular season.

=== Defensive matchups ===
==== Air Force ====
During the 2002 season, Air Force allowed an average of 360.7 yards per game, fourth in the Mountain West and 57th nationally. This was an improvement over the 2001 season, when the Falcons allowed 452.7 yards per game on average. Air Force also was allowing far fewer points per game. In 2002, the Falcons allowed an average of 23.6 points per game, down from more than 32 per game in 2001. Air Force was successful in its kicking defense as well. Between 1990 and 2002, Air Force ranked second in terms of blocked kicks with 79. Virginia Tech was first, with 85. In the starting lineup, Air Force sophomore Joel Kurzdorfer replaced Mark Marsh at strong safety who was pronounced doubtful for the game due to a lower leg injury he suffered in the days leading up to the San Francisco Bowl.

==== Virginia Tech ====
The Virginia Tech defense looked to recover from its slide during the last five games of the regular season. During the Hokies' first eight games (all wins), Tech gave up averages of 10.5 points, 267.5 total yards and 40.8 rushing yards per game. In the final five games (in which Tech went 1–4), the Hokie defense allowed averages of 32.8 points, 446.7 total yards and 229.4 rushing yards per game. This led to doubts about Tech's ability to stop the Falcons' top-ranked rushing attack. Head defensive coach Bud foster said, "... right now you just kind of have a question mark: Are we going to do what we're taught to do?" That late-season falter still saw Tech ranked as the No. 20 rushing defense in the country heading into the San Francisco Bowl, allowing an average of just 113.31 yards per game.

One of the keys for the Hokie defense would be linebacker Brandon Manning, who attended the Air Force Academy's preparatory school before deciding to walk on to Virginia Tech's football team instead of attending the Academy. Manning was Tech's No. 3 tackler in terms of statistics, accumulating 70 tackles during the course of the regular season. Virginia Tech defensive tackle Jimmy Williams injured his ankle two days prior to the game, causing him to be unable to play. Tech's Richard Johnson was also listed as injured and unlikely to play.

== Game summary ==
The 2002 San Francisco Bowl kicked off at 7:30 p.m. PST on December 31, 2002, in San Francisco, California. The weather at kickoff was clear and cool, with an air temperature of 69 °F (21 °C). Rain showers had fallen earlier in the day and throughout the week leading up to the game, causing the field to become slippery for players. The game was broadcast on ESPN2, and Pam Ward, Chris Spielman, and Rob Stone were the sportscasters. The broadcast earned a television rating of 1.6, meaning an estimated 1.69 million people watched the game on television. The game's attendance was given as 25,966, but the actual attendance was far lower than that figure.

=== First quarter ===
Virginia Tech kicked off to Air Force to begin the game. The Falcons returned the kickoff to their 20-yard line, where the game began. On the game's first play, running back Leotis Palmer ran for a short gain out of the Falcons' triple option offense, which Air Force used throughout the game. After the short gain, Falcons quarterback Chance Harridge completed a 47-yard pass to junior wide receiver Anthony Park. This was a surprise because the Falcons had been ranked among the least-proficient teams in the country in terms of passing offense. The pass drove the Falcons offense deep into Virginia Tech territory, and Air Force continued to advance the ball with a series of short rushes that resulted in a first down. Then, on the sixth play of the Air Force drive, freshman running back Matt Ward ran a reverse for 15 yards and the game's first touchdown. Air Force kicker Joey Ashcroft successfully completed the extra point, and Air Force took a 7–0 lead with 12 minutes remaining in the first quarter.

Virginia Tech received the post-touchdown kickoff and returned it to their 31-yard line, where the Tech offense took over on its first possession of the game. Tech running back Lee Suggs ran for a three-yard gain, and quarterback Bryan Randall completed a 15-yard pass to take the Hokies to near midfield, earning Virginia Tech a first down in the process. But on the third play after taking possession, the Hokies turned the ball over as Tech running back Lee Suggs fumbled the ball. Air Force recovered the turnover and returned it to the Tech 35-yard line, where the Falcons offense returned to the field. Despite gaining possession of the ball deep inside Virginia Tech's side of the field, Air Force was unable to move the ball forward with much success. After a quick first down provided by a penalty against Virginia Tech, the Hokie defense stiffened and denied the Falcons another. Air Force was forced to attempt a 45-yard field goal, which Ashcroft converted with 7:36 left in the quarter to give the Falcons a 10–0.

Air Force's post-score kickoff went out of bounds, resulting in a penalty that allowed Tech to automatically start its second offensive possession of the game at its 35-yard line. On his first play, Randall completed a 19-yard pass that drove the Hokie offense into Air Force territory for the first time and gained Tech another first down. Two plays later, Randall completed another pass, this time a 16-yard toss that pushed Tech to the Air Force 30-yard line. Though the Hokies gained several more yards on short plays, they were unable to earn another first down. Tech kicker Carter Warley was sent into the game to attempt a 41-yard field goal, but the kick bounced off the right upright and Tech was denied three points. With 4:59 remaining in the first quarter, Air Force still held a 10–0 lead.

Following the missed field goal, Air Force's offense began operations at its 24-yard line. Running back Anthony Butler broke free for an 18-yard gain on the third play of the drive, giving Air Force a first down. Two plays later, however, Harridge threw a pass that was intercepted by Tech linebacker Vegas Robinson. At the end of the play, Air Force committed a 15-yard personal foul penalty, which allowed the Tech offense to take over at the Air Force 15-yard line. Tech needed just two plays to drive the 15 yards and earn a touchdown, its first of the game. With 2:26 remaining in the quarter, Air Force's lead had been cut to 10–7.

After Tech's kickoff, Air Force went three and out and was forced to punt. The Hokies took over at their 34-yard line after the kick. Bryan Randall completed two quick passes to wide receiver Shawn Witten for a total of 26 yards before time in the quarter ran out. At the end of the first quarter, Air Force had a 10–7 lead, but Virginia Tech was in possession of the ball and driving deeper into Air Force territory.

=== Second quarter ===
The Hokies began the second quarter in possession of the ball and facing a second down and one yard. After the Tech offense picked up one first down, it was unable to gain another. Facing a fourth down and needing five yards for a first down at the Air Force 29-yard line, Tech head coach Frank Beamer elected to try to gain the first down instead of trying a long field goal. Bryan Randall was sacked for a loss of 10 yards, however, and the Hokies turned the ball over to Air Force after failing to gain the first down.

Air Force began its offensive possession at its 39-yard line, and like Virginia Tech, soon found itself facing a fourth down. Like Virginia Tech, it elected to try to convert the down, but unlike Virginia Tech, the Falcons were successful in gaining the needed yardage. Two plays later, however, Harridge threw his second interception of the game to the Tech defense. Tech's offense took the field, and gained a first down, but was forced to punt after failing to gain a second. Air Force likewise gained a first down on offense and did gain a second, but could not gain a third.

After another Falcon punt, the Hokies took over on offense at their 49-yard line with 4:12 remaining before halftime. Tech began advancing the ball, and was aided by a 15-yard penalty against Air Force that pushed the Hokies deep into Falcons territory. Running backs Kevin Jones and Lee Suggs advanced the ball on the ground with short rushes, and Randall contributed short passes at times, gaining needed first downs when required. Tech advanced the ball inside the Air Force 10-yard line, gaining a first down at the nine-yard line. There, the Air Force defense stiffened. Virginia Tech gained four yards on three plays, but was unable to cross the goal line for another touchdown. Virginia Tech kicker Warley entered the game to attempt his second field goal try of the game. The 23-yard kick was more successful than his first try, and with 25 seconds remaining in the first half, tied the game at 10–10.

Air Force received the kickoff and ran one quick rushing play to allow the first half to come to an end with the score tied at 10.

=== Third quarter ===
Because Air Force received the ball to begin the game, Virginia Tech received the ball to begin the second half. Tech returned the kickoff to its 25-yard line, where the Hokie offense began the first drive of the second half. The Tech offense used rushes by Lee Suggs and passes by Bryan Randall to pick up several first downs and drive into Air Force territory. But once on the Falcons' side of the field, Tech proved unable to gain another first down and was even pushed back into its own territory by a penalty. Tech was forced to punt, and Air Force began its first offensive possession of the second half at its 20-yard line after a touchback.

On the first Air Force play of the second half, quarterback Chance Harridge ran up the middle of the field for a 21-yard gain. The Falcons followed that first-down play with a series of rushes that resulted in another first down, this time in Virginia Tech territory. But as the Hokies had done before them, the Falcons faltered inside opposition territory. Instead of punting the ball, however, Air Force head coach Fisher DeBerry kept his offense on the field to attempt to gain the needed two yards on fourth down. The attempt was unsuccessful, and Tech's offense returned to the field with 7:40 remaining in the quarter.

The Hokies took over at their 39-yard line, and immediately found success. Randall connected on two 10-yard passes to take the Hokies into Air Force territory. The two passes were followed by a 16-yard run by Tech fullback Doug Easlick for another first down at the Air Force 24-yard line. From there, the Tech ground game continued to eat up yards and result in first downs. Kevin Jones ran the ball twice for 11 yards, then Lee Suggs ran the ball three times for 13 yards, the last carry also resulting in a touchdown. The score and subsequent extra point gave Tech its first lead of the game, 17–10, with 4:45 remaining.

Following the post-touchdown kickoff, the two teams traded punts. Air Force gained a first down before punting, Tech was forced into a three and out, and as the quarter came to an end, Air Force was facing a third down and seven yards at the Tech 29-yard line. Tech still held a 17–10 lead, but the Falcons appeared to be in striking distance.

=== Fourth quarter ===
Air Force began the final quarter of play in possession of the ball and facing a third down at the Virginia Tech 29-yard line. Needing seven yards for a first down, the Falcons picked up six. Instead of attempting a field goal on fourth down, DeBerry ordered another fourth-down conversion, which was successful. Three plays later, Tech's defense again forced a fourth down, and again DeBerry ordered a fourth-down conversion. The try was again successful, and Air Force earned another first down. Virginia Tech's defense continued to prevent Air Force from gaining a big play or a touchdown, however, and forced another fourth down. Considering his third fourth-down conversion in the same drive, coach DeBerry instead sent in kicker Joey Ashcroft, who kicked a 21-yard field goal to cut Virginia Tech's lead to 17–13 with 9:50 to go in the quarter.

Tech returned the post-touchdown kickoff to its 34-yard line, where the Hokies began their first offensive drive of the fourth quarter. Randall ran for nine yards, Suggs for three, then Randall completed two passes for 16 yards to push the Hokies into Air Force territory. Once there, Tech continued to grind forward as Suggs ran the ball on five consecutive plays for 15 yards and a first down. After Randall was sacked for a loss of eight yards, however, Tech sent in Warley, who kicked a 37-yard line to restore Tech's seven-point lead, 20–13, with 4:03 to go in the game.

With time running out, Air Force seemingly had one last opportunity to drive down the field and send the game into overtime with a touchdown and extra point or to win it outright with a touchdown and two-point conversion. The Falcons began their drive at their 18-yard line after Tech's kickoff. At the start, Air Force was aided by a 15-yard penalty against Virginia Tech. From there, the going was less easy, as Air Force used short rushes by Anthony Butler, Harridge, and Steve Massie to gain two first downs and advance the ball into Virginia Tech territory. Then, facing third down at the Virginia Tech 47-yard line, Harridge completed an 18-yard pass to tight end Adam Strecker. It was just Harridge's second completion of the game—the first having taken place in the second play of the game. Following the pass, the Falcons were hampered by a 10-yard illegal blocking penalty, but a 19-yard pass to James "JP" Waller erased that deficit and gave Air Force a first down at the Virginia Tech 10-yard line. Time was rapidly running out, but there was still time for Air Force to attempt a few plays. Harridge threw two passes that fell incomplete, then attempted a desperation run towards the end zone. He was tackled five yards short of the goal line, however, and time expired.

Virginia Tech escaped with the 20–13 victory thanks to the defensive stop.

== Statistical summary ==
Statistical comparison
	AFA	VT
1st downs	17	21
Total yards	318	278
Passing yards	91	177
Rushing yards	227	101
Penalties	7–73	3–25
3rd down conversions	6–17	3–11
4th down conversions	4–5	1–2
Turnovers	2	1
Time of possession	30:25	29:35

Thanks to his performance during the game, Air Force quarterback Chance Harridge became just the fifth player in Air Force history and the 16th player in NCAA Division I-A history to rush for 1,000 yards and pass for 1,000 yards in the same season. Despite that performance, Virginia Tech quarterback Bryan Randall was named the game's most valuable player for his winning effort. Randall finished the game having completed 18 of his 23 passes for 177 yards. Harridge completed four of his 19 passes for 91 yards and two interceptions. After completing a pass on the second play of the game, Harridge did not complete another pass until there were less than five minutes remaining in the game, throwing 11 consecutive incomplete passes in the intervening period.

The 2002 San Francisco Bowl was the final collegiate game of Tech running back Lee Suggs, whose two touchdowns allowed him to finish his collegiate career with 336 points, the second-most career points scored by a player in the Big East. Suggs also extended his NCAA-record streak of consecutive games with a rushing touchdown to 27. That record still stands today. Suggs finished the game with 19 carries for 70 rushing yards and two touchdowns. Tech wide receiver Ernest Wilford, who caught five passes for 50 yards, set what was then a school record for receptions in a season with 51. This broke the record of 46, set by Mike Burnop in 1971.

Air Force finished the game with 227 rushing yards and 318 total yards on offense. The Falcons also committed four 15-yard personal foul penalties in addition to other, more minor, penalties accumulated during the game. Air Force's leading rusher was Anthony Butler, who carried the ball 17 times for 75 yards. Anthony Park was the Falcons' leading receiver, catching Harridge's second-play 47-yard throw for his only reception of the game.

== Postgame effects ==
Virginia Tech's win took it to a final 2002 record of 10–4, while Air Force's loss dropped it to a final record of 8–5. Tech finished with its third 10-win-or-more season in four years, and secured a spot in the final Associated Press Top 25 poll of the season for the fifth consecutive season.

Attendance was low, in part due to Tech fans' reluctance to travel across the country and pay high prices for the chance to do so. Travel agents indicated low business in the weeks leading up to the game, and Tech sold approximately 5,000 tickets—a far lower total than the Hokies' two previous bowl games, when 25,000 tickets each were sold to games in Florida and Louisiana.

== Notes ==
=== References ===
- Lazenby, Roland. Legends: A Pictorial History of Virginia Tech Football. Taylor, Full Court Press (1986) ISBN 978-0-913767-11-5
- Tandler, Rich. Hokie Games: Virginia Tech Football Game by Game 1945–2006. Game by Game Sports Media (September 15, 2007) ISBN 978-0-9723845-2-0
- Virginia Tech Athletics Communications Department. 2002 Virginia Tech football San Francisco Bowl Media Guide. Blacksburg, Virginia (2002)
