= 1916 William & Mary Orange and Black football team =

American college football season

1916 William & Mary Orange and Black football
- Conference: Eastern Virginia Intercollegiate Athletic Association, South Atlantic Intercollegiate Athletic Association
- Record: 2–5–2 (1–4–1 EVIAA, 0–2–1 SAIAA)
- Head coach: Samuel H. Hubbard (1st season)
- Captain: J. F. Wilson

1916 Eastern Virginia Intercollegiate Athletic Association football standings
	Conf.					Overall
Team	W		L		T	W		L		T
Richmond +	4	–	1	–	2	5	–	2	–	2
Hampden–Sydney +	4	–	1	–	2	6	–	3	–	2
Randolph–Macon	1	–	4	–	1	1	–	7	–	1
William & Mary	1	–	4	–	1	2	–	5	–	2
+ – Conference co-champions

1916 South Atlantic Intercollegiate Athletic Association football standings
	Conf.					Overall
Team	W		L		T	W		L		T
VPI $	4	–	0	–	0	7	–	2	–	0
Georgetown	2	–	0	–	0	8	–	1	–	0
Washington and Lee	1	–	0	–	0	5	–	2	–	2
George Washington	2	–	1	–	0	3	–	3	–	1
North Carolina	2	–	1	–	0	5	–	4	–	0
Catholic University	2	–	1	–	0	4	–	4	–	0
Virginia	2	–	1	–	0	4	–	5	–	0
Davidson	1	–	2	–	0	5	–	3	–	1
Richmond	1	–	3	–	1	5	–	4	–	2
VMI	1	–	4	–	0	4	–	5	–	0
St. John's (MD)	0	–	1	–	0	0	–	1	–	0
William & Mary	0	–	2	–	1	2	–	5	–	2
Johns Hopkins	0	–	2	–	0	0	–	2	–	0
North Carolina A&M	0	–	4	–	0	2	–	5	–	0
$ – Conference champion

The 1916 William & Mary Orange and Black football team represented the College of William & Mary as a member of the Eastern Virginia Intercollegiate Athletic Association (EVIAA) and the South Atlantic Intercollegiate Athletic Association (SAIAA) during the 1916 college football season. Led by Samuel H. Hubbard in his first and only year as head coach, William & Mary finished the season 2–5–2 overall, 1–4–1 in EVIAA play, and 0–2–1 against SAIAA opponents.

== Schedule ==
Date	Opponent	Site	Result	Source
September 30	Union Theological Seminary*	Williamsburg, VA	W 7–0	
October 7	at VMI	VMI Parade Ground; Lexington, VA (rivalry)	L 0–66	
October 14	Portsmouth Naval*	Williamsburg, VA	T 13–13	
October 21	Randolph–Macon	Williamsburg, VA	L 0–17	
October 28	at Richmond	Richmond, VA (rivalry)	L 0–48	
November 4	Hampden–Sydney	Williamsburg, VA	L 0–31	
November 11	at Randolph–Macon	Ashland, VA	W 14–7	
November 18	Richmond	Williamsburg, VA	T 0–0	
November 30	vs. Hampden–Sydney	League Park; Norfolk, VA	L 0–9	
*Non-conference game
