= Thomas Sullivan (American football) =

American football player and coach (1892–1958)

Biographical details
- Born: September 14, 1892; Massena, New York, U.S.
- Died: November 30, 1958 (aged 66); Massena, New York, U.S.

Playing career

Football
- 1910–1913: Colgate
- Position: End

Coaching career (HC unless noted)

Football
- c. 1914: Colgate (assistant)
- 1915: Compton HS (CA)
- 1916: George Washington
- 1918: Camp Merritt (NJ)
- 1919–1920: Bates
- 1921: Colgate (ends)
- 1922: St. Lawrence (assistant)
- 1924: Clarkson (assistant)
- 1925–1937: St. Lawrence

Baseball
- 1925–1938: St. Lawrence

Head coaching record
- Overall: 57–47–9

Thomas Talbot Sullivan (September 14, 1892 – November 30, 1958) was an American football player and coach. He served as the head football coach at George Washington University in 1916, Bates College from 1919 to 1920, and St. Lawrence University from 1925 to 1937. Sullivan played college football as an end at Colgate University. He also coached baseball at St. Lawrence. Sullivan returned to his alma mater, Colgate, in 1921 as an assistant football coach under head coach Ellery Huntington Jr. He died on November 30, 1958, at Massena Memorial Hospital in Massena, New York, after suffering a heart attack.

== Head coaching record ==
=== Football ===
Year	Team	Overall	Conference	Standing	Bowl/playoffs
George Washington Hatchetites (Independent) (1916)
1916	George Washington	3–3–1			
George Washington:		3–3–1			
Bates Bobcats (Maine Intercollegiate Athletic Association) (1919–1920)
1919	Bates	1–4–1			
1920	Bates	2–4–1			
Bates:		3–8–2			
St. Lawrence Saints (New York State Conference) (1925–1937)
1925	St. Lawrence	6–0–1			
1926	St. Lawrence	4–2–1	2–1	4th	
1927	St. Lawrence	3–3–1			
1928	St. Lawrence	3–3	2–1	5th	
1929	St. Lawrence	4–3			
1930	St. Lawrence	4–3			
1931	St. Lawrence	5–2			
1932	St. Lawrence	2–4–1			
1933	St. Lawrence	4–2–1			
1934	St. Lawrence	4–3			
1935	St. Lawrence	6–2			
1936	St. Lawrence	2–4–1			
1937	St. Lawrence	4–4			
St. Lawrence:		51–36–6			
Total:		57–47–9			
