= 2002 Air Force Falcons football team =

American college football season

2002 Air Force Falcons football

San Francisco Bowl, L 13–20 vs. Virginia Tech
- Conference: Mountain West Conference
- Record: 8–5 (4–3 MW)
- Head coach: Fisher DeBerry (19th season)
- Offensive scheme: Wishbone triple option
- Defensive coordinator: Richard Bell (8th season)
- Base defense: 3–4
- Captains: Bryan Blew; Leotis Palmer; Tom Heier; Jeff Overstreet; Trevor Hightower; Anthony Schlegel
- Home stadium: Falcon Stadium

2002 Mountain West Conference football standings
	Conf.			Overall
Team	W		L	W		L
Colorado State $	6	–	1	10	–	4
New Mexico	5	–	2	7	–	7
Air Force	4	–	3	8	–	5
San Diego State	4	–	3	4	–	9
Utah	3	–	4	5	–	6
UNLV	3	–	4	5	–	7
BYU	2	–	5	5	–	7
Wyoming	1	–	6	2	–	10
$ – Conference champion; Rankings from AP Poll

The 2002 Air Force Falcons football team represented the United States Air Force Academy as a member of the Mountain West Conference (MW) during the 2002 NCAA Division I-A football season. Led by 19th-year head coach Fisher DeBerry, the Falcons compiled an overall record of 8–5 with a mark of 4–3 in conference play, tying for third place in the MW. Air Force was invited to the San Francisco Bowl, where the Falcons lost 20–13 to Virginia Tech. The team played home games at Falcon Stadium in Colorado Springs, Colorado

== Schedule ==
Date	Time	Opponent	Rank	Site	TV	Result	Attendance
August 31	10:00 a.m.	Northwestern*		Falcon Stadium; Colorado Springs, CO	ABC	W 52–3	45,114
September 7	1:00 p.m.	New Mexico		Falcon Stadium; Colorado Springs, CO	ESPN Plus	W 38–31 ^{OT}	36,620
September 21	3:00 p.m.	at No. 23 California*		California Memorial Stadium; Berkeley, CA		W 23–21	31,816
September 28	1:00 p.m.	at Utah		Rice–Eccles Stadium; Salt Lake City, UT	ESPN Plus	W 30–26	35,659
October 5	1:00 p.m.	Navy*		Falcon Stadium; Colorado Springs, CO (Commander-in-Chief's Trophy)		W 48–7	48,550
October 12	8:00 p.m.	BYU	No. 21	Falcon Stadium; Colorado Springs, CO	ESPN2	W 52–9	42,214
October 19	8:00 p.m.	No. 7 Notre Dame*	No. 18	Falcon Stadium; Colorado Springs, CO (rivalry, College GameDay)	ESPN	L 14–21	56,409
October 26	1:00 p.m.	at Wyoming	No. 22	War Memorial Stadium; Laramie, WY		L 26–34	15,022
October 31	5:30 p.m.	No. 24 Colorado State		Falcon Stadium; Colorado Springs, CO (rivalry)	ESPN	L 12–31	39,063
November 9	1:00 p.m.	at Army*		Michie Stadium; West Point, NY	ESPN+	W 49–30	39,288
November 16	1:00 p.m.	at UNLV		Sam Boyd Stadium; Whitney, NV	ESPN Plus	W 49–32	25,417
November 23	10:00 a.m.	San Diego State		Falcon Stadium; Colorado Springs, CO	ESPN2	L 34–38	31,023
December 31	8:30 p.m.	vs. No. 19 Virginia Tech*		Pacific Bell Park; San Francisco, CA (San Francisco Bowl)	ESPN2	L 13–20	25,966
*Non-conference game; Rankings from AP Poll released prior to the game; All times are in Mountain time

== Rankings ==
Ranking movements Legend: ██ Increase in ranking ██ Decrease in ranking — = Not ranked RV = Received votes
	Week																	
Poll	Pre	1	2	3	4	5	6	7	8	9	10	11	12	13	14	15	16	Final
AP	—	—	RV	RV	RV	RV	RV	21	18	22	RV	—	RV	RV	RV	RV	—	RV
Coaches	—	—	RV	RV	RV	RV	25	19	15	19	RV	RV	RV	RV	RV	RV	—	RV
BCS	Not released									—	—	—	—	—	—	—	—	Not released

== Roster ==
# Name Pos Ht Wt Yr Rk Hometown (High School)

- 1 Paul Mayo LC 5-10 180 Sr. C1C Kountze, Texas (Kountze)
- 2 Bryan Blew QB 5-11 190 Sr. C1C Edmond, Oklahoma (North)
- 3 Matt Ward HB 5-11 180 Fr. C4C Ft. Lauderdale, Florida (Stranahan)
- 4 Travis Thurmond QB 5-10 185 Jr. C2C Jacksonville, Florida (Bolles)
- 5 Charles Akinyemi RC 5-8 178 So. C3C Sugarland, Texas (Marine Military Academy)
- 6 Joel Kurzdorfer DB 5-11 190 So. C3C Warner Robins, Georgia (Houston County)
- 7 Nate Allen LC 5-10 180 So. C3C Converse, Texas (Judson)
- 8 Wes Crawley RC 6-0 190 Sr. C1C Sacramento, California (Elk Grove)
- 9 Leotis Palmer HB 5-8 175 Sr. C1C Darien, Georgia (McIntosh County Academy)
- 10 Joe Schieffer HB 5-10 185 Jr. C2C Indianola, Iowa (Indianola)
- 11 Chance Harridge QB 5-11 185 Jr. C2C Bonaire, Georgia (Houston County)
- 12 Overton Spence ILB 6-2 205 Fr. C4C Jacksonville, Florida (Jackson)
- 13 Brad Baca QB 5-11 195 So. C3C Pilot Point, Texas (Pilot Point)
- 14 Anthony Park WR 5-11 170 Jr. C2C Las Vegas, Nevada (Las Vegas)
- 15 Darnell Stephens HB 6-2 200 So. C3C Midwest City, Oklahoma (Midwest City)
- 16 John Welsh P 6-3 195 Sr. C1C Valdosta, Georgia (Lowndes)
- 17 Adrian Wright RF 6-0 215 Jr. C2C West Columbia, South Carolina (Lexington)
- 18 Eric Elsener QB 6-2 195 So. C3C Wadley, Georgia (Thomas Jefferson Academy)
- 19 Jordan Wilkie RC 5-11 170 So. C3C Eagan, Minnesota (Eagan)
- 20 Dan Shaffer FB 5-11 230 Jr. C2C Lakewood, Colorado (Green Mountain)
- 21 Joel Buelow RF 6-1 210 Sr. C1C Pulaski, Wisconsin (Pulaski)
- 22 Jeff Overstreet S 5-10 185 Jr. C2C Killeen, Texas (Ellison)
- 23 Cedric Adams FB 6-0 225 So. C3C O'Fallon, Illinois (O'Fallon Township)
- 24 Tom Heier HB 5-9 180 Sr. C1C Redmond, WA (Redmond)
- 25 Anthony Butler HB 5-9 195 So. C3C Newark, California (Gunn)
- 26 Don Clark HB 6-0 195 Sr. C1C Valparaíso, Indiana (Valparaíso)
- 27 Adam Cole FB 6-0 215 So. C3C Dallas, Texas (Richardson)
- 28 David Conley LC 5-11 185 So. C3C Mesa, Arizona (West Lake)
- 29 Larry Duncan S 5-10 200 Jr. C2C San Diego, California (Mira Mesa)
- 30 Kenny Smith ILB 6-2 225 So. C3C Kirtland, New Mexico (Kirtland Central)
- 31 John Taibi RF 6-2 210 So. C3C Englewood, Colorado (Cherry Creek)
- 32 Felix Cole RF 6-1 210 Jr. C2C Linden, Texas (Kildare)
- 33 Kris Holstege HB 5-9 175 So. C3C Caledonia, Michigan (South Christian)
- 34 Sean Rodgers LF 5-11 195 So. C3C Fuquay-Varina, North Carolina (Faquay-Varina)
- 35 Garrett Houck ILB 6-2 206 So. C3C Goshen, Kentucky (St. Xavier)
- 36 Tyler Hess S 5-11 186 So. C3C Canyon Lake, California (Elsinore)
- 37 Grant Mallory LF 5-9 180 So. C3C Aurora, Colorado (Smoky Hill)
- 38 Jon Hicks LE 6-2 260 Sr. C1C Los Angeles, California (North Hollywood)
- 39 Chikaodi Akalaonu ILB 6-0 212 Fr. C4C Hyrum, Utah (Mountain Crest)
- 40 Steve Massie FB 5-11 230 Jr. C2C Fairfax Station, Virginia (West Springfield)
- 42 Monty Coleman LE 6-2 245 Jr. C2C Phoenix, Arizona (Brophy Prep)
- 44 Trevor Hightower ILB 6-0 230 Jr. C2C Plano, Texas (Plano)
- 46 Tim Gehrsitz FB 5-9 220 So. C3C Belleview, Florida (Belleview)
- 47 Mark Marsh LF 5-11 205 So. C3C Fort Worth, Texas (Haltom)
- 48 John Rudzinski ILB 6-2 230 So. C3C Green Bay, Wisconsin (Notre Dame Academy)
- 49 Cameron Hodge ILB 6-2 225 So. C3C Parker, Colorado (Ponderosa)
- 50 John Peel LG 6-2 255 So. C3C San Antonio, Texas (Smithson Valley)
- 51 Anthony Schlegel ILB 6-2 245 So. C3C Highland Park, Texas (Highland Park)
- 52 Daniel Boyd OG 6-4 275 Sr. C1C Coram, New York (Newfield)
- 53 Ryan Carter LE 6-2 245 Jr. C3C Waterloo, Wisconsin (Edgewood)
- 55 Brian Lemay OC 6-1 260 So. C3C White Bear Lake, Minnesota (White Bear Lake)
- 56 Jon Wilson OC 6-4 281 Fr. C4C Tampa, Florida (Hillsborough)
- 58 Marchello Graddy ILB 6-1 235 Jr. C2C Wrightsville, Georgia (Johnson County)
- 59 Matt McCraney ILB 6-2 220 Sr. C1C Coppell, Texas (Coppell)
- 60 Cory Crossetti LG 6-3 275 Jr. C2C Wilmette, Illinois (Loyola Academy)
- 61 Blane Neufeld RT 6-5 280 Jr. C2C Inman, Kansas (Inman)
- 62 Vance Shaffer RG 6-3 280 So. C3C Houston, Texas (Alief Hasting)
- 63 Brett Huyser LG 6-4 295 Jr. C2C Rock Valley, Iowa (Community)
- 64 Ramon Young RT 6-2 270 So. C3C Denver, Colorado (Thomas Jefferson)
- 65 Scott Meyer RT 6-3 275 Sr. C1C Edina, Minnesota (Edina)
- 66 Stephen Maddox OC 6-2 260 Jr. C2C Carrollton, Georgia (Carrollton)
- 67 Brock Shepard LG 6-1 251 So. C3C Sugarland, Texas (Kempner)
- 68 Wayne Southam OC 6-2 255 Sr. C1C Aurora, Colorado (Overland)
- 69 Abe Leigh LG 6-5 275 So. C3C Arvada, Colorado (Arvada West)
- 70 Brian Jarratt RG 6-5 270 So. C3C Three Rivers, Texas (Three Rivers)
- 71 Jacob Anderson RG 6-5 275 So. C3C West Des Moines, Iowa (Valley)
- 72 Nathan Olsen LG 6-6 290 Sr. C1C Broomfield, Colorado (Broomfield)
- 74 Howard Turner RT 6-4 250 Jr. C2C Homestead, Florida (South Dade)
- 75 Jesse Underbakke RG 6-3 290 Jr. C2C Mabel, Minnesota (Mabel Canton)
- 76 Tyler Terrazone LT 6-4 255 Jr. C2C LaCrescenta, California (St. Francis)
- 77 Brett Waller LT 6-7 275 Jr. C2C Oak Harbor, WA (Oak Harbor)
- 79 Scott Diehl RT 6-6 270 Jr. C2C Springfield, Missouri (Kickapoo)
- 80 Ricky Amezaga WR 5-11 185 Sr. C1C Southlake, Texas (Grapevine)
- 81 Robert Barkers P 6-3 212 So. C3C Decatur, Georgia (Southwest Dekalb)
- 82 Alec Messerall WR 5-11 185 So. C3C Alexandria, Ohio (Northridge)
- 83 J.P. Waller WR 6-1 175 So. C3C Bryan, Texas (Bryan)
- 84 Chris Charron WR 6-2 185 So. C3C Grand Island, Nebraska (Northwest)
- 85 Zach Sasser PK 6-1 180 So. C3C Amarillo, Texas (Amarillo)
- 86 Adam Strecker TE 6-6 240 Jr. C2C Littleton, Colorado (Kent Denver)
- 87 Brock Predovitch TE 6-2 230 So. C3C Canon City, Colorado (Canon City Senior)
- 88 Russ Mitscherling NG 6-2 240 Fr. C4C Victoria, Texas (Memorial)
- 89 John Schwartz TE 6-2 235 Jr. C2C Pratt, Kansas (Pratt)
- 90 Charles Bueker RE 6-5 260 Jr. C2C Camarillo, California (Adolfo Camarillo)
- 91 Eric Thompson RE 6-3 260 Sr. C1C Woodland, Texas (Southlake Carroll)
- 92 Justin Wollcott LE 6-2 230 Fr. C4C Abilene, Texas (Abilene)
- 93 Michael Greenaway PK 5-10 175 So. C3C Culpeper, Virginia (Culpepper County)
- 94 Ricky Fry NG 6-3 255 So. C3C Yorba Linda, California (Esperanza)
- 95 Nicholas Taylor NG 6-4 265 Jr. C2C Cincinnati, Ohio (Turpin)
- 96 Brandon Conyers NG 6-0 245 So. C3C San Antonio, Texas (Macarthur)
- 97 Joey Ashcroft PK 6-0 210 Jr. C2C Springfield, Missouri (Glendale)
- 98 Todd Jolly TE 6-4 270 Jr. C2C Cherokee, Iowa (Washington)
- 99 Nathan Terrazone LE 6-3 230 So. C3C LaCrescenta, California (St. Francis)
