= 1916 All-Eastern football team =

American all-star college football team

The 1916 All-Eastern football team consists of American football players chosen by various selectors as the best players at each position among the Eastern colleges and universities during the 1916 college football season.

== All-Eastern selections ==
=== Quarterbacks ===
- Ockie Anderson, Colgate (AP-1)
- Jimmy DeHart, Pittsburgh (TM-1)
- Bagley, Washington & Jefferson (AP-2)

=== Halfbacks ===
- Elmer Oliphant, Army (AP-1; TM-1)
- Fritz Pollard, Brown (AP-1; TM-1)
- Andy Hastings, Pittsburgh (TM-2)
- Charles Hubbell, Colgate (TM-2)

=== Fullbacks ===
- Joe Berry, Penn (AP-1, TM-1)
- Harry LeGore, Yale (TM-2)

=== Ends ===
- George Clark Moseley, Yale (AP-1; TM-1)
- James P. Herron, Pittsburgh (AP-1; TM-1)
- Heinie Miller, Penn (TM-2)
- Bob Higgins, Penn State (TM-2)

=== Tackles ===
- William Lippard McLean, Princeton (AP-1)
- Belford West, Colgate (AP-1; TM-1)
- Lou Little, Penn (TM-1)
- Artemus Gates, Yale (TM-2)
- Pete Henry, Washington & Jefferson (TM-2)

=== Guards ===
- Clinton Black, Yale (AP-1; TM-1)
- Frank T. Hogg, Princeton (AP-1)
- Charles Henning, Penn (TM-1)
- Robert Lee Nourse, Princeton (TM-2)
- Harrie Dadmun, Harvard (TM-2)

=== Centers ===
- Bob Peck, Pittsburgh (AP-1; TM-1)
- John McEwan, Army (TM-2)

== Key ==
- AP = Associated Press
- TM = Tiny Maxwell

== See also ==
- 1916 College Football All-America Team
