= 1915 All-Eastern football team =

American all-star college football team

The 1915 All-Eastern football team consists of American football players chosen by various selectors as the best players at each position among the Eastern colleges and universities during the 1915 college football season.

== All-Eastern selections ==
=== Quarterbacks ===
- Charley Barrett, Cornell (RE-1)

=== Halfbacks ===
- Wilkinson, Syracuse (RE-1)
- Andy Hastings, Pittsburgh (RE-1)

=== Fullbacks ===
- Eddie Mahan, Harvard (RE-1)

=== Ends ===
- Ernest Soucy, Harvard (RE-1)
- Bob Higgins, Penn State (RE-1)

=== Tackles ===
- Joseph Gilman, Harvard (RE-1)
- Earl Abell, Colgate (RE-1)

=== Guards ===
- Clarence Spears, Dartmouth (RE-1)
- Harold White, Syracuse (RE-1)

=== Centers ===
- Bob Peck, Pittsburgh (RE-1)

== Key ==
- RE = Reading Eagle

== See also ==
- 1915 College Football All-America Team
