= Frank Hogg =

Frank Hogg may refer to:

- Frank Scott Hogg (1904–1951), Canadian astronomer
- Frank T. Hogg (1894–?), American football player
