= 1916 Pittsburgh Panthers football team =

American college football season

1916 Pittsburgh Panthers football
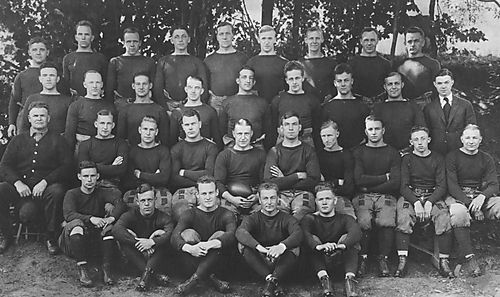

National champion (Billingsley MOV, Helms, Houlgate, NCF) Co-national championship (Davis)
- Conference: Independent
- Record: 8–0
- Head coach: Pop Warner (2nd season)
- Offensive scheme: Double wing
- Captain: Bob Peck
- Home stadium: Forbes Field

1916 Eastern college football independents records
	Conf.			Overall
Team	W	L	T	W		L		T
Army		–		9	–	0	–	0
Pittsburgh		–		8	–	0	–	0
Brown		–		8	–	1	–	0
Colgate		–		8	–	1	–	0
Yale		–		8	–	1	–	0
Fordham		–		6	–	1	–	1
Swarthmore		–		6	–	1	–	1
Penn State		–		8	–	2	–	0
Washington & Jefferson		–		8	–	2	–	0
Boston College		–		6	–	2	–	0
Cornell		–		6	–	2	–	0
Princeton		–		6	–	2	–	0
Lehigh		–		6	–	2	–	1
Dartmouth		–		5	–	2	–	2
Harvard		–		7	–	3	–	0
Penn		–		7	–	3	–	1
Temple		–		3	–	1	–	2
Tufts		–		5	–	3	–	0
Carnegie Tech		–		4	–	3	–	0
Rutgers		–		3	–	2	–	2
NYU		–		4	–	3	–	1
Syracuse		–		5	–	4	–	0
Holy Cross		–		4	–	5	–	0
Vermont		–		4	–	5	–	0
Rhode Island State		–		3	–	4	–	1
New Hampshire		–		3	–	5	–	2
Geneva		–		2	–	5	–	2
Carlisle		–		1	–	3	–	1
Lafayette		–		2	–	6	–	1
Bucknell		–		3	–	9	–	0
Columbia		–		1	–	5	–	2
Franklin & Marshall		–		1	–	7	–	0
Villanova		–		1	–	8	–	0

The 1916 Pittsburgh Panthers football team was an American football team represented the University of Pittsburgh as an independent during the 1916 college football season. Led by coach Pop Warner, the Panthers won all eight games and outscored their opponents by a total of 255 to 25. The team was retroactively selected as the national champion by multiple NCAA-designated major selectors, including the Billingsley Report (using its alternate "margin of victory" methodology), Helms Athletic Foundation, Houlgate System, and National Championship Foundation, and by others as a co-national champion with Army by Parke H. Davis.

The lone scare of the 1916 season occurred at Navy when, following a delay of the team's train heading to Annapolis that caused a late arrival, the team overcame several fumbles and eked out a 20–19 victory. The 1916 team was led by center Bob Peck, Pitt's first first-team All-American, and All-American end James Pat Herron, as well as All-Americans fullback Andy Hastings and guard "Tiny" Thornhill. Also on that team were Jock Sutherland and H.C. "Doc" Carlson who would go on to become perhaps Pitt's most legendary coaches in football and basketball, respectively. This Pitt Panthers football team was given the nickname "the greatest eleven in the world."

== Schedule ==
Date	Opponent	Site	Result	Attendance	Source
September 20	Buffalo	Forbes Field; Pittsburgh, PA	Cancelled		
October 7	Westminster (PA)	Forbes Field; Pittsburgh, PA	W 57–0	2,500	
October 14	at Navy	Worden Field; Annapolis, MD	W 20–19	4,000	
October 21	at Syracuse	Archbold Stadium; Syracuse, NY (rivalry)	W 30–0	12,000–15,000	
October 28	Penn	Forbes Field; Pittsburgh, PA	W 20–0	27,000–32,000	
November 4	Allegheny	Forbes Field; Pittsburgh, PA	W 46–0	1,500–2,500	
November 11	Washington & Jefferson	Forbes Field; Pittsburgh, PA	W 37–0	25,000	
November 18	Carnegie Tech	Forbes Field; Pittsburgh, PA	W 14–6	8,000	
November 30	Penn State	Forbes Field; Pittsburgh, PA (rivalry)	W 31–0	27,500	

== Preseason ==
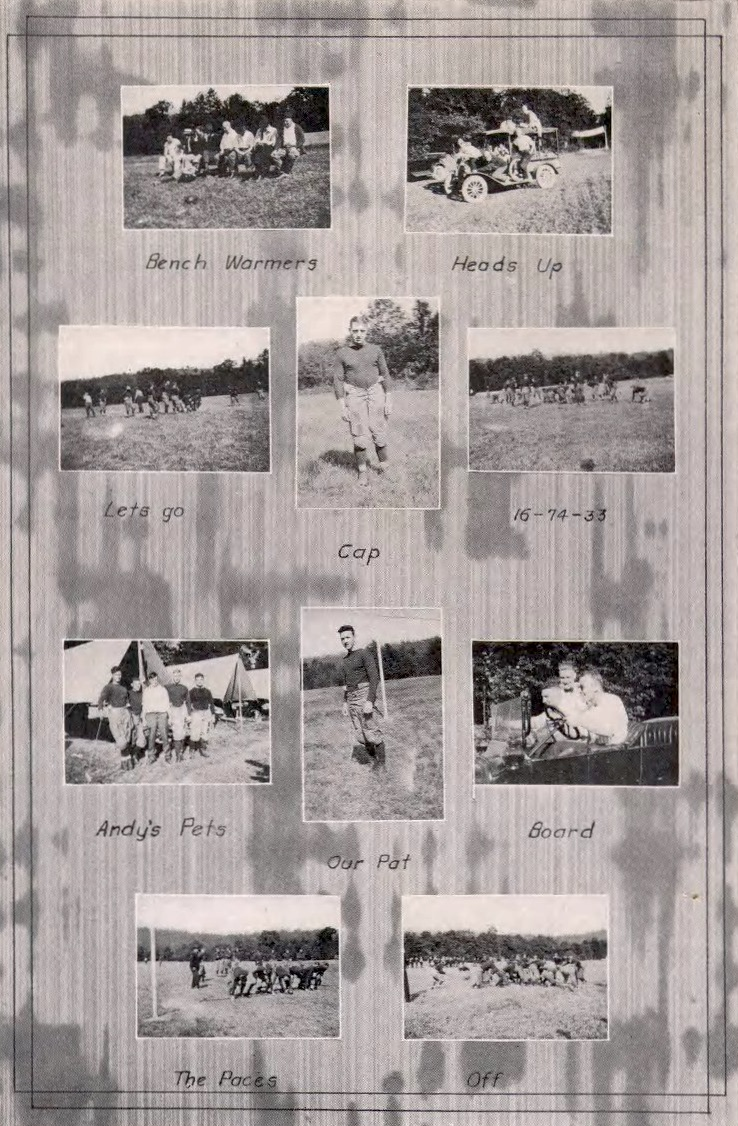
Fun at Camp Hamilton, fall 1916

Graduate manager Karl Davis finalized the schedule for 1916 by December 22, 1915. The schedule was a carbon copy of the 1915 slate except that Syracuse replaced Carlisle. In June, a home game against Buffalo on September 30 was added but never materialized, as The Pittsburg Press reported in late August: "The University of Buffalo team, scheduled to open the season against the varsity, has found it necessary to cancel the game."

Student manager John Thompson and his assistants began preparations at Camp Hamilton for preseason workouts during the last week of August.

"All work in connection with the camp will be done by students. Pitt boys will act as waiters, direct the transportation of camp supplies, do the laundry work and keep the big field in shape for scrimmage. Prof. G. W. Case of the Department of Sanitary Engineering superintended the installation of a complete sanitary system and has directed the construction of a new well-equipped trainer's room and additional shower baths. The water used at Camp Hamilton has been carefully tested by expert chemists at the University and has been found absolutely pure. The University's athletic authorities pride themselves on having done everything possible to make Camp Hamilton equal to the most comfortable and completely equipped training headquarters in the country."

On September 5, graduate manager John Thompson assembled the 30-odd aspirants for positions on the 1916 Pitt football roster at Union Station for the Pennsylvania Railroad trip to Windber, PA. In addition, the coach, the manager and his assistants; Dr. Moyer, the team physician; trainer, Hunter Johnston; and a corps of efficient workers were on board. "There are six men in the party this year who were not included in the group at Windber last year, while 11 huskies who formed part of Warner's contingent in 1915 are missing from this year's squad due to graduation, leaving school or other causes." All in all over forty men attended camp. On September 6, the second edition of Coach Warner's preseason camp commenced.

Richard Guy of The Gazette Times visited camp and reported: "After watching the candidates for the University of Pittsburgh football team go through a day's work out here, one is compelled to ask himself how the team, once it strikes its gait can help be anything but a winner." The daily routine – Rise at 6:30 a.m.; Breakfast at 7; Practice 10 to 11; Lunch at 12; Practice 3:30 to 4:45; Dinner at 6; Lights out at 10. Coach Warner was subdued in his assessment "All I hope for is that we have a team as good as last year. I cannot say I anticipate anything better, but if we reach our power of last season we ought to be satisfied. Our chances are bright but we must consider there are many things that can transpire between now and Thanksgiving." Camp lasted approximately two and a half weeks (September 6 – September 22) and the players left reluctantly, "for this is an ideal place to condition a team."

"The early season conditioning has been severe but a pleasant change just at the close of the stay at camp sent the men back to Pittsburgh feeling rather as though at least part of the trip had been simply a vacation. On Thursday evening a reception was held at camp in which about 30 girls from Johnstown, Windber and adjacent towns were the guests of the footballers. After a big corn roast, with wieners, ice cream and other staples on the side, a very enjoyable dance was held,. The hour at which the athletes are usually required to retire being advanced a little in consideration of the imminent departure."

After arriving back at school, the team registered for classes, had a weekend break and then began to practice at Forbes Field in preparation for the opening game against Westminster.

The University of Pittsburgh Athletic Council published a seventy-two page Seventh Annual Football Year Book as the game program, which sold for ten cents. The cover was illustrated by Andrew Brady McSwigan. Mr. McSwigan was president of Kennywood Amusement Park for 41 years.

== Coaching staff ==
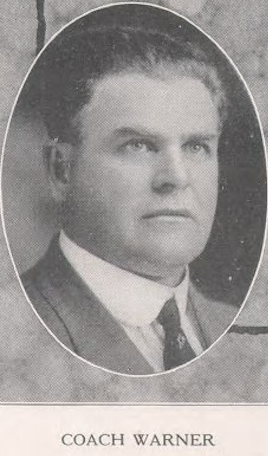
Glenn Warner

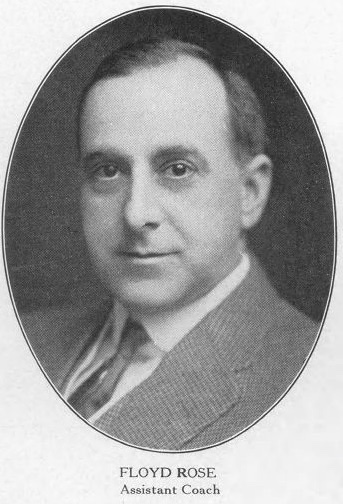
Floyd Rose

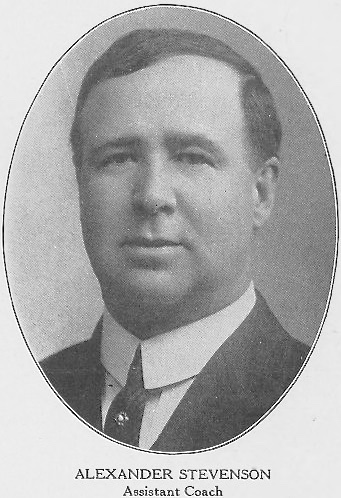
Alexander Stevenson

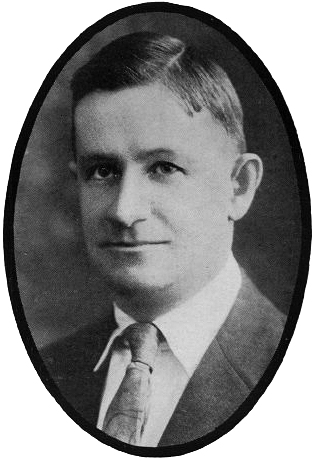
Andrew Kerr

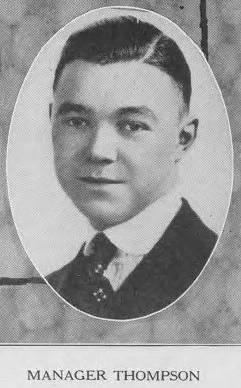
John A. Thompson

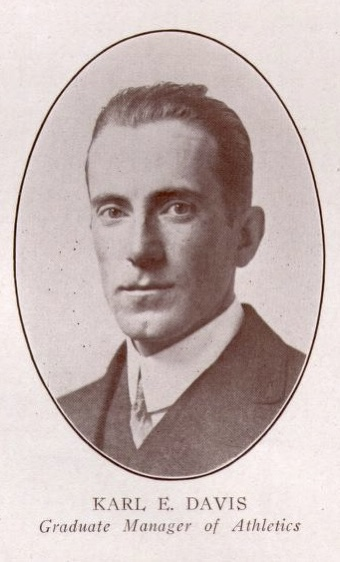
Karl E. Davis

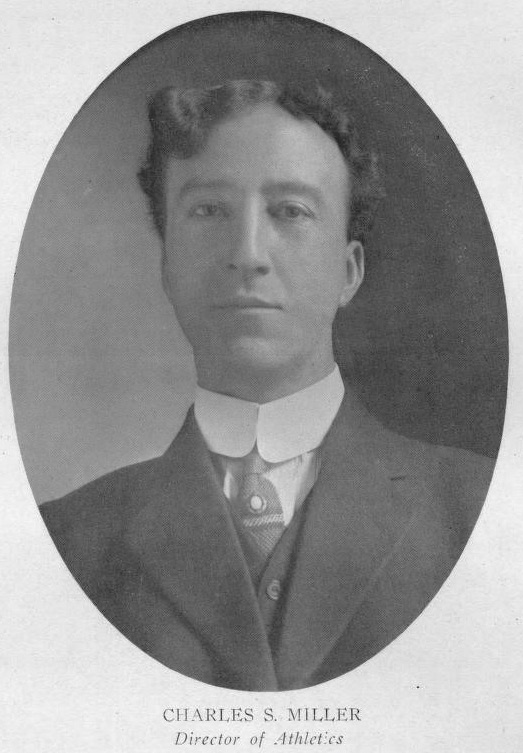
Charles S. Miller

1916 Pittsburgh Panthers football staff
Coaching staff: Glenn "Pop" Warner – head coach; Floyd Rose – assistant coach; Alexander Stevenson – assistant coach; Andrew Kerr – freshman coach	Support staff: John A. “Jack” Thompson – Student football manager; Karl E. Davis – Graduate manager of athletics; Charles S. Miller – Director of athletics

== Roster ==
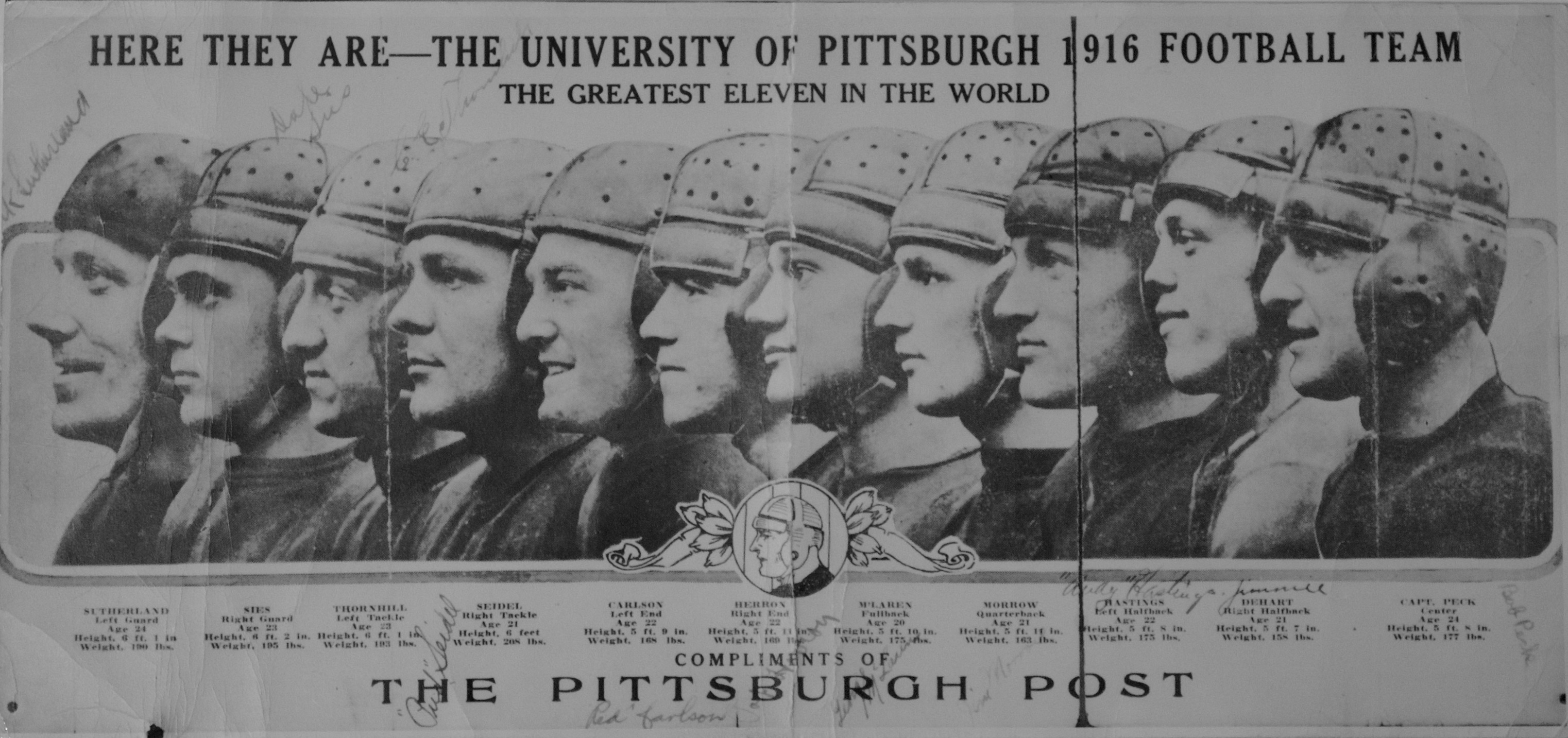
1916 National Champions

1916 Pittsburgh Panthers football roster
Player	Position	Games	Height	Weight	Class	Prep School	Degree	Residence
Bob Peck*	halfback	8	5' 8"	173	1917	Pawling School N.Y.	Economics	Lock Haven, PA
O. C. Ammons	end	2	5' 9"	144	1919	Arkansas City H. S.	Dental	Arkansas City, KS
Clifford V. Brown	center	2	5' 8"	160	1919	The Kiski School	Engineering	East Liverpool, OH
H. Clifford Carlson*	end	8	5' 10"	170	1918	Bellefonte Academy	Doctor of Dental Surgery	Fayette City, PA
Ralph N. Clicquennoi	tackle	0	6'	170	1918	Warren H.S.	Economics	Warren, PA
James DeHart*	halfback	8	5' 6"	150	1918	Reynoldsville H.S.	Associate College	Reynoldsville, PA
Roy A. Easterday	end/halfback	2	5' 8"	148	1919	Lisbon H. S. (Ohio)	Economics	Lisbon, OH
Frank E. Eckert	end	2	5' 8"	148	1919	Ridgway H. S.	Mines	Ridgway, PA
Sam Friedlander*	quarterback	3	5' 7"	149	1917	Greensburg H. S.	Dental	Greensburg, PA
Alvar H. Ginn	tackle	2	6' 2"	175	1919	Ben Avon H. S.	Associate College	Ben Avon, PA
Roscoe A. Gougler*	quarterback	8	5' 8"	156	1919	Harrisburg H. S.	College	Harrisburg, PA
William E. Harrington	end	0	5' 8"	155	1918	Conway Hall	Associate Economics	Bentlyville, PA
Andy Hastings*	halfback	6	5' 9"	170	1918	Brookville H.S.	Economics	Brookville, PA
George L. Heil	quarterback	0	5' 6"	134	1919	Topeka H. S. (KS)	Economics	Topeka, KS
James P. Herron*	end	8	5' 10"	135	1915	Monessen H.S.	Bachelor of Arts	Kent, OH
Leonard F. Hilty*	tackle	6	5' 10"	183	1918	Peabody H. S.	Economics	Pittsburgh, PA
Robert L. Johnston	guard	0	6' 1"	222	1919	California Normal	Economics	California, PA
Thomas R. Kendrick Jr.	center	3	5' 8"	178	1918	Duquesne H. S.	College	Duquesne, PA
William D. McClelland	fullback	3	5' 10"	161	1918	Pittsburgh Central H. S.	Economics	Pittsburgh, PA
James W. McIntyre	center	2	5' 7”	199	1919	Central H. S.	Education	Pittsburgh, PA
George W. McClaren*	fullback	7	5' 9"	174	1919	Peabody H.S.	Economics	Pittsburgh, PA
Frank B. McNulty*	halfback	6	5' 10"	146	1919	Mercersburg Academy	Economics	Carnegie, PA
Eric D. Meadows*	quarterback	5	5' 4"	140	1918	Pittsburgh Central H. S.	Engineering	Pittsburgh, PA
William H. Miller*	halfback	7	5' 7"	155	1918	Wyoming Seminary	Economics	Shenandoah, PA
John T. Morrow*	halfback	8	5' 9"	155	1919	Carnegie H.S.	Mines	Rennerdale, PA
R. P. Nicholls	halfback	1	5' 8"	153	1918	Donora H. S.	Bachelor of Science in Economics	Pittsburgh, PA
Fred A. Seidel*	tackle	8	5' 11"	197	1919	Bellefonte Academy	Economics	Hazelton, PA
Dale H. Sies*	fullback/tackle	8	6' 1"	195	1919	Davenport H. S. (IA)	College	Davenport, IA
Chester Smith	fullback	0	5' 10"	157	1919	State Normal School (Valley City, ND)	Education	Edgeley, ND
Randall Soppitt*	guard	2	6' 1"	185	1917	Greensburg H.S.	School of Mines	Latrobe, PA
Edward A. Stahl*	guard	7	5' 11"	184	1919	Bellefonte Academy	Economics	Scranton, PA
Harry A. Stahlman*	halfback	3	5' 2"	132	1917	Charleroi H. S.	Dental	Charleroi, PA
John B. Sutherland*	tackle	8	6' 2"	175	1917	Oberlin Academy	Doctor of Dental Surgery	Cooper Angus, Scotland
Claude E. Thornhill*	tackle	8	6' 0"	200	1917	Beaver H.S.	School of Mines	Beaver, PA
* Letterman

== Game summaries ==
=== Westminster ===
Week 1: Westminster at Pitt

Team	1	2	3	4	Total
Westminster	0	0	0	0	0
• Pitt	21	6	14	16	57

- Date: October 7, 1916
- Location: Forbes Field
  Pittsburgh, PA
- Game start: 3:00 p.m.
- Referee: Robert E. Cadigan (Syracuse)

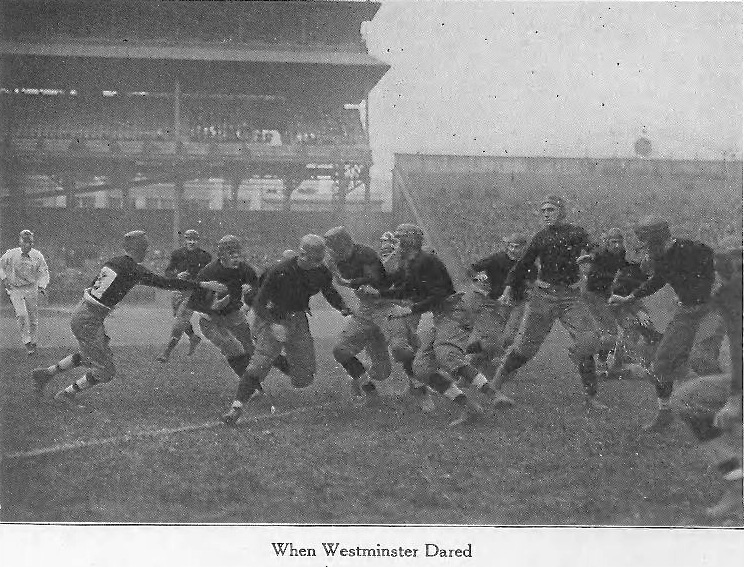
1916 Pitt defense stopping Westminster offense

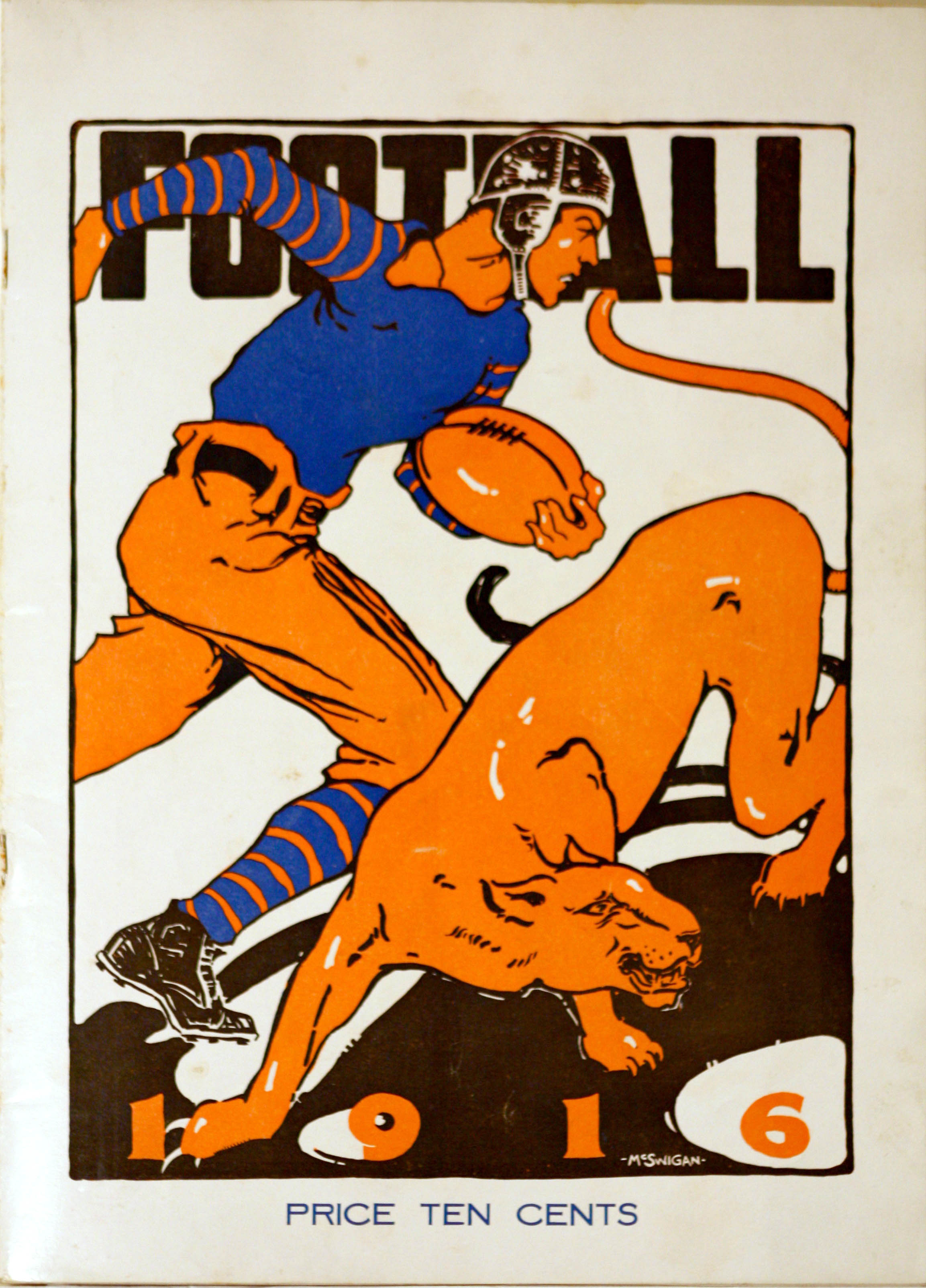
1916 University of Pittsburgh seventh annual football yearbook used for game programs

On Saturday October 7, Richard Guy of The Gazette Times prognosticated: "Pitt will open by playing Westminster. While the team from New Wilmington always puts up an aggressive article of football, it nevertheless does not stand much of a chance of winning today. Its only hope is in keeping down a score. Westminster has not been organized yet, while Pitt has a machine which needs oiling only to start it off at top speed."

The Pitt team was healthy. Coach Warner hoped to play his entire squad if possible so he could evaluate the personnel before two successive hard road games. This week he made an important change in the squad by moving Roy Easterday and Cliff Brown from halfback to end.

The Westminster Titans were led by second year coach Tuss McLaughry and sported a 0–1 record, having lost to Penn State by a score of 55 to 0. The Titans would finish the season with a 2–5–1 record.

"An extra feature of the Westminster fracas will be the reading of bulletins from the first world series baseball game, which will be received promptly at Forbes Field and megaphoned to the crowds. The Pitt student band will, as usual, furnish music before the game and between periods." The 1918 Owl Yearbook summarized the game best: "Pitt 57 - Westminster 0. In prying off the lid of the 1916 season, the Gold and Blue eleven swamped Westminster's gridders in a contest that was not much more than a stiff signal workout for the varsity. The Pitt attack was driving and almost irresistible. It showed eight touchdowns, six resultant goals and one field goal. Hastings, DeHart and McLaren advanced the ball at will, as did McNulty and Gougler, when the opportunity was given them. Many substitutions were made and every man played up to form. It was an auspicious start for Capt. 'Bob' Peck's boys."

Florent Gibson in his analysis of the game was the first reporter to mention the Pitt team as Panthers:

"They esteem themselves quite bloodthirsty and ferocious out at Pitt, and desirous of impressing the multitudes with the plenteousness of their ferocity, they've taken unto themselves the nom de guerre of Panthers, which they further emphasized yesterday by producing at Forbes Field something neat and nifty in the line of a scorecard, the back of which is embellished with the likeness of a Pitt gridder in heroic mood, right fist clenched and drawn back outside the picture, in company with a lithe, agile and muscular panther, clawed and toothed cap-a-pie. All done neatly in the traditional and conventional Blue and Gold. Hence-forth we will conform with their wishes and allude to them as Panthers."

The Pitt starting lineup for the game against Westminster was H. Clifford Carlson (left end), Claude Thornhill (left tackle), John Sutherland (left guard), Bob Peck (center), Randall Soppitt (right guard), Fred Seidel (right tackle), James Herron (right end), William Miller (quarterback), Andy Hastings (left halfback), James DeHart (right halfback) and George McLaren (fullback). Substitutes appearing in the game for Pitt included Eric Meadows, Roscoe Gougler, Sam Friedlander, Frank McNulty, Dale Sies, James Morrow, William McClelland, Clifford Brown, O. C. Ammons, Roy Easterday, Frank Eckert, Harry Stahlman, Leonard Hilty, Alvar Ginn, James McIntyre, Edward Stahl, Thomas Kendrick. The game was played in 12-minute quarters.

=== At Navy ===
Week 2: Pitt at Navy

Team	1	2	3	4	Total
• Pitt	7	7	6	0	20
Navy	6	0	7	6	19

- Date: October 14, 1916
- Location: Worden Field
  Annapolis, MD
- Game start: 2:30 p.m.
- Referee: J. A. Evans (Williams)

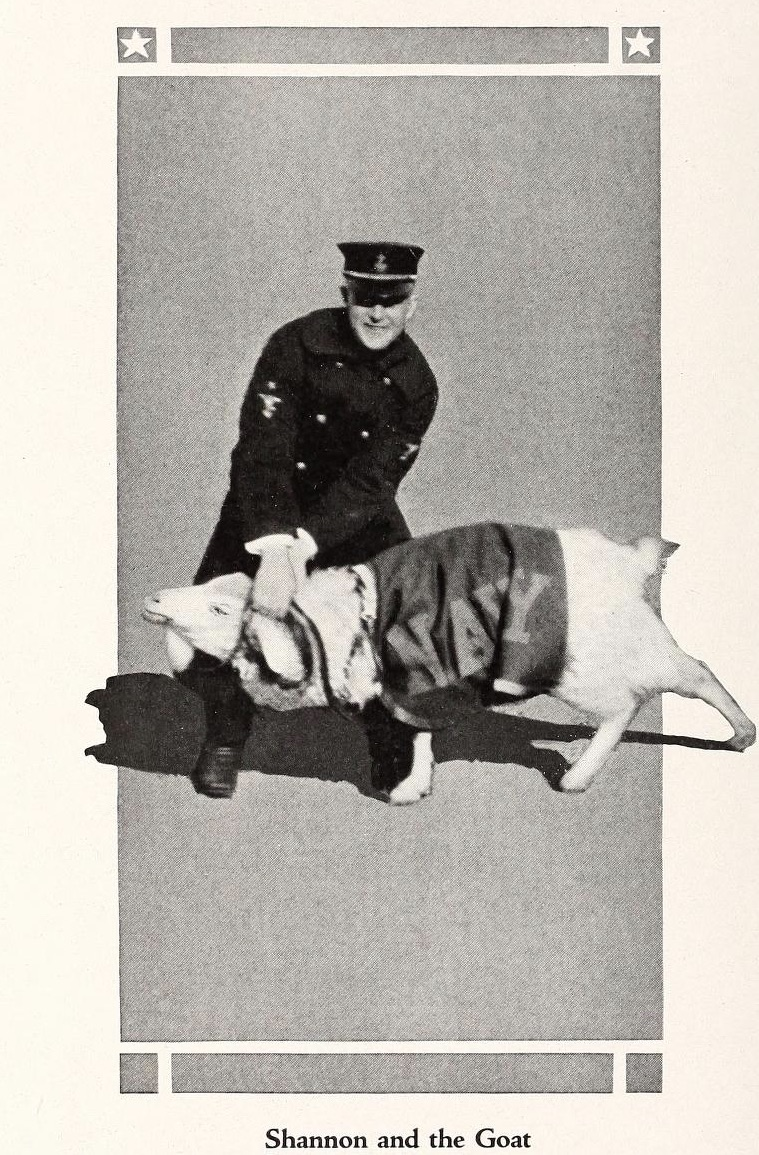
The Navy mascot - 1916

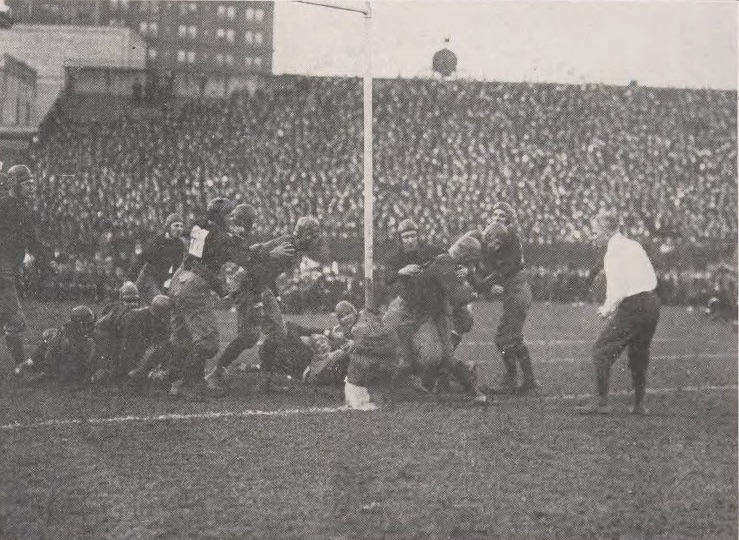
1916 University of Pittsburgh football game action

The first road game of the 1916 season was to Annapolis, Maryland to do battle with the Midshipmen of the Naval Academy. Navy was led by second-year coach Jonas H. Ingram and came into the Pitt game with a 2–0–1 record.

"Coach Warner, Manager Thompson and Capt. Peck left at 11:10 Friday night (October 13) in charge of a party of 23 players accompanied by alumni and other friends of the team. The arrival at Annapolis is scheduled for 8:30 a.m., giving the players a few hours rest before the game, which begins at 2:30." However, "The engine cab took fire 40 miles north of Baltimore and during the delay while the engine men were putting out the fire the members of the team left the train for a little workout. The Maryland fields furnished them with a delightful playground. After a long wait, all boarded the train at the call of the conductor and the train continued on its way." The team arrived three hours late, but "every member of the Pitt team is in the finest physical condition."

The 1918 Owl Yearbook recap refuted the above assessment: "Arriving at Annapolis only a few hours before game time, Pitt displayed poor form against the Middies and just managed to win by a single point. The long hours spent on the delayed train without breakfast had its effect on the team, as was shown by the excessive fumbling. Despite the closeness of the score, Pitt's play was far superior to that of Navy."

Richard Guy of the Post-Gazette reported: "Pitt defeated the Navy this afternoon, 20 to 19, in a football game that was characterized by errors of omission and commission on the part of the Pittsburghers. That the Midshipmen did not win was not the fault of Coach Warner's pupils, for they seemed to be bent upon handing the annual affair to Uncle Sam's future admirals."

For Pitt, Andy Hastings, George McLaren and James DeHart scored touchdowns. Hastings kicked two goals after. "Pitt's scoring was the result of taking the ball down the field on straight football tactics. It was purely a case of earning everything it got, while Navy's touchdowns were handed to them."

The Baltimore Sun noted: "The Middies drew first blood early in the opening period when (Eric) Meadows fumbled a punt on his own five yard line. Jackson recovered for Navy and darted across the goal line. The try for goal failed." Pitt then proceeded to advance the ball down the field and Hastings' touchdown tied the game. He was successful on the goal after to put Pitt ahead 7–6 at the end of the first quarter. George McLaren scored his touchdown in the second quarter and Hastings again added the point after to make the score 14–6 at halftime.

Early in the third quarter, "a 48 yard sprint by Welcher after receiving one of Hastings' punts was a hair-raising incident. He finally was tackled inside of Pittsburgh's five-yard line. Three line plunges and Ingram shot through the visitor's left side for a touchdown." Holtman kicked the goal and Pitt led 14 to 13. Pitt again retaliated with a long drive. It ended when "McLaren double passed to DeHart, who went around the Navy right flank for touchdown. Hastings missed goal." Pitt led 20 to 13.

Late in the fourth quarter, Davis of Navy recovered a Pitt fumble on the Pitt 20-yard line. "The Middies came through with a touchdown as the result of the forward pass from Hanafee to Welcher that caught the Pitt boys napping. The Navy rooters literally held their breath as Holtman steadied himself for the try at goal and there was keen dismay when his toe proved untrue." Final score Pitt 20 to Navy 19. The Midshipmen finished the season with a 6–3–1 record.

The Pitt lineup for the game against Navy was James Herron (left end), Claude Thornhill (left tackle), John Sutherland (left guard), Bob Peck (center), Randall Soppitt and Dale Sies (right guard), Fred Seidel and Leonard Hilty (right tackle), H. Clifford Carlson (right end), Eric Meadows and William Miller (quarterback), Andy Hastings and Roscoe Gougler (left halfback), James DeHart and Frank McNulty (right halfback), George McLaren and James Morrow (fullback). The game was played in 15-minute quarters. "It was a costly win for Pitt inasmuch as Randall Soppitt was injured and out for the season."

=== At Syracuse ===
Week 3: Pitt at Syracuse

Team	1	2	3	4	Total
• Pitt	7	9	7	7	30
Syracuse	0	0	0	0	0

- Date: October 21, 1916
- Location: Archbold Stadium
  Syracuse, NY
- Game start: 2:30 p.m.
- Referee: Nathan A. Tufts (Brown)

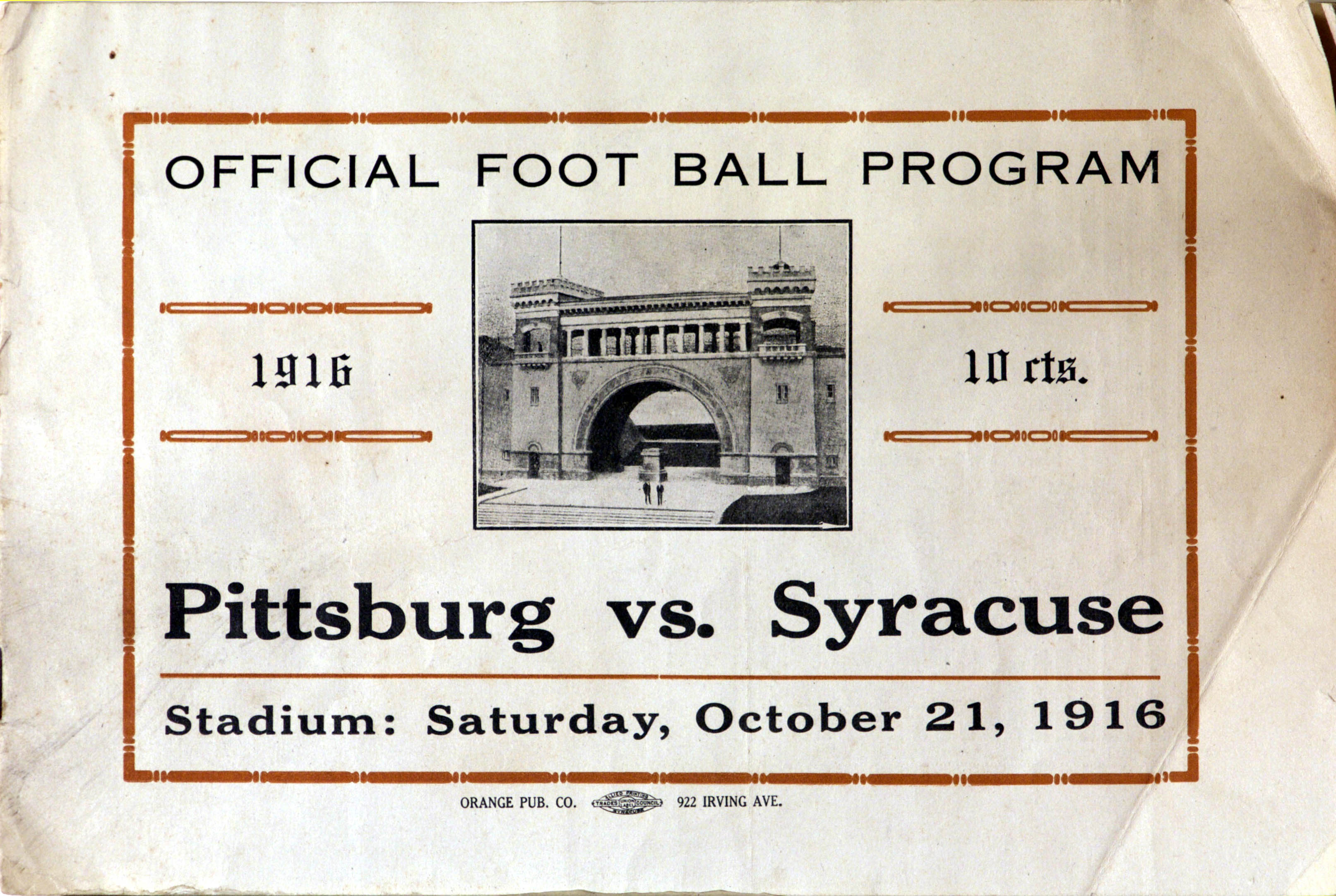
Syracuse Game Day Program

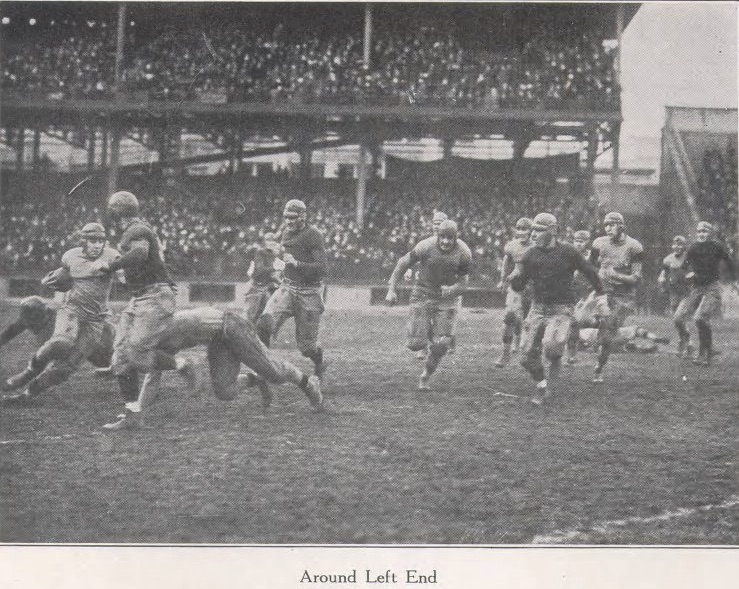
1916 Pitt football game action

On October 21 Pitt traveled to Syracuse, NY to play the Syracuse Orangemen for the first time. Syracuse finished the 1915 season with a 9–1–2 record and were presently 3–0 in 1916 under first year coach Bill Hollenback.

"Pitt's football squad will leave on Friday morning for Syracuse, the schedule bringing them into the New York State town about 8 o'clock that evening. This will enable the wearers of the Blue and Gold, after a good night's rest, to try out the stadium on Saturday morning. The eleven will be further cheered through the game by the presence of the 30-piece student band, which is to make the trip. Pitt's cheerleader and band will make their appearance in the tasty new uniforms, those of the yellmasters being the gift of the athletic committee, while the band was equipped through the generosity of two trustees of the university, E. V. Bobcock and Howard Heinz."

Richard Guy of The Gazette Times reported that Coach Warner would start James Morrow at quarterback for the Syracuse game and that (George)"McLaren, who was badly shaken up in the game at Annapolis, reports himself in shape. Dale Sies will play Soppitt's guard."

The Binghamton Press was impressed with Pitt: "Hastings and McLaren of Pittsburgh tore so many holes in the Syracuse eleven here Saturday that Captain Peck's visiting eleven had little trouble defeating the heavy farmers in Syracuse Stadium by the score of 30 to 0. It was the most disappointing demonstration of home inefficiency which Syracuse has exhibited in several years. The visitors outplayed, outbucked, outran and outtackled the local eleven, and really could have scored several more touchdowns. Upwards of 15,000 spectators sat through the contest, but only an few hundred (Pitt fans) really enjoyed the affair."

Richard Guy of The Gazette Times agreed: "The Pitt football team rose in its power this afternoon and smote the haughty and valiant Syracuse hosts a crushing 30 to 0 defeat in the presence of 10,000 persons in the stadium here. It was a different Pitt team that went out this afternoon to do battle with the Orange compared with that which played the Navy last Saturday. The team which Capt. Bob Peck led on the stadium field to meet Syracuse for the first time in their gridiron history was determined, and five minutes after the play was underway Syracuse was beaten."

The Pittsburgh Press was blunt: "Mowing down the much-touted defense of the ponderous University of Syracuse football eleven, the University of Pittsburgh gridiron warriors this afternoon vanquished the local team and completely outclassed them, never allowing them to appear dangerous. The score, Pitt 30, Syracuse 0, tells how the Pitt boys fairly made the local giants look like fondled pets."

On Pitt's second possession they advanced the ball inside the Syracuse five yard line and fullback "McLaren went through for a touchdown. Hastings kicked goal." Early in the second quarter, Pitt had the ball on Syracuse's seven yard line. "Hastings, at right guard, went through for a touchdown. Hastings missed goal." Pitt led 13 to 0. On Pitt's next possession, "James Herron intercepted a forward pass and went from the 50 to the 25-yard line." Four plays later, "standing on the 21-yard line, Hastings kicked a field goal. Score: Pitt 16, Syracuse 0."

In the third quarter, "Pitt received the ball on its 10-yard line and made an uninterrupted procession to a score." James DeHart slipped through left guard from the 5-yard line for the touchdown. "Hastings kicked the goal. Score: Pitt 23, Syracuse 0." Pitt had possession of the ball on Syracuse's 43-yard line to start the fourth period. Eight running plays later from the 2-yard line, James "Morrow bucked the line for a touchdown and was laid out on the play. Hastings kicked the goal. Score: Pitt 30, Syracuse 0." The statistics emphasize how dominating the Pitt machine performed. "In the first half, Pitt gained 146 yards and 10 first downs; Syracuse had 11 yards and 1 first down. In the second half, Pitt had 183 yards and 10 first downs against 18 yards and 1 first down. For the game, Pitt outgained Syracuse 329 yards to 29." Syracuse finished the season with a 5–4 record.

The Pittsburgh Press reported: "Walter Camp arrived this morning to witness the game because it was regarded as the most important struggle on today's card. "Marvelous," said the distinguished authority on one occasion when he saw the team crashing through the Syracuse defense. "The team play is perfect. They are a most wonderful machine. Pitt is a marvelous combination." It is expected that his visit will have an important bearing on the choice of an All-American team."

The Pitt lineup for the game against Syracuse was H. Clifford Carlson (left end), Claude Thornhill (left tackle), John Sutherland (left guard), Bob Peck (center), Dale Sies and Edward Stahl (right guard), Fred Seidel and Leonard Hilty (right tackle), James Herron (right end), James Morrow and Frank McNulty (quarterback), Andy Hastings and Roscoe Gougler (left halfback), James DeHart and Eric Meadows (right halfback), and George McLaren (fullback). The game was played in 15-minute quarters.

=== Penn ===
Week 4: Penn at Pitt

Team	1	2	3	4	Total
Penn	0	0	0	0	0
• Pitt	3	10	0	7	20

- Date: October 28, 1916
- Location: Forbes Field
  Pittsburgh, PA
- Game start: 3:00 p.m.
- Referee: Bob “Tiny” Maxwell (Swarthmore)

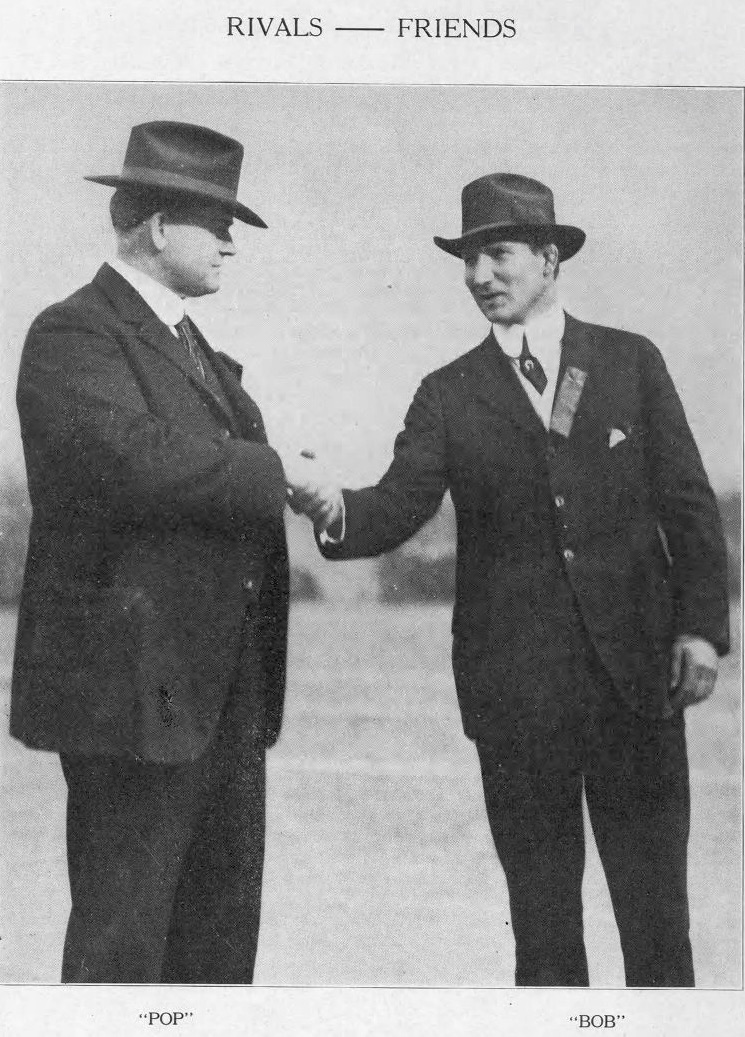
Pop Warner and Bob Folwell pregame handshake, 1916 Pitt vs. Penn game

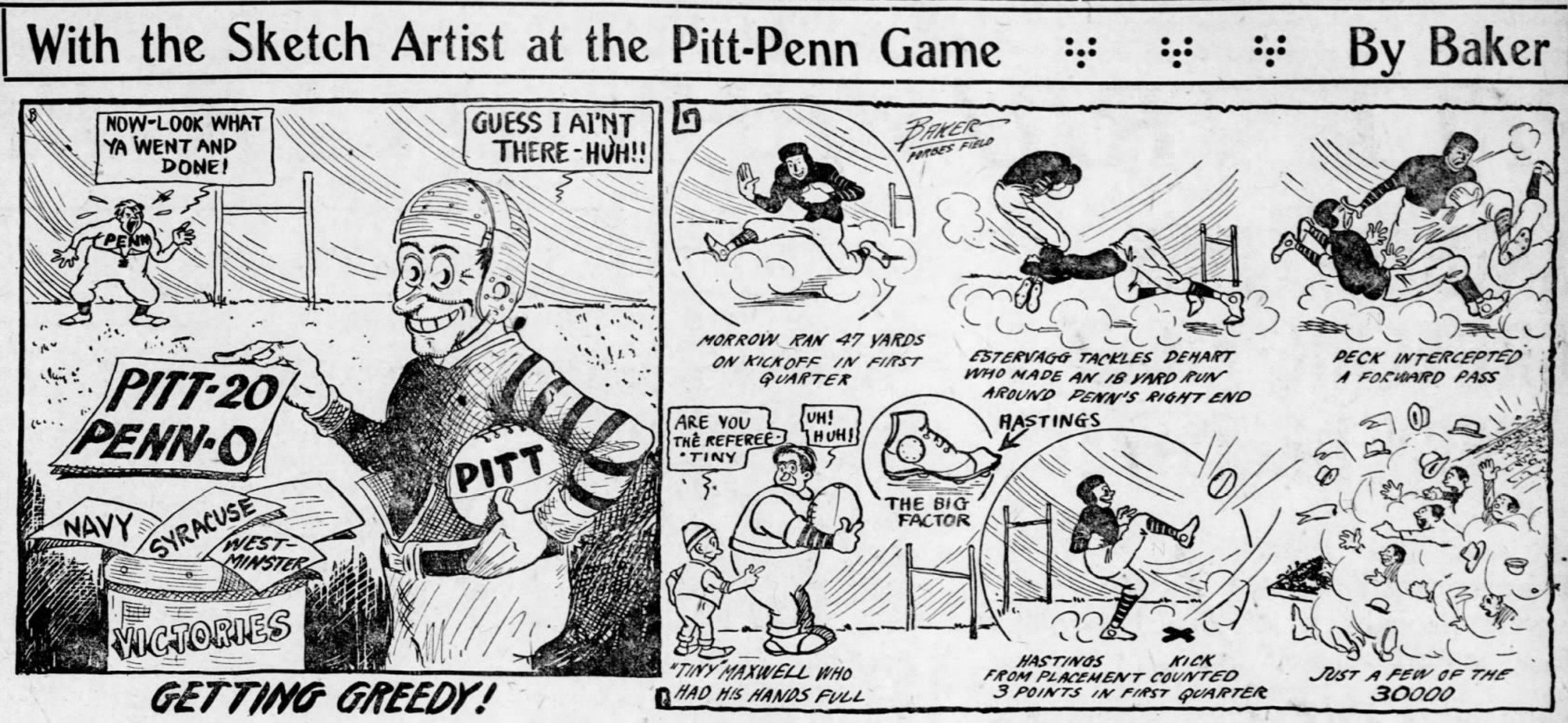
Cartoonist's description of 1916 Pitt vs. Pennsylvania game

The fourth opponent for the 1916 season was the University of Pennsylvania Quakers led by first year coach Bob Folwell. The Quakers sported a record of 3–1, having lost to Swarthmore 6–0, but beating Penn State, West Virginia and Franklin & Marshall.

Earlier in the week, The Gazette Times reported that Coach Warner's contract was extended through the 1920 season. "The fact that since Warner took charge of the football squad over a year ago not a single game has been lost is in itself ample cause for this action on the part of the Pitt athletic committee, but there is something more back of the action. They believe that Glenn Warner is not only the ablest and most efficient coach in the country, but that his influence upon the men he coaches and the student body generally is something the value of which cannot be estimated. The demand that Coach Warner be retained as long as possible came to the athletic committee from students and alumni alike; it was unanimous."

The Philadelphia Inquirer described the team send-off: "With the cheers of more than five thousand loyal students echoing in their ears, twenty-five members of the Pennsylvania Varsity football team departed last night for Pittsburgh, where they will do battle with the University of Pittsburgh eleven tomorrow afternoon on Forbes Field. The spectacle of the mob of madly cheering students in the train shed of Broad Street Station just prior to the leaving of the Red and Blue squad of gridironers was the greatest witnessed in this city for many a year. In fact, the demonstration given by undergraduates from the training house; the conveying of the players and coaches in a big bus pulled by freshmen to Broad Street Station, the snake dance, the singing of songs and the speeches, has been equaled only once in the history of Old Penn, that being some eleven years ago, when Penn was represented by an unbeatable eleven."

Both teams were healthy as Ralph Davis of The Pittsburgh Press reported: "Pitt took the field today with the same lineup which defeated Syracuse a week ago. Penn had practically the same lineup which defeated State."

The Philadelphia Inquirer sporting editor was not amused after the game: "Pennsylvania's hopeful football team was outclassed, crumpled and beaten by the score of 20 to 0 this afternoon on Forbes Field by the gridiron warriors of the University of Pittsburgh. To tell of the rout of the resplendent Red and Blue team it is only necessary to say that the Pitt husky battlers scored a goal from the field in the first period of the game and another in the second, the quarter in which they added a touchdown. In the third period even the mighty Smoky City men could not score, in which the fiercest of the fighting was done, but in the fourth and last period the Blue and Gold clan forced the ball once more over Penn's goal line and brought their score up to 20 points. And when the Pitt score topped Penn's by 12 points the Pittsburgh supporters were enriched by several thousand dollars."

W. B. McVicker of The Pittsburgh Press praised the game of Andy Hastings and James DeHart: "Hastings tallied the most points for Pitt, scoring 14 of the 20 points annexed by the Panthers. It was Hastings who booted a goal from placement in the first quarter thus scoring a field goal. It was Hastings who tallied again in the second quarter in the same fashion and Hastings who crossed the coveted chalk mark in the last period with the pigskin tucked safely beneath his arm for Pitt's last score. Andy also kicked the goals following his own and DeHart's touchdowns. ...DeHart, the Panthers' wonderful halfback, contributed the most sensational features of the struggle. Time after time, the monstrous crowd was brought to its feet by some thrilling run by DeHart, and when the whistle announced the close of hostilities, this star had covered himself with glory."

Richard Guy of the Post-Gazette praised the coaches: "It was another battle between those two master minds of football, Coaches Glenn Warner and Bob Folwell, and the sweet taste of victory belongs to the Pittsburgh mentor because his men showed the superior offensive line strength and better interference."

Coach Folwell credited his opponents: "Pop Warner has the best team that ever played football and deserves a lot of credit for such a wonderful exhibition as his boys showed us today. Man for man no team in the country can compare with this year's Pitt team. There is no luck in football, you have to play the game to win and that's what Warner's boys did today. It was a wonderful game of football and Warner is to be congratulated."

The Pitt lineup for the game against Penn was H. Clifford Carlson (left end), Claude Thornhill and H. Austin Stahlman (left tackle), John Sutherland (left guard), Bob Peck and Thomas Kendrick (center), Dale Sies (right guard), Fred Seidel and Leonard Hilty (right tackle), James Herron (right end), James Morrow and William Miller (quarterback), Andy Hastings and Roscoe Goughler (left halfback), James DeHart, Frank McNulty and Eric Meadows (right halfback) and George McLaren (fullback). The game was played in 15-minute quarters.

=== Allegheny ===
Week 5: Allegheny at Pitt

Team	1	2	3	4	Total
Allegheny	0	0	0	0	0
• Pitt	6	20	7	13	46

- Date: November 4, 1916
- Location: Forbes Field
  Pittsburgh, PA
- Referee: William F. Knox (Yale)

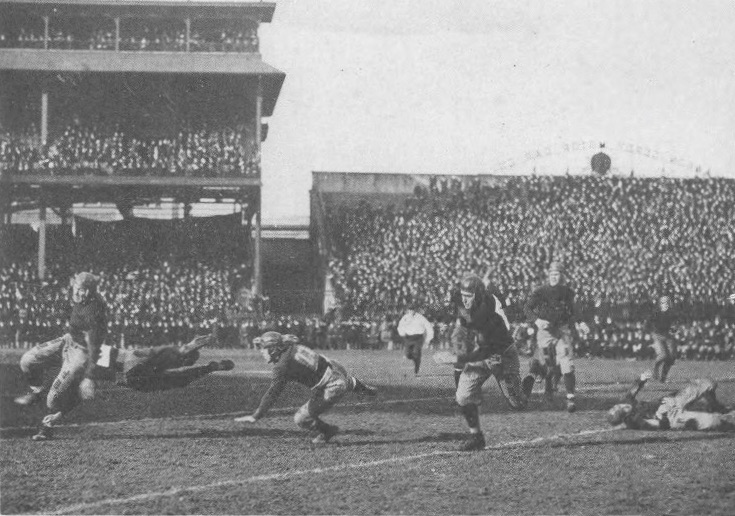
1916 Pitt football game action

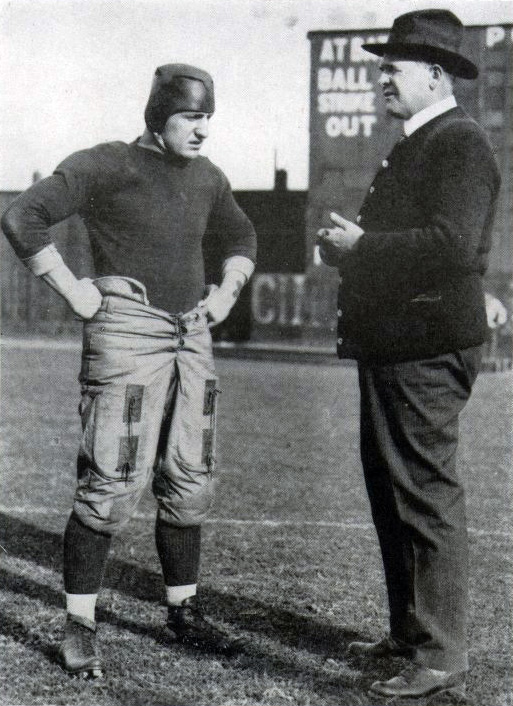
Hall of fame head football coach Pop Warner (right) with three-time All-American and team captain Bob Peck during the 1916 national championship season

The Allegheny Methodists led by fourth year coach Charles E. Hammett were next on the schedule and arrived in town with a 2–1–1 record. Their only loss occurred on their October 21 visit to Pittsburgh against Carnegie Tech. "The Alleghenians are in much better condition than at any time this season, and while Coach Hammett realizes that his men have but a faint prospect of victory over the Warnerites, he predicted they would surprise spectators by their showing against the conquerors of Penn. The Panthers are in pretty good shape too."

“This game was the concluding event of Pittsburgh's Charter Centennial celebration. Two hundred boys from the Kingsley settlement house attended the struggle as guests of Pitt management. This arrangement was made through Ian Forbes, president of the Y. M. C. A. at the University, who is at present connected with the Kingsley House work. Mr. Forbes is a member of the varsity wrestling team.”

W. B. McVicker of The Pittsburgh Press reported: "As a cat plays with a mouse, so did the Panther eleven toy with the Allegheny College grid team yesterday on Forbes Field, but the “killing” was finally accomplished after Pitt had tallied 46 points and held her Meadville opponents scoreless." The rain prior to kickoff kept the attendance low. "The Panther band was on the job, however, and made up for the lack of enthusiasm of the student body. The game was played on a field, one-half of which was muddy, and the other half muddier."

The Pittsburgh Gazette Times noted: "Pitt started its regular lineup except that Bill McClelland was at fullback instead of (George) McLaren, who is nursing a bruised hip. (Andy) Hastings, who has a bad ankle, was removed from the game in the first period and (Roscoe) Gougler took his place." Gougler took advantage of the opportunity and scored three touchdowns in the second quarter. "One run of 62 yards for touchdown after catching a punt was a thrilling piece of work. He took the kick near the west side lines, one foot being but inches from the line. He then swung to the right and cut across the field and outran the left side of the Allegheny team. His speed in the mud was remarkable."

The second string played the third quarter with William Miller contributing a touchdown. Sam Friedlander, another benchwarmer, scored on an 11-yard double pass play early in the fourth quarter. James DeHart added two touchdowns, a one-yard plunge in the first period and a six-yard pass reception in the final stanza. Pitt converted four goal kicks to run the tally the 46. "Allegheny sent a weak team on the field, its defense being unable to cope with the Pitt attack, and its offense was on a plane with the attack."

The 1918 Owl Yearbook recapped: "Allegheny's sensational aerial attack of a year ago was missing and Pitt had no trouble in trouncing the Methodists on a very muddy field..... It was pre-eminently the reserves' day, Gougler and Friedlander starring on the offense. Coach Warner was at Ithaca watching Cornell play (Carnegie) Tech."

The Pitt starting lineup for the game against Allegheny was H. Clifford Carlson (left end), Claude Thornhill (left tackle), John Sutherland (left guard), Bob Peck (center), Dale Sies (right guard), Fred Seidel (right tackle), James Herron (right end), James Morrow (quarterback), Andy Hastings (left halfback), James DeHart (right halfback) and William McClelland (fullback). Substitutes appearing in the game for Pitt included Roscoe Gougler, Sam Friedlander, Eric Meadows, H. Austin Stahlman, William Miller, Clifford Brown, O. C. Ammons, Roy Easterday, Frank Eckert, Edward Stahl, R. P. Nicholls, James McIntyre, Thomas Kendrick, Alvar Ginn, and Leonard Hilty. The game was played in 12, 10, 12, and 10-minute quarters.

=== Washington & Jefferson ===
Week 6: Washington & Jefferson at Pitt

Team	1	2	3	4	Total
W. & J.	0	0	0	0	0
• Pitt	7	9	21	0	37

- Date: November 11, 1916
- Location: Forbes Field
  Pittsburgh, PA
- Game start: 2:30 p.m.
- Game attendance: 25,000
- Referee: James H. Moffatt (Princeton)

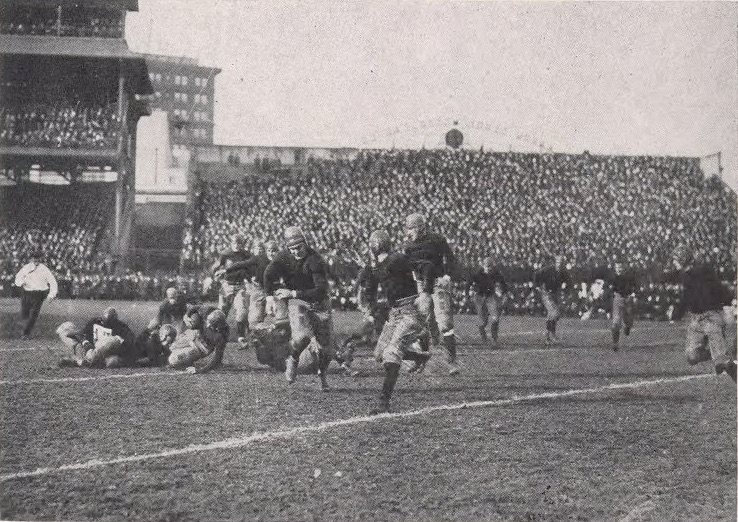
The ninety-yard Pitt drive in the 1916 W. & J. game

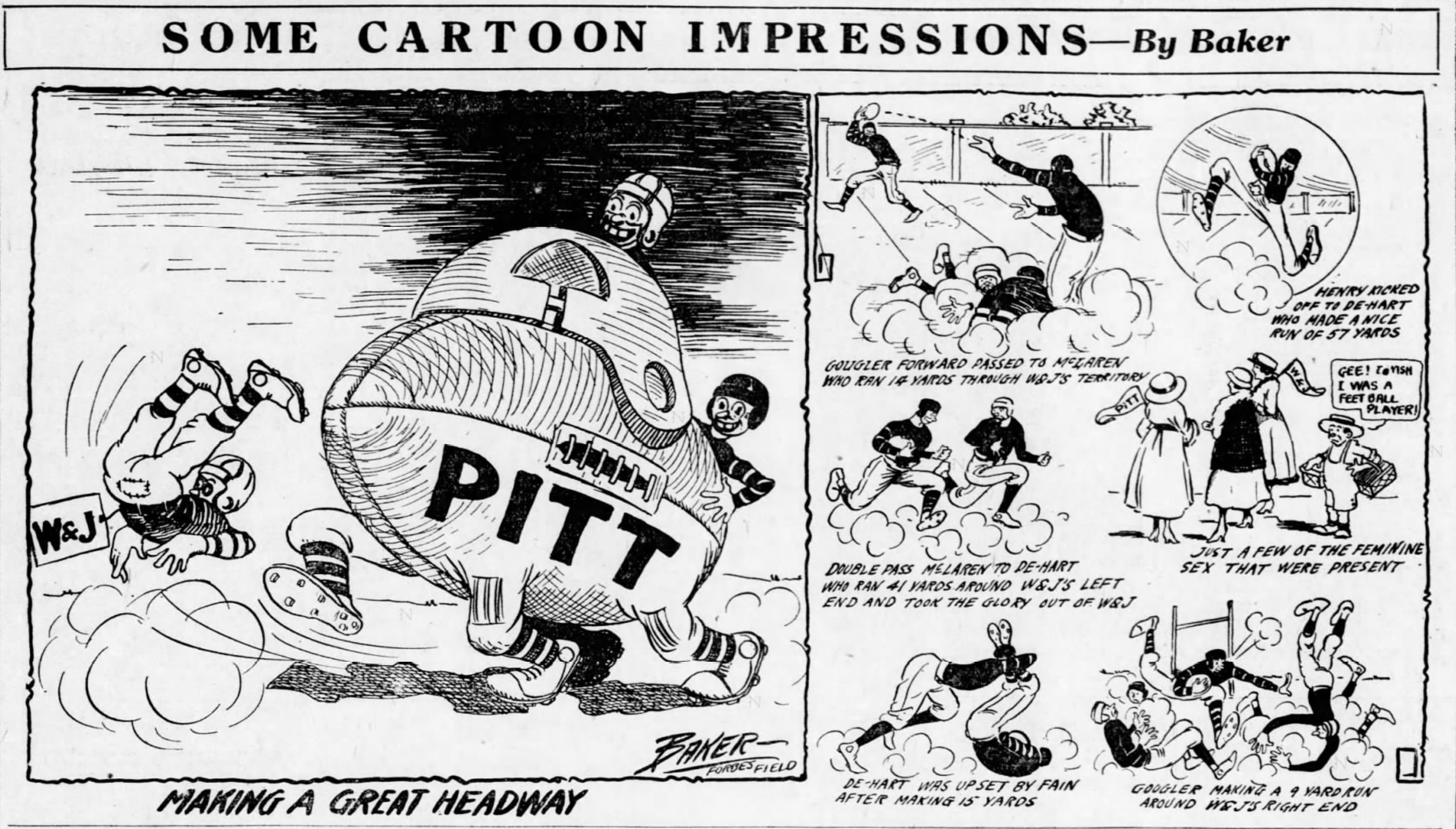
Cartoonist's 1916 Pitt vs. W. & J. recap

When head coach Bob Folwell left W. & J. for the University of Pennsylvania, the Red and Black hired Penn graduate Sol Metzger. Metzger previously coached at Baylor, Penn and West Virginia. His 1908 Penn team was undefeated and retroactively named national champs. The 1916 Red and Black came into the game with a 5–1 record, having lost to Yale the previous Saturday 36–14. Wash-Jeff would finish the season with an 8–2 record.

The Pittsburg Press noted Coach Metzger's confidence: "My boys may hand Pitt a surprise today. They have been specially trained and coached for this game, and are confident, even though Pitt seems to be a universal favorite. My boys are in good shape physically, and are able to endure through a hard battle." Coach Warner was somewhat cautious with his pregame remarks: "My team is not in as good physical condition as it was for the Penn game. But I think the boys will play good football, nevertheless. We are meeting a strong foe, and my hope is that the mental attitude of the Pitt players will be such as to enable them to put forth their best efforts. The strength of the W. & J. team must not be underrated."

Florent Gibson described the 37 to 0 result with his usual flair: "All the king's horses and all the king's men could not have kept us away from Forbes Field yesterday afternoon, where from 2:30 to 4:30, the Pitt Panthers gave the Washington and Jefferson eleven a practical lesson in football as she is played, and registered five touchdowns, a field goal and four goals from touchdown, for 37 points while they were doing it."

Richard Guy of The Pittsburgh Gazette Times reported: "Never before in the history of W. and J. football was it beaten by such a margin in Pittsburgh. And never before in the memory of the old-time football patrons was a W. and J. team so completely outplayed, outwitted and outgeneraled. Pitt encompassed the downfall of the red and black through wonderful football, showing a keen knowledge of the fundamentals, quick thinking and splendid performances."

In the first quarter, W. & J. tried to punt from the end zone. "(Left end H. Clifford) Carlson with outstretched arms and a jump, breasted the ball to the ground. It rolled several yards to the side and (right end James) Herron fell upon it for a Pitt touchdown. (Roscoe) Gougler kicked goal and Pitt was leading by seven points."

At the start of the second quarter, "Gougler dropped back to the 38-yard mark and kicked a goal from placement making the score 10 to 0." After an exchange of possessions, "a double pass from the 40-yard mark, (George) McLaren to (James) DeHart, brought Pitt's second touchdown, the latter making a brilliant run of 40 yards. Gougler failed to kick goal." Pitt led at halftime 16 to 0.

Gibson of The Pittsburgh Sunday Post described the opening of the third quarter: "For we saw a football team rise to the ultimate heights yesterday in the first six minutes of the second half, heights which exceed ordinary meritorious football as the peak of Mt. Everest towers above the Himalayan foothills. It rivals fiction, the steady advance which Pitt made from its own 1-yard line, where it received the kickoff, to the Wash-Jeff goal line for a touchdown. Not even the creator of the well-known Frank Merriwell ever had the temerity to imagine such a charge. Pitt made a prodigal display of power that took the breath of the spectators. In 20 plays, following an eight yard return of Henry's kickoff by Jimmy DeHart, who received on the Pitt one-yard line, fumbled, recovered and came back to the nine mark, Pitt went up the field as resistless as the Johnstown flood and scored. It was a team achievement." Harry Keck of The Pittsburgh Sunday Post added "The crowd was awe-stricken by the beautiful precision with which the team lined up and hit-and gained. It was smash, smash, smash, and always an advance. It was a pretty spectacle to behold, but one could not help pitying the Wash-Jeff players who must stand up before the attack." DeHart "glided safely around left end" from the three to score the touchdown. Gougler kicked goal. Pitt led 23–0.

"There followed exchanges of the ball and Gougler intercepted a pass on the Pitt 43-yard line. The Warner pupils showed they could handle the pass themselves by DeHart hurling to Miller on the five-yard line." McLaren plunged for the score, Gougler kicked goal and the total was 30 for Pitt. Minutes later W. & J. fumbled and "Carlson picked it up on the run and sped across the chalk lines 28 yards for a touchdown." Peck kicked the resultant goal and that closed the scoring. Pitt 37 to W. & J. 0

Pitt registered 25 first downs to 5 for the Red and Black and Pitt gained 682 yards to 183 for Wash-Jeff. DeHart led the backfield with 202 yards, McLaren gained 140 and Gougler added 102. The only negative was 5 fumbles by the Pitt backs.

In the postgame interviews, Sol Metzger praised Pitt: "We lost to the best team in the country, and no explanation is necessary. My boys gave the best they had, but it wasn't good enough to beat Pitt. We will have a better team next year, and there may be a different story then. Warner's boys are great and there is no sting attached to our defeat." Coach Warner was happy: "My team was at its best. I couldn't ask for more. I am mighty proud of the boys. W. & J. played a clean, hard game, and tried all the way. I did not expect so large a score, but I am greatly pleased with the outcome."

The Pitt lineup for the game against Washington & Jefferson was H. Clifford Carlson (left end), Claude Thornhill and Leonard Hilty (left tackle), John Sutherland (left guard), Bob Peck (center), Dale Sies and Edward Stahl (right guard), Fred Seidel (right tackle), James Herron (right end), James Morrow, William Miller and Frank McNulty (quarterback), Roscoe Gougler and Sam Friedlander (left halfback), James DeHart and Eric Meadows (right halfback) and George McLaren (fullback). The game was played in 15-minute quarters.

=== Carnegie Tech ===
Week 7: Carnegie Tech at Pitt

Team	1	2	3	4	Total
Carnegie Tech	0	0	0	6	6
• Pitt	7	7	0	0	14

- Date: November 18, 1916
- Location: Forbes Field
  Pittsburgh, PA
- Game start: 2:30 p.m.
- Referee: F. A. Godcharles (Lafayette)

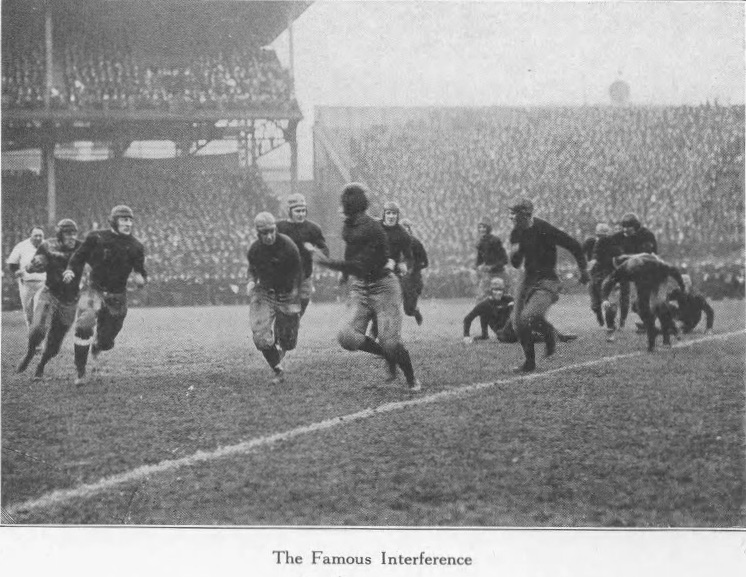
1916 Pitt vs. Carnegie Tech, the famous interference

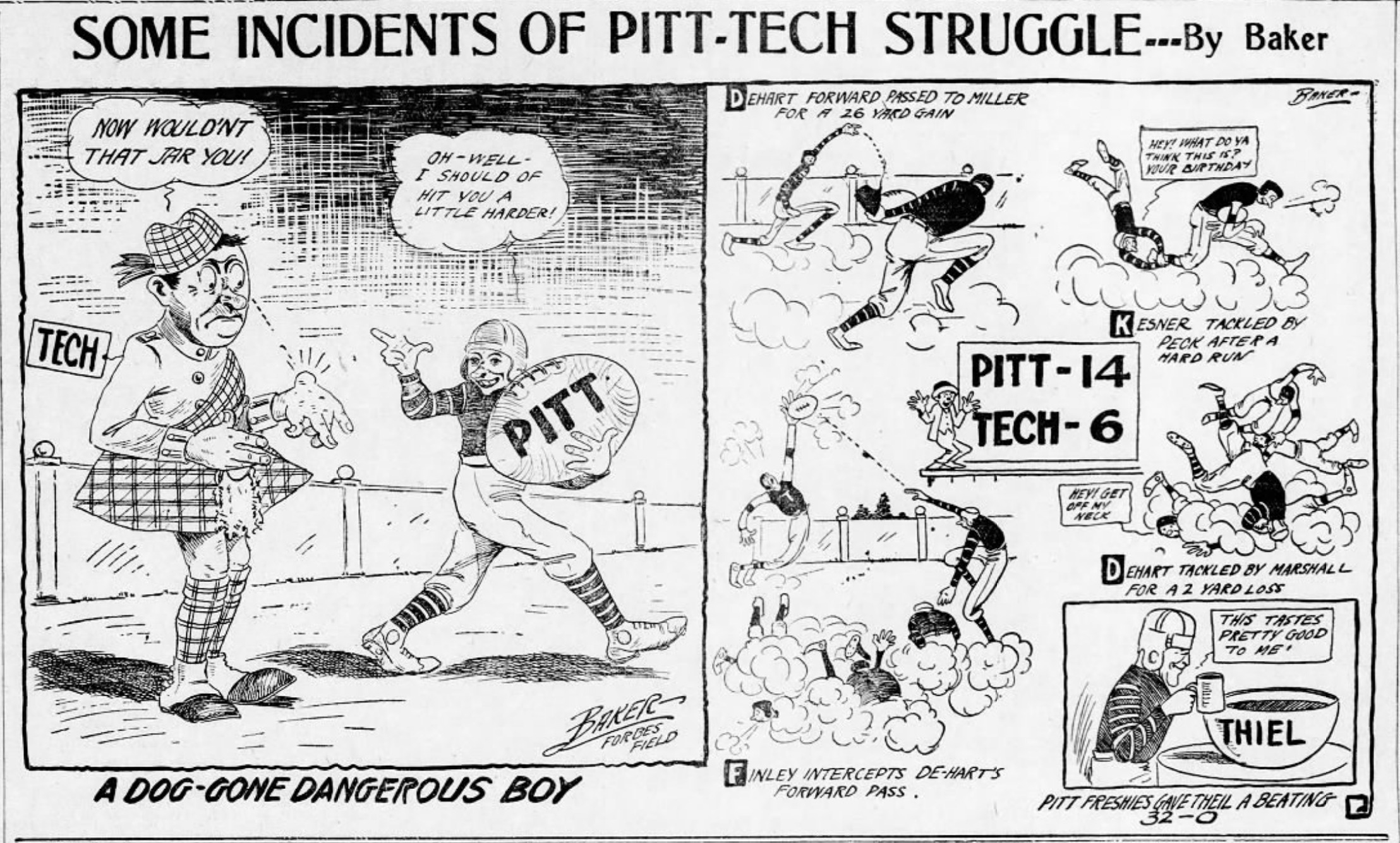
Cartoon depicting scenes from the 1916 Pitt versus Carnegie Tech football game

The seventh battle between Oakland's neighboring Universities took place on November 18. Forbes Field had a full schedule of events planned for the day. "In addition to being able to witness the start, progress and finish of the P.A.A. cross-country run, the fans will see a preliminary football game between the Pitt freshmen and Thiel College eleven. This contest will begin at 1 o'clock and the same classy officials who will handle the big game have been secured to take care of the earlier engagement." The Boy Scouts of Allegheny County and boys from the Irene Kauffman Settlement were guests of the Pitt management. They congregated at Wabash station and marched with a 70-piece band in a procession to the Oakland stadium. General admission for this doubleheader was fifty cents.

The Carnegie Tech Titans, led by third year coach Walter Steffens held a 4–2 record following losses to Yale and Cornell. The team had no injuries entering the game against the Panthers, and the starting lineup was fully prepared for the match.

"Andy Hastings and Jim Morrow are the Pitt regulars who were not expected to be used by coach Warner today. (Roscoe) Gougler was slated to play left half and (William) Miller quarterback." Otherwise, the lineup is the same that played Wash-Jeff.

Richard Guy of The Pittsburgh Gazette Times reported: "The University of Pittsburgh's football team defeated the representatives of the Carnegie Institute of Technology yesterday afternoon at Forbes Field, 14 to 6, and it had a man's job on its hands encompassing the downfall of the Plaid. Pitt won the game and that is about all it did, for the greater share of the praise goes to the Tech team, which earned it through its earnest endeavor. Pitt was not keyed up to the occasion while Tech was, and this disparity in mental attitude of the men was manifest in their work."

The 1918 Owl Yearbook agreed: "Pitt was not up to form, while our neighbors from Schenley Park were in fine fettle, so consequently the Panther was held to the lowest score of the season. The failure of the Blue and Gold backfield to get going was a big surprise to the fans who expected a larger score. This was partly due to the Plaids' stubborn defense and also to a slight condition of staleness resultant from the previous hard games without a letup. Tech had a wonderful team though, and it looked as good as any that had been met. The play was slow and long drawn out on account of the over alertness of the officials."

James DeHart fumbled the opening kickoff and Tech recovered on the Pitt 20-yard line. "Altdoerfer, a giant fullback, smashed off tackle for a six yard gain. On second down, Altdoerfer essayed another play off tackle, and this time he fumbled when Red Carlson and Bob Peck hit him hard. The ball fell to the ground and Miller, the tow-head who was playing quarter for Morrow, gathered it up on the 12-yard line and sped down the field 88 yards for a touchdown. Gougler kicked goal, and the issue looked easy for Pitt, indeed."

On Pitt's second possession of the second quarter, James DeHart and George McLaren steadily advanced the ball from midfield to the 3-yard line. "McLaren smashed his sturdy body against left tackle again and came up on the other side of the goal line for Pitt's second and final touchdown. Gougler kicked goal. Score: Pitt 14, Tech 0."

In the fourth quarter Tech advanced the ball to the Pitt 15-yard line. "Kesner dropped back to the 24-yard line as if to prepare for a drop-kick. It was a fake, and he shot a long, pretty forward pass over the goal line to Early, the substitute fullback, who was standing alone when he made the catch. It was a daring play but executed in a fine manner. Kesner missed the goal from a difficult angle. (Final) Score: Pitt 14, Tech 6."

The Pittsburgh Sunday Post reported: "The Techites regard the game as a moral victory, and not without reason. The Tartan team was carried collectively, from the field on the shoulders of their fellow students, and the Tech parade after the game was the most impressive and joyous ever staged within Forbes Field walls."

Pop Warner stated: "Tech has a splendid team. Tech played twice as good a game against us as they did against Cornell, when I watched them through the game. They surprised me. Steffen has made a great team out of mighty fine material. I don't want to "alibi," but it must be apparent that we were not up to our usual form. If I had thought Tech would be this tough, we'd been better prepared, but at that I don't believe we'd beaten them by many more points."

The Pitt lineup for the game against Carnegie Tech was H. Clifford Carlson (left end), Claude Thornhill and Edward Stahl (left tackle), John Sutherland (left guard), Bob Peck (center), Dale Sies (right guard), Fred Seidel(right tackle), James Herron (right end), William Miller and James Morrow (quarterback), Roscoe Gougler (left halfback), James DeHart (right halfback), and George McLaren (fullback). The game was played in 15-minute quarters.

=== Penn State ===
Week 8: Penn State at Pitt

Team	1	2	3	4	Total
Penn State	0	0	0	0	0
• Pitt	9	15	7	0	31

- Date: November 30, 1916
- Location: Forbes Field
  Pittsburgh, PA
- Game start: 2:30 p.m.
- Game attendance: 27,500
- Referee: J. A. Evans (Williams)

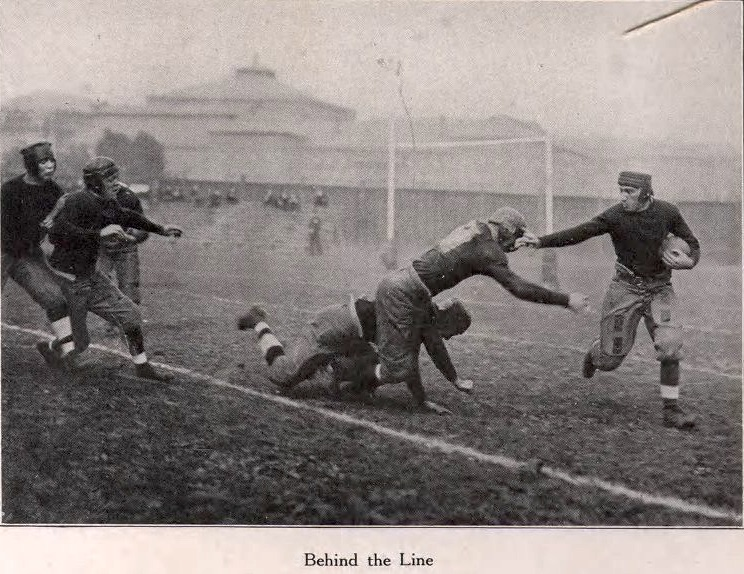
1916 Pitt football action photo

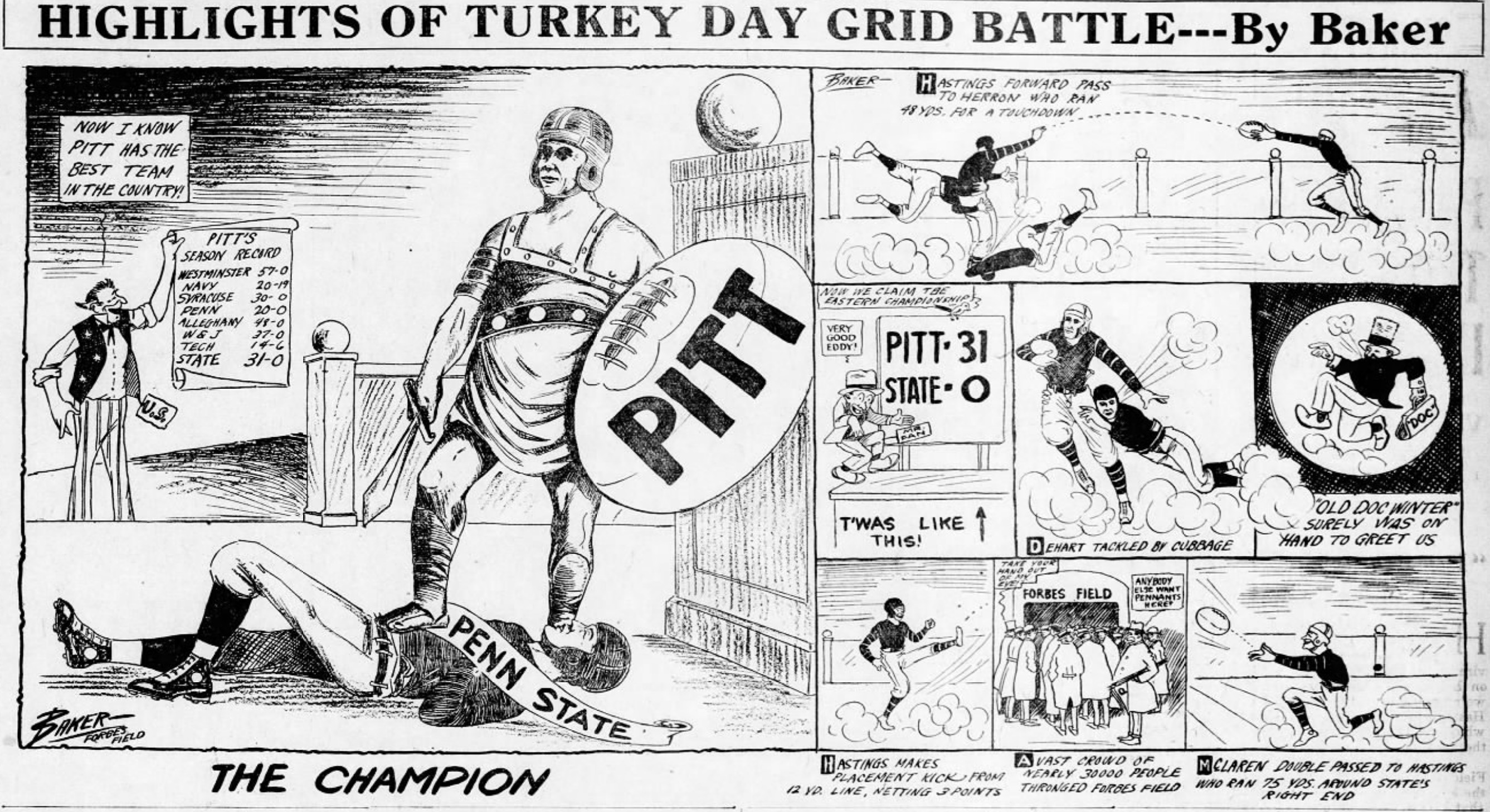
Cartoon showing highlights of 1916 Pitt versus Penn State football game

Thanks to Colgate beating Brown, the only thing standing between Pitt and the National Championship on Thanksgiving Day, 1916, were the Nittany Lions of Centre County. Penn State was led by second year coach Dick Harlow and All-American end Bob Higgins. The Lions were 8–1 on the season. Their only loss was to the Penn Quakers in Philadelphia by a score of 15–0.

"Coach Harlow told The Gazette Times: "Our boys are going to Pittsburgh to give the best they have." State will face the Warnerites on Forbes Field coached to the minute and in excellent physical condition."

Florent Gibson of The Pittsburgh Post prophesied "The Pitt machine will be seen at its best today, and put up a game inferior to none it has played this year, not even excepting that played against Wash-Jeff, which was the high-water mark of the year, although it was good against Penn and Syracuse. For one thing, both Andy Hastings and Jimmy Morrow, who have been nursing injuries, will be in, as good as new...Claude Thornhill's arm is strong again, and he is expected to distinguish himself in today's game, the last of his career. Captain Bob Peck and right end James Herron also are playing their last games, and no doubt will be keyed to heroic efforts."

Ralph Davis of The Pittsburg Press reported: "The football season of 1916 is now history – and it is glorious history, so far as Glenn Warner's University of Pittsburgh Panthers are concerned. The Blue and Gold team wound up its campaign yesterday at Forbes Field, defeating Pennsylvania State by the decisive score of 31 to 0. At the same time Brown was defeated by the count of 28 to 0 at the hands of Colgate, thus giving Pitt undisputed right to the intercollegiate football championship of the world."

Richard Guy of The Gazette Times added his praise: "The University of Pittsburgh rounded out a glorious football season yesterday at Forbes Field when it triumphed over the well prepared and courageous team from Pennsylvania State College, 31 points to 0. These figures represent four touchdowns, Herron, Hastings, DeHart and McLaren, one each, and one resultant goal by Gougler. Six points were added by the medium of two field goals by Red Hastings...When the news was flashed to the throng that Colgate had whipped Brown in Providence, thus giving Pitt the undisputed championship of the Intercollegiate world there was a mighty cheer: the blue and gold warriors entered into the spirit of the occasion. From Capt. Peck down every man fought hard and moved about in his duties in workmanlike manner."

Florent Gibson of The Pittsburgh Post was impressed with the work of Hastings: "Let us briefly enumerate the high points in Hastings' activities. First – When Penn State halted the Pitt onset in the opening quarter, Hastings dropped back and booted a field goal from the 12-yard line. Second – Hastings tossed a forward pass to Pat Herron - “Herron from Monessen”- that was good for a 48-yard gain and touchdown. Third – Hastings slipped around right end for a 75-yard gain and a touchdown. Fourth – Hastings forward passed to Jimmy DeHart for a 28-yard gain and a touchdown. Fifth – Hastings kicked a field goal from the 32-yard line. And all these things happened in the first half."

The 1918 Owl Yearbook recap agreed: "The smashing irresistible and smooth working offense that had made Pitt famous was again in evidence against State. The Centre County lads couldn't cope with the fierce attack, and they went down to the worst defeat suffered from Pitt in history. Andy Hastings, making his reappearance in the lineup, was the sensation of the day. He booted two field goals and scored a touchdown. Capt. Peck brought his career to an end in a blaze of glory. He was here, there, and everywhere. DeHart, McLaren, Herron and Carlson also were very much in the limelight. At the same time as the Panther was drubbing State, Brown was being eliminated by Colgate. Pitt then had a clear claim to the Intercollegiate football title. Verily, 'twas a day of thanks, long to be remembered by Pittites."

The Pitt lineup for the game against State College was H. Clifford Carlson (left end), Claude Thornhill (left tackle), John Sutherland (left guard), Bob Peck (center), Dale Sies (right guard), Fred Seidel (right tackle), James Herron (right end), James Morrow (quarterback), Andy Hastings (left halfback), James DeHart (right halfback), and George McLaren (fullback). Substitutes appearing in the game for Pitt were Roscoe Gougler, William Miller, Frank McNulty, William McClelland, Edward Stahl and Leonard Hilty. The game was played in 15-minute quarters.

== Scoring summary ==
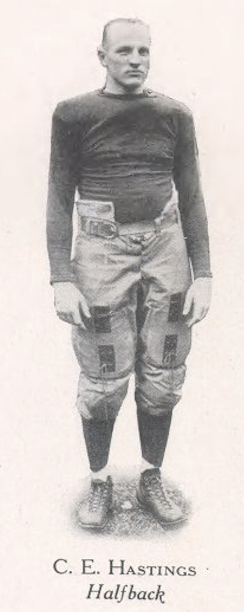
Andy Hastings

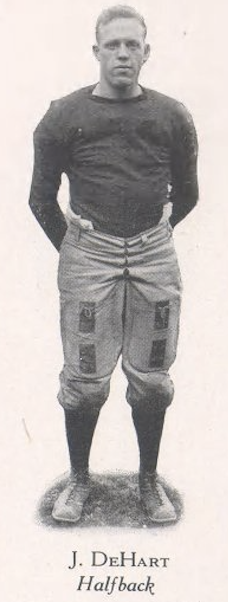
James DeHart

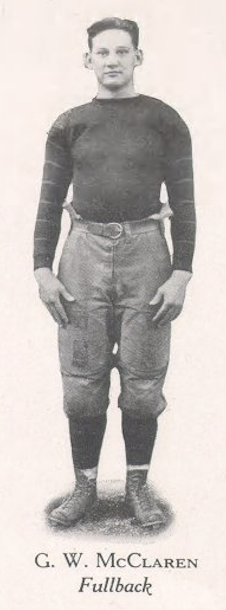
George McLaren

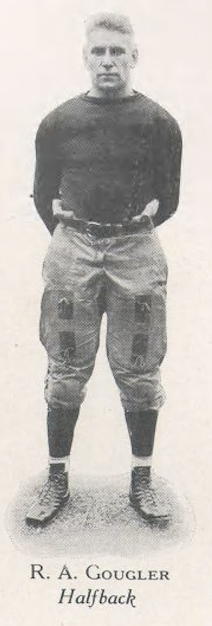
Roscoe Gougler

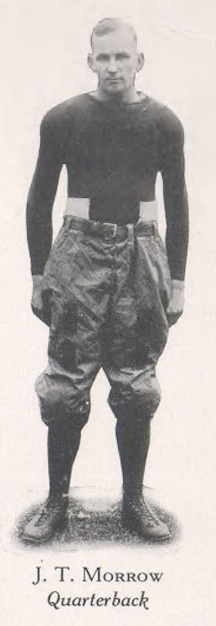
James Morrow

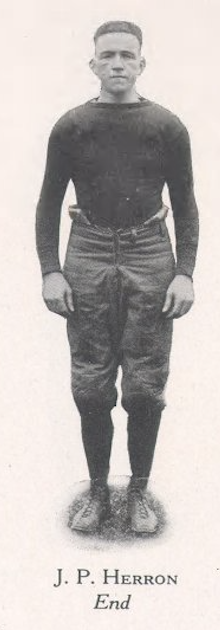
James Herron

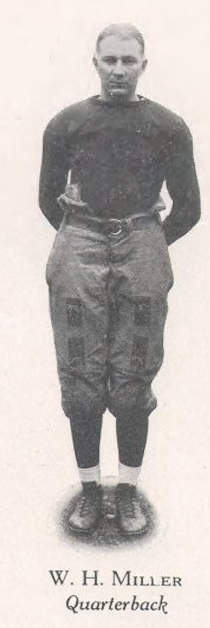
William Miller

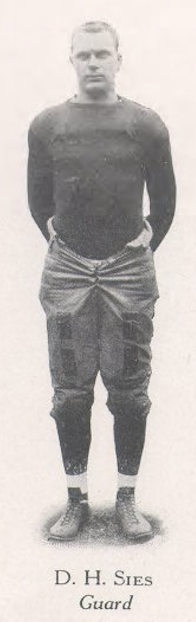
Dale Sies

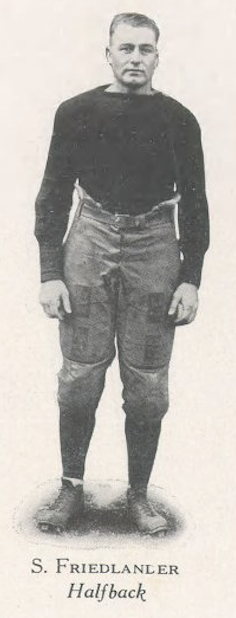
Sam Friedlander

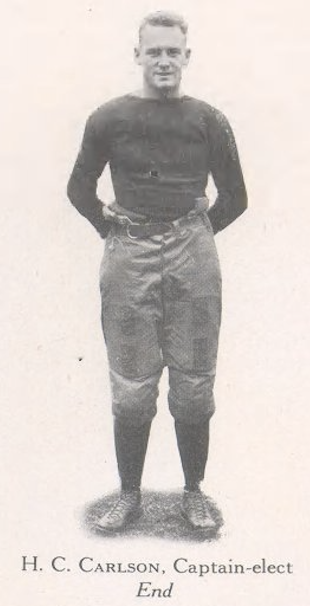
Cliff Carlson

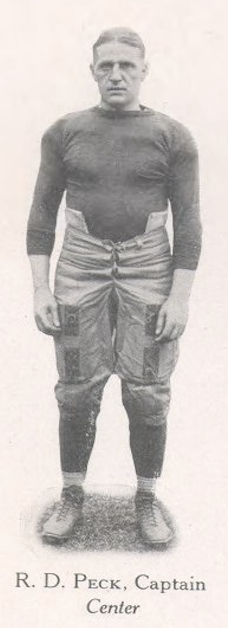
Bob Peck

1916 Pittsburgh Panthers scoring summary
Player	Touchdowns	Extra points	Field goals	Safety	Points
Andy Hastings	6	10	5	0	61
James DeHart	8	0	0	0	48
George McClaren	7	0	0	0	42
Roscoe Gougler	4	9	1	0	36
James Morrow	3	0	0	0	18
James Herron	2	0	0	0	12
William Miller	2	0	0	0	12
Dale Sies	1	3	0	0	9
Sam Friedlander	1	0	1	0	9
H. Clifford Carlson	1	0	0	0	6
Bob Peck	0	2	0	0	2
Totals	35	24	7	0	255

== Postseason ==
The New York Times headline of Sunday, December 3, 1916 read: "Pitt Entitled to the Throne." "The close of the football season of 1916, which was a combination of merry-go-round, maelstrom, and ferris wheel, finds the so-called big Eastern elevens of past years overshadowed by smaller college teams, which for several seasons now have been threatening the gridiron prestige of the great universities. Colgate engineered the greatest upset of the season by beating Brown so badly that there was no question of her superiority over the Providence eleven, which was unquestionably in line for the title. The University of Pittsburgh team had gone through the season undefeated and, while its schedule has not called for games with the best of Eastern opponents, the Panthers of Glenn Warner stand out as being entitled to the position at the top of the Eastern list. College teams in the South and West are not considered in this ranking."

Daniel of The Sun (New York) gave the Pitt eleven their due: "Pittsburg deserves the Eastern football championship. There can be no questioning that fact now. Glenn Warner's eleven earned the title not so much by its own efforts in the homestretch as through the elimination of Brown by Colgate last Thursday. With its clean-cut victory over Penn State, Pittsburg wound up a glorious season with an immaculate record. It's a great son of a great father, that Smoky City outfit, and as much as it may cut New Haven, Cambridge and Plymouth Rock, the title this year must for the first time in the history of the game leave the Atlantic shore."

Coach Warner summed up his feelings at the banquet honoring the team:

"We are being called the greatest team of the East and of the country and I suppose you are anxious to know the reason for our success. Harmony is the answer. There is perfect harmony in football all along the line in the institution. Nothing is done loosely. The management has been perfect and no coach could ask for more loyal support than I received on all sides. Many of the large Eastern teams are failures simply because of a lack of harmony. Absolute harmony is the secret to our success. The players maintained perfect harmony among themselves all season and this made for the very best teamwork. For assistants, I had two of the best football men in the country. It was a great pleasure for me to work with such men as Floyd Rose and Alec Stevenson and a good deal of the credit for our success is due them. And I want to say a few words for the reserves and freshmen. These fellows gave us real opposition in the practices and worked faithfully all season. In closing, I want to thank everybody for the loyal support accorded myself and the players throughout the season."

== List of national championship selectors ==
Among the four teams that all selectors chose retrospectively as national champions for 1916, these selectors determined Pitt to be national champions.

- 1st-N-Goal
- Alexander Weyand
- Angelo Louisa
- Billingsley Report*
- Bob Kirlin
- Bob Royce
- Century Football Index
- College Football USA
- David Wilson
- Earl Jessen
- George Trevor
- Harry Frye
- Helms Athletic Foundation*
- Houlgate System*
- James Whalen
- Jim Koger (co-champion)
- Loren Maxwell
- Mel Smith (co-champion)
- National Championship Foundation*
- Nutshell Sports Football Ratings
- Parke H. Davis* (co-champion)
- Patrick Premo

* A "major selector" that was "national in scope" according to the official NCAA football records book.

== All-American selections ==
- **James P. Herron**, end (1st team Walter Eckersall, of the Chicago Daily Tribune; Frank Menke Syndicate; 2nd team Collier's Weekly as selected by Walter Camp; 2nd team International News Service)
- **Bob Peck**, center (College Football Hall of Fame inductee) (1st team Collier's Weekly; 1st team United Press; 1st team International News Service; 1st team Walter Eckersall; 1st team Monty, noted New York sports writer; 1st team Paul Purman, noted sports writer whose All-American team was syndicated in newspapers across the United States; 1st team The Boston Post, selected by Charles E. Parker, football expert of the Boston Post; Frank Menke Syndicate)
- Clifford Carlson, end (2nd team Paul Purman)
- Claude "Tiny" Thornhill, guard (1st team International News Service)
- James DeHart, quarterback (1st team Walter Eckersall)
- Andy Hastings, halfback (1st team United Press; 1st team International News Service )

Bold - Consensus All-American
