= 1916 All-America college football team =

Official list of the best college football players of 1916

The 1916 All-America college football team is composed of college football players who were selected as All-Americans for the 1916 college football season. The only selectors for the 1916 season who have been recognized as "official" by the National Collegiate Athletic Association (NCAA) are Walter Camp, whose selections were published in Collier's Weekly, the International News Service (INS), a newswire founded by William Randolph Hearst, and the Frank Menke Syndicate.

Although not recognized by the NCAA, many other sports writers, newspapers, and coaches selected All-America teams in 1916. They include the United Press, Walter Eckersall (for the Chicago Daily Tribune), Paul Purman, Fielding H. Yost, and The Boston Post.

== All-Americans of 1916 ==
=== Ends ===
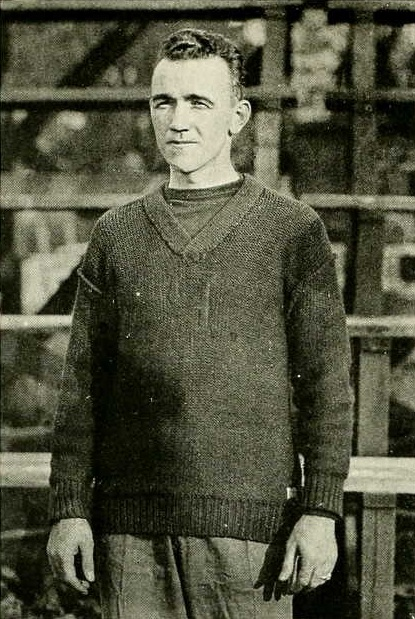
James P. Herron of Pitt.

- **Bert Baston**, Minnesota (College Football Hall of Fame) (WC-1; UP-1; INS-1; WE-1; PP-1; FY-1; BP-1; MS)
- **James P. Herron**, Pittsburgh (WC-2; INS-2; WE-1; MS)
- Charles Comerford, Yale (INS-1; BP-1)
- George Clark Moseley, Yale (WC-1; WE-2; FY-2)
- Heinie Miller, Penn (WC-2; LP-1; FY-1)
- Richard Harte, Harvard (INS-2; MON-1; FY-2)
- Clifford Carlson, Pitt (Basketball Hall of Fame) (PP-2)
- Tommy Whelan, Georgetown (PP-2)
- Charles Highley, Princeton (UP-2; LP-1)
- Stan Cofall, Notre Dame (UP-2; MS)
- Paul Eckley, Cornell (WE-2)
- Bob Higgins, Penn State (College Football Hall of Fame) (MON-1)
- Charles Atherton Coolidge, Harvard (WC-3)
- Graham Vowell, Tennessee (WC-3)

=== Tackles ===
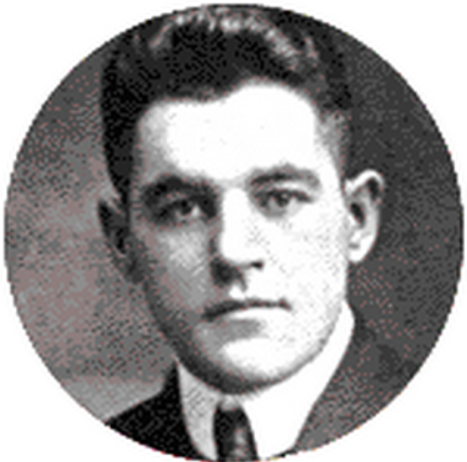
Stemer Horning of Colgate.

- **Belford West**, Colgate (WC-1; UP-1; INS-1; WE-1; PP-2; LP-1; BP-1)
- **Steamer Horning**, Colgate (WC-1; WE-2; MS)
- William Lippard McLean, Princeton (MON-1; FY-1; BP-1)
- Artemus Gates, Yale (WC-2; UP-2; INS-2)
- DeVitalis, Brown (UP-1; PP-1)
- George Hauser, Minnesota (INS-1)
- Mark Farnum, Brown (INS-2; MON-1)
- Fred Becker, Iowa (WE-1)
- Louis Seagrave, Washington (WC-3 [g]; PP-1)
- Fred Gillies, Cornell (FY-1)
- Bob Karch, Ohio State (FM)
- Walter Herber Wheeler, Harvard (UP-2; LP-1; FY-2)
- Clarence Ward, Navy (WC-2)
- Earl Beacham, Tufts (PP-2)
- Lewis Little, Penn (FY-2)
- Frank A. R. Mayer, Minnesota (WE-2)
- John Beckett, Oregon (College Football Hall of Fame) (WC-3)
- Bob Ignico, Washington & Lee (WC-3)

=== Guards ===
- **Clinton Black**, Yale (WC-1; UP-1; INS-1; WE-1; MON-1; PP-1; LP-1; FY-1; BP-1; MS)
- **Harrie Dadmun**, Harvard (WC-1; UP-2; INS-2; WE-1; FY-1)
- **Frank T. Hogg**, Princeton (WC-2; PP-1; MS)
- Lawrence Fox, Yale (UP-1)
- Claude E. Thornhill, Pitt (INS-1)
- Charles Henning, Penn (FY-2; BP-1)
- Christopher Schlachter, Syracuse (MON-1)
- Charlie Bachman, Notre Dame (College Football Hall of Fame) (WC-2; LP-1)
- Robert Lee Nourse, Princeton (WE-2; PP-2)
- Sinclair, Minnesota (PP-2)
- Monroe Good, Colgate (UP-2)
- Mason Barton, Colgate (INS-2)
- Arnold McInerney, Notre Dame (WE-2)
- Budge Garrett, Rutgers (WC-3)

=== Centers ===
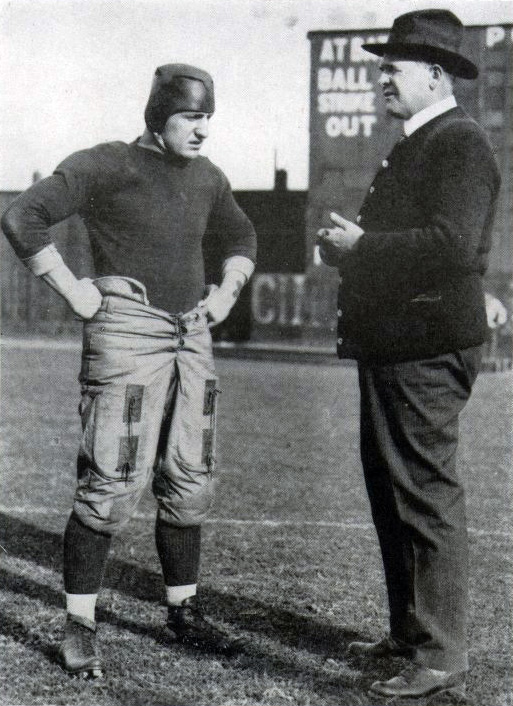
Bob Peck and coach Pop Warner.

- **Bob Peck**, Pittsburgh (College Football Hall of Fame) (WC-1; UP-1; INS-1; WE-1; MON-1; PP-1; BP-1; MS)
- John McEwan, Army (WC-2; UP-2; INS-2; WE-2; PP-2)
- Alfred Gennert, Princeton (LP-1; FY-1)
- Fred Becker, Iowa (FY-2)
- Pup Phillips, Georgia Tech (WC-3)

=== Quarterbacks ===
- **Oscar Anderson**, Colgate (WC-1; UP-2; INS-1; BP-1; LP-1)
- Fritz Shiverick, Cornell (UP-1; INS-2; PP-1; FY-2)
- Bart Macomber, Illinois (College Football Hall of Fame) (WE-2; PP-2; FY-1)
- Cliff Sparks, Michigan (MON-1)
- James DeHart, Pitt (WE-1)
- Clair Purdy, Brown (WC-2)
- Irby Curry, Vanderbilt (WC-3)

=== Halfbacks ===
- **Chic Harley**, Ohio State (College Football Hall of Fame) (WC-1; UP-1; INS-1; WE-1; PP-1; FY-1; BP-1)
- **Fritz Pollard**, Brown (College and Pro Football Hall of Fame) (WC-1; UP-2; INS-2; WE-2; MON-1; PP-2; LP-1; BP-1; MS)
- Andy Hastings, Pittsburgh (UP-1; INS-1)
- Eddie Casey, Harvard (College Football Hall of Fame) (WC-2; WE-2; PP-1; FY-2)
- Everett Strupper, Georgia Tech (College Football Hall of Fame) (PP-1 [e])
- John Maulbetsch, Michigan (College Football Hall of Fame) (FY-1)
- Harry LeGore, Yale (WC-2; INS-2; WE-2 [fb]; PP-2; LP-1 [fb]; FY-2)
- Claire Long, Minnesota (FM)
- Paddy Driscoll, Northwestern (College and Pro Football Hall of Fame) (WC-3; UP-2)
- Johnny Gilroy, Georgetown (WC-3)

=== Fullbacks ===
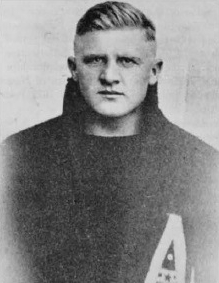
Elmer Oliphant.

- **Elmer Oliphant**, Army (College Football Hall of Fame) (WC-1; UP-1; PP-1; INS-1; MON-1; LP-1 [hb]; BP-1; MS)
- Joe Berry, Penn (WC-2; UP-1 [e]; INS-2; WE-1 [hb]; MON-1; FY-1)
- Pudge Wyman, Minnesota (UP-2; WE-1; FY-2)
- Arnold Horween, Harvard (PP-2)
- McReaghy, Washington & Jefferson (WC-3)

=== Key ===
NCAA recognized selectors for 1916

- WC = Collier's Weekly as selected by Walter Camp
- INS = International News Service
- MS = Frank Menke Syndicate

Other selectors

- UP = United Press
- WE = Walter Eckersall, of the Chicago Daily Tribune
- FM = Frank G. Menke, former sporting editor of the International News Service (INS)
- MON = Monty, noted New York sports writer
- PP = Paul Purman, noted sports writer whose All-American team was syndicated in newspapers across the United States
- LP = Lawrence Perry, sporting editor of the New York Evening Post
- FY = Fielding H. Yost
- BP = The Boston Post, selected by Charles E. Parker, football expert of The Boston Post

Bold = Consensus All-American

- 1 – First-team selection
- 2 – Second-team selection
- 3 – Third-team selection

== See also ==
- 1916 All-Big Ten Conference football team
- 1916 All-Eastern football team
- 1916 All-Pacific Coast football team
- 1916 All-Southern college football team
- 1916 All-Western college football team
