= Mark Farnum =

American football player

Brown Bears
- Position: Tackle

Personal information
- Born: c. 1896
- Died: August 22, 1957

Career information
- College: Brown (1915–1916)

Awards and highlights
- Second-team All-American (1916)

Mark Farnum (ca. 1896 - August 22, 1957) was an All-American football player. He played tackle for Brown University in 1915 and 1916.

Farnum was a native of Georgiaville, Rhode Island, the son of a Rhode Island pioneer family. He began his athletic career at the Dean Academy in Franklin, Massachusetts. He later enrolled at Brown where he played tackle for the Brown football team in 1915 and 1916. While at Brown, Farnum was teammates with Fritz Pollard, the only African American player on an Ivy League team during the 1915 football season. With Farnum blocking for Pollard, Brown won its first six games in 1915, allowing only three points to be scored by opponents. The team advanced to the 1916 Rose Bowl game, losing to Washington state. At the end of the 1915 season, Farnum and Pollard were both selected as All-Americans. Farnum was also voted by his teammates as the captain of the Brown football team in both 1916 and 1917. The Evening Times of Pawtucket described Farnum's contributions in 1915 as follows: "Farnum played in all the games on the Brown schedule last season and his work both on the offensive and the defensive stood out prominently. Physically he is the biggest man among the players, standing 6 feet, 2 inches and weighing 220 pounds. Despite his size he is extremely active and fast."

Despite being elected captain of the 1917 football team, Farnum did not play in any games during the 1917, having enlisted in the U.S. Army following the entry of the United States into World War I. Farnum was commissioned as a lieutenant and served in France.

After being discharged from the Army, Farnum opened a cotton brokerage office in Providence. In 1928, Farnum played professional football for the Providence Steam Roller. He rejoined his Brown teammate Fritz Pollard on a Steam Roller team that won the 1928 NFL championship and bears the distinction of being the last team not still in the NFL to have done so. Farnum was later employed as a research technician in the Pratt & Whitney Aircraft Co. experimental laboratory.

In 1956, Farnum was a guest of honor at the Rose Bowl game upon the 40th anniversary of Brown's appearance in the game. Farnum died at age 61 in a hospital in East Hartford, Connecticut after a short illness in 1957.

== See also ==
- 1915 College Football All-America Team
