= Spencer Moseley =

American football player (1919–1991)

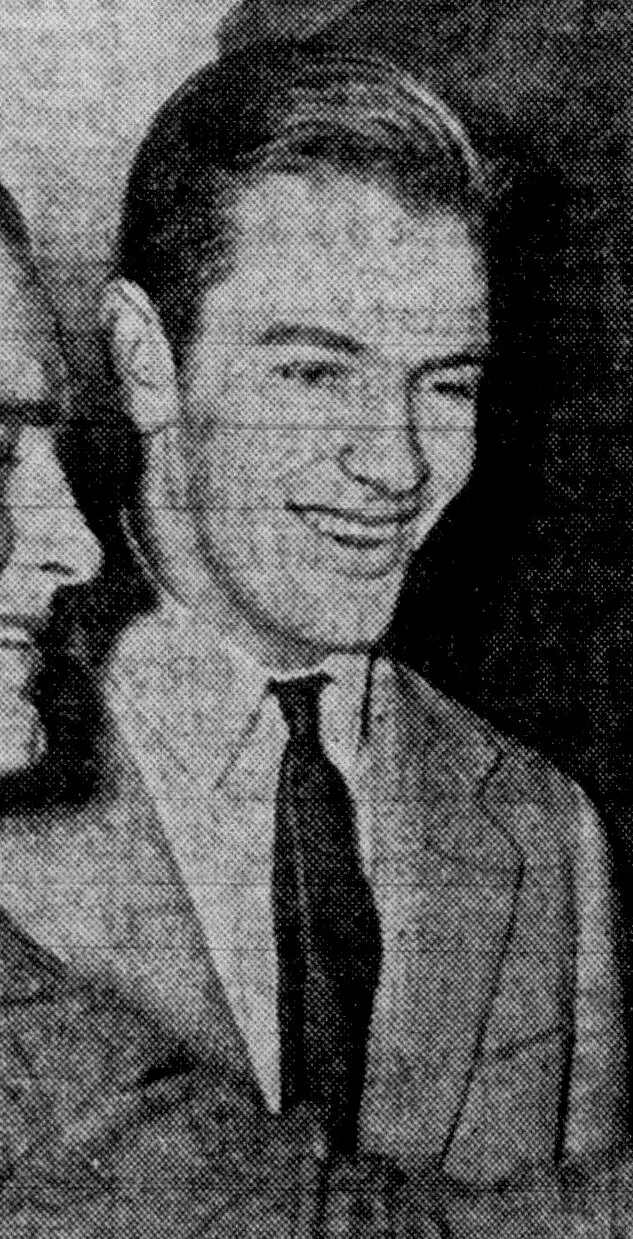
- Moseley, circa 1941

Profile
- Position: Center

Personal information
- Born: October 21, 1919; Evanston, Illinois, U.S.
- Died: May 23, 1991 (aged 71); Chicago, Illinois, U.S.

Career information
- College: Yale

Awards and highlights
- First-team All-American (1942); First-team All-Eastern (1942)

Spencer Dumaresq Moseley (October 21, 1919 - May 23, 1991) was an American football player, notable for his play at Yale College in the early 1940s.

== Biography ==
Moseley was born in 1919 in Evanston, Illinois. He attended the Hill School.

Moseley played college football for the Yale Bulldogs football team. He broke his jaw in his second season but played every game wearing a specially designed harness. Moseley was captain of the 1942 Bulldogs, and was selected by both the United Press and the Newspaper Enterprise Association as an All-American center. He graduated with honors from Yale in 1943.

During World War II, Moseley served as a Captain in the Marine Corps Air Division as a pilot in the Second Marine Air Wing. He was married in 1947 at Rye, New York, to Virginia Gillette Kleitz. He later joined REA Express, formerly Railway Express Agency, in 1968 and became its chief executive officer until he retired in the mid-1980s. He died in 1991 at age 72 in Chicago.

Moseley was ranked as one of the top 20 players in Yale football history by a committee formed in commemoration of the 100th anniversary of the Harvard-Yale game. His father, George Moseley, was an All-American end at Yale, class of 1917.
