= George Clark Moseley =

George Moseley

Profile
- Position: End

Personal information
- Born: April 5, 1894; Chicago, Illinois, US
- Died: January 28, 1976 (aged 81); St. Charles, Illinois, US

Career information
- College: Yale

Awards and highlights
- First-team All-American (1916)

George Clark Moseley (1894–1976) was an American football player. He played at the end position for Yale University and was chosen as a first-team All-American in 1916 by Collier's Weekly, as selected by Walter Camp. During World War I, Moseley served with the Lafayette Flying Corps, a group of American volunteer pilots who flew for the French. His letters written during his service in France were later published.

== Biography ==
Moseley was born in Chicago, Illinois on April 5, 1894, the son of Marion (Wilder) and Carlton Moseley, who was President of the Chicago office of Chase & Sanborn Coffee Company.

In 1937, Moseley was divorced by his wife, Ethel Spencer Moseley, at Geneva, Illinois, on grounds of desertion. His son Spencer Dumaresq Moseley was also a football star at Yale. He was captain of the 1942 team and was also an All-American. His grandson is actor Bill Moseley.

George Clark Moseley worked for the General American Transportation Corporation until his retirement in 1958. He died in St. Charles, Illinois on January 28, 1976.

== See also ==
- 1916 College Football All-America Team
