= Harrie Dadmun =

American football player and stockbroker (1894–1980)

Profile
- Positions: Tackle, end, guard

Personal information
- Born: June 25, 1894; Cambridge, Massachusetts, U.S.
- Died: September 15, 1980 (aged 86); Lincoln, Massachusetts, U.S.
- Listed height: 6 ft 0 in (1.83 m)
- Listed weight: 235 lb (107 kg)

Career information
- College: Tufts University; Harvard University

Career history
- Canton Bulldogs (1920); New York Brickley Giants (1921)

Awards and highlights
- Second-team All-Pro (1920)
- Stats at Pro Football Reference

Harrie Holland Dadmun (1894-1980) was an American stockbroker and professional football player.

== Early life ==
Dadmun was born on June 25, 1894, in Cambridge, Massachusetts. He played college football at Tufts College. After two years, he transferred to Harvard University. In 1916, he was elected the captain of Harvard squad. That year, Dadmun was named first-team All-American by Walter Camp, Walter Eckersall, and Fielding H. Yost and second-team All-American by the United Press and International News Service. He graduated in 1917 and joined the United States Navy. He served in France during World War I and was discharged with the rank of ensign.

== Professional football ==
Dadmun spent two years of the American Professional Football Association, the forerunner to the National Football League, with the Canton Bulldogs and the New York Brickley Giants.

== Business career ==
In 1930, Dadmun co-founded the stock brokerage firm of Lang and Dadmun. He was the firm's president until his retirement in the 1970s.

== Personal life ==
Dadmun resided in Arlington for many years. He was chairman of the town's school committee. In 1950, he moved to Lincoln, Massachusetts. He died on September 15, 1980, at Emerson Hospital in Concord, Massachusetts.
