= Andy Hastings =

American football player (1893–1934)

Profile
- Position: Halfback

Personal information
- Born: January 24, 1893; Brookville, Pennsylvania, U.S.
- Died: May 23, 1934 (aged 41); Pittsburgh, Pennsylvania, U.S.
- Listed height: 5 ft 8 in (1.73 m)
- Listed weight: 178 lb (81 kg)

Career information
- High school: The Kiski School (PA)
- College: Pittsburgh

Career history
- 1920: Cleveland Tigers

Awards and highlights
- National champion (1916); First-team All-American (1916); Second-team All-American (1915)

Charles Elliott "Andy" Hastings (January 24, 1893 – May 23, 1934), also known as "Sandy Hastings" in professional football records, was an American football player. He was an All-American halfback for the Pittsburgh Panthers and remains one of Pittsburgh's all-time leading scorers with 255 points.

== Biography ==
A native of Brookville, Pennsylvania, Hastings began his football career at The Kiski School in Saltsburg, Pennsylvania. He next enrolled at the University of Pittsburgh where he played at the halfback position from 1914 to 1916 and in 1919. Hastings was selected as a second-team All-American in 1915 and a first-team All-American in 1916. He played for coach Glenn Scobey "Pop" Warner and was a member of Pitt's 1916 national championship team that outscored opponents 255–25 while compiling a perfect 8–0 record. Walter Camp called the 1916 team the greatest team of its time. Hastings scored 255 points for Pitt and still ranks third on Pitt's all-time scoring list. He led Pitt in rushing in 1914 and 1915, and also led the team in passing and interceptions in 1916. Hastings finished with 1,527 career rushing yards. He was also elected as the president of Pitt's University Glee Club in 1920.

In August 1920, the National Football League, known in its first two seasons as the American Professional Football Association, was formed in Canton, Ohio. Hastings signed on to play for the Cleveland Tigers. In the 1920 NFL season, the inaugural season of the league, records indicate that Hastings played in at least three games for the Tigers.

== See also ==
- 1916 College Football All-America Team
