= Bob Peck (American football) =

American football player (1891–1932)

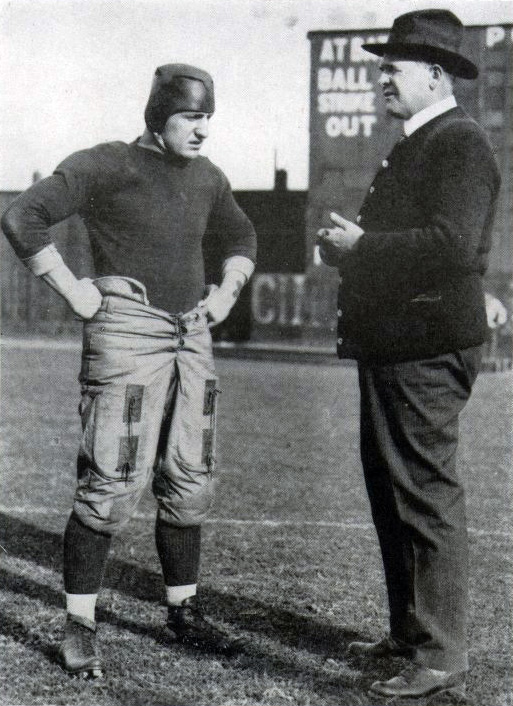
- Peck with head coach "Pop" Warner during the 1916 season. That year, Pitt outscored its opponents 255–25 along the way to an 8–0 record and a consensus national championship.

Profile
- Position: Center

Personal information
- Born: May 30, 1891; Lock Haven, Pennsylvania, U.S.
- Died: June 14, 1932 (aged 41); Culver, Indiana, U.S.

Career information
- College: Pittsburgh

Career history

Playing
- 1917: Youngstown Patricians
- 1917: Massillon Tigers
- 1920: Fort Wayne Friars

athletic director
- 1917–1932: Culver Military Academy

Awards and highlights
- First-team All-Pro (1917); 2× National Champion (1915, 1916); 2× Consensus All-American (1915, 1916); First-team All-American (1914)
- College Football Hall of Fame (Class of 1954)

Bob Peck (May 30, 1891 – June 14, 1932) was an American football player who most famously played center for the Pittsburgh Panthers, where he was a three-time All-American.

== Career ==
=== Pitt ===
Peck was a prominent center for "Pop" Warner's Pitt Panthers. He was selected as a first-team All-American in each of 1914, 1915, and 1916. Peck also won back-to-back national championships in 1915 and 1916. He dropped out of college during the spring of 1916 due to the death of his father, but he was able to academically qualify for the 1916 season – during which Peck served as team captain – by attending class throughout the summer.

=== Pro ball ===
In 1917 he played in the Ohio League, the direct predecessor to the modern National Football League for the Youngstown Patricians and the Massillon Tigers. That season, he earned first team all-pro honors. In 1920, Peck played for the Fort Wayne Friars in the team's victory over the Columbus Panhandles.

=== Culver Academy ===
Following his time at Pitt, he served as the Athletic director at Culver Military Academy until his unexpected death attributed to heart disease in 1932. He was posthumously elected to the College Football Hall of Fame in 1954.
