= Frank T. Hogg =

American football player (1894–1958)

Profile
- Position: Guard

Personal information
- Born: September 1894; Pennsylvania, U.S.
- Died: September 18, 1958 (aged 64); Centreville, Maryland, U.S.

Career history
- 1914–1916: Princeton

Awards and highlights
- Consensus All-American (1916); Second-team All-American (1915)

Frank Trevor "Kootch" Hogg, Jr. (September 1894 – September 18, 1958) was an American football player. He played college football for Princeton University and was a consensus first-team selection to the 1916 College Football All-America Team.

Hogg was born in Pennsylvania, raised in Pittsburgh, and attended preparatory school at Phillips-Andover Academy.

Hogg played football for the Princeton Tigers football team from 1914 to 1916. While playing at Princeton, he was six feet, two inches tall and weighed 193 pounds. After the 1915 season, he was selected as the captain of the 1916 Princeton Tigers football team. After the 1916 season, he was selected as a consensus first-team guard on the 1916 College Football All-America Team. He died of a heart attack on September 18, 1958.
