= Georgia Tech–Vanderbilt football rivalry =

American college football rivalry

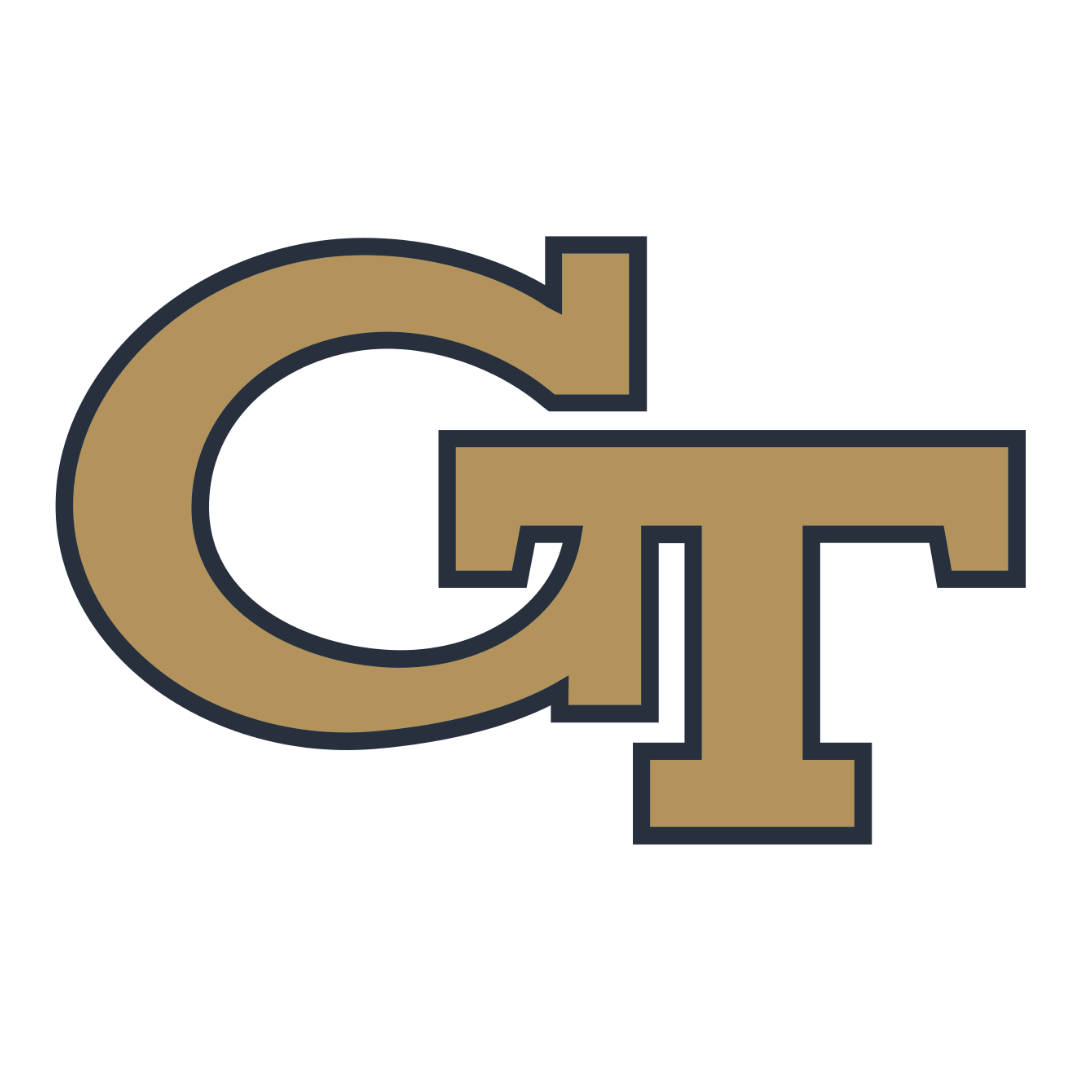
- Georgia Tech Yellow Jackets Vanderbilt Commodores
- First meeting: November 19, 1892; Vanderbilt, 20–10
- Latest meeting: December 27, 2024; Vanderbilt, 35–27
- Trophy: Gold Cowbell (1924–present)

Statistics
- Total meetings: 39
- All-time series: Georgia Tech leads, 20–16–3
- Largest victory: Georgia Tech, 83–0 (1917)
- Longest win streak: Vanderbilt, 7 (1929–1935)
- Current win streak: Vanderbilt, 1 (2024–present)

Locations of Georgia Tech and Vanderbilt

The Georgia Tech–Vanderbilt football rivalry is an American college football rivalry between the Georgia Tech Yellow Jackets and Vanderbilt Commodores. Both universities are founding members of the Southeastern Conference (SEC) and Southern Conference (SoCon), and Southern Intercollegiate Athletic Association (SIAA). Georgia Tech leads the series all time 20–16–3.

In the 1910s, both programs were coached by men inducted into the College Football Hall of Fame: Dan McGugin and John Heisman. In 2016, a trophy for the contest, the Gold Cowbell, was unearthed after almost 70 years of dormancy. The trophy began in 1924.

== History ==
The schools first meeting was on November 19, 1892. In 1896, both teams joined the Southern Intercollegiate Athletic Association (SIAA).

The rivalry was played as a postseason matchup in 2024, as both teams were invited to the 2024 Birmingham Bowl. Vanderbilt won the game, 35-27.

=== McGugin and Heisman ===
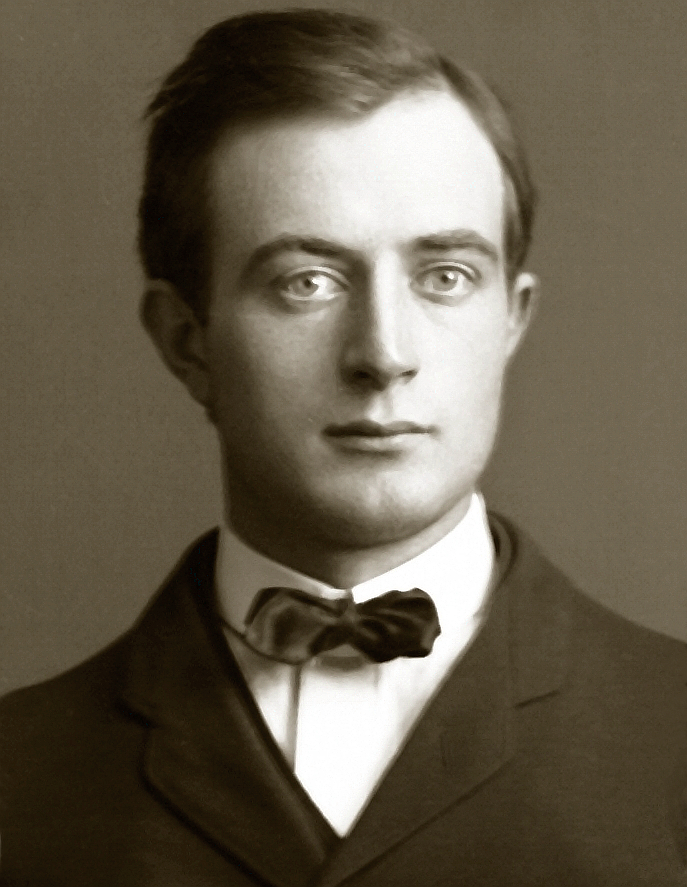
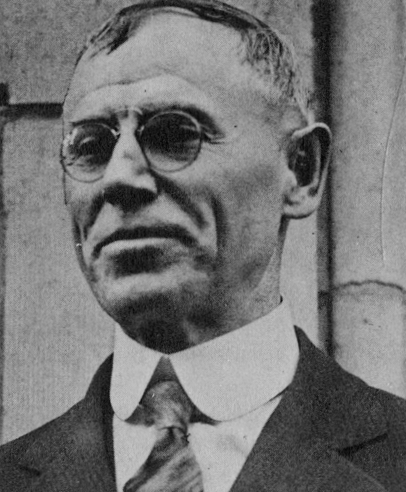
McGugin (left) and Heisman (right)

In 1904, Hall of Fame coaches were hired at each school: Dan McGugin at Vanderbilt and John Heisman at Georgia Tech. (Note: Hall of Fame coach Mike Donahue was hired at Auburn. Every season from 1904 until 1923, with the exception of 1909, one of either Vanderbilt, Tech, or Auburn claims a Southern championship. Auburn and Georgia Tech are also rivals.)

Heisman was already of repute, having won a claim to the 1903 SIAA championship at Clemson the previous season. McGugin was new on the job, but is still the only coach in college football history to win the first three games he ever coached each by 60 points. McGugin would coach at Vanderbilt (with the exception of the 1918 season due to World War I) until the 1930s. Heisman would coach at Georgia Tech until after the 1919 season. William Alexander was hired to succeed Heisman, and he continued to produce strong teams utilizing the Heisman shift. Alexander coached until the 1940s, when he was replaced by Bobby Dodd.

Vanderbilt's oldest rival was Sewanee. One publication claims "The first scouting done in the South was in 1905," before the upcoming Sewanee game, "when Dan McGugin and Captain Innis Brown, of Vanderbilt went to Atlanta to see Sewanee play Georgia Tech."

Both Vanderbilt and Georgia Tech claim a Southern title in 1915. Seven out of eight newspapers voted the SIAA championship to the "point a minute" Vanderbilt Commodores. The Atlanta Constitution declared it a tie between Vanderbilt and Georgia Tech, which was then independent. However, Tech challenged Vandy's championship.

McGugin would win 11 Southern championships in his first 20 seasons coaching the Commodores, including 4 straight from 1904 to 1907, 3 straight from 1910 to 1912, and 3 straight again from 1921 to 1923, as well as the one in 1915. Heisman would win four straight from 1915 to 1918, including a Southern team's first undisputed national title in 1917. McGugin's 1907 team gave Heisman his worst loss at Tech, and Heisman's 1917 team gave McGugin and the Commodores their worst loss ever.

=== Gold Cowbell trophy ===
In 2016, a trophy for the contest, the Gold Cowbell, was unearthed after almost 70 years of dormancy. The winner of the contest was awarded the cowbell trophy tradition starting in 1924, and it was still awarded to the winner of the contest up until the 1960s.

== Notable games ==
=== 1892: First matchup ===
The first matchup was in 1892, a 20–10 Vanderbilt win. It was Georgia Tech's inaugural season (their second-ever game) and Vanderbilt's third season. The 1892 Vanderbilt team was the oldest in the memory of Grantland Rice. He claimed Phil Connell would be a good player in any era.

=== 1906: Manier scores five touchdowns ===
The 1906 Vanderbilt team was one of the strongest in its history. (Note: In 1911, Innis Brown rated the 1906 team as the best the South ever had.) Owsley Manier rushed for five touchdowns on Tech. Sportswriter Alex Lynn wrote after the game that Manier was: "the greatest fullback and all round man ever seen in Atlanta." Lob Brown scored for Tech.

=== 1907: Heisman's worst loss at Tech ===
The following season, Vanderbilt beat Georgia Tech 54–0. "The rooters stridently called: "We want sixty! We want sixty!" The highlight of the first half came on a triple pass. Sam Costen passed the ball to Honus Craig, Craig passed it to Morton and Morton passed it to Bob Blake, who ran to the side and passed it 25 yards back to Costen. Costen ran the remaining 20 yards for a touchdown.

=== 1910: Morrison Licks Jackets ===
In 1910, Vanderbilt won a close game over Mississippi 9–2. Late in the first quarter, Ray Morrison returned a punt 90 yards for Vanderbilt's only touchdown. John Heisman was the game's field judge, and McGugin did not want to show too much, playing Heisman's Georgia Tech in two weeks. Morrison was the star of the Georgia Tech game too, scoring two touchdowns on road to a 23–0 victory for Vanderbilt.

=== 1917: Vanderbilt's worst loss ===
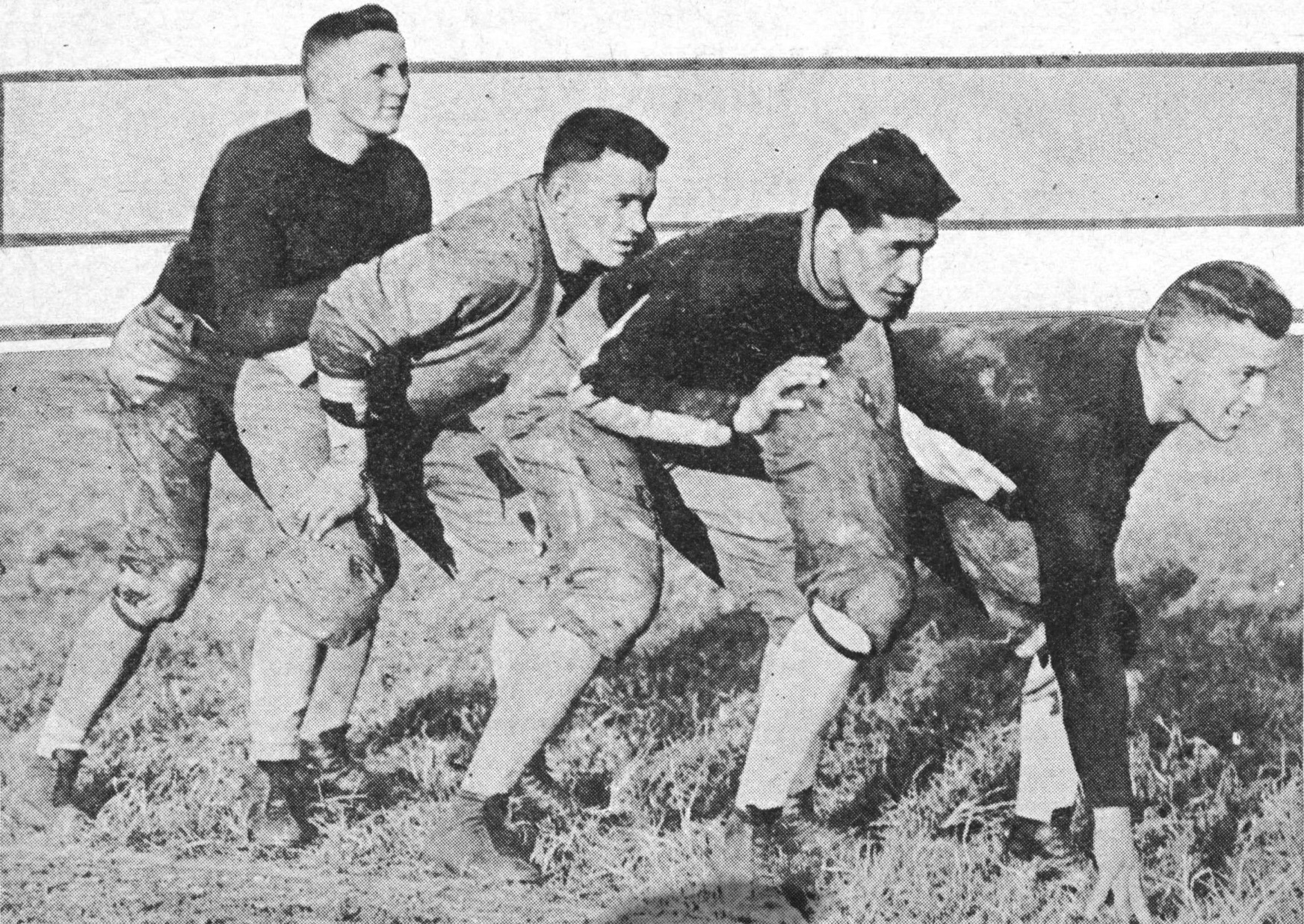
1917 Tech backfield

The 1917 Georgia Tech team was the South's first national champion. Despite Vanderbilt having a respectable team, Tech beat Vanderbilt 83–0, the worst loss they have ever suffered. "It was not until 1917 that a Southern team really avenged long-time torment at McGugin's hands. And it took one of history's top backfields–Joe Guyon, Ev Strupper, Al Hill, and Judy Harlan of Georgia Tech–to do it," wrote Edwin Pope. Guyon was the game's star; according to Morgan Blake, "Guyon has been great in all games this year. But Saturday he was the superman".

Vanderbilt captain Alf Adams praised the Tech team: "Tech's magnificent machine won easily over Vanderbilt. It was simply the matter of a splendid eleven winning over an unseasoned, inexperienced team. Tech played hard, clean football, and we were somewhat surprised to meet such a fair, aggressive team, after the reports we had heard. I think that Vanderbilt could have broken that Tech shift if we had had last year's eleven. Being outweighed, Vanderbilt could not check the heavy forwards, or open up the line. Thereby hangs the tale."

=== 1919: Vanderbilt loses in the mud ===
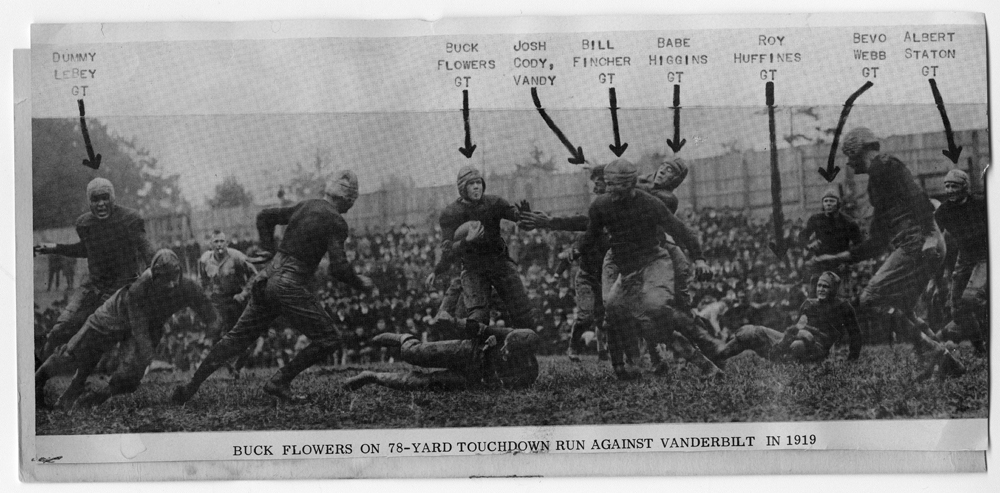
Tech-Vanderbilt in 1919.

In Heisman's final year at Georgia Tech, both teams were undefeated entering the game. Vanderbilt suffered its only loss on the year in the mud, 20–0. Halfback Buck Flowers and fullback Bill Giaver starred. Flowers had a 78-yard touchdown run. Vanderbilt's captain was Josh Cody.

=== 1920: Flowers and Barron run up a large score ===
Georgia Tech continued its success with new coach William Alexander. With Flowers and Red Barron in the backfield, SIAA champion Tech defeated Vanderbilt 44–0. During the scoring barrage, Flowers converted a 44-yard drop kick field goal. In the fourth quarter, a fight broke out between Vanderbilt's Gink Hendrick, and some Tech players and fans. No ejections could be made since too many players were involved.

=== 1924: Wakefield's field goal beats Tech ===
Hek Wakefield

All-American Hek Wakefield scored on a 37-yard drop kick field goal for Vanderbilt's first win in Atlanta since 1906. Wakefield was considered the greatest drop kicker in Vanderbilt history. The Gold Cowbell trophy was introduced after this game.

Vanderbilt elected to start the game with the wind at its back, hoping for an edge in punts which would lead to good field position early. Gil Reese caught one of these punts in the first quarter on the fly and, noticing both of Tech's ends blocked to the ground, raced to within striking distance of the end zone. From there, Hek Wakefield made a drop kick. Wakefield was the star of the game; "He was death on returning punts and when he started around the ends the Tech stars groaned", recalls one account.

Tech's one chance to score came when fullback Douglas Wycoff missed a kick low, partially blocked by Vanderbilt. Hendrix attempted to recover but missed, and Georgia Tech retained possession at the 4-yard line. On first down, a snap from center missed Wycoff, and Vanderbilt fullback Tom Ryan recovered the ball at the 15-yard line, and later punted it away to safety.

=== 1925: Wright should run for governor ===
Describing the most spectacular play he ever saw, coach Alexander cites one from the 1925 game against Vanderbilt. Doug Wycoff was hurt, and his substitute Dick Wright was sent in with only minutes to go in the game. On a muddy field, Wright ran off tackle and dodged Vanderbilt's safety Gil Reese, "usually a sure tackler," to get the touchdown that gave Tech a 7–0 victory. The yearbook remarked, Wright "should have run for governor of Georgia right after he ran 56 yards against Vandy."

=== 1926: Spears beats Tech ===
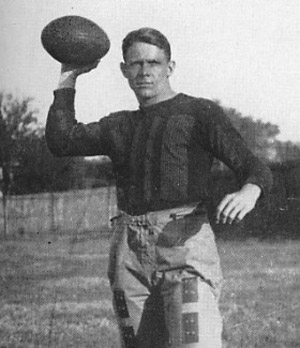
Bill Spears

in 1926, Vanderbilt beat Georgia Tech 13–7. Tech scored on an off-tackle play when Carter Barron got loose for a 50-yard run. Bill Spears faked a pass and ran for 24 yards to spark a drive to tie the game at 7, and added two field goals to win the game for Vanderbilt.

=== 1927: Spears and Armistead held scoreless ===
On a wet field, Tech's strong defense held the high scoring Vanderbilt team, including Hall of Famer Bill Spears and high scorer Jimmy Armistead, to a scoreless tie.

=== 1928: National champions end Commodores title hopes ===
Georgia Tech ended the Jimmy Armistead-led Vanderbilt Commodores' hopes of a southern title with a 19–7 victory. Tech went on to win the Rose Bowl and a national title.

Georgia Tech's first touchdown came on a 45-yard (41 m) pass from Tom Jones to Warner Mizell on a triple pass play. Georgia Tech's next score came on an end run from Mizell. Vanderbilt's lone score came on an 85-yard (78 m) run by lineman Bull Brown after picking up a Stumpy Thomason fumble.

The game has also been credited as the first Vanderbilt football game on the radio.

=== 1931: McGugin's trick ===
Vanderbilt's All-American center Pete Gracey once said "In my first varsity year, the night before we played Georgia Tech, Coach McGugin casually walked up to me in the lobby of our hotel, put his arm around my shoulder and sorta whispered, "I was with some Atlanta newspapermen this afternoon and I told them you were the finest sophomore center I had ever coached. I hope that I haven't made it embarrassing for you" We beat Tech, 49 to 7. Afterward I talked to seven other players and you know, Coach McGugin told them all the same thing he told me."

=== 1933: Wroton Tallies In Closing Minutes ===
In 1933, Vanderbilt won a close game 9–6. In the closing minutes, a tipped pass was caught by Vanderbilt's Lang Wroton for a score.

=== 1935: Geny wins it with interception ===
In the fourth quarter, Willie Geny intercepted a pass and raced 67 yards for a touchdown to win the game for Vanderbilt 14–13. This is the last win for Vanderbilt in Atlanta to date, and the season had Vanderbilt's best SEC record.

=== 1937: Tech wins; trophy returns ===
Georgia Tech beat a previously undefeated Vanderbilt 14–0, and the Golden Cowbell trophy had been recovered after previously being stolen.

=== 1941: Vanderbilt remains unbeaten; Jenkins scores ===
Vanderbilt's last victory in the rivalry came in 1941 with a 14–7 win in Nashville. Vanderbilt remained the only untied and unbeaten team in the SEC, with SEC Player of the Year Jack Jenkins scoring two touchdowns. Georgia Tech scored with a minute left in the game.

=== 1951: Tech wins by a point in the mud ===
With just over a minute left and undefeated Georgia Tech up 8–0, Vanderbilt quarterback Bill Wade threw a touchdown pass to Ted Kirkland. Vanderbilt tried an onside kick, but was unsuccessful, and lost 8–7.

=== 1952: National Champions run away with the game in final quarter ===
The 1952 Georgia Tech team were to be national champions and played Vanderbilt for its homecoming. Vanderbilt was coming off its first win of the season, over a strong Florida team. The first quarter was scoreless, and the score at the half was 6 to 0. After a Vanderbilt fumble, it was 13 to 0, and in the fourth quarter Tech ran away with the game 30 to 0.

=== 2003: Tech beats Vandy in overtime ===
Georgia Tech beat Vanderbilt in overtime. Jay Cutler led Vanderbilt in rushing.

=== 2024: Vanderbilt claims Birmingham Bowl, Gold Cowbell ===
On December 27, 2024, Vanderbilt defeated Georgia Tech 35–27 in the 2024 Birmingham Bowl. The game featured plenty of chippiness between the two old rivals and there were many controversial calls by the officials. There was a prolonged weather delay for lightning in the fourth quarter and Georgia Tech rallied to a one-possession loss. Vanderbilt claimed the Gold Cowbell Trophy for the first time since 1941.

== Game results ==
Georgia Tech victories	Vanderbilt victories	Tie games

No.	Date	Location	Winning team		Losing team	
1	November 19, 1892	Atlanta, GA	Vanderbilt	20	Georgia Tech	10
2	November 17, 1906	Atlanta, GA	Vanderbilt	37	Georgia Tech	6
3	November 16, 1907	Nashville, TN	Vanderbilt	54	Georgia Tech	0
4	November 12, 1910	Atlanta, GA	Vanderbilt	23	Georgia Tech	0
5	November 3, 1917	Atlanta, GA	Georgia Tech	83	Vanderbilt	0
6	October 18, 1919	Atlanta, GA	Georgia Tech	20	Vanderbilt	0
7	October 16, 1920	Nashville, TN	Georgia Tech	44	Vanderbilt	0
8	November 15, 1924	Atlanta, GA	Vanderbilt	3	Georgia Tech	0
9	November 7, 1925	Nashville, TN	Georgia Tech	7	Vanderbilt	0
10	November 6, 1926	Atlanta, GA	Vanderbilt	13	Georgia Tech	7
11	November 5, 1927	Nashville, TN	Tie	0	Tie	0
12	November 10, 1928	Atlanta, GA	Georgia Tech	19	Vanderbilt	7
13	November 9, 1929	Nashville, TN	Vanderbilt	23	Georgia Tech	7
14	November 8, 1930	Atlanta, GA	Vanderbilt	6	Georgia Tech	0
15	October 31, 1931	Atlanta, GA	Vanderbilt	49	Georgia Tech	7
16	October 29, 1932	Nashville, TN	Vanderbilt	12	Georgia Tech	0
17	November 4, 1933	Atlanta, GA	Vanderbilt	9	Georgia Tech	6
18	October 6, 1934	Atlanta, GA	Vanderbilt	27	Georgia Tech	12
19	November 2, 1935	Atlanta, GA	Vanderbilt	14	Georgia Tech	13
20	October 24, 1936	Nashville, TN	Tie	0	Tie	0

No.	Date	Location	Winning team		Losing team	
21	October 30, 1937	Atlanta, GA	Georgia Tech	14	#7 Vanderbilt	0
22	October 29, 1938	Nashville, TN	Vanderbilt	13	Georgia Tech	7
23	October 21, 1939	Atlanta, GA	Georgia Tech	14	Vanderbilt	6
24	October 19, 1940	Atlanta, GA	Georgia Tech	19	Vanderbilt	0
25	October 18, 1941	Nashville, TN	#18 Vanderbilt	14	Georgia Tech	7
26	September 25, 1948	Nashville, TN	Georgia Tech	13	Vanderbilt	0
27	September 24, 1949	Atlanta, GA	Georgia Tech	12	Vanderbilt	7
28	October 27, 1951	Nashville, TN	#3 Georgia Tech	8	Vanderbilt	7
29	October 25, 1952	Atlanta, GA	#5 Georgia Tech	30	Vanderbilt	0
30	October 31, 1953	Nashville, TN	#8 Georgia Tech	43	Vanderbilt	0
31	September 19, 1964	Atlanta, GA	Georgia Tech	14	Vanderbilt	2
32	September 18, 1965	Nashville, TN	Tie	10	Tie	10
33	September 24, 1966	Atlanta, GA	Georgia Tech	42	Vanderbilt	0
34	September 23, 1967	Nashville, TN	Georgia Tech	17	Vanderbilt	10
35	August 31, 2002	Atlanta, GA	Georgia Tech	45	Vanderbilt	3
36	September 27, 2003	Nashville, TN	Georgia Tech	24	Vanderbilt	17
37	October 31, 2009	Nashville, TN	#11 Georgia Tech	56	Vanderbilt	31
38	September 17, 2016	Atlanta, GA	Georgia Tech	38	Vanderbilt	7
39	December 27, 2024	Birmingham, AL	Vanderbilt	35	Georgia Tech	27
Series: Georgia Tech leads 20–16–3

== See also ==
- List of NCAA college football rivalry games
