= Walker Carpenter =

American football player (1893–1956)

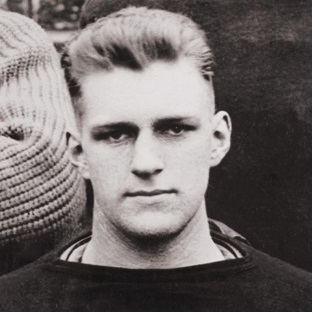
- Carpenter c. 1917 "Big Six"

Profile
- Position: Tackle/End

Personal information
- Born: June 3, 1893; Newnan, Georgia, U.S.
- Died: September 24, 1956 (aged 63); Newnan, Georgia, U.S.
- Listed height: 6 ft 2 in (1.88 m)
- Listed weight: 184 lb (83 kg)

Career information
- College: Georgia Tech (1914–1917)

Awards and highlights
- National champion (1917); 2× SIAA champion (1916, 1917); First-team All-American (1917); 2× All-Southern (1916, 1917); Tech All-Era Team (John Heisman Era)

Walker Glenn "Bill" "Big Six" Carpenter (June 3, 1893 – September 24, 1956) was an American football tackle for John Heisman's Georgia Tech Golden Tornado of the Georgia Institute of Technology. He and teammate Everett Strupper were the first players from the Deep South selected to an All-America team, in 1917. Carpenter was inducted into the Georgia Tech Athletics Hall of Fame in 1965. He is also a member of the Georgia Sports Hall of Fame and the Helms Football Hall of Fame.

== Personal ==
Walker was born June 3, 1893, in Newnan, Georgia, to Starling V. Carpenter and Glenn L. Camp. He was the father of American educator and university administrator Thomas Glenn Carpenter.

== Georgia Tech ==
Carpenter entered The Georgia Institute of Technology in the fall of 1914, elected president of the freshman class. He graduated from Tech with a degree in mechanical engineering.

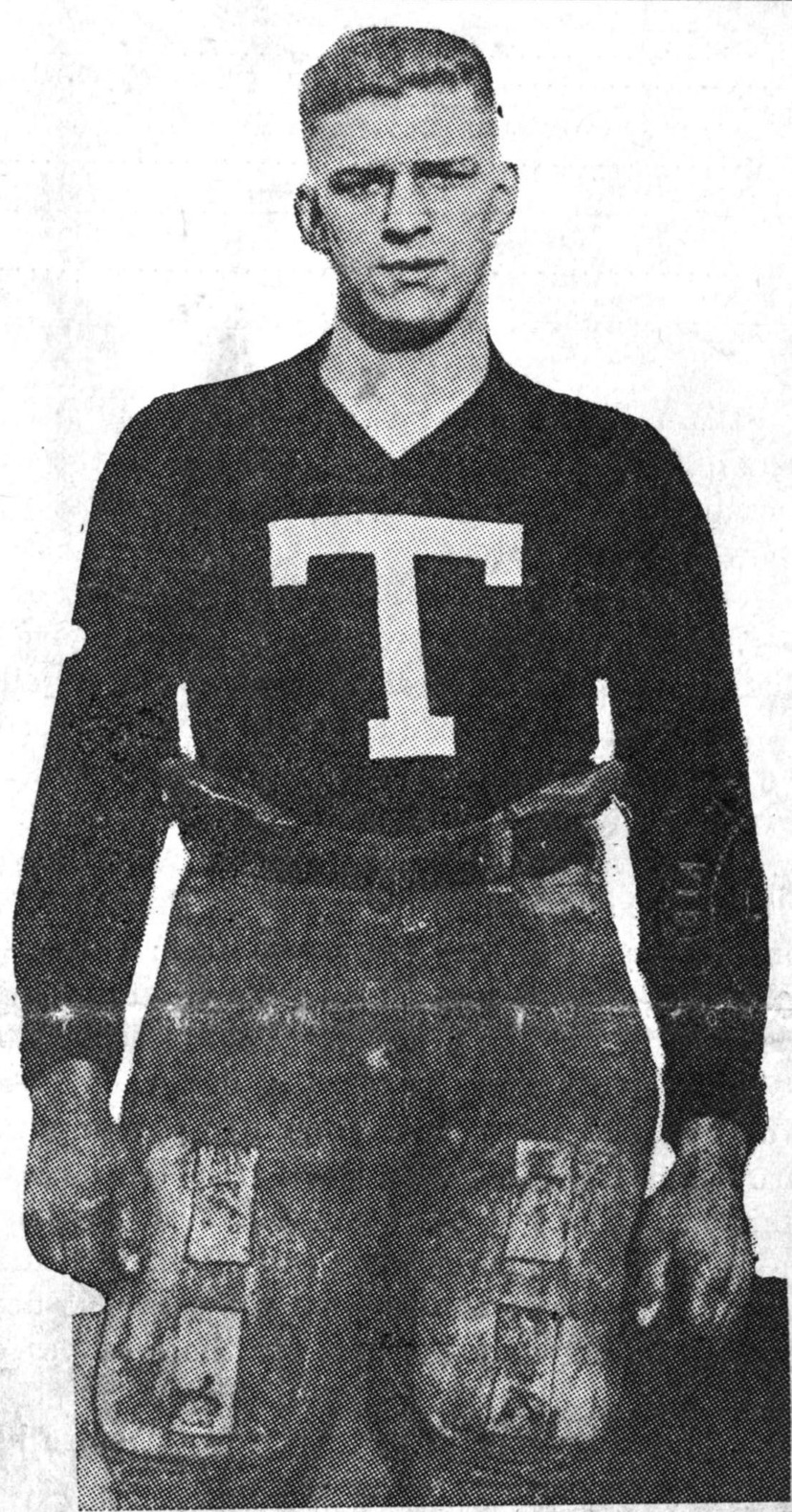
Carpenter with letterman's T.

=== Football ===
His coach John Heisman once said of Carpenter: "On three of Georgia Tech's greatest teams Bill Carpenter—Big Six—played right tackle in the manner that makes coaches believe that life is good. Even the coaches of the teams we walloped were given to saying that it was worth a beating to watch Bill." He was nominated though not selected for an Associated Press All-Time Southeast 1869-1919 era team.

==== 1914 and 1915 ====
His first year on the football team saw Carpenter suffer a serious injury during the Georgia game which caused him to have one of his kidneys removed. It was wondered if he would ever play football again. Carpenter defied the odds and stepped out on the field for the first game of 1915 against Mercer.

==== 1916 ====
Carpenter would be a starter the next year for the famous 222–0 defeat of Cumberland in 1916

==== 1917 ====
He was captain of one of Tech's greatest teams in 1917, winning a national championship and outscoring opponents 491–17. He was responsible that year for training new recruits Si Bell, Bill Fincher, and Dan Whelchel.
