= 1917 Georgia Tech Golden Tornado football team =

American college football season

1917 Georgia Tech Golden Tornado football
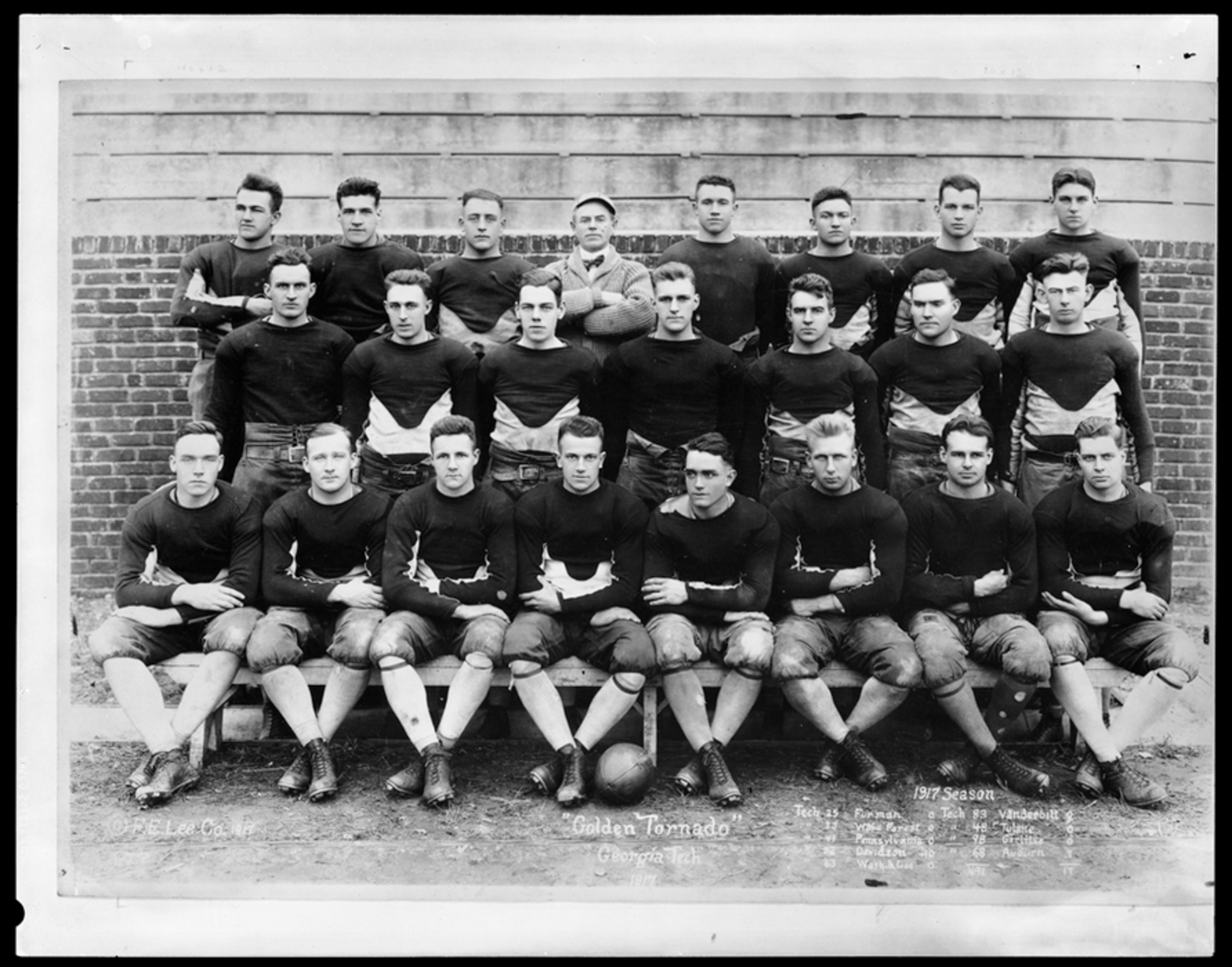

National champion (INS, Billingsley, Helms, Houlgate, NCF) SIAA champion
- Conference: Southern Intercollegiate Athletic Association
- Record: 9–0 (4–0 SIAA)
- Head coach: John Heisman (14th season)
- Offensive scheme: Jump shift
- Captain: Walker Carpenter
- Home stadium: Grant Field

Uniform
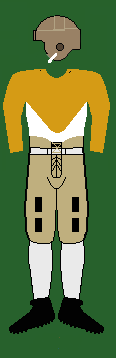

1917 Southern Intercollegiate Athletic Association football standings
	Conf.					Overall
Team	W		L		T	W		L		T
Georgia Tech $	4	–	0	–	0	9	–	0	–	0
Auburn	5	–	1	–	0	6	–	2	–	1
Clemson	5	–	1	–	0	6	–	2	–	0
Centre	1	–	0	–	0	7	–	1	–	0
Mississippi A&M	3	–	1	–	0	6	–	1	–	0
Alabama	3	–	1	–	1	5	–	2	–	1
Sewanee	4	–	2	–	1	5	–	2	–	1
Tulane	2	–	1	–	0	5	–	3	–	0
Vanderbilt	3	–	2	–	0	5	–	3	–	0
LSU	2	–	3	–	0	3	–	5	–	0
South Carolina	2	–	3	–	0	3	–	5	–	0
Wofford	1	–	2	–	0	5	–	4	–	0
Furman	1	–	3	–	0	3	–	5	–	0
Florida	1	–	3	–	0	2	–	4	–	0
Ole Miss	1	–	4	–	0	1	–	4	–	1
Howard (AL)	0	–	2	–	1	3	–	3	–	1
The Citadel	0	–	2	–	0	3	–	3	–	0
Mississippi College	0	–	4	–	0	0	–	5	–	0
$ – Conference champion; There were several SIAA schools that did not field a team due to World War I.

The 1917 Georgia Tech Golden Tornado football team (Note: Although Georgia Tech's teams are officially known as the "Yellow Jackets", northern writers called the team the "Golden Tornado" in 1917; the name was commonly used until 1928 and for many years afterwards as an alternate nickname. It may have been coined by Morgan Blake.) represented the Georgia Institute of Technology (commonly known as Georgia Tech) in American football during the 1917 Southern Intercollegiate Athletic Association football season. The Golden Tornado, coached by John Heisman in his 14th year as head coach, compiled a 9–0 record (4–0 SIAA) and outscored opponents 491 to 17 on the way to its first national championship. Heisman considered the 1917 team his best, and for many years it was considered "the greatest football team the South had ever produced". Georgia Tech was ranked No. 1 in a contemporary ranking of college football teams by International News Service. The team was later named national champion by the Billingsley Report, Helms Athletic Foundation, Houlgate System, and National Championship Foundation.

The backfield of Albert Hill, Everett Strupper, Joe Guyon, and Judy Harlan led the Golden Tornado, and all four rushed for more than 100 yards in a 48–0 victory over Tulane. During the regular season Georgia Tech defeated strong opponents by large margins, and its 41–0 victory over eastern power Penn shocked many. Davidson, with Buck Flowers (a future Tech star), was defeated 32–10. Tech's 83–0 victory over Vanderbilt is the worst loss in Vanderbilt history, and its 63–0 defeat of Washington and Lee was the worst loss in W&L history at the time. Tech finished the season by defeating Auburn 68–7, clinching the conference title. Davidson and Auburn were the only teams to score points against Georgia Tech.

== Before the season ==
Because of the American entry into World War I in April, several SIAA schools did not field football teams. However, Georgia Tech had an increasing enrollment and bright prospects for its football team after its undefeated 1916 season. Losses from the previous season's team included guard Bob Lang and fullback Tommy Spence. (Note: Spence was a casualty of the war. He is the namesake of Spence Air Base.)

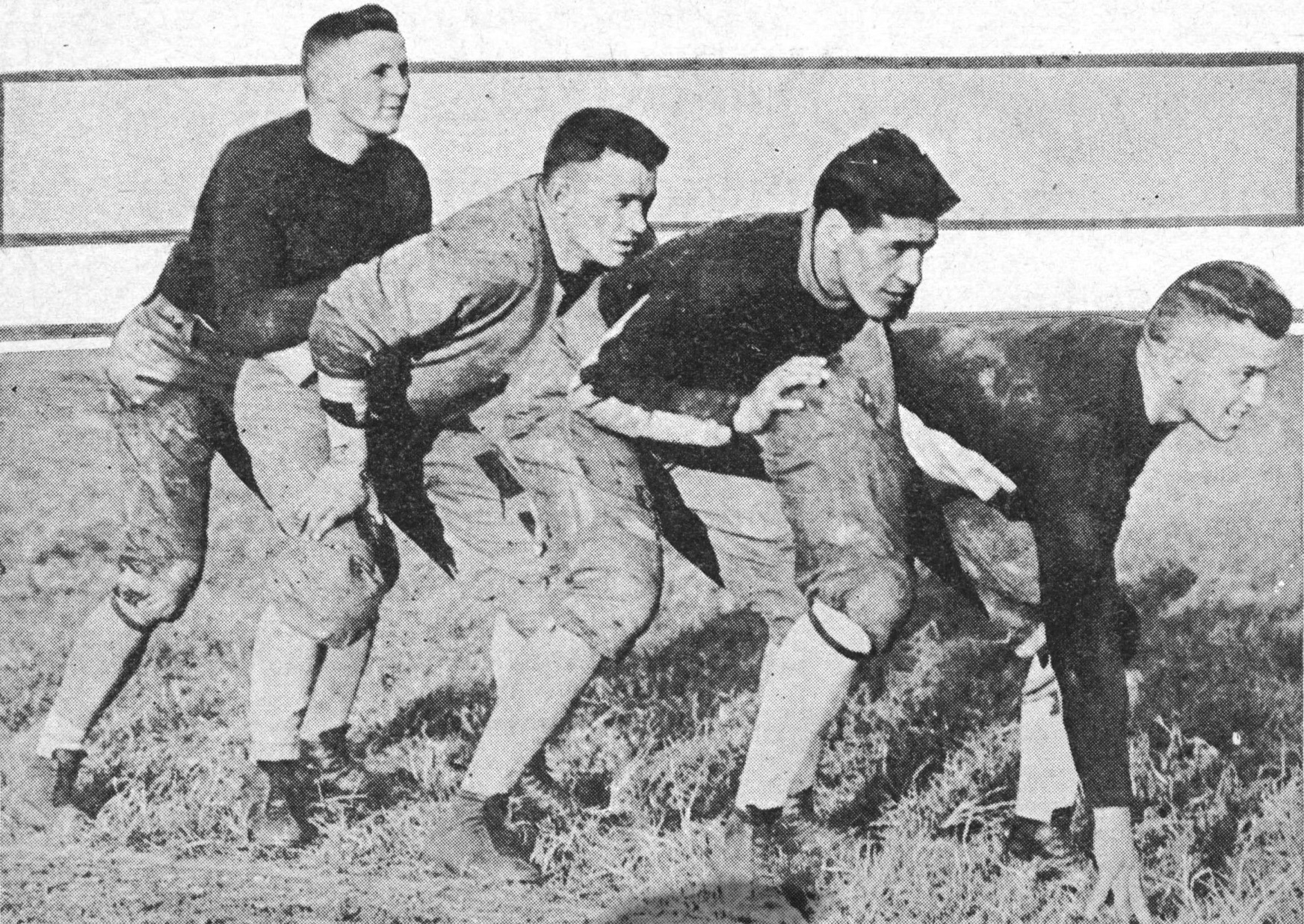
Tech's backfield; left to right: Strupper, Harlan, Guyon, and Hill

In 1917 football used a one-platoon system, in which players played both offense and defense. Fifteen of the 21 players on the 1917 roster were from the state of Georgia, and 10 of its 11 starters came from Georgia high schools. The team's captain was tackle Walker "Big Six" Carpenter. Its renowned backfield consisted of quarterback Al Hill, halfback Everett Strupper, halfback Joe Guyon, and freshman fullback Judy Harlan. (Note: Said by some Tech sources to have been called the "Four Horsemen" years before the 1924 Notre Dame backfield commonly known as the Four Horsemen.)

Coach John Heisman's swift backfield used the pre-snap movement of his "jump shift" offense, and Al Hill led the team in carries. Ev Strupper, arguably the best of the four, was partially deaf; because of his deafness, he called the signals instead of the team's quarterback. When "Strupe" tried out for the team, he noticed that the quarterback shouted the signals every time he was to carry the ball. Realizing that the loud signals would be a tip-off to the opposition, Strupper told Heisman: "Coach, those loud signals are absolutely unnecessary. You see when sickness in my kid days brought on this deafness my folks gave me the best instructors obtainable to teach me lip-reading." Heisman recalled how Strupper overcame his deafness: "He couldn't hear anything but a regular shout. But he could read your lips like a flash. No lad that ever stepped on a football field had keener eyes than Everett had. The enemy found this out the minute he began looking for openings through which to run the ball."

Joe Guyon, the team's best passer, was a Chippewa Indian who was born on the White Earth Indian Reservation; his brother, Charles "Wahoo" Guyon, was the assistant coach. Guyon had played for Pop Warner at Carlisle, and had to sit out the 1916 season in accordance with conference transfer rules. He ran through (and over) opponents, in contrast to Strupper's dodging style. Judy Harlan said about Guyon, "Once in a while the Indian would come out in Joe, such as the nights Heisman gave us a white football and had us working out under the lights. That's when Guyon would give out the blood curdling war whoops."

== Schedule ==
Date	Time	Opponent	Site	Result	Attendance	Source
September 29		Furman	Grant Field; Atlanta, GA	W 25–0		
September 29		Wake Forest*	Grant Field; Atlanta, GA	W 33–0		
October 6		Penn*	Grant Field; Atlanta, GA	W 41–0	10,000	
October 13		Davidson*	Grant Field; Atlanta, GA	W 32–10		
October 20		Washington and Lee*	Grant Field; Atlanta, GA	W 63–0		
November 3	2:30 p.m.	Vanderbilt	Grant Field; Atlanta, GA (rivalry)	W 83–0		
November 10		Tulane	Tulane Stadium; New Orleans, LA	W 48–0		
November 17		Carlisle*	Grant Field; Atlanta, GA	W 98–0		
November 29		Auburn	Grant Field; Atlanta, GA (rivalry)	W 68–7	20,000	
*Non-conference game

== Game summaries ==
=== Week 1: Furman and Wake Forest ===
Furman at Georgia Tech

Team	1	2	3	4	Total
Furman	0	0	0	0	0
• Ga. Tech	6	13	6	0	25

- Date: September 29
- Location: Grant Field
  Atlanta, GA
- Game weather: Rain
- Referee: Fay Wood

The Golden Tornado opened its season on September 29 with a doubleheader in three inches of mud.

==== Furman ====
In the first game Georgia Tech defeated Furman 25–0, playing mainly substitutes. Hay was spread on the field in an attempt to counteract the steady downpour. Tech quarterback Al Hill scored two touchdowns, and Dan Whelchel (called Walthall) scored a third when he recovered a fumble by Theodore Shaver after crossing the goal line. Although Furman's lineup included future South Carolina Hall-of-Famer Speedy Speer, there was little Speer could do to affect the outcome. Tech's starting lineup was Ulrich (left end), Higgins (left tackle), Whelchel (left guard), Johnson (center), Wright (right guard), Doyle (right tackle), Colcord (right end), Hill (quarterback), Smith (left halfback), Shaver (right halfback), and Harlan (fullback).

==== Wake Forest ====
Wake Forest at Georgia Tech

Team	1	2	3	4	Total
Wake	0	0	0	0	0
• Ga. Tech	14	13	6	0	33

- Date: September 29
- Location: Grant Field
  Atlanta, GA
- Referee: Fay Wood

After the Furman game, the rain subsided and Tech defeated the Wake Forest Baptists 33–0. Ev Strupper and Joe Guyon had sat out the previous game. The first touchdown was on the play after Strupper dashed around end for a 17-yard gain; Guyon's first carry from scrimmage for Tech was a 75-yard run.

Strupper scored the second touchdown on a short drive set up by his 40-yard punt return. Early in the second quarter, Strupper shot through the line for 70 yards and the third touchdown. Tech's fourth touchdown required considerable effort and a methodical drive, ending in a 15-yard dive for a touchdown by Strupper. End runs by Guyon and Simpson's line plunging set up the fifth (and final) touchdown with Guyon's 6-yard run. Strupper ran for 198 yards and three touchdowns on nine carries. Tech's starting lineup was Bell (left end), Fincher (left tackle), Thweatt (left guard), Phillips (center), Dowling (right guard), Rogers (right tackle), Carpenter (right end), Hill (quarterback), Strupper (left halfback), Guyon (right halfback), and Armsley (fullback).

=== Week 2: Penn ===
Penn at Georgia Tech

Team	1	2	3	4	Total
Penn	0	0	0	0	0
• Ga. Tech	14	6	14	7	41

- Date: October 6
- Location: Grant Field
  Atlanta, GA
- Game attendance: 10,000+
- Referee: Mike Thompson

In the second week of play, Georgia Tech beat Penn 41–0. Bernie McCarty called it "Strupper's finest hour, coming through against powerful Penn in the contest that shocked the East." In comparison, Pop Warner's undefeated Pittsburgh defeated Penn 14–6. Penn was the first northeastern powerhouse to lose to a team from the South. (Note: In 1906, Carlisle lost to Vanderbilt 4–0 in Nashville. However, though it played a major schedule, Carlisle as an institution was seen as somewhere between a prep school and a major college.) Both Strupper and Hill rushed for more than 100 yards. Tech outgained Penn 276 yards to 11 at halftime. According to the Florida Times-Union, "The result ... demonstrates that the large Eastern colleges will have to reckon with some of those of Dixieland in future."

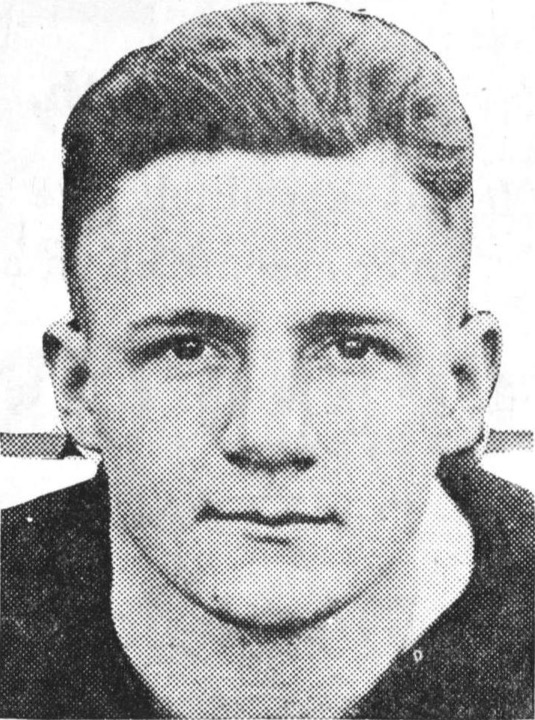
Everett Strupper

Tech baffled Penn by playing conventionally instead of using its regular shift. On its second play from scrimmage less than two minutes into the game Strupper ran around his end, "winding and twisting out of a mass of Red and Blue players" for a 68-yard touchdown. Walker Carpenter brushed two tacklers out of the way, and Strupped side-stepped Penn safety Joe Berry before running the last 30 yards. Tech "scored again in this period before Pennsylvania had recovered from its bewilderment", a touchdown by Hill. For the last score of the half, Strupper made a short run behind guard.

Penn did not have a first down in the first half, as the Tech defense played well. Hill scored a touchdown in the third quarter on a 27-yard run through the line. Penn's only scoring opportunity was in the third quarter. After another Al Hill touchdown and the kickoff return, Penn worked five complete forward passes in quick succession (one 23 yards) to reach Tech's 6-yard line. The Tech defense responded, and Penn turned the ball over on downs. On first down, Carpenter threw Penn back for a 6-yard loss and a pass was incomplete on second down. On third down, Penn's quarterback dropped back to pass Carpenter and William Higgins tackled him on the 25-yard line. On fourth down, Penn came out in a "freak formation" and its pass was incomplete. In the fourth quarter, Judy Harlan had a 65-yard interception return for a touchdown. Tech's starting lineup was Guill (left end), Whelchel (left tackle), Fincher (left guard), Phillips (center), Dowling (right guard), Thweatt (right tackle), Carpenter (right end), Hill (quarterback), Strupper (left halfback), Guyon (right halfback), and Harlan (fullback).

=== Week 3: Davidson ===
Davidson at Georgia Tech

Team	1	2	3	4	Total
Davidson	0	3	0	7	10
• Ga. Tech	0	6	13	13	32

- Date: October 13
- Location: Grant Field
  Atlanta, GA
- Referee: Jogger Elcock

The Davidson Wildcats, which scored the most points against Tech (10), included future Tech running back Buck Flowers in his freshman year. Unlike Tech's other 1917 opponents, Davidson held its backs to less than 100 yards rushing. Writer Bernie McCarty considered Davidson the second-best southern team that year.

The game's first score came in the second quarter when Davidson's Buck Flowers converted a 28-yard drop kick field goal for a 3–0 lead. Set up by a 27-yard run around end by Davidson fullback R. C. Burns, Al Hill prevented Burns from scoring a touchdown by tackling him from behind. Strupper and Guyon then worked the ball close to the goal; Strupper was forced out of bounds, and Hill scored a touchdown.

Tech led 6–3 when Strupper broke the game open in the second half. After a fumble by Strupper, Hill caught a pass from the 22-yard line and ran in for a touchdown. Strupper made the next touchdown after Tech ran through Davidson's right guard. Strupper then recovered a punt fumbled by Flowers on Davidson's 30-yard line, leading to a score by Hill from 18 yards out on a criss-cross run. Davidson scored its only touchdown on a forward pass. From midfield, quarterback Henry Spann hit end Georgie King on a 50-yard touchdown pass that went 30 yards in the air, catching Tech by surprise. For Tech's last score, Judy Harlan returned an interception 40 yards for a touchdown.

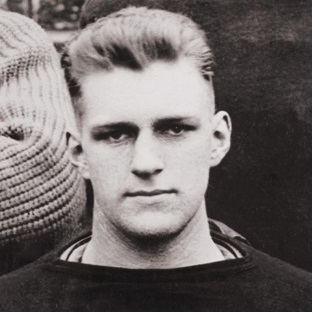
Team captain Walker Carpenter

The defense of Walker Carpenter and William Thweatt was the game's highlight. Tech made 16 first downs and Davidson 13. Neither Pup Phillips nor Ham Dowling played in this game, with Bill Fincher replacing Phillips at center. The umpire was Fay Wood, and Boozer Pitts was the head linesman. Davidson captain Georgie King said, "I consider Georgia Tech the best football team I have ever played against or ever expect to play against." Tech's starting lineup was Guill (left end), Whelchel (left tackle), Higgins (left guard), Fincher (center), Rogers (right guard), Thweatt (right tackle), Carpenter (right end), Hill (quarterback), Strupper (left halfback), Guyon (right halfback), and Harlan (fullback).

=== Week 4: Washington and Lee ===
Washington and Lee at Georgia Tech

Team	1	2	3	4	Total
W&L	0	0	0	0	0
• Ga. Tech	7	14	28	14	63

- Date: October 20
- Location: Grant Field
  Atlanta, GA
- Referee: Rip Major

In a 63–0 victory against the Washington and Lee Generals, Tech made 35 first downs to Washington and Lee's five. At the time, it was the Generals' worst loss. According to Judy Harlan, Joe Guyon knocked a Washington and Lee player out of the game by "wearing an old horse collar shaped into a shoulder pad but reinforced with a little steel". The player may have been Turner Bethel, who was knocked out of the game and taken to a local hospital.

"The game was never in doubt after 'Strup' got away for his first long run", a 35-yarder followed a few minutes later by his 16-yard touchdown run. Although Strupper only played in the first half because of a leg injury, he gained 128 yards in addition to scoring the touchdown. Al Hill scored four touchdowns, Guyon three, and Pup Phillips also had one with a 30-yard interception return. Tech's starting lineup was Ulrich (left end), Fincher (left tackle), Whelchel (left guard), Phillips (center), Dowling (right guard), Carpenter (right tackle), Bell (right end), Hill (quarterback), Strupper (left halfback), Guyon (right halfback), and Harlan (fullback).

=== Week 5: Vanderbilt ===
Vanderbilt at Georgia Tech

Team	1	2	3	4	Total
Vanderbilt	0	0	0	0	0
• Ga. Tech	27	14	21	21	83

- Date: November 3
- Location: Grant Field
  Atlanta, GA
- Game start: 2:30 p. m.
- Referee: Jogger Elcock

Tech's 83–0 defeat of the Vanderbilt Commodores was the worst in Vanderbilt history. "It was not until 1917 that a Southern team really avenged long-time torment at McGugin's hands. And it took one of history's top backfields–Joe Guyon, Ev Strupper, Al Hill, and Judy Harlan of Georgia Tech–to do it," writes Edwin Pope. The team was not the Commodores' worst, and had defeated Alabama.

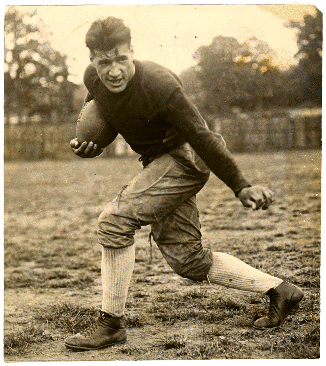
Joe Guyon

Joe Guyon was the game's star; according to Morgan Blake, "Guyon has been great in all games this year. But Saturday he was the superman". Guyon ran nine times for 124 yards, with kick returns for 95 yards and 80 yards passing. He scored on 48- and one-yard runs, had a 75-yard kick return to set up a touchdown, and threw a pass to Shorty Guill for a score. Ev Strupper ran for four touchdowns and 147 yards in 14 carries, returning five punts for 111 yards. Al Hill ran 169 yards in 25 carries, scoring three touchdowns, and Judy Harlan carried 15 times for 132 yards and two touchdowns.

Vanderbilt captain Alf Adams praised the Tech team: "Tech's magnificent machine won easily over Vanderbilt. It was simply the matter of a splendid eleven winning over an unseasoned, inexperienced team. Tech played hard, clean football, and we were somewhat surprised to meet such a fair, aggressive team, after the reports we had heard. I think that Vanderbilt could have broken that Tech shift if we had had last year's eleven. Being outweighed, Vanderbilt could not check the heavy forwards, or open up the line. Thereby hangs the tale." Tech's starting lineup was Guill (left end), Fincher (left tackle), Whelchel (left guard), Phillips (center), Dowling (right guard), Carpenter (right tackle), Bell (right end), Hill (quarterback), Strupper (left halfback), Guyon (right halfback), and Harlan (fullback).

=== Week 6: at Tulane ===
Georgia Tech at Tulane

Team	1	2	3	4	Total
• Ga. Tech	14	21	6	7	48
Tulane	0	0	0	0	0

- Date: November 10
- Location: Second Tulane Stadium
  New Orleans, LA
- Referee: George Watkins

Tech played coach Clark Shaughnessy's Tulane Olive and Blue for its only road game, winning 48–0. Against a solid foe with a 5–3 record, all four Tech backs ran over 100 yards. According to the Times-Picayune, "Strupper, Guyon, Hill, and Harlan form a backfield with no superiors and few equals in football history". Joe Guyon threw two touchdowns and ran for one, passing 91 yards and running 112: "Guyon's passing was so accurate it suggest possibilities yet undeveloped in the Tech offense". Al Hill ran for 140 yards on 24 carries, including a 48-yard touchdown. Ev Strupper scored twice (one on a 33-yard pass from Guyon) and ran for 118 yards; Harlan ran for 111. Missing an extra point in the third quarter, Bill Fincher ended his streak at 31. The game was called with six minutes left because of darkness. Tech's starting lineup was Guill (left end), Fincher (left tackle), Whelchel (left guard), Phillips (center), Thweatt (right guard), Carpenter (right tackle), Bell (right end), Hill (quarterback), Strupper (left halfback), Guyon (right halfback), and Harlan (fullback).

=== Week 7: Carlisle ===
Carlisle at Georgia Tech

Team	1	2	3	4	Total
Carlisle	0	0	0	0	0
• Ga. Tech	28	28	28	14	98

- Date: November 17
- Location: Grant Field
  Atlanta, GA
- Referee: Fay Wood

In a 98–0 win against the Carlisle Indians, Strupper's performance was praised. Morgan Blake of the Atlanta Journal wrote, "Everett Strupper played like a veritable demon. At one time four Carlisle men pounced on him from all directions, and yet through some superhuman witchery he broke loose and dashed 10 yards further. On another occasion he attempted a wide end run, found that he was completely blocked, then suddenly whirled and ran the other way, gaining something like 25 yards before he was downed."

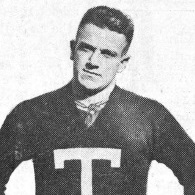
Quarterback Al Hill

Hill and Strupper each scored five touchdowns; Shorty Guill had two touchdowns and 108 yards rushing. Billy Sunday wrote, "That jump shift is about the slickest offense I ever saw." One of Strupper's touchdowns was a 32-yard fumble return. This was Carlisle's last season before the school closed. Guyon asked to be substituted midway through the game against his former school, perhaps for sentimental reasons. Tech's starting lineup was Fincher (left end), Higgins (left tackle), Whelchel (left guard), Phillips (center), Dowling (right guard), Carpenter (right tackle), Bell (right end), Hill (quarterback), Strupper (left halfback), Guyon (right halfback), and Guill (fullback).

=== Week 8: Auburn ===
Auburn at Georgia Tech

Team	1	2	3	4	Total
Auburn	0	0	0	7	7
• Ga. Tech	20	13	21	14	68

- Date: November 29
- Location: Grant Field
  Atlanta, GA
- Game attendance: 20,000
- Referee: Jogger Elcock

In the season's final game, Tech defeated the Auburn Tigers 68–7. Coach Mike Donahue's Tigers had lost only to Davidson in an upset, and held undefeated Big Ten champion Ohio State to a scoreless tie less than a week before the Tech game. Ohio State, led by Chic Harley, had been favored 4 or 5 to 1. Coach Heisman (who previously coached at Auburn) and his players were at the game, rooting for the Tigers.

In the game with Auburn, Tech piled up 472 yards on the ground in 84 rushes and 145 yards in the air. Guyon scored four touchdowns, and Strupper had a 65-yard touchdown run. According to the Atlanta Journal,

It was not the length of the run that featured it was the brilliance of it. After getting through the first line, Stroop was tackled squarely by two secondary men, and yet he squirmed and jerked loosed from them, only to face the safety man and another Tiger, coming at him from different angles. Without checking his speed Everett knifed the two men completely, running between them and dashing on to a touchdown.

In the second quarter, Auburn's Moon Ducote broke through the line toward the goal with blocking by Pete Bonner and William Donahue. (Note: Coach Donahue said that Ducote was "undoubtedly the best ever.") After Guyon dove at Ducote and missed, Guyon gave chase and tackled him at the 26-yard line. For Auburn's only score Ducote circled around end for 17 yards and lateraled to Donahue, who ran down the sideline for a six-yard touchdown. Guyon was the star of the game, accounting for four touchdowns and having his best day passing. Strupper had touchdown runs of 62 and 50 yards. Auburn was considered a strong team, despite the lopsided score; Ducote and Bonner were the only non-Tech, unanimous All-Southern selections. Tech's starting lineup was Fincher (left end), Higgins (left tackle), Mathes (left guard), Phillips (center), Dowling (right guard), Carpenter (right tackle), Bell (right end), Hill (quarterback), Strupper (left halfback), Guyon (right halfback), and Guill (fullback).

== After the season ==
=== Awards and honors ===
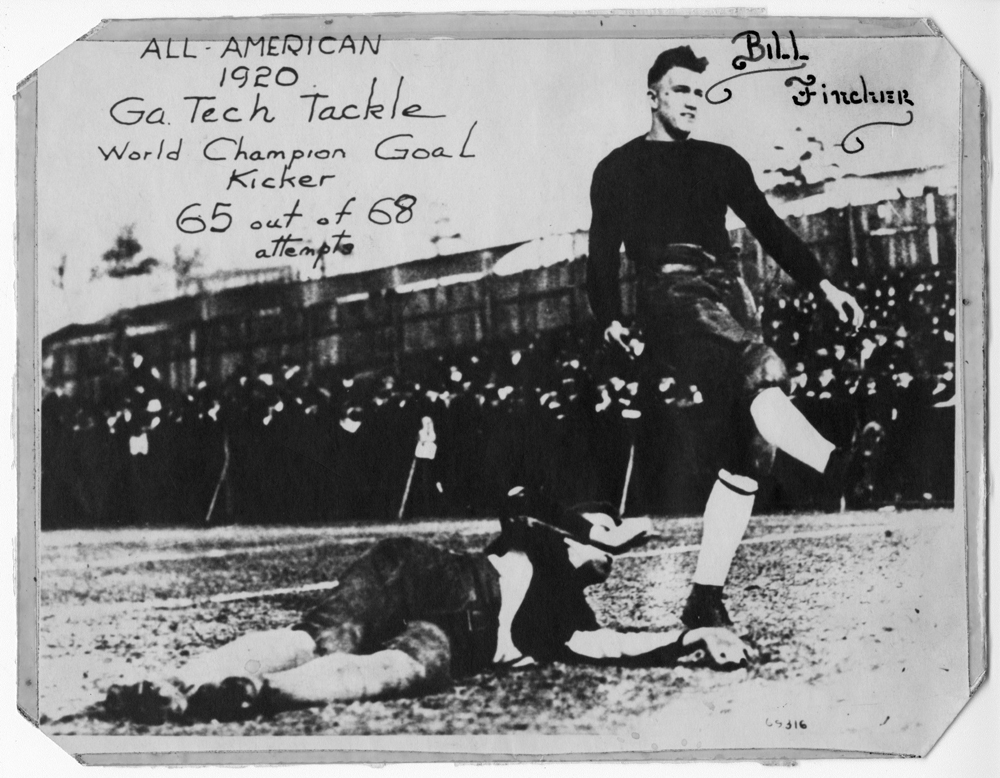
Bill Fincher place kicking

The Golden Tornado led the nation in scoring, with 491 points. Quarterback Al Hill led the nation in touchdowns with 23, and tackle Bill Fincher kicked 49 extra points.

A number of Georgia Tech players received post-season honors. Walker Carpenter, Everett Strupper, and Joe Guyon were All-America selections, with Carpenter and Strupper the first two players from the Deep South selected for a first-team. In addition to Carpenter, Strupper, and Guyon, Bill Fincher, Pup Phillips, Si Bell, Shorty Guill, and Al Hill were selected to the All-Southern Team by sportswriters. Phillips also received the Hal Nowell trophy for the most efficient play during the season.

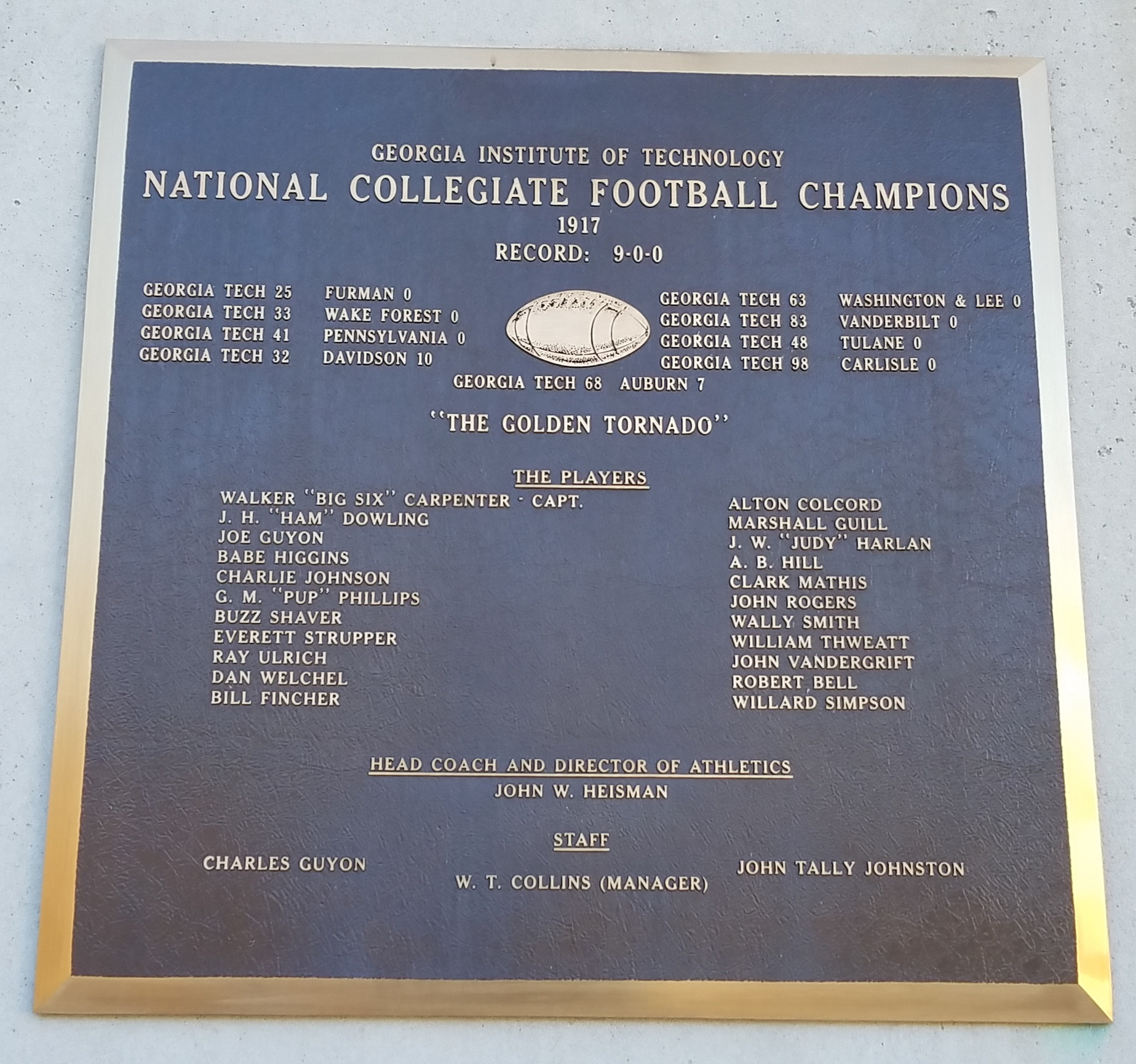
Plaque at Georgia Tech honoring their National Championship season

==== National champions ====
On December 8, the Golden Tornado celebrated its national-championship season at a team dinner at the Druid Hills Golf Club in Atlanta. Each member was presented with a gold football inscribed with the words "National Champions". Clarke Mathes, William Thweatt, Dan Whelchel, Theodore Shaver, and William Higgins had already enlisted in the U. S. Marines for the First World War; a week later, Si Bell, Jim Fellers, Pup Phillips, and Charles Johnson also left for the Marines.

Heisman challenged Pop Warner's Pittsburgh team to a postseason game to determine a national champion, but since they did not play until the following season, (Note: In 1918, Pittsburgh beat Tech 32–0.) Tech was named national champion. Although the Golden Tornado was invited to play the 4–3 Oregon team in the Rose Bowl, by then many players had joined the war effort.

=== Legacy ===
"I consider the 1917 Tech team the best football I have ever coached", Heisman said. "It's the best team I have seen in my long career as a coach. I was lucky in having under me a team whose members possessed much natural ability and who played the game intelligently. I have never seen a team that, as a whole, was so fast in the composite." For many years, it was considered "the greatest football team the South had ever produced". According to a contemporary New York Sun account, "Georgia Tech looms up as one of the truly great teams of all time."

== Personnel ==
=== Depth chart ===
The following chart provides a visual depiction of Tech's lineup during the 1917 season with games started at the position reflected in parentheses. The chart mimics the offense after the jump shift has taken place.

LE
Shorty Guill (5)
Bill Fincher (2)
Ray Ulrich (2)
Si Bell (1)

LT	LG	C	RG	RT
Bill Fincher (4)	Dan Whelchel (5)	Pup Phillips (7)	Ham Dowling (6)	Walker Carpenter (5)
William Higgins (3)	Bill Fincher (1)	Bill Fincher (1)	J. R. Rogers (1)	William Thweatt (2)
Dan Whelchel (2)	William Higgins (1)	Charles Johnson (1)	William Thweatt (1)	J. R. Rogers (1)
	Clarke Mathes (1)			
	William Thweatt (1)			

RE
Si Bell (5)
Walker Carpenter (3)
Alton Concord (1)

QB
Al Hill (9)

RHB
Joe Guyon (8)
Theodore Shaver (1)

FB
Judy Harlan (6)
Shorty Guill (2)
Armsley (1)

LHB
Everett Strupper (8)
Wally Smith (1)
W. Simpson (0)

=== Varsity letterwinners ===
==== Line ====
Player	Position	Games started	Hometown	Prep school	Height	Weight	Age
Si Bell	End	6	Orchard Hill, Georgia		6'1"	179	22
Walker Carpenter	Tackle	8	Newnan, Georgia		6'2"	184	23
Alton Colcord	End	1	Atlanta, Georgia		5'7"	151	20
Ham Dowling	Guard	6	Savannah, Georgia	University of Florida	5'7"	172	21
Bill Fincher	Tackle, End	8	Spring Place, Georgia	Tech High School	6'0"	188	20
Shorty Guill	End, fullback	7	Sparta, Georgia		5'6"	161	20
William Higgins	Tackle	4	Roswell, New Mexico		5'9"	182	19
Charles Johnson	Guard	1	Atlanta, Georgia		6'0"	184	20
Clarke Mathes	Guard	1	Jonesboro, Georgia		6'1"	186	20
Pup Phillips	Center	7	Carnesville, Georgia		6'0"	182	21
J. R. Rogers	Tackle	2	Memphis, Tennessee		5'10"	180	20
William Thweatt	Guard	3	Pope, Mississippi		6'4"	187	22
Ray Ulrich	End	2	Chicago, Illinois		6'1"	180	19
Dan Whelchel	Guard	7	Ashburn, Georgia		6'1"	198	21

==== Backfield ====
Player	Position	Games started	Hometown	Prep school	Height	Weight	Age
Joe Guyon	Halfback	8	Magdalena, New Mexico	Carlisle Indian Industrial School	5'11"	190	23
Judy Harlan	Fullback	6	Ottumwa, Iowa	Tech High School	5'11"	178	19
Al Hill	Quarterback	9	Washington, Georgia	Washington High School	5'7"	164	20
Everett Strupper	Halfback	8	Columbus, Georgia	Riverside Military Academy	5'9"	156	20

=== Substitutes ===
Player	Position	Games started	Hometown	Prep school	Height	Weight	Age
Armsley	Fullback	1					
Theodore Shaver	Halfback	1	Dayton, Georgia		6'0"	167	21
W. Simpson	Halfback		Atlanta, Georgia		5'8"	171	21
Wally Smith	Halfback	1	Atlanta, Georgia		5'6"	154	20

=== Stats and scoring leaders ===
The following is an incomplete list of statistics and scores, largely dependent on newspaper summaries.

Player	Touchdowns	Extra points	Points	Rushing Yards	Carries
Albert Hill	22	1	133	669	125
Everett Strupper	20	0	120	1,150	102
Joe Guyon	15	8	98	618	84
Bill Fincher	0	49	49	0	0
Judy Harlan	5	0	30	341	59
Shorty Guill	4	1	25	108	12
Wally Smith	2	0	12	0	0
Pup Phillips	1	0	6	0	0
Dan Whelchel	2	0	12	0	0
Si Bell	1	0	6	0	0
TOTAL	72	59	491	2,886	379

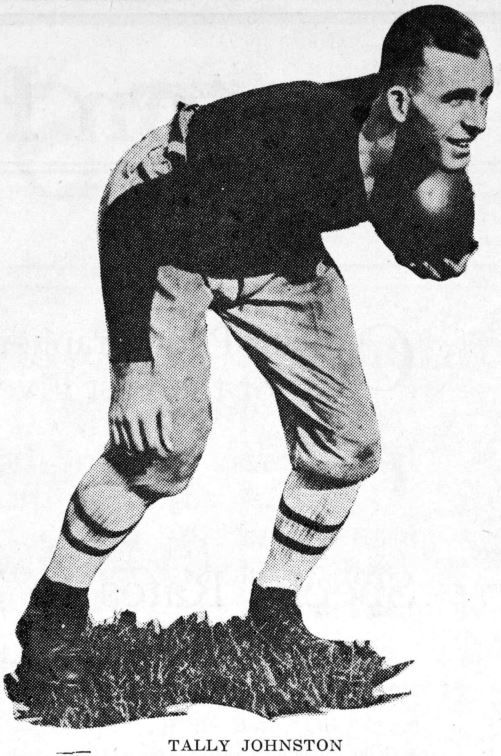
Assistant coach John Tally Johnston

=== Coaching staff ===
- John Heisman, coach
- Charles Guyon, assistant coach
- John Tally Johnston, assistant coach
- W. T. Collins, manager

== See also ==
- 1917 College Football All-America Team
- 1917 College Football All-Southern Team
- List of undefeated NCAA Division I football teams
