= Marshall Guill =

American football and baseball player (1897–1931)

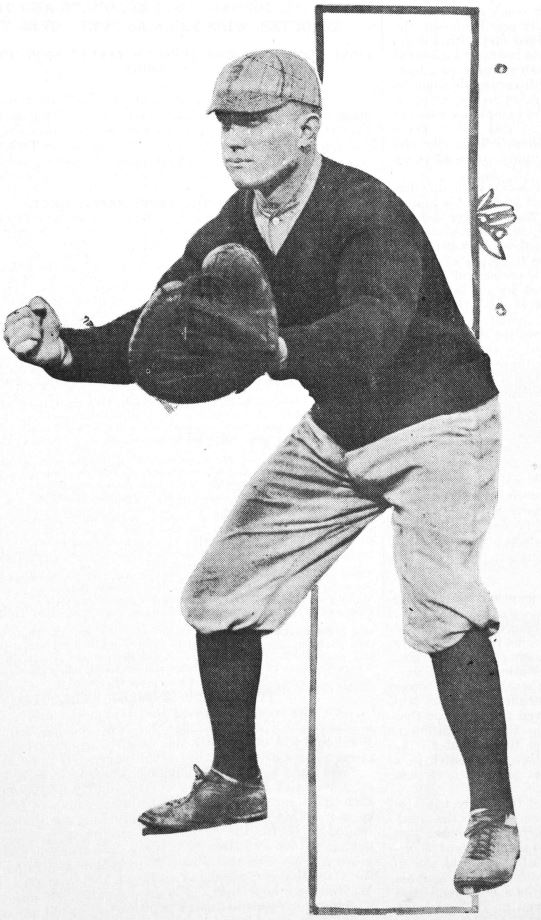
- Guill in 1918

Profile
- Position: End

Personal information
- Born: September 20, 1897; Sparta, Georgia, U.S.
- Died: May 11, 1931 (aged 33); Guilford, Connecticut, U.S.
- Listed height: 5 ft 6 in (1.68 m)
- Listed weight: 161 lb (73 kg)

Career information
- College: Georgia Tech (1914–1919)

Awards and highlights
- National champion (1917); SIAA championship (1916, 1917); All-Southern (1917, 1919)

Marshall Franklin "Shorty" Guill (September 20, 1897 – May 11, 1931) was an American football and baseball player for the Georgia Tech Golden Tornado of the Georgia Institute of Technology. He was a member of the ANAK Society. He graduated with an M. E. in 1918.

== Early life ==
Guill was born in Sparta, Georgia on September 20, 1897 to Marshall Abner Guill and Zella Ada Moore.

== Georgia Tech ==
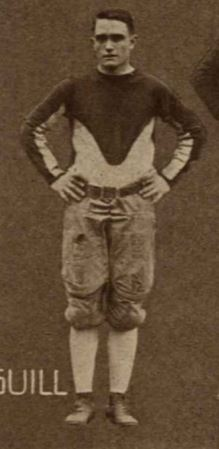
Guill as a member of the 1917 football team

Guill was a prominent quarterback and end on John Heisman's Georgia Tech Golden Tornado football team. He was a second baseman on the baseball team.

=== 1916 ===
He played during Tech's 222–0 rout of Cumberland in 1916.

=== 1917 ===
Guill was a starter for the school's first national championship team in 1917, which outscored opponents 491 to 17.

=== 1919 ===
Guill played as quarterback for much of 1919, shifted to end in the latter part of the year for newcomer Jack McDonough.

== Death ==
He was killed in an automobile collision on the New London-New Haven highway near Guilford, Connecticut on May 11, 1931. At the time of his death he was connected with the American Moistener Corporation of Charlotte, North Carolina.

== See also ==
- List of Georgia Tech Yellow Jackets starting quarterbacks
