= Albert Hill (American football) =

American football player (1896–1969)

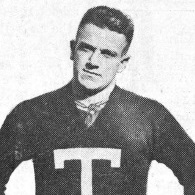
- Hill in 1917 "Buster"

Georgia Tech Yellow Jackets
- Position: Quarterback
- Class: 1917

Personal information
- Born: August 12, 1896; Washington, Georgia, U.S.
- Died: October 13, 1969 (aged 73); Atlanta, Georgia, U.S.
- Listed height: 5 ft 7 in (1.70 m)
- Listed weight: 164 lb (74 kg)

Career information
- High school: Washington
- College: Georgia Tech (1914–1917)

Awards and highlights
- National champion (1917); SIAA championship (1916, 1917); All-Southern (1917); second-team All-American (1917); Georgia Tech Athletics Hall of Fame; Tech All-Era Team (John Heisman Era)

Albert Barnett "Buster" Hill (August 12, 1896 – October 13, 1969) was a college football player.

== Early life ==
Albert Barnett Hill was born on August 12, 1896, in Washington, Georgia, to William Meriwether Hill and Susan Montgomery Stokes. He attended Washington High.

== Georgia Tech ==
Hill entered the Georgia Institute of Technology in 1913. He was a prominent player for John Heisman's Georgia Tech Golden Tornado football teams. Hill was elected to the Georgia Tech Athletics Hall of Fame in 1966.

=== 1917 ===
Hill was the quarterback for Georgia Tech's first national championship team in 1917, which outscored opponents 491 to 17. That year, he received the most carries while leading one of the greatest ever backfields alongside Everett Strupper, Joe Guyon, and Judy Harlan. Hill led the nation in touchdowns. Sometimes simply referred to as the "diminutive quarterback," Hill was selected as a second-team All-American at the end of the 1917 season by Jack Veiock, sports editor of the International News Service (INS). Heisman considered the 1917 team the best one he ever coached, and for many years the team was considered the greatest football team the South ever produced.

== See also ==
- List of Georgia Tech Yellow Jackets starting quarterbacks
