= Ham Dowling =

American football player and engineer (1895–1986)

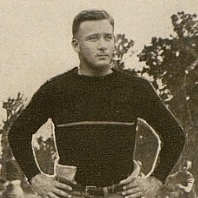
- Dowling at Florida

Profile
- Position: Tackle/Guard

Personal information
- Born: November 12, 1895; Savannah, Georgia, U.S.
- Died: January 28, 1986 (aged 90); Tallahassee, Florida, U.S.
- Listed height: 5 ft 9 in (1.75 m)
- Listed weight: 185 lb (84 kg)

Career information
- High school: Duval
- College: Florida (1915); Georgia Tech (1917–1919)

Awards and highlights
- National champion (1917); SIAA championship (1917, 1918); All-Southern (1919)

James Hamilton "Ham" Dowling (November 12, 1895 – January 28, 1986) was an American college football player and once chief engineer of the Florida State Highway Commission.

== University of Florida ==
Dowling played for the Florida Gators of the University of Florida in 1915.

== Georgia Tech ==
He then transferred to the Georgia Institute of Technology and played for John Heisman's Georgia Tech Golden Tornado. He was a member of the ANAK Society and Alpha Tau Omega fraternity.

=== 1917 ===
Dowling was a member of Georgia Tech's first national championship team in 1917, which outscored opponents 491 to 17.

== Florida State Highway Commission ==
He was once appointed chief engineer of the Florida State Highway Commission in 1933, and served in that capacity until 1946. He was again chief engineer in 1954.

== Bibliography ==
- McEwen, Tom (1974). The Gators: A Story of Florida Football. Huntsville, Alabama: The Strode Publishers. ISBN 0-87397-025-X.
