= Clarke Mathes =

American football player (1897–1934)

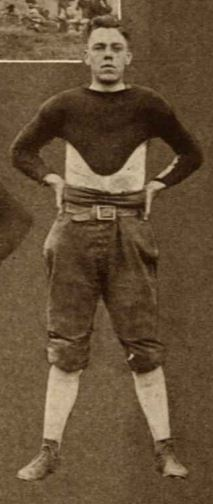
- Mathes as a member of the 1917 football team

Profile
- Position: Guard

Personal information
- Born: August 9, 1897; Jonesboro, Georgia, U.S.
- Died: September 26, 1934 (aged 37); Jonesboro, Georgia, U.S.
- Listed height: 6 ft 1 in (1.85 m)
- Listed weight: 186 lb (84 kg)

Career information
- College: Georgia Tech (1914–1917)

Awards and highlights
- National champion (1917); SIAA championship (1916, 1917)

William Clarke Mathes (August 9, 1897 – September 26, 1934) was an American football player for the Georgia Tech Golden Tornado of the Georgia Institute of Technology. He graduated with an M. E. Mathes was a member of Tech's first national championship team in 1917, which outscored opponents 491 to 17. Mathes enlisted in the United States Marines and joined the First World War soon after that season finished.

== Early life ==
William was born on August 9, 1897, in Jonesboro, Georgia, to Nathaniel Beecher Mathes and Cora Blanche Clarke.

== Later life ==
Mathes died unexpectedly on September 26, 1934, at his home in Jonesboro.
