= Ray Ulrich =

American football player (1898–1950)

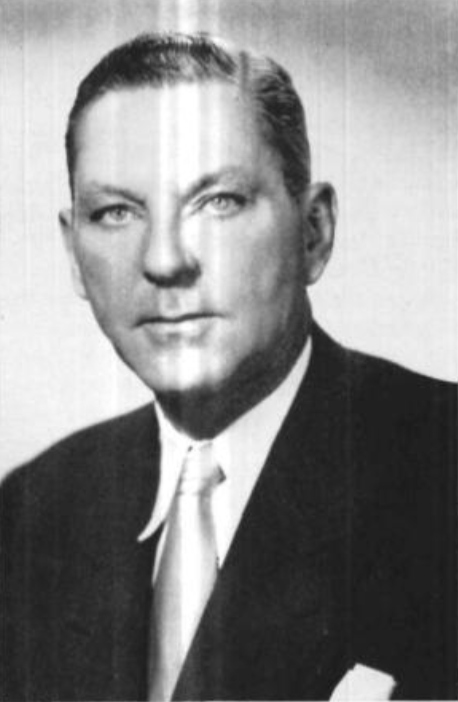
- Ulrich in 1921

Profile
- Position: End

Personal information
- Born: August 28, 1898; Chicago, Illinois, U.S.
- Died: July 11, 1950 (aged 51); Tuscaloosa County, Alabama, U.S.
- Listed height: 6 ft 1 in (1.85 m)
- Listed weight: 180 lb (82 kg)

Career information
- College: Georgia Tech (1917)

Awards and highlights
- National champion (1917)

Raymond Herman Ulrich (August 28, 1898 – July 11, 1950) was an American football player for John Heisman's Georgia Tech Golden Tornado of the Georgia Institute of Technology. He played end on its 1917 team, the first team from the south to win a national championship.
