= Everett Strupper =

American football player (1896–1950)

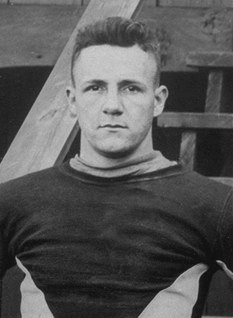

Profile
- Position: Halfback

Personal information
- Born: July 26, 1896; Columbus, Georgia, U.S.
- Died: February 4, 1950 (aged 53); Atlanta, Georgia, U.S.
- Listed height: 5 ft 7 in (1.70 m)
- Listed weight: 148 lb (67 kg)

Career information
- High school: Riverside Military Academy
- College: Georgia Tech (1915–1917)

Awards and highlights
- National champion (1917); 2× SIAA champion (1916, 1917); Southern champion (1915); 3× All-Southern (1915, 1916, 1917); Consensus All-American (1917); Tech All-Era Team (John Heisman Era); Tech Athletics Hall of Fame (1956); Georgia Sports Hall of Fame (1974)

George Everett Strupper Jr. (July 26, 1896 – February 4, 1950), known variously as "Ev" or "Strup" or "Stroop" was an American football player. He played halfback for Georgia Tech from 1915 to 1917. Strupper overcame deafness resulting from a childhood illness and was selected as an All-American in 1917.

During Strupper's three years playing for Georgia Tech, the team compiled a record of 24–0–2 and outscored its opponents by a combined score of 1,135–61. In Georgia Tech's record-setting 222–0 win over Cumberland College in 1916, Strupper scored eight touchdowns. For many years, 1917 Georgia Tech was considered the greatest football team the South ever produced. Strupper starred as part of a renowned backfield including also Joe Guyon, Judy Harlan, and Al Hill. Strupper and teammate Walker Carpenter were the first players from the Deep South selected for an All-America first team.

Sportswriter Morgan Blake called Strupper "probably the greatest running half-back the South has known." Bernie McCarty writes "Strupper ranks among the greatest broken-field gallopers in Southern football history. And he caught and threw passes, returned kicks, blocked well, punted and played a bang-up defensive game." He was posthumously inducted into the College Football Hall of Fame in 1972 and the Georgia Sports Hall of Fame in 1974.

== Early life ==
Strupper was born in Columbus, Georgia, in 1896. His parents, G. Everett Strupper Sr. (born 1872), and Bessie H. (Hatcher) Strupper (born 1875), were both Georgia natives. As of 1910, his father was employed as a manager at a cotton oil company. Stupper attended Riverside Military Academy in Gainesville, Georgia. He was the star of the school's football team in 1913; and is a member of the school's sports hall of fame.

== Georgia Tech ==
Strupper enrolled at the Georgia Institute of Technology (Georgia Tech) in Atlanta in 1914. During his freshman year, Strupper became a member of the Georgia Phi chapter of the Sigma Alpha Epsilon fraternity. He was a multi-sport athlete competing for Georgia Tech in basketball, football, and track and field.

In 1914, Strupper played for the freshman football team at Georgia Tech. He then played halfback for Georgia Tech's varsity football teams under head coach John Heisman from 1915 to 1917. Strupper was deaf, and because of his deafness, he called the signals instead of the team's quarterback. Strupper was a small man, with his height being stated in varying accounts to be between five-feet seven inches and five-feet, ten inches. His coach John Heisman later wrote that Strupper was "but 5 feet 7 inches in height, weighed only 148 pounds stripped." He was sometimes known as "little Everett Strupper."

Georgia Tech never lost a game in which Strupper played, compiling three consecutive undefeated seasons from 1915 to 1917. During Strupper's three years playing for Georgia Tech, the team compiled a record of 24–0–2. Only two teams managed a tie – the University of Georgia in 1915 and Washington & Lee in 1916. In those 26 games, Georgia Tech outscored its opponents by a combined score of 1,135–61.

Georgia Tech coach John Heisman later described Strupper as follows:

"Everett Strupper was a small package of condensed lightning when you turned him loose in an open field with a ball you wanted delivered somewhere in the neighborhood of the enemy's goal line. He was small, but he was put together like a high-powered motor. His arms and legs did just what his mind told them to do, and, believe me, his mind worked faster than Ty Cobb's when he's running the bases. Dodging and twisting, stiff-arming and hipping, he'd run the gauntlet of men big enough, you'd think, to pick him up and spank him, and most of the time, too, he'd get away from them, try as hard as they would."

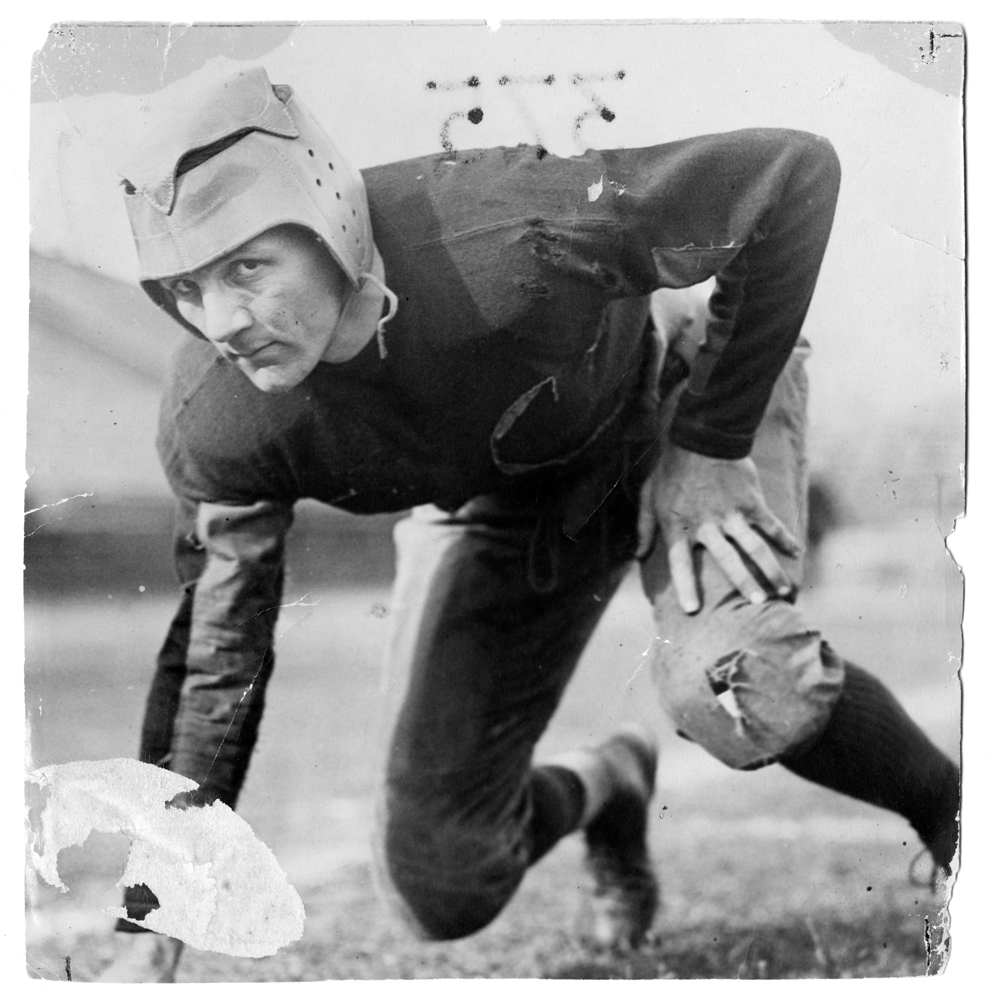
Strupper from Georgia Tech archives

Heisman also said of Strupper "Were I compelled to risk my head on what one absolutely unaided gridster might accomplish, football under arm and facing eleven ferocious opponents, I would rather choose and chance this man on how he might come through the gauntlet than any ball carrier I have ever seen in action."

Heisman recalled that, when Strupper first arrived from Riverside Military Academy, Heisman could not imagine Strupper playing on the football team: "Too light for the line, I didn't see how he could play in the backfield, because he wouldn't be able to get the signals. He could have played quarterback fine, but his enunciation wasn't clear enough for him to call the plays." Heisman recalled how Strupper overcame the obstacle posed by his deafness: "He couldn't hear anything but a regular shout. But he could read your lips like a flash. No lad that ever stepped on a football field had keener eyes than Everett had. The enemy found this out the minute he began looking for openings through which to run the ball." He was nominated though not selected for an Associated Press All-Time Southeast 1869–1919 era team.

=== 1915 season ===
In his sophomore year, Strupper proved to be an all-around athlete. As Heisman told it, Strupper "was a star baseball player, a crack at basketball and the best sprint man we had in the school." Heisman recalled that, despite his small stature, Strupper had a powerful body: "Stripped down in the dressing rooms Everett was a sight to behold. There never was a better set up lad than he; he was a regular Apollo, beautifully muscled and built and coordinating rhythmically in every movement."

When Strupper tried out for the team, he noticed that the quarterback would shout the signals every time Strupper was to carry the ball. Realizing the loud signals would be a tip-off to the opposition, Strupper told Heisman, "Coach, those loud signals are absolutely unnecessary. You see when sickness in my kid days brought on this deafness my folks gave me the best instructors obtainable to teach me lip-reading."

Strupper first starred in a game against Transylvania, scoring four touchdowns. He was injured the next week against LSU, and blamed LSU's Phillip Cooper.

Tech closed what was then the greatest season in its history with a 7–0 defeat of the Auburn Plainsmen. To begin the second quarter, Strupper had two key plays, the last of which was the game-deciding touchdown. First he made 20 yards around with a pass from Froggie Morrison before being forced out of bounds. Next was the 19-yard touchdown. Strupper started around left end, then cut back into the center of the field, away from his blockers. He juked and eluded "every man on the Auburn team." On the last move Strupper faked right and then dove left underneath the outstretched arms of Baby Taylor into the endzone.

At the end of the 1915 season, Strupper received two selections from a composite All-Southern eleven selected by ten sports writers and coaches, including those from Memphis, Nashville, Atlanta, Birmingham, Chattanooga, and New Orleans.

=== 1916 season ===
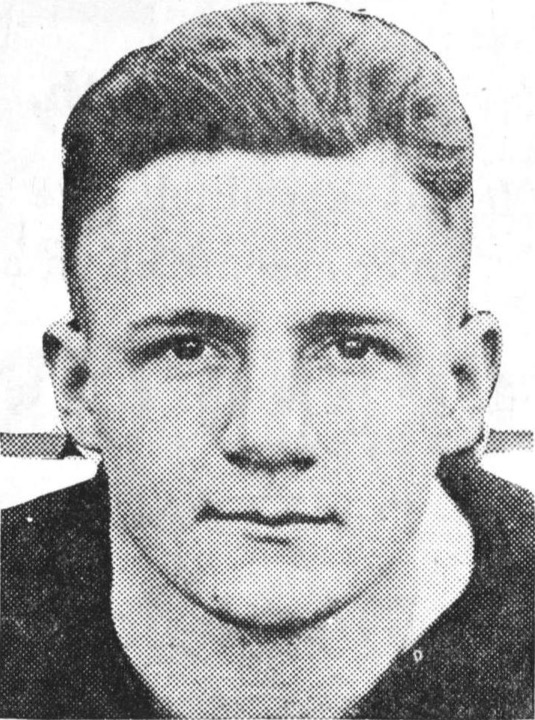
Ev Strupper

In 1916, Strupper had a 92-yard punt return for a touchdown on opening day against Mercer. The next week, Strupper led Georgia Tech in a 222–0 victory over Cumberland College, "the most lopsided game in football history." The score (compiled on 32 touchdowns and 30 extra points) broke the old record of a 153–0 set by the University of Michigan in 1912. Strupper scored eight touchdowns in the game, six rushing and two on punt returns. One historic account of the 1916 Cumberland game described Strupper as the "lord high executioner":

"There were many executioners that crisp early-fall Saturday. Halfback G.E. Strupper scored from 20 yards out on Tech's first offensive play and went on to be lord high executioner with eight touchdowns and a conversion for a total of 49 points."

In the first quarter alone, Strupper scored four touchdowns on runs of 20, 10, 60, and 45 yards. Strupper chose to allow others to share in the scoring. With a 42–0 lead midway through the first quarter, Strupper broke clear and could have scored easily, but he intentionally grounded the ball at the one-yard line to allow Georgia Tech tackle J. Cantey Alexander to score the first touchdown of his career. A teammate later recalled the play as follows:

"Strupper swapped positions with Alexander ... The team didn't want to make it too easy for Cantey, though. The other boys wouldn't block for him or help in any way. As soon as the ball was snapped, they ran away from the line and out of the play completely. Leaving poor Cantey to go it alone. Finally, on fourth down, a bruised and weary Alexander managed to get the ball across while his teammates howled with laughter." (Note: As the score became increasingly lopsided, Strupper was pulled from the game, and substitute halfback Jim Fellers also scored five touchdowns and an extra point.)

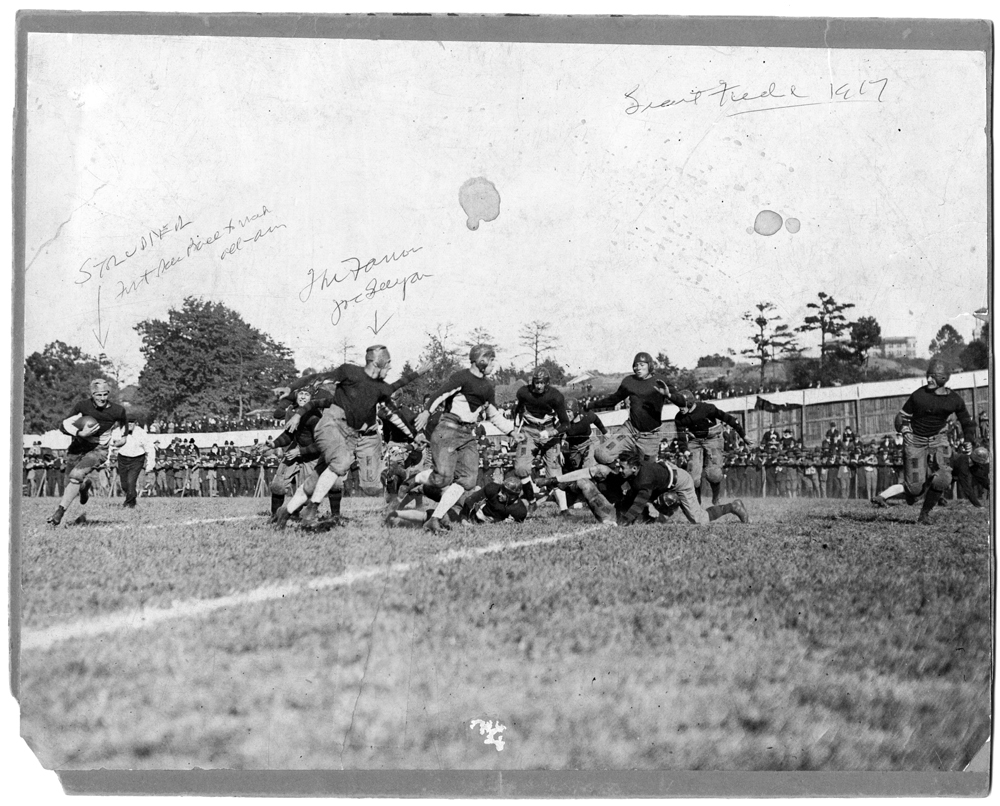
Strupper (far left, with ball) rushing v. Penn.

The game was eventually halted after just 44 minutes of play. It was said only one newspaper in all of the South neglected to have Strupper on its All-Southern team for 1916. He ranked third in the nation in scoring, including 16 touchdowns.

=== 1917 season ===
Strupper also played on the 1917 team then considered the greatest the South ever produced, including one of the greatest backfields. According to the Times-Picayune, "Strupper, Guyon, Hill, and Harlan form a backfield with no superiors and few equals in football history". Tech gave Vanderbilt its worst loss in school history 83–0. "It was not until 1917 that a Southern team really avenged long-time torment at McGugin's hands. And it took one of history's top backfields–Joe Guyon, Ev Strupper, Al Hill, and Judy Harlan of Georgia Tech–to do it," writes Edwin Pope. The team also defeated the University of Pennsylvania, then one of the Eastern powers, 41–0. It was called by one writer "Strupper's finest hour." In a 98–0 win over the Carlisle Indians in 1917, Strupper drew praise for his performance. The Atlanta Journal wrote:

"Everett Strupper played like a veritable demon. At one time four Carlisle men pounced on him from all directions, and yet through some superhuman witchery he broke loose and dashed 10 yards further. On another occasion he attempted a wide end run, found that he was completely blocked, then suddenly whirled and ran the other way, gaining something like 25 yards before he was downed."

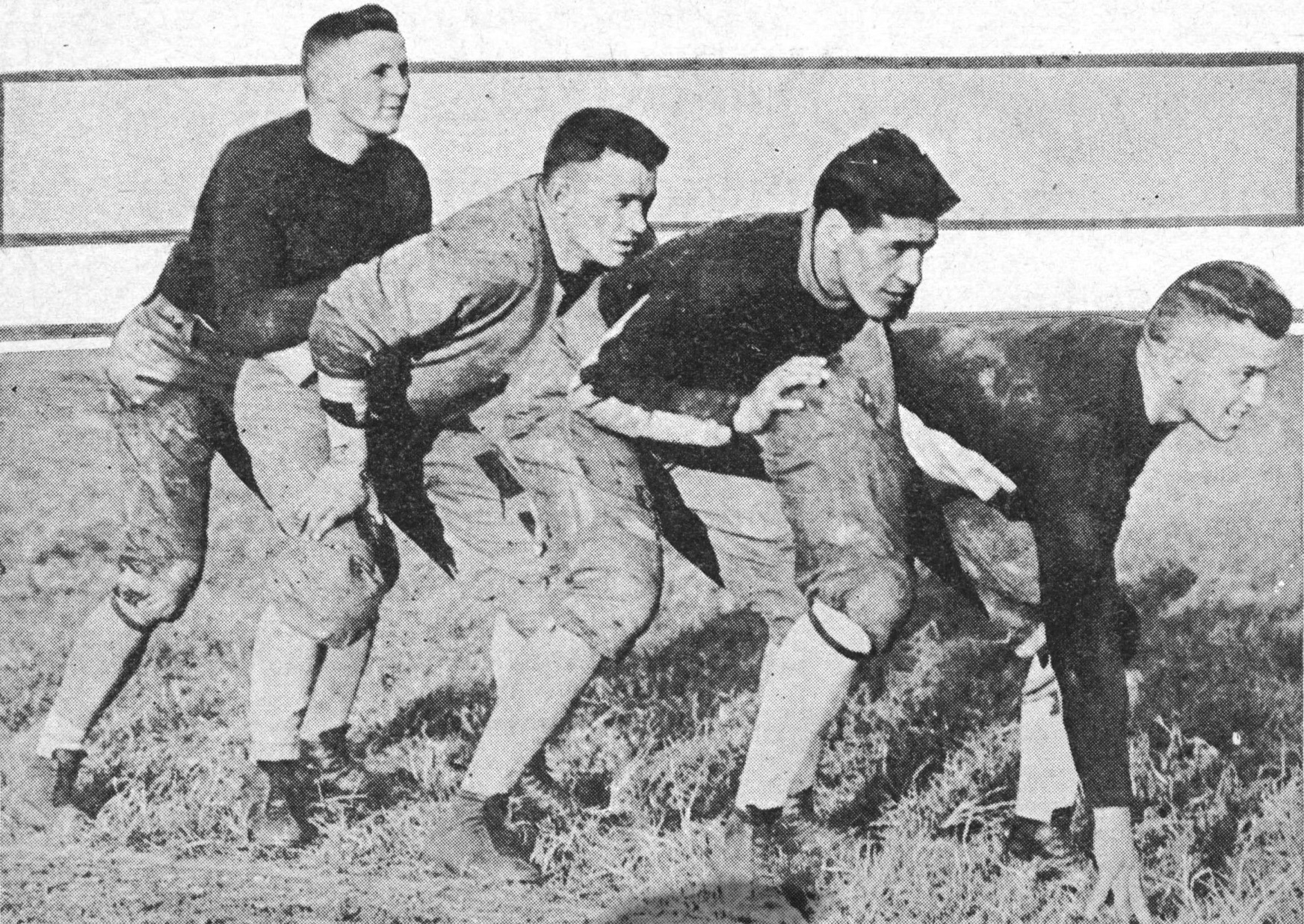
Tech's 1917 backfield; left to right: Strupper, Harlan, Guyon, and Hill

Strupper scored five touchdowns against Carlisle, including a 32-yard fumble return for a touchdown. (Note: This was Carlisle's last season before the school closed.) And in a 68–7 win over rival Auburn, Strupper had a 65-yard touchdown run that drew the following praise from the Atlanta Journal:

"It was not the length of the run that featured it was the brilliance of it. After getting through the first line, Stroop was tackled squarely by two secondary men, and yet he squirmed and jerked loosed from them, only to face the safety man and another Tiger, coming at him from different angles. Without checking his speed Everett knifed the two men completely, running between them and dashing on to a touchdown."

Remarkably, two Georgia Tech players led the country in touchdowns for the 1917 season. Quarterback Albert Hill was first with 23 touchdowns, and Strupper was second with 20 touchdowns. Strupper rushed for some 1,150 yards on a little over 100 carries.

Strupper has been recognized as a consensus first-team player on the 1917 College Football All-America Team, having received first-team honors from Frank Menke Syndicate, Paul Purman, and Dick Jemison of the Atlanta Constitution. Strupper and team captain Walker Carpenter were the first players from the Deep South selected for an All-America first team. Strupper was named as one of four backs on Georgia Tech's "All-Era" team for the Heisman era covering the years from 1904 to 1919.

== Military football and coaching ==
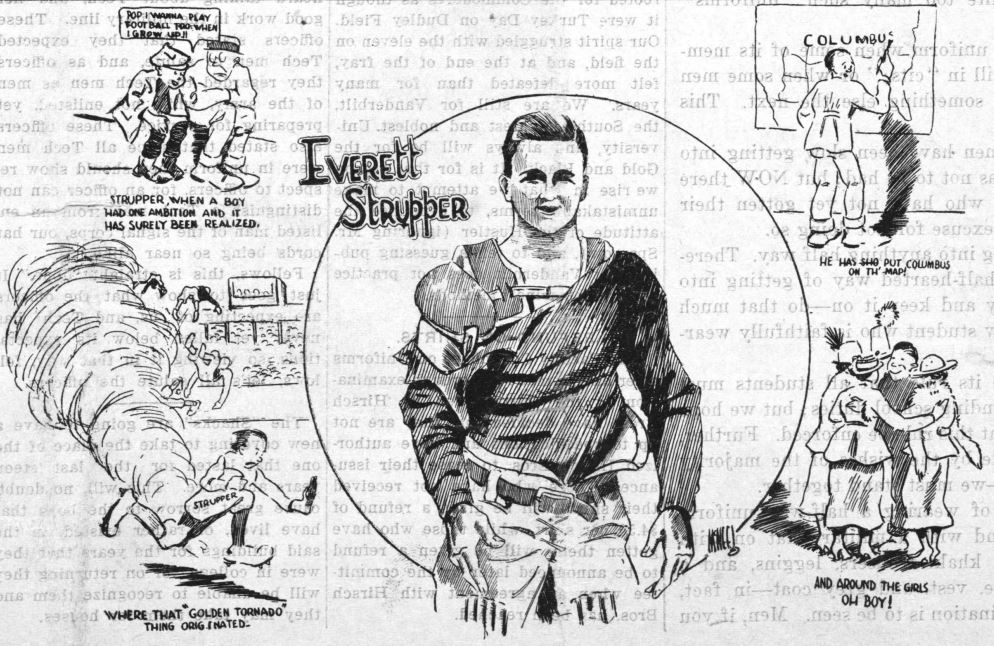
Cartoon of Strupper published in the Technique, 1917

On December 8, 1917, Strupper was elected by his teammates to be the captain of the 1918 Georgia Tech football team. However, Strupper enlisted in the U. S. Army on August 28, 1918, and was assigned to the First Replacement Regiment at Camp Gordon in Chamblee, Georgia. In October 1918, Strupper transferred to Camp Hancock and promoted to the rank of sergeant. He played football for Camp Gordon and Camp Hancock teams. In November 1918, Camp Gordon played a game in Strupper's home town of Columbus, Georgia, and the locals held "Strupper Day" in his honor. In a game for Camp Gordon on December 7, 1918, he had two runs of 80 yards and scored four touchdowns. At the end of the season, he was picked as a second-team halfback on Walter Camp's All-America service team.

The war ended in November 1918, and Strupper was discharged from the Army on December 20, 1918, as part of the post-war demobilization. In August 1919, Strupper accepted a job as the backfield coach for Oglethorpe University. He next led the Columbus High School football team. Strupper was an assistant coach under Josh Cody at Mercer in 1922.

== Family and later years ==
Strupper was married in approximately 1920 to his wife, Odelle. As of 1921, Strupper was living in Columbus, Georgia, working as a salesman for E. F. Gray. From at least 1925 to 1928, Strupper was living in Columbus with his wife, Odelle, and operating a tire business under the name Everett Strupper, Inc. The business sold Dunlop Tires and also provided vulcanizing, road service, washing, greasing and oil.

By 1930, Strupper and his wife, Odelle, had moved to Atlanta where he was employed as the sales manager for an automobile accessories business. He was also a contributor to the Atlanta Journal. Although there are competing stories as to the origin of the Red Elephant mascot for the University of Alabama, some sources have cited a story written by Strupper about an October 1930 football game between Alabama and Mississippi. Strupper wrote: "At the end of the quarter, the earth started to tremble, there was a distant rumble that continued to grow. Some excited fan in the stands bellowed, 'Hold your horses, the elephants are coming,' and out stamped this Alabama varsity."

By 1934, he was working as a solicitor for the Massachusetts Mutual Life Insurance Company. He worked with former teammate, Pup Phillips, at Massachusetts Mutual. As of 1941, Strupper was still living in Atlanta and employed by Massachusetts Mutual. His spouse, apparently a second wife, was identified as Frances C. Strupper.

Strupper later became a general agent for the Volunteer State Life Insurance Company, and by 1948, he became the president of the Piedmont Life Insurance Co. based in Atlanta.

Strupper died at his home in Atlanta's Georgian Terrace Hotel in February 1950 from thrombosis. He was age 57 at the time of his death. He was survived by a wife and a step-daughter, Gwyneth Oliver. He was buried in Columbus, Georgia.

In 1972, the National Football Foundation named Strupper and nine others players who played before 1920 to the "Pioneer" section of the College Football Hall of Fame. He was also inducted into the Georgia Tech Athletics Hall of Fame in 1956 and the Georgia Sports Hall of Fame in 1974.
