= Bill Fincher =

American football player and coach (1896–1978)

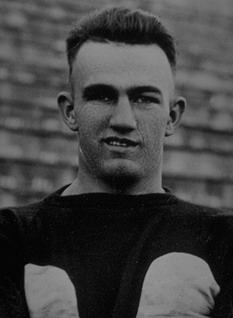

Biographical details
- Born: November 12, 1896; Spring Place, Georgia, U.S.
- Died: July 17, 1978 (aged 81); Atlanta, Georgia, U.S.

Playing career
- 1916–1920: Georgia Tech
- Positions: End, tackle, placekicker

Coaching career (HC unless noted)
- 1921: William & Mary
- 1925–1931: Georgia Tech (line)

Head coaching record
- Overall: 4–3–1

Accomplishments and honors

Championships
- National (1917)

Awards
- 3× All-Southern (1917, 1919, 1920); 2× Consensus All-American (1918, 1920); Tech All-Era Team (John Heisman Era)
- College Football Hall of Fame; Inducted in 1974 (profile)

William Enoch Fincher (November 12, 1896 – July 17, 1978) was an American college football player and coach. He played the end and tackle positions for the Georgia Tech Golden Tornado football team of the Georgia Institute of Technology. Fincher was inducted into the College Football Hall of Fame as a player in 1974.

== Early years ==
Fincher was born in Spring Place, Georgia. He attended old Tech High School in Atlanta.

== Georgia Tech ==
Fincher attended Georgia Institute of Technology, graduating with a mechanical engineering degree in 1921. At school, he played football, basketball, and ran track. He was a prominent tackle and end for the Georgia Tech Golden Tornado football teams. Fincher could play any position on the line in the complicated Heisman shift offense. He made a record 122 of 136 PAT attempts. He stood 6 feet tall and weighed 182 pounds. He was nominated though not selected for an Associated Press All-Time Southeast 1869–1919 era team.

Fincher had a glass eye which he would covertly pull out after feigning an injury, turn to his opponents and say: "So that's how you want to play!"

=== 1916 ===
Fincher was a substitute for the 222 to 0 rout of Cumberland in 1916.

=== 1917 ===
He was a starter for the 1917 national championship team. The 1917 team was Tech's first national championship and outscored opponents 491 to 17, and for many years it was considered the greatest football team the South ever produced. Fincher kicked 49 extra points.

=== 1918 ===
He was a consensus All-American in 1918, a year in which he was captain.

=== 1920 ===
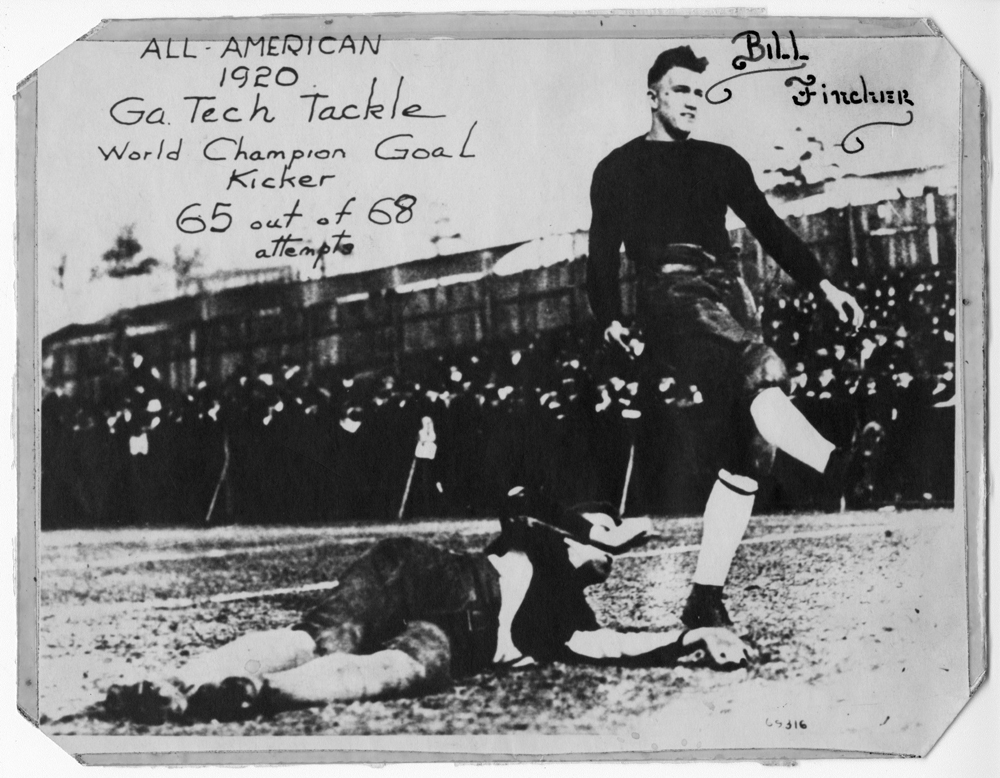
Fincher kicking from placement.

In 1920 he made Walter Camp's first team All-American, a rarity for a player from the South.

One writer said Fincher "seemingly ate ten-penny nails" and "was the 'meanest' lineman I ever witnessed in action." A story goes that he sought to knock Bo McMillin out of the Centre–Tech game, taking with him brass-knuckles or "something equally diabolical." Before the game, Fincher said "You're a great player Bo...I feel awful sorry about it because you are not going to be in there very long—about three minutes."

Fincher also once held a charging Model-T for no gain. The yearbook remarks "Bill began his great work on the sand lots of Tech Hi here in Atlanta years ago and ended it up by smearing "Fatty" Warren of the Auburn Tigers all over the flats of Grant Field on Turkey Day last."

== Coaching ==
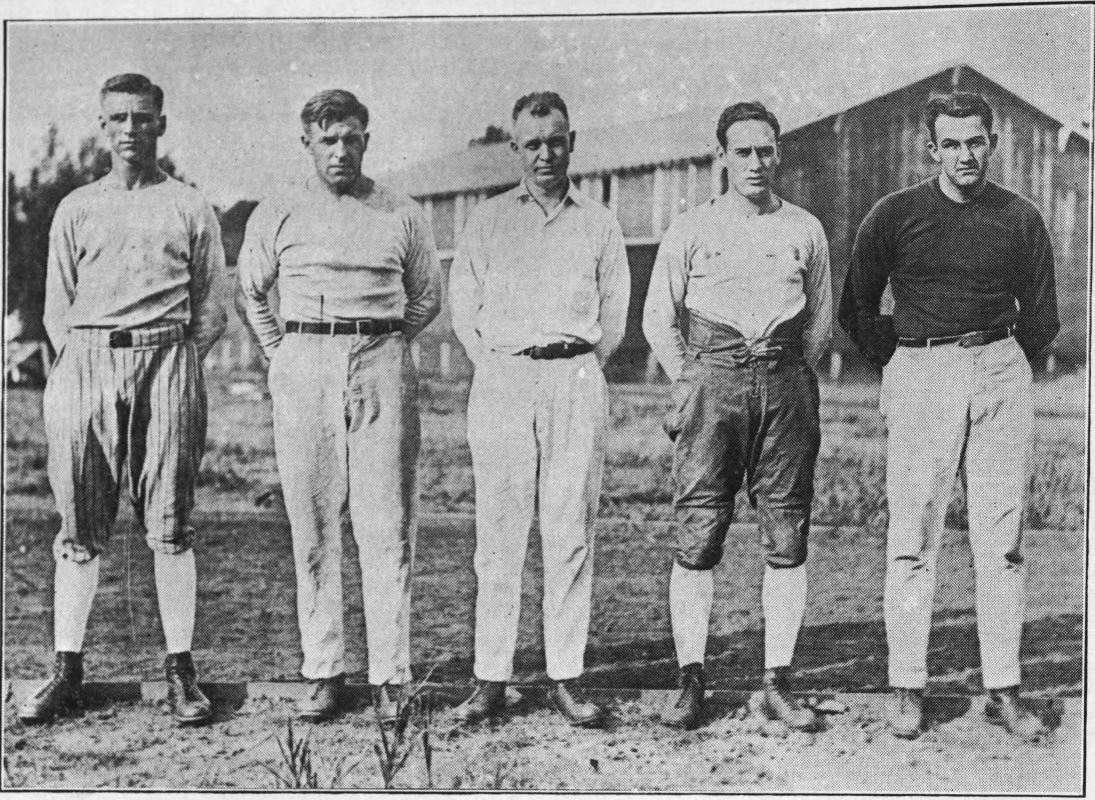
Fincher (far right), with other members of Tech's 1925 coaching staff. Head coach William Alexander is center.

Fincher was head coach of a college football team for one season. In 1921, he led the William & Mary Indians football team to a 4–3–1 record. In 1925, he joined Georgia Tech's coaching staff as a line coach, replacing Fay Wood. He was still a line coach for the school through 1927.

== Head coaching record ==
Year	Team	Overall	Conference	Standing	Bowl/playoffs
William & Mary Indians (South Atlantic Intercollegiate Athletic Association) (1921)
1921	William & Mary	4–3–1	1–3–1	11th	
William & Mary:		4–3–1	1–3–1		
Total:		4–3–1			
