= Dan Whelchel =

American football player and fruit horticulturalist (1894–1988)

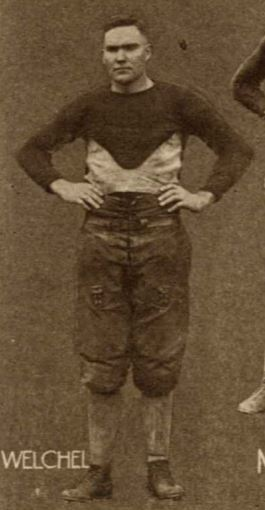
- Whelchel as a member of the 1917 football team

Profile
- Position: Guard

Personal information
- Born: August 26, 1894; Dawson County, Georgia, U.S.
- Died: March 1, 1988 (aged 93); West Helena, Arkansas, U.S.
- Listed height: 6 ft 0 in (1.83 m)
- Listed weight: 194 lb (88 kg)

Career information
- College: Georgia Tech (1917–1919)

Awards and highlights
- National champion (1917)

Dan Whelchel (August 26, 1894 – March 1, 1988) was a college football player and fruit horticulturalist.

== Early life ==
Dan Whelchel was born in Dawson County, Georgia on August 26, 1894, to Jordan Davis Whelchel and Amanda Jane Palmour. At the time of his enrollment at Tech he was living in Ashburn, Georgia. Dan was a first cousin of All-Southern Georgia Bulldogs football player Hugh Whelchel.

== Georgia Tech ==
Whelchel was a prominent guard for John Heisman's Georgia Tech Golden Tornado of the Georgia Institute of Technology.

=== 1917 ===
He was a member of the school's first national championship team in 1917, having to join the American effort in the First World War before he got to celebrate.

== Horticulturalist ==
Whelchel later was a fruit horticulturalist in Arkansas, specializing in nuts.
