= Drop-back pass =

American football term

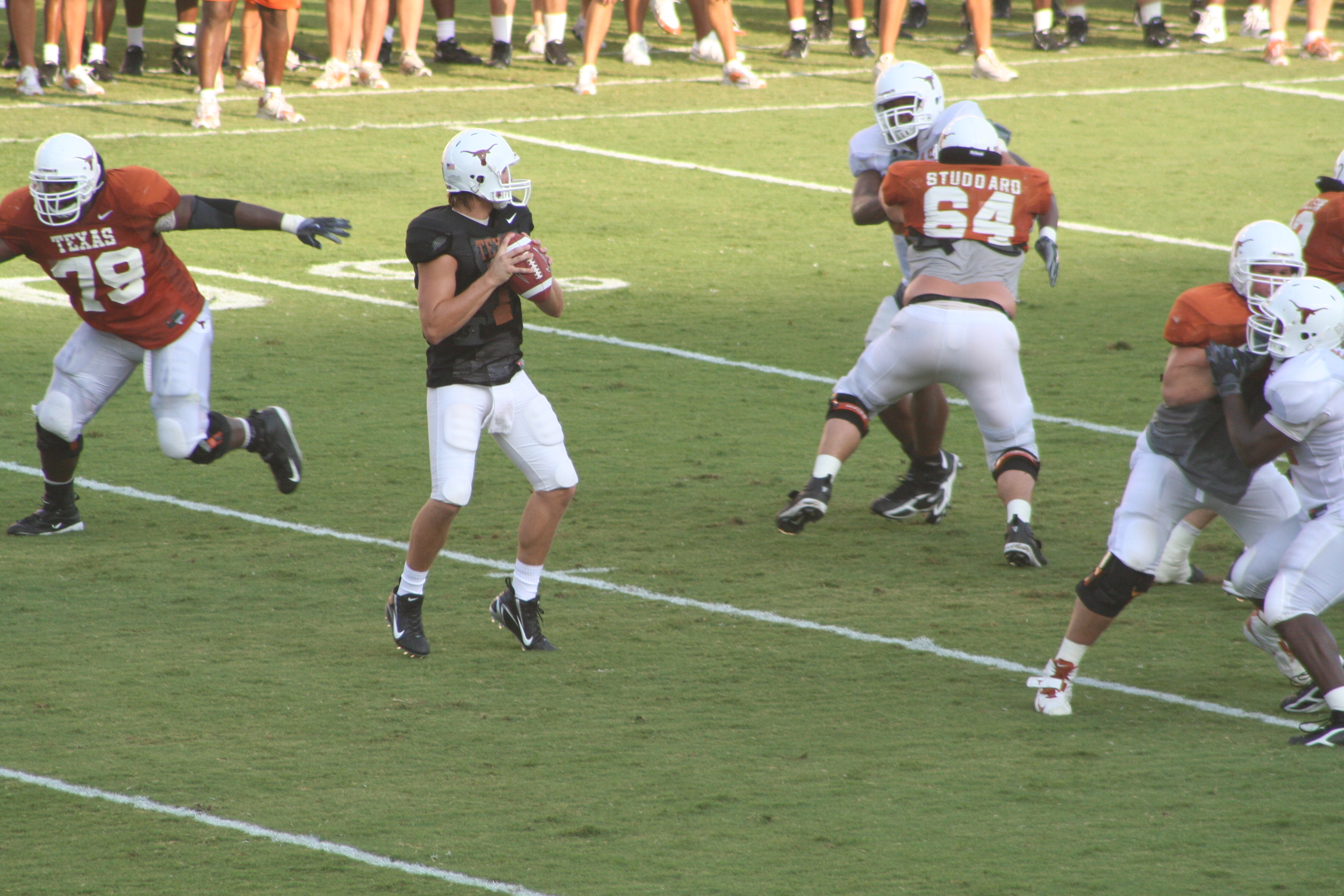
A quarterback at practice, dropping back to pass.

A drop-back pass or dropping back to pass is a passing style employed in gridiron football in which the quarterback initially takes a three-step drop, backpedaling into the pocket to make a pass. It is the most common way of passing the ball in gridiron football. Kinds include a three-step drop, a five-step drop, and a seven-step drop.
