= Si Bell =

American football player (1894–1972)

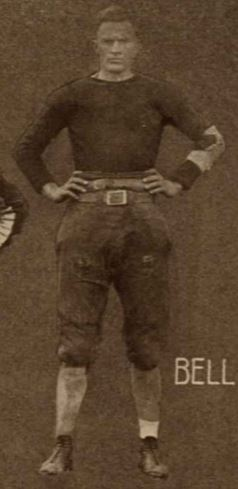
- Bell as a member of the 1917 Georgia Tech football team

Profile
- Position: End

Personal information
- Born: April 18, 1894; Orchard Hill, Georgia, U.S.
- Died: March 12, 1972 (aged 77); Gainesville, Georgia, U.S.
- Listed height: 6 ft 1 in (1.85 m)
- Listed weight: 179 lb (81 kg)

Career information
- College: Georgia Tech (1915–1917)

Awards and highlights
- National champion (1917); SIAA championship (1916, 1917); All-Southern (1916, 1917)

Robert Strickland "Si" Bell (April 18, 1894 – March 12, 1972) was a college football player.

== Georgia Tech ==
Bell was prominent end for the Georgia Tech Golden Tornado of the Georgia Institute of Technology. He was twice selected All-Southern.

=== 1916 ===
Bell was a starter for the 222–0 rout of Cumberland.

=== 1917 ===
He was also a member of Tech's first national championship team in 1917 which outscored opponents 491 to 17. Bell left to join the American effort in the First World War as a marine just a week after celebrating the national championship.
