= Judy Harlan =

American football player (1896–1978)

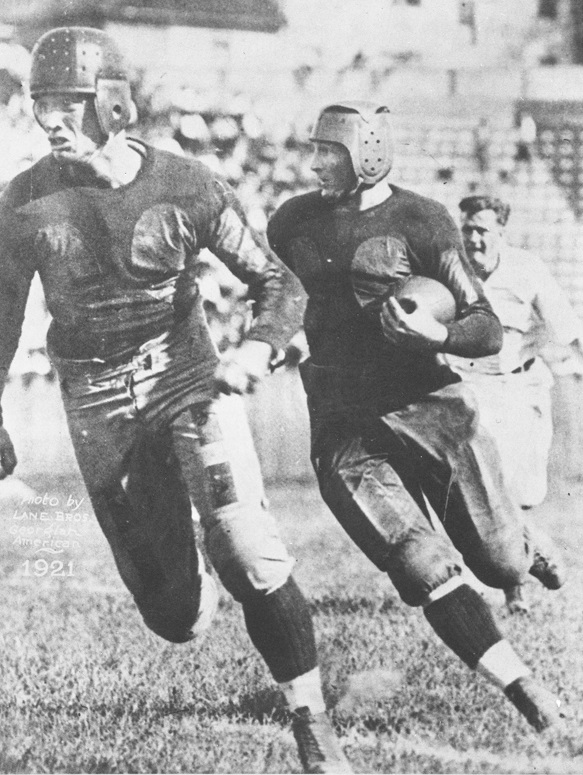
- Harlan running interference for Red Barron

Profile
- Position: Fullback
- Class: 1921

Personal information
- Born: November 6, 1896; Ottumwa, Iowa, U.S.
- Died: May 20, 1978 (aged 81); Springfield, Missouri, U.S.
- Listed height: 5 ft 11 in (1.80 m)
- Listed weight: 182 lb (83 kg)

Career information
- High school: Technical
- College: Georgia Tech (1917, 1919–1921); Cleveland Naval Reserve (1918)

Awards and highlights
- National champion (1917); SIAA championship (1917, 1920, 1921); Third-team All-American (1921); All-Southern (1919, 1921); Georgia Tech Athletics Hall of Fame

Julian Washington "Judy" Harlan Jr. (November 6, 1896 – May 20, 1978) was an American college football player for the Georgia Tech Golden Tornado football of the Georgia Institute of Technology. He was the fullback in Georgia Tech's famous backfield of 1917, and was also a Georgia Tech track athlete.

== Georgia Tech ==
Harlan was a prominent running back for John Heisman's and William Alexander's Georgia Tech Golden Tornado football team of the Georgia Institute of Technology, called by some the school's greatest back. Playing in the days before two platoons, Harlan was also one of the best defensive backs in the country.

=== 1917 ===
Coming from old Tech High, Harlan was a fullback on the school's famous backfield of 1917, alongside halfbacks Everett Strupper and Joe Guyon, and quarterback Albert Hill. Harlan often blocked for Strupper or Guyon, performing notably as a freshman having to fill the void left by Tommy Spence. The 1917 team won Georgia Tech's first national championship and outscored opponents 491 to 17. Harlan was a member of the school's ANAK Society.

Harlan once spoke of Joe Guyon, a full blooded Indian, and his antics: "Once in a while the Indian would come out in Joe, such as the nights Heisman gave us a white football and had us working out under the lights. That's when Guyon would give out the blood curdling war whoops."

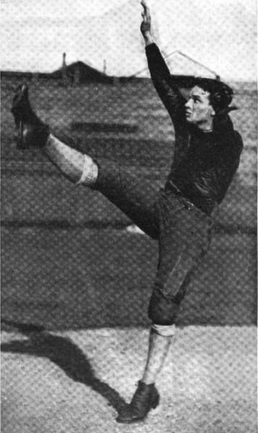
Harlan punting c. 1921

=== 1918 ===
Due to the First World War, Harlan was also a teammate of Auburn great Moon Ducote on the 1918 Cleveland Naval Reserves which upset national champion Pittsburgh by a 10 to 9 score. Pittsburgh had beaten Georgia Tech 32 to 0 after declining an offer to play the year before. Ducote kicked the winning field goal. Harlan stated: "I intercepted a pass and returned it to midfield in the fourth quarter. I felt I at least had evened up some of the losses we had at Tech."

=== 1919 ===
Harlan came into his own upon returning to Tech for the 1919 season, "the line plunger almost unfailingly good for "must" yardage to keep a drive rolling."

=== 1921 ===
Harlan was captain of the Tech team in 1921. Former Tech fullback Sam Murray, who played behind Doug Wycoff, was asked about a certain strong runner in the 1930s, "He's good. But if I were playing again, I would have one wish – never to see bearing down upon me a more fearsome picture of power than Judy Harlan blocking for Red Barron." Harlan was inducted into the Georgia Tech Athletics Hall of Fame in 1960.
