= Fay Wood (American football) =

American football player and coach

Biographical details
- Born: Syracuse, New York

Playing career
- 1907–1909: Notre Dame
- Position: End

Coaching career (HC unless noted)
- 1918–1920: Georgia Tech (line)

Fay F. Wood was a college football player and coach. A native of Syracuse, he played for the Notre Dame Fighting Irish as an end from 1907 to 1909, catching the first touchdown pass in the history of Notre Dame football. He was later the line coach under John Heisman and later William Alexander at Georgia Tech.
