= Joe Guyon =

American football player and coach, baseball player and coach (1892–1971)

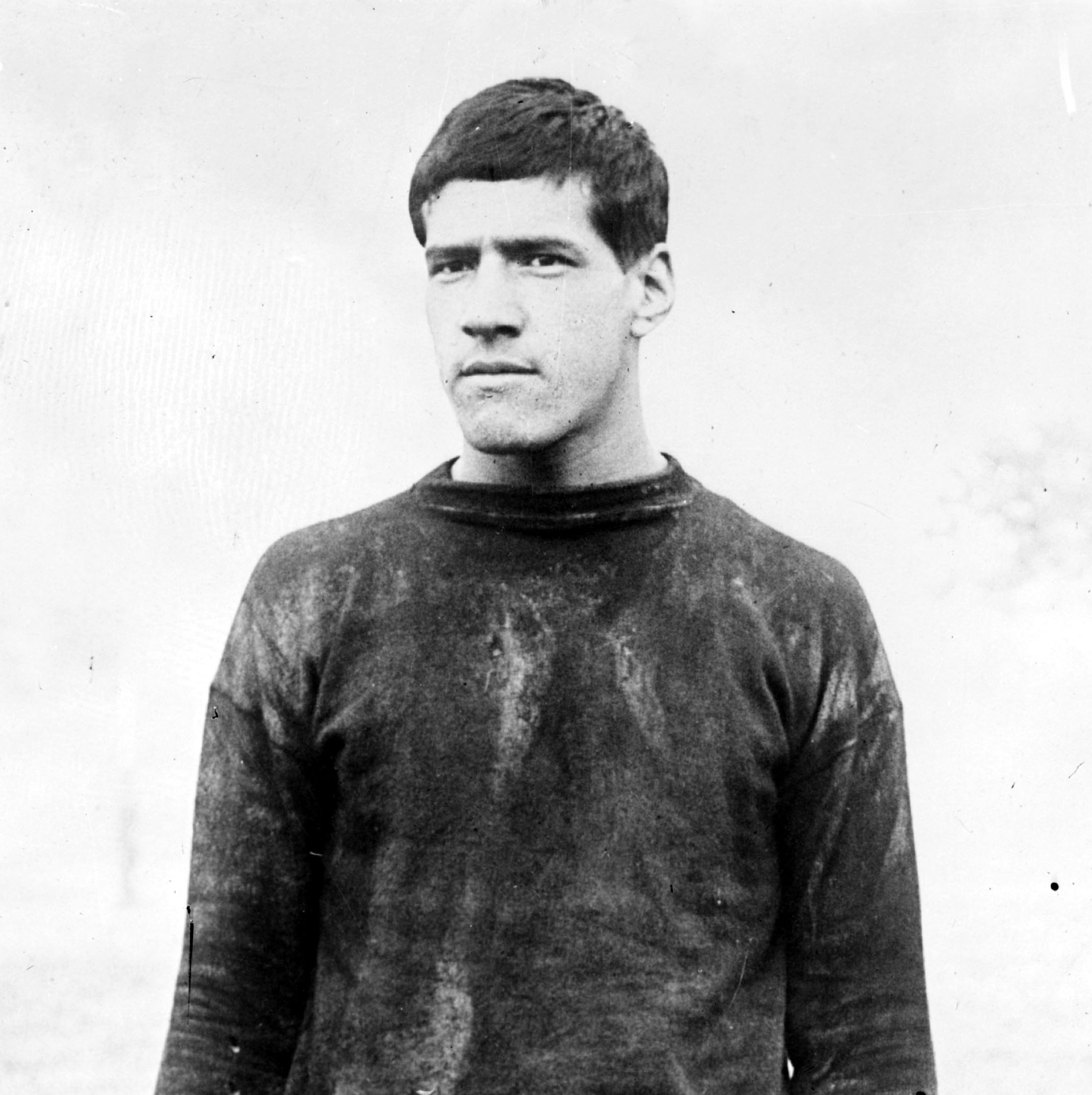
- Guyon at Carlisle in 1913

No. 11, 10, 26, 3, 14, 18
- Positions: Tackle, halfback

Personal information
- Born: November 26, 1892; White Earth, Minnesota, U.S.
- Died: November 27, 1971 (aged 79); Louisville, Kentucky, U.S.
- Listed height: 5 ft 10 in (1.78 m)
- Listed weight: 195 lb (88 kg)

Career information
- High school: Keewatin Academy (Prairie du Chien, Wisconsin)
- College: Carlisle, Georgia Tech

Career history
- Canton Bulldogs (1919–1920); Washington Senators (1921); Union Quakers of Philadelphia (1921); Cleveland Indians (1921); Oorang Indians (1922–1923); Rock Island Independents (1924); Kansas City Cowboys (1925); New York Giants (1927)

Awards and highlights
- NFL champion (1927); Second-team All-Pro (1920); Third-team All-Pro (1924); National champion (1917); 2× SIAA champion (1917, 1918); Consensus All-American (1918); 2× Second-team All-American (1913, 1917); All-Southern (1917); Tech All-Era Team (John Heisman era); AP Southeast Area All-Time football team 1869–1919 era

Career NFL statistics
- Touchdowns: 10
- Games played: 46
- Stats at Pro Football Reference
- Pro Football Hall of Fame
- College Football Hall of Fame

Joseph Napoleon "Big Chief" Guyon (Anishinaabe: O-Gee-Chidah, translated as "Big Brave"; November 26, 1892 – November 27, 1971) was an American Indian from the Ojibwa tribe (Chippewa) who was an American football and baseball player and coach. He played college football at the Carlisle Indian Industrial School from 1912 to 1913 and Georgia Tech from 1917 to 1918 and with a number of professional clubs from 1919 to 1927. He was inducted into the Pro Football Hall of Fame in 1966 and the College Football Hall of Fame in 1971.

== Early life ==
Guyon was born on the White Earth Indian Reservation in White Earth, Minnesota. He received only a sixth-grade education from the American government. Guyon also spent time in Magdalena, New Mexico.

== Football career ==
=== College ===
==== Carlisle ====
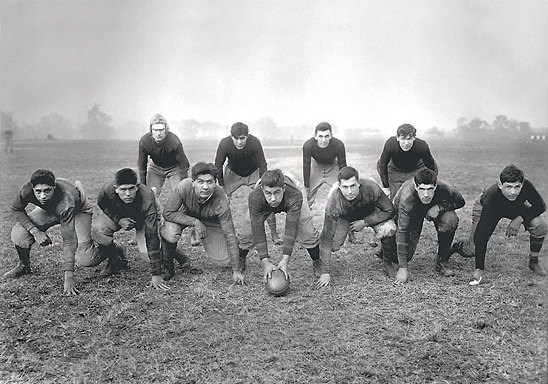
Guyon with the 1912 Carlisle Indians

Guyon attended and played college football at the Carlisle Indian Industrial School from 1912 to 1913 under head coach Pop Warner. Sportswriters often tried to call him "Injun Joe" after the character in The Adventures of Tom Sawyer, but it never much caught on outside the press.

The 1912 team posted a 12–1–1 record, scored 454 points, and was Jim Thorpe's greatest season. Guyon played on the team as left tackle. In the game against Army featuring the likes of future US President Dwight D. Eisenhower, Leland Devore was ejected for manhandling Guyon.

The 1913 team went 10–1–1, scoring 296 points. Guyon shifted to Thorpe's place at halfback and was honored by Walter Camp as a second-team All-American.

==== Keewatin ====
From 1914 to 1915, Guyon attended the Keewatin Academy in Prairie du Chien, Wisconsin, to regain college eligibility.

==== Georgia Tech ====
Guyon then attended and played football at Georgia Tech from 1917 to 1918 under head coach John Heisman. (Note: From 1914 to 1918, Georgia Tech had a 69-game unbeaten streak, during which in four (nonconsecutive) games of the streak Georgia Tech scored 222, 128, 119, and then 118.) Guyon was used mainly as a halfback. His brother Charles "Wahoo" Guyon was the assistant coach. For his time spent playing at Georgia Tech, Guyon was a unanimous selection for an Associated Press Southeast Area All-Time football team 1869-1919 era. Fullback Judy Harlan said about Guyon, "Once in a while the Indian would come out in Joe, such as the nights Heisman gave us a white football and had us working out under the lights. That's when Guyon would give out the blood curdling war whoops."

===== 1917 =====
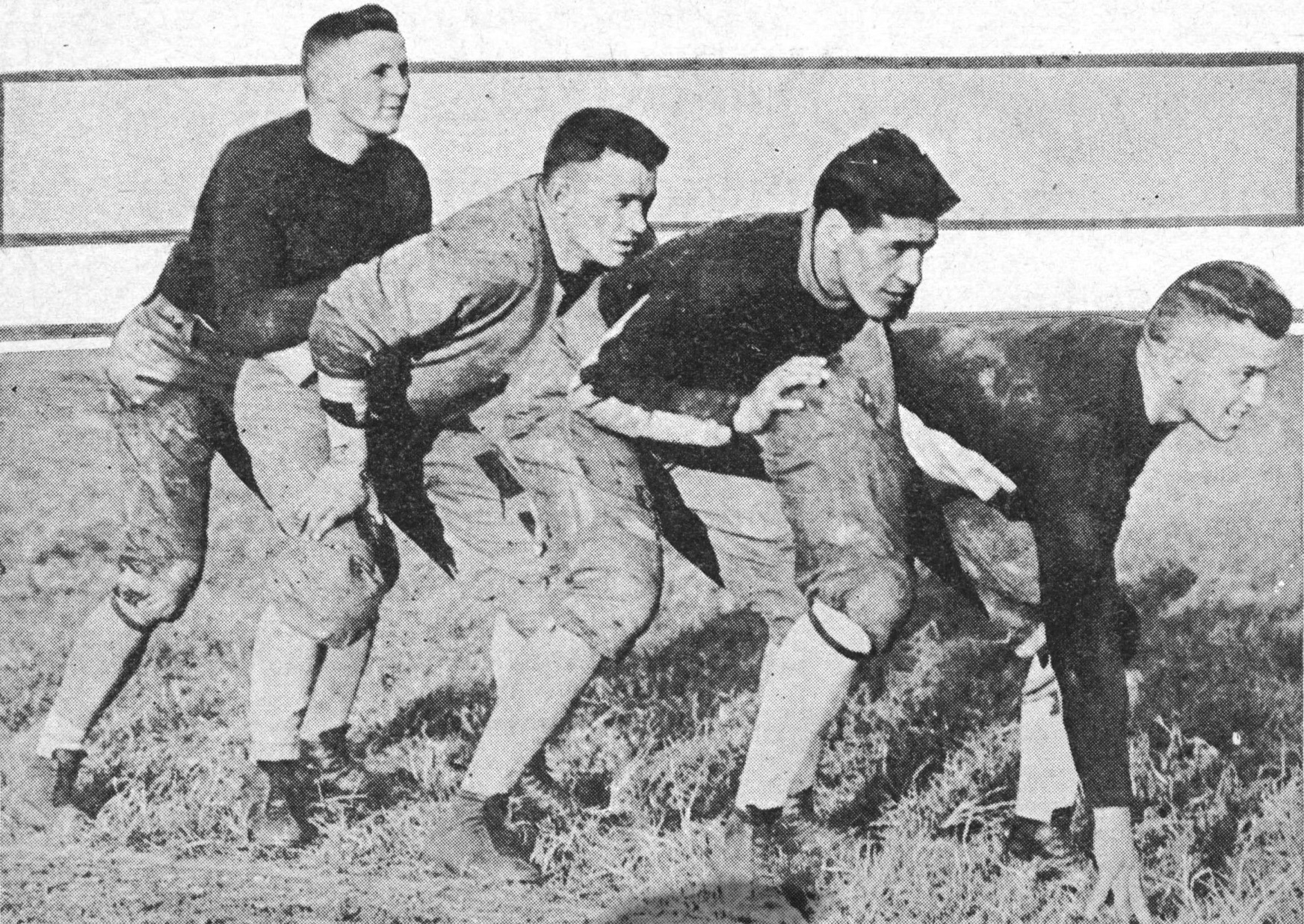
Tech's 1917 backfield; left to right: Strupper, Harlan, Guyon, and Hill

The 1917 team went 9–0, scored 491 points, was crowned national champion, and was for many years considered "the greatest the South ever produced." Guyon played right halfback, where he was the team's power back and best passer. He was a unanimous All-Southern selection, and considered by some the South's best back. His first run from scrimmage for Tech was a 75-yard touchdown against Wake Forest.

In a 63–0 rout of Washington & Lee, Guyon knocked a Washington & Lee player out of the game by "wearing an old horse collar shaped into a shoulder pad but reinforced with a little steel" according to Judy Harlan. (Note: The player may have been Turner Bethel, who was knocked out of the game and taken to a local hospital.) Against Vanderbilt University he had arguably his greatest game, running 12 times for 344 yards in an 83–0 blowout. According to sportswriter Morgan Blake, "Guyon has been great in all games this year. But Saturday he was the superman".

Against Tulane, each of the four members of the backfield eclipsed 100 yards rushing. "Strupper, Guyon, Hill, and Harlan form a backfield with no superiors and few equals in football history" wrote the Times-Picayune. He passed for two touchdowns and ran for one, passing 91 yards and running 112: "Guyon's passing was so accurate it suggest possibilities yet undeveloped in the Tech offense". In the large, 68–7 win over Auburn, Guyon once dove at its star Moon Ducote and missed, but Guyon gave chase from behind and tackled him at the 26-yard line.

===== 1918 =====
The 1918 team went 6–1, scoring 462. Guyon was used mainly as a fullback, though sometimes as a tackle. He was honored as a tackle on Frank G. Menke's first All-America team.

=== Professional ===
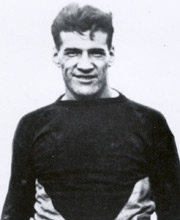
Guyon as a professional player

Guyon signed to play professional football with the Canton Bulldogs in 1919. After the NFL was organized in 1920, he played seven more seasons with the Washington Senators, Cleveland Indians, Oorang Indians, Rock Island Independents, Kansas City Cowboys, and the New York Giants. From 1919 to 1924, he teamed with another outstanding Indian halfback, Jim Thorpe. They parted ways late in the 1924 season when Guyon left the Independents to go to Kansas City. He stayed with the Cowboys in 1925 while Thorpe went to the Giants.

Then in 1927, Guyon joined the Giants and helped lead the team to the 1927 NFL Championship.

=== Coaching ===
Guyon coached the Bulldogs of Union University in Jackson, Tennessee in 1919. He returned to Union in 1923 and coached all sports from 1923 to 1927. Union inducted Guyon into its sports hall of fame in 2008.

Guyon coached the backfield of the 1920 Georgia Tech team. He also coached high school football at St. Xavier High School in Louisville, Kentucky from 1931 to 1933, with a 16–7–2 record.

== Baseball career ==
Guyon was also a "minor league baseball star".

=== Player ===
Guyon had previously hit over .340 three consecutive years for the Louisville Colonels in the American Association, which at AA, was at the highest classification of the era. His playing career as an outfielder extended from 1920 through 1936 with a break during his college coaching career.

=== Coach ===
Guyon was the head coach of the Clemson Tigers baseball team at Clemson University from 1928 to 1931. He managed the Anderson Electrics in the Palmetto League in 1931, the Asheville Tourists in 1932, and the Fieldale Towlers in 1936.

== Head coaching record ==
=== Football ===
Year	Team	Overall	Conference	Standing	Bowl/playoffs
Union (Tennessee) Bulldogs (Independent) (1919)
1919	Union	2–5			
Union (Tennessee) Bulldogs (Independent) (1923–1924)
1923	Union	4–4–1			
1924	Union	3–6			
Union (Tennessee) Bulldogs (Southern Intercollegiate Athletic Association) (1925–1926)
1925	Union	5–4	1–1	T–11th	
1926	Union	3–6	1–4	22nd	
Union (Tennessee):		17–25–1	2–5		
Total:		17–25–1			
