= 1916 Southern Intercollegiate Athletic Association football season =

- League: NCAA
- Sport: College football
- Duration: September 23, 1916 through December 9, 1916
- Teams: 25

Regular Season
- Season champions: Georgia Tech; Tennessee

Football seasons
- ← 1915 1917 →

1916 Southern Intercollegiate Athletic Association football standings
	Conf.					Overall
Team	W		L		T	W		L		T
Georgia Tech +	5	–	0	–	0	8	–	0	–	1
Tennessee +	6	–	0	–	1	8	–	0	–	1
Vanderbilt	4	–	1	–	1	7	–	1	–	1
LSU	3	–	1	–	1	7	–	1	–	2
The Citadel	3	–	1	–	0	6	–	1	–	1
Tulane	2	–	1	–	1	4	–	3	–	1
Kentucky	2	–	1	–	2	4	–	1	–	2
Auburn	6	–	2	–	0	6	–	2	–	0
Georgia	5	–	2	–	0	6	–	3	–	0
Alabama	4	–	3	–	0	6	–	3	–	0
Sewanee	2	–	2	–	2	5	–	2	–	2
Centre	1	–	1	–	1	5	–	1	–	3
Howard (AL)	1	–	1	–	0	6	–	4	–	0
Georgetown (KY)	1	–	1	–	0	2	–	1	–	0
Mississippi A&M	3	–	4	–	0	4	–	4	–	1
Transylvania	2	–	3	–	1	3	–	3	–	2
Mississippi College	2	–	3	–	0	6	–	3	–	0
Clemson	2	–	4	–	0	3	–	6	–	0
South Carolina	2	–	4	–	0	2	–	7	–	0
Wofford	1	–	2	–	0	2	–	7	–	0
Louisville	1	–	2	–	1	2	–	3	–	1
Furman	1	–	3	–	0	4	–	5	–	0
Chattanooga	1	–	4	–	0	3	–	5	–	0
Florida	0	–	4	–	0	0	–	5	–	0
Mercer	0	–	5	–	0	1	–	6	–	0
Ole Miss	0	–	6	–	0	3	–	6	–	0
+ – Conference co-champions

The 1916 Southern Intercollegiate Athletic Association football season was the college football games played by the member schools of the Southern Intercollegiate Athletic Association as part of the 1916 college football season. The season began on September 23. Georgia Tech and Tennessee tied for the conference championship. Tech beat Cumberland 222–0.

== Regular season ==
Index to colors and formatting
Non-conference matchup; SIAA member won
Non-conference matchup; SIAA member lost
Non-conference matchup; tie
Conference matchup

SIAA teams in bold.

=== Week One ===
Date	Visiting team	Home team	Site	Result	Attendance	Reference
September 23	Kentucky School for the Deaf	**Kentucky**	Lexington, Kentucky	**W** 34–0		

=== Week Two ===
Date	Visiting team	Home team	Site	Result	Attendance	Reference
September 30	Birmingham	**Alabama**	University Field • Tuscaloosa, Alabama	**W** 13–0		
September 30	**Furman**	**Clemson**	Riggs Field • Calhoun, South Carolina	**CLEM** 7–6		
September 30	**The Citadel**	**Georgia**	Sanford Field • Athens, Georgia	**UGA** 6–0		
September 30	K. M. I.	**Centre**	Cheek Field • Danville, Kentucky	**W** 14–0		
September 30	**Mercer**	**Georgia Tech**	Grant Field • Atlanta	**GT** 61–0		
September 30	Butler	**Kentucky**	Lexington, Kentucky	**W** 39–0		
September 30	**LSU**	Louisiana-Lafayette	Lafayette, Louisiana	**W** 24–0		
September 30	Union (TN)	**Ole Miss**	Hemingway Stadium • Oxford, Mississippi	**W** 30–0		
September 30	Cumberland	**Sewanee**	McGee Field • Sewanee, Tennessee	**W** 107–0		
September 30	Tusculum	**Tennessee**	Waite Field • Knoxville, Tennessee	**W** 33–0		
September 30	Rhodes	**Vanderbilt**	Dudley Field • Nashville, Tennessee	**W** 86–0		

=== Week Three ===
Date	Visiting team	Home team	Site	Result	Attendance	Reference
October 6	**Mississippi A&M**	Mississippi College	Aberdeen, Mississippi	**MSCOLL** 13–6		
October 7	Alabama Southern	Alabama	The Quad • Tuscaloosa, Alabama	**W** 80–0		
October 7	**Auburn**	Howard	Rickwood Field • Birmingham, Alabama	**AUB** 35–0		
October 7	**Centre**	Kentucky	Lexington, Kentucky	**UK** 68–0		
October 7	Charleston Navy	The Citadel	College Park Stadium • Charleston, South Carolina	**W** 35–0		
October 7	Cumberland	Georgia Tech	Grant Field • Atlanta	**W** 222–0		
October 7	Jefferson	LSU	State Field • Baton Rouge, Louisiana	**W** 59–0		
October 7	Arkansas	Ole Miss	Hemingway Stadium • Oxford, Mississippi	**W** 20–0		
October 7	Morgan	Sewanee	McGee Field • Sewanee, Tennessee	**W** 54–0		
October 7	Maryville	Tennessee	Shields–Watkins Field • Knoxville, Tennessee	**W** 32–6		
October 7	**Transylvania**	Vanderbilt	Dudley Field • Nashville, Tennessee	**VAN** 42–0		
October 7	Newberry	South Carolina	Columbia, South Carolina	**L** 10-0		
October 7	Presbyterian	Wofford	Spartanburg, South Carolina	**L** 49–13		

=== Week Four ===
Date	Visiting team	Home team	Site	Result	Attendance	Reference
October 14	**Mississippi College**	**Alabama**	University Field • Birmingham, Alabama	**ALA** 13–7		
October 14	**Mercer**	**Auburn**	Drake Field • Auburn, Alabama	**AUB** 92–0		
October 14	Centre	**Louisville**	Louisville, Kentucky	**T** 0–0		
October 14	Presbyterian	**The Citadel**	College Park Stadium • Charleston, South Carolina	**W** 34–7		
October 14	Erskine	**Furman**	Greenville, South Carolina	**W** 60–3		
October 14	**Florida**	**Georgia**	Sanford Field • Athens, Georgia	**UGA** 21–0		
October 14	Davidson	**Georgia Tech**	Grant Field • Atlanta	**W** 9–0		
October 14	**LSU**	Texas A&M	Galveston, Texas	**W** 13–0		
October 14	Hendrix	**Ole Miss**	Hemingway Stadium • Oxford, Mississippi	**W** 61–0		
October 14	**Mississippi A&M**	**Chattanooga**	Chattanooga, Tennessee	**MSA&M** 33–0		
October 14	Maryville	**Sewanee**	McGee Field • Sewanee, Tennessee	**W** 68–7		
October 14	**Tennessee**	**Clemson**	Riggs Field • Calhoun, South Carolina	**TENN** 14–0		
October 14	Spring Hill	**Tulane**	First Tulane Stadium • New Orleans, Louisiana	**W** 14–0		
October 14	**Vanderbilt**	**Kentucky**	Stoll Field • Lexington, Kentucky	**VAN** 45–0		
October 14	**Wofford**	South Carolina	Columbia, South Carolina	**SC** 23–3		

=== Week Five ===
Date	Visiting team	Home team	Site	Result	Attendance	Reference
October 20	**Clemson**	**Auburn**	Drake Field • Auburn, Alabama	**AUB** 28–0		
October 21	**Alabama**	**Florida**	Barrs Field • Jacksonville, Florida	**ALA** 16–0		
October 21	**Chattanooga**	**Louisville**	Louisville, Kentucky	**LOU** 6–0		
October 21	**The Citadel**	Davidson	Davidson, North Carolina	**T** 7–7		
October 21	Georgia Tech B	**Furman**	Greenville, South Carolina	**W** 21–10		
October 21	**Georgia**	Virginia	Lambeth Field • Charlottesville, Virginia	**W** 13–7		
October 21	**Mississippi College**	**LSU**	State Field • Baton Rouge, Louisiana	**LSU** 50–7		
October 21	**Transylvania**	**Mississippi A&M**	Davis Wade Stadium • Starkville, Mississippi	**MSA&M** 13–0		
October 21	**Sewanee**	**Kentucky**	Lexington, Kentucky	**T** 0–0		
October 21	**South Carolina**	**Tennessee**	Waite Field • Knoxville, Tennessee	**TEN** 26–0		
October 21	Jefferson	**Tulane**	New Orleans, Louisiana	**W** 39–3		
October 21	**Ole Miss**	**Vanderbilt**	Dudley Field • Nashville, Tennessee	**VAN** 35–0		
October 21	Erskine	**Wofford**	Spartanburg, South Carolina	**L** 12–7		

=== Week Six ===
Date	Visiting team	Home team	Site	Result	Attendance	Reference
October 26	**Clemson**	**South Carolina**	Columbia, South Carolina	**CLEM** 27–0		
October 27	Kentucky Wesleyan	**Centre**	Cheek Field • Danville, Kentucky	**W** 111–0		
October 27	**Furman**	Presbyterian	Clinton, South Carolina	**W** 42–10		
October 27	**Tulane**	**Mississippi College**	Jackson, Mississippi	**TUL** 13–3		
October 28	**Ole Miss**	**Alabama**	University Field • Tuscaloosa, Alabama	**ALA** 27–0		
October 28	**Mississippi A&M**	**Auburn**	Rickwood Field • Birmingham, Alabama	**AUB** 7–3		
October 28	**The Citadel**	Newberry	Newberry, South Carolina	**W** 21–14		
October 28	**Georgia**	Navy	Annapolis, Maryland	**L** 27–3		
October 28	**Kentucky**	Cincinnati	Cincinnati	**W** 32–0		
October 28	**Sewanee**	**LSU**	New Orleans, Louisiana	**SEW** 7–0		
October 28	**Tennessee**	**Florida**	Tampa, Florida	**TENN** 24–0		
October 28	Butler	**Louisville**	Louisville, Kentucky	**W** 19-7		
October 28	Guilford	**Wofford**	Spartanburg, South Carolina	**W** 31-0		
October 28	Virginia	**Vanderbilt**	Dudley Field • Nashville, Tennessee	**W** 27–6		

=== Week Seven ===
Date	Visiting team	Home team	Site	Result	Attendance	Reference
November 3	**Ole Miss**	Mississippi A&M	Tupelo, Mississippi	**MSA&M** 36–0		
November 4	**Georgetown (KY)**	Louisville	Louisville, Kentucky	**G KY** 41-0		
November 4	**Sewanee**	Alabama	Rickwood Field • Birmingham, Alabama	**SEW** 7–6		
November 4	**Auburn**	Georgia	McClung Stadium • Columbus, Georgia	**AUB** 3–0		
November 4	**Wofford**	The Citadel	College Park Stadium • Charleston, South Carolina	**CIT** 37–0		
November 4	Davidson	Furman	Greenville, South Carolina	**L** 46–14		
November 4	Wake Forest	South Carolina	Columbia, South Carolina	**L** 33-7		
November 4	**Tulane**	Georgia Tech	Grant Field • Atlanta	**GT** 45–0		
November 4	**Tennessee**	Chattanooga	Chattanooga, Tennessee	**TENN** 12–7		
November 4	Rose-Hulman	Vanderbilt	Dudley Field • Nashville, Tennessee	**W** 67–0		
November 5	Arkansas	LSU	Fair Grounds Field • Shreveport, Louisiana	**W** 17–7		

=== Week Eight ===
Date	Visiting team	Home team	Site	Result	Attendance	Reference
November 7	**Mississippi College**	Southern Miss	Hattiesburg, Mississippi	**W** 75–0		
November 11	**Auburn**	**Florida**	Jacksonville, Florida	**AUB** 20–0		
November 11	**Furman**	**Georgia**	Sanford Field • Athens, Georgia	**UGA** 49–0		
November 11	**Georgia Tech**	**Alabama**	Rickwood Field • Birmingham, Alabama	**GT** 13–0		
November 11	**Centre**	Central	Richmond, Kentucky	**W** 26–0		
November 11	**LSU**	**Mississippi A&M**	Davis Wade Stadium • Starkville, Mississippi	**LSU** 13–3		
November 11	**Ole Miss**	**Transylvania**	Lexington, Kentucky	**TRANS** 13–3		
November 11	**Chattanooga**	**Sewanee**	McGee Field • Sewanee, Tennessee	**SEW** 54–0		
November 11	**Vanderbilt**	**Tennessee**	Waite Field • Knoxville, Tennessee	**TENN** 10–6		
November 11	**Tulane**	Rice	Houston	**L** 23–13		
November 11	Newberry	**Wofford**	Spartanburg, South Carolina	**L** 21–0		
November 11	**South Carolina**	Virginia	Charlottesville, Virginia	**L** 35-6		

=== Week Nine ===
Date	Visiting team	Home team	Site	Result	Attendance	Reference
November 16	**The Citadel**	**Clemson**	Orangeburg, South Carolina	**CIT** 3–0		
November 18	**Furman**	**North Carolina**	Chapel Hill, North Carolina	**L** 0-46		
November 18	**Alabama**	**Tulane**	New Orleans, Louisiana	**TUL** 33–0		
November 18	**Vanderbilt**	**Auburn**	Rickwood Field • Birmingham, Alabama	**VAN** 20–9		
November 18	**Georgia Tech**	**Georgia**	Sanford Field • Athens, Georgia	**GT** 21–0		
November 18	**Transylvania**	**Centre**	Danville, Kentucky	**T** 0–0		
November 18	**Florida**	Indiana	Jordan Field • Bloomington, Indiana	**L** 14–3		
November 18	**Mississippi A&M**	**Kentucky**	Stoll Field • Lexington, Kentucky	**UK** 13–3		
November 18	**Ole Miss**	**LSU**	State Field • Baton Rouge, Louisiana	**LSU** 41–0		
November 18	Franklin	**Louisville**	Louisville, Kentucky	**L** 16-12		
November 18	Ouachita	**Mississippi College**	Clinton, Mississippi	**W** 26–0		
November 18	**Mercer**	**South Carolina**	Columbia, South Carolina	**SC** 47–0		
November 18	**Sewanee**	**Tennessee**	Chattanooga, Tennessee	**TENN** 17–0		
November 18	**Wofford**	Wake Forest	Wake Forest, North Carolina	**L** 41–0		
November 20	Maryville	**Mississippi A&M**	Davis Wade Stadium • Starkville, Mississippi	**T** 7–7		
November 23	**South Carolina**	**Furman**	Sanford Field • Greenville, South Carolina	**FUR** 14-0		

=== Week Ten ===
Date	Visiting team	Home team	Site	Result	Attendance	Reference
November 30	**Furman**	**Wofford**	Spartanburg, South Carolina	**WOF** 9-7		
November 30	**The Citadel**	**South Carolina**	Columbia, South Carolina	**CIT** 20–2		
November 30	**Centre**	**Georgetown**	Georgetown, Kentucky	**CEN** 14–7		
November 30	**Clemson**	Davidson	Charlotte, North Carolina	**L** 33–0		
November 30	**Georgia**	**Alabama**	Rickwood Field • Birmingham, Alabama	**UGA** 3–0		
November 30	**Auburn**	**Georgia Tech**	Grant Field • Atlanta	**GT** 33–7		
November 30	**Furman**	**Wofford**	Spartanburg, South Carolina	**WOF** 9–7		
November 30	**Tennessee**	**Kentucky**	Stoll Field • Lexington, Kentucky	**T** 0–0		
November 30	**Transylvania**	**Louisville**	Louisville, Kentucky	**TRAN** 13-0		
November 30	Arkansas	**Mississippi A&M**	Memphis, Tennessee	**W** 20–7		
November 30	**LSU**	**Tulane**	New Orleans	**T** 14–14		
November 30	**Ole Miss**	**Mississippi College**	Jackson, Mississippi	**MSCOLL** 36–14		

=== Week Eleven ===
Date	Visiting team	Home team	Site	Result	Attendance	Reference
December 9	Georgetown	**Tulane**	New Orleans, Louisiana	**L** 61–0		

== Awards and honors ==
=== All-Americans ===
- E – Graham Vowell, Tennessee (WC-3)
- C – Pup Phillips, Georgia Tech (WC-3)
- QB – Irby Curry, Vanderbilt (WC-3)
- HB – Everett Strupper, Georgia Tech (PP-1 [e])

=== All-Southern team ===
The following includes the composite All-Southern team formed by the selection of 4 newspapers,

Position	Name	First-team selectors	Team
QB	Irby Curry	C, NTC	Vanderbilt
HB	Everett Strupper	C, NTC	Georgia Tech
HB	Doc Rodes	C, NTC	Kentucky
FB	Tommy Spence	C, NTC	Georgia Tech
E	Graham Vowell	C, NTC	Tennessee
T	Josh Cody	C, NTC	Vanderbilt
G	Bob Lang	C, NTC	Georgia Tech
C	Pup Phillips	C, NTC	Georgia Tech
G	Chink Lowe	C	Tennessee
T	Walker Carpenter	C, NTC	Georgia Tech

== See also ==
- 1916 Cumberland vs. Georgia Tech football game
