= 1916 Vanderbilt Commodores football team =

American college football season

1916 Vanderbilt Commodores football
- Conference: Southern Intercollegiate Athletic Association
- Record: 7–1–1 (4–1–1 SIAA)
- Head coach: Dan McGugin (13th season)
- Offensive scheme: Short punt
- Captain: Irby Curry
- Home stadium: Dudley Field

1916 Southern Intercollegiate Athletic Association football standings
	Conf.					Overall
Team	W		L		T	W		L		T
Georgia Tech +	5	–	0	–	0	8	–	0	–	1
Tennessee +	6	–	0	–	1	8	–	0	–	1
Vanderbilt	4	–	1	–	1	7	–	1	–	1
LSU	3	–	1	–	1	7	–	1	–	2
The Citadel	3	–	1	–	0	6	–	1	–	1
Tulane	2	–	1	–	1	4	–	3	–	1
Kentucky	2	–	1	–	2	4	–	1	–	2
Auburn	6	–	2	–	0	6	–	2	–	0
Georgia	5	–	2	–	0	6	–	3	–	0
Alabama	4	–	3	–	0	6	–	3	–	0
Sewanee	2	–	2	–	2	5	–	2	–	2
Centre	1	–	1	–	1	5	–	1	–	3
Howard (AL)	1	–	1	–	0	6	–	4	–	0
Georgetown (KY)	1	–	1	–	0	2	–	1	–	0
Mississippi A&M	3	–	4	–	0	4	–	4	–	1
Transylvania	2	–	3	–	1	3	–	3	–	2
Mississippi College	2	–	3	–	0	6	–	3	–	0
Clemson	2	–	4	–	0	3	–	6	–	0
South Carolina	2	–	4	–	0	2	–	7	–	0
Wofford	1	–	2	–	0	2	–	7	–	0
Louisville	1	–	2	–	1	2	–	3	–	1
Furman	1	–	3	–	0	4	–	5	–	0
Chattanooga	1	–	4	–	0	3	–	5	–	0
Florida	0	–	4	–	0	0	–	5	–	0
Mercer	0	–	5	–	0	1	–	6	–	0
Ole Miss	0	–	6	–	0	3	–	6	–	0
+ – Conference co-champions

The 1916 Vanderbilt Commodores football team represented Vanderbilt University in the 1916 Southern Intercollegiate Athletic Association football season. The 1916 season was Dan McGugin's 13th year as head coach. Quarterback Irby Curry was selected third-team All-America by Walter Camp.

== Schedule ==
Date	Opponent	Site	Result	Source
September 30	Southwestern Presbyterian*	Dudley Field; Nashville, TN	W 86–0	
October 7	Transylvania	Dudley Field; Nashville, TN	W 42–0	
October 14	at Kentucky	Stoll Field; Lexington, KY (rivalry)	W 45–0	
October 21	Ole Miss	Dudley Field; Nashville, TN (rivalry)	W 35–0	
October 28	Virginia*	Dudley Field; Nashville, TN	W 27–6	
November 4	Rose Poly*	Dudley Field; Nashville, TN	W 67–0	
November 11	at Tennessee	Waite Field; Knoxville, TN (rivalry)	L 6–10	
November 18	at Auburn	Rickwood Field; Birmingham, AL	W 20–9	
November 30	Sewanee	Dudley Field; Nashville, TN (rivalry)	T 0–0	
*Non-conference game

== Game summaries ==
=== Southwestern Presbyterian ===
The season opened against Southwestern Presbyterian with a 86–0 win.

=== Transylvania ===
In the second week of play, Transylvania was beaten, 42–0.

=== Kentucky ===
Vanderbilt defeated Kentucky, 45–0. Vanderbilt coach Dan McGugin stated "If you would give me Doc Rodes, I would say he was a greater player than Curry."

=== Ole Miss ===
Vanderbilt beat Ole Miss, 35–0.

=== Virginia ===
Vanderbilt beat Virginia, 27–6. Josh Cody made a 50-yard field goal.

=== Rose Poly ===
Vanderbilt beat Rose Poly, 67–0.

=== Tennessee ===
Tennessee upset Vanderbilt, 10–6. Vanderbilt's lone score came on a 70-yard run by Rabbit Curry. The year's only unanimous All-Southern Graham Vowell scored Tennessee's winning touchdown.

The starting lineup was Adams (left end), Cody (left tackle), Williams (left guard), Hamilton (center), Harman (right guard), Lipscomb (right tackle), Cohen (right end), Curry (quarterback), Floyd (left halfback), Zerfoss (right halfback), Ray (fullback).

=== Auburn ===
Vanderbilt at Auburn

Team	1	2	3	4	Total
• Vanderbilt	7	0	0	13	20
Auburn	0	6	3	0	9

- Date: November 18
- Location: Rickwood Field
  Birmingham, Alabama
- Referee: Bradley Walker

Vanderbilt eliminated Auburn from SIAA title contention by a 20–9 score. Josh Cody carried the ball over for the first touchdown. Rabbit Curry played well at the start, but could not play the entire game due to an ankle injury. Moon Ducote made a 45-yard field goal in the third quarter to put the Tigers up 9–7. With the help of the forward pass, the Commodores scored two further touchdowns in the last quarter.

The starting lineup was Zerfoss (left end), Cody (left tackle), Williams (left guard), Hamilton (center), Carman (right guard), Lipscomb (right tackle), Cohen (right end), Curry (quarterback), Richardson (left halfback), Beasley (right halfback), Ray (fullback).

=== Sewanee ===
Sewanee vs. Vanderbilt

Team	1	2	3	4	Total
Sewanee	0	0	0	0	0
Vanderbilt	0	0	0	0	0

Vanderbilt and rival Sewanee fought to a scoreless tie. Red Floyd fumbled in the shadow of the goalpost.
