= 1916 Auburn Tigers football team =

American college football season

1916 Auburn Tigers football
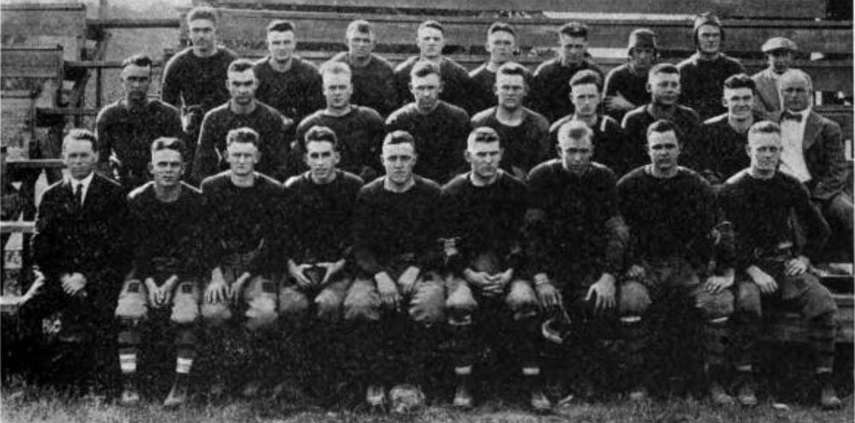
- Conference: Southern Intercollegiate Athletic Association
- Record: 6–2 (6–2 SIAA)
- Head coach: Mike Donahue (12th season)
- Base defense: 7–2–2
- Captain: Lucy Hairston
- Home stadium: Drake Field; Rickwood Field

1916 Southern Intercollegiate Athletic Association football standings
	Conf.					Overall
Team	W		L		T	W		L		T
Georgia Tech +	5	–	0	–	0	8	–	0	–	1
Tennessee +	6	–	0	–	1	8	–	0	–	1
Vanderbilt	4	–	1	–	1	7	–	1	–	1
LSU	3	–	1	–	1	7	–	1	–	2
The Citadel	3	–	1	–	0	6	–	1	–	1
Tulane	2	–	1	–	1	4	–	3	–	1
Kentucky	2	–	1	–	2	4	–	1	–	2
Auburn	6	–	2	–	0	6	–	2	–	0
Georgia	5	–	2	–	0	6	–	3	–	0
Alabama	4	–	3	–	0	6	–	3	–	0
Sewanee	2	–	2	–	2	5	–	2	–	2
Centre	1	–	1	–	1	5	–	1	–	3
Howard (AL)	1	–	1	–	0	6	–	4	–	0
Georgetown (KY)	1	–	1	–	0	2	–	1	–	0
Mississippi A&M	3	–	4	–	0	4	–	4	–	1
Transylvania	2	–	3	–	1	3	–	3	–	2
Mississippi College	2	–	3	–	0	6	–	3	–	0
Clemson	2	–	4	–	0	3	–	6	–	0
South Carolina	2	–	4	–	0	2	–	7	–	0
Wofford	1	–	2	–	0	2	–	7	–	0
Louisville	1	–	2	–	1	2	–	3	–	1
Furman	1	–	3	–	0	4	–	5	–	0
Chattanooga	1	–	4	–	0	3	–	5	–	0
Florida	0	–	4	–	0	0	–	5	–	0
Mercer	0	–	5	–	0	1	–	6	–	0
Ole Miss	0	–	6	–	0	3	–	6	–	0
+ – Conference co-champions

The 1916 Auburn Tigers football team represented Auburn University in the 1916 college football season. It was the Tigers' 25th overall season and they competed as a member of the Southern Intercollegiate Athletic Association (SIAA). The team was led by head coach Mike Donahue, in his 12th year, and played their home games at Drake Field in Auburn, Alabama. They finished with a record of six wins and two losses (6–2 overall, 6–2 in the SIAA).

== Schedule ==
Date	Opponent	Site	Result	Source
October 7	at Howard (AL)	Rickwood Field; Birmingham, AL	W 35–0	
October 14	Mercer	Drake Field; Auburn, AL	W 92–0	
October 20	Clemson	Drake Field; Auburn, AL (rivalry)	W 28–0	
October 28	Mississippi A&M	Rickwood Field; Birmingham, AL	W 7–3	
November 4	vs. Georgia	Lane's Field; Columbus, GA (rivalry)	W 3–0	
November 11	vs. Florida	Jacksonville, FL (rivalry)	W 20–0	
November 18	Vanderbilt	Rickwood Field; Birmingham, AL	L 9–20	
November 30	at Georgia Tech	Grant Field; Atlanta, GA (rivalry)	L 7–33	

== Game summaries ==
=== Georgia ===
In the 1916 game against Georgia, Moon Ducote kicked a 40-yard field goal from placement off of captain Lucy Hairston's football helmet in the fourth quarter and in the mud, which proved the only points in the 3–0 Auburn victory. The maneuver prompted a rule that stated the ball must be kicked directly off the ground. Parke H. Davis described it thus:

Ducote falls back to try for a goal from the field. Hairston removes his leather helmet and places it upon the ground. He creases the top of the helmet and sights it for the goal. Spectators curiously watch the proceedings. Suddenly, the ball is passed. Hairston receives it, places it on the helmet, which all suddenly see it is to serve as a mechanical tee. Ducote leaps forward, kicks the ball from the top of the helmet and drives it straight as an arrow for Georgia's crossbar, over which it sails evenly between the posts."

=== Florida ===
Auburn at Florida

Team	1	2	3	4	Total
• Auburn	6	7	0	7	20
Florida	0	0	0	0	0

- Date: November 11
- Location: Jacksonville, Florida
- Referee: John Counselman

The Tigers beat the winless Florida Gators 20–0. Auburn's fullback Scott was the star of the contest. The second touchdown was a 50-yard interception return by Godwin.

The starting lineup was Jones (left end), Bonner (left tackle), Fricke (left guard), Goodwin (center), Campbell (right guard), Steed (right tackle), Burns (right end), Hairston (quarterback), Ducote (left halfback), Pendergast (right halfback), Scott (fullback).

=== Vanderbilt ===
Vanderbilt at Auburn

Team	1	2	3	4	Total
• Vanderbilt	7	0	0	13	20
Auburn	0	6	3	0	9

- Date: November 18
- Location: Rickwood Field
  Birmingham, Alabama
- Referee: Bradley Walker

Dan McGugin's Vanderbilt Commodores eliminated Auburn from SIAA title contention by a 20–9 score. Josh Cody carried the ball over for the first touchdown. Rabbit Curry played well at the start, but could not play the entire game due to an ankle injury. Moon Ducote made a 45-yard field goal in the third quarter to put the Tigers up 9–7. With the help of the forward pass, the Commodores scored two further touchdowns in the last quarter.

The starting lineup was C. Jones (left end), Sample (left tackle), Frickie (left guard), Robinson (center), Campbell (right guard), Bonner (right tackle), Steed (right end), Hairston (quarterback), Ducote (left halfback), Prendergast (right halfback), Scott (fullback).

=== Georgia Tech ===
Auburn at Georgia Tech

Team	1	2	3	4	Total
Auburn	0	0	7	0	7
• Ga. Tech	0	20	13	0	33

- Date: November 30
- Location: Grant Field
  Atlanta
- Referee: Mike Thompson

John Heisman's Georgia Tech overwhelmed rival Auburn 33–7 to clinch a share of the SIAA title. Tech end Dunwoody scored a touchdown when he recovered a fumble and raced 20 yards. Center Pup Phillips also had a score, falling on a punt he blocked. Auburn's star was Moon Ducote.

The starting lineup was C. Jones (left end), Sample (left tackle), Frickey (left guard), Robinson (center), Campbell (right guard), Ducote (right tackle), Steed (right end), T. Jones (quarterback), Hairston (left halfback), Prendergast (right halfback), Scott (fullback).
