= 1916 Tennessee Volunteers football team =

American college football season

1916 Tennessee Volunteers football

SIAA co-champion
- Conference: Southern Intercollegiate Athletic Association
- Record: 8–0–1 (6–0–1 SIAA)
- Head coach: John R. Bender (1st season)
- Offensive scheme: Short punt
- Base defense: Multiple
- Captain: Graham Vowell
- Home stadium: Waite Field

1916 Southern Intercollegiate Athletic Association football standings
	Conf.					Overall
Team	W		L		T	W		L		T
Georgia Tech +	5	–	0	–	0	8	–	0	–	1
Tennessee +	6	–	0	–	1	8	–	0	–	1
Vanderbilt	4	–	1	–	1	7	–	1	–	1
LSU	3	–	1	–	1	7	–	1	–	2
The Citadel	3	–	1	–	0	6	–	1	–	1
Tulane	2	–	1	–	1	4	–	3	–	1
Kentucky	2	–	1	–	2	4	–	1	–	2
Auburn	6	–	2	–	0	6	–	2	–	0
Georgia	5	–	2	–	0	6	–	3	–	0
Alabama	4	–	3	–	0	6	–	3	–	0
Sewanee	2	–	2	–	2	5	–	2	–	2
Centre	1	–	1	–	1	5	–	1	–	3
Howard (AL)	1	–	1	–	0	6	–	4	–	0
Georgetown (KY)	1	–	1	–	0	2	–	1	–	0
Mississippi A&M	3	–	4	–	0	4	–	4	–	1
Transylvania	2	–	3	–	1	3	–	3	–	2
Mississippi College	2	–	3	–	0	6	–	3	–	0
Clemson	2	–	4	–	0	3	–	6	–	0
South Carolina	2	–	4	–	0	2	–	7	–	0
Wofford	1	–	2	–	0	2	–	7	–	0
Louisville	1	–	2	–	1	2	–	3	–	1
Furman	1	–	3	–	0	4	–	5	–	0
Chattanooga	1	–	4	–	0	3	–	5	–	0
Florida	0	–	4	–	0	0	–	5	–	0
Mercer	0	–	5	–	0	1	–	6	–	0
Ole Miss	0	–	6	–	0	3	–	6	–	0
+ – Conference co-champions

The 1916 Tennessee Volunteers football team represented the University of Tennessee in the 1916 Southern Intercollegiate Athletic Association football season. John R. Bender served his first season as head coach of the Volunteers. Because of World War I, Tennessee did not field another varsity squad until 1919.

The 1916 Vols won eight games and lost none. The only blemish on Tennessee's record was a scoreless draw with Kentucky in the last game; and the Vols won a share of the Southern Intercollegiate Athletic Association title for the second time in three years — sharing the title with Georgia Tech. This season also saw the first homecoming football game in Tennessee football history, hosting rival Vanderbilt, against which Tennessee achieved a then-rare victory..

The New York Herald ranked quarterback Buck Hatcher as the season's premier punter. Captain and end Graham Vowell was the season's only unanimous All-Southern selection, and was a third-team All-America selection by Walter Camp. Next to him on the line was his older brother, Morris Vowell. Next to him was Chink Lowe. At the other end was Lloyd Wolfe.

== Before the season ==
Coach Bender came to Tennessee from Kansas State, effectively switching jobs with former Volunteers head coach Zora Clevenger. Bender ran a short punt system. In 1916, football used a one-platoon system in which players played both offense, defense, and special teams. Quarterback Buck Hatcher was a triple-threat.

== Schedule ==
Date	Opponent	Site	Result	Attendance	Source
September 30	Tusculum*	Waite Field; Knoxville, TN	W 33–0		
October 7	Maryville (TN)*	Waite Field; Knoxville, TN	W 32–6		
October 14	at Clemson	Riggs Field; Calhoun, SC	W 14–0		
October 21	South Carolina	Waite Field; Knoxville, TN (rivalry)	W 26–0		
October 28	at Florida	Plant Field; Tampa, FL (rivalry)	W 24–0		
November 4	at Chattanooga	Chamberlain Field; Chattanooga, TN	W 12–7		
November 11	Vanderbilt^{†}	Waite Field; Knoxville, TN (rivalry)	W 10–6		
November 18	vs. Sewanee	Andrews Field; Chattanooga, TN	W 17–0	500	
November 30	Kentucky	Waite Field; Knoxville, TN (rivalry)	T 0–0		
*Non-conference game; ^{†}Homecoming

== Game summaries ==
=== Tusculum ===
The season opened with a 33–0 defeat of Tusculum.

=== Maryville ===
In the second week of play, Tennessee beat the Maryville Scots 32–0.

=== Clemson ===
Tennessee at Clemson

Team	1	2	3	4	Total
• Tennessee	0	0	0	14	14
Clemson	0	0	0	0	0

- Date: October 12
- Location: Riggs Field
  Clemson, SC
- Referee: Bocock

Tennessee beat Clemson 14–0, the game remaining 0–0 well into the fourth quarter. Eventually in the fourth, Tennessee drove to the 1-yard line and lost the ball on downs. After forcing Clemson to punt, Tennessee again found itself at the 1-yard line, and was penalized 5 yards. Clemson was also penalized 5 yards, and with the ball back at the 1-yard line the Volunteers scored the touchdown. The second touchdown came on an interception.

The starting lineup was G. Vowell (left end), M. Vowell (left tackle), Shoulders (left guard), Robinson (center), Lowe (right guard), Henderson (right tackle), Wolfe (right end), Luck (quarterback), Emery (left halfback), Shelby (right halfback), A. Hatcher (fullback).

=== South Carolina ===
The Volunteers defeated South Carolina 26–0.

=== Florida ===
Tennessee at Florida

Team	1	2	3	4	Total
• Tennessee	7	7	0	10	24
Florida	0	0	0	0	0

- Date: October 28
- Location: Plant Field
  Tampa, FL
- Referee: Coles (Clemson)

The Vols blanked the Florida Gators in Tampa 24–0 in the two rivals first-ever meeting. Hatcher's punts were the feature of the contest.

The starting lineup was G. Vowell (left end), M. Vowell (left tackle), Lowe (left guard), Robinson (center), Shoulders (right guard), Hambaugh (right tackle), Wolfe (right end), A. Hatcher (quarterback), Shelby (left halfback), Emory (right halfback), Luck (fullback).

=== Chattanooga ===
Tennessee beat Chattanooga 12–7, the most points scored on the Vols all season.

=== Vanderbilt ===
Tennessee upset the Vanderbilt Commodores 10–6. Vanderbilt's lone score came on a 70-yard run by Rabbit Curry. Graham Vowell scored the touchdown and Buck Hatcher kicked a field goal. Hatcher regularly outpunted Tom Zerfoss. Both ends, Vowell and Lloyd Wolfe, helped stop Curry.

The starting lineup was G. Vowell (left end), M. Vowell (left tackle), Lowe (left guard), Robinson (center), Henderson (right guard), Hambaugh (right tackle), Wolfe (right end), A. Hatcher (quarterback), Emory (left halfback), Twifford (right halfback), Ring (fullback).

=== Sewanee ===
The Volunteers beat the Sewanee Tigers 17–0. Morris Vowell had a 99-yard interception return.

=== Kentucky ===
Kentucky at Tennessee

Team	1	2	3	4	Total
Kentucky	0	0	0	0	0
Tennessee	0	0	0	0	0

- Date: November 30
- Location: Waite Field
  Knoxville, TN
- Referee: Henry (Kenyon)

The season closed with an upset tie by the Kentucky Wildcats, an account of which reads "Rodes and McIlvain, Kentucky's quarterback and fullback, played a magnificent game and had they received the proper support from their team, would have piled up a large score against Tennessee."

The starting lineup was G. Vowell (left end), M. Vowell (left tackle), Lowe (left guard), Robinson (center), Henderson (right guard), Hambaugh (right tackle), Wolfe (right end), A. Hatcher (quarterback), Emory (left halfback), J. Luck (right halfback), Ring (fullback).

== Postseason ==
The New York Herald ranked quarterback Buck Hatcher as the season's premier punter. Graham Vowell was the season's only unanimous All-Southern selection, and was a third-team All-America selection by Walter Camp.

== Personnel ==
=== Depth chart ===
Offense

LE
Graham Vowell

LT	LG	C	RG	RT
Morris Vowell	Chink Lowe	Charles W. Robinson	Possum Henderson	P. C. Hambaugh
			William Shoulders	

RE
Lloyd Wolfe

QB
Buck Hatcher

LHB	RHB
Bill Emory	James K. Luck
A. G. Shelby	Bill Emory

FB
Ned Ring
James K. Luck

-
