= 1916 Kentucky Wildcats football team =

American college football season

1916 Kentucky Wildcats football
- Conference: Southern Intercollegiate Athletic Association
- Record: 4–1–2 (2–1–2 SIAA)
- Head coach: John J. Tigert (2nd season)
- Captain: Maury Crutcher
- Home stadium: Stoll Field

1916 Southern Intercollegiate Athletic Association football standings
	Conf.					Overall
Team	W		L		T	W		L		T
Georgia Tech +	5	–	0	–	0	8	–	0	–	1
Tennessee +	6	–	0	–	1	8	–	0	–	1
Vanderbilt	4	–	1	–	1	7	–	1	–	1
LSU	3	–	1	–	1	7	–	1	–	2
The Citadel	3	–	1	–	0	6	–	1	–	1
Tulane	2	–	1	–	1	4	–	3	–	1
Kentucky	2	–	1	–	2	4	–	1	–	2
Auburn	6	–	2	–	0	6	–	2	–	0
Georgia	5	–	2	–	0	6	–	3	–	0
Alabama	4	–	3	–	0	6	–	3	–	0
Sewanee	2	–	2	–	2	5	–	2	–	2
Centre	1	–	1	–	1	5	–	1	–	3
Howard (AL)	1	–	1	–	0	6	–	4	–	0
Georgetown (KY)	1	–	1	–	0	2	–	1	–	0
Mississippi A&M	3	–	4	–	0	4	–	4	–	1
Transylvania	2	–	3	–	1	3	–	3	–	2
Mississippi College	2	–	3	–	0	6	–	3	–	0
Clemson	2	–	4	–	0	3	–	6	–	0
South Carolina	2	–	4	–	0	2	–	7	–	0
Wofford	1	–	2	–	0	2	–	7	–	0
Louisville	1	–	2	–	1	2	–	3	–	1
Furman	1	–	3	–	0	4	–	5	–	0
Chattanooga	1	–	4	–	0	3	–	5	–	0
Florida	0	–	4	–	0	0	–	5	–	0
Mercer	0	–	5	–	0	1	–	6	–	0
Ole Miss	0	–	6	–	0	3	–	6	–	0
+ – Conference co-champions

The 1916 Kentucky Wildcats football team represented the University of Kentucky as a member of the Southern Intercollegiate Athletic Association (SIAA) during the 1916 college football season. Led by John J. Tigert in his second and final season as head coach, the Wildcats compiled an overall record of 4–1–2 with a mark 2–1–2 in SIAA play.

Stoll Field was dedicated for the game with rival Vanderbilt, the season's only loss. Vanderbilt's quarterback was third-team All-American Irby Curry. Vanderbilt coach Dan McGugin stated "If you would give me Doc Rodes, I would say he was a greater player than Curry." The season closed with an upset tie of conference champion and rival Tennessee; an account of which reads "Rodes and McIlvain, Kentucky's quarterback and fullback, played a magnificent game and had they received the proper support from their team, would have piled up a large score against Tennessee."

== Schedule ==
Date	Opponent	Site	Result	Source
September 30	Butler*	Stoll Field; Lexington, KY	W 39–3	
October 7	Centre	Stoll Field; Lexington, KY (rivalry)	W 68–0	
October 14	Vanderbilt	Stoll Field; Lexington, KY (rivalry)	L 0–45	
October 21	Sewanee	Stoll Field; Lexington, KY	T 0–0	
October 28	at Cincinnati*	Carson Field; Cincinnati, OH	W 32–0	
November 18	Mississippi A&M	Stoll Field; Lexington, KY	W 13–3	
November 30	at Tennessee	Waite Field; Knoxville, TN (rivalry)	T 0–0	
*Non-conference game
