= 1916 The Citadel Bulldogs football team =

American college football season

1916 The Citadel Bulldogs football

State champion
- Conference: Southern Intercollegiate Athletic Association
- Record: 6–1–1 (3–1 SIAA)
- Head coach: Harry J. O'Brien (1st season)
- Captain: John Weeks
- Home stadium: College Park Stadium

1916 Southern Intercollegiate Athletic Association football standings
| | Conf. | | | | | Overall |
| Team | W | | L | | T | W | | L | | T |
|---|---|---|---|---|---|---|---|---|---|---|
| Georgia Tech + | 5 | – | 0 | – | 0 | 8 | – | 0 | – | 1 |
| Tennessee + | 6 | – | 0 | – | 1 | 8 | – | 0 | – | 1 |
| Vanderbilt | 4 | – | 1 | – | 1 | 7 | – | 1 | – | 1 |
| LSU | 3 | – | 1 | – | 1 | 7 | – | 1 | – | 2 |
| The Citadel | 3 | – | 1 | – | 0 | 6 | – | 1 | – | 1 |
| Tulane | 2 | – | 1 | – | 1 | 4 | – | 3 | – | 1 |
| Kentucky | 2 | – | 1 | – | 2 | 4 | – | 1 | – | 2 |
| Auburn | 6 | – | 2 | – | 0 | 6 | – | 2 | – | 0 |
| Georgia | 5 | – | 2 | – | 0 | 6 | – | 3 | – | 0 |
| Alabama | 4 | – | 3 | – | 0 | 6 | – | 3 | – | 0 |
| Sewanee | 2 | – | 2 | – | 2 | 5 | – | 2 | – | 2 |
| Centre | 1 | – | 1 | – | 1 | 5 | – | 1 | – | 3 |
| Howard (AL) | 1 | – | 1 | – | 0 | 6 | – | 4 | – | 0 |
| Georgetown (KY) | 1 | – | 1 | – | 0 | 2 | – | 1 | – | 0 |
| Mississippi A&M | 3 | – | 4 | – | 0 | 4 | – | 4 | – | 1 |
| Transylvania | 2 | – | 3 | – | 1 | 3 | – | 3 | – | 2 |
| Mississippi College | 2 | – | 3 | – | 0 | 6 | – | 3 | – | 0 |
| Clemson | 2 | – | 4 | – | 0 | 3 | – | 6 | – | 0 |
| South Carolina | 2 | – | 4 | – | 0 | 2 | – | 7 | – | 0 |
| Wofford | 1 | – | 2 | – | 0 | 2 | – | 7 | – | 0 |
| Louisville | 1 | – | 2 | – | 1 | 2 | – | 3 | – | 1 |
| Furman | 1 | – | 3 | – | 0 | 4 | – | 5 | – | 0 |
| Chattanooga | 1 | – | 4 | – | 0 | 3 | – | 5 | – | 0 |
| Florida | 0 | – | 4 | – | 0 | 0 | – | 5 | – | 0 |
| Mercer | 0 | – | 5 | – | 0 | 1 | – | 6 | – | 0 |
| Ole Miss | 0 | – | 6 | – | 0 | 3 | – | 6 | – | 0 |
+ – Conference co-champions

The 1916 The Citadel Bulldogs football team represented The Citadel in the 1916 Southern Intercollegiate Athletic Association football season. Led by first-year head coach Harry J. O'Brien, the Bulldogs compiled an overall record of 6–1–1 with a mark of 3–1 in SIAA play. The Citadel claims a "State Championship" for 1916 by virtue of its wins over Presbyterian, Newberry, Wofford, Clemson, and South Carolina. The Bulldogs played home games at College Park Stadium in Hampton Park.

== Schedule ==
| Date | Opponent | Site | Result | Source |
|---|---|---|---|---|
| September 30 | at Georgia | Sanford Field; Athens, GA | L 0–6 | |
| October 7 | Charleston Navy* | College Park Stadium; Charleston, SC | W 35–0 | |
| October 14 | Presbyterian* | College Park Stadium; Charleston, SC | W 34–7 | |
| October 21 | at Davidson* | Sprunt Athletic Field; Davidson, NC | T 7–7 | |
| October 28 | Newberry* | College Park Stadium; Charleston, SC | W 21–14 | |
| November 10 | Wofford | College Park Stadium; Charleston, SC (rivalry) | W 37–0 | |
| November 16 | vs. Clemson | County Fairgrounds; Orangeburg, SC | W 3–0 | |
| November 30 | at South Carolina | Davis Field; Columbia, SC | W 20–2 | |
*Non-conference game
