= 1916 South Carolina Gamecocks football team =

American college football season

1916 South Carolina Gamecocks football
- Conference: Southern Intercollegiate Athletic Association
- Record: 2–7 (2–4 SIAA)
- Head coach: W. Rice Warren (1st season)
- Captain: M. K. McMillan
- Home stadium: Davis Field

1916 Southern Intercollegiate Athletic Association football standings
	Conf.					Overall
Team	W		L		T	W		L		T
Georgia Tech +	5	–	0	–	0	8	–	0	–	1
Tennessee +	6	–	0	–	1	8	–	0	–	1
Vanderbilt	4	–	1	–	1	7	–	1	–	1
LSU	3	–	1	–	1	7	–	1	–	2
The Citadel	3	–	1	–	0	6	–	1	–	1
Tulane	2	–	1	–	1	4	–	3	–	1
Kentucky	2	–	1	–	2	4	–	1	–	2
Auburn	6	–	2	–	0	6	–	2	–	0
Georgia	5	–	2	–	0	6	–	3	–	0
Alabama	4	–	3	–	0	6	–	3	–	0
Sewanee	2	–	2	–	2	5	–	2	–	2
Centre	1	–	1	–	1	5	–	1	–	3
Howard (AL)	1	–	1	–	0	6	–	4	–	0
Georgetown (KY)	1	–	1	–	0	2	–	1	–	0
Mississippi A&M	3	–	4	–	0	4	–	4	–	1
Transylvania	2	–	3	–	1	3	–	3	–	2
Mississippi College	2	–	3	–	0	6	–	3	–	0
Clemson	2	–	4	–	0	3	–	6	–	0
South Carolina	2	–	4	–	0	2	–	7	–	0
Wofford	1	–	2	–	0	2	–	7	–	0
Louisville	1	–	2	–	1	2	–	3	–	1
Furman	1	–	3	–	0	4	–	5	–	0
Chattanooga	1	–	4	–	0	3	–	5	–	0
Florida	0	–	4	–	0	0	–	5	–	0
Mercer	0	–	5	–	0	1	–	6	–	0
Ole Miss	0	–	6	–	0	3	–	6	–	0
+ – Conference co-champions

The 1916 South Carolina Gamecocks football team represented the University of South Carolina during the 1916 Southern Intercollegiate Athletic Association football season. Led by W. Rice Warren in his first and only season as head coach, the Gamecocks compiled an overall record of 2–7 with a mark of 2–4 in SIAA play.

== Schedule ==
Date	Time	Opponent	Site	Result	Source
October 7		Newberry*	Davis Field; Columbia, SC	L 0–10	
October 14		Wofford	Davis Field; Columbia, SC	W 23–3	
October 21		at Tennessee	Waite Field; Knoxville, TN (rivalry)	L 0–26	
October 26		Clemson	State Fairgrounds; Columbia, SC (Palmetto Bowl)	L 0–27	
November 4		Wake Forest*	Davis Field; Columbia, SC	L 7–33	
November 11		at Virginia*	Lambeth Field; Charlottesville, VA	L 6–35	
November 18		Mercer	Davis Field; Columbia, SC	W 47–0	
November 23	3:00 p.m.	at Furman	Greenville, SC	L 0–14	
November 30		The Citadel	Davis Field; Columbia, SC	L 2–20	
*Non-conference game; All times are in Eastern time
