= 1916 Florida Gators football team =

American college football season

1916 Florida Gators football
- Conference: Southern Intercollegiate Athletic Association
- Record: 0–5 (0–4 SIAA)
- Head coach: C. J. McCoy (3rd season)
- Captain: Rex Farrior
- Home stadium: Fleming Field

1916 Southern Intercollegiate Athletic Association football standings
| | Conf. | | | | | Overall |
| Team | W | | L | | T | W | | L | | T |
|---|---|---|---|---|---|---|---|---|---|---|
| Georgia Tech + | 5 | – | 0 | – | 0 | 8 | – | 0 | – | 1 |
| Tennessee + | 6 | – | 0 | – | 1 | 8 | – | 0 | – | 1 |
| Vanderbilt | 4 | – | 1 | – | 1 | 7 | – | 1 | – | 1 |
| LSU | 3 | – | 1 | – | 1 | 7 | – | 1 | – | 2 |
| The Citadel | 3 | – | 1 | – | 0 | 6 | – | 1 | – | 1 |
| Tulane | 2 | – | 1 | – | 1 | 4 | – | 3 | – | 1 |
| Kentucky | 2 | – | 1 | – | 2 | 4 | – | 1 | – | 2 |
| Auburn | 6 | – | 2 | – | 0 | 6 | – | 2 | – | 0 |
| Georgia | 5 | – | 2 | – | 0 | 6 | – | 3 | – | 0 |
| Alabama | 4 | – | 3 | – | 0 | 6 | – | 3 | – | 0 |
| Sewanee | 2 | – | 2 | – | 2 | 5 | – | 2 | – | 2 |
| Centre | 1 | – | 1 | – | 1 | 5 | – | 1 | – | 3 |
| Howard (AL) | 1 | – | 1 | – | 0 | 6 | – | 4 | – | 0 |
| Georgetown (KY) | 1 | – | 1 | – | 0 | 2 | – | 1 | – | 0 |
| Mississippi A&M | 3 | – | 4 | – | 0 | 4 | – | 4 | – | 1 |
| Transylvania | 2 | – | 3 | – | 1 | 3 | – | 3 | – | 2 |
| Mississippi College | 2 | – | 3 | – | 0 | 6 | – | 3 | – | 0 |
| Clemson | 2 | – | 4 | – | 0 | 3 | – | 6 | – | 0 |
| South Carolina | 2 | – | 4 | – | 0 | 2 | – | 7 | – | 0 |
| Wofford | 1 | – | 2 | – | 0 | 2 | – | 7 | – | 0 |
| Louisville | 1 | – | 2 | – | 1 | 2 | – | 3 | – | 1 |
| Furman | 1 | – | 3 | – | 0 | 4 | – | 5 | – | 0 |
| Chattanooga | 1 | – | 4 | – | 0 | 3 | – | 5 | – | 0 |
| Florida | 0 | – | 4 | – | 0 | 0 | – | 5 | – | 0 |
| Mercer | 0 | – | 5 | – | 0 | 1 | – | 6 | – | 0 |
| Ole Miss | 0 | – | 6 | – | 0 | 3 | – | 6 | – | 0 |
+ – Conference co-champions

The 1916 Florida Gators football team represented the University of Florida in the sport of American football during the 1916 college football season. The season was C. J. McCoy's third and last as the head coach of the Florida Gators football team.

While the Gators had never had a losing campaign in the program's ten seasons to date, key injuries, a lack of depth, and a challenging slate of opponents saw McCoy's squad post a 0–5 record (0–4 in the Southern Intercollegiate Athletic Association) while scoring a total of three points, leading to the head coach's dismissal. The disappointing season was notable for Florida's first meetings with future Southeastern Conference rivals Tennessee and Alabama.

== Before the season ==
Florida had posted a 9–5 record over the previous two seasons under Coach McCoy. Believing that he had the makings of a great squad, he abandoned Florida's usual practice of playing against mostly in-state opponents mixed with a few out-of-state foes and instead assembled the most challenging schedule the program had ever faced. The slate included several established football programs, including future conference rivals Georgia, Alabama, Tennessee, and Auburn along with a cross-sectional game at Indiana, with only one of those difficult contests to be played at Florida's on-campus home of Fleming Field.

== Season recap ==
McCoy's grand ambitions were stymied when his team's lack of quality depth was exposed by a series of key injuries and other defections, starting when triple threat quarterback Rammy Ramsdell broke his leg playing for Florida's baseball team and missed the entire football season. The squad lost two starting linemen before the opening game when Ham Dowling transferred and Everett Yon was called to serve in the National Guard, and nagging injuries saw several other key players miss playing time as the season progressed, with team captain and starting center Rex Farrior forced to move to fullback because of a lack of options in the offensive backfield. (Note: Rex Farrior became a name partner in a prominent Tampa law firm with 1910 quarterback Bob Shackleford, and remained one of the biggest boosters of the Gators sports program until his death.) Adding to the season's woes, what was potentially the best chance for a Florida win was dashed when Mercer administrators declared that several of their players were "behind in their studies" and cancelled their trip to Gainesville one week before the scheduled game.

Between the difficult schedule and the lack of available talent, the 1916 Gators set a remarkable program record for offensive futility by failing to score a single touchdown over the course of the season. His players insisted that McCoy should not be blamed for the winless campaign, but he was not retained as Florida's head football coach.

== Schedule ==
| Date | Opponent | Site | Result | Attendance | Source |
|---|---|---|---|---|---|
| October 14 | at Georgia | Sanford Field; Athens, GA (rivalry) | L 0–21 | | |
| October 21 | vs. Alabama | Fleming Field; Gainesville, FL (rivalry) | L 0–16 | | |
| October 28 | vs. Tennessee | Plant Field; Tampa, FL (rivalry) | L 0–24 | | |
| November 5 | vs. Mercer | Fleming Field; Gainesville, FL | cancelled | n/a | |
| November 11 | vs. Auburn | Barrs Field; Jacksonville, FL (rivalry) | L 0–20 | | |
| November 18 | at Indiana* | Jordan Field; Bloomington, IN | L 3–14 | 5,000 | |
*Non-conference game

== Game summaries ==
=== Georgia ===
Florida at Georgia

| Team | 1 | 2 | 3 | 4 | Total |
|---|---|---|---|---|---|
| Florida | 0 | 0 | 0 | 0 | 0 |
| • Georgia | 0 | 0 | 7 | 14 | 21 |

- Date: October 14
- Location: Sanford Field
  Athens, GA
- Referee: Streit

The season opened with a 21–0 loss to Georgia in Athens. The contest was scoreless in the first half. Georgia had to send in two stars who were resting with dislocated shoulders. Walter Neville scored the game's first touchdown.

The starting lineup was F. Henderson (left end), Baker (left tackle), Duvan (left guard), Robles (center), Golsby (right guard), Perry (right tackle), Wilkinson (right end), Fuller (quarterback), Wilson (left halfback), Hatcher (right halfback), Farrier (fullback).

=== Alabama ===
Alabama at Florida

| Team | 1 | 2 | 3 | 4 | Total |
|---|---|---|---|---|---|
| • Alabama | 0 | 7 | 0 | 9 | 16 |
| Florida | 0 | 0 | 0 | 0 | 0 |

- Date: October 21
- Location: Fleming Field
  Gainesville, FL
- Referee: Street

Florida's defense kept the game close into the final period but finally wore down, leading to a 16–0 loss to the Alabama Crimson Tide in the first ever meeting between the programs. Alabama quarterback Cecil Creen was the star of the game, scoring the Tide's two offensive touchdowns and making key defensive stops of Gator players "with a clear field ahead". Postgame accounts commented on Florida's "rather crude attempts at offensive play" in the loss, which was the program's first setback at five year old Fleming Field. It would also be the only game of the season to be played in Gainesville.

=== Tennessee ===
Tennessee at Florida

| Team | 1 | 2 | 3 | 4 | Total |
|---|---|---|---|---|---|
| • Tennessee | 7 | 7 | 0 | 10 | 24 |
| Florida | 0 | 0 | 0 | 0 | 0 |

- Date: October 28
- Location: Plant Field
  Tampa, FL
- Referee: Stricker Coles

The SIAA champion Tennessee Volunteers blanked the Gators in Tampa 24 to 0 in the two rivals first-ever meeting. Buck Hatcher's punts were the feature of the contest.

The starting lineup was F. Henderson (left end), Baker (left tackle), Perry (left guard), Robles (center), O. DeVane (right guard), Goldsby (right tackle), Wood (right end), Fuller (quarterback), Sparkman (left halfback), Wilson (right halfback), Farrier (fullback).

=== Auburn ===
Auburn at Florida

| Team | 1 | 2 | 3 | 4 | Total |
|---|---|---|---|---|---|
| • Auburn | 6 | 7 | 0 | 7 | 20 |
| Florida | 0 | 0 | 0 | 0 | 0 |

- Date: November 11
- Location: Barrs Field
  Jacksonville, FL
- Referee: John Counselman

The Auburn Plainsmen beat the Gators 20–0. Auburn's fullback Scott was the star of the contest. The second touchdown was a 50-yard interception return by Godwin.

The starting lineup was F. Henderson (left end), Bankston (left tackle), Rosenthal (left guard), Robles (center), Stockton (right guard), Goldsby (right tackle), Wood (right end), Fuller (quarterback), Sparkman (left halfback), Hatcher (right halfback), Farrier (fullback).

=== At Indiana ===
Florida at Indiana

| Team | 1 | 2 | 3 | 4 | Total |
|---|---|---|---|---|---|
| Florida | 0 | 3 | 0 | 0 | 3 |
| • Indiana | 0 | 0 | 7 | 7 | 14 |

- Date: November 18
- Location: Jordan Field
  Bloomington, IN
- Game attendance: 5,000
- Referee: Hamm (Kenyon)

The Gators closed out their 1916 schedule with a trip to Bloomington for what was their first (and only, as of 2025) gridiron contest with the Indiana Hoosiers. Florida scored its first points of the season with a second quarter field goal by freshman Paul Baker and held a 3–0 halftime lead. However, an on-field altercation early in the third period resulted in the ejection of Gator lineman Orryl Robles, and the team's lack of depth once again became a factor. The Hoosiers scored two unanswered second half touchdowns to take a 14–3 lead, and Florida capped off the ignominious campaign by seeing captain Rex Farrior break his leg in the final two minutes of the contest.

The starting lineup was F. Henderson (left end), Baker (left tackle), Rosenthal (left guard), Robles (center), Stockton (right guard), Goldsby (right tackle), Wood (right end), Fuller (quarterback), Sparkman (left halfback), Hatcher (right halfback), Farrier (fullback).

== Postseason ==
Though several players and the school yearbook expressed support for McCoy's program building skills, he was not retained as Florida's head football coach. He finished his three-year tenure at the school with an overall record of 9–10.

== Personnel ==
=== Line ===
| Player | Position | Games started | High school | Height | Weight | Age |
|---|---|---|---|---|---|---|
| Bake Baker | Tackle | 4 | | 6'2" | 205 | 22 |
| Paul Collins | Line | | | 5'10" | 185 | 24 |
| Fats DeVane | Guard, center | 2 | | 6'0" | 205 | 23 |
| Jack Goldsby | Tackle | 4 | | 5'9" | 185 | 23 |
| W. B. Henderson | End | 4 | | 5'9" | 155 | 23 |
| Tootie Perry | Guard | 2 | | 5'8" | 235 | 21 |
| Liza Robles | Center | 4 | | 5'11" | 180 | 23 |
| Jew Rosenthal | Tackle | 2 | | 5'10" | 176 | 21 |
| Stock Stockton | Guard | 2 | | 5'9" | 160 | 23 |
| Tuck Tucker | End | | | 6'1" | 158 | 19 |
| Rowdy Bill Wilkinson | End | 1 | | 5'8" | 145 | 24 |
| G. P. Wood | End | 3 | | 6'1" | 170 | 21 |

=== Backfield ===
| Player | Position | Games started | High school | Height | Weight | Age |
|---|---|---|---|---|---|---|
| Bush Bushnell | Halfback | | | 5'8" | 150 | 21 |
| Rex Farrior | Fullback | 4 | Hillsborough | 5'8" | 170 | 20 |
| Artie Fuller | Quarterback | 4 | | 5'11" | 158 | 21 |
| Fritz Hatcher | Halfback | 3 | | 5'8" | 155 | 22 |
| Raymond Rood | Halfback | | | 6'0" | 155 | 20 |
| Jim Sparkman | Halfback | 3 | | 5'8" | 167 | 22 |
| Leo Wilson | Halfback | 2 | | 5'9" | 155 | 20 |

=== Coaching staff ===
- Head coach: Charles J. McCoy
- Manager: W. D. Payne

== Bibliography ==
- McEwen, Tom (1974). The Gators: A Story of Florida Football. Huntsville, Alabama: The Strode Publishers. ISBN 0-87397-025-X.
- University of Florida (1917). The Seminole. Vol. 8.
