= 1916 Furman Baptists football team =

American college football season

1916 Furman Baptists football
- Conference: Southern Intercollegiate Athletic Association
- Record: 4–5 (1–3 SIAA)
- Head coach: Billy Laval (2nd season)
- Captain: William N. Gressette
- Home stadium: Augusta Street Park

1916 Southern Intercollegiate Athletic Association football standings
	Conf.					Overall
Team	W		L		T	W		L		T
Georgia Tech +	5	–	0	–	0	8	–	0	–	1
Tennessee +	6	–	0	–	1	8	–	0	–	1
Vanderbilt	4	–	1	–	1	7	–	1	–	1
LSU	3	–	1	–	1	7	–	1	–	2
The Citadel	3	–	1	–	0	6	–	1	–	1
Tulane	2	–	1	–	1	4	–	3	–	1
Kentucky	2	–	1	–	2	4	–	1	–	2
Auburn	6	–	2	–	0	6	–	2	–	0
Georgia	5	–	2	–	0	6	–	3	–	0
Alabama	4	–	3	–	0	6	–	3	–	0
Sewanee	2	–	2	–	2	5	–	2	–	2
Centre	1	–	1	–	1	5	–	1	–	3
Howard (AL)	1	–	1	–	0	6	–	4	–	0
Georgetown (KY)	1	–	1	–	0	2	–	1	–	0
Mississippi A&M	3	–	4	–	0	4	–	4	–	1
Transylvania	2	–	3	–	1	3	–	3	–	2
Mississippi College	2	–	3	–	0	6	–	3	–	0
Clemson	2	–	4	–	0	3	–	6	–	0
South Carolina	2	–	4	–	0	2	–	7	–	0
Wofford	1	–	2	–	0	2	–	7	–	0
Louisville	1	–	2	–	1	2	–	3	–	1
Furman	1	–	3	–	0	4	–	5	–	0
Chattanooga	1	–	4	–	0	3	–	5	–	0
Florida	0	–	4	–	0	0	–	5	–	0
Mercer	0	–	5	–	0	1	–	6	–	0
Ole Miss	0	–	6	–	0	3	–	6	–	0
+ – Conference co-champions

The 1916 Furman Baptists football team represented Furman University during the 1916 Southern Intercollegiate Athletic Association football season. Led by second-year head coach Billy Laval, Furman compiled an overall record of 4–5 with a mark of 1–3 in SIAA play.

== Schedule ==
Date	Time	Opponent	Site	Result	Attendance	Source
September 30		at Clemson	Riggs Field; Calhoun, SC	L 6–7		
October 14	3:30 p.m.	Erskine*	Greenville, SC	W 60–3		
October 21	3:30 p.m.	Georgia Tech freshmen*	Greenville, SC	W 21–0		
October 27		at Presbyterian*	Clinton, SC	W 42–10		
November 4	3:30 p.m.	Davidson*	Augusta Street Park; Greenville, SC	L 14–46	900	
November 11		at Georgia	Sanford Field; Athens, GA	L 0–49		
November 18	3:00 p.m.	at North Carolina*	Emerson Field; Chapel Hill, NC	L 0–46		
November 23	3:00 p.m.	South Carolina	Greenville, SC	W 14–0		
November 30		at Wofford	Spartanburg, SC (rivalry)	L 7–9		
*Non-conference game; All times are in Eastern time
