= 1916 Tulane Olive and Blue football team =

American college football season

1916 Tulane Olive and Blue football
- Conference: Southern Intercollegiate Athletic Association
- Record: 4–3–1 (2–1–1 SIAA)
- Head coach: Clark Shaughnessy (2nd season)
- Offensive scheme: Single-wing
- Captain: Victor Rosenthal
- Home stadium: First Tulane Stadium

1916 Southern Intercollegiate Athletic Association football standings
	Conf.					Overall
Team	W		L		T	W		L		T
Georgia Tech +	5	–	0	–	0	8	–	0	–	1
Tennessee +	6	–	0	–	1	8	–	0	–	1
Vanderbilt	4	–	1	–	1	7	–	1	–	1
LSU	3	–	1	–	1	7	–	1	–	2
The Citadel	3	–	1	–	0	6	–	1	–	1
Tulane	2	–	1	–	1	4	–	3	–	1
Kentucky	2	–	1	–	2	4	–	1	–	2
Auburn	6	–	2	–	0	6	–	2	–	0
Georgia	5	–	2	–	0	6	–	3	–	0
Alabama	4	–	3	–	0	6	–	3	–	0
Sewanee	2	–	2	–	2	5	–	2	–	2
Centre	1	–	1	–	1	5	–	1	–	3
Howard (AL)	1	–	1	–	0	6	–	4	–	0
Georgetown (KY)	1	–	1	–	0	2	–	1	–	0
Mississippi A&M	3	–	4	–	0	4	–	4	–	1
Transylvania	2	–	3	–	1	3	–	3	–	2
Mississippi College	2	–	3	–	0	6	–	3	–	0
Clemson	2	–	4	–	0	3	–	6	–	0
South Carolina	2	–	4	–	0	2	–	7	–	0
Wofford	1	–	2	–	0	2	–	7	–	0
Louisville	1	–	2	–	1	2	–	3	–	1
Furman	1	–	3	–	0	4	–	5	–	0
Chattanooga	1	–	4	–	0	3	–	5	–	0
Florida	0	–	4	–	0	0	–	5	–	0
Mercer	0	–	5	–	0	1	–	6	–	0
Ole Miss	0	–	6	–	0	3	–	6	–	0
+ – Conference co-champions

The 1916 Tulane Olive and Blue football team was an American football team that represented Tulane University as a member of the Southern Intercollegiate Athletic Association (SIAA) during the 1916 college football season. In its second year under head coach Clark Shaughnessy, Tulane compiled a 4–3–1 record (2–1–1 in conference games), finished sixth in the SIAA, and was outscored by a total of 149 to 126. The Georgetown game was a postseason game.

== Schedule ==
Date	Opponent	Site	Result	Source
October 14	Spring Hill*	Tulane Stadium; New Orleans, LA	W 14–0	
October 21	Jefferson College (LA)*	Tulane Stadium; New Orleans, LA	W 39–3	
October 27	at Mississippi College	State Fairgrounds; Jackson, MS	W 13–3	
November 4	at Georgia Tech	Grant Field; Atlanta, GA	L 0–45	
November 11	at Rice*	Rice Field; Houston, TX	L 13–23	
November 18	Alabama	New Orleans Fair Grounds; New Orleans, LA	W 33–0	
November 30	LSU	Tulane Stadium; New Orleans, LA (Battle for the Rag)	T 14–14	
December 9	Georgetown*	Heinemann Park; New Orleans, LA	L 0–61	
*Non-conference game

== Players ==
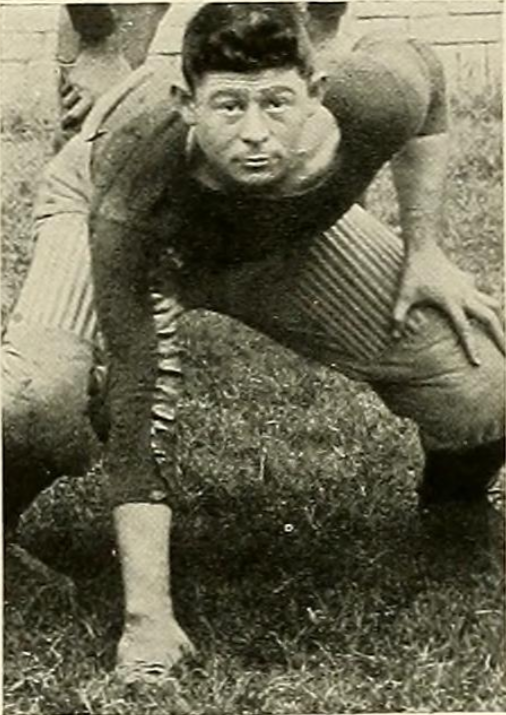
Rosy Rosenthal

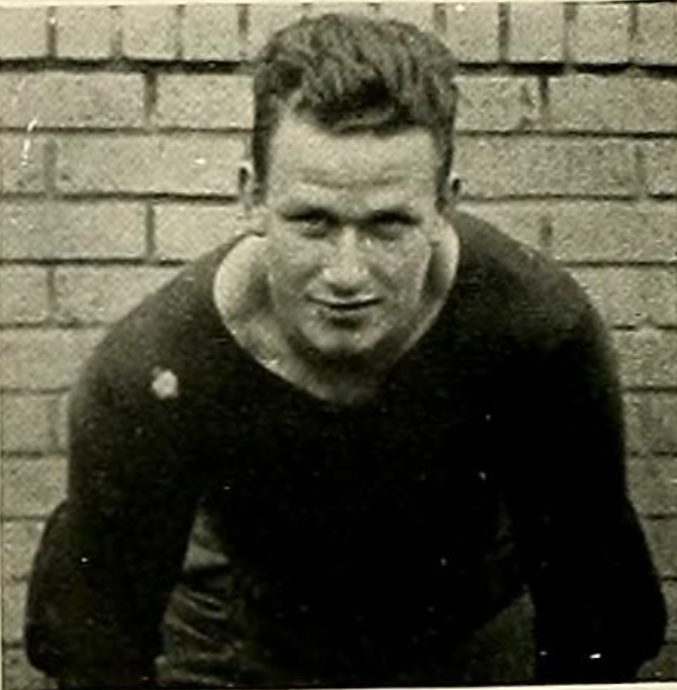
Mack McGraw

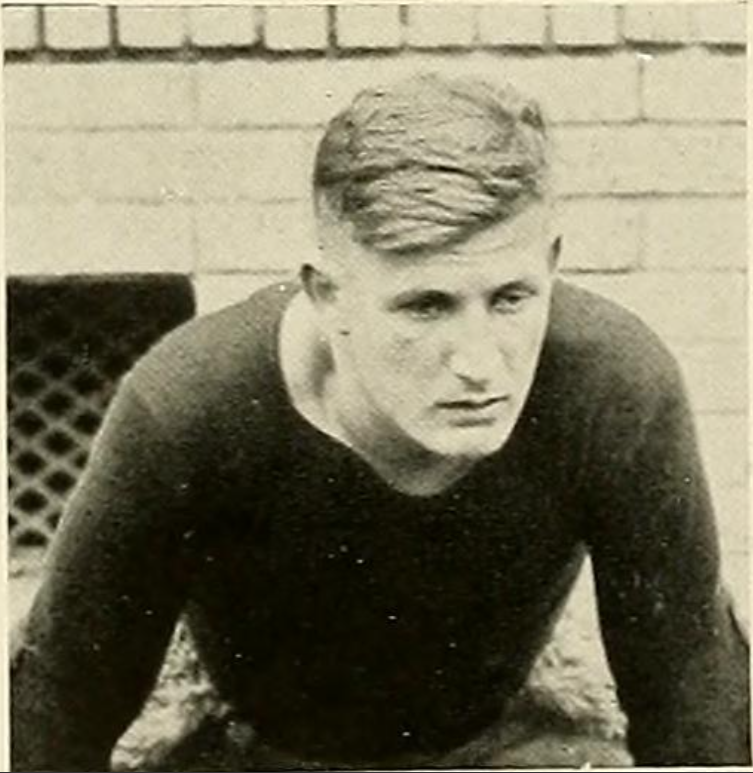
Ed Faust

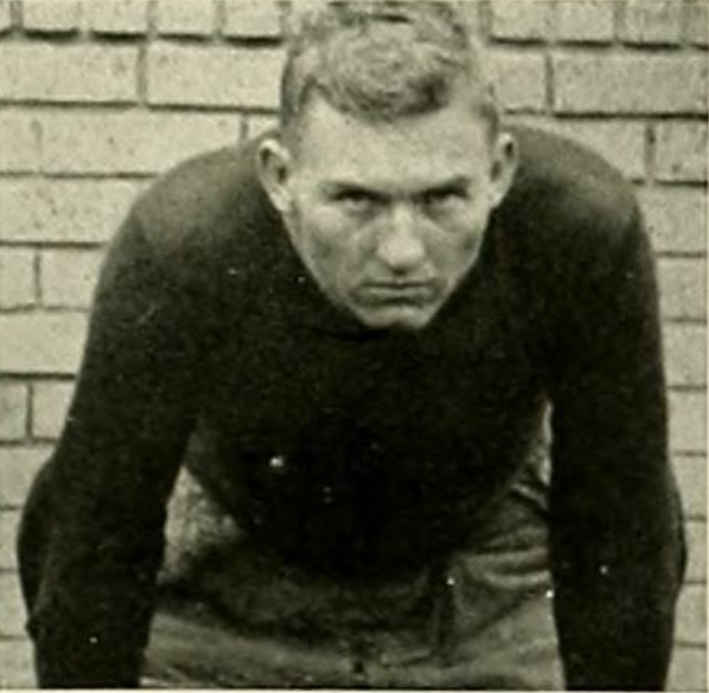
Edgar Galloway

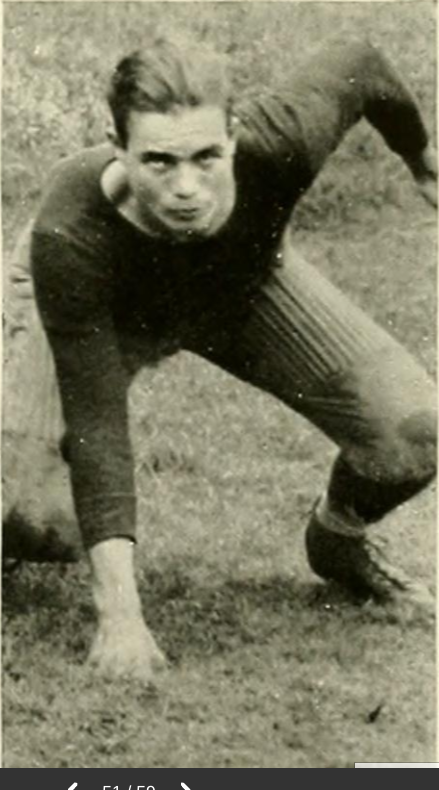
Benny Smith

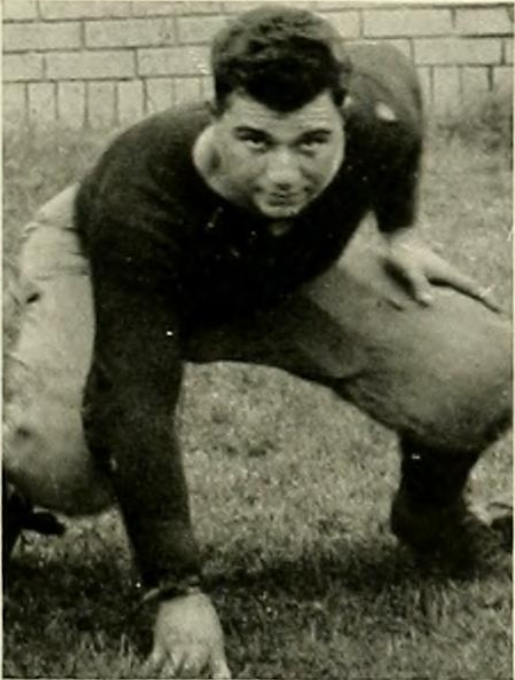
"Meester Joe" Meraux

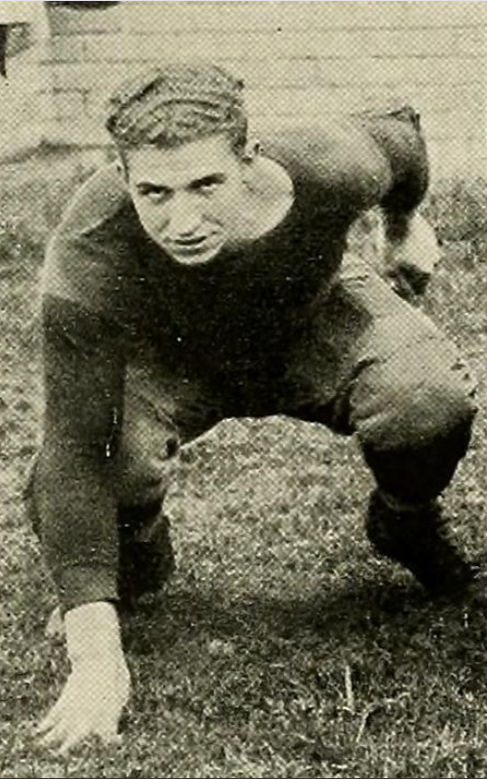
Otto Colee

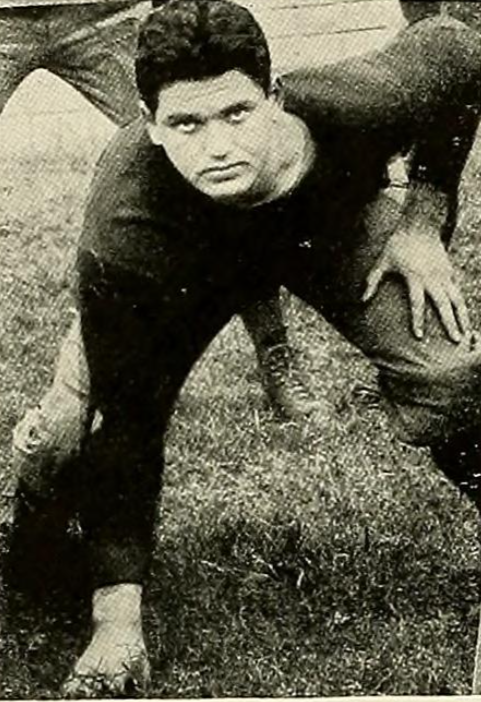
Hank Cardozo
