= 1916 Howard Baptists football team =

American college football season

1916 Howard Baptists football
- Conference: Southern Intercollegiate Athletic Association
- Record: 6–4 (1–1 SIAA)
- Head coach: John B. Longwell (3rd season)
- Home stadium: Howard Athletic Field; Rickwood Field

1916 Southern Intercollegiate Athletic Association football standings
	Conf.					Overall
Team	W		L		T	W		L		T
Georgia Tech +	5	–	0	–	0	8	–	0	–	1
Tennessee +	6	–	0	–	1	8	–	0	–	1
Vanderbilt	4	–	1	–	1	7	–	1	–	1
LSU	3	–	1	–	1	7	–	1	–	2
The Citadel	3	–	1	–	0	6	–	1	–	1
Tulane	2	–	1	–	1	4	–	3	–	1
Kentucky	2	–	1	–	2	4	–	1	–	2
Auburn	6	–	2	–	0	6	–	2	–	0
Georgia	5	–	2	–	0	6	–	3	–	0
Alabama	4	–	3	–	0	6	–	3	–	0
Sewanee	2	–	2	–	2	5	–	2	–	2
Centre	1	–	1	–	1	5	–	1	–	3
Howard (AL)	1	–	1	–	0	6	–	4	–	0
Georgetown (KY)	1	–	1	–	0	2	–	1	–	0
Mississippi A&M	3	–	4	–	0	4	–	4	–	1
Transylvania	2	–	3	–	1	3	–	3	–	2
Mississippi College	2	–	3	–	0	6	–	3	–	0
Clemson	2	–	4	–	0	3	–	6	–	0
South Carolina	2	–	4	–	0	2	–	7	–	0
Wofford	1	–	2	–	0	2	–	7	–	0
Louisville	1	–	2	–	1	2	–	3	–	1
Furman	1	–	3	–	0	4	–	5	–	0
Chattanooga	1	–	4	–	0	3	–	5	–	0
Florida	0	–	4	–	0	0	–	5	–	0
Mercer	0	–	5	–	0	1	–	6	–	0
Ole Miss	0	–	6	–	0	3	–	6	–	0
+ – Conference co-champions

The 1916 Howard Baptists football team was an American football team that represented Howard College (now known as the Samford University) as a member of the Southern Intercollegiate Athletic Association (SIAA) during the 1916 college football season. In their third year under head coach John B. Longwell, the team compiled an 6–4 record.

== Schedule ==
Date	Opponent	Site	Result	Source
September 30	Blountsville Aggies*	Howard Athletic Field; Birmingham, AL	W 28–0	
October 7	Auburn	Rickwood Field; Birmingham, AL	L 0–35	
October 13	Southern (AL)*	Howard Athletic Field; Birmingham, AL	W 28–0	
October 21	Mercer	Rickwood Field; Birmingham, AL	W 26–7	
October 30	at Marion*	Selma, AL	L 7–13	
November 4	at Alabama Presbyterian*	Anniston, AL	W 20–0	
November 11	at Hamilton Aggies*	Hamilton, AL	W 10–0	
November 17	Jacksonville State*	Howard Athletic Field; Birmingham, AL	W 27–0	
November 25	vs. Birmingham*	Rickwood Field; Birmingham, AL	L 0–15	
November 30	at Spring Hill*	Monroe Park; Mobile, AL	L 0–32	
*Non-conference game
