= Moon Ducote =

American football player and coach (1897–1937)

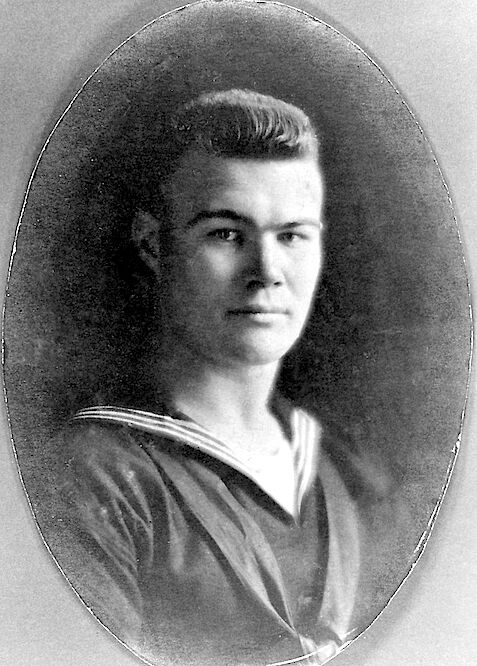
- Ducote in the Navy, 1918

Biographical details
- Born: August 28, 1897; Cottonport, Louisiana, U.S.
- Died: March 26, 1937 (aged 39); New Orleans, Louisiana, U.S.

Playing career

Football
- 1911–1914: Spring Hill
- 1915–1917: Auburn
- 1918: Cleveland Naval Reserve
- 1920: Cleveland Tigers

Baseball
- 1919–1921: Mobile Bears
- 1923: Portsmouth Truckers
- 1925–1926: Charlotte Hornets
- Positions: Fullback, end, guard (football); Outfielder (baseball)

Coaching career (HC unless noted)

Football
- 1919–1922: Spring Hill
- 1923: LSU (assistant)
- 1924–1925: Loyola (LA)
- 1933: Spring Hill
- 1934: Spring Hill (backfield/freshmen)
- 1935: Loyola (LA) (backfield)

Basketball
- 1923–1924: LSU
- 1935–1936: Loyola (LA) (assistant)

Baseball
- 1924: LSU

Administrative career (AD unless noted)
- 1936–1937: Loyola (LA)

Head coaching record
- Overall: 21–31–4 (football); 8–12 (basketball); 4–9 (baseball)

Accomplishments and honors

Awards
- 2× All-Southern (1916, 1917); 2nd team All-Service (1918); Louisiana Sports Hall of Fame

Richard Joseph "Moon" "Duke" DuCôté (/dʌˈkoʊti/ duh-KOH-tee; August 28, 1897 – March 26, 1937) was an American baseball, football, and basketball coach, football and baseball player, football official, and businessman. He first attended Spring Hill College and was a notable athlete at Auburn University. He played minor league baseball with the Mobile Bears, Portsmouth Truckers, and Charlotte Hornets. In 1920, he played with the Cleveland Tigers of the American Professional Football Association (APFA).

He served as the head football coach at Loyola University of New Orleans from 1924 to 1925 and at Spring Hill College for five non-consecutive years between 1919 and 1933. Ducote was the head baseball and basketball coach at Louisiana State University (LSU) in 1924.

== Early life ==
Ducote was born in Cottonport, Louisiana on August 28, 1897. He later resided in Mobile, Alabama where, as a Catholic, he attended Spring Hill College. It is figured he was known as "Moon" due to his large head.

=== Auburn ===
Ducote attended Auburn University, where he played on the Tigers football team under Mike Donahue from 1915 to 1917, primarily in the backfield as a fullback or halfback due to his skill at drop kicking, but also as a guard and end. Ducote stood 5 feet 10 inches (1.78 m) and weighed 187 pounds (85 kg). He was named to the All-Southern team in both 1916 and 1917, and was nominated for an Associated Press All-Time Southeast 1869-1919 era team. In 1933, Mike Donahue and Dr. John O. Rush published their choice for the "All-Time Auburn Football Team" in the Mobile Press-Register, which named Ducote as the fullback. Donahue noted that Ducote was "undoubtedly the best ever" according to The Tuscaloosa News.

In the 1916 game against Georgia, Ducote kicked a 40-yard field goal from placement off of captain Lucy Hairston's football helmet in the fourth quarter and in the mud, which proved the only points in the 3–0 Auburn victory. The maneuver prompted a rule that stated the ball must be kicked directly off the ground. Parke H. Davis described it thus:

Ducote falls back to try for a goal from the field. Hairston removes his leather helmet and places it upon the ground. He creases the top of the helmet and sights it for the goal. Spectators curiously watch the proceedings. Suddenly, the ball is passed. Hairston receives it, places it on the helmet, which all suddenly see it is to serve as a mechanical tee. Ducote leaps forward, kicks the ball from the top of the helmet and drives it straight as an arrow for Georgia's crossbar, over which it sails evenly between the posts."

The 1917 team held undefeated Big Ten champion Ohio State to a scoreless tie, but ran into a juggernaut in Georgia Tech, the South's first national champion, losing 68–7. Auburn's only points came when Ducote circled around end for 17 yards and lateraled to William Donahue, who ran down the sideline for a six-yard touchdown. Earlier in the game, Ducote broke through the line toward the goal, with blocking from Pete Bonner and Donahue. After Tech's Joe Guyon dove at Ducote and missed, Guyon gave chase and tackled him from behind at the 26-yard line.

=== Cleveland Naval Reserves ===
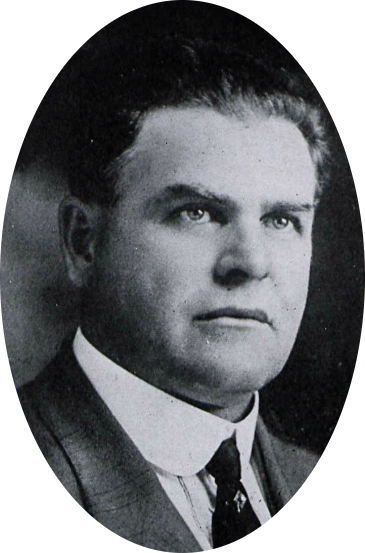
Pop Warner (pictured) said Ducote was "the greatest football player I ever saw"

Due to the First World War, Ducote played on the 1918 Cleveland Naval Reserve football team alongside Georgia Tech fullback Judy Harlan, which upset national champion Pittsburgh by a 10–9 score. Ducote kicked the winning 41-yard field goal. Pittsburgh coach Pop Warner refused to acknowledge the loss, but declared Ducote "the greatest football player I ever saw". Walter Camp selected him second-team All-Service. He was supposed to return to Auburn in 1919, but played baseball instead.

== Professional playing career ==
In 1920, Ducote played in one game for the Cleveland Tigers in the American Professional Football Association (later renamed the National Football League). From 1919 to 1921, he played minor league baseball with the Mobile Bears in the Southern Association. In 1923, he played for the Portsmouth Truckers of the Virginia League, and from 1925 to 1926, he played for the Charlotte Hornets of the South Atlantic League. During this time, he would spend the winters in New Orleans, where he served as a college football coach outside of the baseball season.

On January 9, 1926, he played as a member of the Southern All-Stars, which lost an exhibition game, 14–0, to the Red Grange-led Chicago Bears.

== Coaching career ==
=== Spring Hill ===
Spring Hill College hired Ducote as its football coach in December 1918. He coached the 1919 team before playing professionally in Cleveland. He returned to the position for the 1921 season, a post he held through 1922.

==== Rehired ====
In December 1932, Spring Hill College rehired Ducote as its head football coach. He resigned on June 1, 1935.

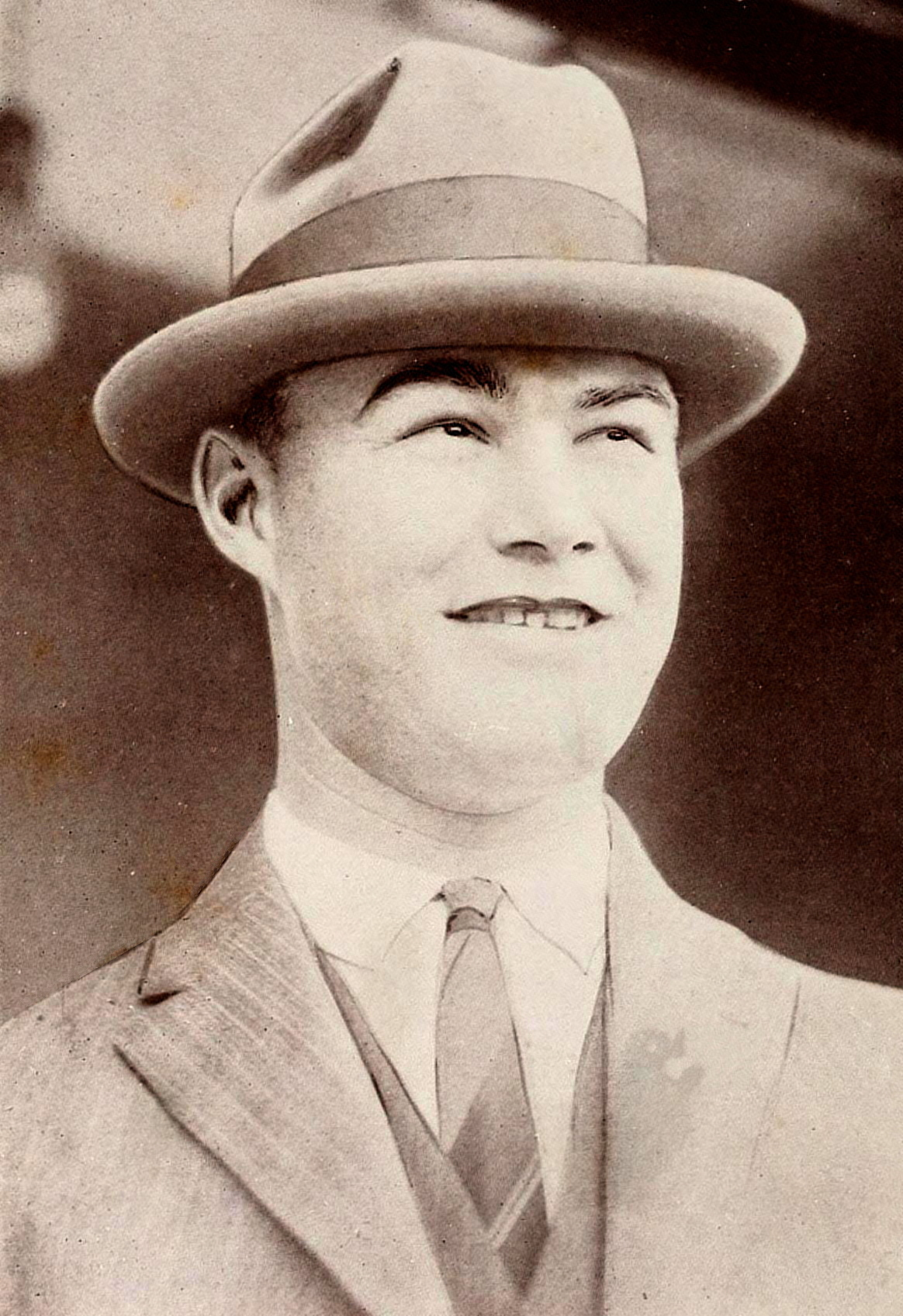
Ducote at Loyola in 1924

=== LSU ===
Ducote spent one season at Louisiana State University as head coach for the basketball and baseball teams. In basketball, he coached the Tigers to an 8–12 finish during the 1923–24 season. Ducote led the LSU baseball team to a 4–9 record in 1924.

=== Loyola ===
The Loyola University of New Orleans hired Ducote as its head football coach for the 1924 season. In the opener, Bo McMillin's Centenary routed Loyola, 51–0. Later in the year, the Wolves held Oglethorpe, the eventual Southern Intercollegiate Athletic Association champions, to a 13–13 tie. Loyola finished the season with a 3–4–2 record. Before the 1925 season, SIAA officials ruled several Loyola players ineligible to compete, including 14 first-string players. After losing four of their first five games, Loyola left the SIAA and put the previously disallowed players back into action, finishing with a 2–7 record.

==== Rehired ====
Loyola rehired Ducote as an assistant football and head basketball coach in March 1935. He rejoined the football staff as the backfield coach. Ducote was also Loyola's athletic director, serving from August 1936 until his death seven months later.

== Business ==
In the late 1920s, Ducote was the vice president and general manager of the Nu-Way Cleansing Service.

== Officiating ==
From 1929 to 1934, Ducote worked as a football official in the Southern Conference and Southeastern Conference, including as a linesman, umpire, and referee. Ducote helped officiate the 1935 Rose Bowl as the field judge.

On September 2, 1935, he was elected chairman of the Southern Football Officials' Association.

== Later life and death ==
In March 1937, he was hospitalized in New Orleans for several weeks with high blood pressure and was considered to be in critical condition. He died in the hospital on March 26, 1937, at the age of 39. He was inducted into the Louisiana Sports Hall of Fame in 2014.

== Head coaching record ==
=== Football ===
Year	Team	Overall	Conference	Standing	Bowl/playoffs
Spring Hill Badgers (Independent) (1919–1922)
1919	Spring Hill	3–3–1			
1920	Spring Hill	6–2			
1921	Spring Hill	4–4			
1922	Spring Hill	3–4–2			
Loyola Wolf Pack (Independent) (1924)
1924	Loyola	3–4–2			
Loyola Wolf Pack (Southern Intercollegiate Athletic Association) (1925)
1925	Loyola	2–7	1–3	T–15th	
Loyola:		5–11–2	1–3		
Spring Hill Badgers (Dixie Conference) (1933)
1933	Spring Hill	0–7–1	0–5	9th	
Spring Hill:		16–20–2			
Total:		21–31–4			

== See also ==
- List of college football head coaches with non-consecutive tenure
