= 1916 Mississippi College Collegians football team =

American college football season

1916 Mississippi College Collegians football
- Conference: Southern Intercollegiate Athletic Association
- Record: 6–3 (2–3 SIAA)
- Head coach: Dudy Noble (1st season)
- Home stadium: Provine Field

1916 Southern Intercollegiate Athletic Association football standings
	Conf.					Overall
Team	W		L		T	W		L		T
Georgia Tech +	5	–	0	–	0	8	–	0	–	1
Tennessee +	6	–	0	–	1	8	–	0	–	1
Vanderbilt	4	–	1	–	1	7	–	1	–	1
LSU	3	–	1	–	1	7	–	1	–	2
The Citadel	3	–	1	–	0	6	–	1	–	1
Tulane	2	–	1	–	1	4	–	3	–	1
Kentucky	2	–	1	–	2	4	–	1	–	2
Auburn	6	–	2	–	0	6	–	2	–	0
Georgia	5	–	2	–	0	6	–	3	–	0
Alabama	4	–	3	–	0	6	–	3	–	0
Sewanee	2	–	2	–	2	5	–	2	–	2
Centre	1	–	1	–	1	5	–	1	–	3
Howard (AL)	1	–	1	–	0	6	–	4	–	0
Georgetown (KY)	1	–	1	–	0	2	–	1	–	0
Mississippi A&M	3	–	4	–	0	4	–	4	–	1
Transylvania	2	–	3	–	1	3	–	3	–	2
Mississippi College	2	–	3	–	0	6	–	3	–	0
Clemson	2	–	4	–	0	3	–	6	–	0
South Carolina	2	–	4	–	0	2	–	7	–	0
Wofford	1	–	2	–	0	2	–	7	–	0
Louisville	1	–	2	–	1	2	–	3	–	1
Furman	1	–	3	–	0	4	–	5	–	0
Chattanooga	1	–	4	–	0	3	–	5	–	0
Florida	0	–	4	–	0	0	–	5	–	0
Mercer	0	–	5	–	0	1	–	6	–	0
Ole Miss	0	–	6	–	0	3	–	6	–	0
+ – Conference co-champions

The 1916 Mississippi College Collegians football team was an American football team that represented Mississippi College as a member of the Southern Intercollegiate Athletic Association (SIAA) during the 1916 college football season. In their first year under head coach Dudy Noble, the team compiled a 6–3 record.

== Schedule ==
Date	Opponent	Site	Result	Source
September 29	Marion*	Provine Field; Clinton, MS	W 32–0	
October 6	vs. Mississippi A&M	Aberdeen Fairgrounds; Aberdeen, MS	W 13–6	
October 14	at Alabama	University Field; Tuscaloosa, AL	L 7–13	
October 21	at LSU	State Field; Baton Rouge, LA	L 7–50	
October 27	Tulane	State Fairgrounds; Jackson, MS	L 3–13	
November 7	at Mississippi Normal*	Kamper Park; Hattiesburg, MS	W 75–0	
November 10	Louisiana Industrial*	Provine Field; Clinton, MS	W 47–0	
November 17	Ouachita*	Jackson, MS	W 26–0	
November 30	Ole Miss	State Fairgrounds; Jackson, MS	W 36–14	
*Non-conference game
