= 1916 Georgia Bulldogs football team =

American college football season

1916 Georgia Bulldogs football
- Conference: Southern Intercollegiate Athletic Association
- Record: 6–3 (5–2 SIAA)
- Head coach: W. A. Cunningham (7th season)
- Captain: Tom Thrash
- Home stadium: Sanford Field

Uniform
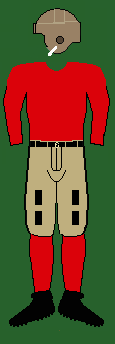

1916 Southern Intercollegiate Athletic Association football standings
	Conf.					Overall
Team	W		L		T	W		L		T
Georgia Tech +	5	–	0	–	0	8	–	0	–	1
Tennessee +	6	–	0	–	1	8	–	0	–	1
Vanderbilt	4	–	1	–	1	7	–	1	–	1
LSU	3	–	1	–	1	7	–	1	–	2
The Citadel	3	–	1	–	0	6	–	1	–	1
Tulane	2	–	1	–	1	4	–	3	–	1
Kentucky	2	–	1	–	2	4	–	1	–	2
Auburn	6	–	2	–	0	6	–	2	–	0
Georgia	5	–	2	–	0	6	–	3	–	0
Alabama	4	–	3	–	0	6	–	3	–	0
Sewanee	2	–	2	–	2	5	–	2	–	2
Centre	1	–	1	–	1	5	–	1	–	3
Howard (AL)	1	–	1	–	0	6	–	4	–	0
Georgetown (KY)	1	–	1	–	0	2	–	1	–	0
Mississippi A&M	3	–	4	–	0	4	–	4	–	1
Transylvania	2	–	3	–	1	3	–	3	–	2
Mississippi College	2	–	3	–	0	6	–	3	–	0
Clemson	2	–	4	–	0	3	–	6	–	0
South Carolina	2	–	4	–	0	2	–	7	–	0
Wofford	1	–	2	–	0	2	–	7	–	0
Louisville	1	–	2	–	1	2	–	3	–	1
Furman	1	–	3	–	0	4	–	5	–	0
Chattanooga	1	–	4	–	0	3	–	5	–	0
Florida	0	–	4	–	0	0	–	5	–	0
Mercer	0	–	5	–	0	1	–	6	–	0
Ole Miss	0	–	6	–	0	3	–	6	–	0
+ – Conference co-champions

The 1916 Georgia Bulldogs football team represented the University of Georgia during the 1916 Southern Intercollegiate Athletic Association football season. Led by seventh-year head coach W. A. Cunningham, the Bulldogs compiled an overall record of 6–3 with a mark of 5–2 in SIAA play. Tom Thrash was the team captain.

== Schedule ==
Date	Opponent	Site	Result	Source
September 30	The Citadel	Sanford Field; Athens, GA	W 6–0	
October 7	vs. Clemson	Anderson, SC (rivalry)	W 26–0	
October 14	Florida	Sanford Field; Athens, GA (rivalry)	W 21–0	
October 21	at Virginia*	Lambeth Field; Charlottesville, VA	W 13–7	
October 28	at Navy*	Worden Field; Annapolis, MD	L 3–27	
November 4	vs. Auburn	Lane's Field; Columbus, GA (rivalry)	L 0–3	
November 11	Furman	Sanford Field; Athens, GA	W 49–0	
November 18	Georgia Tech	Sanford Field; Athens, GA (rivalry)	L 0–21	
November 30	at Alabama	Rickwood Field; Birmingham, AL (rivalry)	W 3–0	
*Non-conference game

== Game summaries ==
=== The Citadel ===
To open the season, Georgia gave The Citadel the team's only loss

=== Clemson ===
In the second week of play, Georgia beat Clemson.

=== Florida ===
Florida at Georgia

Team	1	2	3	4	Total
Florida	0	0	0	0	0
• Georgia	0	0	7	14	21

- Date: October 14
- Location: Sanford Field
  Athens, GA
- Referee: Streit

Georgia beat the winless Florida Gators 21–0 in Athens. The contest was scoreless in the first half. Georgia had to send in two stars who were resting with dislocated shoulders. Walter Neville scored the game's first touchdown.

The starting lineup was Pew (left end), Thrash (left tackle), Ferguson (left guard), Garmany (center), Beaseley (right guard), Wingate (right tackle), Tate (right end), Dessendorff (quarterback), Coleman (left halfback), McLaws (right halfback), Neville (fullback).

=== Virginia ===
Georgia beat Virginia for the first time in 1916.

=== Navy ===
The year's first loss came in Georgia's first game against Navy.

=== Auburn ===
Beginning in 1916 and continuing until 1958, Georgia and Auburn played every game except one in Columbus, Georgia at the A. J. McClung Memorial Stadium. Coach Cunningham was the key to getting this series located at the neutral location in Columbus.

=== Furman ===
The Bulldogs beat Furman.

=== Georgia Tech ===
Georgia Tech at Georgia

Team	1	2	3	4	Total
• Ga. Tech	0	7	7	7	21
Georgia	0	0	0	0	0

- Date: November 18
- Location: Sanford Field
  Athens, GA
- Game attendance: 10,000
- Referee: Nicholls (Chicago)

Georgia loss to rival Georgia Tech 21–0 in Tech's only road game. After a scoreless first quarter, Talley Johnston ran for 25 yards around right end, and plunges from Tommy Spence soon got a touchdown. In the third quarter, Spence scored again. Tech was then aided by a half-the-distance-to-the-goal penalty by Georgia. The drive ended with a 15–yard touchdown run from Everett Strupper. The starting lineup was: Tate (left end), Thrash (left tackle), Wingate (left guard), Garmany (center), Beasley (right guard), McConnell (right tackle), Dexendorf (right end), Donnelly (quarterback), McLaws (left halfback), Reynolds (right halfback), and Neville (fullback).

=== Alabama ===
Georgia beat Alabama 3–0. William Donnelly made a kick from placement. The starting lineup was Neville (left end), Thrash (left tackle), Garmany (left guard), Pew (center), Wingate (right guard), McConnell (right tackle), Tate (right end), Donnelly (quarterback), Coleman (left halfback), Moore (right halfback), Dezendorff (fullback).
