= 1916 Clemson Tigers football team =

American college football season

1916 Clemson Tigers football
- Conference: Southern Intercollegiate Athletic Association
- Record: 3–6 (2–4 SIAA)
- Head coach: Wayne Hart (1st season)
- Captain: S. S. Major
- Home stadium: Riggs Field

1916 Southern Intercollegiate Athletic Association football standings
	Conf.					Overall
Team	W		L		T	W		L		T
Georgia Tech +	5	–	0	–	0	8	–	0	–	1
Tennessee +	6	–	0	–	1	8	–	0	–	1
Vanderbilt	4	–	1	–	1	7	–	1	–	1
LSU	3	–	1	–	1	7	–	1	–	2
The Citadel	3	–	1	–	0	6	–	1	–	1
Tulane	2	–	1	–	1	4	–	3	–	1
Kentucky	2	–	1	–	2	4	–	1	–	2
Auburn	6	–	2	–	0	6	–	2	–	0
Georgia	5	–	2	–	0	6	–	3	–	0
Alabama	4	–	3	–	0	6	–	3	–	0
Sewanee	2	–	2	–	2	5	–	2	–	2
Centre	1	–	1	–	1	5	–	1	–	3
Howard (AL)	1	–	1	–	0	6	–	4	–	0
Georgetown (KY)	1	–	1	–	0	2	–	1	–	0
Mississippi A&M	3	–	4	–	0	4	–	4	–	1
Transylvania	2	–	3	–	1	3	–	3	–	2
Mississippi College	2	–	3	–	0	6	–	3	–	0
Clemson	2	–	4	–	0	3	–	6	–	0
South Carolina	2	–	4	–	0	2	–	7	–	0
Wofford	1	–	2	–	0	2	–	7	–	0
Louisville	1	–	2	–	1	2	–	3	–	1
Furman	1	–	3	–	0	4	–	5	–	0
Chattanooga	1	–	4	–	0	3	–	5	–	0
Florida	0	–	4	–	0	0	–	5	–	0
Mercer	0	–	5	–	0	1	–	6	–	0
Ole Miss	0	–	6	–	0	3	–	6	–	0
+ – Conference co-champions

The 1916 Clemson Tigers football team represented Clemson Agricultural College—now known as Clemson University—as a member of the Southern Intercollegiate Athletic Association (SIAA) during the 1916 college football season. Led by Wayne Hart in his first and only season as head coach, the Tigers compiled an overall record of 3–6 with a mark of 2–4 in SIAA play. S. S. Major was the team captain.

Stumpy Banks caught two touchdowns against rival South Carolina.

== Schedule ==
Date	Opponent	Site	Result	Source
September 30	Furman	Riggs Field; Calhoun, SC	W 7–6	
October 7	vs. Georgia	Anderson, SC (rivalry)	L 0–26	
October 14	Tennessee	Riggs Field; Calhoun, SC	L 0–14	
October 20	at Auburn	Drake Field; Auburn, AL (rivalry)	L 0–28	
October 26	at South Carolina	State Fairgrounds; Columbia, SC (rivalry)	W 27–0	
November 11	vs. VMI*	Broad Street Park; Richmond, VA	L 7–37	
November 16	at The Citadel	County Fairgrounds; Orangeburg, SC	L 0–3	
November 22	Presbyterian*	Riggs Field; Calhoun, SC	W 40–0	
November 30	vs. Davidson*	Wearn Field; Charlotte, NC	L 0–33	
*Non-conference game
