= David Peacock (American football) =

American politician (1890–1944)

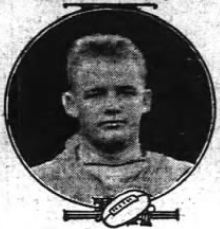
- Peacock, c. 1912

Biographical details
- Born: March 15, 1890; Eastman, Georgia, U.S.
- Died: January 28, 1944 (aged 53); St. Petersburg, Florida, U.S.

Playing career
- 1910–1912: Georgia
- Position: Guard

Coaching career (HC unless noted)
- 1914: Georgia (assistant)
- 1916: Mercer

Head coaching record
- Overall: 0–4

Accomplishments and honors

Awards
- 2× All-Southern (1911, 1912)

David Roscoe "Emp" Peacock (March 15, 1890 – January 28, 1944) was an American college football player and coach, lawyer, and politician. Peacock played football at the University of Georgia from 1910 to 1912. He was the head football coach at Mercer University, in Macon, Georgia, for the final four games of 1916 season. Peacock was elected to the Georgia State Senate in 1916 and served as president pro-tempore. He later practiced law in Eastman, Georgia, and Bradenton, Florida.

== College football career ==
=== Playing ===
As a player, he was an All-Southern guard captain for the Georgia Bulldogs of the University of Georgia in 1912. An Athens newspaper said he was "probably the most aggressive lineman in the South." He weighed 185 pounds.

=== Coaching ===
Peacock was an assistant for the 1914 Georgia Bulldogs, leaving to get his master's degree at the University of Michigan. In October 1916, Peacock took over midseason as head football coach at Mercer University in Macon, Georgia. He succeeded Jake Zellars, who was recalled into military service.

== Military service, legal and political career, and later life ==
Peacock was elected to the Georgia State Senate in 1916 and served there as president pro-tempore until resigning to entering military service during World War I. He was a first lieutenant and was cited for bravery in action. He attended Sorbonne University in Paris after the war and earned a diploma. Peacock then returned to Eastman, Georgia to practice law. In 1920, he was a candidate for the United States House of Representatives from Georgia's 12th congressional district. Peacock relocated to Bradenton, Florida, in 1925, where he practiced law with J. B. Singeltary. He retired from law in 1939 due to ill health and was thereafter engaged in farming and the cattle business.

Peacock died on January 28, 1944, at Bay Pines Veteran's Hospital in St. Petersburg, Florida.

== Head coaching record ==
Year	Team	Overall	Conference	Standing	Bowl/playoffs
Mercer Baptists (Southern Intercollegiate Athletic Association) (1916)
1916	Mercer	0–4 (Note: Jake Zellars served as Mercer's head coach for the first three games of the 1916 season before being recalled into military service. Peacock led the team for the remainder of the year. Mercer finished the season 1–6 overall and 0–5 in conference play.)	0–3	25th	
Mercer:		0–4	0–3		
Total:		0–4			
