= 1916 Mississippi A&M Aggies football team =

American college football season

1916 Mississippi A&M Aggies football
- Conference: Southern Intercollegiate Athletic Association
- Record: 4–4–1 (3–4 SIAA)
- Head coach: Earl C. Hayes (3rd season)
- Home stadium: New Athletic Field

1916 Southern Intercollegiate Athletic Association football standings
	Conf.					Overall
Team	W		L		T	W		L		T
Georgia Tech +	5	–	0	–	0	8	–	0	–	1
Tennessee +	6	–	0	–	1	8	–	0	–	1
Vanderbilt	4	–	1	–	1	7	–	1	–	1
LSU	3	–	1	–	1	7	–	1	–	2
The Citadel	3	–	1	–	0	6	–	1	–	1
Tulane	2	–	1	–	1	4	–	3	–	1
Kentucky	2	–	1	–	2	4	–	1	–	2
Auburn	6	–	2	–	0	6	–	2	–	0
Georgia	5	–	2	–	0	6	–	3	–	0
Alabama	4	–	3	–	0	6	–	3	–	0
Sewanee	2	–	2	–	2	5	–	2	–	2
Centre	1	–	1	–	1	5	–	1	–	3
Howard (AL)	1	–	1	–	0	6	–	4	–	0
Georgetown (KY)	1	–	1	–	0	2	–	1	–	0
Mississippi A&M	3	–	4	–	0	4	–	4	–	1
Transylvania	2	–	3	–	1	3	–	3	–	2
Mississippi College	2	–	3	–	0	6	–	3	–	0
Clemson	2	–	4	–	0	3	–	6	–	0
South Carolina	2	–	4	–	0	2	–	7	–	0
Wofford	1	–	2	–	0	2	–	7	–	0
Louisville	1	–	2	–	1	2	–	3	–	1
Furman	1	–	3	–	0	4	–	5	–	0
Chattanooga	1	–	4	–	0	3	–	5	–	0
Florida	0	–	4	–	0	0	–	5	–	0
Mercer	0	–	5	–	0	1	–	6	–	0
Ole Miss	0	–	6	–	0	3	–	6	–	0
+ – Conference co-champions

The 1916 Mississippi A&M Aggies football team represented The Agricultural and Mechanical College of the State of Mississippi (now known as Mississippi State University) as a member of the Southern Intercollegiate Athletic Association (SIAA) during the 1916 college football season. Led by third-year head coach Earl C. Hayes, the Aggies compiled an overall record of 4–4–1, with a mark of 3–4 in conference play. Mississippi A&M played home games at the New Athletic Field in Starkville, Mississippi.

== Schedule ==
Date	Opponent	Site	Result	Source
October 6	vs. Mississippi College	Aberdeen Fairgrounds; Aberdeen, MS	L 6–13	
October 14	at Chattanooga	Chamberlain Field; Chattanooga, TN	W 33–0	
October 21	Transylvania	New Athletic Field; Starkville, MS	W 13–0	
October 28	at Auburn	Rickwood Field; Birmingham, AL	L 3–7	
November 3	vs. Ole Miss	Fairgrounds; Tupelo, MS (rivalry)	W 36–0	
November 11	LSU	New Athletic Field; Starkville, MS (rivalry)	L 3–13	
November 18	at Kentucky	Stoll Field; Lexington, KY	L 3–13	
November 20	at Maryville (TN)*	Maryville, TN	T 7–7	
November 30	vs. Arkansas*	Russwood Park; Memphis, TN	W 20–7	
*Non-conference game
