= 1916 Mercer Baptists football team =

American college football season

1916 Mercer Baptists football
- Conference: Southern Intercollegiate Athletic Association
- Record: 1–6 (0–5 SIAA)
- Head coach: Jake Zellars (2nd season; first 3 games); David Peacock (1st season; final 4 games)
- Home stadium: Central City Park

1916 Southern Intercollegiate Athletic Association football standings
	Conf.					Overall
Team	W		L		T	W		L		T
Georgia Tech +	5	–	0	–	0	8	–	0	–	1
Tennessee +	6	–	0	–	1	8	–	0	–	1
Vanderbilt	4	–	1	–	1	7	–	1	–	1
LSU	3	–	1	–	1	7	–	1	–	2
The Citadel	3	–	1	–	0	6	–	1	–	1
Tulane	2	–	1	–	1	4	–	3	–	1
Kentucky	2	–	1	–	2	4	–	1	–	2
Auburn	6	–	2	–	0	6	–	2	–	0
Georgia	5	–	2	–	0	6	–	3	–	0
Alabama	4	–	3	–	0	6	–	3	–	0
Sewanee	2	–	2	–	2	5	–	2	–	2
Centre	1	–	1	–	1	5	–	1	–	3
Howard (AL)	1	–	1	–	0	6	–	4	–	0
Georgetown (KY)	1	–	1	–	0	2	–	1	–	0
Mississippi A&M	3	–	4	–	0	4	–	4	–	1
Transylvania	2	–	3	–	1	3	–	3	–	2
Mississippi College	2	–	3	–	0	6	–	3	–	0
Clemson	2	–	4	–	0	3	–	6	–	0
South Carolina	2	–	4	–	0	2	–	7	–	0
Wofford	1	–	2	–	0	2	–	7	–	0
Louisville	1	–	2	–	1	2	–	3	–	1
Furman	1	–	3	–	0	4	–	5	–	0
Chattanooga	1	–	4	–	0	3	–	5	–	0
Florida	0	–	4	–	0	0	–	5	–	0
Mercer	0	–	5	–	0	1	–	6	–	0
Ole Miss	0	–	6	–	0	3	–	6	–	0
+ – Conference co-champions

The 1916 Mercer Baptists football team was an American football team that represented Mercer University as a member of the Southern Intercollegiate Athletic Association (SIAA) during the 1916 college football season. The Baptists began the year under second-year under head coach Jake Zellars, who was recalled into military service in early October, after the team's first three games. David Peacock took over as head coach for the remainder of the year. Mercer finished the season with an overall record of 1–6 record and a mark of 0–5 in SIAA play.

== Schedule ==
Date	Opponent	Site	Result	Source
September 23	Georgia Military*	Central City Park; Macon, GA	W 7–0	
September 30	at Georgia Tech	Grant Field; Atlanta, GA	L 0–61	
October 7	at Chattanooga	Chamberlain Field; Chattanooga, TN	L 0–49	
October 14	at Auburn	Drake Field; Auburn, AL	L 0–92	
October 21	at Howard (AL)	Rickwood Field; Birmingham, AL	L 7–26	
October 28	at Columbia College (FL)*	Lake City, FL	L 0–7	
November 18	at South Carolina	Davis Field; Columbia, SC	L 0–47	
*Non-conference game
