= 1916 Alabama Crimson Tide football team =

American college football season

1916 Alabama Crimson Tide football
- Conference: Southern Intercollegiate Athletic Association
- Record: 6–3 (4–3 SIAA)
- Head coach: Thomas Kelley (2nd season)
- Captain: Lowndes Morton
- Home stadium: University Field; Rickwood Field

1916 Southern Intercollegiate Athletic Association football standings
	Conf.					Overall
Team	W		L		T	W		L		T
Georgia Tech +	5	–	0	–	0	8	–	0	–	1
Tennessee +	6	–	0	–	1	8	–	0	–	1
Vanderbilt	4	–	1	–	1	7	–	1	–	1
LSU	3	–	1	–	1	7	–	1	–	2
The Citadel	3	–	1	–	0	6	–	1	–	1
Tulane	2	–	1	–	1	4	–	3	–	1
Kentucky	2	–	1	–	2	4	–	1	–	2
Auburn	6	–	2	–	0	6	–	2	–	0
Georgia	5	–	2	–	0	6	–	3	–	0
Alabama	4	–	3	–	0	6	–	3	–	0
Sewanee	2	–	2	–	2	5	–	2	–	2
Centre	1	–	1	–	1	5	–	1	–	3
Howard (AL)	1	–	1	–	0	6	–	4	–	0
Georgetown (KY)	1	–	1	–	0	2	–	1	–	0
Mississippi A&M	3	–	4	–	0	4	–	4	–	1
Transylvania	2	–	3	–	1	3	–	3	–	2
Mississippi College	2	–	3	–	0	6	–	3	–	0
Clemson	2	–	4	–	0	3	–	6	–	0
South Carolina	2	–	4	–	0	2	–	7	–	0
Wofford	1	–	2	–	0	2	–	7	–	0
Louisville	1	–	2	–	1	2	–	3	–	1
Furman	1	–	3	–	0	4	–	5	–	0
Chattanooga	1	–	4	–	0	3	–	5	–	0
Florida	0	–	4	–	0	0	–	5	–	0
Mercer	0	–	5	–	0	1	–	6	–	0
Ole Miss	0	–	6	–	0	3	–	6	–	0
+ – Conference co-champions

The 1916 Alabama Crimson Tide football team (variously "Alabama", "UA" or "Bama") represented the University of Alabama in the 1916 college football season. It was the Crimson Tide's 24th overall and 21st season as a member of the Southern Intercollegiate Athletic Association (SIAA). The team was led by head coach Thomas Kelley, in his second year, and played their home games at University Field in Tuscaloosa and at Rickwood Field in Birmingham, Alabama. They finished the season with a record an overall record of 6–3 and a mark of 4–3 in the SIAA.

Three brothers, Dexter, Walter, and Jack Hovater, were starters for the 1916 Tide.

Alabama opened the season with six consecutive victories over Birmingham College and Southern College (now combined as Birmingham–Southern College), Mississippi College, Florida, Ole Miss and Sewanee. In those six games, Alabama outscored their opponents by a margin of 156 to 13. Sewanee almost beat Bama after making two interceptions and stopping Bama on 4th and goal at the 1, but Alabama scored late and kicked the extra point (Sewanee's having failed) for the victory. The defeat of Ole Miss was thanks to a late rally.

However, they were shut out in the final three games with losses to Georgia Tech, Tulane and Georgia to finish with an overall record of 6–3. Georgia Tech held Alabama to two first downs and 60 yards of offense.

== Schedule ==
Date	Opponent	Site	Result	Source
September 30	Birmingham*	University Field; Tuscaloosa, AL	W 13–0	
October 7	Southern (AL)*	University Field; Tuscaloosa, AL	W 80–0	
October 14	Mississippi College	University Field; Tuscaloosa, AL	W 13–7	
October 21	at Florida	Fleming Field; Gainesville, FL (rivalry)	W 16–0	
October 28	Ole Miss	University Field; Tuscaloosa, AL (rivalry)	W 27–0	
November 4	Sewanee	Rickwood Field; Birmingham, AL	W 7–6	
November 11	at Georgia Tech	Grant Field; Atlanta, GA (rivalry)	L 0–13	
November 18	at Tulane	New Orleans Fair Grounds; New Orleans, LA	L 0–33	
November 30	Georgia	Rickwood Field; Birmingham, AL (rivalry)	L 0–3	
*Non-conference game

== Personnel ==
=== Varsity letter winners ===
Player	Hometown	Position
Robert C. Brown	Ensley, Alabama	Back
Cecil L. Creen	Anniston, Alabama	Back
Fred Harrison Gage	Hampton, New Hampshire	Back
James H. “Dink” Hagan		Quarterback
J. Goree Johnson	Wetumpka, Alabama	Fullback
Joseph Allen Lowman	Birmingham, Alabama	End
Bill Marsh	Birmingham, Alabama	Back
Dave Mayfield	Jacksonville, Florida	Tackle
Lowndes Morton	Birmingham, Alabama	End
Ike Rogers	Vina, Alabama	Tackle
Conner Samford	Montgomery, Alabama	Guard
Calhoun “Sunbeam” Saul	Montgomery, Alabama	Guard
Lovick Leonidas Stephenson	Birmingham, Alabama	End
Max Frederick Stowers	Attalla, Alabama	Quarterback
Edward Verner		Manager
C. S. Whittlesley	Opelika, Alabama	Guard

=== Coaching staff ===
Name	Position	Seasons at Alabama	Alma mater
Thomas Kelly	Head coach	2	
B. L. Noojin	Assistant coach	2	Alabama (1908)
