= 1916 LSU Tigers football team =

American college football season

1916 LSU Tigers football
- Conference: Southern Intercollegiate Athletic Association
- Record: 7–1–2 (3–1–1 SIAA)
- Head coach: E. T. McDonald (3rd season; first 5 games); Irving Pray (1st season, games 6–7); Dana X. Bible (1st season, final 3 games)
- Captain: Phillip Cooper
- Home stadium: State Field

1916 Southern Intercollegiate Athletic Association football standings
	Conf.					Overall
Team	W		L		T	W		L		T
Georgia Tech +	5	–	0	–	0	8	–	0	–	1
Tennessee +	6	–	0	–	1	8	–	0	–	1
Vanderbilt	4	–	1	–	1	7	–	1	–	1
LSU	3	–	1	–	1	7	–	1	–	2
The Citadel	3	–	1	–	0	6	–	1	–	1
Tulane	2	–	1	–	1	4	–	3	–	1
Kentucky	2	–	1	–	2	4	–	1	–	2
Auburn	6	–	2	–	0	6	–	2	–	0
Georgia	5	–	2	–	0	6	–	3	–	0
Alabama	4	–	3	–	0	6	–	3	–	0
Sewanee	2	–	2	–	2	5	–	2	–	2
Centre	1	–	1	–	1	5	–	1	–	3
Howard (AL)	1	–	1	–	0	6	–	4	–	0
Georgetown (KY)	1	–	1	–	0	2	–	1	–	0
Mississippi A&M	3	–	4	–	0	4	–	4	–	1
Transylvania	2	–	3	–	1	3	–	3	–	2
Mississippi College	2	–	3	–	0	6	–	3	–	0
Clemson	2	–	4	–	0	3	–	6	–	0
South Carolina	2	–	4	–	0	2	–	7	–	0
Wofford	1	–	2	–	0	2	–	7	–	0
Louisville	1	–	2	–	1	2	–	3	–	1
Furman	1	–	3	–	0	4	–	5	–	0
Chattanooga	1	–	4	–	0	3	–	5	–	0
Florida	0	–	4	–	0	0	–	5	–	0
Mercer	0	–	5	–	0	1	–	6	–	0
Ole Miss	0	–	6	–	0	3	–	6	–	0
+ – Conference co-champions

The 1916 LSU Tigers football team represented the University of Louisiana (now known as Louisiana State University or LSU) as a member of the Southern Intercollegiate Athletic Association (SIAA) during the 1916 college football season. Led by three separate head coaches, the Tigers compiled an overall record of 7–1–2, with a mark of 3–1–1 in conference play, and finished fourth in the SIAA. LSU played home games at State Field in Baton Rouge, Louisiana.

== Schedule ==
Date	Opponent	Site	Result	Attendance	Source
September 30	at Southwestern Louisiana*	Lafayette, LA	W 24–0		
October 7	Jefferson (LA)*	State Field; Baton Rouge, LA	W 59–0		
October 14	vs. Texas A&M*	Galveston, TX (rivalry)	W 13–0		
October 21	Mississippi College	State Field; Baton Rouge, LA	W 50–7		
October 28	vs. Sewanee	Heinemann Park; New Orleans, LA	L 0–7	4,000	
November 4	vs. Arkansas*	Fair Grounds; Shreveport, LA (rivalry)	W 17–7		
November 11	at Mississippi A&M	New Athletic Field; Starkville, MS (rivalry)	W 13–3		
November 18	Ole Miss	State Field; Baton Rouge, LA (rivalry)	W 41–0		
November 24	Rice	State Field; Baton Rouge, LA	T 7–7		
November 30	at Tulane	Tulane Stadium; New Orleans, LA (rivalry)	T 14–14		
*Non-conference game
