= 1916 Chattanooga Moccasins football team =

American college football season

1916 Chattanooga Moccasins football
- Conference: Southern Intercollegiate Athletic Association
- Record: 3–5 (1–4 SIAA)
- Head coach: Johnny Spiegel (2nd season)
- Captain: Ernest Eldridge
- Home stadium: Chamberlain Field

1916 Southern Intercollegiate Athletic Association football standings
	Conf.					Overall
Team	W		L		T	W		L		T
Georgia Tech +	5	–	0	–	0	8	–	0	–	1
Tennessee +	6	–	0	–	1	8	–	0	–	1
Vanderbilt	4	–	1	–	1	7	–	1	–	1
LSU	3	–	1	–	1	7	–	1	–	2
The Citadel	3	–	1	–	0	6	–	1	–	1
Tulane	2	–	1	–	1	4	–	3	–	1
Kentucky	2	–	1	–	2	4	–	1	–	2
Auburn	6	–	2	–	0	6	–	2	–	0
Georgia	5	–	2	–	0	6	–	3	–	0
Alabama	4	–	3	–	0	6	–	3	–	0
Sewanee	2	–	2	–	2	5	–	2	–	2
Centre	1	–	1	–	1	5	–	1	–	3
Howard (AL)	1	–	1	–	0	6	–	4	–	0
Georgetown (KY)	1	–	1	–	0	2	–	1	–	0
Mississippi A&M	3	–	4	–	0	4	–	4	–	1
Transylvania	2	–	3	–	1	3	–	3	–	2
Mississippi College	2	–	3	–	0	6	–	3	–	0
Clemson	2	–	4	–	0	3	–	6	–	0
South Carolina	2	–	4	–	0	2	–	7	–	0
Wofford	1	–	2	–	0	2	–	7	–	0
Louisville	1	–	2	–	1	2	–	3	–	1
Furman	1	–	3	–	0	4	–	5	–	0
Chattanooga	1	–	4	–	0	3	–	5	–	0
Florida	0	–	4	–	0	0	–	5	–	0
Mercer	0	–	5	–	0	1	–	6	–	0
Ole Miss	0	–	6	–	0	3	–	6	–	0
+ – Conference co-champions

The 1916 Chattanooga Moccasins football team represented the University of Chattanooga—now known as the University of Tennessee at Chattanooga—as a member of the Southern Intercollegiate Athletic Association (SIAA) during the 1916 college football season. Led by Johnny Spiegel in his second and final year as head coach, the Moccasins compiled an overall record of 3–5 with a mark of 1–4 in conference play.

== Schedule ==
Date	Opponent	Site	Result	Source
September 30	Middle Tennessee State Normal*	Chamberlain Field; Chattanooga, TN	W 20–6	
October 7	Mercer	Chamberlain Field; Chattanooga, TN	W 49–0	
October 14	Mississippi A&M	Chamberlain Field; Chattanooga, TN	L 0–33	
October 21	at Louisville	Eclipse Park; Louisville, KY	L 0–6	
October 28	at Emory and Henry*	Fairmount Park; Bristol, TN	W 27–0	
November 4	Tennessee	Chamberlain Field; Chattanooga, TN	L 7–12	
November 11	at Sewanee	Hardee Field; Sewanee, TN	L 0–54	
November 25	at Washington & Jefferson*	Washington, PA	L 0–41	
*Non-conference game
