= 1916 Sewanee Tigers football team =

American college football season

1916 Sewanee Tigers football
- Conference: Southern Intercollegiate Athletic Association
- Record: 5–2–2 (2–2–2 SIAA)
- Head coach: Harris G. Cope (8th season)
- Captain: Neil Edmond
- Home stadium: Hardee Field

1916 Southern Intercollegiate Athletic Association football standings
	Conf.					Overall
Team	W		L		T	W		L		T
Georgia Tech +	5	–	0	–	0	8	–	0	–	1
Tennessee +	6	–	0	–	1	8	–	0	–	1
Vanderbilt	4	–	1	–	1	7	–	1	–	1
LSU	3	–	1	–	1	7	–	1	–	2
The Citadel	3	–	1	–	0	6	–	1	–	1
Tulane	2	–	1	–	1	4	–	3	–	1
Kentucky	2	–	1	–	2	4	–	1	–	2
Auburn	6	–	2	–	0	6	–	2	–	0
Georgia	5	–	2	–	0	6	–	3	–	0
Alabama	4	–	3	–	0	6	–	3	–	0
Sewanee	2	–	2	–	2	5	–	2	–	2
Centre	1	–	1	–	1	5	–	1	–	3
Howard (AL)	1	–	1	–	0	6	–	4	–	0
Georgetown (KY)	1	–	1	–	0	2	–	1	–	0
Mississippi A&M	3	–	4	–	0	4	–	4	–	1
Transylvania	2	–	3	–	1	3	–	3	–	2
Mississippi College	2	–	3	–	0	6	–	3	–	0
Clemson	2	–	4	–	0	3	–	6	–	0
South Carolina	2	–	4	–	0	2	–	7	–	0
Wofford	1	–	2	–	0	2	–	7	–	0
Louisville	1	–	2	–	1	2	–	3	–	1
Furman	1	–	3	–	0	4	–	5	–	0
Chattanooga	1	–	4	–	0	3	–	5	–	0
Florida	0	–	4	–	0	0	–	5	–	0
Mercer	0	–	5	–	0	1	–	6	–	0
Ole Miss	0	–	6	–	0	3	–	6	–	0
+ – Conference co-champions

The 1916 Sewanee Tigers football team represented Sewanee: The University of the South during the 1916 college football season as a member of the Southern Intercollegiate Athletic Association (SIAA). The Tigers were led by head coach Harris G. Cope in his eighth season and finished with a record of five wins, two losses, and two ties (5–2–2 overall, 2–2–2 in the SIAA).

== Schedule ==
Date	Opponent	Site	Result	Attendance	Source
September 30	Cumberland (TN)*	Hardee Field; Sewanee, TN	W 107–0		
October 7	Morgan Training School*	Hardee Field; Sewanee, TN	W 54–0		
October 14	Maryville (TN)*	Hardee Field; Sewanee, TN	W 68–7		
October 21	at Kentucky	Stoll Field; Lexington, KY	T 0–0		
October 28	vs. LSU	Heinemann Park; New Orleans, LA	W 7–0	4,000	
November 4	at Alabama	Rickwood Field; Birmingham, AL	L 6–7		
November 11	Chattanooga	Hardee Field; Sewanee, TN	W 54–0		
November 18	vs. Tennessee	Andrews Field; Chattanooga, TN	L 0–17	500	
November 30	at Vanderbilt	Dudley Field; Nashville, TN (rivalry)	T 0–0		
*Non-conference game
