= Wayne Hart =

American football player, coach, and administrator (1889–1970)

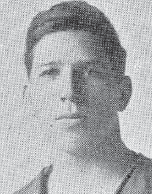

Biographical details
- Born: September 10, 1889; Washington, D.C., U.S.
- Died: April 1970 (aged 80); Morris County, New Jersey, U.S.
- Education: George Washington University; Georgetown University (1912)

Playing career
- 1908–1911: Georgetown
- Position: Tackle

Coaching career (HC unless noted)
- 1912–1913: Georgetown (assistant)
- 1914–1915: McKinley Manual (DC)
- 1915: Gallaudet
- 1916: Clemson

Head coaching record
- Overall: 3–6 (college, Clemson only)

Wayne Maris Hart (September 10, 1889 – April 1970) was an American football player, coach, and college athletics administrator. He served as the head football coach at Clemson University for one season in 1916, compiling a record of 3–6. Hart was also Clemson's athletic director in 1916. Born in Washington, D.C., he was an alumnus of Georgetown University and George Washington University. He played football as a tackle at Georgetown from 1908 to 1911. Hart was an assistant coach at Georgetown in 1912. He coached at the McKinley Manual Training School in Washington in 1914 and 1915. In 1915 he was named the head football coach at Gallaudet College—now known as Gallaudet University.

== Head coaching record ==
=== College ===
Year	Team	Overall	Conference	Standing	Bowl/playoffs
Clemson Tigers (Southern Intercollegiate Athletic Association) (1916)
1916	Clemson	3–6	2–4	17th	
Clemson:		3–6	2–4		
Total:		3–6			
