= 1916 Ole Miss Rebels football team =

American college football season

1916 Ole Miss Rebels football
- Conference: Southern Intercollegiate Athletic Association
- Record: 3–6 (0–6 SIAA)
- Head coach: Fred A. Robins (2nd season)
- Home stadium: Hemingway Stadium

1916 Southern Intercollegiate Athletic Association football standings
	Conf.					Overall
Team	W		L		T	W		L		T
Georgia Tech +	5	–	0	–	0	8	–	0	–	1
Tennessee +	6	–	0	–	1	8	–	0	–	1
Vanderbilt	4	–	1	–	1	7	–	1	–	1
LSU	3	–	1	–	1	7	–	1	–	2
The Citadel	3	–	1	–	0	6	–	1	–	1
Tulane	2	–	1	–	1	4	–	3	–	1
Kentucky	2	–	1	–	2	4	–	1	–	2
Auburn	6	–	2	–	0	6	–	2	–	0
Georgia	5	–	2	–	0	6	–	3	–	0
Alabama	4	–	3	–	0	6	–	3	–	0
Sewanee	2	–	2	–	2	5	–	2	–	2
Centre	1	–	1	–	1	5	–	1	–	3
Howard (AL)	1	–	1	–	0	6	–	4	–	0
Georgetown (KY)	1	–	1	–	0	2	–	1	–	0
Mississippi A&M	3	–	4	–	0	4	–	4	–	1
Transylvania	2	–	3	–	1	3	–	3	–	2
Mississippi College	2	–	3	–	0	6	–	3	–	0
Clemson	2	–	4	–	0	3	–	6	–	0
South Carolina	2	–	4	–	0	2	–	7	–	0
Wofford	1	–	2	–	0	2	–	7	–	0
Louisville	1	–	2	–	1	2	–	3	–	1
Furman	1	–	3	–	0	4	–	5	–	0
Chattanooga	1	–	4	–	0	3	–	5	–	0
Florida	0	–	4	–	0	0	–	5	–	0
Mercer	0	–	5	–	0	1	–	6	–	0
Ole Miss	0	–	6	–	0	3	–	6	–	0
+ – Conference co-champions

The 1916 Ole Miss Rebels football team represented the University of Mississippi (Ole Miss) as a member of the Southern Intercollegiate Athletic Association (SIAA) during the 1916 college football season. Led by second-year head coach Fred A. Robins, the Rebels compiled an overall record of 3–6, with a mark of 0–6 in conference play. Ole Miss played home games at Hemingway Stadium in Oxford, Mississippi.

== Schedule ==
Date	Opponent	Site	Result	Source
September 30	Union (TN)*	Hemingway Stadium; Oxford, MS	W 30–0	
October 7	Jonesboro Aggies*	Hemingway Stadium; Oxford, MS	W 20–0	
October 13	Hendrix*	Hemingway Stadium; Oxford, MS	W 51–0	
October 21	at Vanderbilt	Dudley Field; Nashville, TN (rivalry)	L 0–35	
October 28	at Alabama	University Field; Tuscaloosa, AL (rivalry)	L 0–27	
November 3	vs. Mississippi A&M	Tupelo, MS (Egg Bowl)	L 0–36	
November 11	at Transylvania	Thomas Field; Lexington, KY	L 3–13	
November 18	at LSU	State Field; Baton Rouge, LA (rivalry)	L 0–41	
November 30	at Mississippi College	State Fairgrounds; Jackson, MS	L 14–36	
*Non-conference game
