= Graham Vowell =

American football player (1895–1963)

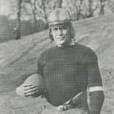
- Vowell c. 1921

Profile
- Position: End/Fullback

Personal information
- Born: February 27, 1895; Martin, Tennessee, U.S.
- Died: November 17, 1963 (aged 68); Tennessee, U.S.
- Listed weight: 184 lb (83 kg)

Career information
- College: Tennessee (1914–1916; 1921)

Awards and highlights
- SIAA championship (1914, 1916); All-Southern (1916); Third-team All-American (1916); Tennessee Sports Hall of Fame (2017)

John Graham Vowell (February 27, 1895 – November 17, 1963) was an American football player for the Tennessee Volunteers, of the University of Tennessee. He was the school's first All-American. Vowell was inducted into the Tennessee Sports Hall of Fame for 2017.

== Early life ==
John Graham was born on February 27, 1895, in Martin, Tennessee, to John A. Vowell and Emma Floyd Wilson.

== University of Tennessee ==
=== 1914 ===
Vowell played mostly at end and was a member of the 1914 SIAA champion Vols; the program's first championship of any kind. He scored three touchdowns in that season's final game against Kentucky.

=== 1916 ===
Vowell about 1916

Vowell scored the winning touchdown in the victory over Vanderbilt in 1916 immediately dubbed the upset of the season. He was selected All-Southern in 1916, a year in which he was captain and helped lead the Volunteers to an 8–0–1 record and a share of the SIAA championship. Walter Camp placed Vowell on his All-America third-team. His older brother Morris Vowell was a tackle on some of the same teams. Graham and his family worked in the lumber business.

=== 1921 ===
Vowell came back in 1921, and was given a gold watch by Knoxville fans.

== Florida ==
He retired to Florida in 1954.
