= Legare Hairston =

American football player (1892–1980)

Lucy Hairston
Profile
- Position: Quarterback

Personal information
- Born: November 19, 1892; Crawford, Mississippi, U.S.
- Died: March 2, 1944 (aged 51); Mobile, Alabama, U.S.
- Listed weight: 175 lb (79 kg)

Career information
- College: Auburn (1913–1916)

Awards and highlights
- SIAA championship (1913, 1914)

Legare "Lucy" Hairston (November 19, 1892 – March 2, 1944) was an American football player for Mike Donahue's Auburn Tigers of Auburn University. One writer claims "Auburn had a lot of great football teams, but there may not have been one greater than the 1913-1914 team." One story of the origin of the school's "War Eagle" started with Hairston, the starting quarterback during the Carlisle–Auburn game in 1914.

In the 1916 game against Georgia, Moon Ducote kicked a 40-yard field goal off of Hairston's football helmet in the fourth quarter and in the mud, which proved the only points in the 3–0 Auburn victory. The maneuver prompted a rule that stated the ball must be kicked directly off the ground.
