= Sanford Field =

Sports venue in Athens, Georgia, US

Coordinates: 33°57.031′N 83°22.622′W

- Interactive map of Sanford Field
- Location: Lumpkin Street; Athens, Georgia 30602
- Owner: University of Georgia
- Operator: University of Georgia
- Surface: grass

Construction
- Opened: 1911; 115 years ago 1929; 97 years ago (football moved to Sanford Stadium)

Tenants
- Georgia Bulldogs (football and baseball)

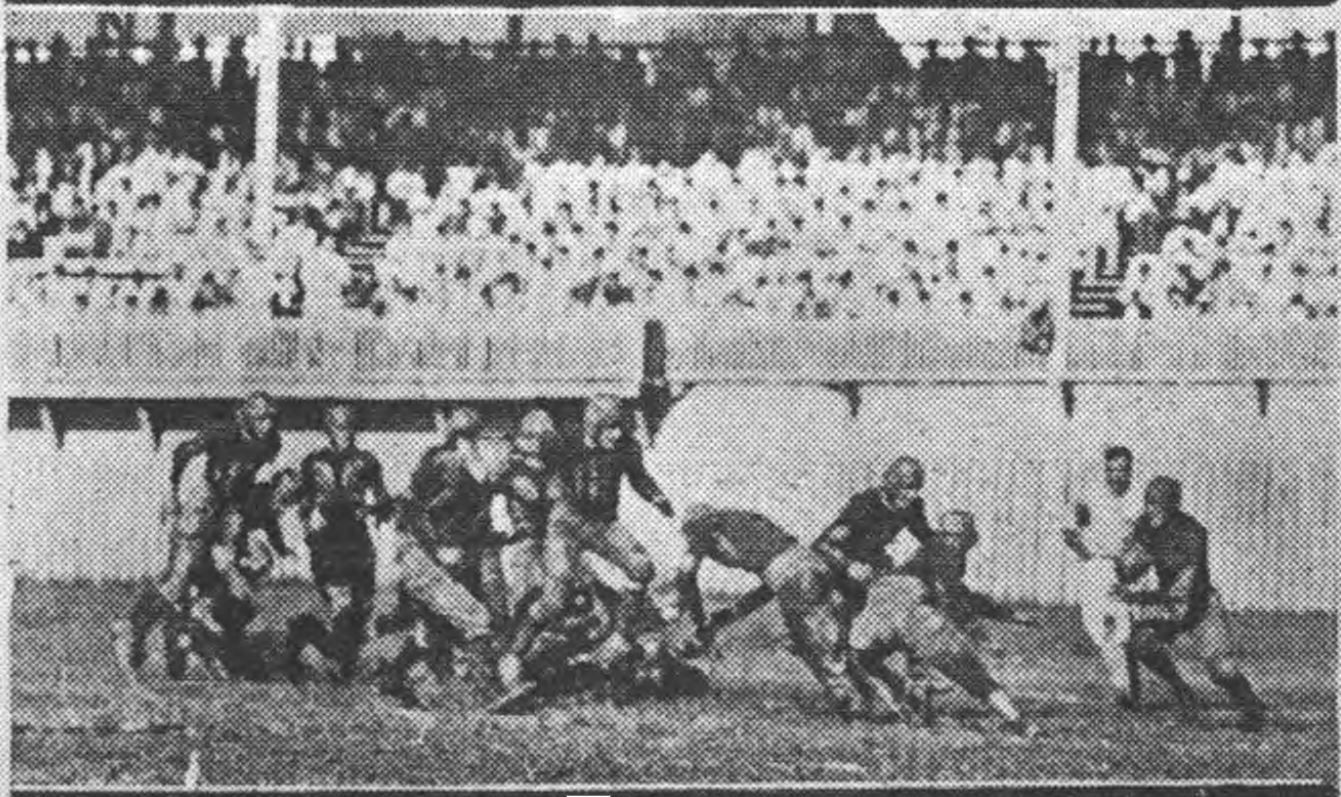
Sanford Field during a 1925 game against the Vanderbilt Commodores

Sanford Field was an on-campus playing venue for football and baseball at the University of Georgia (UGA) in Athens, Georgia. It was built with wooden stands in 1911 and was named after Steadman V. Sanford. As a venue for football, it was replaced in 1929 by Sanford Stadium, which was built nearby.

== Sources ==
- "Herty Field". HMdb.org The Historical Marker Database.
- "Herty Field State Historical Marker". Carl Vinson Institute of Government. Archived from the original on October 10, 2006.
- "Historic Athletic Grounds". HMdb.org The Historical Marker Database.
- "UGA Historic Athletic Grounds Historical Marker". Carl Vinson Institute of Government. Archived from the original on September 20, 2006.
- "Baseball History". georgiadogs.com.
