= Waite Field =

Original playing surface for Tennessee Volunteers football

Wait Field
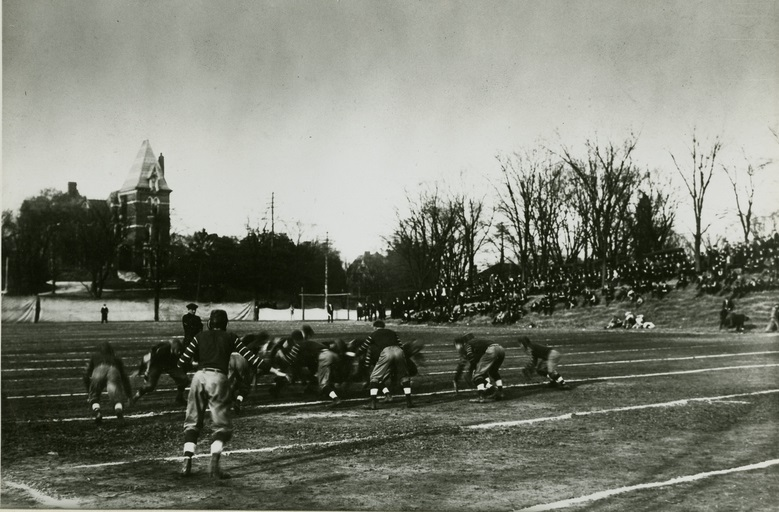
- UT on Wait Field, 1911
- Owner: University of Tennessee

Construction
- Opened: 1908
- Closed: 1921

Wait Field was the second playing surface, replacing Baldwin Park, for Tennessee Volunteers football. It was located at the southeast corner of 15th Street and Cumberland Avenue, currently the site of the Walters Life Science Building. It was also the home venue for Tennessee Volunteers baseball until 1920, when the program moved to Lower Hudson Field.
