= 1916 College Football All-Southern Team =

American all-star college football team

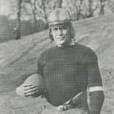
Graham Vowell of Tennessee was the lone unanimous selection of 1916.

The 1916 College Football All-Southern Team consists of American football players selected to the College Football All-Southern Teams selected by various organizations in 1916.

Georgia Tech posted the best SIAA record, and tied for the championship with Tennessee. Graham Vowell, Pup Phillips, and Irby Curry were selected for Walter Camp's third-team All-American. Both Curry and Tommy Spence would die in France serving the United States in the First World War.

== Composite team ==
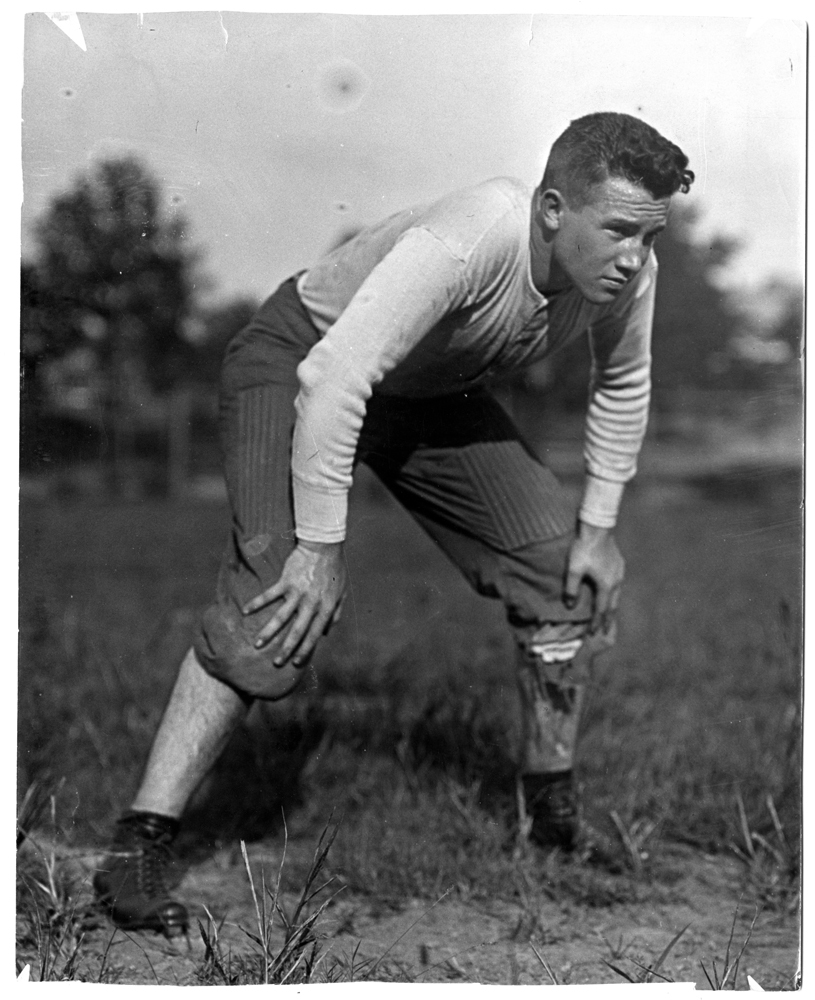
Pup Phillips of Georgia Tech was his school's first center selected All-Southern.

The composite All-Southern team formed by the selection of 4 newspapers included:

- Walker Carpenter, tackle for Georgia Tech, starter for the 1916 team which, as one writer wrote, "seemed to personify Heisman." The season included the 222 to 0 defeat of Cumberland.
- Josh Cody, tackle for Vanderbilt, inducted into the College Football Hall of Fame in 1970, only three-time All-American in Vanderbilt football history. He was selected for the Associated Press Southeast Area All-Time football team 1869-1919 era. Third-team Camp All-American. Later a prominent football coach at many institutions.
- Rabbit Curry, quarterback for Vanderbilt, was selected third-team All-American by Walter Camp. During the First World War, he was killed in aerial combat over France. He was a beloved player of Coach McGugin, described by one writer as "the player who has most appealed to the imagination, admiration, and affection of the entire university community through the years."
- Bob Lang, guard for Georgia Tech, starter in the 222 to 0 win. He was the first guard selected for the Heisman era All-Era Tech football team.
- Chink Lowe, guard and captain-elect for Tennessee. He served in the First World War as a marine and earned the Distinguished Service Cross.
- Pup Phillips, center for Georgia Tech, was selected third-team All-American by Walter Camp. The first Tech center to be selected All-Southern.
- Doc Rodes, halfback for Kentucky, a team which defeated Centre 68–0 and finished the season with an upset – a scoreless tie with SIAA co-champion Tennessee. Kentucky's only loss came against Vanderbilt. Vanderbilt coach Dan McGugin stated "If you would give me Doc Rodes, I would say he was a greater player than Curry."
- Tommy Spence, fullback for Georgia Tech, scored second most behind Strupper in the 222 to 0 win. Spence, like Curry, was also a casualty of the First World War over French skies. He is the namesake of Spence Air Base.
- Everett Strupper, halfback for Georgia Tech, inducted into the College Football Hall of Fame in 1972. He was deaf and scored the most in the 222 to 0 win.
- Graham Vowell, end and captain for Tennessee, the lone unanimous selection. He was also selected third-team All-American by Walter Camp. After football, he worked in the lumber business.

== Composite overview ==
Name	Position	School	First-team selections
Graham Vowell	End	Tennessee	4
Josh Cody	Tackle	Vanderbilt	3
Pup Phillips	Center	Georgia Tech	3
Irby Curry	Quarterback	Vanderbilt	3
Everett Strupper	Halfback	Georgia Tech	3
Tommy Spence	Fullback	Georgia Tech	3
Walker Carpenter	Tackle	Georgia Tech	2
Bob Lang	Guard	Georgia Tech	2
Chink Lowe	Guard	Tennessee	2
Doc Rodes	Halfback	Kentucky	2
Lloyd Wolfe	End	Tennessee	1
Red Jones	End	Auburn	1
Si Bell	End	Georgia Tech	1
Tom Thrash	Tackle	Georgia	1
Ike Rogers	Tackle	Alabama	1
Phillip Cooper	Tackle	LSU	1
Moon Ducote	Guard	Auburn	1
Pryor Williams	Guard	Vanderbilt	1
Charlie Carman	Guard	Vanderbilt	1
Carey Robinson	Center	Auburn	1
Froggie Morrison	Quarterback	Georgia Tech	1
Bill Folger	Halfback	North Carolina	1
Cecil Creen	Halfback	Alabama	1
Red Floyd	Halfback	Vanderbilt	1
Homer Prendergast	Fullback	Auburn	1

== All-Southerns of 1916 ==
=== Ends ===
- Graham Vowell†, Tennessee (C, NTC, DJ, H, MB, BH-1, HS, FB, EC, KS, WGF-1, BP)
- Lloyd Wolfe, Tennessee (C, NTC, BH-2, EC, KS, WGF-2)
- Red Jones, Auburn (C, BH-1)
- Si Bell, Georgia Tech (C, FB)
- Neil Edmond, Sewanee (BH-2, BP)
- Harry E. Clark, Sewanee (WGF-2)

=== Tackles ===
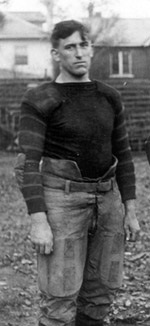
Josh Cody of Vanderbilt.

- Josh Cody, Vanderbilt (College Football Hall of Fame) (C, NTC, DJ [as e], H, MB, BH-1, HS, EC, WGF-1, BP)
- Walker Carpenter, Georgia Tech (C, NTC, DJ, H, MB, BH-1, EC, WGF-1)
- Ike Rogers, Alabama (C, HS [as e], FB)
- Phillip Cooper, LSU (C, DJ, BH-2)
- Tom Thrash, Georgia (C, WGF-2)
- Morris Vowell, Tennessee (EC)
- Tom Lipscomb, Vanderbilt (WGF-2)

=== Guards ===
- Bob Lang, Georgia Tech (C, NTC DJ, H, BH-1, HS, WGF-1)
- William O. "Chink" Lowe, Tennessee (C, BH-2, HS, FB, EC, KS, WGF-2)
- Pryor Williams, Vanderbilt (C, NTC, H, MB, BH-1, BP)
- Moon Ducote, Auburn (C, H [as e], BH-2 [as t], HS [as t], FB, WGF-2, BP [as t])
- Charlie Carman, Vanderbilt (C, BH-2, EC, BP)
- Garmany, Georgia (MB, KS)
- P. C. Hambaugh, Tennessee (WGF-1)

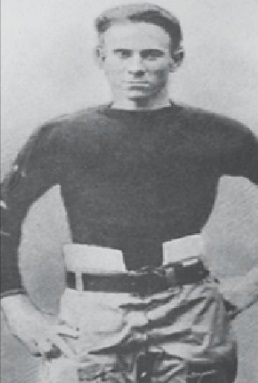
Rabbit Curry of Vanderbilt.

=== Center ===
- Pup Phillips, Georgia Tech (C, NTC, DJ, H, MB, BH-1, HS, EC, KS)
- Carey Robinson, Auburn (C, DJ [as g], MB [as e], BH-2, FB, WGF-1 [as e], BP)
- Kirby Lee Spurlock, Mississippi A&M (WGF-2)

=== Quarterbacks ===
- Rabbit Curry, Vanderbilt (C, NTC, H, MB [as hb], BH-1, HS, FB, EC, KS [as hb], WGF-1, BP)
- Froggie Morrison, Georgia Tech (C, DJ, MB, BH-2)

=== Halfbacks ===
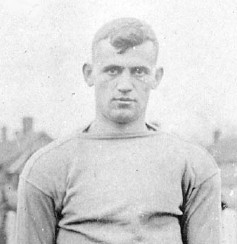
Doc Rodes of Kentucky.

- Everett Strupper, Georgia Tech (College Football Hall of Fame) (C, NTC, DJ, H, MB, BH-1, HS, FB, KS, WGF-1)
- Doc Rodes, Kentucky (C, NTC, H, BH-2, EC, KS [qb], WGF-1)
- Red Floyd, Vanderbilt (C, BH-2, HS, FB)
- Bill Folger, North Carolina (C, DJ)
- Cecil Creen, Alabama (C, EC)
- Eben Wortham, Sewanee (BH-1, WGF-2 [as qb])
- Owen Reynolds, Georgia (BP)
- Homer Prendergast, Auburn (BP)
- Talley Johnston, Georgia Tech (WGF-2)
- H. F. Flannagan, LSU (WGF-2)

=== Fullbacks ===
- Tommy Spence, Georgia Tech (C, NTC, DJ, H, MB, BH-1, HS, FB, WGF-1, BP)
- Homer Prendergast, Auburn, (C)
- Otto Schwill, Mississippi A&M (BH-2, KS, WGF-2)

== Key ==
Bold = Composite selection

* = Consensus All-American

† = Unanimous selection

C = received at least one selection from a composite of 4 newspapers: The Atlanta Constitution, The Birmingham Age-Herald, The Knoxville Journal and Tribune, and The Nashville Tennessean.

NTC = Composite selection of the Nashville Tennessean.

DJ = Dick Jemison of the Atlanta Constitution. He had an "All-Southern" and an "All-SIAA" selection. The only difference was switching Eben Wortham at halfback for Folger.

H = John Heisman, coach at Georgia Institute of Technology.

MB = Morgan Blake of the Atlanta Journal.

BH = Blinkey Horn of the Nashville Tennessean.

HS = Hugh Sparrow, sporting editor for the Birmingham Ledger.

FB = Fred Boedeker in Birmingham Age-Herald

EC = Earl Crew in Knoxville Journal and Tribune

KS = Knoxville Sentinel

WGF = W. G. Foster in the Chattanooga Times

BP = Bob Pigue in Nashville Banner

== See also ==
- 1916 College Football All-America Team
