= Bob Lang =

American football player (1892–1966)

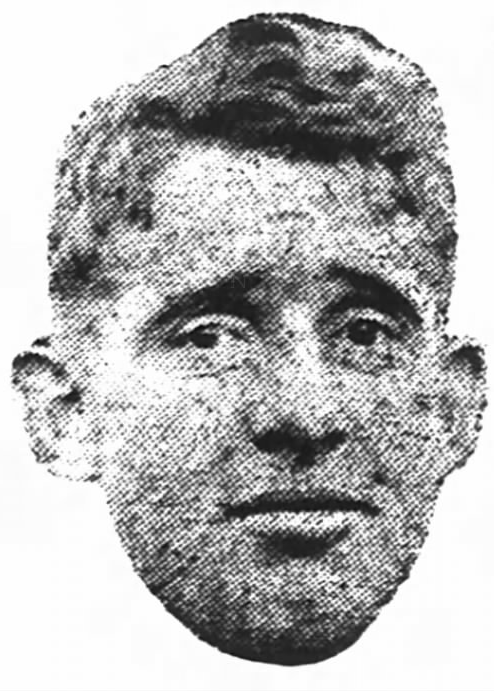

Profile
- Position: Guard

Personal information
- Born: October 1, 1892; Waverly, Georgia, U.S.
- Died: September 19, 1966 (aged 73); Atlanta, Georgia, U.S.
- Listed weight: 192 lb (87 kg)

Career information
- College: Georgia Tech (1913–1916)

Awards and highlights
- National champion (1916); SIAA championship (1916); All-Southern (1915, 1916); Tech All-Era Team (John Heisman Era)

Robert McDonnell "Bob" Lang (October 1, 1892 – September 19, 1966) was a college football player.

== Early life ==
Before attending Tech Lang went to the old South Georgia College in McRae.

== Georgia Tech ==
Lang was a prominent guard for John Heisman's Georgia Tech Golden Tornado of the Georgia Institute of Technology, a member of its "All-Era" team under Heisman.

=== 1915 ===
The school's yearbook the Blue Print of 1915 describes Lang as "one of the biggest men on the varsity, not only in stature but in spirit as well."

=== 1916 ===
Lang was a starter for the 1916 Georgia Tech team which, as one writer wrote, "seemed to personify Heisman." That team defeated Cumberland 222 to 0. He anchored the line along with Walker Carpenter and Pup Phillips.
