= Lloyd Wolfe =

American football and basketball player

Profile
- Position: End

Career information
- College: Tennessee (1914–1916)

Awards and highlights
- All-Southern (1916)

Lloyd Wolfe was a college football and basketball player. Wolfe was a prominent end for the Tennessee Volunteers of the University of Tennessee during the 1914 to 1916. He and Graham Vowell were credited with stopping Vanderbilt's Rabbit Curry in 1916, a season in which he was selected All-Southern.
