= Tommy Spence =

American football player (1896–1918)

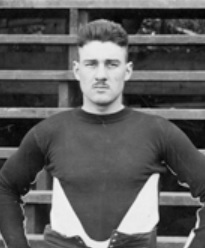

Profile
- Position: Fullback

Personal information
- Born: April 17, 1896; Thomasville, Georgia, U.S.
- Died: November 27, 1918 (aged 22); France
- Listed height: 5 ft 11 in (1.80 m)
- Listed weight: 168 lb (76 kg)

Career information
- College: Georgia Tech (1914–1916)

Awards and highlights
- National champion (1916); SIAA championship (1916); All-Southern (1916); Georgia Tech Athletics Hall of Fame; Tech All-Era Team (John Heisman Era)

Thomas Louis Spence (April 17, 1896 – November 27, 1918) was an American college football player. Spence also played on the baseball, basketball, and track teams.

== Georgia Tech ==
=== Football ===
Spence was a prominent fullback for John Heisman's Georgia Tech Golden Tornado of the Georgia Institute of Technology from 1914 to 1916 . He was posthumously elected to the Georgia Tech Athletics Hall of Fame in 1976.

==== 1915 ====
In 1915, near the end of the LSU game, he returned an interception 85 yards. He made a 40-yard drop kick field goal against North Carolina.

==== 1916 ====
Spence was a starter for the 1916 team which, as one writer wrote, "seemed to personify Heisman." In Georgia Tech's record-setting 222-0 win over Cumberland College in 1916, Spence scored the second-most behind Everett Strupper when he netted five touchdowns. He was selected All-Southern that season. Walter Camp gave him honorable mention.

== World War I ==
Spence was a casualty of the World War I. He is the namesake of Spence Air Base.
