= Kim King (American football) =

American football player (1945–2004)

No. 18
- Position: Quarterback

Personal information
- Born: October 6, 1945
- Died: October 12, 2004 (aged 59)

Career information
- College: Georgia Tech (1965–1967)

D. Kimbrough ("Kim") King (October 6, 1945 – October 12, 2004) was Georgia Tech's starting quarterback for three seasons beginning in 1965. During his career, he led the team in 712 plays, completing 243 passes for 2763 yards and 21 touchdowns while rushing for 506 yards, placing him in Tech's all-time top 10 quarterbacks. Al Ciraldo, Tech's play-by-play announcer, gave Kim the nickname "The Young Left-Hander." He was inducted into the Georgia Tech Sports Hall of Fame in 1978 and the Georgia Sports Hall of Fame in 1996. In 2000, he was named one of Georgia Tech's "50 Greatest Athletes of the 20th Century."

Kim joined Al Ciraldo in the announcer's booth in 1974 as American football color commentator. After Ciraldo's retirement in 1993, Kim continued his duties, eventually being paired with then Tech play-by-play, Wes Durham in 1995. Kim continued broadcasting after his initial diagnosis with leukemia, though he had to miss games at times to travel for medical treatment.

Aside from football, Kim was a businessman with presence in the Atlanta business and political communities. Kim was a developer and founded his own firm, Kim King and Associates. He served as finance chairman for former Gov. Roy Barnes and chairman of the Georgia Public Broadcasting board. He helped raise money for cancer research and the Bobby Dodd Charities Foundation.

Kim lost his extended battle with leukemia on October 12, 2004, six days after his 59th birthday. October 2, 2004, Georgia Tech honored King during the school's game against Miami. Kim and his wife were treated to a lap around the field in the "Ramblin' Wreck" and the school dedicated the Kim King Football Locker Room at Bobby Dodd Stadium.

== See also ==
- List of Georgia Tech Yellow Jackets starting quarterbacks
