= 1916 Georgia Tech Yellow Jackets football team =

American college football season

1916 Georgia Tech Yellow Jackets football
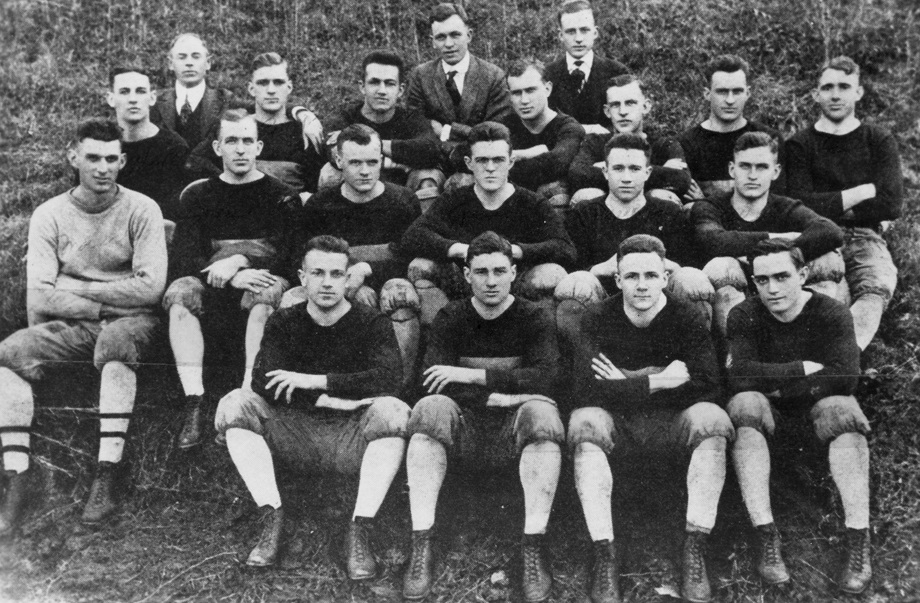

National champion (Billingsley) SIAA co-champion
- Conference: Southern Intercollegiate Athletic Association
- Record: 8–0–1 (5–0 SIAA)
- Head coach: John Heisman (13th season)
- Offensive scheme: Jump shift
- Captain: Talley Johnston
- Home stadium: Grant Field

Uniform
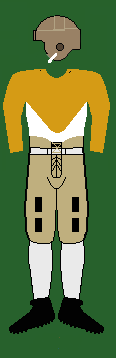

1916 Southern Intercollegiate Athletic Association football standings
| | Conf. | | | | | Overall |
| Team | W | | L | | T | W | | L | | T |
|---|---|---|---|---|---|---|---|---|---|---|
| Georgia Tech + | 5 | – | 0 | – | 0 | 8 | – | 0 | – | 1 |
| Tennessee + | 6 | – | 0 | – | 1 | 8 | – | 0 | – | 1 |
| Vanderbilt | 4 | – | 1 | – | 1 | 7 | – | 1 | – | 1 |
| LSU | 3 | – | 1 | – | 1 | 7 | – | 1 | – | 2 |
| The Citadel | 3 | – | 1 | – | 0 | 6 | – | 1 | – | 1 |
| Tulane | 2 | – | 1 | – | 1 | 4 | – | 3 | – | 1 |
| Kentucky | 2 | – | 1 | – | 2 | 4 | – | 1 | – | 2 |
| Auburn | 6 | – | 2 | – | 0 | 6 | – | 2 | – | 0 |
| Georgia | 5 | – | 2 | – | 0 | 6 | – | 3 | – | 0 |
| Alabama | 4 | – | 3 | – | 0 | 6 | – | 3 | – | 0 |
| Sewanee | 2 | – | 2 | – | 2 | 5 | – | 2 | – | 2 |
| Centre | 1 | – | 1 | – | 1 | 5 | – | 1 | – | 3 |
| Howard (AL) | 1 | – | 1 | – | 0 | 6 | – | 4 | – | 0 |
| Georgetown (KY) | 1 | – | 1 | – | 0 | 2 | – | 1 | – | 0 |
| Mississippi A&M | 3 | – | 4 | – | 0 | 4 | – | 4 | – | 1 |
| Transylvania | 2 | – | 3 | – | 1 | 3 | – | 3 | – | 2 |
| Mississippi College | 2 | – | 3 | – | 0 | 6 | – | 3 | – | 0 |
| Clemson | 2 | – | 4 | – | 0 | 3 | – | 6 | – | 0 |
| South Carolina | 2 | – | 4 | – | 0 | 2 | – | 7 | – | 0 |
| Wofford | 1 | – | 2 | – | 0 | 2 | – | 7 | – | 0 |
| Louisville | 1 | – | 2 | – | 1 | 2 | – | 3 | – | 1 |
| Furman | 1 | – | 3 | – | 0 | 4 | – | 5 | – | 0 |
| Chattanooga | 1 | – | 4 | – | 0 | 3 | – | 5 | – | 0 |
| Florida | 0 | – | 4 | – | 0 | 0 | – | 5 | – | 0 |
| Mercer | 0 | – | 5 | – | 0 | 1 | – | 6 | – | 0 |
| Ole Miss | 0 | – | 6 | – | 0 | 3 | – | 6 | – | 0 |
+ – Conference co-champions

The 1916 Georgia Tech Yellow Jackets football team represented the Georgia Tech Golden Tornado of the Georgia Institute of Technology during the 1916 Southern Intercollegiate Athletic Association football season. Georgia Tech was a member of the Southern Intercollegiate Athletic Association (SIAA). The Tornado was coached by John Heisman in his 13th year as head coach, compiling a record of 8–0–1 (5–0 SIAA) and outscoring their opponents 421 to 20. Georgia Tech played its home games at Grant Field. One writer claimed the 1916 team "seemed to personify Heisman." This was the first team to vault Georgia Tech to national prominence.

The season featured the 222–0 defeat of Cumberland, the largest margin of victory in football history. Tech scored the second-most points in the nation, behind Georgetown. Everett Strupper was third in the nation in scoring, including 16 touchdowns.

Several players received post-season honors. Pup Phillips was the first Tech center selected All-Southern, and was selected third-team All-America by Walter Camp. Along with Phillips and Strupper, tackle Walker Carpenter, guard Bob Lang, and fullback Tommy Spence were also All-Southern.

== Before the season ==
In 1916 football used a one-platoon system, in which players played both offense and defense. Coach John Heisman's backfield used the pre-snap movement of his "jump shift" offense.

The team's captain was halfback Talley Johnston. Leading the team was Tech's first great quarterback Froggie Morrison, and providing the punch at fullback was Tommy Spence.

Star halfback Ev Strupper was partially deaf; because of his deafness, he called the signals instead of the team's quarterback. When "Strupe" tried out for the team, he noticed that the quarterback shouted the signals every time he was to carry the ball. Realizing that the loud signals would be a tip-off to the opposition, Strupper told Heisman: "Coach, those loud signals are absolutely unnecessary. You see when sickness in my kid days brought on this deafness my folks gave me the best instructors obtainable to teach me lip-reading." Heisman recalled how Strupper overcame his deafness: "He couldn't hear anything but a regular shout. But he could read your lips like a flash. No lad that ever stepped on a football field had keener eyes than Everett had. The enemy found this out the minute he began looking for openings through which to run the ball."

Tech rejoined the Southern Intercollegiate Athletic Association. Joe Guyon, a transfer from Carlisle, had to sit out the 1916 season in accordance with conference transfer rules.

== Schedule ==
| Date | Opponent | Site | Result | Attendance |
|---|---|---|---|---|
| September 30 | Mercer | Grant Field; Atlanta, GA | W 61–0 | |
| October 7 | Cumberland (TN)* | Grant Field; Atlanta, GA | W 222–0 | |
| October 14 | Davidson* | Grant Field; Atlanta, GA | W 9–0 | |
| October 21 | North Carolina* | Grant Field; Atlanta, GA | W 10–6 | |
| October 28 | Washington & Lee* | Grant Field; Atlanta, GA | T 7–7 | |
| November 4 | Tulane | Grant Field; Atlanta, GA | W 45–0 | |
| November 11 | Alabama | Grant Field; Atlanta, GA (rivalry) | W 13–0 | |
| November 18 | at Georgia | Sanford Field; Athens, GA (Clean, Old-Fashioned Hate) | W 21–0 | 10,000 |
| November 30 | Auburn | Grant Field; Atlanta, GA (rivalry) | W 33–7 | |
*Non-conference game

== Game summaries ==
=== Mercer ===
Tech opened the season with a 61–0 defeat of Mercer using conventional football. Strupper had a 92-yard punt return for a touchdown.

=== Cumberland (TN) ===
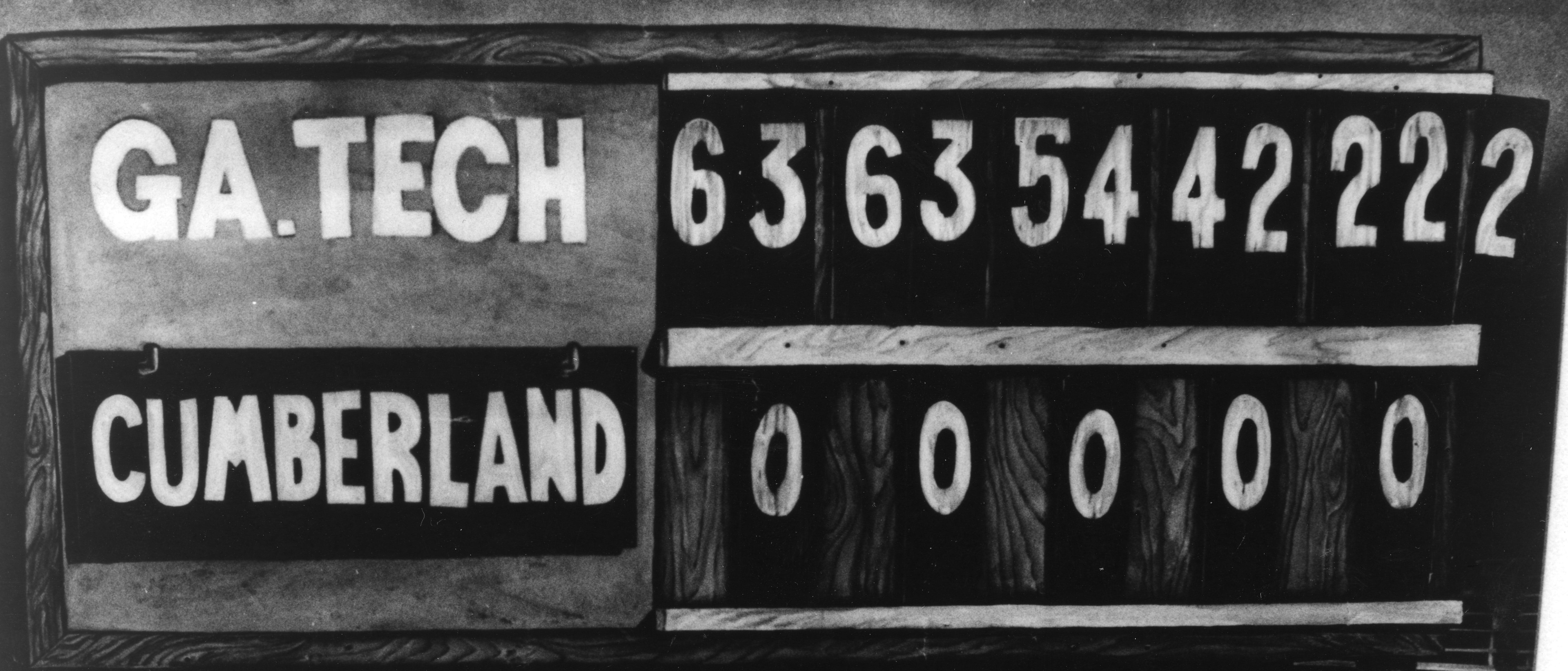

The 222–0 defeat of Cumberland was the largest margin of victory in football history. Cumberland, a Presbyterian school in Lebanon, Tennessee, had discontinued its football program before the season but was not allowed to cancel its game against the Engineers. The fact that Cumberland's baseball team had crushed Georgia Tech earlier that year 22–0 (amidst allegations that Cumberland used professionals as ringers) probably accounted for Georgia Tech coach John Heisman's running up the score on the Bulldogs. (Heisman was also the Engineers' baseball coach.) Another possible reason for Heisman's plan to run up the score was the practice among the sportswriters of the time to rank teams based on how many points they scored. Since this statistic did not account for the strength or weakness of a team's opponent, Heisman disagreed with the amount of weight the writers tended to assign to it, and he may have unleashed his players on Cumberland to make his point.

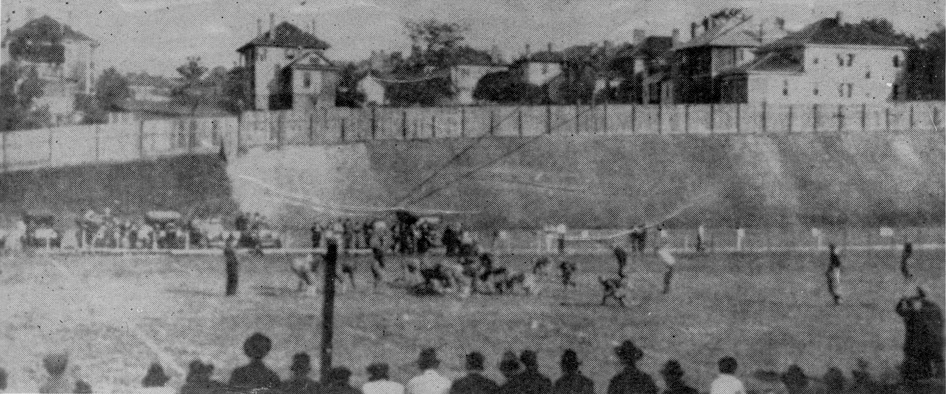
The only known image of the game. Tech at left.

Cumberland received the opening kickoff and failed to make a first down. After a punt, the Engineers scored on their first play. Cumberland then fumbled on their next play from scrimmage, and a Tech player returned the fumble for a touchdown. The Bulldogs fumbled again on their next play, and it took Tech two runs to score its third touchdown. Cumberland lost nine yards on its next possession, then gave up a fourth touchdown on another two-play Tech drive.

With a 42–0 lead midway through the first quarter, Strupper broke clear and could have scored easily, but he intentionally grounded the ball at the one-yard line to allow Georgia Tech tackle J. Cantey Alexander to score the first touchdown of his career. A teammate later recalled the play as follows:

Strupper swapped positions with Alexander ... The team didn't want to make it too easy for Cantey, though. The other boys wouldn't block for him or help in any way. As soon as the ball was snapped, they ran away from the line and out of the play completely. Leaving poor Cantey to go it alone. Finally, on fourth down, a bruised and weary Alexander got the ball across while his teammates howled with laughter.

As a general rule, the only thing necessary for a touchdown was to give a Tech back the ball and holler, 'Here he comes' and 'There he goes.'

— The Atlanta Journal, 1916

The Engineers led 63–0 after the first quarter and 126–0 at halftime. Tech added 54 more points in the third quarter and 42 in the final period. Cumberland's only effective defense was an extra point blocked with a sort of human pyramid.

Sportswriter Grantland Rice wrote, "Cumberland's greatest individual play of the game occurred when fullback Allen circled right end for a 6–yard loss." (Note: Several myths have developed around the game. Some have written that Cumberland did not have a single play that gained yards; in fact, its longest play was a 10-yard pass (on 4th-and-22 or 3rd-and-18). One page on Cumberland's website says Georgia Tech scored on every offensive play, but the play-by-play account of the game refutes this and suggests a more likely scenario: that Georgia Tech scored on every one of its sets of downs. However, neither team made a first down.) At halftime, Heisman reportedly told his players, "You're doing all right, team, we're ahead. But you just can't tell what those Cumberland players have up their sleeves. They may spring a surprise. Be alert, men! Hit 'em clean, but hit 'em hard!" However, even Heisman relented, and shortened the quarters in the second half to 12 minutes each instead of 15.

The starting lineup was: Preas (left end), Bell (left tackle), West (left guard), Phillips (center), Alexander (right guard), Carpenter (right tackle), Puckett (right end), Guill (quarterback), Strupper (left halfback), Shaver (right halfback), and Spence (fullback).

=== Davidson ===
Davidson at Georgia Tech

| Team | 1 | 2 | 3 | 4 | Total |
|---|---|---|---|---|---|
| Davidson | 0 | 0 | 0 | 0 | 0 |
| • Ga. Tech | 0 | 0 | 9 | 0 | 9 |

- Date: October 14
- Location: Grant Field
  Atlanta, GA
- Referee: Lewis (Virginia)

Tech had a tough game with Davidson, winning 9–0. Davidson had one touchdown brought back by penalty. Tech scored with a touchdown, and a safety on a punt fumbled in the end zone.

The starting lineup was: Dunwoody (left end), Bell (left tackle), Lang (left guard), Phillips (center), Fincher (right guard), Carpenter (right tackle), Senter (right end), Morrison (quarterback), Strupper (left halfback), Johnston (right halfback), and Spence (fullback).

=== North Carolina ===
North Carolina at Georgia Tech

| Team | 1 | 2 | 3 | 4 | Total |
|---|---|---|---|---|---|
| UNC | 0 | 0 | 0 | 6 | 6 |
| • Ga. Tech | 10 | 0 | 0 | 0 | 10 |

- Date: October 21
- Location: Grant Field
  Atlanta, GA
- Referee: Ellis (West Point)

Tech beat North Carolina 10–6 in a hard-fought contest. Bill Folger starred for the Tar Heels.

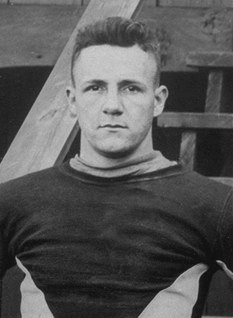
Everett Strupper

After six minutes of play, Everett Strupper caught a punt and ran 55 yards for a touchdown. Five minutes later, Tommy Spence kicked a goal from the 33–yard line. In the fourth quarter, Carolina scored on a forward pass from Folger to Ramsey which set up a touchdown.

Jim Senter broke a bone in his left ankle in the second period, and Spence was threatened with a concussion by game's end.

The starting lineup was: Dunwoody (left end), Mauck (left tackle), Preas (left guard), Phillips (center), Lang (right guard), Carpenter (right tackle), Senter (right end), Morrison (quarterback), Strupper (left halfback), Johnston (right halfback), and Spence (fullback).

=== Washington & Lee ===
Washington & Lee at Georgia Tech

| Team | 1 | 2 | 3 | 4 | Total |
|---|---|---|---|---|---|
| W&L | 7 | 0 | 0 | 0 | 7 |
| Ga. Tech | 7 | 0 | 0 | 0 | 7 |

- Date: October 28
- Location: Grant Field
  Atlanta, GA
- Referee: Paul Magoffin

"In a game filled with thrills", Washington and Lee tied Georgia Tech 7–7 in the season's lone blemish for Tech. Tech had to play without Senter or Spence. All the scoring was done in the first ten minutes. W&L's Hall of Fame captain Harry Young returned a punt to Tech's 37-yard line. After two runs brought the ball to the 30, Adams worked the ball to the score in three plays. Strupper threw a touchdown to Bell for Tech's score. The Generals threatened to score throughout the second period.

The starting lineup was: Dunwoody (left end), Mauck (left tackle), Alexander (left guard), Phillips (center), Lang (right guard), Carpenter (right tackle), Bell (right end), Morrison (quarterback), Strupper (left halfback), Johnston (right halfback), and Glover (fullback).

=== Tulane ===
Tulane at Georgia Tech

| Team | 1 | 2 | 3 | 4 | Total |
|---|---|---|---|---|---|
| Tulane | 0 | 0 | 0 | 0 | 0 |
| • Ga. Tech | 14 | 14 | 0 | 7 | 35 |

- Date: November 4
- Location: Grant Field
  Atlanta, GA
- Referee: James Halligan

Tech easily beat Tulane 45–0, using its superior weight to advantage. Everett Strupper scored first on a 70-yard touchdown. After the half Tech used its substitutes.

The starting lineup was: Dunwoody (left end), Mauck (left tackle), Alexander (left guard), Fincher (center), Lang (right guard), Carpenter (right tackle), Bell (right end), Morrison (quarterback), Strupper (left halfback), Shaver (right halfback), and Guill (fullback).

=== Alabama ===
Alabama at Georgia Tech

| Team | 1 | 2 | 3 | 4 | Total |
|---|---|---|---|---|---|
| Alabama | 0 | 0 | 0 | 0 | 0 |
| • Ga. Tech | 0 | 0 | 7 | 6 | 13 |

- Date: November 11
- Location: Grant Field
  Atlanta, GA

Tech's line held Alabama's Cecil Creen in check throughout as it won 13–0. The Tide gained just 60 yards and two first downs, while Tech gained 20 first downs and 270 yards.

After a competitive three quarters, Alabama's Gage fumbled a pass from center, recovered by Bill Fincher, leading to a Guill score. Later, Glover scored on a short fourth down run.

The starting lineup was: Dunwoody (left end), Alexander (left tackle), Fincher (left guard), Phillips (center), Lang (right guard), Carpenter (right tackle), Bell (right end), Guill (quarterback), Strupper (left halfback), Shaver (right halfback), and Spence (fullback).

=== Georgia ===
Georgia Tech at Georgia

| Team | 1 | 2 | 3 | 4 | Total |
|---|---|---|---|---|---|
| • Ga. Tech | 0 | 7 | 7 | 7 | 21 |
| Georgia | 0 | 0 | 0 | 0 | 0 |

- Date: November 18
- Location: Sanford Field
  Athens, GA
- Game attendance: 10,000
- Referee: Nicholls (Chicago)

Tech easily beat Georgia 21–0 in the season's only road game. After a scoreless first quarter, Johnston ran for 25 yards around right end, and plunges from Spence soon got a touchdown. In the third quarter, Spence scored again. Tech was then aided by a half-the-distance-to-the-goal penalty by Georgia. The drive ended with a 15-yard touchdown run from Strupper. The starting lineup was: Dunwoody (left end), Alexander (left tackle), Lang (left guard), Phillips (center), Fincher (right guard), Carpenter (right tackle), Bell (right end), Morrison (quarterback), Strupper (left halfback), Johnston (right halfback), and Spence (fullback).

=== Auburn ===
Auburn at Georgia Tech

| Team | 1 | 2 | 3 | 4 | Total |
|---|---|---|---|---|---|
| Auburn | 0 | 0 | 7 | 0 | 7 |
| • Ga. Tech | 0 | 20 | 13 | 0 | 33 |

- Date: November 30
- Location: Grant Field
  Atlanta, GA
- Referee: Mike Thompson

Tech overwhelmed rival Auburn 33–7 to clinch a share of the SIAA title. Tech end Dunwoody scored a touchdown when he recovered a fumble and raced 20 yards. Center Pup Phillips also had a score, falling on a punt he blocked. Auburn's star was Moon Ducote.

The starting lineup was: Dunwoody (left end), Alexander (left tackle), Fincher (left guard), Phillips (center), Lang (right guard), Carpenter (right tackle), Bell (right end), Morrison (quarterback), Strupper (left halfback), Johnston (right halfback), and Spence (fullback).

== Postseason ==
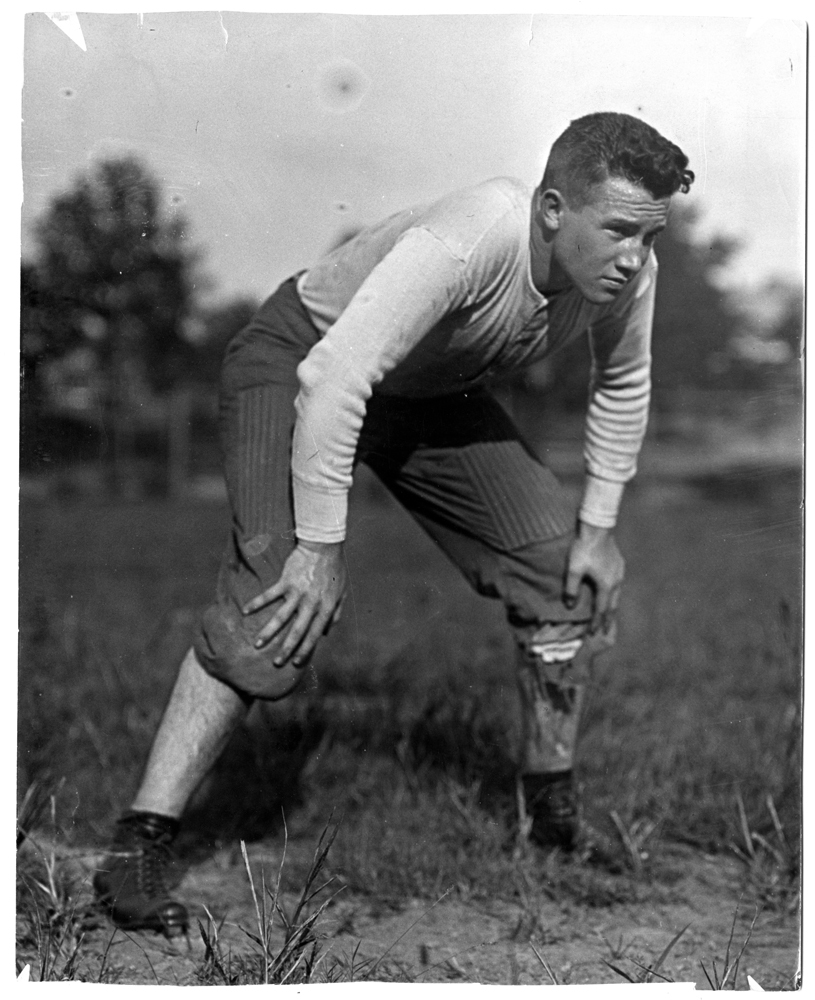
Pup Phillips

Tech scored the second-most points in the nation, behind Georgetown. Everett Strupper was third in the nation in scoring, including 16 touchdowns. The team was retroactively selected as the national champion for 1916 by the Billingsley Report.

=== Awards and honors ===
Center Pup Phillips was selected for Walter Camp's third-team All-America and was the first Tech center selected All-Southern. Tackle Walker Carpenter, guard Bob Lang, fullback Tommy Spence, and halfback Everett Strupper were selected All-Southern along with Phillips. Spence got Camp's honorable mention.

=== First World War ===
Both Morrison and Spence served in the First World War. Spence was a casualty. He is the namesake of Spence Air Base.

== Personnel ==
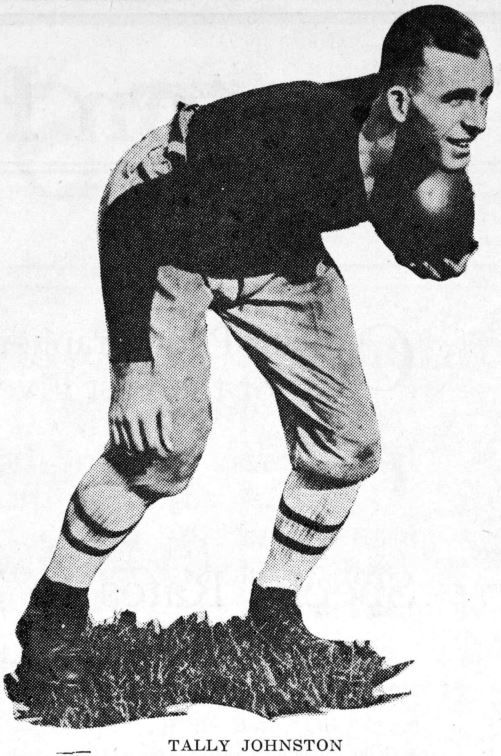
Captain Talley Johnston

=== Depth chart ===
The following chart provides a visual depiction of Tech's lineup during the 1916 season with games started at the position reflected in parentheses. The chart mimics the offense after the jump shift has taken place.

LE
H. R. Dunwoody (7)
Jim Preas (1)
Alton Concord (0)

| LT | LG | C | RG | RT |
|---|---|---|---|---|
| Canty Alexander (3) | Canty Alexander (2) | Pup Phillips (7) | Bob Lang (5) | Walker Carpenter (8) |
| Hugh Mauck (3) | Bill Fincher (2) | Bill Fincher (1) | Bill Fincher (2) | William Thweatt (0) |
| Si Bell (2) | Bob Lang (2) | | Canty Alexander (1) | |
| - | Hip West (1) | | | |
| | Jim Preas (1) | | | |

RE
Si Bell (5)
Jim Senter (2)
Ralph Puckett (1)

QB
Froggie Morrison (6)
Shorty Guill (2)

RHB
Talley Johnston (5)
Theodore Shaver (3)

FB
Tommy Spence (6)
Glover (1)
Shorty Guill (1)

LHB
Everett Strupper (8)
Wally Smith (0)
Jim Fellers (0)
