= Red Jones =

Red Jones may refer to:

- Red Jones (outfielder) (1911–1974), baseball player with the St. Louis Cardinals
- Red Jones (umpire) (1905–1987), American baseball umpire in the American League
- Creadel "Red" Jones (1940–1994), American soul singer and musician
- Red Jones (American football), college football player
