= Doc Rodes =

American athlete (1894–1946)

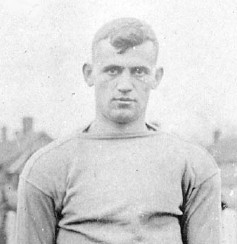
- Rodes c. 1916

Profile
- Positions: Quarterback/Running back Guard (basketball)

Personal information
- Born: October 7, 1894; Lexington, Kentucky, U.S.
- Died: January 28, 1946 (aged 51); Frankfort, Kentucky, U.S.
- Listed weight: 155 lb (70 kg)

Career information
- High school: Lexington
- College: Kentucky (1914–1917)

Awards and highlights
- All-Southern (1916)

William "Doc" Rodes (October 7, 1894 – January 28, 1946) was an American football, basketball, and baseball player for the Kentucky Wildcats of the University of Kentucky. Rodes served in the First World War as a Second Lieutenant. Rodes was a cousin of earlier Kentucky football player William "Red Doc" Rodes, often called William while Black Doc is called Doc. "Doc" also had two brothers play football at Kentucky: J. W. "Boots" Rodes was on the 1904 team that went 9–1. Pete Rodes was a halfback on the 1907 team, and upon entering the Naval Academy was captain of Navy's 1912 football team.

== University of Kentucky ==
After he was graduated from Lexington High School in Lexington, Kentucky, he played on the U.K. freshman football and basketball teams in 1914 and was varsity quarterback on the 1915 and 1916 teams. He also did the kicking.

=== 1916 ===
The 1916 team, coached by John J. Tigert, did very well, defeating Centre 68–0 and finishing the season with an upset – a scoreless tie with SIAA champion Tennessee. An account of the latter reads "Rodes and McIlvain, Kentucky's quarterback and fullback, played a magnificent game and had they received the proper support from their team, would have piled up a large score against Tennessee." He was selected for the All-Southern team this year. Kentucky's only loss was against Vanderbilt, led by Rabbit Curry. Vanderbilt coach Dan McGugin stated "If you would give me Doc Rodes, I would say he was a greater player than Curry."

== Death ==
At the time of his death, Rodes was vice president and treasurer of the Union Transfer and Storage Company and prominently associated with the trucking industry in Kentucky. Rodes sat in the gallery of the House of Representatives in Frankfort, during a heated discussion about increasing the weight and length limits on trucks. Rodes started to suffer from a heart attack, and as he called for help one spectator broke silence with "Doc Rodes is dying up here."
