= Ciraldo =

Ciraldo is a surname. Notable people with the surname include:

- Al Ciraldo (1921–1997), American sportscaster
- Bobby Ciraldo (born 1974), American filmmaker and web-based artist
- Cameron Ciraldo (born 1984), Australian rugby league player and coach

== See also ==
- Giraldo
