= Jim Preas =

American football player and coach (1893–1965)

Biographical details
- Born: June 22, 1893; Johnston City, Tennessee, U.S.
- Died: January 31, 1965 (aged 71); Johnston City, Tennessee, U.S.

Playing career
- 1913–1916: Georgia Tech
- Position: End

Coaching career (HC unless noted)
- 1919–1921: Apprentice

Head coaching record
- Overall: 18–3–1

James Henry Preas (June 22, 1893 – January 31, 1965) was an American college football player and coach. Preas was the first head football coach at The Apprentice School in Newport News, Virginia, serving for three seasons, from 1919 to 1921, and compiling a record of 18–3–1.

Preas played college football at Georgia Tech from 1913 to 1916 under head coach John Heisman. He kicked 18 points after touchdown and scored a touchdown in the legendary 222-0 Tech victory over Cumberland on October 7, 1916. At Georgia Tech, he also lettered in track, baseball, and wrestling.

In 1919, he married Evangeline Horman. Preas died in 1965.
