= Froggie Morrison =

American football player and colonel (1893–1973)

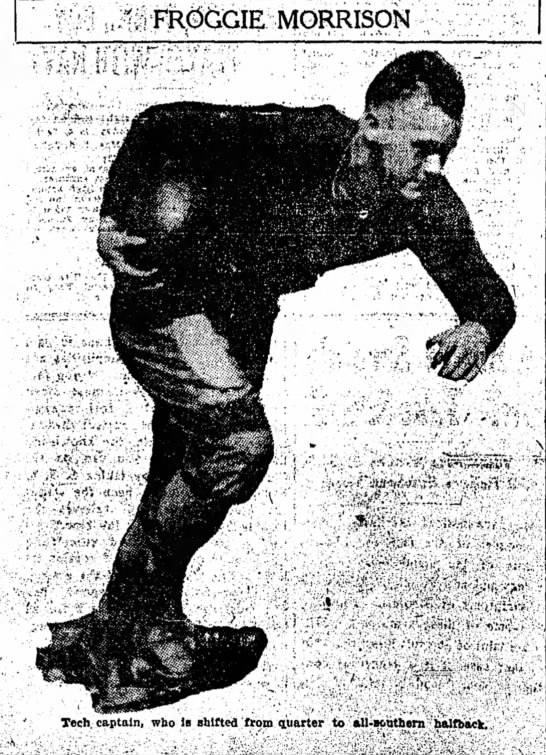

Profile
- Position: Halfback/Quarterback

Personal information
- Born: February 9, 1893; Dade County, Georgia, U.S.
- Died: April 26, 1973 (aged 80); Dade County, Georgia, U.S.

Career information
- High school: Central (Chattanooga)
- College: Georgia Tech (1914–1916)

Douglas Eaton "Froggie" Morrison (February 9, 1893 – April 26, 1973) was an American college football player and colonel. He attended Chattanooga Central High School.

== Georgia Tech ==
Morrison was a prominent running back for John Heisman's Georgia Tech Golden Tornado of the Georgia Institute of Technology. He was captain of the 1915 team, selected All-Southern. He led the team at quarterback for the 222–0 defeat of Cumberland in 1916. Morrison was a catcher on the baseball team. He returned to Tech as an assistant coach in 1933 after serving in World War I and a sixteen-year hiatus from college football.

== Retirement ==
He retired to Trenton, Georgia.

== See also ==
- List of Georgia Tech Yellow Jackets starting quarterbacks
