= Pup Phillips =

American football player and coach (1895–1953)

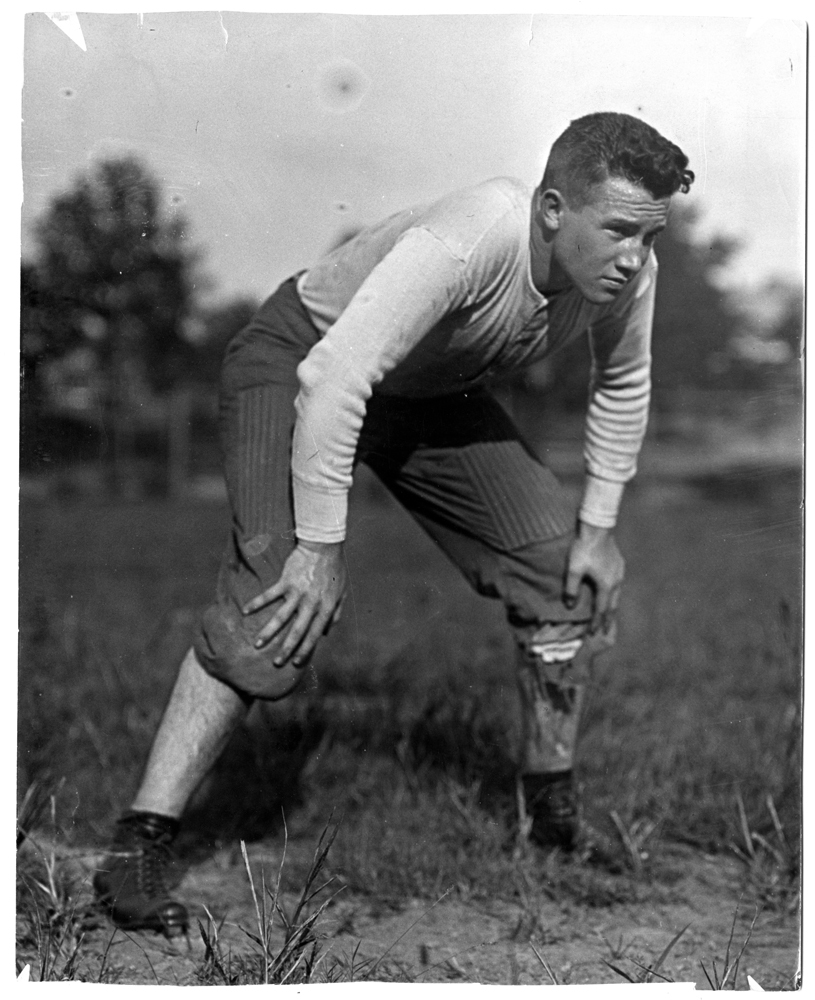
- Phillips c. 1917

Georgia Tech Yellow Jackets
- Position: Center
- Class: 1919

Personal information
- Born: September 24, 1895; Carnesville, Georgia, U.S.
- Died: May 1, 1953 (aged 57); Atlanta, Georgia, U.S.
- Listed height: 6 ft 0 in (1.83 m)
- Listed weight: 182 lb (83 kg)

Career information
- College: Georgia Tech (1916–1917; 1919)

Awards and highlights
- National champion (1917); SIAA championship (1916, 1917); All-Southern (1916, 1917, 1919); All-American (1917, 1919); Third-team All-American (1916); Tech All-Era Team (John Heisman Era); Hal Nowell trophy

George Marshall "Pup" Phillips (September 24, 1895 – May 1, 1953) was an American football player and coach.

== Early life ==
Phillips was born on September 24, 1895, in Carnesville, Georgia, to George Sullivan Phillips and Elizabeth Witaker Hunsinger.

== Georgia Tech ==
Phillips was a prominent center for John Heisman's Georgia Tech Golden Tornado of the Georgia School of Technology. He was thrice selected All-Southern.

=== 1916 ===
He was a starter for the 1916 Georgia Tech team which, as one writer wrote, "seemed to personify Heisman." The season included the 222 to 0 rout of Cumberland. Phillips that year was the first Tech center elected All-Southern.

=== 1917 ===
He was a member of Tech's first national championship team in 1917 which outscored opponents 491 to 17. Phillips received the Hal Nowell trophy for the most efficient play during the season. He left to join the American effort in the First World War as a marine just a week after celebrating the national championship.

=== 1919 ===
Phillips played again in 1919, when he was captain. Dick Jemison selected Phillips first-team All-American.

== Coaching career ==
Phillips coached the University School for Boys (Stone Mountain). His quarterback was Johnny Broadnax.
