= Homer Prendergast =

American football player and coach (1893–1975)

Profile
- Positions: Halfback, quarterback

Personal information
- Born: April 20, 1893; Marshall, Texas, U.S.
- Died: June 3, 1975 (aged 82); Shreveport, Louisiana, U.S.

Career information
- College: Auburn (1913–1916)

Awards and highlights
- SIAA championship (1913, 1914); All-Southern (1915, 1916)

Finis Homer "Boosky" Prendergast Jr. (April 20, 1893 – June 3, 1975) was an American college football player and high school football coach.

== Playing career ==
=== Auburn University ===
Prendergast was a prominent running back for Mike Donahue's Auburn Tigers football team of Auburn University from 1913 to 1916. He also punted.

1915
He was selected All-Southern in 1915.

1916
Prendergast was selected All-Southern again in 1916.

== Coaching career ==
In 1923, Prendergast was hired as backfield and ends coach for the football team at the College of Marshall—now known as East Texas Baptist University—in Marshall, Texas.

In 1926, Prendergast was hired as an athletic coach and English teacher at Shreveport High School in Shreveport, Louisiana. After coaching at Shreveport's C. E. Byrd High School, Prendergast became head coach at Fair Park High School, also in Shreveport, in 1935. He remained at Fair Park until his retirement from coaching in 1958. In his 23 years as Fair Park's head football coach, Prendergast compiled a 154–78–13 (.655) record and lead his team to a Louisiana High School Athletic Association (LHSAA) state championship in 1952.

== Death ==
Prendergast died on June 3, 1975, at Virginia Hall Nursing Home in Shreveport.
