= Toppy Vann =

American football quarterback

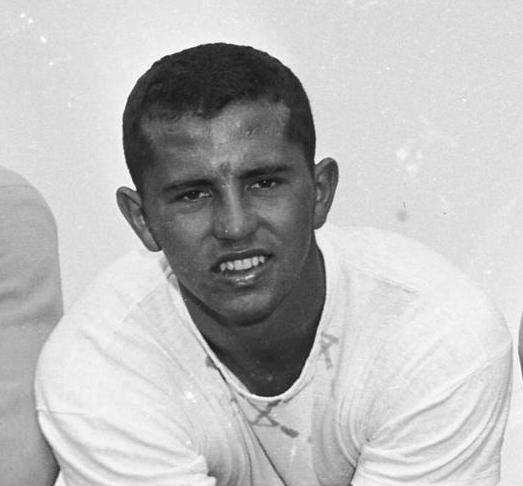
- Vann in 1957

No. 99
- Position: Quarterback

Personal information
- Born: 1936 (age 89–90)
- Listed height: 5 ft 11 in (1.80 m)
- Listed weight: 190 lb (86 kg)

Career information
- High school: Rossville (Georgia)
- College: Georgia Tech

Career history
- 1957: BC Lions

Career WIFU statistics
- Passing comp: 18
- Passing att: 33
- Passing yards: 254
- Passing TDs: 3

Ronald T. "Toppy" Vann (born 1936) is an American former professional football quarterback who played one season with the BC Lions of the Western Interprovincial Football Union (WIFU). He played college football at Georgia Tech.

== Early life ==
Ronald T. Vann was born in 1936. He attended Rossville High School in Rossville, Georgia.

== College career ==
Vann played college football for the Georgia Tech Yellow Jackets of the Georgia Institute of Technology. He was on the freshman team in 1953 and the main roster from 1954 to 1956. He was a letterman during the 1955 and 1956 seasons. Vann completed five of five passes for 34 yards in 1954. As a junior in 1955, he split time with Wade Mitchell. The Associated Press noted that Vann "relieves regular Wade Mitchell much of the time when Tech goes to the air." Vann led the team in passing yards during the 1955 season, completing 21 of 36 passes (58.3%) for 270 yards, one touchdown, and three touchdowns while also rushing for 111 yards and six touchdowns. As a senior in 1956, he shared the quarterbacking duties with Mitchell again, completing 34 of 65 passes (52.3%) for 446 yards, six touchdowns, and four interceptions while running for 97 yards and five touchdowns. Vann's six passing touchdowns were tied for the most in the Southeastern Conference (SEC) that year. Mitchell also played on defense but Vann did not. The Atlanta Journal noted that Vann was "one of the best offensive T-formation operators in the SEC." He majored in industrial engineering at Georgia Tech.

== Professional career ==
In May 1957, Vann signed a one-year contract worth approximately $10,000 with the BC Lions of the Western Interprovincial Football Union. He played in five games, starting three, for the Lions during the 1957 season, completing 18 of 33 passes (54.5%) for 254 yards, three touchdowns, and three interceptions while also scoring one rushing touchdown. He suffered season-ending torn knee ligaments early in the year. Vann later had surgery to repair his knee. In April 1958, it was reported that his knee had fully healed. However on May 20, 1958, he announced his retirement, with the Canadian Press stating that Vann "decided not to gamble" with his knee.

== See also ==
- List of Georgia Tech Yellow Jackets starting quarterbacks
