= Bill Folger =

American football player

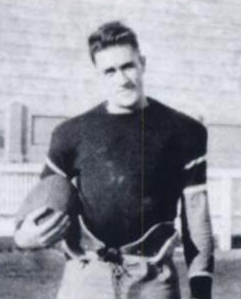

Profile
- Position: Halfback/Fullback

Career information
- College: North Carolina (1916)

Awards and highlights
- All-Southern (1916)

Augustine William Folger was an American college football player.

== University of North Carolina ==
Folger was a prominent running back for the North Carolina Tar Heels football of the University of North Carolina. One Dr. R. B. Lawson picked Folger as a second-team fullback on his all-time North Carolina football team.

=== 1916 ===
Folger starred in the game against conference champion Georgia Tech. Davidson would have defeated North Carolina had it not been for a 61-yard touchdown run from Folger. On November 13, he completed one of the most significant plays in the early history of the Carolina football program, a 52-yard touchdown run in the third quarter against Virginia. He was taken out in the fourth quarter when he showed signs of overwork. It was the first defeat of Virginia for the Tar Heels since 1905, and its first touchdown against its rival since 1913. He was selected All-Southern. Folger was elected captain for 1917. Due to the First World War, the school had only no varsity football that year.

== Thomas Wolfe ==
He briefly shared a flat with author Thomas Wolfe in New York in 1923, who based the character of Jim Randolph in The Web and the Rock on Folger.

== See also ==
- South's Oldest Rivalry
