= Ike Rogers =

American football player

Profile
- Position: Tackle

Personal information
- Born: Vina, Alabama, U.S.
- Listed weight: 185 lb (84 kg)

Career information
- College: Florence State Normal School; Alabama (1916–1917; 1919)

Awards and highlights
- All-Southern (1916, 1919)

Isaac J. "Ike" Rogers was a college football player.

== Early life ==
Rogers attended the Florence State Normal School in Florence, Alabama.

== University of Alabama ==
Rogers was a prominent tackle for the Alabama Crimson Tide of the University of Alabama, He was a member of the Sigma Nu fraternity.

=== 1919 ===
He was captain of the 1919 Alabama team that lost just one game. Rogers had been previously elected captain, but had to serve in the First World War. He was twice selected All-Southern. In his last game, a 14–6 win over Mississippi A & M, he scored a touchdown on a punt he blocked.
