= Cecil Creen =

American football player

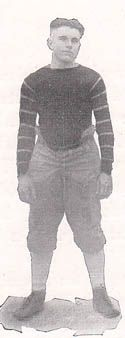

Profile
- Position: Quarterback

Personal information
- Born: c. 1897; Anniston, Alabama, U.S.
- Died: February 20, 1934; Anniston, Alabama, U.S.

Career information
- College: Alabama (1916)

Awards and highlights
- All-Southern (1916); All-America Honorable Mention

Cecil Lee Creen (c. 1897 – February 20, 1934) was a college football player.

== University of Alabama ==
Creen was a prominent quarterback for the Alabama Crimson Tide of the University of Alabama.

=== 1916 ===
In an 80 to 0 win over Southern University in 1916, Goree Johnson and Cecil Creen each scored four touchdowns. The next week, Creen ran in the touchdown to defeat Mississippi College 7 to 6. For the game against Ole Miss, Alabama's 1916 season recap reads "Alabama defeated the University of Mississippi at Tuscaloosa by the score of 27 to 0 with Creen again being the star on the offense." He was selected All-Southern, and was given honorable mention from Walter Camp.

== Washington & Lee ==
He transferred to Washington & Lee.
