= Red Jones (American football) =

American football player

Profile
- Position: End

Career information
- College: Auburn (1915–1916)

Awards and highlights
- All-Southern (1916)

Charles A. "Red" Jones was a college football player. A prominent end for coach Mike Donahue's Auburn Tigers, he was selected All-Southern in 1916.
