= Irby Curry =

American football player and WW1 pilot

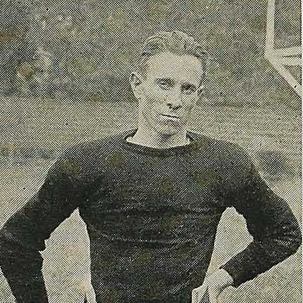

Profile
- Position: Quarterback

Personal information
- Born: August 4, 1894; Marlin, Texas, U.S.
- Died: August 10, 1918 (aged 24); Perles, Aisne, France
- Listed weight: 137 lb (62 kg)

Career information
- High school: Marlin
- College: Vanderbilt (1914–1916)

Awards and highlights
- SIAA championship (1915); All-Southern (1914, 1915, 1916); Outing Roll of Honor (1914); Third-team All-American (1916)

Irby Rice "Rabbit" Curry (August 4, 1894 – August 10, 1918) was an American football quarterback for Vanderbilt University from 1914 to 1916. He was selected as a first-team All-Southern player in 1915 and 1916 and a third-team All-American in 1916. In August 1918, while serving as a pilot in the 95th Aero Squadron during World War I, he was killed in aerial combat over France. He was described as "the player who has most appealed to the imagination, admiration, and affection of the entire university community through the years."

== Early life ==
Curry was born on August 4, 1894, in Marlin, Texas, to his parents, Oscar E. Curry (1869–1964) and Emma C. (Fannin) Curry (1872–1963). He attended Marlin High School, where he was a stand-out athlete. In 1912, he was the Texas state champion in the pole vault as a junior with a then-record 10 ft 4 in (3.15 m), and in 1913, he was on the Texas state champion mile-relay team with a then-state record 3:49.

== Vanderbilt ==
After graduating from high school, Curry enrolled at Vanderbilt University where he became the quarterback for the school's football team from 1914 to 1916. He was nominated though not selected for an Associated Press All-Time Southeast 1869–1919 era team. Curry weighed only 130 pounds while playing football for Vanderbilt. He was an elusive runner who reportedly "only needed the suspicion of an opening to wriggle through, and once into the open — zip, flash and a touchdown." Curry also played center field on the baseball team and would pole vault, hurdle, and broad jump for the track team. He was a member of the Delta Tau Delta fraternity and the Delta Sigma Delta medical fraternity.

=== 1915 football team ===
As a junior in 1915, Curry led Vanderbilt to a record-setting season in which they scored 514 points in 510 minutes of actual playing time, "ranking them as a legitimate 'point-a-minute' team." They finished 9–1–0. Following an 85-yard touchdown run in Vanderbilt's one loss, The Washington Post wrote that the "little Curry" was "quick as a flash" and "Vanderbilt's bright star."

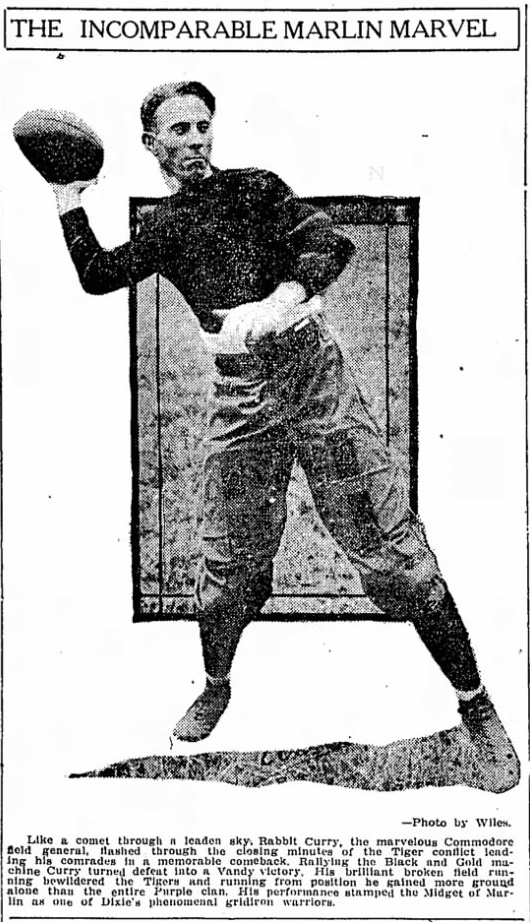
Curry throwing a forward pass.

In Vanderbilt's 1915 game against Mississippi, the team traveled by train from Nashville to Memphis, Tennessee, where the game was to be played. The players complained about the lack of food on the train, and the team's manager picked three or four hatfuls of green apples from an orchard near the tracks. The manager later recalled that Curry ate many of the green apples and proceeded to score six touchdowns and kick eight goals after touchdown against Ole Miss. The final score was 91–0.

Vanderbilt's final game of the 1915 season was a Thanksgiving Day game against Sewanee. Vanderbilt won 27–3, as Curry scored two fourth-quarter touchdowns and kicked three goals from touchdown, leading The Atlanta Constitution to write:

"Curry was the star of the game, and proved a marvel at advancing the ball. Near the end of the last quarter, when Clark punted, Curry received the ball on his own 20-yard line and ran 80 yards for a touchdown. Another time he ran 34 yards for a touchdown. Time after time Curry made 10, 15 and 20 yard gains, and his work was largely responsible for Vanderbilt's victory."

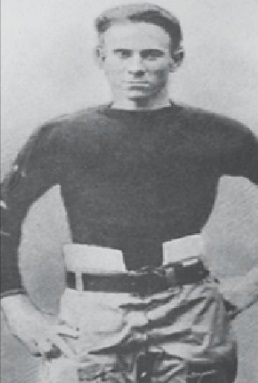

Sewanee coach Harris Cope said "I think Curry is one of the greatest players I have ever seen." At the end of the 1915 season, Curry was selected as a first-team All-Southern back by all ten Southern sporting writers in a composite poll published by The Atlanta Constitution.

=== 1916 football team ===
In December 1915, Curry's teammates elected him captain of the 1916 Vanderbilt football team. During the 1916 football season, Curry led Vanderbilt to a 7–1–1 record. In October 1916, Curry led Vanderbilt to its first-ever victory over Virginia, and the Associated Press reported that "Virginia was unable to stop the fleet-footed 'Rabbit' Curry", whose "spectacular open field running was the feature of the game." Curry had runs of 61, 40 and 11 yards against Virginia, scored a touchdown and kicked three goals from touchdown.

At the end of the 1916 season, Curry was selected as an All-Southern quarterback and as a third-team All-American by Walter Camp for Collier's Weekly. Curry was honored as Bachelor of Ugliness.

== World War I ==
Curry would have graduated with Vanderbilt's Class of 1918, but he enlisted in the military when the United States entered World War I in 1917. Curry joined the 95th Aero Squadron in the village of Saints as a pilot, attaining the rank of First Lieutenant. On August 10, 1918, while on protection patrol, he was killed in an aerial combat over Perles, France.

Lieutenant Hunnicutt, who flew with Rabbit, described First Lieutenant Curry's death in a letter to his family:

Irby and a classmate from Vanderbilt were in the same aero squadron. At Chateau Thierry their squad engaged Richthofen's circus (Germany's greatest aero squad). Irby was wounded and went into a tight spiral and to land. He never gained strength to come out of the spiral and crashed to the earth. His classmate downed a plane and landed to get the German, but landed on German soil and was captured. Nine out of eighteen of Irby's squad were killed, The Germans suffered greater than the Americans.

After learning about the death of Curry, McGugin wired this telegram to The Tennessean:

During the four years of my intimate association with Irby Curry, I never heard him utter a word his mother might not hear and approve. A game sportsman and scholar, truly he was gentle as a dove. He had a lion's heart, and now a hero's death. Poor Little Rabbit! How he pulls at the heart-strings of all of us who knew him and therefore honored and loved him tenderly.

Curry was survived by his wife, Dimple Jenna Rush. Curry's remains were initially buried at Atz, France, but were subsequently removed to a military cemetery at Château-Thierry. In August 1921, Curry's remains were removed and reburied in a cemetery in his hometown of Marlin, Texas. Floral tributes, telegrams and tributes from hundreds of Vanderbilt alumni, athletes and officials were sent to the funeral.

== Posthumous honors ==
For many years after Curry's death, Vanderbilt's football coach Dan McGugin had three photographs displayed over his desk. The three pictures were of Abraham Lincoln, Robert E. Lee and Curry. When McGugin took the Vanderbilt team on the road against Texas in 1921, he took the team to Curry's grave in Marlin, Texas before the game. Before the team ran onto the field against Texas, McGugin told them: "They are betting Texas will beat you 20 to 0, they say you are a bunch of cowards. 'Rabbit' Curry, whose father is sitting here with you, is looking down on you from his Eternal Home." Vanderbilt won the game 20–0.

In 1930, a newspaper account reported on the special place that Curry maintained in McGugin's memory:

Uncle Dan may have had better players than Curry, but the Rabbit somehow wound himself more closely into the affections of the old master than any other Black and Gold athlete. It was one of those reciprocal admirations of a big man for a little man. Dan, husky old-time guard of a generation ago, marveled at the ball-carrying ability of the 130-pound Curry, and Curry had nothing but worship for the famous coach.

In 1922, after Vanderbilt moved into its new football stadium Dudley Field, now known as Vanderbilt Stadium, the old football ground at the corner of West End Avenue and 21st Avenue South in Nashville (Old Dudley Field), was renamed Curry Field in honor of Curry. An open space called "Curry Field" still exists on the site on the Vanderbilt University campus.

Selected to the Tennessee Sports Hall of Fame in 1966. Selected to the Vanderbilt Athletic Hall of Fame on December 17th, 2025.
