= Al Ciraldo =

American sportscaster (1921–1997)

- Born: Alfred Joseph Ciraldo; September 2, 1921; Akron, Ohio, U.S.
- Died: November 7, 1997 (aged 76); Atlanta, Georgia, U.S.
- Occupation: Sportscaster
- Known for: Longtime Georgia Tech Yellow Jackets football and basketball announcer

Alfred Joseph Ciraldo (September 2, 1921 – November 7, 1997) was an American sportscaster best known for his work as the play-by-play announcer for the Georgia Tech Yellow Jackets basketball and football teams.

== Career ==
Ciraldo was a 1948 graduate of the University of Florida with a degree in Broadcast Journalism. Following his graduation, Ciraldo moved to Atlanta and did play-by-play work for the Georgia basketball team. He joined the staff at WGST radio in Atlanta and broadcast his first Georgia Tech football game in 1954, against Tulane. Ciraldo's first Tech basketball game was against Sewanee that same year. Over the next 38 seasons, he called 416 football and 1,030 basketball games for the Rambling Wreck.

In April 1985, when Georgia Tech switched coverage of its football games from WGST to WCNN, Ciraldo was removed as football announcer, allegedly at the behest of the Institute, but he was quickly hired by WCNN and reinstated as broadcaster amid a demonstration of public support.

Ciraldo served as a color analyst in football to Jack Hurst in the late 1950s and 1960s, then took over as lead broadcaster when Hurst left that post. Ciraldo is often remembered for the phrase "Toe meets leather", with which he led off every football game. Assisting Ciraldo on football broadcasts from 1974 to 2003 was former Tech quarterback Kim King, whom Ciraldo introduced every week as "the young left-hander from Atlanta’s own Brown High School". King's book, "Tales from the Georgia Tech Sideline", has a collection of anecdotes and stories about Ciraldo.

It was in basketball, however, that Ciraldo most notably left his mark. As Tech basketball reached national prominence in the mid 1980s under Bobby Cremins, Ciraldo – splitting play-by-play and analyst duties with Brad Nessler – came to the attention of a new generation of sports fans in the southeast. Ciraldo popularized a term that Nessler coined – "Thriller Dome" – to describe the Tech's home court, Alexander Memorial Coliseum, which was the site of many close games in Tech's early ACC years. He died in 1997 in Atlanta.

=== Style ===
Ciraldo was an early practitioner of a style of basketball broadcasting that described the constant movement of the ball on the floor, an approach that enabled his listeners to virtually see the game in progress. In the prime of his career, his rapid speech pattern made Tech fans feel they were actually at the game, and after the advent of portable radios it was not unusual to see spectators at the Coliseum listening to Ciraldo explain what they were looking at on the floor in front of them. Recognition of opposing players and a flow of information offered Tech fans detail and updating of the time and score. Ciraldo also understood many subtleties of the sport. He consistently reported which defenses the two teams were using and was quick to note any changes in them. He also identified individual defensive battles and was quick to praise effort in that regard. (“Bruce Dalrymple, one of the best defenders ever to wear the white and gold. When he guards players, they disappear.”)

=== Legacy ===
Ciraldo's baritone voice and many signature phrases were quite memorable. He often described free throws that hung on the rim before falling in as having “a lot of iron, but good” (pronounced, staccato style, as ‘gut’) or by saying “rolls around” – dramatic pause – “and in.” Close games were "barnburners", as in "We got a real barnburner here tonight." He popularized the use of the terms “snowbird” and “bunny” for lay-ups in the 1950s and 60s, though many of those fans at the games with radios were surprised to see that some shots so described were heavily contested by defenders and anything but easy. A ballcarrier that straddled the sideline during a run would "tight rope the sideline". A sellout crowd before game time was described as "over Tech's capacity crowd filing through the turnstiles".

Those who heard Ciraldo only in his final few years of announcing basketball – when age had slowed him a bit even as the game itself sped up – may not have fully appreciated what he brought to a pre-video era. Georgia Tech memorialized his contributions both by 'retiring' his microphone and by inducting him into the Institute's Hall of Fame in 1986. A banner with Ciraldo's picture hangs high over the Coliseum court alongside a number of the players he so memorably reported on. In 2010, Ciraldo was inducted into the Georgia Sports Hall of Fame.
