= 1916 Cumberland vs. Georgia Tech football game =

College football game regarded as the most lopsided game in American Football

- Most lopsided score in the history of college football
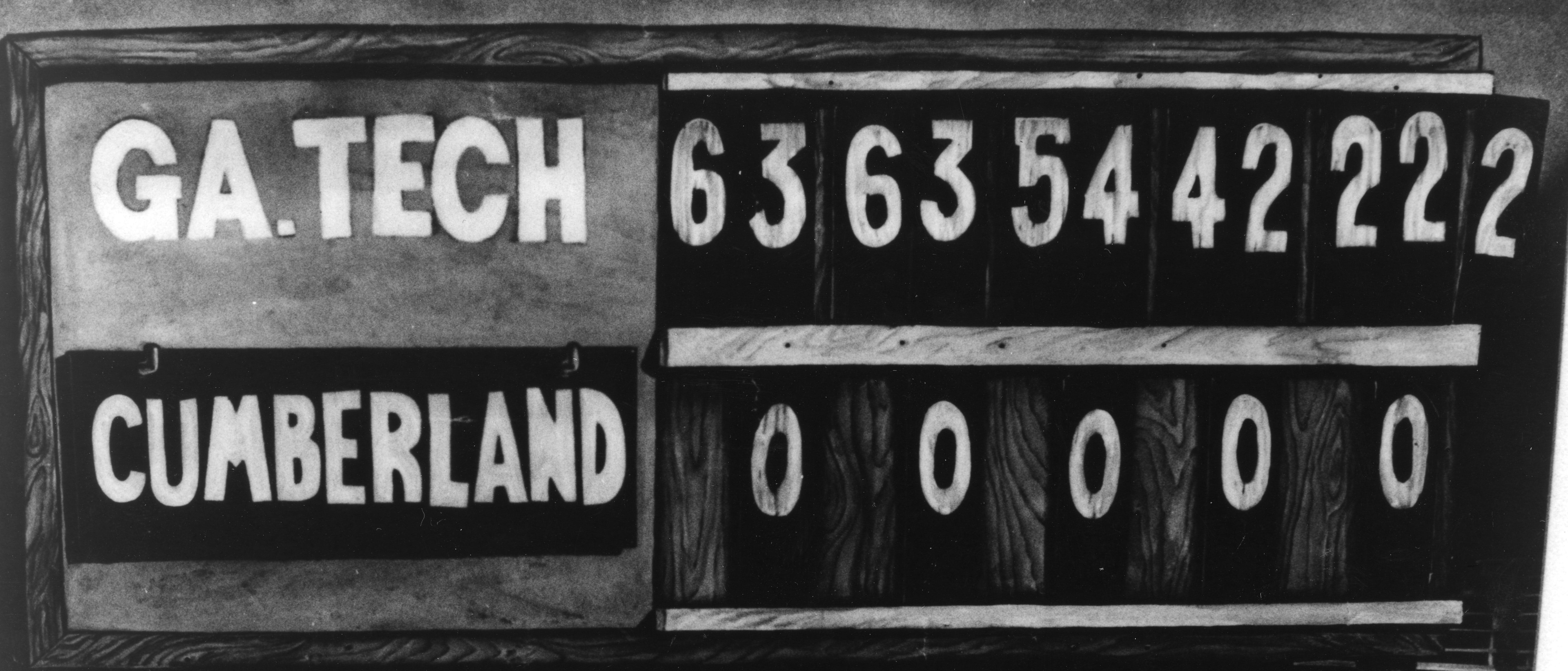
- The scoreboard at the end of the match
| Cumberland Bulldogs | Georgia Tech Yellow Jackets |
| (0–1) | (2–0) |
| 0 | 222 |
| Head coach: George E. Allen | Head coach: John Heisman |
| | 1 | 2 | 3 | 4 | Total |
|---|---|---|---|---|---|
| Cumberland | 0 | 0 | 0 | 0 | 0 |
| Georgia Tech | 63 | 63 | 54 | 42 | 222 |
- Date: October 7, 1916
- Season: 1916
- Stadium: Grant Field
- Location: Atlanta

The 1916 Cumberland vs. Georgia Tech football game was played on October 7, 1916, between the Cumberland College Bulldogs and the Georgia Tech Yellow Jackets on the Yellow Jackets' home field of Grant Field in Atlanta. Georgia Tech defeated the Bulldogs 222–0 for the highest and most one-sided score in the history of college football.

Cumberland had disbanded its football program the previous year but was still obligated to play this game against Georgia Tech. The Yellow Jackets' head coach, John Heisman, had been the coach of Georgia Tech's baseball team when it was defeated 22–0 by the Bulldogs earlier in 1916, and was looking to avenge that game. Heisman insisted that the Bulldogs fulfill their obligations to play the game and threatened legal action if Cumberland backed out. Cumberland tasked George E. Allen, its baseball captain, to assemble a football team for the game; he recruited his fraternity brothers and students from Cumberland's law school to play in Atlanta.

Cumberland failed to achieve a single first down in the entirety of the match. The game's infamous score can be partially attributed to 97 percent of the game's plays occurring in Cumberland territory, with 64 of those plays occurring in its red zone. Georgia Tech, instigated by Heisman, scored on every first down it gained. The imbalance of the teams was so severe that the final two quarters were shortened from their customary 15 minutes to 12 minutes.

This would be the last matchup of any sport between the two schools; Cumberland deemphasized athletics in favor of academic pursuits, while Georgia Tech has continued to compete at the highest level of college sports. Current National Collegiate Athletic Association (NCAA) rules preclude a rematch of this game. In modern times, it is generally seen as risky to player health and unsportsmanlike to deliberately run up the score to such high numbers, meaning that college football games of 100 points or more have been infrequent since the 1940s.

== Background ==
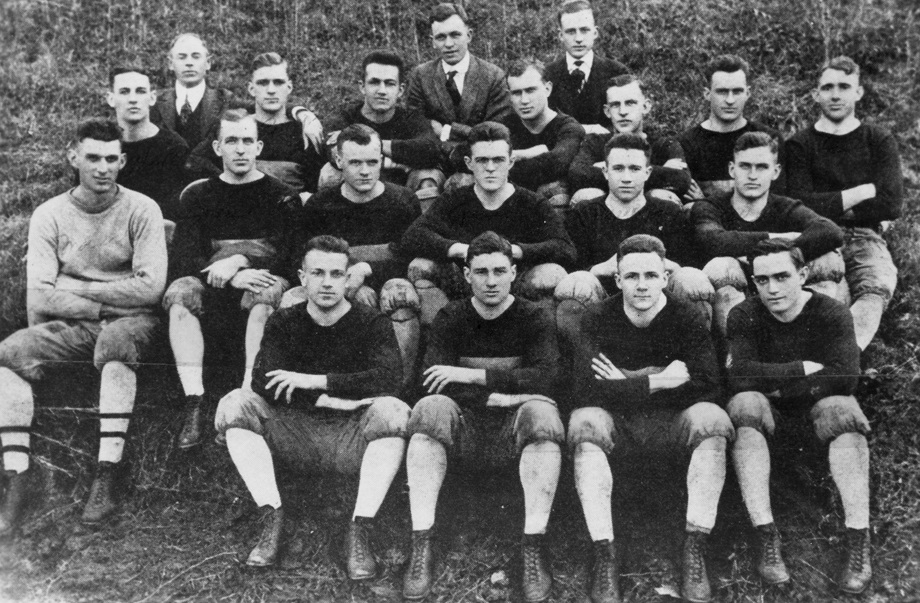
Georgia Tech team of 1916

Cumberland College, a Presbyterian school in Lebanon, Tennessee, had discontinued its football program before the season but was not allowed to cancel its game against the Yellow Jackets. The fact that Cumberland's baseball team had crushed Georgia Tech earlier that year 22–0 (amidst allegations that Cumberland used professionals as ringers) probably accounted for Georgia Tech coach John Heisman's running up the score on the Bulldogs, as Heisman was also Georgia Tech's baseball coach. It is speculated that Heisman may have deliberately aimed for a score of exactly 222 as a numerically significant retaliation to Cumberland's 22. Another reason for Heisman's plan to run up the score was the practice among the sportswriters of the time to rank teams based upon how many points they scored. Since this statistic did not account for the strength or weakness of a team's opponent, Heisman disagreed with the amount of weight the writers tended to assign to it, and he may have unleashed his players on Cumberland to make his point.

Heisman insisted on the schools' scheduling agreement, which required Cumberland to pay $3,000 (equivalent to $89,000 in 2025) to Tech if its football team failed to show. In fact, Heisman actually paid Cumberland $500 (equivalent to $14,800 in 2025) as an incentive to play the game; his letter to Cumberland's athletic department read in part:

I hereby offer you the sum of $500 and an all-expenses-paid trip to Atlanta for your football team on the condition that you honor your contract by participating in and completing the Cumberland-Georgia Tech football game ... However, if this offer is refused ... I shall be forced to demand that your school reimburse the Tech Athletic Dept. in the amount of $3,000 for losses from the projected net gate receipts ...

George E. Allen (who was elected to serve as Cumberland's football team student manager after first serving as the baseball team student manager) therefore put together a scrub team of 12–16 players, (Note: Conflicting sources report anywhere from 12 to 19 players (and of those 19, three got lost in Nashville and missed their train, leaving at most only 16 players).) most of whom were his fraternity brothers or law students, to travel to Atlanta as Cumberland's football team.

== The game ==
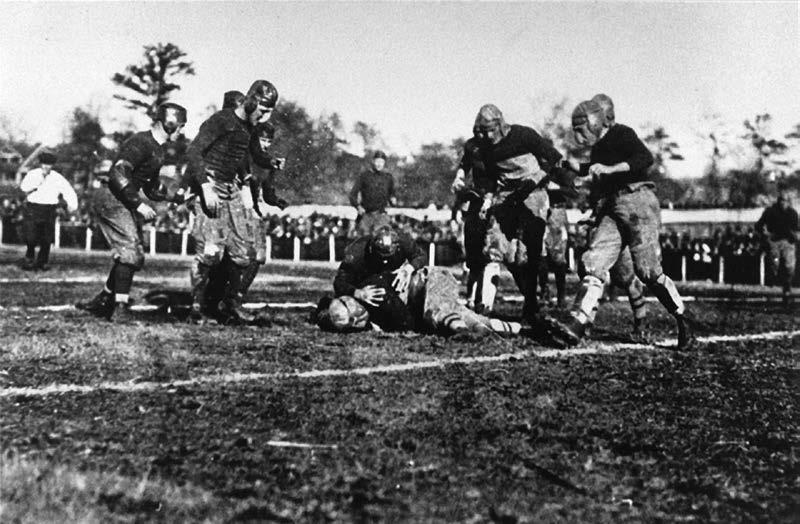
Georgia Tech's players tackle a Cumberland running back during the game

Cumberland received the opening kickoff and failed to make a first down. After a punt, the Yellow Jackets scored on their first play. Cumberland then fumbled on their next play from the line of scrimmage, and a Georgia Tech player returned the fumble for a touchdown. The Bulldogs fumbled again on their next play, and it took Georgia Tech two rushes to score its third touchdown. Cumberland lost nine yards on its next possession, and Georgia Tech scored a fourth touchdown on another two-play drive.

Georgia Tech led 63–0 after the first quarter and 126–0 at halftime. Georgia Tech added 54 more points in the third quarter and 42 in the final period. Several players on the heavily-outmatched Cumberland side suffered serious injuries during the game, including quarterback Charles Edwards, who was thrice carted off with concussions.

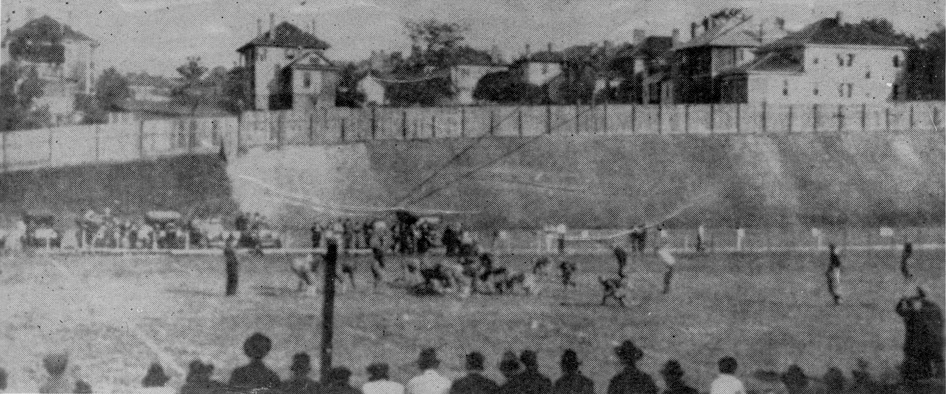
Panoramic view of the stadium during the game

Georgia Tech scored a total of 32 touchdowns, and Georgia Tech's left end James Preas kicked 18 extra points. Cumberland's only effective defense was an extra point blocked with a sort of human pyramid known as the "climb-the-ladder" play, topped with Vichy Woods, who suffered a gruesome facial injury on the play. Despite scoring 32 touchdowns, the Yellow Jackets did not complete or attempt a forward pass; all their yardage came on rushes, returns or defensive plays.

Several myths have developed around the game. Some have written that Cumberland did not have a single play that gained yards; in fact, its longest play was a 10-yard pass (on 4th-and-22 or 3rd-and-18). The Bulldogs gained positive yardage on at least six plays, though they fumbled on two of them. One page on Cumberland's website says Georgia Tech scored on every offensive play, but the play-by-play account of the game refutes this and suggests a more likely scenario: that Georgia Tech scored on every one of its sets of downs. Cumberland made no first downs in the entire game.

Cumberland purportedly committed 15 turnovers—nine fumbles and six interceptions—during the game.

As a general rule, the only thing necessary for a touchdown was to give a Tech back the ball and holler, 'Here he comes' and 'There he goes.'

— The Atlanta Journal, 1916

Sportswriter Grantland Rice wrote, "Cumberland's greatest individual play of the game occurred when fullback Allen circled right end for a 6-yard loss." At halftime, Heisman reportedly told his players, "You're doing all right, team, we're ahead. But you just can't tell what those Cumberland players have up their sleeves. They may spring a surprise. Be alert, men! Hit 'em clean, but hit 'em hard!" However, even Heisman relented, and shortened the third and fourth quarters from 15 minutes to 12.

=== Statistics ===
These statistics are based on the play-by-play transcript and may be incomplete.

| Team | Rushing | | | | Passing | | | | Kicking | |
| Team | Att | Yards | TD | Fumb Lost | Comp–Att | Yards | TD | Int | FGM–FGA | XPM–XPA |
|---|---|---|---|---|---|---|---|---|---|---|
| Cumberland | 27 | −42 | 0 | 9 | 2–18 | 14 | 0 | 6 | 0–0 | 0–0 |
| Georgia Tech | 26 | 922 | 32 | 0 | 0–0 | 0 | 0 | 0 | 0–0 | 30–32 |

=== Summary ===
1916 Week Two: Cumberland Bulldogs at Georgia Tech Yellow Jackets

| Quarter | 1 | 2 | 3 | 4 | Total |
|---|---|---|---|---|---|
| Cumberland | 0 | 0 | 0 | 0 | 0 |
| Georgia Tech | 63 | 63 | 54 | 42 | 222 |

at Grant Field, Atlanta

- Date: October 7, 1916
- Game time: 3:00 p.m. EST
- Play-by-Play

Game information

First quarter

- GT Strupper 80 yard run (Jim Preas kick) (Georgia Tech 7–0)
- GT Marshall Guill 10 yard fumble return (Preas kick) (Georgia Tech 14–0)
- GT Preas 5 yard run (Preas kick) (Georgia Tech 21–0)
- GT Strupper 10 yard run (Preas kick) (Georgia Tech 28–0)
- GT Canty Alexander recovered own fumble in end zone (Preas kick) (Georgia Tech 35–0)
- GT Strupper 60 yard run (Preas kick) (Georgia Tech 42–0)
- GT Tommy Spence 35 yard run (Preas kick) (Georgia Tech 49–0)
- GT Strupper 45 yard punt return (Preas kick) (Georgia Tech 56–0)
- GT Spence 90 yard kickoff return (Preas kick) (Georgia Tech 63–0)

Second quarter

- GT Jim Senter 20 yard run (Preas kick) (Georgia Tech 70–0)
- GT Preas 15 yard run (Preas kick) (Georgia Tech 77–0)
- GT Guill 20 yard interception return (Preas kick) (Georgia Tech 84–0)
- GT George Griffin 10 yard run (Preas kick) (Georgia Tech 91–0)
- GT Strupper 3 yard run (Preas kick) (Georgia Tech 98–0)
- GT Bob Glover 4 yard run (Preas kick) (Georgia Tech 105–0)
- GT Preas 10 yard fumble return (Preas kick) (Georgia Tech 112–0)
- GT Stan Fellers 17 yard interception return (Preas kick) (Georgia Tech 119–0)
- GT Fellers 33 yard punt return (Preas kick) (Georgia Tech 126–0)

Third quarter

- GT Strupper 3 yard run (Spence kick) (Georgia Tech 133–0)
- GT Buzz Shaver 25 yard punt return (Spence kick) (Georgia Tech 140–0)
- GT Spence 10 yard run (Spence kick) (Georgia Tech 147–0)
- GT Strupper 15 yard run (Spence kick) (Georgia Tech 154–0)
- GT Spence 35 yard run (Spence kick) (Georgia Tech 161–0)
- GT W.G. "Six" Carpenter 8 yard run (kick failed) (Georgia Tech 167–0)
- GT Strupper 35 yard punt return (kick failed) (Georgia Tech 173–0)
- GT Spence 20 yard interception return (Strupper kick) (Georgia Tech 180–0)

Fourth quarter

- GT Fellers 40 yard interception return (Bill Fincher kick) (Georgia Tech 187–0)
- GT Griffin 35 yard run (Fincher kick) (Georgia Tech 194–0)
- GT Senter 2 yard run (Fincher kick) (Georgia Tech 201–0)
- GT Fellers 40 yard punt return (Fincher kick) (Georgia Tech 208–0)
- GT Fellers 15 yard run (Fincher kick) (Georgia Tech 215–0)
- GT Senter 30 yard interception return (Fincher kick) (Georgia Tech 222–0)

Top passers

- CU – Leon McDonald – 2/18, 14 YDS, 6 INT
- GT – none (no pass attempts)

Top rushers

- CU – Morris Gouger – 4 CAR, -2 YDS
- GT – G.E. "Strup" Strupper – 8 CAR, 195 YDS, 6 TD

Top receivers

- CU – George Murphy (Note: "George Murphy" may have actually been a ringer named John "Johnny Dog" Nelson, a sportswriter who had previous football experience.) – REC, 10 YDS
- GT – none (no pass attempts)

== Records ==
The previous records for highest score in a football game had been set in 1913: 150–0, won by Newberry College against Bailey Military Institute, and 144–0, won by the Florida Gators against Florida Southern. In the preceding 45 years of college football, only 36 games had exceeded 100 points, and only seven of those were against teams also from a college.

Since World War II, only a handful of schools have topped 100 points in a college football game. The modern-era record for most points scored against a college opponent is 106 by Fort Valley State of Georgia against Knoxville College in 1969. In the previous year Houston defeated Tulsa 100–6 to set the NCAA record in major college football. In 1949 the University of Wyoming defeated University of Northern Colorado 103–0. The Division III football scoring record was set in 1968 when North Park University defeated North Central College 104–32, using ten passing touchdowns along the way.

Georgia Tech's defeat of Cumberland College was so lopsided that their halftime score of 126–0 still holds significance. Had the game ended at halftime as a game today, it would still have ranked as the highest-scoring collegiate football game since West Liberty State defeated Cedarville 137–0 on November 19, 1932. In modern times, the last instance of a team almost scoring Georgia Tech's halftime total in a full game occurred on October 22, 1949, when Connecticut defeated Newport NTS 125–0.

== Legacy ==
The game ball had the score written on it as a memento. It was donated to the Helms Athletic Foundation sports museum by Bill Schroeder, an avid sports collector. When the museum moved in the 1980s, the ball was boxed and remained in storage. In 2014, Ryan Schneider, a Georgia Tech alumnus, purchased the ball in a charity auction for $40,388 ($33,657 without buyer's premium) with the intention of donating it back to Georgia Tech.

In October 1956, a 40th reunion was held for players from both teams, of whom 28 attended. While reminiscing, one of the Cumberland players pointed out one play that saved Cumberland from an even worse defeat; had Cumberland punted as normal instead of running a sneak, the score would probably have been 229–0.

While Cumberland's football team would eventually be restarted full-time (and change its nickname to the Phoenix in 2016), the two schools have not met in any sports since: Cumberland would eventually de-emphasize athletics, and currently competes in the NAIA, while Georgia Tech would go on to be a founding member of the Southeastern Conference before departing the SEC in 1964, and is currently a member of the Atlantic Coast Conference.

In any case, current NCAA rules only allow Division III schools to compete against NAIA schools.

== See also ==
- 1992 Troy State vs. DeVry men's basketball game – the highest scoring college basketball game in history
- List of historically significant college football games
