= 1916 Mississippi Normal Normalites football team =

American college football season

1916 Mississippi Normal Normalites football
- Conference: Independent
- Record: 0–3
- Head coach: A. B. Dille (3rd season)
- Home stadium: Kamper Park

1916 Southern college football independents records
	Conf.			Overall
Team	W	L	T	W		L		T
Birmingham		–		7	–	1	–	0
Southwestern Louisiana Industrial		–		7	–	1	–	0
Maryland State		–		6	–	2	–	0
Marshall		–		7	–	2	–	1
Stetson		–		3	–	1	–	0
Middle Tennessee State Normal		–		5	–	2	–	0
Sam Houston Normal		–		5	–	2	–	0
Spring Hill		–		4	–	2	–	0
West Virginia		–		5	–	2	–	2
Navy		–		6	–	3	–	1
Southwest Texas State		–		3	–	1	–	3
Presbyterian		–		4	–	3	–	0
Delaware		–		4	–	3	–	1
North Texas State Normal		–		4	–	3	–	1
Western Kentucky State Normal		–		3	–	2	–	0
Wake Forest		–		3	–	3	–	0
Louisville		–		2	–	3	–	1
West Tennessee State Normal		–		2	–	3	–	1
Texas Mines		–		2	–	3	–	0
Tusculum		–		2	–	3	–	0
Cumberland (TN)		–		0	–	2	–	0

The 1916 Mississippi Normal Normalites football team was an American football team that represented Mississippi Normal College (now known as the University of Southern Mississippi) as an independent during the 1916 college football season. In their third year under head coach A. B. Dille, the team compiled an 0–3 record. Official records indicate a further five games were played by Normal, but the scores from them are unknown.

== Schedule ==
Date	Opponent	Site	Result
October 16	at Meridian High School	Meridian, MS	L 0–31
November 7	Mississippi College	Kamper Park; Hattiesburg, MS	L 0–75
November 11	at Spring Hill	Mobile, AL	L 0–87
