= Doug Henry =

Douglas or Doug Henry may refer to:

- Doug Henry (baseball) (born 1963), American former Major League Baseball relief pitcher
- Doug Henry (motocross) (born 1969), American former motocross racer, three-time AMA national champion
- Douglas "Duck" Henry (1890–1971), American politician, football player and coach
- Douglas Henry (1926–2017), American politician from Tennessee
