= Senator Henry (disambiguation) =

John Henry (Maryland politician) (1750–1798) was a U.S. Senator from Maryland from 1789 to 1797. Senator Henry may also refer to:

- Al B. Henry (1911–1989), Washington State Senate
- Brad Henry (born 1963), Oklahoma State Senate
- Cameron Henry (fl. 2000s–present), Louisiana State Senate
- Charles L. Henry (1849–1927), Indiana State Senate
- Daniel Maynadier Henry (1823–1899), Maryland State Senate
- Douglas Henry (1926–2017), Tennessee State Senate
- Douglas "Duck" Henry (1890–1971), Tennessee State Senate
- E. Stevens Henry (1836–1921), Connecticut State Senate
- Gustavus Adolphus Henry Sr. (1804-1880), Confederate States Senator from Tennessee from 1862 to 1865
- Harry D. Henry (1876–1929), Oklahoma State Senate
- Jim Henry (Iowa politician) (1896–1997), Iowa State Senate
- John Henry (representative) (1800–1882), Illinois State Senate
- Margaret Rose Henry (born 1944), Delaware State Senate
- Morriss Henry (born 1931), Arkansas State Senate
- Owen Henry (born 1959), New Jersey State Senate
- Pat Henry (politician) (1861–1933), Mississippi State Senate
- Patrick Henry (Mississippi politician) (1843–1930), Mississippi State Senate
- Paul B. Henry (1942–1993), Michigan State Senate
- William Wirt Henry (1831–1900), Virginia State Senate
