= Birmingham football, 1904–1917 =

American college football seasons

Birmingham football, 1904–1917 encompassed all of the seasons of college football played at Birmingham College prior to its merger with Southern University in 1918 to form Birmingham–Southern College. The team competed as an independent and played its home games at several locations in Birmingham, Alabama. Birmingham played its first season in 1904, and after going winless in its first two seasons, it defeated Alabama Presbyterian in 1907 for the first victory in the school's history. Birmingham played smaller Alabama schools exclusively through 1909, after which they played larger schools like Alabama, Mississippi A&M, and Vanderbilt.

Douglas "Duck" Henry was the first person to serve as head coach for more than a single season, leading the team to a 1–12–1 record in 1911 and 1912. He was followed by Wallace Pinson who coached the team to a 5–8–2 record from 1913 to 1915. Charles H. Brown took over as head coach in 1916 and led the team to its most successful season to date with a 7–1 record and shutout victories in its final six games.

== Seasons overview ==
Year	Head coach	Wins	Losses	Ties	Winning percentage	Points scored	Points allowed
1904	Unknown	0	3	0	.000	0	128
1906	Unknown	0	2	1	0.167	5	66
1907	Ray Stanley	1	3	0	0.250	41	98
1908	S. R. Batson	0	3	3	0.250	21	34
1909	Luther Leonard	4	2	0	0.667	53	47
1910	Vaughn Blake	3	3	1	0.500	23	99
1911	Douglas "Duck" Henry	0	6	1	0.071	10	208
1912	Douglas "Duck" Henry	1	6	0	0.143	19	193
1913	Wallace Pinson	0	5	0	.000	0	296
1914	Wallace Pinson	3	1	1	0.700	110	69
1915	Wallace Pinson	2	2	1	0.500	57	87
1916	Charles H. Brown	7	1	0	0.875	243	19

== 1904 ==
1904 Birmingham football
- Conference: Independent
- Record: 0–3
- Head coach: Unknown
- Home stadium: West End Park

1904 Southern college football independents records
	Conf.			Overall
Team	W	L	T	W		L		T
Georgetown		–		7	–	1	–	0
Southwest Texas State		–		5	–	1	–	0
Southwestern Louisiana Industrial		–		2	–	0	–	1
Davidson		–		6	–	1	–	1
Navy		–		7	–	2	–	1
North Carolina		–		5	–	2	–	2
Virginia		–		6	–	3	–	0
North Carolina A&M		–		3	–	1	–	2
West Virginia		–		6	–	3	–	0
VPI		–		5	–	3	–	0
George Washington		–		4	–	2	–	2
Arkansas		–		4	–	3	–	0
Oklahoma		–		4	–	3	–	1
South Carolina		–		4	–	3	–	1
Stetson		–		2	–	2	–	0
Central Oklahoma		–		2	–	3	–	0
VMI		–		3	–	5	–	0
Kentucky University		–		3	–	4	–	0
Grant		–		2	–	3	–	0
Florida State College		–		2	–	3	–	0
Maryland		–		2	–	4	–	2
East Florida Seminary		–		1	–	2	–	0
Goldey College		–		1	–	2	–	0
Baylor		–		2	–	5	–	1
Louisiana Industrial		–		1	–	4	–	0
TCU		–		1	–	4	–	1
Delaware		–		1	–	5	–	1
Kendall		–		0	–	2	–	1
Rollins		–		0	–	1	–	0
Tusculum		–		0	–	2	–	0
Birmingham		–		0	–	3	–	0
Florida at Lake City		–		0	–	5	–	0
Oklahoma A&M		–		0	–	6	–	0
Tennessee Docs		–		0	–	7	–	0

The 1904 Birmingham football team was an American football team that represented Birmingham College (later merged with Southern College to become Birmingham–Southern College) as an independent during the 1904 college football season. Birmingham compiled a 0–3 record for the season. This was the first season of intercollegiate football played at the College.

=== Schedule ===
Date	Opponent	Site	Result	Source
October 27	at Jacksonville State	Jacksonville, AL	L 0–37	
November 19	Birmingham High School (AL)	West End Park; Birmingham, AL	L 0–62	
November 24	at Marion	Athletic Field; Marion, AL	L 0–29	

== 1906 ==
1906 Birmingham football
- Conference: Independent
- Record: 0–2–1
- Head coach: Unknown
- Home stadium: West End Park

1906 Southern college football independents records
	Conf.			Overall
Team	W	L	T	W		L		T
The Citadel		–		3	–	0	–	0
Kendall		–		2	–	0	–	0
Catholic University		–		1	–	0	–	0
Georgetown		–		6	–	1	–	0
Texas A&M		–		6	–	1	–	0
Delaware		–		5	–	1	–	0
Navy		–		8	–	2	–	2
Southwestern Louisiana Industrial		–		1	–	0	–	1
Stetson		–		3	–	1	–	0
Virginia		–		7	–	2	–	2
Howard (AL)		–		6	–	2	–	1
Oklahoma		–		5	–	2	–	2
VPI		–		5	–	2	–	2
Kentucky State		–		4	–	3	–	0
Davidson		–		3	–	2	–	2
Florida		–		5	–	3	–	0
North Carolina A&M		–		3	–	1	–	4
Louisiana Industrial		–		2	–	1	–	3
West Virginia		–		5	–	5	–	0
George Washington		–		4	–	3	–	2
VMI		–		4	–	4	–	0
Grant		–		3	–	3	–	0
Arkansas		–		2	–	4	–	2
TCU		–		2	–	5	–	0
North Carolina		–		1	–	4	–	2
Oklahoma A&M		–		1	–	4	–	2
Roanoke		–		1	–	4	–	2
Rollins		–		1	–	3	–	0
Birmingham		–		0	–	2	–	1
Goldey College		–		0	–	3	–	0

The 1906 Birmingham football team was an American football team that represented Birmingham College (later merged with Southern College to become Birmingham–Southern College) as an independent during the 1906 college football season. Birmingham compiled a 0–2–1 record for the season.

=== Schedule ===
Date	Opponent	Site	Result	Source
October 23	vs. Howard (AL)	West End Park; Birmingham, AL	L 0–51	
October 31	Birmingham High School (AL)	West End Park; Birmingham, AL	L 5–15	
November 29	at Fifth District Agricultural School (AL)	Wetumpka, AL	T 0–0	

== 1907 ==
1907 Birmingham football
- Conference: Independent
- Record: 1–3
- Head coach: Ray Stanley (1st season)
- Home stadium: West End Park

1907 Southern college football independents records
	Conf.			Overall
Team	W	L	T	W		L		T
South Carolina		–		3	–	0	–	0
Stetson		–		2	–	0	–	0
Southwestern Louisiana Industrial		–		1	–	0	–	0
Mississippi College		–		1	–	0	–	0
North Carolina A&M		–		6	–	0	–	1
Louisiana Industrial		–		9	–	1	–	0
Kentucky State		–		9	–	1	–	1
Texas		–		6	–	1	–	1
Texas A&M		–		6	–	1	–	1
Davidson		–		4	–	1	–	1
Florida		–		4	–	1	–	1
Navy		–		9	–	2	–	1
VPI		–		7	–	2	–	0
Virginia		–		6	–	3	–	1
TCU		–		4	–	2	–	2
West Virginia		–		6	–	4	–	0
VMI		–		5	–	3	–	0
Tulane		–		3	–	2	–	0
Oklahoma		–		4	–	4	–	0
North Carolina		–		4	–	4	–	1
Baylor		–		4	–	3	–	1
Arkansas		–		4	–	4	–	1
Maryland		–		3	–	5	–	0
George Washington		–		2	–	4	–	1
The Citadel		–		2	–	4	–	1
Georgetown		–		2	–	4	–	1
Oklahoma A&M		–		1	–	5	–	2
Birmingham		–		1	–	3	–	0
Chattanooga		–		0	–	5	–	1
Delaware		–		0	–	5	–	1
Catholic University		–		0	–	1	–	0
Louisiana Normal		–		0	–	1	–	0
South Carolina State		–		0	–	1	–	0
Spring Hill		–		0	–	1	–	0

The 1907 Birmingham football team was an American football team that represented Birmingham College (later merged with Southern College to become Birmingham–Southern College) as an independent during the 1907 college football season. Under first-year head coach Ray Stanley, Birmingham compiled a 1–3 record.

=== Schedule ===
Date	Opponent	Site	Result	Source
October 30	at St. Bernard	Cullman, AL	L 0–5	
November 9	at Alabama Presbyterian	Anniston, AL	W 35–0	
November 23	vs. Howard (AL)	West End Park; Birmingham, AL	L 0–83	
November 28	at Marion	Marion, AL	L 6–10	

== 1908 ==
1908 Birmingham football
- Conference: Independent
- Record: 0–3–3
- Head coach: S. R. Batson (1st season)
- Home stadium: West End Park

1908 Southern college football independents records
	Conf.			Overall
Team	W	L	T	W		L		T
Southwestern Louisiana Industrial		–		6	–	0	–	0
Virginia		–		7	–	0	–	1
Rollins		–		4	–	0	–	1
George Washington		–		8	–	1	–	1
Oklahoma		–		8	–	1	–	1
Tulane		–		7	–	1	–	0
North Carolina A&M		–		6	–	1	–	0
The Citadel		–		4	–	1	–	1
Navy		–		9	–	2	–	1
Florida		–		5	–	2	–	1
TCU		–		6	–	3	–	0
VMI		–		4	–	2	–	0
Davidson		–		5	–	3	–	1
Baylor		–		5	–	3	–	0
West Virginia		–		5	–	3	–	0
Kentucky State		–		4	–	3	–	0
Louisiana Industrial		–		4	–	3	–	1
Arkansas		–		5	–	4	–	0
Texas		–		5	–	4	–	0
VPI		–		5	–	4	–	0
Arkansas State Normal		–		3	–	3	–	0
Chattanooga		–		4	–	4	–	0
North Carolina		–		3	–	3	–	3
Oklahoma A&M		–		4	–	4	–	0
Delaware		–		3	–	4	–	1
Kendall		–		2	–	3	–	0
South Carolina		–		3	–	5	–	1
Texas A&M		–		3	–	5	–	0
Georgetown		–		2	–	4	–	1
Howard (AL)		–		2	–	4	–	0
Maryland		–		3	–	8	–	0
Birmingham		–		0	–	3	–	3
Stetson		–		0	–	1	–	1
Wake Forest		–		1	–	4	–	0
Goldey College		–		0	–	2	–	1
Mississippi College		–		0	–	1	–	0
Southwest Texas State		–		0	–	2	–	0
Marshall		–		0	–	6	–	0

The 1908 Birmingham football team was an American football team that represented Birmingham College (later merged with Southern College to become Birmingham–Southern College) as an independent during the 1908 college football season. Under first-year head coach S. R. Batson, Birmingham compiled a 0–3–3 record.

=== Schedule ===
Date	Opponent	Site	Result	Source
October 17	at Blountsville Aggies	Blountsville, AL	T 0–0	
October	at Jacksonville State	Jacksonville, AL	L 0–6	
November 3	Birmingham High School (AL)	West End Park; Birmingham, AL	T 4–4	
November 7	at Seventh District Agricultural (AL)	Marshall County Fairgrounds; Albertville, AL	T 6–6	
November 21	vs. Howard (AL)	West End Park; Birmingham, AL	L 11–12	
November 26	at Marion	Marion, AL	L 0–6	

== 1909 ==
1909 Birmingham football
- Conference: Independent
- Record: 4–2
- Head coach: Luther Leonard (1st season)
- Home stadium: West End Park

1909 Southern college football independents records
	Conf.			Overall
Team	W	L	T	W		L		T
Arkansas		–		7	–	0	–	0
Texas A&M		–		7	–	0	–	1
Mississippi College		–		3	–	0	–	0
Stetson		–		3	–	0	–	1
Kentucky State		–		9	–	1	–	0
Virginia		–		7	–	1	–	0
North Carolina A&M		–		6	–	1	–	0
VPI		–		6	–	1	–	0
Florida		–		6	–	1	–	1
Elon		–		4	–	1	–	0
Louisiana Industrial		–		4	–	1	–	0
Spring Hill		–		4	–	1	–	0
Catholic University		–		0	–	1	–	1
North Carolina		–		5	–	2	–	0
Birmingham		–		4	–	2	–	0
Kendall		–		2	–	1	–	0
Southwestern Louisiana Industrial		–		5	–	2	–	2
Marshall		–		3	–	2	–	1
VMI		–		4	–	3	–	0
Navy		–		4	–	3	–	1
Texas		–		4	–	3	–	1
Tulane		–		4	–	3	–	2
West Virginia		–		4	–	3	–	2
Washington and Lee		–		4	–	3	–	0
Oklahoma		–		6	–	4	–	0
Georgetown		–		3	–	2	–	1
Oklahoma A&M		–		5	–	3	–	0
Davidson		–		3	–	4	–	2
George Washington		–		3	–	4	–	1
Chattanooga		–		2	–	3	–	2
Wake Forest		–		2	–	4	–	0
Maryland		–		2	–	5	–	0
South Carolina		–		2	–	6	–	0
Delaware		–		1	–	6	–	1

The 1909 Birmingham football team was an American football team that represented Birmingham College (later merged with Southern College to become Birmingham–Southern College) as an independent during the 1909 college football season. Under first-year head coach Luther Leonard, Birmingham compiled a 4–2 record.

=== Schedule ===
Date	Opponent	Site	Result	Source
October 2	at Mississippi A&M	Hardy Field; Starkville, MS	L 0–21	
October 15	at Southern (AL)	Greensboro, AL	W 16–0	
October 23	Blountsville Aggies	West End Park; Birmingham, AL	W 11–0	
October 30	at Seventh District Agricultural (AL)	Marshall County Fairgrounds; Albertville, AL	W 9–0	
November 6	at Alabama Presbyterian	Anniston, AL	W 17–0	
November 20	Howard (AL)	West End Park; Birmingham, AL	L 0–26	

== 1910 ==
1910 Birmingham football
- Conference: Independent
- Record: 3–3–1
- Head coach: Vaughn Blake (1st season)
- Home stadium: West End Park

1910 Southern college football independents records
	Conf.			Overall
Team	W	L	T	W		L		T
Central University		–		9	–	0	–	0
Louisiana Industrial		–		7	–	0	–	0
Stetson		–		3	–	0	–	0
Navy		–		8	–	0	–	1
North Carolina A&M		–		4	–	0	–	2
Spring Hill		–		3	–	0	–	1
Texas A&M		–		8	–	1	–	0
Arkansas		–		7	–	1	–	0
Florida		–		6	–	1	–	0
Baylor		–		6	–	1	–	1
Georgetown		–		6	–	1	–	1
Marshall		–		5	–	1	–	1
Kentucky State		–		7	–	2	–	0
Texas		–		6	–	2	–	0
Virginia		–		6	–	2	–	0
Southwestern Louisiana Industrial		–		6	–	2	–	1
Chattanooga		–		5	–	2	–	1
Kendall		–		2	–	1	–	1
Maryland		–		4	–	3	–	1
Oklahoma		–		4	–	2	–	1
Washington and Lee		–		4	–	3	–	0
South Carolina		–		4	–	4	–	0
Birmingham		–		3	–	3	–	1
VMI		–		3	–	3	–	1
Davidson		–		3	–	4	–	2
Oklahoma A&M		–		3	–	4	–	0
West Virginia		–		2	–	4	–	1
Catholic University		–		2	–	4	–	0
North Carolina		–		3	–	6	–	0
George Washington		–		2	–	2	–	2
Wake Forest		–		2	–	7	–	0
Delaware		–		1	–	2	–	2
Mississippi College		–		0	–	4	–	0
Southwest Texas State		–		0	–	4	–	0
Tulane		–		0	–	7	–	0

The 1910 Birmingham football team was an American football team that represented Birmingham College (later merged with Southern College to become Birmingham–Southern College) as an independent during the 1910 college football season. Under first-year head coach Vaughn Blake, Birmingham compiled a 3–3–1 record.

=== Schedule ===
Date	Opponent	Site	Result	Source
October 1	at Alabama	The Quad; Tuscaloosa, AL	L 0–25	
October 7	Blountsville Aggies	West End Park; Birmingham, AL	W 3–0	
October 22	at Chattanooga	Chamberlain Field; Chattanooga, TN	L 0–28	
October 31	at Southern (AL)	Greensboro, AL	W 10–0	
November 7	Marion	West End Park; Birmingham, AL	T 0–0	
November 12	at Mississippi A&M	Hardy Field; Starkville, MS	L 0–46	
November 19	Alabama Presbyterian	West End Park; Birmingham, AL	W 10–0	

== 1911 ==
1911 Birmingham football
- Conference: Independent
- Record: 0–6–1
- Head coach: Douglas "Duck" Henry (1st season)
- Home stadium: Munger Bowl

1911 Southern college football independents records
	Conf.			Overall
Team	W	L	T	W		L		T
Oklahoma		–		8	–	0	–	0
Florida		–		5	–	0	–	1
VMI		–		7	–	1	–	0
Texas A&M		–		6	–	1	–	0
Georgetown		–		7	–	1	–	1
Navy		–		6	–	0	–	3
North Carolina		–		6	–	1	–	1
VPI		–		6	–	1	–	2
Virginia		–		8	–	2	–	0
Louisiana Industrial		–		4	–	1	–	1
Marshall		–		4	–	1	–	1
Arkansas		–		6	–	2	–	1
Oklahoma A&M		–		5	–	2	–	0
Texas		–		5	–	2	–	0
Washington and Lee		–		4	–	2	–	2
West Virginia		–		6	–	3	–	0
Davidson		–		5	–	3	–	0
North Carolina A&M		–		5	–	3	–	0
Chattanooga		–		3	–	2	–	0
Catholic University		–		3	–	2	–	2
Maryland		–		4	–	4	–	2
Baylor		–		3	–	4	–	2
Wake Forest		–		3	–	5	–	0
Delaware		–		2	–	5	–	2
South Carolina		–		1	–	4	–	2
Southwestern Louisiana Industrial		–		1	–	4	–	1
Spring Hill		–		1	–	3	–	0
Southwest Texas State		–		1	–	3	–	0
Stetson		–		1	–	3	–	0
Birmingham		–		0	–	6	–	1
Middle Tennessee State Normal		–		0	–	1	–	0

The 1911 Birmingham football team was an American football team that represented Birmingham College (later merged with Southern College to become Birmingham–Southern College) as an independent during the 1911 college football season. Under first-year head coach Douglas "Duck" Henry, Birmingham compiled a 0–6–1 record.

=== Schedule ===
Date	Opponent	Site	Result	Source
September 23	at Seventh District Agricultural (AL)	Marshall County Fairgrounds; Albertville, AL	L 0–30	
September 30	at Vanderbilt	Dudley Field; Nashville, TN	L 0–40	
October 7	at Alabama	The Quad; Tuscaloosa, AL	L 5–47	
October 27	at Marion	Marion, AL	L 0–23	
November 3	at Mississippi A&M	Hardy Field; Starkville, MS	L 0–62	
November 17	vs. Howard (AL)	Rickwood Field; Birmingham, AL	L 5–6	
November 30	at Alabama Presbyterian	Anniston, AL	T 0–0	

== 1912 ==
1912 Birmingham football
- Conference: Independent
- Record: 1–6
- Head coach: Douglas "Duck" Henry (2nd season)
- Home stadium: Munger Bowl

1912 Southern college football independents records
	Conf.			Overall
Team	W	L	T	W		L		T
Middle Tennessee State Normal		–		1	–	0	–	0
Texas		–		7	–	1	–	0
VMI		–		7	–	1	–	0
Maryland		–		6	–	1	–	1
Oklahoma A&M		–		5	–	2	–	0
Stetson		–		5	–	2	–	0
Livingstone		–		3	–	1	–	1
Louisville		–		3	–	1	–	0
Mississippi Normal		–		2	–	1	–	0
South Carolina		–		5	–	2	–	1
Navy		–		6	–	3	–	0
Spring Hill		–		4	–	2	–	0
West Virginia		–		6	–	3	–	0
Oklahoma		–		5	–	4	–	0
Rice		–		3	–	2	–	0
Chattanooga		–		4	–	4	–	0
Morris Harvey		–		2	–	2	–	0
Sam Houston Normal		–		2	–	2	–	0
Southwest Texas State		–		3	–	3	–	2
Davidson		–		3	–	4	–	0
Marshall		–		3	–	4	–	0
Southwestern Louisiana Industrial		–		3	–	4	–	0
Tennessee Docs		–		3	–	4	–	0
Arkansas		–		4	–	6	–	0
Baylor		–		3	–	5	–	0
Catholic University		–		3	–	5	–	0
Louisiana Industrial		–		1	–	2	–	1
West Tennessee State Normal		–		1	–	2	–	1
Wake Forest		–		2	–	6	–	0
Kendall		–		1	–	4	–	0
Delaware		–		1	–	6	–	1
Birmingham		–		1	–	6	–	0
Biddle		–		0	–	1	–	0

The 1912 Birmingham football team was an American football team that represented Birmingham College (later merged with Southern College to become Birmingham–Southern College) as an independent during the 1912 college football season. Under second-year head coach Douglas "Duck" Henry, Birmingham compiled a 1–6 record.

=== Schedule ===
Date	Opponent	Site	Result	Source
October 5	at Alabama	The Quad; Tuscaloosa, AL	L 0–62	
October 14	Ensley High School	Birmingham, AL	L Unknown	
October 19	at Seventh District Agricultural (AL)	Marshall County Fairgrounds; Albertville, AL	L 0–26	
October 25	Alabama Presbyterian	Munger Bowl; Birmingham, AL	L 0–24	
October 31	at Spring Hill	Maxon Field; Mobile, AL	L 6–12	
November 15	at Marion	Marion, AL	L 0–69	
November 22	vs. Howard (AL)	Rickwood Field; Birmingham, AL	W 13–6	

== 1913 ==
1913 Birmingham football
- Conference: Independent
- Record: 0–5
- Head coach: Wallace Pinson (1st season)
- Home stadium: Munger Bowl

1913 Southern college football independents records
	Conf.			Overall
Team	W	L	T	W		L		T
Stetson		–		3	–	0	–	0
Western Kentucky State Normal		–		1	–	0	–	0
Navy		–		7	–	1	–	1
VMI		–		7	–	1	–	2
Louisville		–		5	–	1	–	0
Middle Tennessee State Normal		–		5	–	1	–	1
Arkansas		–		7	–	2	–	0
Oklahoma		–		6	–	2	–	0
Kendall		–		5	–	2	–	0
Sam Houston Normal		–		3	–	1	–	1
TCU		–		5	–	2	–	1
Furman		–		6	–	3	–	0
Maryland		–		6	–	3	–	0
Ole Miss		–		6	–	3	–	1
Presbyterian		–		5	–	3	–	0
Howard (AL)		–		5	–	3	–	1
Richmond		–		5	–	3	–	1
Chattanooga		–		4	–	3	–	0
Oklahoma A&M		–		4	–	3	–	0
South Carolina		–		4	–	3	–	0
Southern College		–		1	–	1	–	0
Polytechnic (TX)		–		2	–	2	–	4
Southwestern Louisiana Industrial		–		4	–	4	–	0
Southwest Texas State		–		4	–	4	–	0
Spring Hill		–		3	–	3	–	0
West Virginia		–		3	–	4	–	2
Louisiana Industrial		–		3	–	4	–	1
Marshall		–		3	–	4	–	0
Delaware		–		2	–	4	–	2
Catholic University		–		1	–	4	–	1
Davidson		–		2	–	5	–	0
Mississippi Normal		–		1	–	5	–	1
West Tennessee State Normal		–		1	–	2	–	0
North Texas State Normal		–		0	–	1	–	0
Birmingham		–		0	–	5	–	0
Wake Forest		–		0	–	8	–	0

The 1913 Birmingham football team was an American football team that represented Birmingham College (later merged with Southern College to become Birmingham–Southern College) as an independent during the 1913 college football season. Under first-year head coach Wallace Pinson, Birmingham compiled a 0–5 record.

=== Schedule ===
Date	Opponent	Site	Result	Source
October 4	at Alabama	The Quad; Tuscaloosa, AL	L 0–81	
October 18	at Alabama Presbyterian	Anniston, AL	L 0–88	
October 25	at Chattanooga	Chamberlain Field; Chattanooga, TN	L 0–84	
November 1	Blount County High School	Munger Bowl; Birmingham, AL	L 0–12	
November 14	vs. Howard (AL)	Rickwood Field; Birmingham, AL	L 0–31	

== 1914 ==
1914 Birmingham football
- Conference: Independent
- Record: 3–1–1
- Head coach: Wallace Pinson (2nd season)
- Home stadium: Munger Bowl

1914 Southern college football independents records
	Conf.			Overall
Team	W	L	T	W		L		T
Texas		–		8	–	0	–	0
Middle Tennessee State Normal		–		5	–	0	–	1
Oklahoma		–		9	–	1	–	1
Delaware		–		7	–	1	–	1
Davidson		–		5	–	1	–	1
Birmingham		–		3	–	1	–	1
Georgia Tech		–		6	–	2	–	0
Presbyterian		–		4	–	1	–	1
Oklahoma A&M		–		6	–	2	–	1
Navy		–		6	–	3	–	0
Maryland		–		5	–	3	–	0
Southwestern Louisiana Industrial		–		5	–	3	–	0
Howard (AL)		–		4	–	3	–	1
Maryville (TN)		–		6	–	4	–	0
Sam Houston Normal		–		3	–	2	–	0
Marshall		–		5	–	4	–	0
West Virginia		–		5	–	4	–	0
Rice		–		3	–	2	–	3
North Texas State Normal		–		3	–	3	–	0
South Carolina		–		5	–	5	–	1
VMI		–		4	–	4	–	0
Mississippi Normal		–		2	–	3	–	1
Texas Mines		–		2	–	3	–	0
Western Kentucky State Normal		–		1	–	2	–	0
Baylor		–		3	–	5	–	2
West Tennessee State Normal		–		3	–	5	–	0
Arkansas		–		3	–	6	–	0
Louisiana Industrial		–		2	–	4	–	0
Wake Forest		–		3	–	6	–	0
Furman		–		2	–	5	–	0
Southwest Texas State		–		2	–	6	–	0
Stetson		–		1	–	4	–	0
Louisville		–		1	–	7	–	0
Catholic University		–		0	–	6	–	1

The 1914 Birmingham football team was an American football team that represented Birmingham College (later merged with Southern College to become Birmingham–Southern College) as an independent during the 1914 college football season. Under second-year head coach Wallace Pinson, Birmingham compiled a 3–1–1 record.

=== Schedule ===
Date	Opponent	Site	Result	Source
October 5	Seventh District Agricultural (AL)	Munger Bowl; Birmingham, AL	W 6–2	
October 10	at Alabama	The Quad; Tuscaloosa, AL	L 0–54	
October 16	at Marion	Marion, AL	W 20–7	
October 31	Alabama Presbyterian	Munger Bowl; Birmingham, AL	W 78–0	
November 13	vs. Howard (AL)	Rickwood Field; Birmingham, AL	T 6–6	

== 1915 ==
1915 Birmingham football
- Conference: Independent
- Record: 2–2–1
- Head coach: Wallace Pinson (3rd season)
- Home stadium: Munger Bowl

1915 Southern college football independents records
	Conf.			Overall
Team	W	L	T	W		L		T
Georgia Tech		–		7	–	0	–	1
Ouachita Baptist		–		7	–	1	–	0
Dallas		–		6	–	1	–	0
Spring Hill		–		6	–	1	–	0
North Texas State Normal		–		5	–	1	–	1
Sam Houston Normal		–		5	–	1	–	1
West Virginia		–		5	–	1	–	1
Jonesboro Aggies		–		4	–	1	–	1
Johns Hopkins		–		6	–	2	–	0
VMI		–		6	–	2	–	1
Southwestern Louisiana Industrial		–		5	–	2	–	1
Delaware		–		6	–	3	–	0
Maryland		–		6	–	3	–	0
Louisiana Normal College		–		4	–	2	–	0
Southwest Texas State		–		5	–	3	–	2
Davidson		–		4	–	3	–	1
Mississippi Normal		–		4	–	3	–	0
West Tennessee State Normal		–		4	–	3	–	0
Guilford		–		1	–	1	–	0
Middle Tennessee State Normal		–		3	–	3	–	1
Birmingham		–		2	–	2	–	1
Presbyterian		–		4	–	4	–	0
Henderson-Brown		–		3	–	4	–	1
TCU		–		4	–	5	–	0
Wake Forest		–		3	–	4	–	0
Navy		–		3	–	5	–	1
Western Kentucky State Normal		–		1	–	4	–	2
Louisville		–		1	–	5	–	1
Marshall		–		1	–	7	–	0

The 1915 Birmingham football team was an American football team that represented Birmingham College (later merged with Southern College to become Birmingham–Southern College) as an independent during the 1915 college football season. Under third-year head coach Wallace Pinson, Birmingham compiled a 2–2–1 record.

=== Schedule ===
Date	Opponent	Site	Result	Source
October 9	at Alabama	University Field; Tuscaloosa, AL	L 0–67	
October 22	at Southern (AL)	Greensboro, AL	W 26–7	
October 29	at Alabama Presbyterian	Anniston, AL	W 25–0	
November 6	vs. Howard (AL)	Rickwood Field; Birmingham, AL	T 6–6	
November 25	at Marion	Marion, AL	L 0–7	

== 1916 ==
1916 Birmingham Panthers football
- Conference: Independent
- Record: 7–1
- Head coach: Charles H. Brown (1st season)
- Home stadium: Munger Bowl

1916 Southern college football independents records
	Conf.			Overall
Team	W	L	T	W		L		T
Birmingham		–		7	–	1	–	0
Southwestern Louisiana Industrial		–		7	–	1	–	0
Maryland State		–		6	–	2	–	0
Marshall		–		7	–	2	–	1
Stetson		–		3	–	1	–	0
Middle Tennessee State Normal		–		5	–	2	–	0
Sam Houston Normal		–		5	–	2	–	0
Spring Hill		–		4	–	2	–	0
West Virginia		–		5	–	2	–	2
Navy		–		6	–	3	–	1
Southwest Texas State		–		3	–	1	–	3
Presbyterian		–		4	–	3	–	0
Delaware		–		4	–	3	–	1
North Texas State Normal		–		4	–	3	–	1
Western Kentucky State Normal		–		3	–	2	–	0
Wake Forest		–		3	–	3	–	0
Louisville		–		2	–	3	–	1
West Tennessee State Normal		–		2	–	3	–	1
Texas Mines		–		2	–	3	–	0
Tusculum		–		2	–	3	–	0
Cumberland (TN)		–		0	–	2	–	0

The 1916 Birmingham Panthers football team was an American football team that represented Birmingham College (now part of Birmingham–Southern College) as an independent during the 1916 college football season. Under head coach Charles H. Brown, the Panthers compiled a 7–1 record. The team's roster included Homer Norton at end and Peahead Walker at quarterback.

=== Schedule ===
Date	Opponent	Site	Result	Source
September 30	at Alabama	University Field; Tuscaloosa, AL	L 0–13	
October 13	at Marion	Marion, AL	W 7–6	
October 20	at Southwestern Presbyterian	Clarksville, TN	W 25–0	
October 26	at Spring Hill	Monroe Park; Mobile, AL	W 33–0	
November 3	Jacksonville State	Munger Bowl; Birmingham, AL	W 57–0	
November 17	Seventh District Agricultural (AL)	Munger Bowl; Birmingham, AL	W 64–0	
November 25	at Howard (AL)	Rickwood Field; Birmingham, AL	W 15–0	
November 30	at Southern (AL)	Greensboro, AL	W 42–0	

== 1917 ==
Birmingham College did not field a team for the 1917 college football season due to the impacts of World War I. At the time the season was canceled, they had a game scheduled against Alabama at University Field in Tuscaloosa on October 6.
