= S. R. Batson =

American engineer and athletics coach (1884–1961)

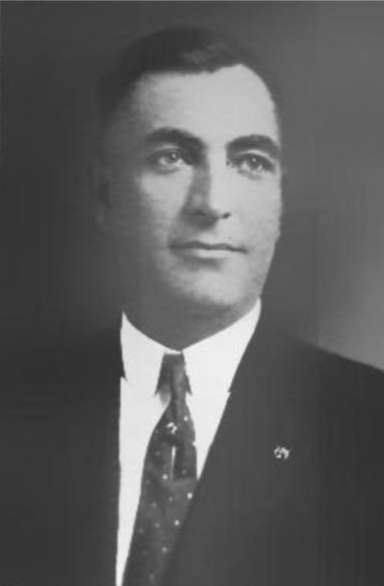
- S. R. Batson in 1922

Biographical details
- Born: November 1, 1884; Bessemer, Alabama, U.S.
- Died: November 26, 1961 (aged 77); Birmingham, Alabama, U.S.

Playing career

Football
- 1905–1907: Auburn

Baseball
- 1906–1908: Auburn
- Position: Center (football)

Coaching career (HC unless noted)

Football
- 1907: Auburn (co-freshmen)
- 1908: Birmingham

Basketball
- 1908–1909: Birmingham

Track and field
- 1909: Birmingham

Administrative career (AD unless noted)
- 1908–1909: Birmingham

Head coaching record
- Overall: 0–3–3 (football)

Stephen Radford Batson Sr. (November 1, 1884 – November 26, 1961) was an American civil engineer, college football, college basketball, college baseball, and track and field coach.

Batson was born on November 1, 1884, in Bessemer, Alabama. He attended Auburn University and played college football as a center. During his final year with Auburn he was the co-freshmen coach alongside J. G. Davis. He also played baseball. After leaving Auburn, he was the head of athletics at Birmingham College, a position he held for one year.

Batson spent most of his life working as an engineer, and operated Batson Construction Co. until his retirement in 1948. He is credited as the builder of the first mile of permanent highway in Alabama. He served as an engineer for state highways under governor Bibb Graves.

Batson died on November 26, 1861, at his home in Birmingham, Alabama.

== Head coaching record ==
=== Football ===
Year	Team	Overall	Conference	Standing	Bowl/playoffs
Birmingham (Independent) (1908)
1908	Birmingham	0–3–3			
Birmingham:		0–3–3			
Total:		0–3–3			
