= Luther Leonard =

American football coach and educator (1888–1937)

Biographical details
- Born: February 28, 1884; Springhills, Ohio, U.S.
- Died: December 10, 1959 (aged 75); Bucyrus, Ohio, U.S.
- Education: Yale University

Playing career

Football
- 1903–1906: Ohio Wesleyan
- Position: Center

Coaching career (HC unless noted)

Football
- 1907–1908: Hendrix
- 1909: Birmingham

Basketball
- 1907–1909: Hendrix
- 1909–1910: Birmingham

Baseball
- 1910: Hendrix

Track and field
- 1910: Birmingham

Administrative career (AD unless noted)
- 1909–1910: Birmingham

Head coaching record
- Overall: 8–9 (football)

Joy Luther Leonard (February 28, 1884 – December 10, 1959) was an American economist and college football, college basketball, college baseball, and track and field coach.

Leonard was born on February 28, 1884, to Joseph Leonard and Ella Carlo in Springhills, Ohio. He attended Bucyrus High School. He played college football for Ohio Wesleyan under Victor M. Place and Branch Rickey as a center. After his graduation he was hired as the head football, basketball, and baseball coach for Hendrix College. After two years he joined Birmingham College as the head of athletics.

After Leonard's coaching career ended he became a professor of economics at Wabash College. While at Wabash, he was the leader of a $2,000,000 fund backed by alumni. In 1928, he took a sabbatical from Wabash to work on his Doctor of Philosophy at Yale University. While at Yale he taught at Trinity College in Hartford, Connecticut. After completing his PhD he was hired as the head of the economics department for the University of Southern California. He held the position until his retirement.

In June 1916, Leonard married Vera Price, a librarian, in Columbus, Ohio. A year later, in 1917, they had their only son together. Leonard died on December 10, 1959, in Bucyrus, Ohio.

== Head coaching record ==
=== Football ===
Year	Team	Overall	Conference	Standing	Bowl/playoffs
Hendrix Bulldogs (Independent) (1907–1908)
1907	Hendrix	2–4			
1908	Hendrix	2–3			
Hendrix:		4–7			
Birmingham (Independent) (1909)
1909	Birmingham	4–2			
Birmingham:		4–2			
Total:		8–9			
