= Panthers Stadium =

Panther(s) Stadium may refer to:

- Panther Stadium, in Atlanta, Georgia, home of the Clark Atlanta University Panthers
- Panther Stadium (Birmingham–Southern), in Birmingham, Alabama, home of the Birmingham–Southern Panthers
- Panther Stadium at Blackshear Field, in Prairie View, Texas, home of the Prairie View A&M Panthers
- Panthers Stadium, the commercial name of Penrith Stadium, Sydney
- Bank of America Stadium, in Charlotte, North Carolina, home of the Carolina Panthers American football team
