= Wallace Pinson =

American football coach, player, and architect (1888–1937)

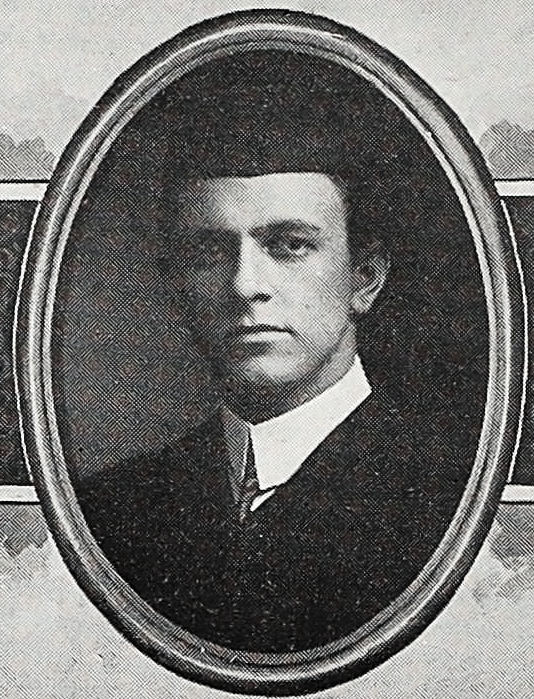
- Pinson in 1909

Biographical details
- Born: November 4, 1888; Austin, Texas, U.S.
- Died: March 6, 1937 (aged 48); Nashville, Tennessee, U.S.

Playing career

Football
- 1907–1908: Vanderbilt

Basketball
- 1907–1909: Vanderbilt

Baseball
- 1908–1909: Vanderbilt

Coaching career (HC unless noted)

Football
- 1909–1912: Hawkins HS (TN)
- 1913–1915: Birmingham

Basketball
- 1913–1916: Birmingham

Track and field
- 1913–1915: Birmingham

Administrative career (AD unless noted)
- 1913–1916: Birmingham

Head coaching record
- Overall: 5–8–2 (college football)

William Wallace Pinson Jr. (November 4, 1888 – March 6, 1937) was an American college football coach, player, and architect.

Pinson attended Vanderbilt University and participated in football, basketball, and baseball. After two years, he coached football for Hawkins High School. In 1913, he was hired as the head football coach for Birmingham College. In three years as head coach he led the team to an overall record of 5–8–2 .

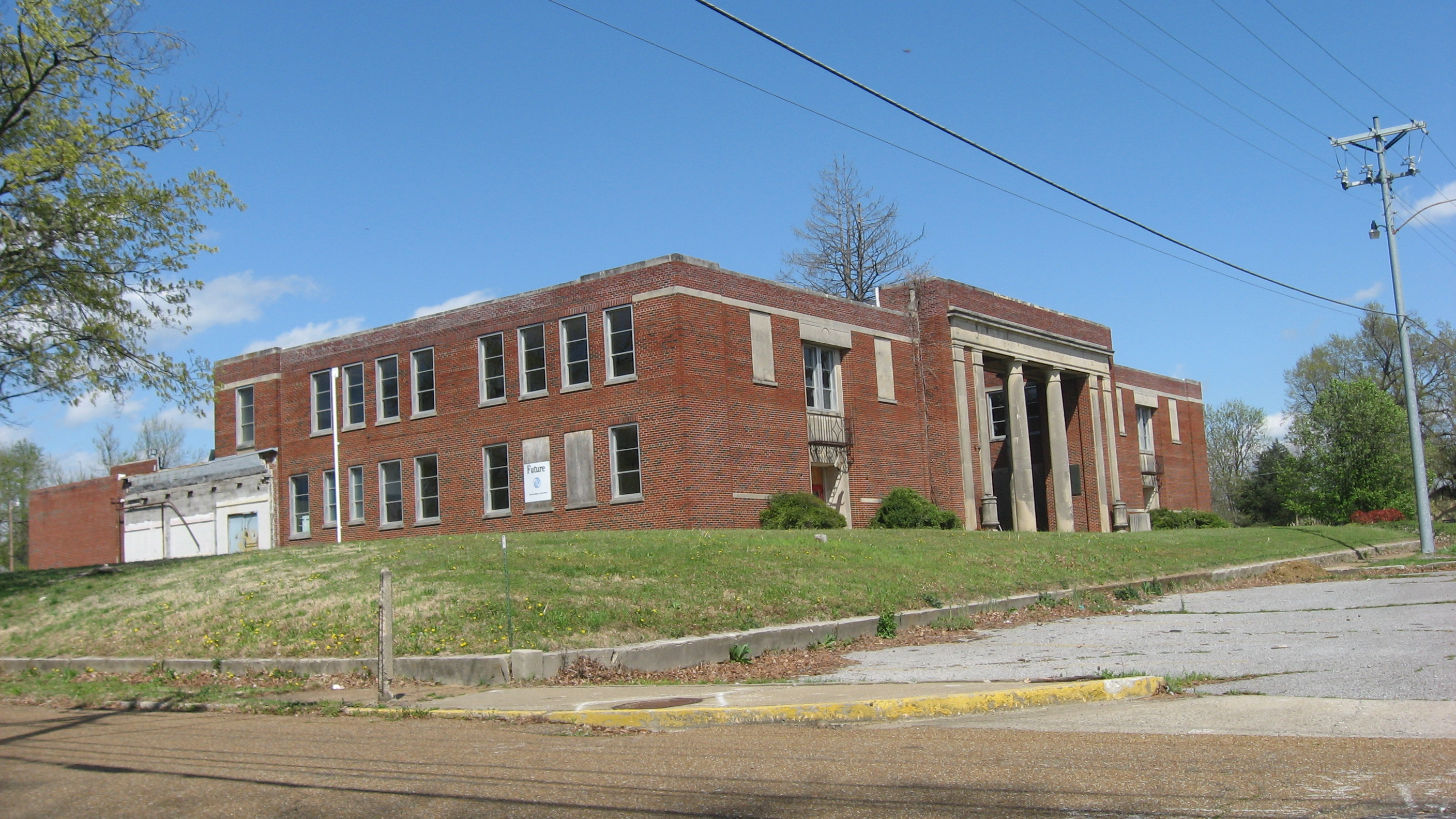
Central Elementary School in Union City, Tennessee

After coaching, Pinson worked as an architect. He married Marguerite Baker on November 20, 1914, at her parents home in Clarksville, Tennessee. Together they had four children. Sometime after 1920, Pinson moved his family to Nashville, Tennessee. While living in Nashville he worked for Tisdale and Pinson and designed the Central Elementary School in Union City, Tennessee, and Eakin Elementary School, both of which were on the National Register of Historic Places. He died of a heart attack on March 6, 1937, in his home in Nashville.

== Head coaching record ==
=== College football ===
Year	Team	Overall	Conference	Standing	Bowl/playoffs
Birmingham (Independent) (1913–1915)
1913	Birmingham	0–5			
1914	Birmingham	3–1–1			
1915	Birmingham	2–2–1			
Birmingham:		5–8–2			
Total:		5–8–2			
