= 1916 Spring Hill Badgers football team =

American college football season

1916 Spring Hill Badgers football
- Conference: Independent
- Record: 4–2
- Head coach: John O. Rush (1st season)
- Assistant coach: Baby Taylor
- Captain: Edward O'Dowd
- Home stadium: Monroe Park

1916 Southern college football independents records
| | Conf. | | | Overall |
| Team | W | L | T | W | | L | | T |
|---|---|---|---|---|---|---|---|---|
| Birmingham | | – | | 7 | – | 1 | – | 0 |
| Southwestern Louisiana Industrial | | – | | 7 | – | 1 | – | 0 |
| Maryland State | | – | | 6 | – | 2 | – | 0 |
| Marshall | | – | | 7 | – | 2 | – | 1 |
| Stetson | | – | | 3 | – | 1 | – | 0 |
| Middle Tennessee State Normal | | – | | 5 | – | 2 | – | 0 |
| Sam Houston Normal | | – | | 5 | – | 2 | – | 0 |
| Spring Hill | | – | | 4 | – | 2 | – | 0 |
| West Virginia | | – | | 5 | – | 2 | – | 2 |
| Navy | | – | | 6 | – | 3 | – | 1 |
| Southwest Texas State | | – | | 3 | – | 1 | – | 3 |
| Presbyterian | | – | | 4 | – | 3 | – | 0 |
| Delaware | | – | | 4 | – | 3 | – | 1 |
| North Texas State Normal | | – | | 4 | – | 3 | – | 1 |
| Western Kentucky State Normal | | – | | 3 | – | 2 | – | 0 |
| Wake Forest | | – | | 3 | – | 3 | – | 0 |
| Louisville | | – | | 2 | – | 3 | – | 1 |
| West Tennessee State Normal | | – | | 2 | – | 3 | – | 1 |
| Texas Mines | | – | | 2 | – | 3 | – | 0 |
| Tusculum | | – | | 2 | – | 3 | – | 0 |
| Cumberland (TN) | | – | | 0 | – | 2 | – | 0 |

The 1916 Spring Hill Badgers football team represented the Spring Hill College as an independent during the 1916 college football season.

== Schedule ==
| Date | Opponent | Site | Result | Source |
|---|---|---|---|---|
| October 7 | Gulf Coast Military Academy | Monroe Park; Mobile, AL | W 53–0 | |
| October 14 | at Tulane | Tulane Stadium; New Orleans, LA | L 0–14 | |
| October 26 | Birmingham | Monroe Park; Mobile, AL | L 0–33 | |
| November 11 | Mississippi Normal | Monroe Park; Mobile, AL | W 86–0 | |
| November 18 | Southern | Monroe Park; Mobile, AL | W 57–6 | |
| November 30 | Howard (AL) | Monroe Park; Mobile, AL | W 32–0 | |
