= 1916 Transylvania Crimsons football team =

American college football season

1916 Transylvania Crimsons football
- Conference: Southern Intercollegiate Athletic Association
- Record: 3–3–2 (2–3–1 SIAA)
- Head coach: Willis T. Stewart (4th season)
- Home stadium: Thomas Field

1916 Southern Intercollegiate Athletic Association football standings
	Conf.					Overall
Team	W		L		T	W		L		T
Georgia Tech +	5	–	0	–	0	8	–	0	–	1
Tennessee +	6	–	0	–	1	8	–	0	–	1
Vanderbilt	4	–	1	–	1	7	–	1	–	1
LSU	3	–	1	–	1	7	–	1	–	2
The Citadel	3	–	1	–	0	6	–	1	–	1
Tulane	2	–	1	–	1	4	–	3	–	1
Kentucky	2	–	1	–	2	4	–	1	–	2
Auburn	6	–	2	–	0	6	–	2	–	0
Georgia	5	–	2	–	0	6	–	3	–	0
Alabama	4	–	3	–	0	6	–	3	–	0
Sewanee	2	–	2	–	2	5	–	2	–	2
Centre	1	–	1	–	1	5	–	1	–	3
Howard (AL)	1	–	1	–	0	6	–	4	–	0
Georgetown (KY)	1	–	1	–	0	2	–	1	–	0
Mississippi A&M	3	–	4	–	0	4	–	4	–	1
Transylvania	2	–	3	–	1	3	–	3	–	2
Mississippi College	2	–	3	–	0	6	–	3	–	0
Clemson	2	–	4	–	0	3	–	6	–	0
South Carolina	2	–	4	–	0	2	–	7	–	0
Wofford	1	–	2	–	0	2	–	7	–	0
Louisville	1	–	2	–	1	2	–	3	–	1
Furman	1	–	3	–	0	4	–	5	–	0
Chattanooga	1	–	4	–	0	3	–	5	–	0
Florida	0	–	4	–	0	0	–	5	–	0
Mercer	0	–	5	–	0	1	–	6	–	0
Ole Miss	0	–	6	–	0	3	–	6	–	0
+ – Conference co-champions

The 1916 Transylvania Crimsons football team represented Transylvania University as a member the Southern Intercollegiate Athletic Association (SIAA) during the 1916 college football season. Led by fourth-year head coach Willis T. Stewart, the team compiled an overall record of 3–3–2, with a mark of 2–3–1 in conference play.

== Schedule ==
Date	Opponent	Site	Result	Source
September 29	Hanover*	Thomas Field; Lexington, KY	W 44–7	
October 7	at Vanderbilt	Dudley Field; Nashville, TN	L 0–42	
October 21	at Mississippi A&M	New Athletic Field; Starkville, MS	L 0–13	
October 28	Marshall*	Thomas Field; Lexington, KY	T 19–19	
November 11	Ole Miss	Thomas Field; Lexington, KY	W 13–3	
November 17	at Centre	Cheek Field; Danville, KY	T 0–0	
November 23	Georgetown (KY)	Stoll Field; Lexington, KY	L 2–12	
November 30	Louisville	Thomas Field; Lexington, KY	W 13–0	
*Non-conference game
