= G. M. Billings =

American football and baseball player and coach, otolaryngologist

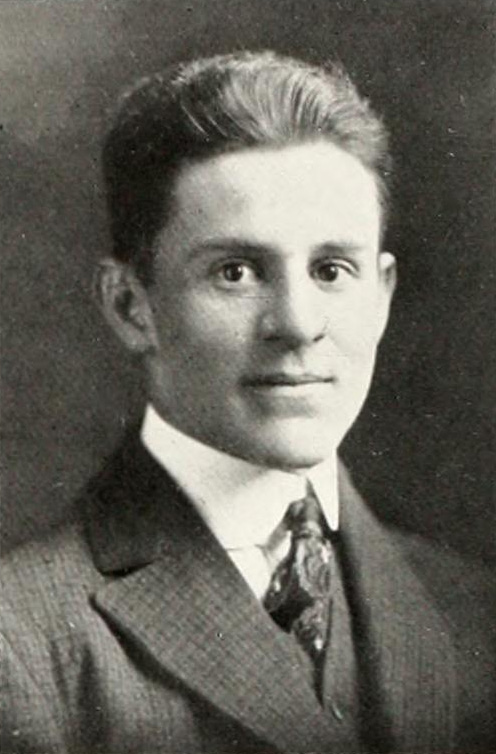
- Billings pictured in The Howler 1917, Wake Forest yearbook

Biographical details
- Born: March 22, 1890; Raleigh, North Carolina, U.S.
- Died: January 24, 1970 (aged 79); Morganton, North Carolina, U.S.

Playing career

Football
- 1911–1914: Wake Forest

Baseball
- 1912–1915: Wake Forest

Coaching career (HC unless noted)

Football
- 1916: Wake Forest

Baseball
- 1916–1917: Wake Forest

Head coaching record
- Overall: 3–3 (football); 18–17–1 (baseball)

Gilbert Miggins "Mig" Billings (March 22, 1890 – January 24, 1970) was an American college football and college baseball player and coach and otolaryngologist. He served as the head football coach at Wake Forest University in 1916, compiling a record of 3–3. Billings was also the head baseball coach at Wake Forest from 1916 to 1917, tallying a mark of 18–17–1.

== Head coaching record ==
=== Football ===
Year	Team	Overall	Conference	Standing	Bowl/playoffs
Wake Forest Baptists (Independent) (1916)
1916	Wake Forest	3–3			
Wake Forest:		3–3			
Total:		3–3			
