= Will Duffy =

American football player and coach (1888–1953)

Biographical details
- Born: November 24, 1888; Louisville, Kentucky, U.S.
- Died: May 17, 1953 (aged 64); Buechel, Kentucky, U.S.

Playing career
- 1908–1910: Central University

Coaching career (HC unless noted)
- 1911–1914: Louisville Male HS (KY)
- 1915–1916: Louisville

Head coaching record
- Overall: 3–8–2 (college)

William Michael Duffy (November 24, 1888 – May 17, 1953) was an American football player and coach. He served as the head football coach at the University of Louisville from 1915 to 1916, compiling a record of 3–8–2. Duffy died of a heart attack on May 17, 1953, while making a speech at St. Bartholomew Church in Buechel, Louisville.

== Head coaching record ==
=== College ===
Year	Team	Overall	Conference	Standing	Bowl/playoffs
Louisville Cardinals (Independent) (1915–1916)
1915	Louisville	1–5–1			
1916	Louisville	2–3–1			
Louisville:		3–8–2			
Total:		3–8–2			
