= Eddie Garfinkle =

American football coach

Playing career
- 1977–1980: Jacksonville State
- Position: Linebacker

Coaching career (HC unless noted)
- 1980–1981: Jacksonville State (SA/GA)
- 1982–1985: Jacksonville State (DE/DL)
- 1986–1991: Jacksonville State (DC)
- 1992–1996: Georgia Southern (LB)
- 2002–2006: Spain Park HS (AL) (DC)
- 2007–2008: Birmingham–Southern (DC)
- 2008–2016: Birmingham–Southern
- 2018-2020: Gulf Shores HS (AL) (DC)

Head coaching record
- Overall: 41–46

Eddie Garfinkle is an American football coach. He served as the head football coach at Birmingham–Southern College in Birmingham, Alabama from 2008 to 2016. He previously served as a defensive coordinator at both Jacksonville State University and Georgia Southern University, assistant coach at Spain Park High School and defensive coordinator at Birmingham–Southern College. Garfinkle was hired as Birmingham Southern's sixth head coach on February 20, 2008. On October 24, 2016, it was announced that Garfinkle would not return after the 2016 season. Garfinkle served as the Gulf Shores High School defensive coordinator from 2018 to 2020.

== Head coaching record ==
Year	Team	Overall	Conference	Standing	Bowl/playoffs
Birmingham–Southern Panthers (Southern Collegiate Athletic Conference) (2008–2011)
2008	Birmingham–Southern	3–7	2–6		
2009	Birmingham–Southern	4–6	3–4		
2010	Birmingham–Southern	6–4	3–4		
2011	Birmingham–Southern	7–2	4–2		
Birmingham–Southern Panthers (Southern Athletic Association) (2012–present)
2012	Birmingham–Southern	7–3	3–1	T–1st	
2013	Birmingham–Southern	5–4	3–3	T–4th	
2014	Birmingham–Southern	3–7	3–3	T–3rd	
2015	Birmingham–Southern	5–5	3–5	6th	
2016	Birmingham–Southern	1–9	1–7	8th	
Birmingham–Southern:		41–47	25–34		
Total:		41–46			
National championship Conference title Conference division title or championship game berth
