= Anthony Colucci =

American football coach (born c. 1991)

Current position
- Title: Head coach
- Team: Saint Charles Preparatory (OH)
- Record: 4–7

Biographical details
- Born: c. 1991 (age 34–35); Ashtabula, Ohio, U.S.
- Education: Capital University (2014)

Playing career
- 2010–2013: Capital
- Position: Guard

Coaching career (HC unless noted)
- 2014–2015: Centre (TE)
- 2016: Centre (OL)
- 2017–2022: Birmingham–Southern (OC)
- 2023: Birmingham–Southern
- 2024–present: Saint Charles Preparatory (OH)

Head coaching record
- Overall: 3–7 (college); 4–7 (high school)

Anthony Colucci (born c. 1991) is an American college football coach. He is the head football coach for Saint Charles Preparatory School, a position he has held since 2024. He was the head football coach for Birmingham–Southern College from 2023 until the school closed in spring 2024. He also coached for Centre. He played college football for Capital as a guard, starting three years on the offensive line while studying nursing.

He and his wife Chelsea have one son.

== Head coaching record ==
=== College ===
Year	Team	Overall	Conference	Standing	Bowl/playoffs
Birmingham–Southern Panthers (Southern Athletic Association) (2023)
2023	Birmingham–Southern	3–7	2–6	T–7th	
Birmingham–Southern:		3–7	2–6		
Total:		3–7			

=== High school ===
Year	Team	Overall	Conference	Standing	Bowl/playoffs
Saint Charles Prep Cardinals () (2024–present)
2024	Saint Charles Prep	4–7	0–3	4th	
Saint Charles Prep:		4–7	0–3		
Total:		4–7			
