= 1916 Louisville Cardinals football team =

American college football season

1916 Louisville Cardinals football
- Conference: Independent
- Record: 2–3–1
- Head coach: Will Duffy (2nd season)
- Home stadium: Eclipse Park

1916 Southern college football independents records
	Conf.			Overall
Team	W	L	T	W		L		T
Birmingham		–		7	–	1	–	0
Southwestern Louisiana Industrial		–		7	–	1	–	0
Maryland State		–		6	–	2	–	0
Marshall		–		7	–	2	–	1
Stetson		–		3	–	1	–	0
Middle Tennessee State Normal		–		5	–	2	–	0
Sam Houston Normal		–		5	–	2	–	0
Spring Hill		–		4	–	2	–	0
West Virginia		–		5	–	2	–	2
Navy		–		6	–	3	–	1
Southwest Texas State		–		3	–	1	–	3
Presbyterian		–		4	–	3	–	0
Delaware		–		4	–	3	–	1
North Texas State Normal		–		4	–	3	–	1
Western Kentucky State Normal		–		3	–	2	–	0
Wake Forest		–		3	–	3	–	0
Louisville		–		2	–	3	–	1
West Tennessee State Normal		–		2	–	3	–	1
Texas Mines		–		2	–	3	–	0
Tusculum		–		2	–	3	–	0
Cumberland (TN)		–		0	–	2	–	0

The 1916 Louisville Cardinals football team was an American football team that represented the University of Louisville as an independent during the 1916 college football season. In their second and final season under head coach Will Duffy, the Cardinals compiled a 2–3–1 record. The team played its home games at Eclipse Park in Louisville, Kentucky.

== Schedule ==
Date	Opponent	Site	Result	Source
October 14	Centre	Eclipse Park; Louisville, KY	T 0–0	
October 21	Chattanooga	Eclipse Park; Louisville, KY	W 6–0	
October 28	Butler	Eclipse Park; Louisville, KY	W 19–7	
November 4	Georgetown (KY)	Eclipse Park; Louisville, KY	L 0–41	
November 18	Franklin (IN)	Eclipse Park; Louisville, KY	L 12–16	
November 30	at Transylvania	Lexington, KY	L 0–13	
