= 1916 Southwest Texas State football team =

American college football season

1916 Southwest Texas State football
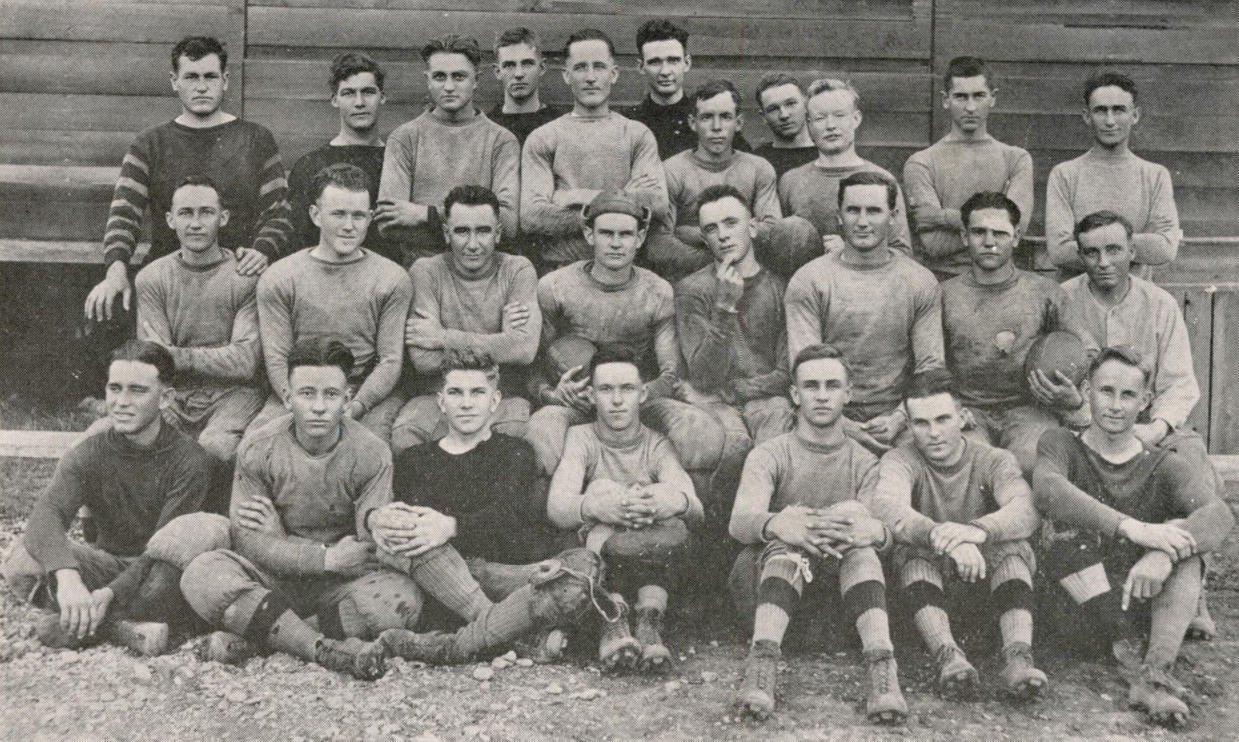
- Conference: Independent
- Record: 3–1–3
- Head coach: G. B. Marsh (1st season)
- Captain: H. A. Chapman
- Home stadium: Evans Field

1916 Southern college football independents records
| | Conf. | | | Overall |
| Team | W | L | T | W | | L | | T |
|---|---|---|---|---|---|---|---|---|
| Birmingham | | – | | 7 | – | 1 | – | 0 |
| Southwestern Louisiana Industrial | | – | | 7 | – | 1 | – | 0 |
| Maryland State | | – | | 6 | – | 2 | – | 0 |
| Marshall | | – | | 7 | – | 2 | – | 1 |
| Stetson | | – | | 3 | – | 1 | – | 0 |
| Middle Tennessee State Normal | | – | | 5 | – | 2 | – | 0 |
| Sam Houston Normal | | – | | 5 | – | 2 | – | 0 |
| Spring Hill | | – | | 4 | – | 2 | – | 0 |
| West Virginia | | – | | 5 | – | 2 | – | 2 |
| Navy | | – | | 6 | – | 3 | – | 1 |
| Southwest Texas State | | – | | 3 | – | 1 | – | 3 |
| Presbyterian | | – | | 4 | – | 3 | – | 0 |
| Delaware | | – | | 4 | – | 3 | – | 1 |
| North Texas State Normal | | – | | 4 | – | 3 | – | 1 |
| Western Kentucky State Normal | | – | | 3 | – | 2 | – | 0 |
| Wake Forest | | – | | 3 | – | 3 | – | 0 |
| Louisville | | – | | 2 | – | 3 | – | 1 |
| West Tennessee State Normal | | – | | 2 | – | 3 | – | 1 |
| Texas Mines | | – | | 2 | – | 3 | – | 0 |
| Tusculum | | – | | 2 | – | 3 | – | 0 |
| Cumberland (TN) | | – | | 0 | – | 2 | – | 0 |

The 1916 Southwest Texas State football team was an American football team that represented Southwest Texas State Normal School—now known as Texas State University–as an independent during the 1916 college football season. Led by first-year head coach G. B. Marsh, the team finished the season with a record of 3–1–3. The team's captain was H. A. Chapman, who played halfback.

== Schedule ==
| Date | Opponent | Site | Result | Source |
|---|---|---|---|---|
| October 9 | Coronal Institute | | W 6–0 | |
| October 16 | San Marcos Baptist Academy | | T 0–0 | |
| October 25 | St. Edward's | | W 47–6 | |
| November 6 | North Texas State Normal | Evans Field; San Marcos, TX | T 0–0 | |
| November 13 | San Marcos Baptist Academy | | W 7–0 | |
| November 20 | at Sam Houston Normal | Pritchett Field; Huntsville, TX (rivalry) | L 0–61 | |
| November 29 | Southwestern (TX) JV | | T 6–6 | |
