= 1916 Maryland State Aggies football team =

American college football season

1916 Maryland State Aggies football
- Conference: Independent
- Record: 6–2
- Head coach: Curley Byrd (6th season)
- Captain: Lyman Oberlin

1916 Southern college football independents records
	Conf.			Overall
Team	W	L	T	W		L		T
Birmingham		–		7	–	1	–	0
Southwestern Louisiana Industrial		–		7	–	1	–	0
Maryland State		–		6	–	2	–	0
Marshall		–		7	–	2	–	1
Stetson		–		3	–	1	–	0
Middle Tennessee State Normal		–		5	–	2	–	0
Sam Houston Normal		–		5	–	2	–	0
Spring Hill		–		4	–	2	–	0
West Virginia		–		5	–	2	–	2
Navy		–		6	–	3	–	1
Southwest Texas State		–		3	–	1	–	3
Presbyterian		–		4	–	3	–	0
Delaware		–		4	–	3	–	1
North Texas State Normal		–		4	–	3	–	1
Western Kentucky State Normal		–		3	–	2	–	0
George Washington		–		3	–	3	–	1
Wake Forest		–		3	–	3	–	0
Louisville		–		2	–	3	–	1
West Tennessee State Normal		–		2	–	3	–	1
Texas Mines		–		2	–	3	–	0
Tusculum		–		2	–	3	–	0
Cumberland (TN)		–		0	–	2	–	0

The 1916 Maryland State Aggies football team was an American football team that represented Maryland State College (which in 1920 became part of the University of Maryland) in the 1916 college football season. In their sixth season under head coach Curley Byrd, the Aggies compiled a 6–2 record and outscored opponents by a total of 142 to 52. The team's victories included games against VMI (15–9), St. John's College (31–6), Catholic University (13–9), and Johns Hopkins (54–0). Its two losses were to Navy (7–14) and Haverford (6–7).

Lyman Oberlin was the team captain.

== Schedule ==
Date	Time	Opponent	Site	Result	Attendance	Source
September 23		Baltimore Polytechnic		Cancelled		
October 6		Dickinson	College Park, MD	W 6–0		
October 11		at Navy	Worden Field; Annapolis, MD (rivalry)	L 7–14		
October 21		VMI	College Park, MD	W 15–9		
October 28		Haverford	College Park, MD	L 6–7		
November 4	10:30 a.m.	at St. John's (MD)	Annapolis, MD	W 31–6		
November 11		at Catholic University	Brookland Field; Washington, DC	W 13–9		
November 18		at NYU	Ohio Field; Bronx, NY	W 10–7		
November 30		at Johns Hopkins	Homewood Field; Baltimore, MD	W 54–0		
