= 1916 Presbyterian Blue Hose football team =

American college football season

1916 Presbyterian Blue Hose football
- Conference: Independent
- Record: 4–3
- Head coach: Walter A. Johnson (2nd season)
- Captain: A. P. McFie

1916 Southern college football independents records
	Conf.			Overall
Team	W	L	T	W		L		T
Birmingham		–		7	–	1	–	0
Southwestern Louisiana Industrial		–		7	–	1	–	0
Maryland State		–		6	–	2	–	0
Marshall		–		7	–	2	–	1
Stetson		–		3	–	1	–	0
Middle Tennessee State Normal		–		5	–	2	–	0
Sam Houston Normal		–		5	–	2	–	0
Spring Hill		–		4	–	2	–	0
West Virginia		–		5	–	2	–	2
Navy		–		6	–	3	–	1
Southwest Texas State		–		3	–	1	–	3
Presbyterian		–		4	–	3	–	0
Delaware		–		4	–	3	–	1
North Texas State Normal		–		4	–	3	–	1
Western Kentucky State Normal		–		3	–	2	–	0
Wake Forest		–		3	–	3	–	0
Louisville		–		2	–	3	–	1
West Tennessee State Normal		–		2	–	3	–	1
Texas Mines		–		2	–	3	–	0
Tusculum		–		2	–	3	–	0
Cumberland (TN)		–		0	–	2	–	0

The 1916 Presbyterian Blue Hose football team represented Presbyterian College as an independent during the 1916 college football season. Led by the second-year head coach Walter A. Johnson, Presbyterian compiled a record of 4–3. The team captain was A. P. McFie.

== Schedule ==
Date	Opponent	Site	Result	Source
September 29	Bailey Military Institute	Clinton, SC	W 32–6	
October 6	Wofford	Clinton, SC	W 49–13	
October 14	at The Citadel	Greenville, SC	L 7–34	
October 27	Furman	Clinton, SC	L 10–42	
November 10	at Erskine	Due West, SC	W 34–3	
November 23	at Clemson	Riggs Field; Calhoun, SC	L 0–40	
November 30	at Newberry	Newberry, SC	W 3–0	
