= 1916 Tusculum Pioneers football team =

American college football season

1916 Tusculum Pioneers football
- Conference: Independent
- Record: 2–3
- Head coach: J. Bruce Anderson (2nd season)

1916 Southern college football independents records
	Conf.			Overall
Team	W	L	T	W		L		T
Birmingham		–		7	–	1	–	0
Southwestern Louisiana Industrial		–		7	–	1	–	0
Maryland State		–		6	–	2	–	0
Marshall		–		7	–	2	–	1
Stetson		–		3	–	1	–	0
Middle Tennessee State Normal		–		5	–	2	–	0
Sam Houston Normal		–		5	–	2	–	0
Spring Hill		–		4	–	2	–	0
West Virginia		–		5	–	2	–	2
Navy		–		6	–	3	–	1
Southwest Texas State		–		3	–	1	–	3
Presbyterian		–		4	–	3	–	0
Delaware		–		4	–	3	–	1
North Texas State Normal		–		4	–	3	–	1
Western Kentucky State Normal		–		3	–	2	–	0
Wake Forest		–		3	–	3	–	0
Louisville		–		2	–	3	–	1
West Tennessee State Normal		–		2	–	3	–	1
Texas Mines		–		2	–	3	–	0
Tusculum		–		2	–	3	–	0
Cumberland (TN)		–		0	–	2	–	0

The 1916 Tusculum Pioneers football team represented Tusculum College during the 1916 college football season. The team was led by head coach J. Bruce Anderson. The team's first game of the season was a loss to future SIAA champion Tennessee.

== Schedule ==
Date	Opponent	Site	Result
September 30	at Tennessee	Waite Field; Knoxville, TN	L 0–33
October 7	at Emory and Henry	Emory, VA	L 0–35
October 14	vs. Maryville (TN)	Greeneville, TN	L 0–20
October 21	vs. Carson–Newman	Morristown, TN	W 12–6
	TN Wesleyan	?	W 13–7
