= 1916 Cumberland Bulldogs football team =

American college football season

1916 Cumberland Bulldogs football
- Conference: Independent
- Record: 0–2
- Head coach: George E. Allen (1st season)

1916 Southern college football independents records
	Conf.			Overall
Team	W	L	T	W		L		T
Birmingham		–		7	–	1	–	0
Southwestern Louisiana Industrial		–		7	–	1	–	0
Maryland State		–		6	–	2	–	0
Marshall		–		7	–	2	–	1
Stetson		–		3	–	1	–	0
Middle Tennessee State Normal		–		5	–	2	–	0
Sam Houston Normal		–		5	–	2	–	0
Spring Hill		–		4	–	2	–	0
West Virginia		–		5	–	2	–	2
Navy		–		6	–	3	–	1
Southwest Texas State		–		3	–	1	–	3
Presbyterian		–		4	–	3	–	0
Delaware		–		4	–	3	–	1
North Texas State Normal		–		4	–	3	–	1
Western Kentucky State Normal		–		3	–	2	–	0
Wake Forest		–		3	–	3	–	0
Louisville		–		2	–	3	–	1
West Tennessee State Normal		–		2	–	3	–	1
Texas Mines		–		2	–	3	–	0
Tusculum		–		2	–	3	–	0
Cumberland (TN)		–		0	–	2	–	0

The 1916 Cumberland Bulldogs football team represented Cumberland University as an independent during the 1916 college football season. Led by George E. Allen in his first and only season as head coach, Cumberland compiled an overall record of 0–2 with two insurmountable losses to Sewanee and Georgia Tech respectively.

== 222-0 game ==
On October 7, 1916, the Bulldogs were blown out 222-0 by the Georgia Tech Yellow Jackets, making it the most lopsided gamed in college football history.

== Schedule ==
Date	Opponent	Site	Result	Source
September 30	at Sewanee	Hardee Field; Sewanee, TN	L 0–107	
October 3	at Georgia Tech	Grant Field; Atlanta, GA	L 0–222	
