= 1916 Southwestern Louisiana Industrial football team =

American college football season

1916 Southwestern Louisiana Industrial football
- Conference: Independent
- Record: 7–1
- Head coach: T. R. Mobley (1st season)
- Home stadium: Campus Athletic Field

1916 Southern college football independents records
| | Conf. | | | Overall |
| Team | W | L | T | W | | L | | T |
|---|---|---|---|---|---|---|---|---|
| Birmingham | | – | | 7 | – | 1 | – | 0 |
| Southwestern Louisiana Industrial | | – | | 7 | – | 1 | – | 0 |
| Maryland State | | – | | 6 | – | 2 | – | 0 |
| Marshall | | – | | 7 | – | 2 | – | 1 |
| Stetson | | – | | 3 | – | 1 | – | 0 |
| Middle Tennessee State Normal | | – | | 5 | – | 2 | – | 0 |
| Sam Houston Normal | | – | | 5 | – | 2 | – | 0 |
| Spring Hill | | – | | 4 | – | 2 | – | 0 |
| West Virginia | | – | | 5 | – | 2 | – | 2 |
| Navy | | – | | 6 | – | 3 | – | 1 |
| Southwest Texas State | | – | | 3 | – | 1 | – | 3 |
| Presbyterian | | – | | 4 | – | 3 | – | 0 |
| Delaware | | – | | 4 | – | 3 | – | 1 |
| North Texas State Normal | | – | | 4 | – | 3 | – | 1 |
| Western Kentucky State Normal | | – | | 3 | – | 2 | – | 0 |
| Wake Forest | | – | | 3 | – | 3 | – | 0 |
| Louisville | | – | | 2 | – | 3 | – | 1 |
| West Tennessee State Normal | | – | | 2 | – | 3 | – | 1 |
| Texas Mines | | – | | 2 | – | 3 | – | 0 |
| Tusculum | | – | | 2 | – | 3 | – | 0 |
| Cumberland (TN) | | – | | 0 | – | 2 | – | 0 |

The 1916 Southwestern Louisiana Industrial football team was an American football team that represented the Southwestern Louisiana Industrial Institute (now known as the University of Louisiana at Lafayette) as an independent during the 1916 college football season. In their first year under head coach T. R. Mobley, the team compiled a 7–1 record.

== Schedule ==
| Date | Opponent | Site | Result | Attendance | Source |
|---|---|---|---|---|---|
| September 30 | LSU | Lafayette, LA | L 0–24 | | |
| October 7 | LSU JV | Lafayette, LA | W 6–0 | | |
| October 14 | Louisiana College | Lafayette, LA | W 65–0 | | |
| October 21 | St. Charles (LA) | Lafayette, LA | W 95–0 | | |
| November 4 | Tulane JV | Lafayette, LA | W 14–0 | | |
| November 14 | at Louisiana Industrial | Ruston, LA (rivalry) | W 26–0 | | |
| November 25 | Jefferson College (LA) | Lafayette, LA | W 12–6 | | |
| November 30 | Louisiana Normal | Campus Athletic Field; Lafayette, LA | W 20–0 | | |
