= 1916 North Texas State Normal football team =

American college football season

1916 North Texas State Normal football
- Conference: Independent
- Record: 4–3–1
- Head coach: James W. St. Clair (2nd season)
- Home stadium: Eagle Field

1916 Southern college football independents records
	Conf.			Overall
Team	W	L	T	W		L		T
Birmingham		–		7	–	1	–	0
Southwestern Louisiana Industrial		–		7	–	1	–	0
Maryland State		–		6	–	2	–	0
Marshall		–		7	–	2	–	1
Stetson		–		3	–	1	–	0
Middle Tennessee State Normal		–		5	–	2	–	0
Sam Houston Normal		–		5	–	2	–	0
Spring Hill		–		4	–	2	–	0
West Virginia		–		5	–	2	–	2
Navy		–		6	–	3	–	1
Southwest Texas State		–		3	–	1	–	3
Presbyterian		–		4	–	3	–	0
Delaware		–		4	–	3	–	1
North Texas State Normal		–		4	–	3	–	1
Western Kentucky State Normal		–		3	–	2	–	0
Wake Forest		–		3	–	3	–	0
Louisville		–		2	–	3	–	1
West Tennessee State Normal		–		2	–	3	–	1
Texas Mines		–		2	–	3	–	0
Tusculum		–		2	–	3	–	0
Cumberland (TN)		–		0	–	2	–	0

The 1916 North Texas State Normal football team represented North Texas State Normal College (now known as the University of North Texas) as an independent during the 1916 college football season. Led by second-year head coach James W. St. Clair, the squad compiled an overall record of 4–3–1.

== Schedule ==
Date	Opponent	Site	Result	Source
October 7	Southeastern Oklahoma Normal	Eagle Field; Denton, TX	W 6–0	
October 13	at Decatur Baptist	Decatur, TX	W 12–0	
October 20	at Dallas	Dallas, TX	L 0–42	
October 31	at Trinity (TX)	Yoakum Field; Waxahachie, TX	L 7–12	
November 6	at Southwest Texas State	Evans Field; San Marcos, TX	T 0–0	
November 13	Thorp Spring College	Eagle Field; Denton, TX	W 48–0	
November 20	Meridian College	Eagle Field; Denton, TX	L 13–14	
November 30	East Texas State	Eagle Field; Denton, TX	W 38–7	
