= 1916 Middle Tennessee State Normal football team =

American college football season

1916 Middle Tennessee State Normal football
- Conference: Independent
- Record: 5–2
- Head coach: Alfred B. Miles (4th season)
- Captain: Cass Miles

1916 Southern college football independents records
	Conf.			Overall
Team	W	L	T	W		L		T
Birmingham		–		7	–	1	–	0
Southwestern Louisiana Industrial		–		7	–	1	–	0
Maryland State		–		6	–	2	–	0
Marshall		–		7	–	2	–	1
Stetson		–		3	–	1	–	0
Middle Tennessee State Normal		–		5	–	2	–	0
Sam Houston Normal		–		5	–	2	–	0
Spring Hill		–		4	–	2	–	0
West Virginia		–		5	–	2	–	2
Navy		–		6	–	3	–	1
Southwest Texas State		–		3	–	1	–	3
Presbyterian		–		4	–	3	–	0
Delaware		–		4	–	3	–	1
North Texas State Normal		–		4	–	3	–	1
Western Kentucky State Normal		–		3	–	2	–	0
Wake Forest		–		3	–	3	–	0
Louisville		–		2	–	3	–	1
West Tennessee State Normal		–		2	–	3	–	1
Texas Mines		–		2	–	3	–	0
Tusculum		–		2	–	3	–	0
Cumberland (TN)		–		0	–	2	–	0

The 1916 Middle Tennessee State Normal football team represented the Middle Tennessee State Normal School (now known as Middle Tennessee State University) during the 1916 college football season. The team captain was Cass Miles.

== Schedule ==
Date	Opponent	Site	Result	Source
September 30	at Chattanooga	Chamberlain Field; Chattanooga, TN	L 6–20	
October 7	Sewanee reserves	Anderson field; Murfreesboro, TN	L 0–7	
October 13	at Southwestern Presbyterian	Clarksville, TN	W 6–0	
October 21	Castle Heights Military Academy	Normal field; Murfreesboro, TN	W 20–0	
October 28	Cumberland (TN)	Murfreesboro, TN	W 49–0	
November 4	Chattanooga Central High School	Murfreesboro, TN	W 14–0	
November 11	Vanderbilt B team	Mursfreesboro, TN	W 14–0	
