= General Krulak Stadium =

Stadium in Birmingham, Alabama

Coordinates: 33.51549°N 86.85531°W

General Charles C. Krulak Stadium
- Interactive map of General Charles C. Krulak Stadium
- Location: BSC Campus; Birmingham, AL
- Owner: Birmingham–Southern College
- Operator: Birmingham–Southern College
- Capacity: 1,600

Construction
- Opened: November 8, 2008

Tenant
- Birmingham–Southern Panthers

General Charles C. Krulak Stadium is located in Birmingham, Alabama, and served as the home stadium for the Birmingham–Southern Panthers football, lacrosse, cross country, and track and field teams. The stadium has a maximum seating capacity of 1,600, and opened for the homecoming football game against Sewanee on November 8, 2008 as Panther Stadium. The 49–0 Panthers victory saw an overflow crowd of 3,575 in attendance. In 2015, the stadium was renamed to its current name after General Charles C. Krulak.

Panther Stadium serves as a replacement for the Munger Bowl, which was located on-campus and subsequently demolished in the 1960s to make way for campus expansion.
