= Robert Selph Henry =

American lawyer, railroad executive and historian

- Born: October 20, 1889; Clifton, Tennessee, U.S.
- Died: August 19, 1970 (aged 80); Alexandria, Virginia, U.S.
- Education: Vanderbilt University
- Occupations: Lawyer, businessman, historian

Colonel Robert Selph Henry (October 20, 1889 – August 19, 1970) was an American lawyer, railroad executive and historian. He was an executive of the Nashville, Chattanooga and St. Louis Railway from 1921 to 1934, and the vice president of the Association of American Railroads from 1934 to 1958. He was the author of several books about the history of the Southern United States, including the American Civil War and the Mexican–American War, as well as railroads. He was the 1957 president of the Southern Historical Association. A veteran of World War I, he was a reservist until his 1952 retirement as a colonel.

== Early life ==
Robert Selph Henry was born on October 20, 1889, in Clifton, Tennessee. He graduated from Vanderbilt University, where he earned an L.L.B. in 1910 and a BA in 1911. During World War I, he served as a Captain of Field Artillery in the United States Army.

== Career ==
Henry started his career as a journalist in Nashville from 1907 to 1913. He was a secretary to Tennessee Governor Ben W. Hooper from 1913 to 1915. He practised the law in Nashville from 1915 to 1921.

Henry was Director of Public Relations for the Nashville, Chattanooga and St. Louis Railway from 1921 to 1928; Assistant to the Vice President of the Nashville, Chattanooga and St. Louis Railrway from 1928 to 1934; and vice president of the Association of American Railroads from 1934 to 1958.

Henry was the author of several books about the American Civil War, the Mexican–American War and the railroad industry. He was the president of the Southern Historical Association in 1957.

Henry served on the board of trust of his alma mater, Vanderbilt University. He was also the president of the Vanderbilt Alumni Association.

Henry served in the United States Army Reserve until his retirement as Colonel in 1952.

== Personal life and death ==
With his wife Lura Temple, Henry had two daughters. He died on August 19, 1970, in Alexandria, Virginia, and he was buried in Nashville.

Henry's brother, Douglas "Duck" Henry, was a member of the Tennessee Senate.

== Works ==
- Henry, Robert Selph (1934). Trains. Indianapolis: Bobbs-Merrill. OCLC 24002261.
- Henry, Robert Selph (1937). The Story of the Confederacy. New York: Grosset & Dunlap. OCLC 560875954.
- Henry, Robert Selph (1938). The Story of Reconstruction. Indianapolis: Bobbs-Merrill. OCLC 2511368.
- Henry, Robert Selph (1944). First with the Most: Nathan Bedford Forrest. Indianapolis: Bobbs-Merrill.
- Henry, Robert Selph (1946). This Fascinating Railroad Business. Indianapolis: Bobbs-Merrill. OCLC 1616925.
- Henry, Robert Selph (1956). As They Saw Forrest: Some Recollections And Comments Of Contemporaries. Jackson, Tennessee: McCowat-Mercer Press.
- Henry, Robert Selph (1961). The Story of the Mexican war. New York: F. Ungar Publishing Co.
- Henry, Robert Selph (1964). The Armed Forces Institute of Pathology: Its First Century, 1862–1962. Washington, D.C.: Department of the Army. OCLC 753084717.
- Donovan, Frank P.; Henry, Robert Selph, eds. (1968). Headlights and Markers: An Anthology Of Railroad Stories. San Marino, California: Golden West Books.
- Henry, Robert Selph; Kuhler, Otto (1976). Portraits Of The Iron Horse: The American Locomotive In Pictures and Story. Santa Fe, New Mexico: Sunstone Press. OCLC 918475638.
