= 1916 Navy Midshipmen football team =

American college football season

1916 Navy Midshipmen football
- Conference: Independent
- Record: 6–3–1
- Head coach: Jonas Ingram (2nd season)
- Captain: Clarence Ward
- Home stadium: Worden Field

1916 Southern college football independents records
	Conf.			Overall
Team	W	L	T	W		L		T
Birmingham		–		7	–	1	–	0
Southwestern Louisiana Industrial		–		7	–	1	–	0
Maryland State		–		6	–	2	–	0
Marshall		–		7	–	2	–	1
Stetson		–		3	–	1	–	0
Middle Tennessee State Normal		–		5	–	2	–	0
Sam Houston Normal		–		5	–	2	–	0
Spring Hill		–		4	–	2	–	0
West Virginia		–		5	–	2	–	2
Navy		–		6	–	3	–	1
Southwest Texas State		–		3	–	1	–	3
Presbyterian		–		4	–	3	–	0
Delaware		–		4	–	3	–	1
North Texas State Normal		–		4	–	3	–	1
Western Kentucky State Normal		–		3	–	2	–	0
George Washington		–		3	–	3	–	1
Wake Forest		–		3	–	3	–	0
Louisville		–		2	–	3	–	1
West Tennessee State Normal		–		2	–	3	–	1
Texas Mines		–		2	–	3	–	0
Tusculum		–		2	–	3	–	0
Cumberland (TN)		–		0	–	2	–	0

The 1916 Navy Midshipmen football team represented the United States Naval Academy during the 1916 college football season. In their second season under head coach Jonas Ingram, the Midshipmen compiled a 6–3–1 record and outscored their opponents by a combined score of 199 to 76.

The annual Army–Navy Game was played on November 25 at the Polo Grounds in New York City; Army won 15–7.

== Schedule ==
Date	Time	Opponent	Site	Result	Attendance	Source
September 30		Dickinson	Worden Field; Annapolis, MD	T 0–0		
October 7		Georgetown	Worden Field; Annapolis, MD	W 13–7		
October 11		Maryland State	Worden Field; Annapolis, MD (rivalry)	W 14–7		
October 14		Pittsburgh	Worden Field; Annapolis, MD	L 19–20	4,000	
October 21		West Virginia	Worden Field; Annapolis, MD	W 12–7		
October 28		Georgia	Worden Field; Annapolis, MD	W 27–3		
November 4	2:30 p.m.	Washington and Lee	Worden Field; Annapolis, MD	L 0–10		
November 11		at North Carolina A&M	Worden Field; Annapolis, MD	W 50–0		
November 18		Villanova	Worden Field; Annapolis, MD	W 57–7		
November 25		vs. Army	Polo Grounds; New York, NY (Army–Navy Game)	L 7–15		
All times are in Eastern time
