= 1916 Marshall Thundering Herd football team =

American college football season

1916 Marshall Thundering Herd football
- Conference: Independent
- Record: 7–2–1
- Head coach: Boyd Chambers (8th season)
- Captain: Benny Shepherd
- Home stadium: Central Field

1916 Southern college football independents records
	Conf.			Overall
Team	W	L	T	W		L		T
Birmingham		–		7	–	1	–	0
Southwestern Louisiana Industrial		–		7	–	1	–	0
Maryland State		–		6	–	2	–	0
Marshall		–		7	–	2	–	1
Stetson		–		3	–	1	–	0
Middle Tennessee State Normal		–		5	–	2	–	0
Sam Houston Normal		–		5	–	2	–	0
Spring Hill		–		4	–	2	–	0
West Virginia		–		5	–	2	–	2
Navy		–		6	–	3	–	1
Southwest Texas State		–		3	–	1	–	3
Presbyterian		–		4	–	3	–	0
Delaware		–		4	–	3	–	1
North Texas State Normal		–		4	–	3	–	1
Western Kentucky State Normal		–		3	–	2	–	0
Wake Forest		–		3	–	3	–	0
Louisville		–		2	–	3	–	1
West Tennessee State Normal		–		2	–	3	–	1
Texas Mines		–		2	–	3	–	0
Tusculum		–		2	–	3	–	0
Cumberland (TN)		–		0	–	2	–	0

The 1916 Marshall Thundering Herd football team represented Marshall College (now Marshall University) as an independent during the 1916 college football season. Marshall posted a 7–2–1 record, outscoring its opposition 267–101. Home games were played on a campus field called "Central Field" which is presently Campus Commons.

== Schedule ==
Date	Opponent	Site	Result	Source
September 29	at Rio Grande	Rio Grande, OH	W 26–12	
October 7	Second Regiment	Central Field; Huntington, WV	W 15–0	
October 14	at Muskingum	New Concord, OH	W 19–0	
October 21	Kentucky Wesleyan	Central Field; Huntington, WV	W 101–0	
October 28	at Transylvania	Thomas Field; Lexington, KY	T 19–19	
November 4	Otterbein	Central Field; Huntington, WV	W 12–6	
November 11	vs. Marietta	Parkersburg, WV	L 13–40	
November 18	at Davis & Elkins	Elkins, WV	L 0–24	
November 24	Morris Harvey	Central Field; Huntington, WV	W 55–0	
November 30	Ohio Northern^{†}	Central Field; Huntington, WV	W 7–0	
^{†}Homecoming
