= 1916 Texas Mines Miners football team =

American college football season

1916 Texas Mines Miners football
- Conference: Independent
- Record: 2–3
- Head coach: Tommy Dwyer (3rd season)

1916 Southern college football independents records
| | Conf. | | | Overall |
| Team | W | L | T | W | | L | | T |
|---|---|---|---|---|---|---|---|---|
| Birmingham | | – | | 7 | – | 1 | – | 0 |
| Southwestern Louisiana Industrial | | – | | 7 | – | 1 | – | 0 |
| Maryland State | | – | | 6 | – | 2 | – | 0 |
| Marshall | | – | | 7 | – | 2 | – | 1 |
| Stetson | | – | | 3 | – | 1 | – | 0 |
| Middle Tennessee State Normal | | – | | 5 | – | 2 | – | 0 |
| Sam Houston Normal | | – | | 5 | – | 2 | – | 0 |
| Spring Hill | | – | | 4 | – | 2 | – | 0 |
| West Virginia | | – | | 5 | – | 2 | – | 2 |
| Navy | | – | | 6 | – | 3 | – | 1 |
| Southwest Texas State | | – | | 3 | – | 1 | – | 3 |
| Presbyterian | | – | | 4 | – | 3 | – | 0 |
| Delaware | | – | | 4 | – | 3 | – | 1 |
| North Texas State Normal | | – | | 4 | – | 3 | – | 1 |
| Western Kentucky State Normal | | – | | 3 | – | 2 | – | 0 |
| George Washington | | – | | 3 | – | 3 | – | 1 |
| Wake Forest | | – | | 3 | – | 3 | – | 0 |
| Louisville | | – | | 2 | – | 3 | – | 1 |
| West Tennessee State Normal | | – | | 2 | – | 3 | – | 1 |
| Texas Mines | | – | | 2 | – | 3 | – | 0 |
| Tusculum | | – | | 2 | – | 3 | – | 0 |
| Cumberland (TN) | | – | | 0 | – | 2 | – | 0 |

The 1916 Texas Mines Miners football team was an American football team that represented the Texas School of Mines (now known as the University of Texas at El Paso) as an independent during the 1916 college football season. In their third year under head coach Tommy Dwyer, the team compiled a 2–3 record.

== Schedule ==
| Date | Opponent | Site | Result | Source |
|---|---|---|---|---|
| October 21 | El Paso High School | El Paso, TX | L 3–14 | |
| November 4 | at Arizona | Tucson, AZ | L 0–41 | |
| November 20 | at El Paso High School | El Paso High School Stadium; El Paso, TX | W 19–0 | |
| November 25 | at New Mexico A&M | Las Cruces, NM (rivalry) | W 6–3 | |
| November 30 | New Mexico Military | El Paso, TX | L 0–79 | |
