= 1916 Delaware Fightin' Blue Hens football team =

American college football season

1916 Delaware Fightin' Blue Hens football
- Conference: Independent
- Record: 4–3–1
- Head coach: William McAvoy (9th season)
- Captain: Michael J. Fidance
- Home stadium: Frazer Field

1916 Southern college football independents records
	Conf.			Overall
Team	W	L	T	W		L		T
Birmingham		–		7	–	1	–	0
Southwestern Louisiana Industrial		–		7	–	1	–	0
Maryland State		–		6	–	2	–	0
Marshall		–		7	–	2	–	1
Stetson		–		3	–	1	–	0
Middle Tennessee State Normal		–		5	–	2	–	0
Sam Houston Normal		–		5	–	2	–	0
Spring Hill		–		4	–	2	–	0
West Virginia		–		5	–	2	–	2
Navy		–		6	–	3	–	1
Southwest Texas State		–		3	–	1	–	3
Presbyterian		–		4	–	3	–	0
Delaware		–		4	–	3	–	1
North Texas State Normal		–		4	–	3	–	1
Western Kentucky State Normal		–		3	–	2	–	0
George Washington		–		3	–	3	–	1
Wake Forest		–		3	–	3	–	0
Louisville		–		2	–	3	–	1
West Tennessee State Normal		–		2	–	3	–	1
Texas Mines		–		2	–	3	–	0
Tusculum		–		2	–	3	–	0
Cumberland (TN)		–		0	–	2	–	0

The 1916 Delaware Fightin' Blue Hens football team was an American football team that represented Delaware College (later renamed the University of Delaware) as an independent during the 1916 college football season. In their ninth season under head coach William McAvoy, the Blue Hens compiled a 4–3–1 record and were outscored by a total of 66 to 60. Michael J. Fidance was the team captain. The team played its home games at Frazer Field in Newark, Delaware.

== Schedule ==
Date	Opponent	Site	Result	Attendance	Source
October 7	at Pennsylvania Military	Chester, PA	W 21–0		
October 14	Western Maryland	Frazer Field; Newark, DE	L 0–16		
October 21	Haverford	Frazer Field; Newark, DE	T 0–0		
October 28	at Stevens	Hoboken, NJ	W 5–0		
November 4	at Dickinson	Biddle Field; Carlisle, PA	L 0–22		
November 11	St. John's (MD)	Frazer Field; Newark, DE	W 14–0		
November 18	Gallaudet	Frazer Field; Newark, DE	W 13–6		
November 30	Mount St. Mary's	Frazer Field; Newark, DE	L 7–22		
