= Douglas Henry =

American politician (1926–2017)

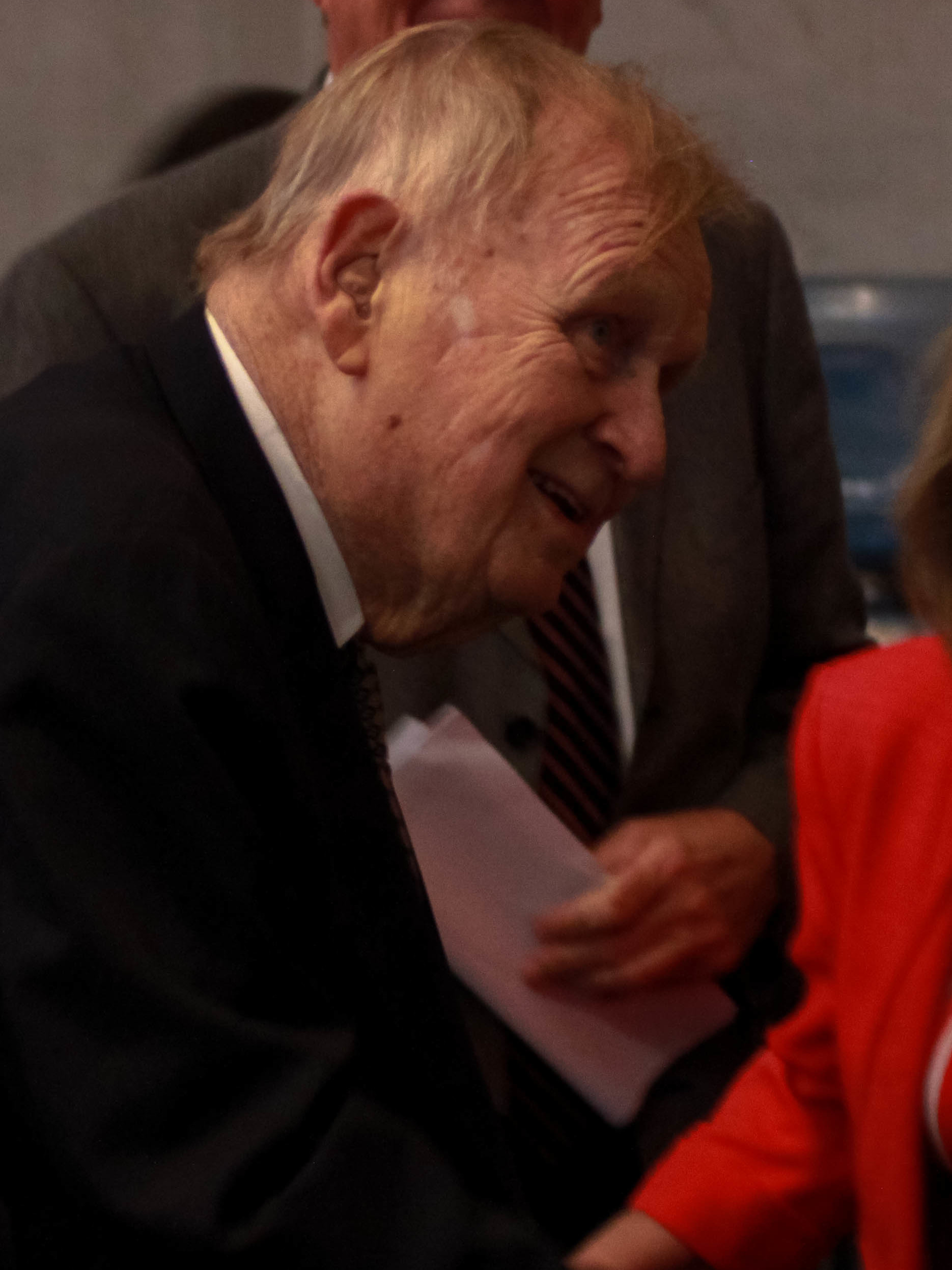
- Henry in 2014

Member of the Tennessee Senate from the 21st district
- In office 1971–2014
- Succeeded by: Jeff Yarbro

Personal details
- Born: May 18, 1926 Nashville, Tennessee, U.S.
- Died: March 5, 2017 (aged 90) Nashville, Tennessee, U.S.
- Party: Democratic
- Education: Vanderbilt University
- Profession: Attorney

Douglas Selph "Duck" Henry Jr. (May 18, 1926 – March 5, 2017) was an American attorney and Democratic politician. He was the longest-serving member of the Tennessee legislature. He was a member of the Tennessee Senate, representing the 21st district (part of Davidson County). He served as a state senator beginning with his election to the 87th General Assembly, prior to which he was a member of the Tennessee House of Representatives during the 79th General Assembly.

== Early life ==
Henry was born on May 14, 1926, in Nashville, Tennessee, to Kathryn Craig Henry and Douglas Selph Henry Sr. He grew up in Belle Meade, Tennessee, where he was raised as a Presbyterian. His grandfather, Cornelius Abernathy (C.A.) Craig. was the founder of the National Life and Accident Insurance Co., and his father, Douglas Selph Henry Sr., served in the Tennessee Senate. Robert Selph Henry, his uncle, was an attorney and a historian who authored history books, such as The Story of the Confederacy (1931) and The Story of Reconstruction (1938).

Henry was educated at The Parmer School, Wallace School, and The McCallie School in Chattanooga, Tennessee, and graduated from the Montgomery Bell Academy in 1941.

Henry served as a member of the United States Army in the Philippines for over two years during World War II. He received the Philippine Independence Medal.

Henry graduated with a BA in French, Greek, and Latin from College of Arts and Science at Vanderbilt University. He subsequently earned an LL.B from the Vanderbilt Law School.

== Career ==
Henry began his career a practising attorney and legal counsel to the family business, the National Life and Accident Insurance Co.

Henry made an initial and unsuccessful bid for election into the Tennessee House of Representatives during 1952. Henry was first elected into the Tennessee House of Representatives in 1954.

Henry was absent from politics during the 1960s, working as a corporate attorney for National Life Insurance Company.

Returning to the political arena in 1970, Henry was elected 11 consecutive times to the Tennessee State Senate, most recently narrowly defeating challenger Jeff Yarbro in the 2010 primary by just 17 votes.

In the 1970s, Henry smoked marijuana outside the state of Tennessee to experience it before he could vote on a decriminalization bill in the senate.

Henry stated that he legislatively supported "education, children's welfare, and voting rights". In 1978, Henry helped pass a law in Tennessee for the mandatory use of child seat belts.

== End of legislative service ==
When the Republicans became the majority in the state Senate in 2007, they called Henry the “chairman emeritus” of the body's Finance Committee out of respect. Despite being from the minority party, his views within the committee were given disproportionate weight.

After his district was drastically altered by the Republican Legislative majority, Henry announced he would not seek re-election in 2014, instead opting to retire. Yarbro, Henry's challenger in 2010, defeated current Tennessee Democratic Party Chair Mary Mancini in the 2014 primary and is the current Senator from the 21st District.

By the time he retired, he was the longest-serving member of the Tennessee legislature, with a 23-year record. On his retirement, the State Comptroller of the Treasury, Justin P. Wilson, called him "a true gentleman."

== Personal life ==
With his wife, Loiette Hume "Lolly" Henry, Henry had two sons named Robert Selph Henry and Douglas Cornelius Hume Henry, and four daughters named Loiette Henry Thompson, Kathryn Henry-Choisser, Mary Leland Henry Wehner, and the late Emily McMahon. Lolly died in December 2016.

== Death ==
Henry died on March 5, 2017, at his home in Nashville, Tennessee. Shortly after his death, former Vice President Al Gore called him "a dear friend". Tennessee Governor Bill Haslam called him "a powerhouse intellect, courteous, kind, genuine and a statesman" and added "I will miss knowing that his wisdom and perspective are only a phone call away". The mayor of Nashville, Megan Barry, praised his "high standard for decorum and decency in public life" while Vanderbilt University's chancellor Nicholas Zeppos called him "a distinguished public servant, esteemed Vanderbilt alumnus, generous benefactor and dear friend."

Henry's body was to lie in state in the Tennessee State Capitol on March 9, 2017, which has not happened since Governor Austin Peay in 1927. His funeral was planned to be held at the Downtown Presbyterian Church on March 10, 2017.
