= 1916 West Virginia Mountaineers football team =

American college football season

1916 West Virginia Mountaineers football
- Conference: Independent
- Record: 5–2–2
- Head coach: Mont McIntire (1st season)
- Captain: Harry Curry

1916 Southern college football independents records
	Conf.			Overall
Team	W	L	T	W		L		T
Birmingham		–		7	–	1	–	0
Southwestern Louisiana Industrial		–		7	–	1	–	0
Maryland State		–		6	–	2	–	0
Marshall		–		7	–	2	–	1
Stetson		–		3	–	1	–	0
Middle Tennessee State Normal		–		5	–	2	–	0
Sam Houston Normal		–		5	–	2	–	0
Spring Hill		–		4	–	2	–	0
West Virginia		–		5	–	2	–	2
Navy		–		6	–	3	–	1
Southwest Texas State		–		3	–	1	–	3
Presbyterian		–		4	–	3	–	0
Delaware		–		4	–	3	–	1
North Texas State Normal		–		4	–	3	–	1
Western Kentucky State Normal		–		3	–	2	–	0
Wake Forest		–		3	–	3	–	0
Louisville		–		2	–	3	–	1
West Tennessee State Normal		–		2	–	3	–	1
Texas Mines		–		2	–	3	–	0
Tusculum		–		2	–	3	–	0
Cumberland (TN)		–		0	–	2	–	0

The 1916 West Virginia Mountaineers football team was an American football team that represented West Virginia University as an independent during the 1916 college football season. In its first season under head coach Mont McIntire, the team compiled a 5–2–2 record and outscored opponents by a total of 198 to 38.

== Schedule ==
Date	Opponent	Site	Result	Source
September 30	at Penn	Franklin Field; Philadelphia, PA	L 0–3	
October 14	vs. VPI	Charleston, WV (rivalry)	W 20–0	
October 21	at Navy	Worden Field; Annapolis, MD	L 7–12	
October 28	Davis & Elkins	Athletic Field; Morgantown, WV	W 58–0	
November 4	Gettysburg	Athletic Field; Morgantown, WV	W 12–6	
November 11	at Rutgers	Neilson Field; New Brunswick, NJ	T 0–0	
November 18	at Dartmouth	Alumni Oval; Hanover, NH	T 7–7	
November 25	Catholic University	Athletic Field; Morgantown, WV	W 40–3	
November 30	vs. West Virginia Wesleyan	South Side Park; Fairmont, WV	W 54–7	
