= 1916 Western Kentucky State Normal football team =

American college football season

1916 Western Kentucky State Normal football
- Conference: Independent
- Record: 3–2
- Head coach: J. L. Arthur (3rd season)

1916 Southern college football independents records
	Conf.			Overall
Team	W	L	T	W		L		T
Birmingham		–		7	–	1	–	0
Southwestern Louisiana Industrial		–		7	–	1	–	0
Maryland State		–		6	–	2	–	0
Marshall		–		7	–	2	–	1
Stetson		–		3	–	1	–	0
Middle Tennessee State Normal		–		5	–	2	–	0
Sam Houston Normal		–		5	–	2	–	0
Spring Hill		–		4	–	2	–	0
West Virginia		–		5	–	2	–	2
Navy		–		6	–	3	–	1
Southwest Texas State		–		3	–	1	–	3
Presbyterian		–		4	–	3	–	0
Delaware		–		4	–	3	–	1
North Texas State Normal		–		4	–	3	–	1
Western Kentucky State Normal		–		3	–	2	–	0
Wake Forest		–		3	–	3	–	0
Louisville		–		2	–	3	–	1
West Tennessee State Normal		–		2	–	3	–	1
Texas Mines		–		2	–	3	–	0
Tusculum		–		2	–	3	–	0
Cumberland (TN)		–		0	–	2	–	0

The 1916 Western Kentucky State Normal football team represented Western Kentucky State Normal School (now known as Western Kentucky University) as an independent during the 1916 college football season. They were led by head coach J. L. Arthur.

== Schedule ==
Date	Opponent	Site	Result
	Portland High School	Bowling Green, KY	W 1–0
October 7	Clarksville High School	Bowling Green, KY	W 14–0
October 14	Owensboro High School	Bowling Green, KY	W 2–0
November 4	Eastern Kentucky State Normal	Bowling Green, KY (rivalry)	L 12–13
November 30	Eastern Kentucky State Normal	Bowling Green, KY	L 0–16
