= 1916 Wake Forest Baptists football team =

American college football season

1916 Wake Forest Baptists football
- Conference: Independent
- Record: 3–3
- Head coach: G. M. Billings (1st season)
- Captain: Charles Parker

1916 Southern college football independents records
| | Conf. | | | Overall |
| Team | W | L | T | W | | L | | T |
|---|---|---|---|---|---|---|---|---|
| Birmingham | | – | | 7 | – | 1 | – | 0 |
| Southwestern Louisiana Industrial | | – | | 7 | – | 1 | – | 0 |
| Maryland State | | – | | 6 | – | 2 | – | 0 |
| Marshall | | – | | 7 | – | 2 | – | 1 |
| Stetson | | – | | 3 | – | 1 | – | 0 |
| Middle Tennessee State Normal | | – | | 5 | – | 2 | – | 0 |
| Sam Houston Normal | | – | | 5 | – | 2 | – | 0 |
| Spring Hill | | – | | 4 | – | 2 | – | 0 |
| West Virginia | | – | | 5 | – | 2 | – | 2 |
| Navy | | – | | 6 | – | 3 | – | 1 |
| Southwest Texas State | | – | | 3 | – | 1 | – | 3 |
| Presbyterian | | – | | 4 | – | 3 | – | 0 |
| Delaware | | – | | 4 | – | 3 | – | 1 |
| North Texas State Normal | | – | | 4 | – | 3 | – | 1 |
| Western Kentucky State Normal | | – | | 3 | – | 2 | – | 0 |
| Wake Forest | | – | | 3 | – | 3 | – | 0 |
| Louisville | | – | | 2 | – | 3 | – | 1 |
| West Tennessee State Normal | | – | | 2 | – | 3 | – | 1 |
| Texas Mines | | – | | 2 | – | 3 | – | 0 |
| Tusculum | | – | | 2 | – | 3 | – | 0 |
| Cumberland (TN) | | – | | 0 | – | 2 | – | 0 |

The 1916 Wake Forest Baptists football team was an American football team that represented Wake Forest College (now known as Wake Forest University) as an independent during the 1916 college football season. In their first year under head coach G. M. Billings, the team compiled a 3–3 record.

== Schedule ==
| Date | Opponent | Site | Result | Attendance | Source |
|---|---|---|---|---|---|
| September 30 | at North Carolina | Emerson Field; Chapel Hill, NC (rivalry) | L 0–20 | 2,500 | |
| October 7 | Guilford | Wake Forest, NC | W 33–0 | | |
| October 19 | at North Carolina A&M | Riddick Stadium; Raleigh, NC (rivalry) | L 0–6 | | |
| November 4 | at South Carolina | Davis Field; Columbia, SC | W 33–7 | | |
| November 11 | at VPI | Miles Field; Blacksburg, VA | L 0–52 | | |
| November 18 | Wofford | Wake Forest, NC | W 41–0 | | |
