= Douglas "Duck" Henry =

American football player, coach, and politician (1890–1971)

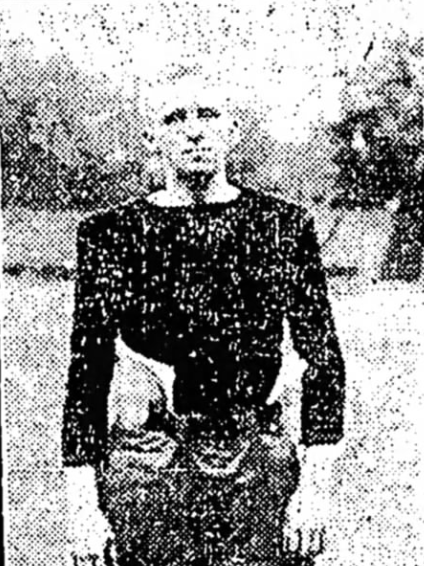
- Henry in c. 1913

Mayor of Belle Meade, Tennessee
- In office 1938–1940

Member of the Tennessee Senate
- In office 1927–1928

Personal details
- Born: Douglas Selph Henry; December 30, 1890 Clifton, Tennessee, U.S.
- Died: September 3, 1971 (aged 80) Nashville, Tennessee, U.S.
- Resting place: Mount Olivet Cemetery
- Party: Democratic
- Spouse: Kathryn Craig (m. 1924)
- Children: 2, including Douglas Jr.
- Relatives: Robert Selph Henry (brother)
- Education: Vanderbilt University (BS, LL.B)

Military service
- Allegiance: United States
- Branch/service: United States Army
- Years of service: 1917–1918
- Rank: Captain
- Unit: 3rd Infantry Division; 18th Field Artillery
- Battles/wars: World War I
- Awards: World War I Victory Medal; Coaching career

Playing career

Football
- 1909–1910: Vanderbilt
- 1913–1914: Vanderbilt

Basketball
- 1909–1911: Vanderbilt
- 1914–1915: Vanderbilt
- Positions: Fullback (football); Guard (basketball)

Coaching career (HC unless noted)

Football
- 1911–1912: Birmingham

Basketball
- 1911–1913: Birmingham

Track and field
- 1912–1913: Birmingham

Administrative career (AD unless noted)
- 1911–1913: Birmingham

Head coaching record
- Overall: 1–12–1 (football)

Douglas Selph "Duck" Henry Sr. (December 30, 1890 – September 3, 1971) was an American college football player, coach, and politician who served as the first mayor of Belle Meade, Tennessee from 1938 to 1940.

== Biography ==
Henry was born on December 30, 1890, in Clifton, Tennessee, to Robert Henry and Emily Selph.

Henry played college football for Vanderbilt under head coach Dan McGugin's from 1909 to 1910 as a reserve fullback. He also played basketball. After the 1910–11 school year, he dropped out and began coaching at Birmingham College. Alongside serving as the athletic director, he was the head football, basketball, and track and field coach from 1911 to 1913. In 1913, Henry returned to Vanderbilt as a halfback for the football team. He returned to playing basketball the next year after having to miss the previous season due to illness.

After graduating, Henry regularly participated in Vanderbilt alumni basketball games.

Blake left Vanderbilt in 1915 to practice law before entering the United States Army. He was deployed as a lieutenant during World War I on the French front with the 18th field artillery. He finished his deployment at the rank of captain. After returning from the war, he returned to practicing law until 1926 when he joined the National Life and Accident Insurance Company as assistant counsel. In 1930 he was voted onto the company's board of directors alongside being promoted to associate general counsel in 1936 and then to general counsel in 1947. In 1950, he became the vice president. He semi-retired in 1960 but remained on the counsel until 1970.

During his years on the National Life and Accident Insurance Company counsel he served as the state senator from Davidson County from 1927 to 1928. He was also the first mayor of Belle Meade, Tennessee, from 1938 to 1940.

Henry's brother, Robert Selph Henry, was also a lawyer. Henry married Kathryn Craig. Together they had a son, Douglas Henry, who served as a member of the Tennessee Senate from the 21st district from 1971 to 2014 and a daughter.

Henry died on September 3, 1971, in Nashville, Tennessee, following a short illness.

== Head coaching record ==
=== Football ===
Year	Team	Overall	Conference	Standing	Bowl/playoffs
Birmingham (Independent) (1911–1912)
1911	Birmingham	0–6–1			
1912	Birmingham	1–6			
Birmingham:		1–12–1			
Total:		1–12–1			
