= Ray Stanley =

American basketball coach (1914 or 1915–1990)

Biographical details
- Born: October 22, 1914 or 1915; Wallasey, U.K.
- Died: February 18, 1990 (aged 73 or 74)

Playing career
- 1935–1938: Penn

Coaching career (HC unless noted)
- 1939–1942: Penn (JV)
- 1946–1949: Lafayette (assistant)
- 1949–1951: Lafayette
- 1954–1956: Penn

Administrative career (AD unless noted)
- 1946–1951: Lafayette (asst. AD)

Head coaching record
- Overall: 60–30 (.667)

Accomplishments and honors

Championships
- As player 1x Eastern Intercollegiate Basketball League champion (1937); As coach 1x Middle Three Conference champion (1950); 1x Ivy League champion (1955)

Raymond Arthur Stanley (October 22, 1914 or 1915^{1} – February 18, 1990) was an American basketball player and coach who was the men's basketball coach at Lafayette College from 1949 to 1951 and the University of Pennsylvania from 1954 to 1956.

== Playing ==
Stanley was born on October 22, 1914 or 1915^{1} in Wallasey, England. He grew up in Narberth, Pennsylvania and attended Lower Merion High School. He was captain of LMHS' 1934 Pennsylvania Interscholastic Athletic Association championship basketball team. He was a member of the Penn Quakers men's basketball team that won the 1937 Eastern Intercollegiate Basketball League title. He graduated from the University of Pennsylvania in 1938.

== Coaching ==
In 1940, Stanley returned to Penn as junior varsity basketball coach. In 1941, he coached Penn's JV football team to a 5–5 record. He resigned in 1942 due to increased business pressures caused by World War II. As a member of the United States Naval Reserve, he coached teams at USNTS Sampson and Camp MacDonough. After the war, he returned to Narberth and worked in the freight traffic department of the Pennsylvania Railroad.

In 1946, Stanley became the assistant athletic director and assistant basketball coach under his former high school coach, William H. Anderson, at Lafayette College. He became the head coach in 1949 when Anderson stepped aside to focus on his administrative duties. He led the Leopards to a 18–6 record and a Middle Three Conference title in his first season as head coach. They started his second second with an 11–5 record. On February 10, 1951, Stanley resigned to take a position with a Philadelphia manufacturing company. He was succeeded on an interim basis by Anderson.

In 1954, Stanley became Penn's head basketball coach after Howie Dallmar resigned to coach at Stanford. He took the job on a part-time basis, which allowed him to continue working as a purchasing agent for General Refractories Co. In 1954–55, the Quakers went 19–6, were co-champions of the Ivy League, and were ranked as high as #16 in the AP poll. They were not as successful the following season, going 12–13. Stanley resigned in May 1956 and was succeeded by his assistant, Jack McCloskey.

== Notes ==
1. The United States Department of Veterans Affairs Beneficiary Identification Records Locator Subsystem gives Stanley's date of birth as October 22, 1915. Stanley gave his date of birth as October 22, 1914 on a document he submitted to Narberth's American Legion post.
