= 1916 Sam Houston Normal football team =

American college football season

1916 Sam Houston Normal football
- Conference: Independent
- Record: 5–2
- Head coach: Gene Berry (3rd season)

1916 Southern college football independents records
	Conf.			Overall
Team	W	L	T	W		L		T
Birmingham		–		7	–	1	–	0
Southwestern Louisiana Industrial		–		7	–	1	–	0
Maryland State		–		6	–	2	–	0
Marshall		–		7	–	2	–	1
Stetson		–		3	–	1	–	0
Middle Tennessee State Normal		–		5	–	2	–	0
Sam Houston Normal		–		5	–	2	–	0
Spring Hill		–		4	–	2	–	0
West Virginia		–		5	–	2	–	2
Navy		–		6	–	3	–	1
Southwest Texas State		–		3	–	1	–	3
Presbyterian		–		4	–	3	–	0
Delaware		–		4	–	3	–	1
North Texas State Normal		–		4	–	3	–	1
Western Kentucky State Normal		–		3	–	2	–	0
Wake Forest		–		3	–	3	–	0
Louisville		–		2	–	3	–	1
West Tennessee State Normal		–		2	–	3	–	1
Texas Mines		–		2	–	3	–	0
Tusculum		–		2	–	3	–	0
Cumberland (TN)		–		0	–	2	–	0

The 1916 Sam Houston Normal football team represented Sam Houston Normal Institute—now known as Sam Houston State University—as an independent during the 1916 college football season. Led by third-year head coach Gene Berry, Sam Houston Normal compiled a record of 5–2.

== Schedule ==
Date	Time	Opponent	Site	Result	Source
October 7		Blinn	Huntsville, TX	W 78–0	
October 16		Alexander Institute	Huntsville, TX	W 40–0	
October 21		Texas A&M freshmen	Huntsville, TX	W 10–7	
October 23		Rusk Academy	Huntsville, TX	W 38–6	
November 13		Rice second team	Huntsville, TX	L 0–6	
November 20		Southwest Texas State	Huntsville, TX (rivalry)	W 61–0	
November 25	3:00 p.m.	at Texas freshmen	Clark Field; Austin, TX	L 0–35	
