= 1916 West Tennessee State Normal football team =

American college football season

1916 West Tennessee State Normal football
- Conference: Independent
- Record: 2–3–1
- Head coach: Tom Shea (1st season)
- Captain: Hugh Washburn
- Home stadium: Normal Field

1916 Southern college football independents records
	Conf.			Overall
Team	W	L	T	W		L		T
Birmingham		–		7	–	1	–	0
Southwestern Louisiana Industrial		–		7	–	1	–	0
Maryland State		–		6	–	2	–	0
Marshall		–		7	–	2	–	1
Stetson		–		3	–	1	–	0
Middle Tennessee State Normal		–		5	–	2	–	0
Sam Houston Normal		–		5	–	2	–	0
Spring Hill		–		4	–	2	–	0
West Virginia		–		5	–	2	–	2
Navy		–		6	–	3	–	1
Southwest Texas State		–		3	–	1	–	3
Presbyterian		–		4	–	3	–	0
Delaware		–		4	–	3	–	1
North Texas State Normal		–		4	–	3	–	1
Western Kentucky State Normal		–		3	–	2	–	0
Wake Forest		–		3	–	3	–	0
Louisville		–		2	–	3	–	1
West Tennessee State Normal		–		2	–	3	–	1
Texas Mines		–		2	–	3	–	0
Tusculum		–		2	–	3	–	0
Cumberland (TN)		–		0	–	2	–	0

The 1916 West Tennessee State Normal football team was an American football team that represented West Tennessee State Normal School (now known as the University of Memphis) as an independent during the 1916 college football season. In their first season under head coach Tom Shea, West Tennessee State Normal compiled a 2–3–1 record.

== Schedule ==
Date	Opponent	Site	Result	Source
October 14	Somerville High School	Memphis, TN	W 115–0	
October 21	Jackson High School	Normal Field; Memphis, TN	W 24–0	
October 27	at Haywood High School	Brownsville, TN	T 7–7	
November 11	at Union (TN)	Jackson, TN	L 6–7	
November 19	Central High School	Memphis, TN	L 0–49	
November 30	at Jonesboro Aggies	Jonesboro, AR (rivalry)	L 0–27	
