= Birmingham–Southern Panthers football =

- First season: 1918
- Last season: 2023
- Athletic director: Kyndall Waters
- Head coach: Anthony Colucci
- Stadium: General Krulak Stadium (capacity: 1,600)
- Location: Birmingham, Alabama
- Conference: Southern Athletic Association
- All-time record: 169–163–16 (.509)

Conference championships
- 1
- Colors: Black and gold
- Mascot: Panthers
- Website: bscsports.net

The Birmingham–Southern Panthers football team represented Birmingham–Southern College (BSC) in the NCAA Division III and competed as part of the Southern Athletic Association. BSC played its home games at the 1,600 seat Panther Stadium, which is located on-campus in Birmingham, Alabama and opened in November 2008. Although only fielding a team since the 2007 season, Birmingham–Southern previously fielded a team from the 1918 season that was later disbanded following the 1939 season.

== History ==
Prior to the consolidation of Southern University and Birmingham College, each fielded football squads. Between 1904 and 1917, Birmingham College compiled a 19–32–4 record, and between 1909 and 1916 Southern University compiled a 3–16–11 record. Following the consolidation of the schools as Birmingham–Southern, the program compiled an overall record of 87–80–16 between 1918 and 1939, winning Dixie Conference championships in 1932, 1934, and 1937.

During this period, the Panthers played their home games at the Munger Bowl, which was located on-campus and subsequently demolished in the 1960s to make way for campus expansion. Additionally, Howard College, now Samford University, was BSC's biggest rival with the annual contest being called the Magic City Classic and played in Rickwood Field before serving as the opening contest at Legion Field in 1929. Following the 1939 season, football was disbanded with the school citing its overall costs and influence on the school.

On May 26, 2006, the board of trustees announced that Birmingham–Southern would field a Division III football team to begin competition for the 2007 season. By the following June, Joey Jones was announced as the program's head coach, and on September 6, 2007, BSC played their first football game after a 68-year hiatus, as the Panthers defeated the Mississippi College junior varsity 41–13 at Legion Field. After a 3–7 first season, Jones would leave BSC to become the first head coach at South Alabama, and in February 2008 Eddie Garfinkle was announced as the Panthers' head coach. On October 24, 2016, it was announced that Garfinkle would not return after the 2016 season.

== Playoffs ==
=== NCAA Division III ===
The Panthers made one appearance in the NCAA Division III playoffs, with a combined record of 1–1.

Year	Round	Opponent	Result
2021	First Round; Second Round	Huntingdon; Mary Hardin–Baylor	W, 24–14; L, 7–42

== Seasons ==
Year	Coach	Overall	Conference	Standing	Bowl/playoffs
Birmingham–Southern Panthers (Independent) (1918–1920)
1918	Baby Haynes	1–1	Independent		
1919	Charles H. Brown	4–3	Independent		
1920	Charles H. Brown	6–2	Independent		
Independent:		11–6			
Birmingham–Southern Panthers (Southern Intercollegiate Athletic Association) (1921–1931)
1921	Charles H. Brown	4–4–1	SIAA		
1922	Charles H. Brown	1–6–1	SIAA		
1923	Charles H. Brown	1–5–2	SIAA		
1924	Harold Drew	4–4–1	SIAA		
1925	Harold Drew	7–3–1	SIAA		
1926	Harold Drew	5–3–2	SIAA		
1927	Harold Drew	3–6	SIAA		
1928	Jenks Gillem	3–2–4	SIAA		
1929	Jenks Gillem	4–4	SIAA		
1930	Jenks Gillem	5–4	SIAA		
1931	Jenks Gillem	3–4	SIAA		
SIAA:		40–45–12			
Birmingham–Southern Panthers (Dixie Conference) (1932–1939)
1932	Jenks Gillem	5–3	Dixie		
1933	Jenks Gillem	3–3–3	Dixie		
1934	Jenks Gillem	9–0	Dixie		
1935	Jenks Gillem	2–6	Dixie		
1936	Jenks Gillem	4–5	Dixie		
1937	Jenks Gillem	6–2	Dixie		
1938	Jenks Gillem	4–5	Dixie		
1939	Jenks Gillem	3–5–1	Dixie		
Dixie Conference:		36–29–4			
Birmingham–Southern Panthers (Did not field a team) (1940–2006)
Birmingham–Southern Panthers (Southern Collegiate Athletic Conference) (2007–2011)
2007	Joey Jones	3–7	SCAC		
2008	Eddie Garfinkle	3–7	SCAC		
2009	Eddie Garfinkle	4–6	SCAC		
2010	Eddie Garfinkle	6–4	SCAC		
2011	Eddie Garfinkle	7–2	SCAC		
SCAC:		23–26			
Birmingham–Southern Panthers (Southern Athletic Association) (2012–2023)
2012	Eddie Garfinkle	7–3	SAA		
2013	Eddie Garfinkle	5–4	SAA		
2014	Eddie Garfinkle	3–7	SAA		
2015	Eddie Garfinkle	5–5	SAA		
2016	Eddie Garfinkle	1–9	SAA		
2017	Tony Joe White	3–7	SAA		
2018	Tony Joe White	6–4	SAA		
2019	Tony Joe White	7–3	SAA		
2020	Tony Joe White	2–2	SAA		
2021	Tony Joe White	10–2	SAA		
2022	Tony Joe White	7–3	SAA		
2023	Anthony Colucci	3–7	SAA		
SAA:		59–56			
Total:		169–163–16			
National championship Conference title Conference division title or championship game berth
^{†}Indicates Bowl Coalition, Bowl Alliance, BCS, or CFP / New Years' Six bowl.; ^{#}Rankings from final Coaches Poll.

== Head coaches ==
Tenure	Coach	Years	Record	Pct.
1918	Baby Haynes	1	1–1–0	.500
1919–1923	Charles H. Brown	5	16–20–4	.450
1924–1927	Harold Drew	4	19–16–4	.538
1928–1939	Jenks Gillem	12	51–43–8	.539
2007	Joey Jones	1	3–7	.300
2008–2016	Eddie Garfinkle	9	41–46	.471
2017–2022	Tony Joe White	6	35–21	.625
2023	Anthony Colucci	1	3–7	.300
Totals	7 coaches	30	169–163–16	.509
