= 1917 college football rankings =

- Season: 1917
- Bowl season: 1917–18 bowl games
- End of season champions: Georgia Tech

The 1917 college football season rankings included a ranking by the International News Service news agency.

== International News Service ==
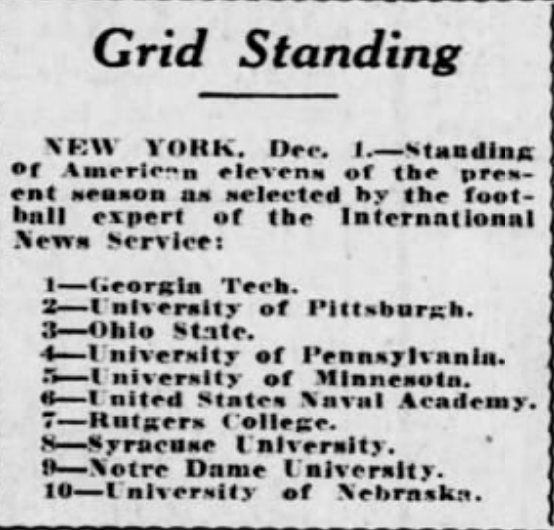
International News Service football rankings for 1917.

International News Service (INS) released a top ten ranking to their newswire on December 1.

INS is designated by the National Collegiate Athletic Association (NCAA) as a "major selector" of national championships, and their contemporary rankings for 1952–1957 are included in the NCAA college football records book.

Rank	Team	Record
1	Georgia Tech	9–0–0
2	Pittsburgh	10–0–0
3	Ohio State	8–0–1
4	Penn	9–2–0
5	Minnesota	4–1–0
6	Navy	7–1–0
7	Rutgers	7–1–1
8	Syracuse	8–1–1
9	Notre Dame	6–1–1
10	Nebraska	5–2–0

== See also ==
- 1917 College Football All-America Team
