= 1917 Carlisle Indians football team =

American college football season

1917 Carlisle Indians football
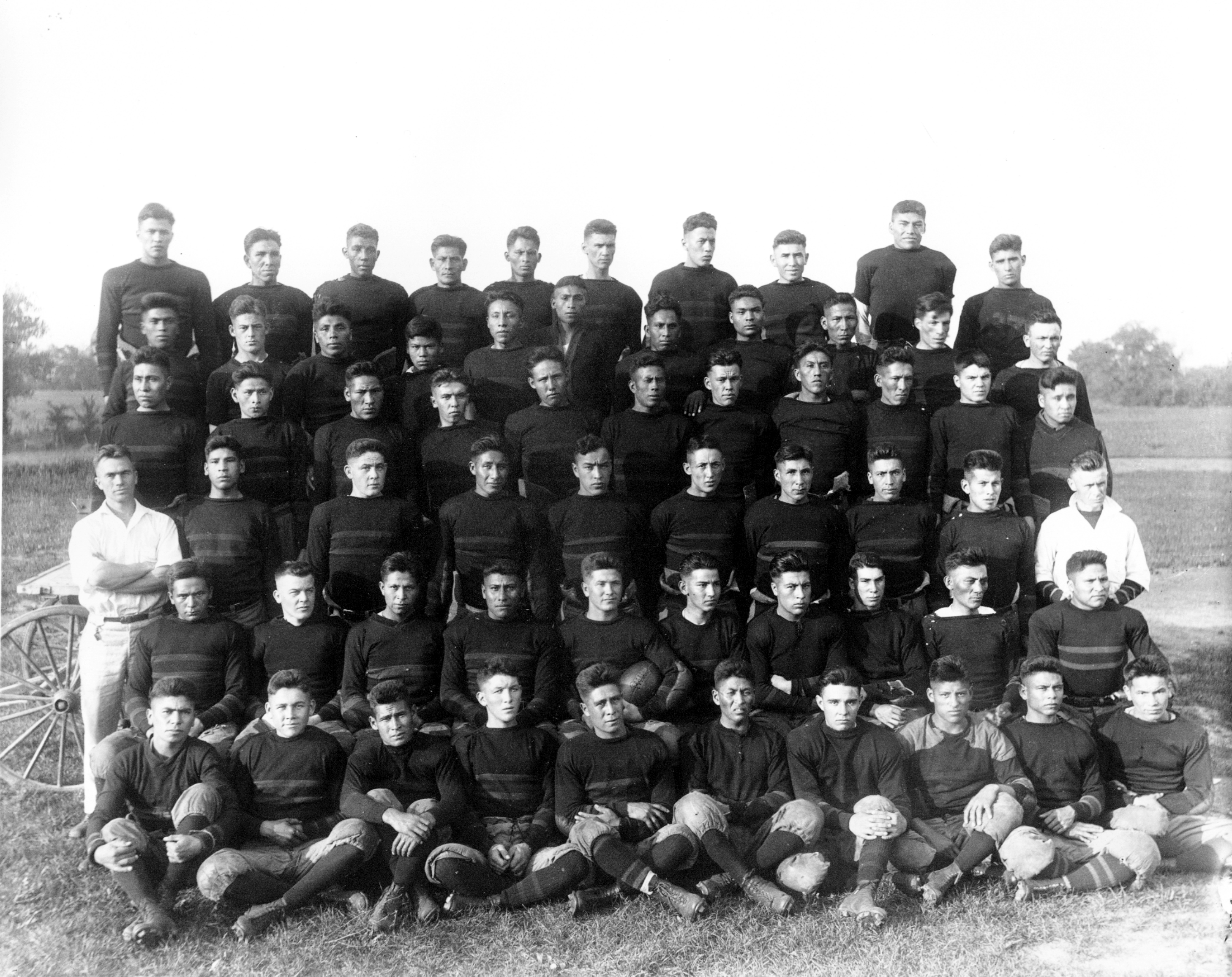
- Conference: Independent
- Record: 3–6
- Head coach: Deed Harris (1st season)

1917 Eastern college football independents records
	Conf.			Overall
Team	W	L	T	W		L		T
Pittsburgh		–		10	–	0	–	0
Williams		–		7	–	0	–	1
Yale		–		3	–	0	–	0
Princeton		–		2	–	0	–	0
Syracuse		–		8	–	1	–	1
Army		–		7	–	1	–	0
Rutgers		–		7	–	1	–	1
Penn		–		9	–	2	–	0
Brown		–		8	–	2	–	0
Fordham		–		7	–	2	–	0
Lehigh		–		7	–	2	–	0
Boston College		–		6	–	2	–	0
Swarthmore		–		6	–	2	–	0
Washington & Jefferson		–		7	–	3	–	0
Colgate		–		4	–	2	–	0
Harvard		–		3	–	1	–	3
New Hampshire		–		3	–	2	–	2
Dartmouth		–		5	–	3	–	0
Geneva		–		5	–	3	–	1
Penn State		–		5	–	4	–	0
Buffalo		–		4	–	4	–	0
NYU		–		2	–	2	–	3
Tufts		–		3	–	3	–	0
Carnegie Tech		–		2	–	3	–	1
Bucknell		–		3	–	5	–	1
Lafayette		–		3	–	5	–	0
Holy Cross		–		3	–	4	–	0
Rhode Island State		–		2	–	4	–	2
Carlisle		–		3	–	6	–	0
Columbia		–		2	–	4	–	0
Delaware		–		2	–	5	–	0
Cornell		–		3	–	6	–	0
Franklin & Marshall		–		2	–	6	–	0
Villanova		–		0	–	3	–	2
Temple		–		0	–	6	–	1

The 1917 Carlisle Indians football team represented the Carlisle Indian Industrial School as an independent during the 1917 college football season. Led by Deed Harris in his first and only season as head coach, the Indians compiled a record of 3–6.

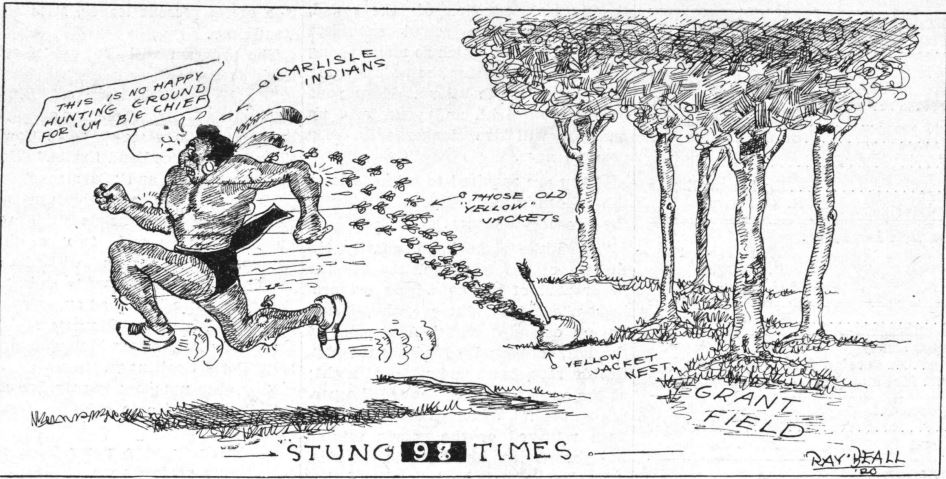
Cartoon published in the Technique following Carlisle's loss to Georgia Tech

== Schedule ==
Date	Opponent	Site	Result	Source
September 29	Albright	Carlisle, PA	W 60–0	
October 6	Franklin & Marshall	Carlisle, PA	W 63–0	
October 13	at West Virginia	Morgantown, WV	L 0–21	
October 20	at Navy	Worden Field; Annapolis, MD	L 0–61	
October 27	Johns Hopkins	Carlisle, PA	W 15–7	
November 3	at Bucknell	Lewisburg, PA	L 0–10	
November 10	at Army	The Plain; West Point, NY	L 0–28	
November 17	at Georgia Tech	Grant Field; Atlanta, GA	L 0–98	
November 24	at Penn	Franklin Field; Philadelphia, PA	L 0–26	
