= 1917 Cornell Big Red football team =

American college football season

1917 Cornell Big Red football
- Conference: Independent
- Record: 3–6
- Head coach: Albert Sharpe (6th season)
- Captain: Arthur Hoffman
- Home stadium: Schoellkopf Field

1917 Eastern college football independents records
	Conf.			Overall
Team	W	L	T	W		L		T
Pittsburgh		–		10	–	0	–	0
Williams		–		7	–	0	–	1
Yale		–		3	–	0	–	0
Princeton		–		2	–	0	–	0
Syracuse		–		8	–	1	–	1
Army		–		7	–	1	–	0
Rutgers		–		7	–	1	–	1
Penn		–		9	–	2	–	0
Brown		–		8	–	2	–	0
Fordham		–		7	–	2	–	0
Lehigh		–		7	–	2	–	0
Boston College		–		6	–	2	–	0
Swarthmore		–		6	–	2	–	0
Washington & Jefferson		–		7	–	3	–	0
Colgate		–		4	–	2	–	0
Harvard		–		3	–	1	–	3
New Hampshire		–		3	–	2	–	2
Dartmouth		–		5	–	3	–	0
Geneva		–		5	–	3	–	1
Penn State		–		5	–	4	–	0
Buffalo		–		4	–	4	–	0
NYU		–		2	–	2	–	3
Tufts		–		3	–	3	–	0
Carnegie Tech		–		2	–	3	–	1
Bucknell		–		3	–	5	–	1
Lafayette		–		3	–	5	–	0
Holy Cross		–		3	–	4	–	0
Rhode Island State		–		2	–	4	–	2
Carlisle		–		3	–	6	–	0
Columbia		–		2	–	4	–	0
Delaware		–		2	–	5	–	0
Cornell		–		3	–	6	–	0
Franklin & Marshall		–		2	–	6	–	0
Villanova		–		0	–	3	–	2
Temple		–		0	–	6	–	1

The 1917 Cornell Big Red football team was an American football team that represented Cornell University as an independent during the 1917 college football season. In their sixth season under head coach Albert Sharpe, the Big Red compiled a 3–6 record and were outscored by their opponents by a combined total of 146 to 78.

== Schedule ==
Date	Opponent	Site	Result	Attendance	Source
October 6	Oberlin	Schoellkopf Field; Ithaca, NY	W 22–0		
October 13	Williams	Schoellkopf Field; Ithaca, NY	L 10–14		
October 16	47th Infantry	Schoellkopf Field; Ithaca, NY	L 0–6		
October 20	Colgate	Schoellkopf Field; Ithaca, NY (rivalry)	L 0–20		
October 27	Bucknell	Schoellkopf Field; Ithaca, NY	W 20–0		
November 3	Carnegie Tech	Schoellkopf Field; Ithaca, NY	W 20–0		
November 10	at Michigan	Ferry Field; Ann Arbor, MI	L 0–42	16,733	
November 17	Fordham	Schoellkopf Field; Ithaca, NY	L 6–27		
November 29	at Penn	Franklin Field; Philadelphia, PA (rivalry)	L 0–37		
