= 1917 Williams Ephs football team =

American college football season

1917 Williams Ephs football
- Conference: Independent
- Record: 7–0–1
- Head coach: Mysterious Walker (1st season)
- Captain: Henry M. Halsted Jr.
- Home stadium: Weston Field

1917 Eastern college football independents records
	Conf.			Overall
Team	W	L	T	W		L		T
Pittsburgh		–		10	–	0	–	0
Williams		–		7	–	0	–	1
Yale		–		3	–	0	–	0
Princeton		–		2	–	0	–	0
Syracuse		–		8	–	1	–	1
Army		–		7	–	1	–	0
Rutgers		–		7	–	1	–	1
Penn		–		9	–	2	–	0
Brown		–		8	–	2	–	0
Fordham		–		7	–	2	–	0
Lehigh		–		7	–	2	–	0
Boston College		–		6	–	2	–	0
Swarthmore		–		6	–	2	–	0
Washington & Jefferson		–		7	–	3	–	0
Colgate		–		4	–	2	–	0
Harvard		–		3	–	1	–	3
New Hampshire		–		3	–	2	–	2
Dartmouth		–		5	–	3	–	0
Geneva		–		5	–	3	–	1
Penn State		–		5	–	4	–	0
Buffalo		–		4	–	4	–	0
NYU		–		2	–	2	–	3
Tufts		–		3	–	3	–	0
Carnegie Tech		–		2	–	3	–	1
Bucknell		–		3	–	5	–	1
Lafayette		–		3	–	5	–	0
Holy Cross		–		3	–	4	–	0
Rhode Island State		–		2	–	4	–	2
Carlisle		–		3	–	6	–	0
Columbia		–		2	–	4	–	0
Delaware		–		2	–	5	–	0
Cornell		–		3	–	6	–	0
Franklin & Marshall		–		2	–	6	–	0
Villanova		–		0	–	3	–	2
Temple		–		0	–	6	–	1

The 1917 Williams Ephs football team represented Williams College as an independent during the 1917 college football season. In their first and only season under head coach Mysterious Walker, the Ephs compiled a record of 7–0–1. Quarterback Benny Boynton led the squad to its first undefeated record. Boynton scored all the points in a 9–6 defeat of Columbia.

== Schedule ==
Date	Opponent	Site	Result	Source
September 29	RPI	Weston Field; Williamstown, MA	W 20–0	
October 6	at Union (NY)	Schenectady, NY	W 13–6	
October 13	at Cornell	Schoellkopf Field; Ithaca, NY	W 14–10	
October 20	Hamilton	Weston Field; Williamstown, MA	W 12–0	
October 27	at Columbia	South Field; New York, NY	W 9-6	
November 3	at Wesleyan	Middletown, CT	T 0–0	
November 10	Middlebury	Weston Field; Williamstown, MA	W 39–7	
November 17	Amherst	Weston Field; Williamstown, MA (rivalry)	W 20–0	
