= 1917 Penn State Nittany Lions football team =

American college football season

1917 Penn State Nittany Lions football
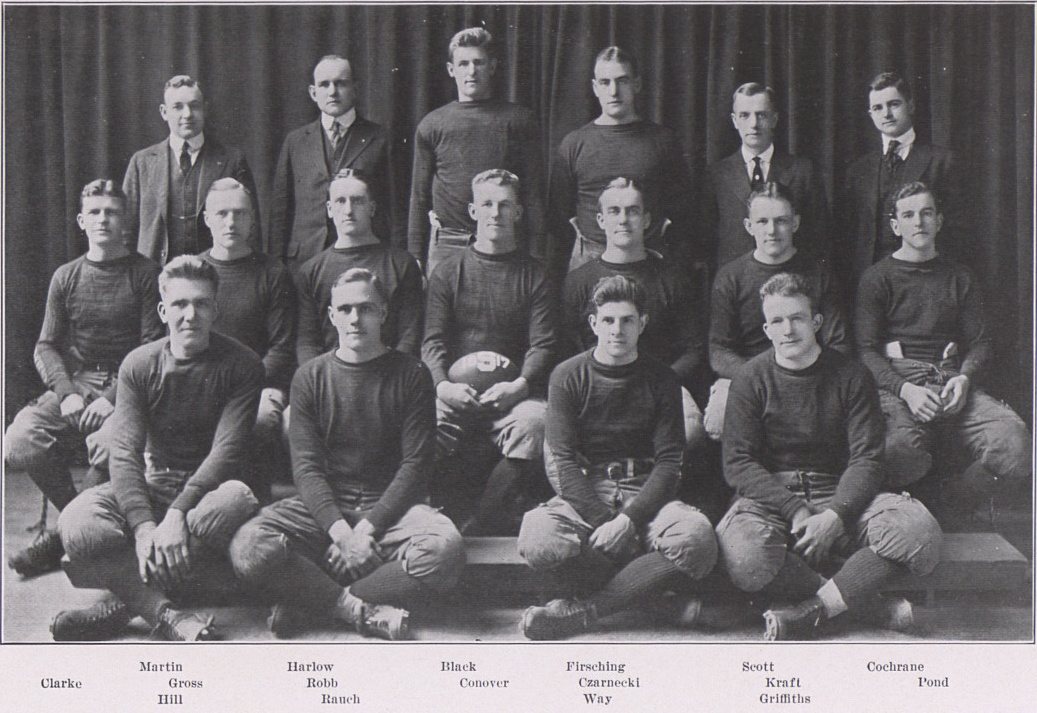
- Conference: Independent
- Record: 5–4
- Head coach: Dick Harlow (3rd season)
- Captains: Larry Conover; Bob Higgins
- Home stadium: New Beaver Field

1917 Eastern college football independents records
	Conf.			Overall
Team	W	L	T	W		L		T
Pittsburgh		–		10	–	0	–	0
Williams		–		7	–	0	–	1
Yale		–		3	–	0	–	0
Princeton		–		2	–	0	–	0
Syracuse		–		8	–	1	–	1
Army		–		7	–	1	–	0
Rutgers		–		7	–	1	–	1
Penn		–		9	–	2	–	0
Brown		–		8	–	2	–	0
Fordham		–		7	–	2	–	0
Lehigh		–		7	–	2	–	0
Boston College		–		6	–	2	–	0
Swarthmore		–		6	–	2	–	0
Washington & Jefferson		–		7	–	3	–	0
Colgate		–		4	–	2	–	0
Harvard		–		3	–	1	–	3
New Hampshire		–		3	–	2	–	2
Dartmouth		–		5	–	3	–	0
Geneva		–		5	–	3	–	1
Penn State		–		5	–	4	–	0
Buffalo		–		4	–	4	–	0
NYU		–		2	–	2	–	3
Tufts		–		3	–	3	–	0
Carnegie Tech		–		2	–	3	–	1
Bucknell		–		3	–	5	–	1
Lafayette		–		3	–	5	–	0
Holy Cross		–		3	–	4	–	0
Rhode Island State		–		2	–	4	–	2
Carlisle		–		3	–	6	–	0
Columbia		–		2	–	4	–	0
Delaware		–		2	–	5	–	0
Cornell		–		3	–	6	–	0
Franklin & Marshall		–		2	–	6	–	0
Villanova		–		0	–	3	–	2
Temple		–		0	–	6	–	1

The 1917 Penn State Nittany Lions football team represented the Pennsylvania State College as an independent during the 1917 college football season. The team was led by third-year head coach Dick Harlow, with Lawrence Whitney as an assistant coach, his final season. The Nittany Lions played their home games at New Beaver Field in State College, Pennsylvania.

== Schedule ==
Date	Opponent	Site	Result	Attendance	Source
September 29	vs. Army Ambulance Corps	Allentown, PA	W 10–0		
October 6	Gettysburg	New Beaver Field; State College, PA	W 80–0		
October 13	St. Bonaventure	New Beaver Field; State College, PA	W 99–0		
October 20	at Washington & Jefferson	Washington Fairgrounds; Washington, PA	L 0–7		
October 27	West Virginia Wesleyan	New Beaver Field; State College, PA	W 8–7		
November 3	at Dartmouth	Memorial Field; Hanover, NH	L 7–10		
November 10	Lehigh	New Beaver Field; State College, PA	L 0–9		
November 17	Maryland	New Beaver Field; State College, PA (rivalry)	W 57–0		
November 29	at Pittsburgh	Forbes Field; Pittsburgh, PA (rivalry)	L 6–28	20,000	
