= 1917 Bucknell football team =

American college football season

1917 Bucknell football
- Conference: Independent
- Record: 3–5–1
- Head coach: George Johnson (3rd season)

1917 Eastern college football independents records
	Conf.			Overall
Team	W	L	T	W		L		T
Pittsburgh		–		10	–	0	–	0
Williams		–		7	–	0	–	1
Yale		–		3	–	0	–	0
Princeton		–		2	–	0	–	0
Syracuse		–		8	–	1	–	1
Army		–		7	–	1	–	0
Rutgers		–		7	–	1	–	1
Penn		–		9	–	2	–	0
Brown		–		8	–	2	–	0
Fordham		–		7	–	2	–	0
Lehigh		–		7	–	2	–	0
Boston College		–		6	–	2	–	0
Swarthmore		–		6	–	2	–	0
Washington & Jefferson		–		7	–	3	–	0
Colgate		–		4	–	2	–	0
Harvard		–		3	–	1	–	3
New Hampshire		–		3	–	2	–	2
Dartmouth		–		5	–	3	–	0
Geneva		–		5	–	3	–	1
Penn State		–		5	–	4	–	0
Buffalo		–		4	–	4	–	0
NYU		–		2	–	2	–	3
Tufts		–		3	–	3	–	0
Carnegie Tech		–		2	–	3	–	1
Bucknell		–		3	–	5	–	1
Lafayette		–		3	–	5	–	0
Holy Cross		–		3	–	4	–	0
Rhode Island State		–		2	–	4	–	2
Carlisle		–		3	–	6	–	0
Columbia		–		2	–	4	–	0
Delaware		–		2	–	5	–	0
Cornell		–		3	–	6	–	0
Franklin & Marshall		–		2	–	6	–	0
Villanova		–		0	–	3	–	2
Temple		–		0	–	6	–	1

The 1917 Bucknell football team was an American football team that represented Bucknell University as an independent during the 1917 college football season. In its third and final season under head coach George Johnson, the team compiled a 3–5–1 record.

== Schedule ==
Date	Opponent	Site	Result	Attendance	Source
September 29	Mansfield Normal	Lewisburg, PA	W 25–0		
October 6	Swarthmore	Lewisburg, PA	W 16–7		
October 13	at Colgate	Utica, NY	L 0–24		
October 20	at Penn	Franklin Field; Philadelphia, PA	L 6–20	5,000	
October 27	at Cornell	Schoellkopf Field; Ithaca, NY	L 0–20		
November 3	Carlisle	Lewisburg, PA	W 10–0		
November 10	at Syracuse	Archbold Stadium; Syracuse, NY	L 0–42		
November 17	vs. Gettysburg	Harrisburg, PA	T 6–6		
November 29	at Dickinson	Carlisle, PA	L 0–7		
