= 1917 Fordham Maroon football team =

American college football season

1917 Fordham Maroon football
- Conference: Independent
- Record: 22–3 / 7–2
- Head coach: Frank Gargan & Frank McCaffrey (1st season)
- Captains: Bulger Lowe; James Conklin; James Kendricks
- Home stadium: Fordham Field

1917 Eastern college football independents records
| | Conf. | | | Overall |
| Team | W | L | T | W | | L | | T |
|---|---|---|---|---|---|---|---|---|
| Pittsburgh | | – | | 10 | – | 0 | – | 0 |
| Williams | | – | | 7 | – | 0 | – | 1 |
| Yale | | – | | 3 | – | 0 | – | 0 |
| Princeton | | – | | 2 | – | 0 | – | 0 |
| Syracuse | | – | | 8 | – | 1 | – | 1 |
| Army | | – | | 7 | – | 1 | – | 0 |
| Rutgers | | – | | 7 | – | 1 | – | 1 |
| Penn | | – | | 9 | – | 2 | – | 0 |
| Brown | | – | | 8 | – | 2 | – | 0 |
| Fordham | | – | | 7 | – | 2 | – | 0 |
| Lehigh | | – | | 7 | – | 2 | – | 0 |
| Boston College | | – | | 6 | – | 2 | – | 0 |
| Swarthmore | | – | | 6 | – | 2 | – | 0 |
| Washington & Jefferson | | – | | 7 | – | 3 | – | 0 |
| Colgate | | – | | 4 | – | 2 | – | 0 |
| Harvard | | – | | 3 | – | 1 | – | 3 |
| New Hampshire | | – | | 3 | – | 2 | – | 2 |
| Dartmouth | | – | | 5 | – | 3 | – | 0 |
| Geneva | | – | | 5 | – | 3 | – | 1 |
| Penn State | | – | | 5 | – | 4 | – | 0 |
| Buffalo | | – | | 4 | – | 4 | – | 0 |
| NYU | | – | | 2 | – | 2 | – | 3 |
| Tufts | | – | | 3 | – | 3 | – | 0 |
| Carnegie Tech | | – | | 2 | – | 3 | – | 1 |
| Bucknell | | – | | 3 | – | 5 | – | 1 |
| Lafayette | | – | | 3 | – | 5 | – | 0 |
| Holy Cross | | – | | 3 | – | 4 | – | 0 |
| Rhode Island State | | – | | 2 | – | 4 | – | 2 |
| Carlisle | | – | | 3 | – | 6 | – | 0 |
| Columbia | | – | | 2 | – | 4 | – | 0 |
| Delaware | | – | | 2 | – | 5 | – | 0 |
| Cornell | | – | | 3 | – | 6 | – | 0 |
| Franklin & Marshall | | – | | 2 | – | 6 | – | 0 |
| Villanova | | – | | 0 | – | 3 | – | 2 |
| Temple | | – | | 0 | – | 6 | – | 1 |

The 1917 Fordham Maroon football team was an American football team that represented Fordham University as an independent during the 1917 college football season. Fordham claims a 22–3 record. College Football Data Warehouse (CFDW) lists the team's record at 7–2. Opponents recognized by CFDW are displayed in bold in the schedule chart below.

Frank Gargan and Frank McCaffrey were the team's coaches. Left halfback Frankie Frisch, known as "The Fordham Flash", led the team on offense. He later played for 19 years in Major League Baseball from 1919 to 1937 and was inducted into the Baseball Hall of Fame. Bulger Lowe played his only season with the university as a tackle and was one of the team captains, becoming the first player from the school to play pro-football when in 1920, he was drafted.

== Schedule ==
| Date | Time | Opponent | Site | Result | Source |
|---|---|---|---|---|---|
| September 29 | | **Fort Wadsworth** | Fordham Field; Bronx, NY | W 35–0 | |
| October 5 | | vs. **U.S. Ambulance Corps** | Muhlenberg Field; Allentown, PA | W 19–7 | |
| October 13 | | **Norwich** | Fordham Field; Bronx, NY | W 60–0 | |
| October 20 | | **Holy Cross** | Fordham Field; Bronx, NY (rivalry) | W 12–0 | |
| October 27 | | **Rutgers** | Fordham Field; Bronx, NY | L 0–28 | |
| November 6 | 2:30 p.m. | **Georgetown** | Fordham Field; Bronx, NY | L 0–12 | |
| November 17 | | at **Cornell** | Schoellkopf Field; Ithaca, NY | W 27–6 | |
| November 24 | | **Pelham Bay 3rd Naval District** | Fordham Field; Bronx, NY | W 28–0 | |
| November 29 | | **Camp Upton** | Fordham Field; Bronx, NY | W 35–0 | |
| | | USS Arkansas | | W 35–0 | |
| | | USS Texas | | W 30–0 | |
| | | USS Wyoming | | W 14–0 | |
| | | US Training Station, Bayshore | | W 10–7 | |
| | | Mitchell Field Aviators | | L 0–7 | |
| | | Camp Upton | | W 42–10 | |
| | | Camp Merritt | | W 10–7 | |
| | | 302nd Engineers | | W 35–13 | |
| | | Army Plebes | | W 10–6 | |
| | | Fort HG Wright | | W 21–0 | |
| | | Fort HG Wright | | W 10–7 | |
