= 1917 Rhode Island State football team =

American college football season

1917 Rhode Island State football
- Conference: Independent
- Record: 2–4–2
- Head coach: James A. Baldwin (3rd season)

1917 Eastern college football independents records
	Conf.			Overall
Team	W	L	T	W		L		T
Pittsburgh		–		10	–	0	–	0
Williams		–		7	–	0	–	1
Yale		–		3	–	0	–	0
Princeton		–		2	–	0	–	0
Syracuse		–		8	–	1	–	1
Army		–		7	–	1	–	0
Rutgers		–		7	–	1	–	1
Penn		–		9	–	2	–	0
Brown		–		8	–	2	–	0
Fordham		–		7	–	2	–	0
Lehigh		–		7	–	2	–	0
Boston College		–		6	–	2	–	0
Swarthmore		–		6	–	2	–	0
Washington & Jefferson		–		7	–	3	–	0
Colgate		–		4	–	2	–	0
Harvard		–		3	–	1	–	3
New Hampshire		–		3	–	2	–	2
Dartmouth		–		5	–	3	–	0
Geneva		–		5	–	3	–	1
Penn State		–		5	–	4	–	0
Buffalo		–		4	–	4	–	0
NYU		–		2	–	2	–	3
Tufts		–		3	–	3	–	0
Carnegie Tech		–		2	–	3	–	1
Bucknell		–		3	–	5	–	1
Lafayette		–		3	–	5	–	0
Holy Cross		–		3	–	4	–	0
Rhode Island State		–		2	–	4	–	2
Carlisle		–		3	–	6	–	0
Columbia		–		2	–	4	–	0
Delaware		–		2	–	5	–	0
Cornell		–		3	–	6	–	0
Franklin & Marshall		–		2	–	6	–	0
Villanova		–		0	–	3	–	2
Temple		–		0	–	6	–	1

The 1917 Rhode Island State football team was an American football team that represented Rhode Island State College (later renamed the University of Rhode Island) as an independent during the 1917 college football season. In its third and final year under head coach James A. Baldwin, the team compiled a 2–4–2 record.

== Schedule ==
Date	Opponent	Site	Result	Source
September 29	at Brown	Andrews Field; Providence, RI (rivalry)	L 0–27	
October 6	at Wesleyan	Andrus Field; Middletown, CT	T 0–0	
October 13	at Worcester Tech	Worcester, MA	W 30–0	
October 20	New Hampshire	Kingston, RI	T 0–0	
October 27	at Holy Cross	Fitton Field; Worcester, MA	L 0–13	
November 3	at Boston College	Alumni Field; Chestnut Hill, MA	L 0–48	
November 10	at NYU	Ohio Field; Bronx, NY	L 6–9	
November 17	Fort Kearney		W 12–0	
