= George Johnson (American football coach) =

American football coach

Coaching career (HC unless noted)
- ?–1914: Northeast HS (PA)
- 1915–1917: Bucknell

Head coaching record
- Overall: 8–20–4 (college)

George Johnson was an American football coach. He served as the head football coach at Bucknell University from 1915 to 1917, compiling a record of 8–20–4. Johnson coached football at Northeast High School in Philadelphia before succeeding George Cockill as head football coach at Bucknell in 1915.

== Head coaching record ==
=== College ===
Year	Team	Overall	Conference	Standing	Bowl/playoffs
Bucknell (Independent) (1915–1917)
1915	Bucknell	2–6–3			
1916	Bucknell	3–9			
1917	Bucknell	3–5–1			
Bucknell:		8–20–4			
Total:		8–20–4			
