= 1917 Holy Cross football team =

American college football season

1917 Holy Cross football
- Conference: Independent
- Record: 3–4
- Head coach: Luke Kelly (4th season)
- Captain: Raymond Lynch
- Home stadium: Fitton Field

1917 Eastern college football independents records
	Conf.			Overall
Team	W	L	T	W		L		T
Pittsburgh		–		10	–	0	–	0
Williams		–		7	–	0	–	1
Yale		–		3	–	0	–	0
Princeton		–		2	–	0	–	0
Syracuse		–		8	–	1	–	1
Army		–		7	–	1	–	0
Rutgers		–		7	–	1	–	1
Penn		–		9	–	2	–	0
Brown		–		8	–	2	–	0
Fordham		–		7	–	2	–	0
Lehigh		–		7	–	2	–	0
Boston College		–		6	–	2	–	0
Swarthmore		–		6	–	2	–	0
Washington & Jefferson		–		7	–	3	–	0
Colgate		–		4	–	2	–	0
Harvard		–		3	–	1	–	3
New Hampshire		–		3	–	2	–	2
Dartmouth		–		5	–	3	–	0
Geneva		–		5	–	3	–	1
Penn State		–		5	–	4	–	0
Buffalo		–		4	–	4	–	0
NYU		–		2	–	2	–	3
Tufts		–		3	–	3	–	0
Carnegie Tech		–		2	–	3	–	1
Bucknell		–		3	–	5	–	1
Lafayette		–		3	–	5	–	0
Holy Cross		–		3	–	4	–	0
Rhode Island State		–		2	–	4	–	2
Carlisle		–		3	–	6	–	0
Columbia		–		2	–	4	–	0
Delaware		–		2	–	5	–	0
Cornell		–		3	–	6	–	0
Franklin & Marshall		–		2	–	6	–	0
Villanova		–		0	–	3	–	2
Temple		–		0	–	6	–	1

The 1917 Holy Cross football team was an American football team that represented the College of the Holy Cross in the 1917 college football season.

The team compiled a 3–4 record in its fourth and final year under head coach Luke Kelly, who had stepped down after the 1916 season, but returned after his successor, Frank Cavanaugh, entered the United States Army. Raymond Lynch was the team captain for the second consecutive year.

Holy Cross played its home games at Fitton Field on the college campus in Worcester, Massachusetts.

== Schedule ==
Date	Opponent	Site	Result	Attendance	Source
October 12	Brown	Fitton Field; Worcester, MA	L 6–27		
October 20	at Fordham	Fordham Field; Bronx, NY (rivalry)	L 0–12		
October 27	Rhode Island State	Fitton Field; Worcester, MA	W 13–0		
November 3	at Colgate	Utica, NY	L 0–21		
November 10	at Boston College	Fenway Park; Boston, MA (rivalry)	L 6–34	5,000	
November 17	Rensselaer	Fitton Field; Worcester, MA	W 41–13		
November 29	Springfield YMCA	Fitton Field; Worcester, MA	W 13–7		
