= 1917 Buffalo Bisons football team =

American college football season

1917 Buffalo Bisons football
- Conference: Independent
- Record: 4–4
- Head coach: Art Powell (2nd season)
- Captain: William Hayes
- Home stadium: International Park

1917 Eastern college football independents records
	Conf.			Overall
Team	W	L	T	W		L		T
Pittsburgh		–		10	–	0	–	0
Williams		–		7	–	0	–	1
Yale		–		3	–	0	–	0
Princeton		–		2	–	0	–	0
Syracuse		–		8	–	1	–	1
Army		–		7	–	1	–	0
Rutgers		–		7	–	1	–	1
Penn		–		9	–	2	–	0
Brown		–		8	–	2	–	0
Fordham		–		7	–	2	–	0
Lehigh		–		7	–	2	–	0
Boston College		–		6	–	2	–	0
Swarthmore		–		6	–	2	–	0
Washington & Jefferson		–		7	–	3	–	0
Colgate		–		4	–	2	–	0
Harvard		–		3	–	1	–	3
New Hampshire		–		3	–	2	–	2
Dartmouth		–		5	–	3	–	0
Geneva		–		5	–	3	–	1
Penn State		–		5	–	4	–	0
Buffalo		–		4	–	4	–	0
NYU		–		2	–	2	–	3
Tufts		–		3	–	3	–	0
Carnegie Tech		–		2	–	3	–	1
Bucknell		–		3	–	5	–	1
Lafayette		–		3	–	5	–	0
Holy Cross		–		3	–	4	–	0
Rhode Island State		–		2	–	4	–	2
Carlisle		–		3	–	6	–	0
Columbia		–		2	–	4	–	0
Delaware		–		2	–	5	–	0
Cornell		–		3	–	6	–	0
Franklin & Marshall		–		2	–	6	–	0
Villanova		–		0	–	3	–	2
Temple		–		0	–	6	–	1

The 1917 Buffalo Bisons football team represented the University of Buffalo as an independent during the 1917 college football season. Led by Art Powell in his second season as head coach, the team compiled a record of 444.

== Schedule ==
Date	Time	Opponent	Site	Result	Source
October 13	3:00 p.m.	Mansfield	International Park; Buffalo, NY	W 12–6	
October 20		at Rochester	Rochester, NY	W 28–0	
October 27		St. Bonaventure	International Park; Buffalo, NY	L 6–13	
November 6		Westminster (PA)	International Park; Buffalo, NY	L 0–7	
November 10		Hamilton	International Park; Buffalo, NY	L 0–7	
November 17		Thiel	International Park; Buffalo, NY	W 27–7	
November 24		at Detroit	Navin Field; Detroit, MI	L 7–20	
November 29		Hobart	International Park; Buffalo, NY	W 45–0	
