= 1917 Brown Bears football team =

American college football season

1917 Brown Bears football
- Conference: Independent
- Record: 8–2
- Head coach: Edward N. Robinson (16th season)
- Captain: V. A. Bowman
- Home stadium: Andrews Field

1917 Eastern college football independents records
	Conf.			Overall
Team	W	L	T	W		L		T
Pittsburgh		–		10	–	0	–	0
Williams		–		7	–	0	–	1
Yale		–		3	–	0	–	0
Princeton		–		2	–	0	–	0
Syracuse		–		8	–	1	–	1
Army		–		7	–	1	–	0
Rutgers		–		7	–	1	–	1
Penn		–		9	–	2	–	0
Brown		–		8	–	2	–	0
Fordham		–		7	–	2	–	0
Lehigh		–		7	–	2	–	0
Boston College		–		6	–	2	–	0
Swarthmore		–		6	–	2	–	0
Washington & Jefferson		–		7	–	3	–	0
Colgate		–		4	–	2	–	0
Harvard		–		3	–	1	–	3
New Hampshire		–		3	–	2	–	2
Dartmouth		–		5	–	3	–	0
Geneva		–		5	–	3	–	1
Penn State		–		5	–	4	–	0
Buffalo		–		4	–	4	–	0
NYU		–		2	–	2	–	3
Tufts		–		3	–	3	–	0
Carnegie Tech		–		2	–	3	–	1
Bucknell		–		3	–	5	–	1
Lafayette		–		3	–	5	–	0
Holy Cross		–		3	–	4	–	0
Rhode Island State		–		2	–	4	–	2
Carlisle		–		3	–	6	–	0
Columbia		–		2	–	4	–	0
Delaware		–		2	–	5	–	0
Cornell		–		3	–	6	–	0
Franklin & Marshall		–		2	–	6	–	0
Villanova		–		0	–	3	–	2
Temple		–		0	–	6	–	1

The 1917 Brown Bears football team was an American football team that represented Brown University as an independent during the 1917 college football season. In its 16th season under head coach Edward N. Robinson, Brown compiled an 8–2 and outscored opponents by a total of 160 to 62.

== Schedule ==
Date	Opponent	Site	Result	Attendance	Source
September 29	Rhode Island State	Andrews Field; Providence, RI (rivalry)	W 27–0		
October 6	Johns Hopkins	Andrews Field; Providence, RI	W 20–0		
October 12	at Holy Cross	Fitton Field; Worcester, MA	W 27–6		
October 20	Boston College	Andrews Field; Providence, RI	W 7–2		
October 27	Colgate	Andrews Field; Providence, RI	W 7–6		
November 3	Syracuse	Andrews Field; Providence, RI	L 0–6	5,000	
November 10	Newport Naval Reserves	Andrews Field; Providence, RI	L 0–35		
November 14	Camp Devens	Andrews Field; Providence, RI	W 40–0		
November 17	Colby	Andrews Field; Providence, RI	W 19–7		
November 24	vs. Dartmouth	Braves Field; Boston, MA	W 13–0		
