= 1917 Columbia Lions football team =

American college football season

1917 Columbia Lions football
- Conference: Independent
- Record: 2–4
- Head coach: T. Nelson Metcalf (3rd season)
- Captain: D. A. Cochran
- Home stadium: South Field

1917 Eastern college football independents records
	Conf.			Overall
Team	W	L	T	W		L		T
Pittsburgh		–		10	–	0	–	0
Williams		–		7	–	0	–	1
Yale		–		3	–	0	–	0
Princeton		–		2	–	0	–	0
Syracuse		–		8	–	1	–	1
Army		–		7	–	1	–	0
Rutgers		–		7	–	1	–	1
Penn		–		9	–	2	–	0
Brown		–		8	–	2	–	0
Fordham		–		7	–	2	–	0
Lehigh		–		7	–	2	–	0
Boston College		–		6	–	2	–	0
Swarthmore		–		6	–	2	–	0
Washington & Jefferson		–		7	–	3	–	0
Colgate		–		4	–	2	–	0
Harvard		–		3	–	1	–	3
New Hampshire		–		3	–	2	–	2
Dartmouth		–		5	–	3	–	0
Geneva		–		5	–	3	–	1
Penn State		–		5	–	4	–	0
Buffalo		–		4	–	4	–	0
NYU		–		2	–	2	–	3
Tufts		–		3	–	3	–	0
Carnegie Tech		–		2	–	3	–	1
Bucknell		–		3	–	5	–	1
Lafayette		–		3	–	5	–	0
Holy Cross		–		3	–	4	–	0
Rhode Island State		–		2	–	4	–	2
Carlisle		–		3	–	6	–	0
Columbia		–		2	–	4	–	0
Delaware		–		2	–	5	–	0
Cornell		–		3	–	6	–	0
Franklin & Marshall		–		2	–	6	–	0
Villanova		–		0	–	3	–	2
Temple		–		0	–	6	–	1

The 1917 Columbia Lions football team was an American football team that represented Columbia University as an independent during the 1917 college football season. In his third and final season as head coach, T. Nelson Metcalf led the team to a 2–4 record, though the Lions outscored opponents 110 to 38. The team played its home games on South Field, part of the university's campus in Morningside Heights in Upper Manhattan.

== Schedule ==
Date	Opponent	Site	Result	Attendance	Source
October 20	Union (NY)	South Field; New York, NY	W 21–0		
October 27	Williams	South Field; New York, NY	L 6–9		
November 3	Amherst	South Field; New York, NY	L 6–14		
November 10	Hobart	South Field; New York, NY	W 70–0		
November 17	Wesleyan	South Field; New York, NY	L 0–6	8,000	
November 24	NYU	South Field; New York, NY	L 7–9		
