= 1917 Washington & Jefferson Red and Black football team =

American college football season

1917 Washington & Jefferson Red and Black football
- Conference: Independent
- Record: 7–3
- Head coach: Sol Metzger (2nd season)

1917 Eastern college football independents records
	Conf.			Overall
Team	W	L	T	W		L		T
Pittsburgh		–		10	–	0	–	0
Williams		–		7	–	0	–	1
Yale		–		3	–	0	–	0
Princeton		–		2	–	0	–	0
Syracuse		–		8	–	1	–	1
Army		–		7	–	1	–	0
Rutgers		–		7	–	1	–	1
Penn		–		9	–	2	–	0
Brown		–		8	–	2	–	0
Fordham		–		7	–	2	–	0
Lehigh		–		7	–	2	–	0
Boston College		–		6	–	2	–	0
Swarthmore		–		6	–	2	–	0
Washington & Jefferson		–		7	–	3	–	0
Colgate		–		4	–	2	–	0
Harvard		–		3	–	1	–	3
New Hampshire		–		3	–	2	–	2
Dartmouth		–		5	–	3	–	0
Geneva		–		5	–	3	–	1
Penn State		–		5	–	4	–	0
Buffalo		–		4	–	4	–	0
NYU		–		2	–	2	–	3
Tufts		–		3	–	3	–	0
Carnegie Tech		–		2	–	3	–	1
Bucknell		–		3	–	5	–	1
Lafayette		–		3	–	5	–	0
Holy Cross		–		3	–	4	–	0
Rhode Island State		–		2	–	4	–	2
Carlisle		–		3	–	6	–	0
Columbia		–		2	–	4	–	0
Delaware		–		2	–	5	–	0
Cornell		–		3	–	6	–	0
Franklin & Marshall		–		2	–	6	–	0
Villanova		–		0	–	3	–	2
Temple		–		0	–	6	–	1

The 1917 Washington & Jefferson Red and Black football team represented Washington & Jefferson College as an independent during the 1917 college football season. Led by Sol Metzger in his second and final year as head coach, Washington & Jefferson compiled a record of 7–3.

== Schedule ==
Date	Time	Opponent	Site	Result	Attendance	Source
September 29		The Kiski School	Washington, PA	W 17–7		
October 6		Westminster (PA)	Washington, PA	W 36–0		
October 13		West Virginia Wesleyan	Washington, PA	W 13–6		
October 20		Penn State	Washington, PA	W 7–0		
October 27		at Geneva	Beaver Falls, PA	W 35–0		
November 10	2:30 p.m.	at Pittsburgh	Forbes Field; Pittsburgh, PA	L 10–13	25,000	
November 17		vs. West Virginia	Fairmont, WV	L 0–7		
November 24		Notre Dame	Washington, PA	L 0–3		
November 29		vs. Washington and Lee	Boulevard Field; Richmond, VA	W 12–0		
December 1		vs. Camp Sherman	Swayne Field; Toledo, OH	W 7–0		
