= Wingate Rollins =

American football player and coach (1894–1969)

Biographical details
- Born: September 17, 1894; Boston, Massachusetts, U.S.
- Died: March 9, 1978 (aged 83); Milton, Massachusetts, U.S.
- Education: Harvard College; Massachusetts Institute of Technology

Playing career
- 1912–1915: Harvard
- Position: Running back

Coaching career (HC unless noted)
- 1916: Harvard (freshmen)
- 1917: Harvard

Head coaching record
- Overall: 3–1–3

Wingate "Wink" Rollins (September 17, 1894 – March 9, 1978) was an American athlete and coach at the Harvard University. He served as the head football coach at Harvard for one season, in 1917.

== Early life ==
Rollins was born on September 17, 1894, in the West Roxbury neighborhood of Boston, to James Wingate and Clara Boyden (Clark) Rollins. His father was a civil engineer and a partner of the firm Holbrook, Cabot and Rollins. Rollins was captain of the Roxbury Latin School football team and was a Boston Athletic Association track and field and swimming champion.

== Harvard ==
Rollins was a reserve back on the Harvard Crimson football team and excelled in the 40-yard dash and shot-put. He graduated in 1916 and attended the Citizens' Military Training Camp in Plattsburgh, New York that summer. He returned to Cambridge, Massachusetts that fall as a student at Massachusetts Institute of Technology and coach of the Harvard freshman football team. He was also a member of the United States Navy aviation detachment at MIT. He was the head coach of the 1917 Harvard "informal" varsity football team. On March 23, 1918, he married Ruth Whittier. He served as Harvard's head football coach during 1919 spring practice. He graduated with a degree in engineering administration in 1919.

== Later life ==
After a stint with the E. H. Rollins investment bank, Rollins went to work in the engineering contracting business. Ruth Whittier Rollins died on May 21, 1968. His second wife, Sarabelle (Gilbert) Rollins, died on October 25, 1975. Rollins died on March 9, 1978. He was survived by two children and thirteen grandchildren. He was interred in Milton Cemetery.

== Head coaching record ==
Year	Team	Overall	Conference	Standing	Bowl/playoffs
Harvard Crimson (Independent) (1917)
1917	Harvard	3–1–3			
Harvard:		3–1–3			
Total:		3–1–3			
