= 1917 Geneva Covenanters football team =

American college football season

1917 Geneva Covenanters football
- Conference: Independent
- Record: 5–3–1
- Head coach: Philip Henry Bridenbaugh (1st season)

1917 Eastern college football independents records
	Conf.			Overall
Team	W	L	T	W		L		T
Pittsburgh		–		10	–	0	–	0
Williams		–		7	–	0	–	1
Yale		–		3	–	0	–	0
Princeton		–		2	–	0	–	0
Syracuse		–		8	–	1	–	1
Army		–		7	–	1	–	0
Rutgers		–		7	–	1	–	1
Penn		–		9	–	2	–	0
Brown		–		8	–	2	–	0
Fordham		–		7	–	2	–	0
Lehigh		–		7	–	2	–	0
Boston College		–		6	–	2	–	0
Swarthmore		–		6	–	2	–	0
Washington & Jefferson		–		7	–	3	–	0
Colgate		–		4	–	2	–	0
Harvard		–		3	–	1	–	3
New Hampshire		–		3	–	2	–	2
Dartmouth		–		5	–	3	–	0
Geneva		–		5	–	3	–	1
Penn State		–		5	–	4	–	0
Buffalo		–		4	–	4	–	0
NYU		–		2	–	2	–	3
Tufts		–		3	–	3	–	0
Carnegie Tech		–		2	–	3	–	1
Bucknell		–		3	–	5	–	1
Lafayette		–		3	–	5	–	0
Holy Cross		–		3	–	4	–	0
Rhode Island State		–		2	–	4	–	2
Carlisle		–		3	–	6	–	0
Columbia		–		2	–	4	–	0
Delaware		–		2	–	5	–	0
Cornell		–		3	–	6	–	0
Franklin & Marshall		–		2	–	6	–	0
Villanova		–		0	–	3	–	2
Temple		–		0	–	6	–	1

The 1917 Geneva Covenanters football team was an American football team that represented Geneva College as an independent during the 1917 college football season. Led by first-year head coach Philip Henry Bridenbaugh, the team compiled a record of 5–3–1.

== Schedule ==
Date	Time	Opponent	Site	Result	Source
September 29	3:00 p.m.	at Thiel	Parkard Park; Greenville, PA	W 3–0	
October 6		St. Bonaventure	Beaver Falls, PA	W 32–0	
October 13		Barnetts	Beaver Falls, PA	W 17–9	
October 20		at Allegheny	Meadville, PA	L 0–39	
October 27		Washington & Jefferson	Beaver Falls, PA	L 0–35	
November 3		Grove City	Beaver Falls, PA	T 7–7	
November 10		Westminster (PA)	Beaver Falls, PA	W 23–7	
November 17		Bethany (WV)	Beaver Falls, PA	L 6–25	
November 24		Camp Sherman	Beaver Falls, PA	W 26–0	
All times are in Eastern time
