= 1917 Colgate football team =

American college football season

1917 Colgate football
- Conference: Independent
- Record: 4–2
- Head coach: Harold McDevitt (1st season)
- Captain: Charles Hubbell
- Home stadium: Whitnall Field

1917 Eastern college football independents records
	Conf.			Overall
Team	W	L	T	W		L		T
Pittsburgh		–		10	–	0	–	0
Williams		–		7	–	0	–	1
Yale		–		3	–	0	–	0
Princeton		–		2	–	0	–	0
Syracuse		–		8	–	1	–	1
Army		–		7	–	1	–	0
Rutgers		–		7	–	1	–	1
Penn		–		9	–	2	–	0
Brown		–		8	–	2	–	0
Fordham		–		7	–	2	–	0
Lehigh		–		7	–	2	–	0
Boston College		–		6	–	2	–	0
Swarthmore		–		6	–	2	–	0
Washington & Jefferson		–		7	–	3	–	0
Colgate		–		4	–	2	–	0
Harvard		–		3	–	1	–	3
New Hampshire		–		3	–	2	–	2
Dartmouth		–		5	–	3	–	0
Geneva		–		5	–	3	–	1
Penn State		–		5	–	4	–	0
Buffalo		–		4	–	4	–	0
NYU		–		2	–	2	–	3
Tufts		–		3	–	3	–	0
Carnegie Tech		–		2	–	3	–	1
Bucknell		–		3	–	5	–	1
Lafayette		–		3	–	5	–	0
Holy Cross		–		3	–	4	–	0
Rhode Island State		–		2	–	4	–	2
Carlisle		–		3	–	6	–	0
Columbia		–		2	–	4	–	0
Delaware		–		2	–	5	–	0
Cornell		–		3	–	6	–	0
Franklin & Marshall		–		2	–	6	–	0
Villanova		–		0	–	3	–	2
Temple		–		0	–	6	–	1

The 1917 Colgate football team was an American football team that represented Colgate University as an independent during the 1917 college football season. In its first and only season under head coach Harold McDevitt, the team compiled a 4–2 record and outscored opponents by a total of 118 to 40. Charles Hubbell was the team captain. The team played its home games on Whitnall Field in Hamilton, New York.

== Schedule ==
Date	Opponent	Site	Result	Attendance	Source
October 13	Bucknell	Whitnall Field; Hamilton, NY	W 24–0		
October 20	at Cornell	Schoellkopf Field; Ithaca, NY (rivalry)	W 20–0		
October 27	at Brown	Andrews Field; Providence, RI	L 6–7		
November 3	vs. Holy Cross	Utica, NY	W 21–0		
November 10	St. Bonaventure	Whitnall Field; Hamilton, NY	W 40–6		
November 17	at Syracuse	Syracuse, NY (rivalry)	L 7–16	16,000	
