= 1917 Lafayette football team =

American football club

1917 Lafayette football
- Conference: Independent
- Record: 3–5
- Head coach: Punk Berryman (1st season)
- Captains: Henry Lehr; Grant Scott
- Home stadium: March Field

1917 Eastern college football independents records
	Conf.			Overall
Team	W	L	T	W		L		T
Pittsburgh		–		10	–	0	–	0
Williams		–		7	–	0	–	1
Yale		–		3	–	0	–	0
Princeton		–		2	–	0	–	0
Syracuse		–		8	–	1	–	1
Army		–		7	–	1	–	0
Rutgers		–		7	–	1	–	1
Penn		–		9	–	2	–	0
Brown		–		8	–	2	–	0
Fordham		–		7	–	2	–	0
Lehigh		–		7	–	2	–	0
Boston College		–		6	–	2	–	0
Swarthmore		–		6	–	2	–	0
Washington & Jefferson		–		7	–	3	–	0
Colgate		–		4	–	2	–	0
Harvard		–		3	–	1	–	3
New Hampshire		–		3	–	2	–	2
Dartmouth		–		5	–	3	–	0
Geneva		–		5	–	3	–	1
Penn State		–		5	–	4	–	0
Buffalo		–		4	–	4	–	0
NYU		–		2	–	2	–	3
Tufts		–		3	–	3	–	0
Carnegie Tech		–		2	–	3	–	1
Bucknell		–		3	–	5	–	1
Lafayette		–		3	–	5	–	0
Holy Cross		–		3	–	4	–	0
Rhode Island State		–		2	–	4	–	2
Carlisle		–		3	–	6	–	0
Columbia		–		2	–	4	–	0
Delaware		–		2	–	5	–	0
Cornell		–		3	–	6	–	0
Franklin & Marshall		–		2	–	6	–	0
Villanova		–		0	–	3	–	2
Temple		–		0	–	6	–	1

The 1917 Lafayette football team was an American football team that represented Lafayette College as an independent during the 1917 college football season. In its first and only season under head coach Punk Berryman, the team compiled a 3–5 record. Henry Lehr and Grant Scott were the team captains. The team played its home games at March Field in Easton, Pennsylvania.

== Schedule ==
Date	Opponent	Site	Result	Source
October 6	U.S. Ambulance Corps	March Field; Easton, PA	W 20–0	
October 13	Ursinus	March Field; Easton, PA	W 12–6	
October 20	Rutgers	March Field; Easton, PA	L 7–33	
October 27	Muhlenberg	March Field; Easton, PA	L 0–6	
November 3	at Penn	Franklin Field; Philadelphia, PA	L 0–27	
November 10	at Swarthmore	Swarthmore, PA	L 0–56	
November 17	Albright	March Field; Easton, PA	W 42–0	
November 24	Lehigh	Taylor Stadium; Bethlehem, PA (rivalry)	L 0–17	
