= Francis P. Wall =

American football player and coach

Playing career
- 1915: Boston College

Coaching career (HC unless noted)
- 1917: NYU

Head coaching record
- Overall: 2–2–3

Francis P. Wall was an American college football player and coach. He served as the head football coach at New York University (NYU) for one season in 1917, compiling a record of 2–2–3. Wall played college football at Boston College.

== Head coaching record ==
Year	Team	Overall	Conference	Standing	Bowl/playoffs
NYU Violets (Independent) (1917)
1917	NYU	2–2–3			
NYU:		2–2–3			
Total:		2–2–3			
