= 1917 New Hampshire football team =

American college football season

1917 New Hampshire football
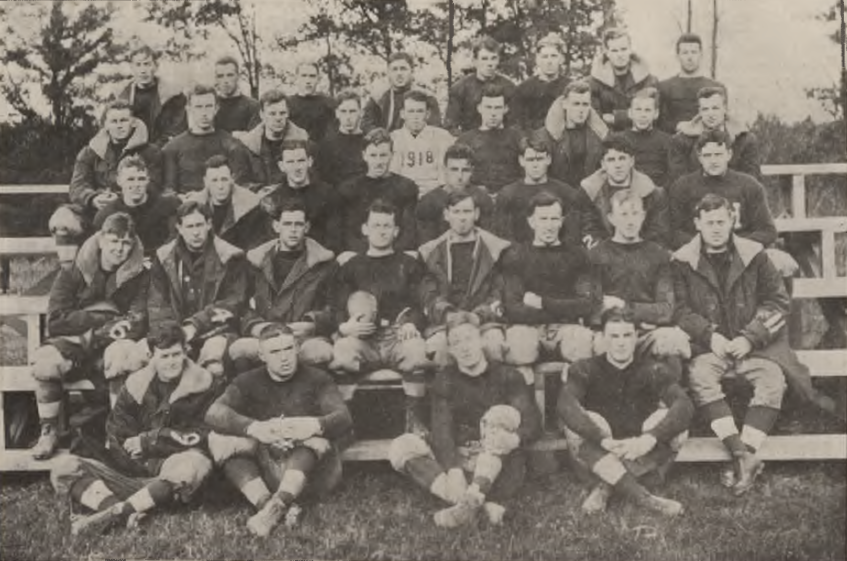
- Conference: Independent
- Record: 3–2–2
- Head coach: Butch Cowell (3rd season)
- Captain: Charles B. Broderick
- Home stadium: College Oval (Note: College Oval (also known as College Field) was New Hampshire's home field through the 1920 season; Memorial Field, dedicated in 1921, was built in the same location.)

1917 Eastern college football independents records
	Conf.			Overall
Team	W	L	T	W		L		T
Pittsburgh		–		10	–	0	–	0
Williams		–		7	–	0	–	1
Yale		–		3	–	0	–	0
Princeton		–		2	–	0	–	0
Syracuse		–		8	–	1	–	1
Army		–		7	–	1	–	0
Rutgers		–		7	–	1	–	1
Penn		–		9	–	2	–	0
Brown		–		8	–	2	–	0
Fordham		–		7	–	2	–	0
Lehigh		–		7	–	2	–	0
Boston College		–		6	–	2	–	0
Swarthmore		–		6	–	2	–	0
Washington & Jefferson		–		7	–	3	–	0
Colgate		–		4	–	2	–	0
Harvard		–		3	–	1	–	3
New Hampshire		–		3	–	2	–	2
Dartmouth		–		5	–	3	–	0
Geneva		–		5	–	3	–	1
Penn State		–		5	–	4	–	0
Buffalo		–		4	–	4	–	0
NYU		–		2	–	2	–	3
Tufts		–		3	–	3	–	0
Carnegie Tech		–		2	–	3	–	1
Bucknell		–		3	–	5	–	1
Lafayette		–		3	–	5	–	0
Holy Cross		–		3	–	4	–	0
Rhode Island State		–		2	–	4	–	2
Carlisle		–		3	–	6	–	0
Columbia		–		2	–	4	–	0
Delaware		–		2	–	5	–	0
Cornell		–		3	–	6	–	0
Franklin & Marshall		–		2	–	6	–	0
Villanova		–		0	–	3	–	2
Temple		–		0	–	6	–	1

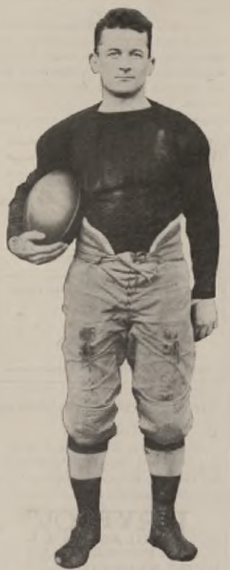
Team captain Charlie Broderick

The 1917 New Hampshire football team (Note: The school did not adopt the Wildcats nickname until February 1926; before then, they were generally referred to as "the blue and white".) was an American football team that represented New Hampshire College of Agriculture and the Mechanic Arts (Note: The school was often referred to as New Hampshire College or New Hampshire State College in newspapers of the era.) during the 1917 college football season—the school became the University of New Hampshire in 1923. In its third season under head coach William "Butch" Cowell, the team compiled a 3–2–2 record, while outscoring their opponents by a total of 129 to 53.

The team initially selected Joseph W. Morrill of Grafton, New Hampshire, as team captain. Due to his enlistment in the United States Navy before the start of the season, Charles B. Broderick, who had played high school football in nearby Exeter, New Hampshire, was selected as the new team captain.

== Schedule ==
Date	Opponent	Site	Result	Attendance	Source
October 13	Fort McKinley	College Oval; Durham, NH	W 23–0		
October 20	at Rhode Island State	Kingston, RI	T 0–0		
October 27	at Dartmouth	Alumni Oval; Hanover, NH (rivalry)	L 6–21		
November 3	at Tufts	Tufts Oval; Medford, MA	L 3–19		
November 10	Maine	Central Park; Dover, NH (rivalry)	W 27–0	2,000+	
November 14	USS Des Moines	College Oval; Durham, NH	T 13–13		‡
November 17	Worcester Tech	College Oval; Durham, NH	W 57–0	1,200	

‡ The game against USS Des Moines is listed as a 13–13 tie by College Football Data Warehouse and the Wildcats' media guide. Two contemporary sources, The New Hampshire college newspaper and The Granite college yearbook, recorded it as a 13–6 win for New Hampshire.

Team captain Charlie Broderick became a high school football coach in Massachusetts, winning 252 games in a 42-year career. He was inducted to the UNH Athletics Hall of Fame in 1983.
