= 1917 Yale Bulldogs football team =

American college football season

1917 Yale Bulldogs football
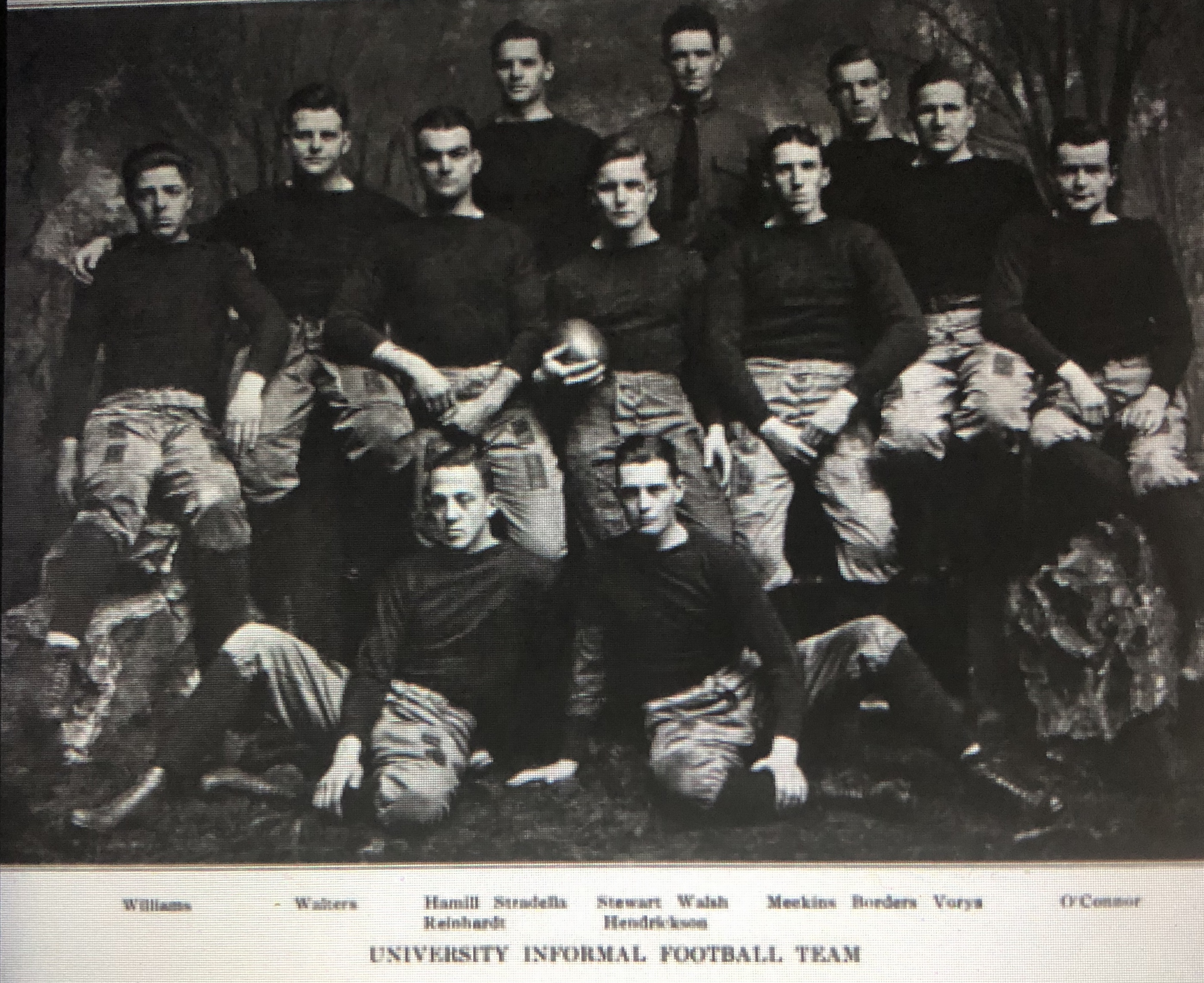
- Conference: Independent
- Record: 3–0
- Head coach: Arthur Brides (1st season)
- Home stadium: Yale Bowl

1917 Eastern college football independents records
	Conf.			Overall
Team	W	L	T	W		L		T
Pittsburgh		–		10	–	0	–	0
Williams		–		7	–	0	–	1
Yale		–		3	–	0	–	0
Princeton		–		2	–	0	–	0
Syracuse		–		8	–	1	–	1
Army		–		7	–	1	–	0
Rutgers		–		7	–	1	–	1
Penn		–		9	–	2	–	0
Brown		–		8	–	2	–	0
Fordham		–		7	–	2	–	0
Lehigh		–		7	–	2	–	0
Boston College		–		6	–	2	–	0
Swarthmore		–		6	–	2	–	0
Washington & Jefferson		–		7	–	3	–	0
Colgate		–		4	–	2	–	0
Harvard		–		3	–	1	–	3
New Hampshire		–		3	–	2	–	2
Dartmouth		–		5	–	3	–	0
Geneva		–		5	–	3	–	1
Penn State		–		5	–	4	–	0
Buffalo		–		4	–	4	–	0
NYU		–		2	–	2	–	3
Tufts		–		3	–	3	–	0
Carnegie Tech		–		2	–	3	–	1
Bucknell		–		3	–	5	–	1
Lafayette		–		3	–	5	–	0
Holy Cross		–		3	–	4	–	0
Rhode Island State		–		2	–	4	–	2
Carlisle		–		3	–	6	–	0
Columbia		–		2	–	4	–	0
Delaware		–		2	–	5	–	0
Cornell		–		3	–	6	–	0
Franklin & Marshall		–		2	–	6	–	0
Villanova		–		0	–	3	–	2
Temple		–		0	–	6	–	1

The 1917 Yale Bulldogs football team, commonly known in 1917 as the Yale "Informals", represented Yale University in the 1917 college football season. The team compiled an undefeated 3–0 record and outscored opponents by a total of 47 to 0 in games against Loomis Institute (a private boarding school), New Haven Naval Base, and Trinity College. No Yale player received first-team honors on the 1917 College Football All-America Team.

== Schedule ==
Date	Opponent	Site	Result	Attendance	Source
October 27	Loomis Institute	Windsor, CT	W 7–0		
November 10	New Haven Naval Base	Yale Bowl; New Haven, CT	W 33–0		
November 17	Trinity (CT)	Yale Bowl; New Haven, CT	W 7–0	500	

== Roster ==
- A. D. Hendrickson, left end
- W. W. Meekins, left tackle
- G. Williams, left guard
- H. S. Walters, center
- A. M. Vorys, right guard
- K. Hamill, right tackle
- M. Borders, right end
- C. J. Stewart, fullback
- S. L. Reinhardt, right halfback
- C. G. Stradella, left halfback
- G. W. O'Connor, quarterback
- G. M. Sidenberg, substitute guard
- W. Bushby, substitute halfback
- J. P. Weyerhauser, substitute center

== Coaching staff ==
Tad Jones, who had been Yale's head coach in 1916, was called away from Yale for government service during the 1917 season. In his place, Arthur Brides served as the team's coach. Charles J. Stewart was the team captain, and Philip C. Walsh was the team manager. John Mack was the trainer and Brides' chief assistant coach.
