= 1917 NYU Violets football team =

American college football season

1917 NYU Violets football
- Conference: Independent
- Record: 2–2–3
- Head coach: Francis P. Wall (1st season)
- Home stadium: Ohio Field

1917 Eastern college football independents records
	Conf.			Overall
Team	W	L	T	W		L		T
Pittsburgh		–		10	–	0	–	0
Williams		–		7	–	0	–	1
Yale		–		3	–	0	–	0
Princeton		–		2	–	0	–	0
Syracuse		–		8	–	1	–	1
Army		–		7	–	1	–	0
Rutgers		–		7	–	1	–	1
Penn		–		9	–	2	–	0
Brown		–		8	–	2	–	0
Fordham		–		7	–	2	–	0
Lehigh		–		7	–	2	–	0
Boston College		–		6	–	2	–	0
Swarthmore		–		6	–	2	–	0
Washington & Jefferson		–		7	–	3	–	0
Colgate		–		4	–	2	–	0
Harvard		–		3	–	1	–	3
New Hampshire		–		3	–	2	–	2
Dartmouth		–		5	–	3	–	0
Geneva		–		5	–	3	–	1
Penn State		–		5	–	4	–	0
Buffalo		–		4	–	4	–	0
NYU		–		2	–	2	–	3
Tufts		–		3	–	3	–	0
Carnegie Tech		–		2	–	3	–	1
Bucknell		–		3	–	5	–	1
Lafayette		–		3	–	5	–	0
Holy Cross		–		3	–	4	–	0
Rhode Island State		–		2	–	4	–	2
Carlisle		–		3	–	6	–	0
Columbia		–		2	–	4	–	0
Delaware		–		2	–	5	–	0
Cornell		–		3	–	6	–	0
Franklin & Marshall		–		2	–	6	–	0
Villanova		–		0	–	3	–	2
Temple		–		0	–	6	–	1

The 1917 NYU Violets football team was an American football team that represented New York University as an independent during the 1917 college football season. In their only year under head coach Francis P. Wall, the team compiled a 2–2–3 record.

== Schedule ==
Date	Opponent	Site	Result	Source
October 6	at RPI	Troy, NY	L 3-6	
October 20	Wesleyan	Ohio Field; Bronx, NY	L 6–7	
October 27	Union (NY)	Ohio Field; Bronx, NY	T 0–0	
November 6	Trinity (CT)	Ohio Field; Bronx, NY	T 0–0	
November 10	Rhode Island State	Ohio Field; Bronx, NY	W 9–6	
November 17	at Stevens	Castle Point Field; Hoboken, NJ	T 6–6	
November 24	at Columbia	South Field; New York, NY	W 9–7	
