= Deed Harris =

Biographical details
- Born: June 5, 1876; Brookville, Pennsylvania, U.S.
- Died: May 28, 1961 (aged 84); Dauphin County, Pennsylvania, U.S.

Coaching career (HC unless noted)
- 1907–1914: Carlisle (assistant)
- 1917: Carlisle

Head coaching record
- Overall: 3–6

Leo Faller "Deed" Harris (June 6, 1876 – May 28, 1961) was an American sportsman who coached, scouted, and refereed football, baseball, and basketball. In 1917, he was the last coach of the Carlisle Indians football team. J.S. Steckbeck states that the team was forced to travel far off the Carlisle Barracks campus for practice because of a measles epidemic, lost practice time, and the result was that the team closed the season with 2 wins and 7 losses. In reality, the poor season was likely the inexperienced and young players. Pop Warner visited Carlisle in September 1917 to help prepare the squad and commented "not to expect great things from the team" and a "great football team cannot be developed in one season."

It is unknown how the nickname "Deed" originated but it was used by J.S. Steckbeck in his book Fabulous Redmen. Harris is incorrectly referred to as "D.D. Harris" in Anderson's book Carlisle vs. Army. Harris was called a local “football authority” due to his involvement in coaching, refereeing, and scouting.

Harris married into sports when he wed Irene Smith on June 5, 1909. Irene Smith was from a prominent Harrisburg, Pennsylvania family. Irene's brother was Harvey Smith, a noted surgeon in Harrisburg. Harvey Smith played infield on the Bucknell University baseball team for three seasons and for the Washington Senators during the 1896 season. Smith is credited with discovering future hall of fame pitcher Christy Mathewson, another Bucknell alumnus. Harris' other brother-in-law was Paul G. Smith, who coached football and baseball for Bucknell University in 1908. In 1909, Smith coached football at Dickinson College in Carlisle, Pennsylvania. While Smith worked as an attorney and judge, he coached football part-time at Central High School in Harrisburg and refereed. Harris was Smith's assistant coach at Central High School.

Pop Warner used Harris as an assistant coach and scout for the Carlisle Indian Industrial School's football program between 1907 and 1914, and according to Steckbeck, Harris accompanied the team on its trips. Harris and Warner maintained a close friendship until Warner's death in 1954. Harris also scouted for football programs at the University of Pittsburgh, Temple, Navy, and Penn State.

== Head coaching record ==
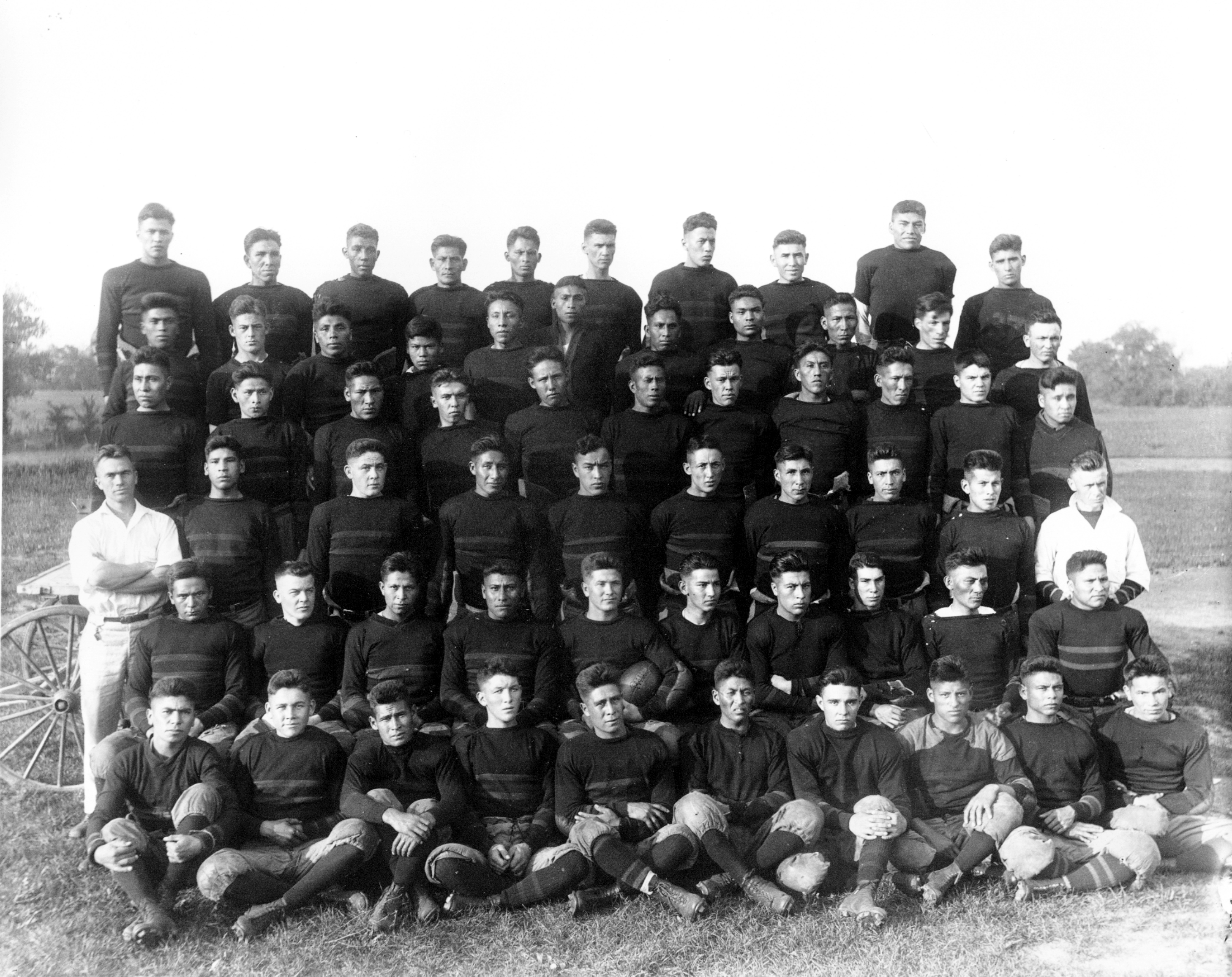
Carlisle Indian School 1917 Football Squad. Deed Harris is on the right. The person on the left is believed to be Frank Harris, his brother.

Year	Team	Overall	Conference	Standing	Bowl/playoffs
Carlisle Indians (Independent) (1917)
1917	Carlisle	3–6			
Carlisle:		3–6			
Total:		3–6			
