= 1917 Boston College football team =

American college football season

1917 Boston College football
- Conference: Independent
- Record: 6–2
- Head coach: Charles Brickley (2nd season)
- Captain: Charles Fitzgerald
- Home stadium: Alumni Field, Fenway Park

1917 Eastern college football independents records
	Conf.			Overall
Team	W	L	T	W		L		T
Pittsburgh		–		10	–	0	–	0
Williams		–		7	–	0	–	1
Yale		–		3	–	0	–	0
Princeton		–		2	–	0	–	0
Syracuse		–		8	–	1	–	1
Army		–		7	–	1	–	0
Rutgers		–		7	–	1	–	1
Penn		–		9	–	2	–	0
Brown		–		8	–	2	–	0
Fordham		–		7	–	2	–	0
Lehigh		–		7	–	2	–	0
Boston College		–		6	–	2	–	0
Swarthmore		–		6	–	2	–	0
Washington & Jefferson		–		7	–	3	–	0
Colgate		–		4	–	2	–	0
Harvard		–		3	–	1	–	3
New Hampshire		–		3	–	2	–	2
Dartmouth		–		5	–	3	–	0
Geneva		–		5	–	3	–	1
Penn State		–		5	–	4	–	0
Buffalo		–		4	–	4	–	0
NYU		–		2	–	2	–	3
Tufts		–		3	–	3	–	0
Carnegie Tech		–		2	–	3	–	1
Bucknell		–		3	–	5	–	1
Lafayette		–		3	–	5	–	0
Holy Cross		–		3	–	4	–	0
Rhode Island State		–		2	–	4	–	2
Carlisle		–		3	–	6	–	0
Columbia		–		2	–	4	–	0
Delaware		–		2	–	5	–	0
Cornell		–		3	–	6	–	0
Franklin & Marshall		–		2	–	6	–	0
Villanova		–		0	–	3	–	2
Temple		–		0	–	6	–	1

The 1917 Boston College football team was an American football team that represented Boston College as an independent during the 1917 college football season. Led by Charles Brickley in his second and final season as head coach, Boston College compiled a record of 6–2.

== Schedule ==
Date	Time	Opponent	Site	Result	Attendance	Source
September 29	2:15 p.m.	Norwich	Alumni Field; Chestnut Hill, MA	W 26–0	7,000	
October 6		Naval Reserves	Alumni Field; Chestnut Hill, MA	W 40–0	2,000	
October 12		Tufts	Fenway Park; Boston, MA	W 20–0	3,000	
October 20		at Brown	Andrews Field; Providence, RI	L 2–7		
November 3		Rhode Island State	Alumni Field; Chestnut Hill, MA	W 48–0		
November 10		Holy Cross	Fenway Park; Boston, MA (rivalry)	W 34–6	5,000	
November 17	2:15 p.m.	Middlebury	Alumni Field; Chestnut Hill, MA	W 31–6		
November 24		at Army	The Plain; West Point, NY	L 7–14		
