= 1917 Lehigh Brown and White football team =

American college football season

1917 Lehigh Brown and White football
- Conference: Independent
- Record: 7–2
- Head coach: Tom Keady (6th season)
- Home stadium: Taylor Stadium

1917 Eastern college football independents records
	Conf.			Overall
Team	W	L	T	W		L		T
Pittsburgh		–		10	–	0	–	0
Williams		–		7	–	0	–	1
Yale		–		3	–	0	–	0
Princeton		–		2	–	0	–	0
Syracuse		–		8	–	1	–	1
Army		–		7	–	1	–	0
Rutgers		–		7	–	1	–	1
Penn		–		9	–	2	–	0
Brown		–		8	–	2	–	0
Fordham		–		7	–	2	–	0
Lehigh		–		7	–	2	–	0
Boston College		–		6	–	2	–	0
Swarthmore		–		6	–	2	–	0
Washington & Jefferson		–		7	–	3	–	0
Colgate		–		4	–	2	–	0
Harvard		–		3	–	1	–	3
New Hampshire		–		3	–	2	–	2
Dartmouth		–		5	–	3	–	0
Geneva		–		5	–	3	–	1
Penn State		–		5	–	4	–	0
Buffalo		–		4	–	4	–	0
NYU		–		2	–	2	–	3
Tufts		–		3	–	3	–	0
Carnegie Tech		–		2	–	3	–	1
Bucknell		–		3	–	5	–	1
Lafayette		–		3	–	5	–	0
Holy Cross		–		3	–	4	–	0
Rhode Island State		–		2	–	4	–	2
Carlisle		–		3	–	6	–	0
Columbia		–		2	–	4	–	0
Delaware		–		2	–	5	–	0
Cornell		–		3	–	6	–	0
Franklin & Marshall		–		2	–	6	–	0
Villanova		–		0	–	3	–	2
Temple		–		0	–	6	–	1

The 1917 Lehigh Brown and White football team was an American football team that represented Lehigh University as an independent during the 1917 college football season. In its sixth season under head coach Tom Keady, the team compiled a 7–2 record and outscored opponents by a total of 228 to 78. Lehigh played home games at Taylor Stadium in South Bethlehem, Pennsylvania.

== Schedule ==
Date	Opponent	Site	Result	Attendance	Source
September 29	7th Infantry (Gettysburg Camp)	Taylor Stadium; South Bethlehem, PA	W 7–0		
October 6	Ursinus	Taylor Stadium; South Bethlehem, PA	W 13–7		
October 13	at Pittsburgh	Forbes Field; Pittsburgh, PA	L 0–41	5,000	
October 20	Georgetown	Taylor Stadium; South Bethlehem, PA	L 6–17		
October 27	Lebanon Valley	Taylor Stadium; South Bethlehem, PA	W 34–7		
November 3	Muhlenberg	Taylor Stadium; South Bethlehem, PA	W 47–0		
November 10	at Penn State	New Beaver Field; State College, PA	W 9–0		
November 17	Pennsylvania Military	Taylor Stadium; South Bethlehem, PA	W 34–6		
November 24	Lafayette	Taylor Stadium; South Bethlehem, PA (rivalry)	W 78–0		
