= 1917 Army Cadets football team =

American college football season

1917 Army Cadets football
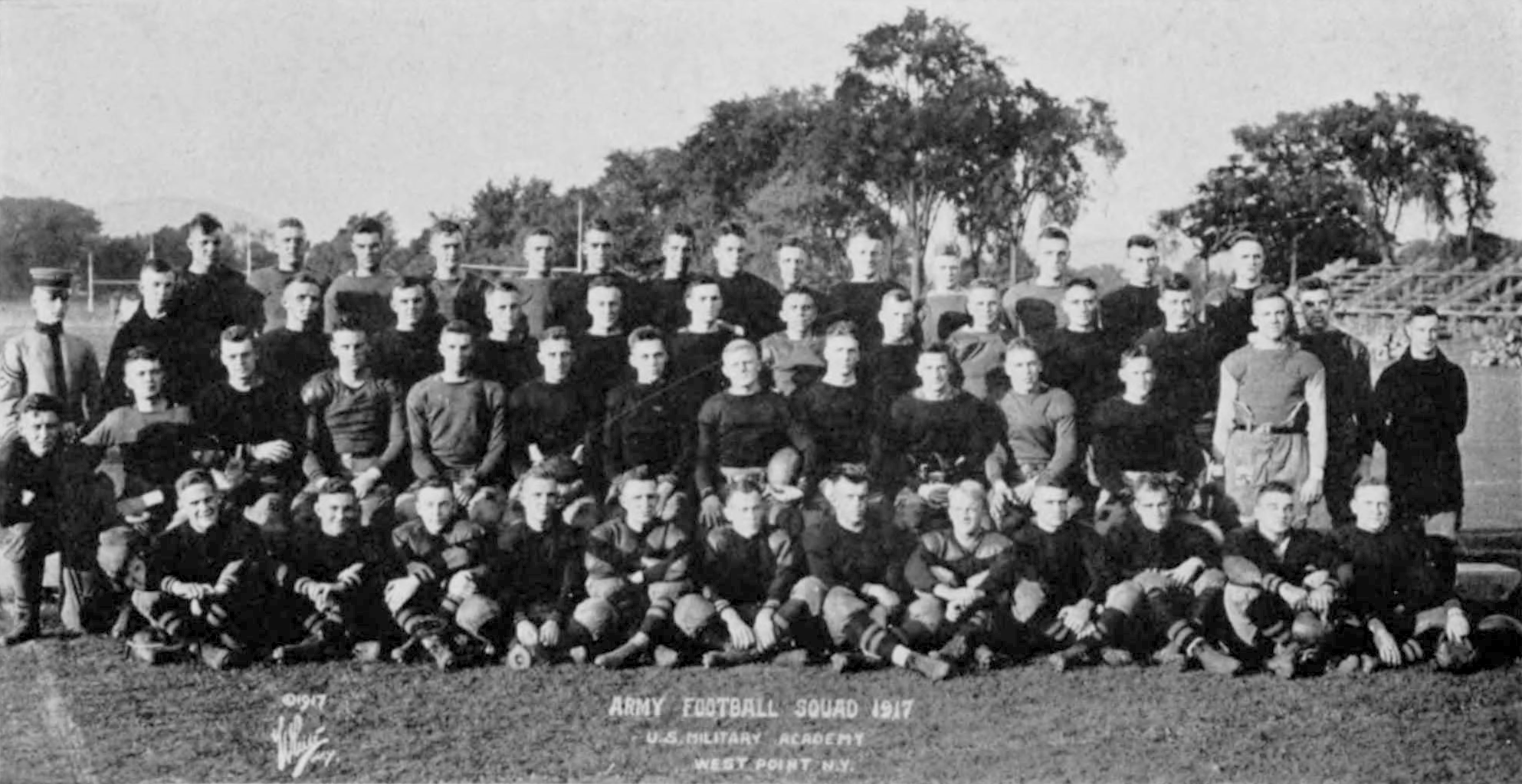
- Conference: Independent
- Record: 7–1
- Head coach: Geoffrey Keyes (1st season)
- Captains: Biff Jones; Elmer Oliphant
- Home stadium: The Plain

1917 Eastern college football independents records
	Conf.			Overall
Team	W	L	T	W		L		T
Pittsburgh		–		10	–	0	–	0
Williams		–		7	–	0	–	1
Yale		–		3	–	0	–	0
Princeton		–		2	–	0	–	0
Syracuse		–		8	–	1	–	1
Army		–		7	–	1	–	0
Rutgers		–		7	–	1	–	1
Penn		–		9	–	2	–	0
Brown		–		8	–	2	–	0
Fordham		–		7	–	2	–	0
Lehigh		–		7	–	2	–	0
Boston College		–		6	–	2	–	0
Swarthmore		–		6	–	2	–	0
Washington & Jefferson		–		7	–	3	–	0
Colgate		–		4	–	2	–	0
Harvard		–		3	–	1	–	3
New Hampshire		–		3	–	2	–	2
Dartmouth		–		5	–	3	–	0
Geneva		–		5	–	3	–	1
Penn State		–		5	–	4	–	0
Buffalo		–		4	–	4	–	0
NYU		–		2	–	2	–	3
Tufts		–		3	–	3	–	0
Carnegie Tech		–		2	–	3	–	1
Bucknell		–		3	–	5	–	1
Lafayette		–		3	–	5	–	0
Holy Cross		–		3	–	4	–	0
Rhode Island State		–		2	–	4	–	2
Carlisle		–		3	–	6	–	0
Columbia		–		2	–	4	–	0
Delaware		–		2	–	5	–	0
Cornell		–		3	–	6	–	0
Franklin & Marshall		–		2	–	6	–	0
Villanova		–		0	–	3	–	2
Temple		–		0	–	6	–	1

The 1917 Army Cadets football team represented the United States Military Academy as an independent during the 1917 college football season. In their first and only season under head coach Geoffrey Keyes, the Cadets compiled a 7–1 record, shut out four of their eight opponents, and outscored all opponents by a combined total of 203 to 24. All eight games were played at home and the Cadets' sole loss came to Notre Dame by a 7–2 score. The Army–Navy Game was not played this season or the next.

Halfback Elmer Oliphant was a consensus first-team player on the All-America team and was later inducted into the College Football Hall of Fame.

== Schedule ==
Date	Opponent	Site	Result	Source
October 6	Carnegie Tech	The Plain; West Point, NY	W 28–0	
October 13	VMI	The Plain; West Point, NY	W 34–0	
October 20	Tufts	The Plain; West Point, NY	W 26–3	
October 27	Villanova	The Plain; West Point, NY	W 21–7	
November 3	Notre Dame	The Plain; West Point, NY (rivalry)	L 2–7	
November 10	Carlisle	The Plain; West Point, NY	W 28–0	
November 17	Lebanon Valley	The Plain; West Point, NY	W 50–0	
November 24	Boston College	The Plain; West Point, NY	W 14–7	
