= 1917 Dartmouth football team =

American college football season

1917 Dartmouth football
- Conference: Independent
- Record: 5–3
- Head coach: Clarence Spears (1st season)
- Captain: Hubert McDonough

1917 Eastern college football independents records
	Conf.			Overall
Team	W	L	T	W		L		T
Pittsburgh		–		10	–	0	–	0
Williams		–		7	–	0	–	1
Yale		–		3	–	0	–	0
Princeton		–		2	–	0	–	0
Syracuse		–		8	–	1	–	1
Army		–		7	–	1	–	0
Rutgers		–		7	–	1	–	1
Penn		–		9	–	2	–	0
Brown		–		8	–	2	–	0
Fordham		–		7	–	2	–	0
Lehigh		–		7	–	2	–	0
Boston College		–		6	–	2	–	0
Swarthmore		–		6	–	2	–	0
Washington & Jefferson		–		7	–	3	–	0
Colgate		–		4	–	2	–	0
Harvard		–		3	–	1	–	3
New Hampshire		–		3	–	2	–	2
Dartmouth		–		5	–	3	–	0
Geneva		–		5	–	3	–	1
Penn State		–		5	–	4	–	0
Buffalo		–		4	–	4	–	0
NYU		–		2	–	2	–	3
Tufts		–		3	–	3	–	0
Carnegie Tech		–		2	–	3	–	1
Bucknell		–		3	–	5	–	1
Lafayette		–		3	–	5	–	0
Holy Cross		–		3	–	4	–	0
Rhode Island State		–		2	–	4	–	2
Carlisle		–		3	–	6	–	0
Columbia		–		2	–	4	–	0
Delaware		–		2	–	5	–	0
Cornell		–		3	–	6	–	0
Franklin & Marshall		–		2	–	6	–	0
Villanova		–		0	–	3	–	2
Temple		–		0	–	6	–	1

The 1917 Dartmouth football team was an American football team that represented Dartmouth College as an independent during the 1917 college football season. In its first season under head coach Clarence Spears, the team compiled a 5–3 record and outscored opponents by a total of 83 to 68. Hubert McDonough was the team captain.

== Schedule ==
Date	Opponent	Site	Result	Source
October 6	Springfield YMCA	Hanover, NH	W 14–0	
October 13	Middlebury	Hanover, NH	W 32–6	
October 20	West Virginia	Hanover, NH	W 6–2	
October 27	New Hampshire	Hanover, NH (rivalry)	W 21–6	
November 3	Penn State	Hanover, NH	W 10–7	
November 10	vs. Penn	Braves Field; Boston, MA	L 0–7	
November 17	vs. Tufts	Textile Field; Manchester, NH	L 0–27	
November 24	vs. Brown	Braves Field; Boston, MA	L 0–13	
