= 1917 Villanova Wildcats football team =

American college football season

1917 Villanova Wildcats football
- Conference: Independent
- Record: 0–3–2
- Head coach: Thomas Reap (1st season)
- Captain: Charles McGuckin
- Home stadium: None

1917 Eastern college football independents records
	Conf.			Overall
Team	W	L	T	W		L		T
Pittsburgh		–		10	–	0	–	0
Williams		–		7	–	0	–	1
Yale		–		3	–	0	–	0
Princeton		–		2	–	0	–	0
Syracuse		–		8	–	1	–	1
Army		–		7	–	1	–	0
Rutgers		–		7	–	1	–	1
Penn		–		9	–	2	–	0
Brown		–		8	–	2	–	0
Fordham		–		7	–	2	–	0
Lehigh		–		7	–	2	–	0
Boston College		–		6	–	2	–	0
Swarthmore		–		6	–	2	–	0
Washington & Jefferson		–		7	–	3	–	0
Colgate		–		4	–	2	–	0
Harvard		–		3	–	1	–	3
New Hampshire		–		3	–	2	–	2
Dartmouth		–		5	–	3	–	0
Geneva		–		5	–	3	–	1
Penn State		–		5	–	4	–	0
Buffalo		–		4	–	4	–	0
NYU		–		2	–	2	–	3
Tufts		–		3	–	3	–	0
Carnegie Tech		–		2	–	3	–	1
Bucknell		–		3	–	5	–	1
Lafayette		–		3	–	5	–	0
Holy Cross		–		3	–	4	–	0
Rhode Island State		–		2	–	4	–	2
Carlisle		–		3	–	6	–	0
Columbia		–		2	–	4	–	0
Delaware		–		2	–	5	–	0
Cornell		–		3	–	6	–	0
Franklin & Marshall		–		2	–	6	–	0
Villanova		–		0	–	3	–	2
Temple		–		0	–	6	–	1

The 1917 Villanova Wildcats football team represented the Villanova University during the 1917 college football season. The Wildcats team captain was Charles McGuckin.

== Schedule ==
Date	Opponent	Site	Result
October 2	at Muhlenberg	Allentown, PA	T 0–0
October 20	Lebanon Valley	Villanova, PA	L 0–16
October 27	at Army	The Plain; West Point, NY	L 7–21
November 3	vs. Ursinus	Norristown, PA	T 7–7
November 17	at Navy	Worden Field; Annapolis, MD	L 3–80
