= 1917 Princeton Tigers football team =

American college football season

1917 Princeton Tigers football
- Conference: Independent
- Record: 2–0
- Head coach: Keene Fitzpatrick (1st season)
- Captain: Jack Winn
- Home stadium: Palmer Stadium

1917 Eastern college football independents records
| | Conf. | | | Overall |
| Team | W | L | T | W | | L | | T |
|---|---|---|---|---|---|---|---|---|
| Pittsburgh | | – | | 10 | – | 0 | – | 0 |
| Williams | | – | | 7 | – | 0 | – | 1 |
| Yale | | – | | 3 | – | 0 | – | 0 |
| Princeton | | – | | 2 | – | 0 | – | 0 |
| Syracuse | | – | | 8 | – | 1 | – | 1 |
| Army | | – | | 7 | – | 1 | – | 0 |
| Rutgers | | – | | 7 | – | 1 | – | 1 |
| Penn | | – | | 9 | – | 2 | – | 0 |
| Brown | | – | | 8 | – | 2 | – | 0 |
| Fordham | | – | | 7 | – | 2 | – | 0 |
| Lehigh | | – | | 7 | – | 2 | – | 0 |
| Boston College | | – | | 6 | – | 2 | – | 0 |
| Swarthmore | | – | | 6 | – | 2 | – | 0 |
| Washington & Jefferson | | – | | 7 | – | 3 | – | 0 |
| Colgate | | – | | 4 | – | 2 | – | 0 |
| Harvard | | – | | 3 | – | 1 | – | 3 |
| New Hampshire | | – | | 3 | – | 2 | – | 2 |
| Dartmouth | | – | | 5 | – | 3 | – | 0 |
| Geneva | | – | | 5 | – | 3 | – | 1 |
| Penn State | | – | | 5 | – | 4 | – | 0 |
| Buffalo | | – | | 4 | – | 4 | – | 0 |
| NYU | | – | | 2 | – | 2 | – | 3 |
| Tufts | | – | | 3 | – | 3 | – | 0 |
| Carnegie Tech | | – | | 2 | – | 3 | – | 1 |
| Bucknell | | – | | 3 | – | 5 | – | 1 |
| Lafayette | | – | | 3 | – | 5 | – | 0 |
| Holy Cross | | – | | 3 | – | 4 | – | 0 |
| Rhode Island State | | – | | 2 | – | 4 | – | 2 |
| Carlisle | | – | | 3 | – | 6 | – | 0 |
| Columbia | | – | | 2 | – | 4 | – | 0 |
| Delaware | | – | | 2 | – | 5 | – | 0 |
| Cornell | | – | | 3 | – | 6 | – | 0 |
| Franklin & Marshall | | – | | 2 | – | 6 | – | 0 |
| Villanova | | – | | 0 | – | 3 | – | 2 |
| Temple | | – | | 0 | – | 6 | – | 1 |

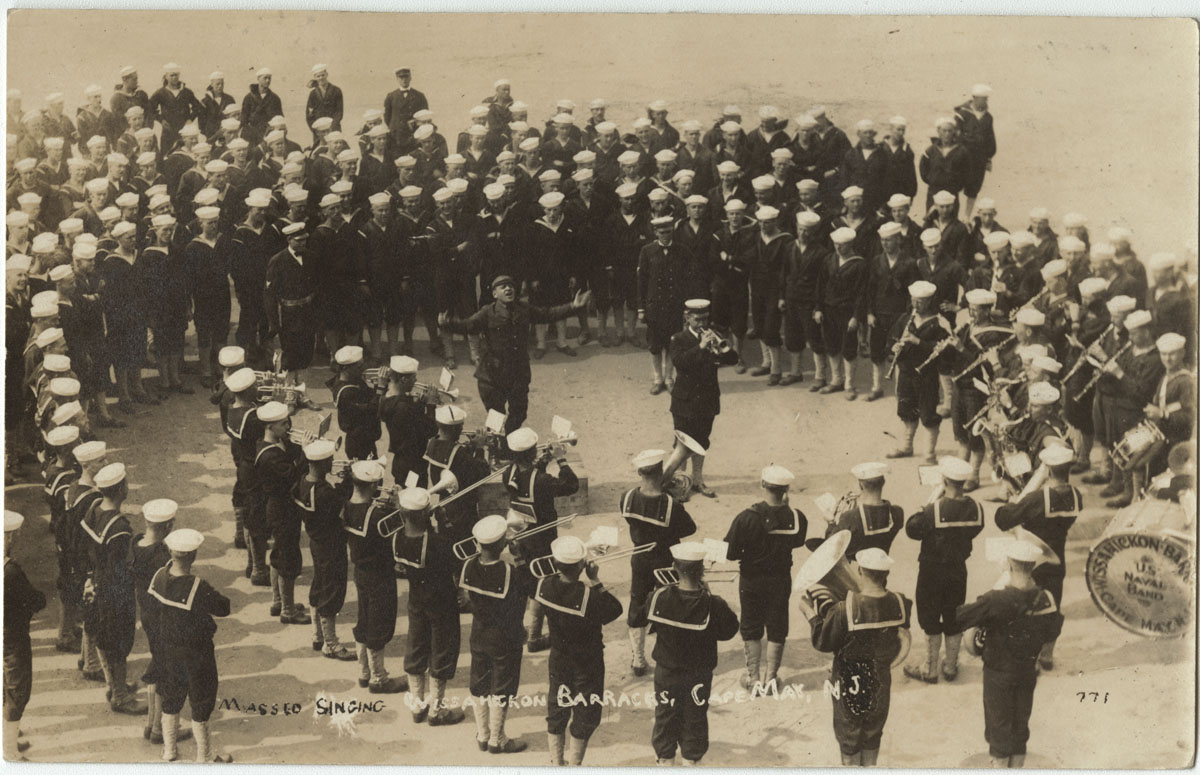
Wissahickon Barracks

The 1917 Princeton Tigers football team represented Princeton University in the 1917 college football season. The team finished with a 2–0 record under first-year head coach Keene Fitzpatrick, outscoring opponents by a total of 50 to 0 in games against Fort Dix and Wissahickon Barracks. No Princeton players were selected as first-team honorees on the 1917 College Football All-America Team.

== Schedule ==
| Date | Opponent | Site | Result | Source |
|---|---|---|---|---|
| October 27 | 307th Field Artillery of Camp Dix | Palmer Stadium; Princeton, NJ | W 7–0 | |
| November 17 | Naval Reserve, Wissahickon Barracks at Cape May, NJ | Princeton, NJ | W 41–0 | |
