= 1917 Harvard Crimson football team =

American college football season

1917 Harvard Crimson football
- Conference: Independent
- Record: 3–1–3
- Head coach: Wingate Rollins (1st season)
- Home stadium: Harvard Stadium

1917 Eastern college football independents records
	Conf.			Overall
Team	W	L	T	W		L		T
Pittsburgh		–		10	–	0	–	0
Williams		–		7	–	0	–	1
Yale		–		3	–	0	–	0
Princeton		–		2	–	0	–	0
Syracuse		–		8	–	1	–	1
Army		–		7	–	1	–	0
Rutgers		–		7	–	1	–	1
Penn		–		9	–	2	–	0
Brown		–		8	–	2	–	0
Fordham		–		7	–	2	–	0
Lehigh		–		7	–	2	–	0
Boston College		–		6	–	2	–	0
Swarthmore		–		6	–	2	–	0
Washington & Jefferson		–		7	–	3	–	0
Colgate		–		4	–	2	–	0
Harvard		–		3	–	1	–	3
New Hampshire		–		3	–	2	–	2
Dartmouth		–		5	–	3	–	0
Geneva		–		5	–	3	–	1
Penn State		–		5	–	4	–	0
Buffalo		–		4	–	4	–	0
NYU		–		2	–	2	–	3
Tufts		–		3	–	3	–	0
Carnegie Tech		–		2	–	3	–	1
Bucknell		–		3	–	5	–	1
Lafayette		–		3	–	5	–	0
Holy Cross		–		3	–	4	–	0
Rhode Island State		–		2	–	4	–	2
Carlisle		–		3	–	6	–	0
Columbia		–		2	–	4	–	0
Delaware		–		2	–	5	–	0
Cornell		–		3	–	6	–	0
Franklin & Marshall		–		2	–	6	–	0
Villanova		–		0	–	3	–	2
Temple		–		0	–	6	–	1

The 1917 Harvard Crimson football team, also known as the Harvard Informals, represented Harvard University in the 1917 college football season. The Crimson finished with a 3–1–3 record under first-year head coach Wingate Rollins. Walter Camp did not select any Harvard players as first-team members of his 1917 College Football All-America Team.

The team was known as the "Informals" for legal reasons. Prior to the United States' entry into World War I, the team had signed binding contracts to play games with various universities and colleges. When war was declared, the team cancelled its season and cancelled the contracts. When students decide to play football after all, the team was denoted as an "informal" team to fulfill the desire for football without opening the team up to suits for breach of contract.

== Schedule ==
Date	Opponent	Site	Result	Attendance	Source
October 6	at Dean Academy	Franklin, MA	W 27–0		
October 13	Bumpkin Island Naval Reserve	Harvard Stadium; Boston, MA	W 35–0	4,000	
October 20	1st Maine Heavy Artillery	Harvard Stadium; Boston, MA	W 13–0		
October 27	at Depot Brigade	Camp Devens; Ayer, MA	T 0–0		
November 3	Portland Naval Reserve	Soldiers' Field; Cambridge, MA	T 0–0	20,000	
November 10	Camp Devens	Harvard Stadium; Boston, MA	T 0–0	400	
November 17	at Newport Naval Reserves	Newport, RI	L 0–14		
