= 1917 Penn Quakers football team =

American college football season

1917 Penn Quakers football
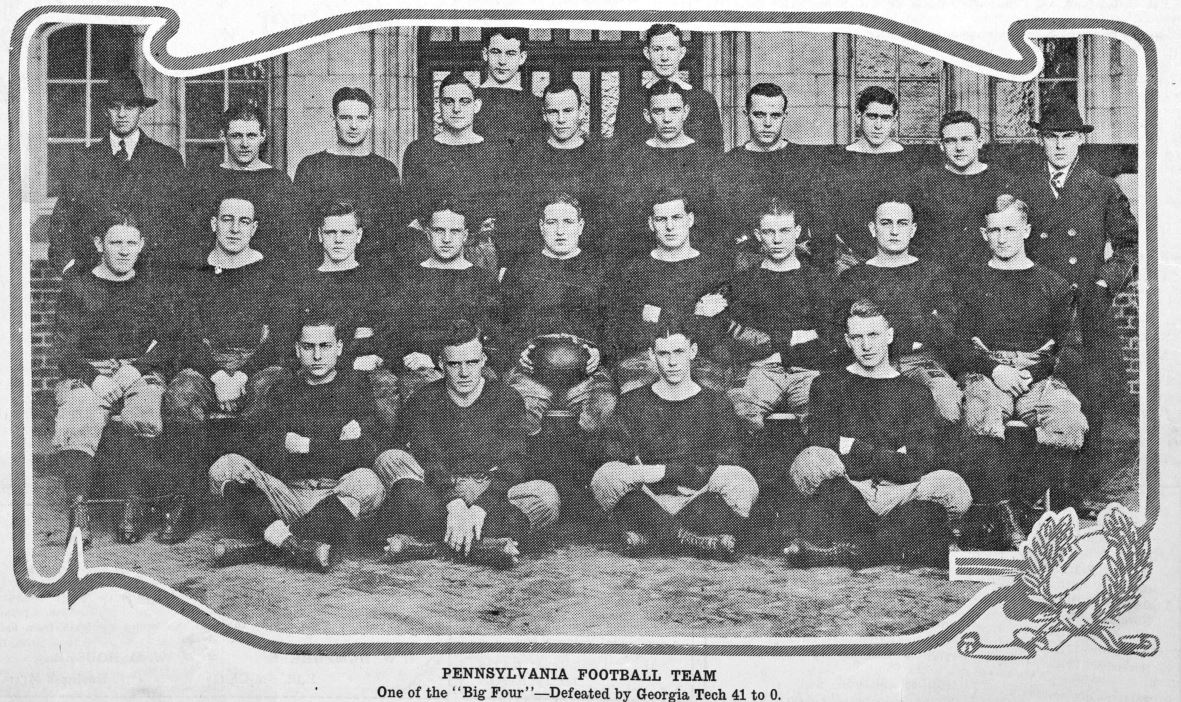
- Conference: Independent
- Record: 9–2
- Head coach: Bob Folwell (2nd season)
- Captain: Heinie Miller
- Home stadium: Franklin Field

1917 Eastern college football independents records
	Conf.			Overall
Team	W	L	T	W		L		T
Pittsburgh		–		10	–	0	–	0
Williams		–		7	–	0	–	1
Yale		–		3	–	0	–	0
Princeton		–		2	–	0	–	0
Syracuse		–		8	–	1	–	1
Army		–		7	–	1	–	0
Rutgers		–		7	–	1	–	1
Penn		–		9	–	2	–	0
Brown		–		8	–	2	–	0
Fordham		–		7	–	2	–	0
Lehigh		–		7	–	2	–	0
Boston College		–		6	–	2	–	0
Swarthmore		–		6	–	2	–	0
Washington & Jefferson		–		7	–	3	–	0
Colgate		–		4	–	2	–	0
Harvard		–		3	–	1	–	3
New Hampshire		–		3	–	2	–	2
Dartmouth		–		5	–	3	–	0
Geneva		–		5	–	3	–	1
Penn State		–		5	–	4	–	0
Buffalo		–		4	–	4	–	0
NYU		–		2	–	2	–	3
Tufts		–		3	–	3	–	0
Carnegie Tech		–		2	–	3	–	1
Bucknell		–		3	–	5	–	1
Lafayette		–		3	–	5	–	0
Holy Cross		–		3	–	4	–	0
Rhode Island State		–		2	–	4	–	2
Carlisle		–		3	–	6	–	0
Columbia		–		2	–	4	–	0
Delaware		–		2	–	5	–	0
Cornell		–		3	–	6	–	0
Franklin & Marshall		–		2	–	6	–	0
Villanova		–		0	–	3	–	2
Temple		–		0	–	6	–	1

The 1917 Penn Quakers football team represented the University of Pennsylvania as an independent during the 1917 college football season. The Quakers finished with a 9–2 record in their second year under head coach Bob Folwell. Significant games included victories over Michigan (16–0), Carlisle (26–0), and Cornell (37–0), and losses to undefeated national champion Georgia Tech (41–0) and Pittsburgh (14–6). The 1917 Penn team outscored its opponents by a combined total of 245 to 71.

Five Penn players received honors on the 1917 College Football All-America Team. They are: end Heinie Miller (Jack Veiock and Dick Jemison 1st teams, Walter Eckersall, 2nd team); Joseph Strauss (Jemison 1st team); guard Herbert Dieter (Paul Purman 2nd team); center Lud Wray (New York Times All-Service team, Purman 2nd team); and fullback Joseph Howard Berry, Jr. (Eckersall and Purman 1st teams, Veiock 2nd team).

== Schedule ==
Date	Opponent	Site	Result	Attendance	Source
October 3	Albright	Franklin Field; Philadelphia, PA	W 73–10		
October 6	at Georgia Tech	Franklin Field; Philadelphia, PA	L 0–41		
October 13	Swarthmore	Franklin Field; Philadelphia, PA	W 10–0		
October 20	Bucknell	Franklin Field; Philadelphia, PA	W 20–6	5,000	
October 27	Pittsburgh	Franklin Field; Philadelphia, PA	L 6–14	18,000	
November 3	Lafayette	Franklin Field; Philadelphia, PA	W 27–0		
November 6	Pennsylvania Military	Franklin Field; Philadelphia, PA	W 23–0		
November 10	vs. Dartmouth	Braves Field; Boston, MA	W 7–0		
November 17	Michigan	Franklin Field; Philadelphia, PA	W 16–0	12,851	
November 24	Carlisle	Franklin Field; Philadelphia, PA	W 26–0		
November 29	Cornell	Franklin Field; Philadelphia, PA (rivalry)	W 37–0		
