= 1917 Swarthmore Quakers football team =

American college football season

1917 Swarthmore Quakers football
- Conference: Independent
- Record: 6–2
- Head coach: Leroy Mercer (1st season)
- Home stadium: Swarthmore Field

1917 Eastern college football independents records
	Conf.			Overall
Team	W	L	T	W		L		T
Pittsburgh		–		10	–	0	–	0
Williams		–		7	–	0	–	1
Yale		–		3	–	0	–	0
Princeton		–		2	–	0	–	0
Syracuse		–		8	–	1	–	1
Army		–		7	–	1	–	0
Rutgers		–		7	–	1	–	1
Penn		–		9	–	2	–	0
Brown		–		8	–	2	–	0
Fordham		–		7	–	2	–	0
Lehigh		–		7	–	2	–	0
Boston College		–		6	–	2	–	0
Swarthmore		–		6	–	2	–	0
Washington & Jefferson		–		7	–	3	–	0
Colgate		–		4	–	2	–	0
Harvard		–		3	–	1	–	3
New Hampshire		–		3	–	2	–	2
Dartmouth		–		5	–	3	–	0
Geneva		–		5	–	3	–	1
Penn State		–		5	–	4	–	0
Buffalo		–		4	–	4	–	0
NYU		–		2	–	2	–	3
Tufts		–		3	–	3	–	0
Carnegie Tech		–		2	–	3	–	1
Bucknell		–		3	–	5	–	1
Lafayette		–		3	–	5	–	0
Holy Cross		–		3	–	4	–	0
Rhode Island State		–		2	–	4	–	2
Carlisle		–		3	–	6	–	0
Columbia		–		2	–	4	–	0
Delaware		–		2	–	5	–	0
Cornell		–		3	–	6	–	0
Franklin & Marshall		–		2	–	6	–	0
Villanova		–		0	–	3	–	2
Temple		–		0	–	6	–	1

The 1917 Swarthmore Quakers football team was an American football team that represented Swarthmore College as an independent during the 1917 college football season. The team compiled a 6–2 record and outscored opponents by a total of 238 to 40. Bill Roper was the head coach.

== Schedule ==
Date	Opponent	Site	Result	Source
October 6	at Bucknell	Lewisburg, PA	L 7–16	
October 13	at Penn	Franklin Field; Philadelphia, PA	L 0–10	
October 20	Gettysburg	Swarthmore Field; Swarthmore, PA	W 17–0	
October 27	Franklin & Marshall	Swarthmore Field; Swarthmore, PA	W 46–0	
November 3	at Johns Hopkins	Homewood Field; Baltimore, MD	W 28–7	
November 10	Lafayette	Swarthmore Field; Swarthmore, PA	W 56–0	
November 17	at Delaware	Newark, DE	W 27–0	
November 24	Haverford	Swarthmore Field; Swarthmore, PA (rivalry)	W 57–7	
