= 1917 Syracuse Orangemen football team =

American college football season

1917 Syracuse Orangemen football
- Conference: Independent
- Record: 8–1–1
- Head coach: Frank "Buck" O'Neill (6th season)
- Captain: Alf Cobb
- Home stadium: Archbold Stadium

1917 Eastern college football independents records
	Conf.			Overall
Team	W	L	T	W		L		T
Pittsburgh		–		10	–	0	–	0
Williams		–		7	–	0	–	1
Yale		–		3	–	0	–	0
Princeton		–		2	–	0	–	0
Syracuse		–		8	–	1	–	1
Army		–		7	–	1	–	0
Rutgers		–		7	–	1	–	1
Penn		–		9	–	2	–	0
Brown		–		8	–	2	–	0
Fordham		–		7	–	2	–	0
Lehigh		–		7	–	2	–	0
Boston College		–		6	–	2	–	0
Swarthmore		–		6	–	2	–	0
Washington & Jefferson		–		7	–	3	–	0
Colgate		–		4	–	2	–	0
Harvard		–		3	–	1	–	3
New Hampshire		–		3	–	2	–	2
Dartmouth		–		5	–	3	–	0
Geneva		–		5	–	3	–	1
Penn State		–		5	–	4	–	0
Buffalo		–		4	–	4	–	0
NYU		–		2	–	2	–	3
Tufts		–		3	–	3	–	0
Carnegie Tech		–		2	–	3	–	1
Bucknell		–		3	–	5	–	1
Lafayette		–		3	–	5	–	0
Holy Cross		–		3	–	4	–	0
Rhode Island State		–		2	–	4	–	2
Carlisle		–		3	–	6	–	0
Columbia		–		2	–	4	–	0
Delaware		–		2	–	5	–	0
Cornell		–		3	–	6	–	0
Franklin & Marshall		–		2	–	6	–	0
Villanova		–		0	–	3	–	2
Temple		–		0	–	6	–	1

The 1917 Syracuse Orangemen football team represented Syracuse University as an independent during the 1917 college football season.

== Schedule ==
Date	Opponent	Site	Result	Attendance	Source
September 29	47th Infantry Regiment	Archbold Stadium; Syracuse, NY	T 0–0	4,000	
October 6	47th Infantry Regiment	Archbold Stadium; Syracuse, NY	W 19–0		
October 13	Rutgers	Archbold Stadium; Syracuse, NY	W 14–10		
October 20	at Pittsburgh	Forbes Field; Pittsburgh, PA (rivalry)	L 0–28	10,000	
October 27	Tufts	Archbold Stadium; Syracuse, NY	W 58–0		
November 3	at Brown	Andrews Field; Providence, RI	W 6–0	5,000	
November 10	Bucknell	Archbold Stadium; Syracuse, NY	W 42–0		
November 17	Colgate	Archbold Stadium; Syracuse, NY (rivalry)	W 27–7	16,000	
November 24	at Michigan Agricultural	College Field; East Lansing, MI	W 21–7		
November 29	at Nebraska	Nebraska Field; Lincoln, NE	W 10–9	10,000	
