= 1917 Rutgers Queensmen football team =

American college football season

1917 Rutgers Queensmen football
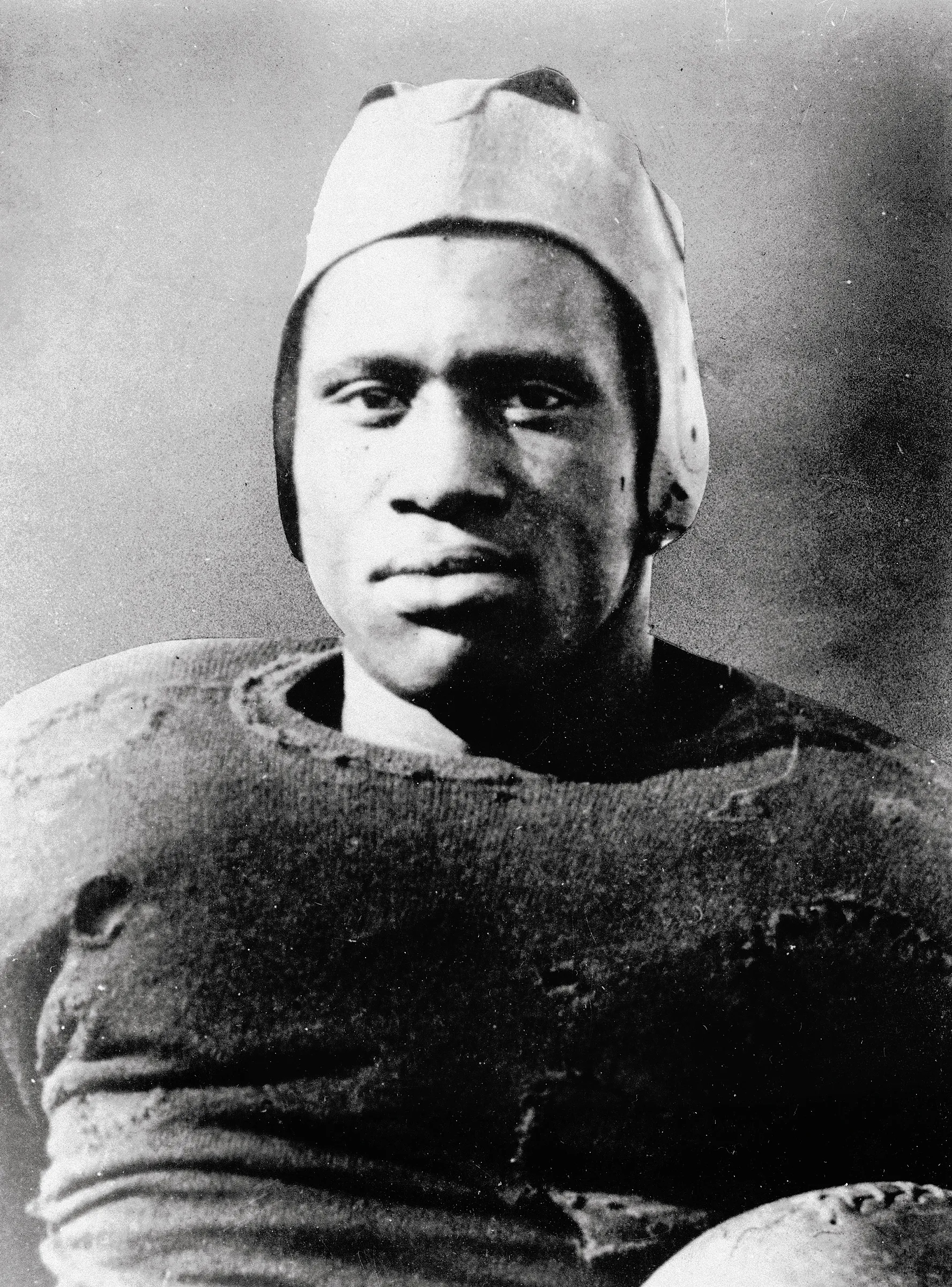
- Rutgers end Paul Robeson
- Conference: Independent
- Record: 7–1–1
- Head coach: George Sanford (5th season)
- Home stadium: Neilson Field

1917 Eastern college football independents records
	Conf.			Overall
Team	W	L	T	W		L		T
Pittsburgh		–		10	–	0	–	0
Williams		–		7	–	0	–	1
Yale		–		3	–	0	–	0
Princeton		–		2	–	0	–	0
Syracuse		–		8	–	1	–	1
Army		–		7	–	1	–	0
Rutgers		–		7	–	1	–	1
Penn		–		9	–	2	–	0
Brown		–		8	–	2	–	0
Fordham		–		7	–	2	–	0
Lehigh		–		7	–	2	–	0
Boston College		–		6	–	2	–	0
Swarthmore		–		6	–	2	–	0
Washington & Jefferson		–		7	–	3	–	0
Colgate		–		4	–	2	–	0
Harvard		–		3	–	1	–	3
New Hampshire		–		3	–	2	–	2
Dartmouth		–		5	–	3	–	0
Geneva		–		5	–	3	–	1
Penn State		–		5	–	4	–	0
Buffalo		–		4	–	4	–	0
NYU		–		2	–	2	–	3
Tufts		–		3	–	3	–	0
Carnegie Tech		–		2	–	3	–	1
Bucknell		–		3	–	5	–	1
Lafayette		–		3	–	5	–	0
Holy Cross		–		3	–	4	–	0
Rhode Island State		–		2	–	4	–	2
Carlisle		–		3	–	6	–	0
Columbia		–		2	–	4	–	0
Delaware		–		2	–	5	–	0
Cornell		–		3	–	6	–	0
Franklin & Marshall		–		2	–	6	–	0
Villanova		–		0	–	3	–	2
Temple		–		0	–	6	–	1

The 1917 Rutgers Queensmen football team was an American football team that represented Rutgers University as an independent during the 1917 college football season. In their fifth season under head coach George Sanford, the Queensmen compiled a 7–1–1 record and outscored their opponents, 295 to 28. The team's wins included a 28–0 victory over Fordham. The sole loss was to Syracuse by a 14–10 score. The tie was a 7–7 game with West Virginia.

Key players included end Paul Robeson, tackle William Feitner, team captain Ken "Thug" Rendall who left the team at the end of the season to join the Naval Aviation Corps, Frank Kelly, Joe Breckley, and Mike Whitehill.

== Schedule ==
Date	Opponent	Site	Result	Source
September 29	Ursinus	Neilson Field; New Brunswick, NJ	W 25–0	
October 6	Camp Wadsworth	Neilson Field; New Brunswick, NJ	W 90–0	
October 13	at Syracuse	Archbold Stadium; Syracuse, NY	L 10–14	
October 20	at Lafayette	March Field; Easton, PA	W 33–7	
October 27	at Fordham	Fordham Field; Bronx, NY	W 28–0	
November 3	West Virginia	Neilson Field; New Brunswick, NJ	T 7–7	
November 10	Springfield YMCA	Neilson Field; New Brunswick, NJ	W 61–0	
November 17	League Island Navy	Neilson Field; New Brunswick, NJ	W 27–0	
November 24	vs. Newport Naval Reserves	Ebbets Field; Brooklyn, NY	W 14–0	

== Role of Paul Robeson ==
Paul Robeson played at the end position on both offense and defense. In his history of Rutgers football, Michael Pellowski wrote:

It was in the last game of the 1917 season that Paul Robeson dazzled sportswriters and American football fans coast to coast. . . . Rutgers' Paul Robeson ruled the gridiron that day. He singlehandedly terrorized the opposing offense, making crushing tackle after tackle. On offense he caught a pass at the 5-yard line and dragged three would-be tacklers into the end zone to score a touchdown.

In January 1918, Robeson wrote a review of Rutgers' football season in the Rutgers Alumni Quarterly:

The season of 1917 is over, but the memories thereof will fire the hearts of Rutgers men as long as football is football. For the team, fighting as only a Rutgers team can fight, and inspired by the indomitable spirit of that greatest of football mentors, George Foster Sanford, rose to the greatest heights, and stands not only as one of the best teams of the year but as one of the greatest of all time. Coach Sanford says that it is the nearest to the Yale '91 team he has ever seen, and this perhaps is the greatest compliment received . . .

At the end of the 1917 season, Robeson was selected by Frank G. Menke as a first-team All-American. Robeson was later inducted into the College Football Hall of Fame.
