= 1917 college football season =

American college football season

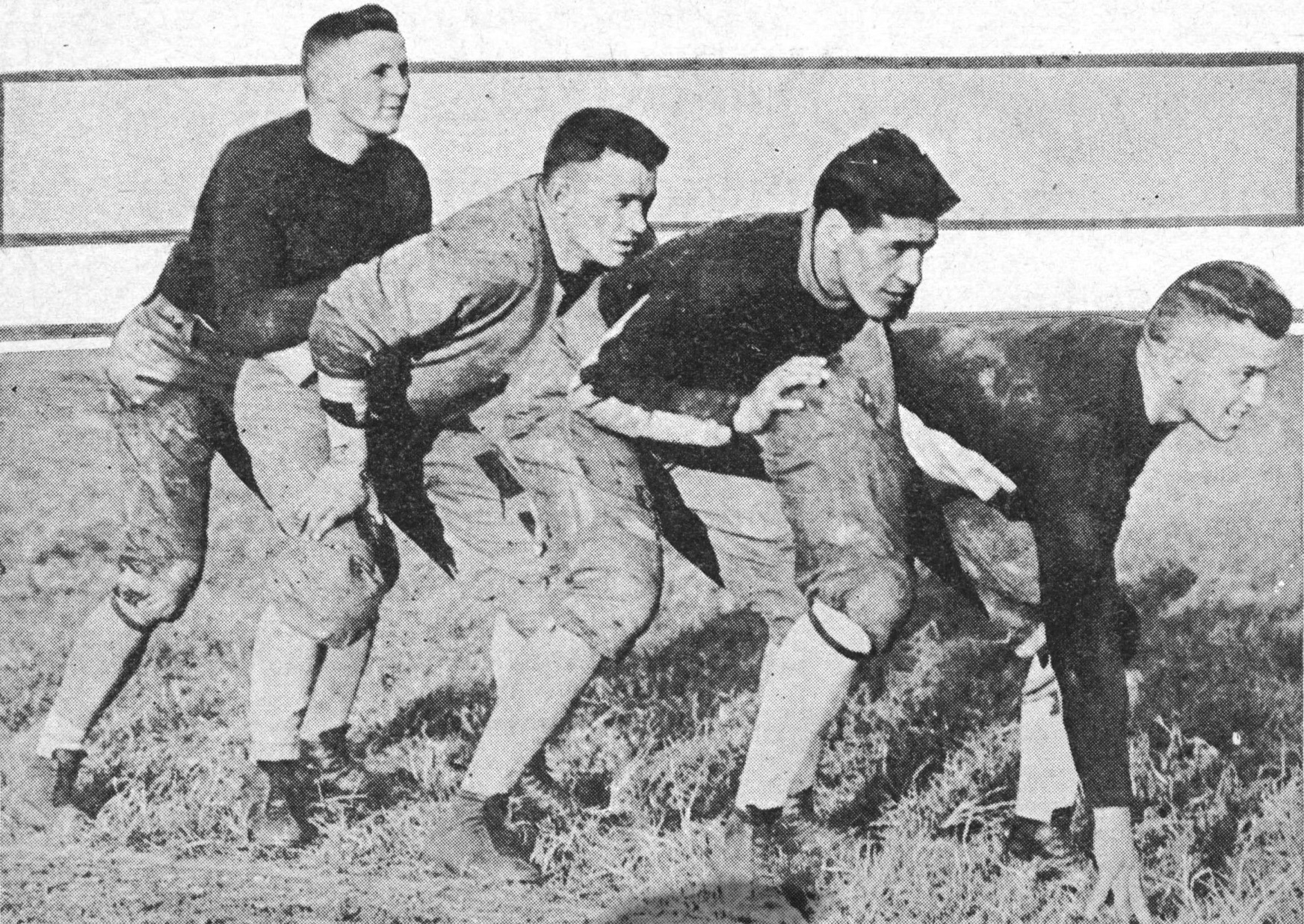
- Georgia Tech's backfield
- Number of bowls: 1
- Champion: Georgia Tech

The 1917 college football season ended with six undefeated teams in Georgia Tech, Pittsburgh, Ohio State, Texas A&M, Williams, and Washington State.

The Official NCAA Division I Football Records Book lists only Georgia Tech as national champions, the South's first.

Tech coach John Heisman challenged Pitt coach Pop Warner to a postseason contest to determine a national champion, but as such a match did not occur until the next season. The Golden Tornado was invited to play a 4–3 Oregon team in the Rose Bowl, but by then many players had joined the war effort.

In the second week of play, Georgia Tech beat Penn 41–0. Bernie McCarty called it "Strupper's finest hour, coming through against powerful Penn in the contest that shocked the East." By comparison, Pitt defeated Penn 14–6.

== Conference and program changes ==
=== Conference changes ===
- One conference changed its name for the 1917 season:
  - Michigan rejoined the Intercollegiate Conference of Faculty Representatives (commonly known as the Big Nine Conference) after a nine-year absence. As such, the league was first unofficially coined the Big Ten, the name it possesses today.

=== Membership changes ===
School	1916 Conference	1917 Conference
Michigan Wolverines	Independent	Big Ten (was Big Nine)
Montana Agricultural Bobcats	Independent	Rocky Mountain
Oglethorpe Stormy Petrels	Program Established	Independent
Southwestern (TX) Pirates	Southwest	Independent
Toledo Blue and Gold	Program Established	Independent

== September ==
September 29 In a doubleheader, Georgia Tech beat Furman and then Wake Forest; 25–0 and 33–0 respectively. Navy beat Davidson 27–6. Pitt beat West Virginia 14–9.

== October ==
October 6 Georgia Tech beat Penn at home 41 to 0. Centre beat KMI 104–0. West Virginia beat Navy 6–0. Williams beat Cornell 14–10. Texas A&M defeated Austin College 66-0.

October 13 Georgia Tech beat Davidson 32–10, its closest game all season. DePauw beat Centre 6–0. Syracuse beat Rutgers 14–10. Wisconsin tied Notre Dame 0–0. Texas A&M beat the University of Dallas 98-0.

October 20 Georgia Tech beat Washington & Lee 63–0. Auburn beat Clemson 7–0. Pittsburgh beat Syracuse 28–0. Nebraska beat Notre Dame 7–0. Washington State beat Oregon 26–3.

October 27 Undefeated Pittsburgh beat Penn on the road 14 to 6. Auburn beat Mississippi A&M 13–6. Texas A&M beat LSU 27-0.

== November ==
November 3 Georgia Tech gave Vanderbilt its worst ever beating, 83–0. Auburn crushed Florida 68–0. Centre beat Kentucky 3–0. Texas A&M beat Tulane 35–0. Wisconsin beat Minnesota 10–7. Illinois tied Chicago 0–0. Rutgers tied West Virginia 3–3.

November 10 A freshman Buck Flowers at Davidson upset Auburn 21–7. All of Georgia Tech's backs rushed for 100 yards in a 48–0 defeat of Tulane. Texas A&M beat Baylor 7–0. Ohio State beat Wisconsin 16–3. Navy beat Georgetown 28–7.

November 17 Georgia Tech beat Carlisle 98–0. Penn beat Michigan 16–0. Ohio State beat Illinois 13–0.

November 24 Auburn fought undefeated Ohio State to a scoreless tie. Coach Heisman of Georgia Tech (who previously coached at Auburn) and his players were at the game, rooting for the Tigers. Minnesota beat Illinois 27–6.

November 29 Georgia Tech beat Auburn 68 to 7. Davidson beat Clemson 21–9. Mississippi A&M beat Haskell 7–6. Texas A&M beat Rice 10-0, wrapping up an undefeated, untied and unscored-upon season, a feat they would replicate two years later. The Aggies outscored their opponents 270-0 in eight games in 1917.

== Rose Bowl ==
The Mare Island Marines defeated Camp Lewis, 19–7, in the 1918 Rose Bowl.

== Conference standings ==
=== Major conference standings ===
1917 Big Ten Conference football standings
	Conf.					Overall
Team	W		L		T	W		L		T
Ohio State $	4	–	0	–	0	8	–	0	–	1
Minnesota	3	–	1	–	0	4	–	1	–	0
Northwestern	3	–	2	–	0	5	–	2	–	0
Wisconsin	3	–	2	–	0	4	–	2	–	1
Illinois	2	–	2	–	1	5	–	2	–	1
Chicago	2	–	2	–	1	3	–	2	–	1
Indiana	1	–	2	–	0	5	–	2	–	0
Michigan	0	–	1	–	0	8	–	2	–	0
Iowa	0	–	2	–	0	3	–	5	–	0
Purdue	0	–	4	–	0	3	–	4	–	0
$ – Conference champion

1917 Missouri Valley Conference football standings
	Conf.					Overall
Team	W		L		T	W		L		T
Nebraska $	2	–	0	–	0	5	–	2	–	0
Kansas	3	–	1	–	0	6	–	2	–	0
Iowa State	3	–	1	–	0	5	–	2	–	0
Kansas State	2	–	2	–	0	6	–	2	–	0
Missouri	2	–	4	–	0	3	–	5	–	0
Washington University	1	–	2	–	0	4	–	3	–	0
Drake	0	–	3	–	0	0	–	5	–	2
$ – Conference champion

1917 Northwest Conference football standings
	Conf.					Overall
Team	W		L		T	W		L		T
Washington State $	5	–	0	–	0	6	–	0	–	1
Oregon Agricultural	2	–	1	–	1	4	–	2	–	1
Washington	1	–	1	–	1	1	–	2	–	1
Oregon	1	–	2	–	0	3	–	3	–	0
Idaho	1	–	3	–	0	2	–	3	–	0
Whitman	0	–	3	–	0	1	–	4	–	0
$ – Conference champion

1917 Pacific Coast Conference football standings
	Conf.					Overall
Team	W		L		T	W		L		T
Washington State $	3	–	0	–	0	6	–	0	–	1
California	2	–	1	–	0	5	–	5	–	1
Oregon Agricultural	1	–	2	–	1	4	–	2	–	1
Oregon	1	–	2	–	0	3	–	3	–	0
Washington	0	–	2	–	1	1	–	2	–	1
$ – Conference champion

1917 Rocky Mountain Conference football standings
	Conf.					Overall
Team	W		L		T	W		L		T
Denver $	6	–	0	–	0	9	–	0	–	0
Utah Agricultural	4	–	0	–	0	7	–	0	–	1
Colorado	4	–	2	–	0	6	–	2	–	0
Colorado Mines	2	–	3	–	0	5	–	3	–	0
Colorado College	2	–	3	–	0	3	–	3	–	0
Utah	2	–	3	–	0	2	–	4	–	0
Wyoming	1	–	4	–	0	3	–	4	–	0
Montana State	0	–	1	–	2	0	–	2	–	2
Colorado Agricultural	0	–	7	–	1	1	–	7	–	1
$ – Conference champion

1917 Southern Intercollegiate Athletic Association football standings
	Conf.					Overall
Team	W		L		T	W		L		T
Georgia Tech $	4	–	0	–	0	9	–	0	–	0
Auburn	5	–	1	–	0	6	–	2	–	1
Clemson	5	–	1	–	0	6	–	2	–	0
Centre	1	–	0	–	0	7	–	1	–	0
Mississippi A&M	3	–	1	–	0	6	–	1	–	0
Alabama	3	–	1	–	1	5	–	2	–	1
Sewanee	4	–	2	–	1	5	–	2	–	1
Tulane	2	–	1	–	0	5	–	3	–	0
Vanderbilt	3	–	2	–	0	5	–	3	–	0
LSU	2	–	3	–	0	3	–	5	–	0
South Carolina	2	–	3	–	0	3	–	5	–	0
Wofford	1	–	2	–	0	5	–	4	–	0
Furman	1	–	3	–	0	3	–	5	–	0
Florida	1	–	3	–	0	2	–	4	–	0
Ole Miss	1	–	4	–	0	1	–	4	–	1
Howard (AL)	0	–	2	–	1	3	–	3	–	1
The Citadel	0	–	2	–	0	3	–	3	–	0
Mississippi College	0	–	4	–	0	0	–	5	–	0
$ – Conference champion; There were several SIAA schools that did not field a team due to World War I.

1917 Southwest Conference football standings
	Conf.					Overall
Team	W		L		T	W		L		T
Texas A&M $	3	–	0	–	0	8	–	0	–	0
Baylor	2	–	1	–	0	6	–	2	–	1
Rice	1	–	1	–	0	7	–	1	–	0
Oklahoma	1	–	1	–	1	6	–	4	–	1
Texas	2	–	4	–	0	4	–	4	–	0
Oklahoma A&M	1	–	2	–	0	4	–	4	–	0
Arkansas	0	–	1	–	1	5	–	1	–	1
$ – Conference champion

=== Independents ===
1917 military service football records
	Conf.			Overall
Team	W	L	T	W		L		T
Mare Island Marines		–		8	–	0	–	0
Mineola Aviation Station		–		3	–	0	–	0
Camp Dix		–		2	–	0	–	0
Camp Jackson		–		2	–	0	–	1
Allentown Ambulance Corps		–		5	–	1	–	0
Camp Custer		–		5	–	1	–	0
Camp Gordon		–		5	–	1	–	0
Charlestown Navy Yard		–		3	–	1	–	0
Camp Funston		–		7	–	3	–	0
Camp Lewis		–		5	–	2	–	1
Newport Naval Reserves		–		5	–	2	–	1
Camp Grant		–		3	–	1	–	0
Camp Taylor		–		2	–	1	–	0
Great Lakes Navy		–		4	–	3	–	0
Camp Devens		–		1	–	3	–	2
Camp Meade		–		1	–	2	–	0
League Island Marines		–		1	–	3	–	0
Camp Upton		–		0	–	1	–	0

1917 Eastern college football independents records
	Conf.			Overall
Team	W	L	T	W		L		T
Pittsburgh		–		10	–	0	–	0
Williams		–		7	–	0	–	1
Yale		–		3	–	0	–	0
Princeton		–		2	–	0	–	0
Syracuse		–		8	–	1	–	1
Army		–		7	–	1	–	0
Rutgers		–		7	–	1	–	1
Penn		–		9	–	2	–	0
Brown		–		8	–	2	–	0
Fordham		–		7	–	2	–	0
Lehigh		–		7	–	2	–	0
Boston College		–		6	–	2	–	0
Swarthmore		–		6	–	2	–	0
Washington & Jefferson		–		7	–	3	–	0
Colgate		–		4	–	2	–	0
Harvard		–		3	–	1	–	3
New Hampshire		–		3	–	2	–	2
Dartmouth		–		5	–	3	–	0
Geneva		–		5	–	3	–	1
Penn State		–		5	–	4	–	0
Buffalo		–		4	–	4	–	0
NYU		–		2	–	2	–	3
Tufts		–		3	–	3	–	0
Carnegie Tech		–		2	–	3	–	1
Bucknell		–		3	–	5	–	1
Lafayette		–		3	–	5	–	0
Holy Cross		–		3	–	4	–	0
Rhode Island State		–		2	–	4	–	2
Carlisle		–		3	–	6	–	0
Columbia		–		2	–	4	–	0
Delaware		–		2	–	5	–	0
Cornell		–		3	–	6	–	0
Franklin & Marshall		–		2	–	6	–	0
Villanova		–		0	–	3	–	2
Temple		–		0	–	6	–	1

1917 Midwestern college football independents records
	Conf.			Overall
Team	W	L	T	W		L		T
Marquette		–		8	–	0	–	1
Detroit		–		8	–	1	–	0
Morningside		–		5	–	1	–	0
Notre Dame		–		6	–	1	–	1
Heidelberg		–		5	–	1	–	1
St. Mary's (OH)		–		7	–	2	–	0
St. Xavier		–		4	–	1	–	2
North Dakota Agricultural		–		4	–	2	–	0
Akron		–		5	–	3	–	0
Haskell		–		6	–	5	–	0
Western State Normal		–		4	–	3	–	0
Saint Louis		–		4	–	3	–	1
Michigan State Normal		–		3	–	4	–	0
Iowa State Teachers		–		2	–	3	–	0
South Dakota		–		2	–	3	–	0
Central Michigan		–		1	–	2	–	0
Lake Forest		–		2	–	5	–	0
Wabash		–		1	–	6	–	1
Toledo		–		0	–	3	–	0
Michigan Agricultural		–		0	–	9	–	0

1917 Southern college football independents records
	Conf.			Overall
Team	W	L	T	W		L		T
Middle Tennessee State Normal		–		7	–	0	–	0
Presbyterian		–		8	–	1	–	0
Navy		–		7	–	1	–	0
North Texas State Normal		–		6	–	1	–	0
Spring Hill		–		4	–	2	–	0
West Virginia		–		6	–	3	–	1
Southwest Texas State		–		5	–	3	–	0
West Tennessee State Normal		–		3	–	2	–	0
Texas Mines		–		0	–	0	–	1
Kentucky		–		3	–	5	–	1
Oglethorpe		–		1	–	2	–	0
Sam Houston Normal		–		1	–	3	–	0
Wake Forest		–		1	–	6	–	1
Marshall		–		1	–	7	–	1
Tennessee (SATC)		–		0	–	3	–	0

1917 Western college football independents records
	Conf.			Overall
Team	W	L	T	W		L		T
Saint Mary's		–		8	–	1	–	1
Hawaii		–		4	–	0	–	1
USC		–		4	–	2	–	1
New Mexico A&M		–		4	–	2	–	0
Arizona		–		3	–	2	–	0
New Mexico		–		1	–	2	–	0
University Farm		–		1	–	2	–	0
Nevada		–		1	–	3	–	0
Montana		–		1	–	4	–	0

=== Minor conferences ===
Conference	Champion(s)	Record
Central Intercollegiate Athletics Association	Virginia Union	2–0
Inter-Normal Athletic Conference of Wisconsin	La Crosse Normal	3–0
Kansas Collegiate Athletic Conference	Kansas State Normal; Kansas State Normal–Fort Hays	5–0–1; 5–0
Louisiana Intercollegiate Athletic Association	Southwestern Louisiana Industrial	5–0
Michigan Intercollegiate Athletic Association	Alma	4–0
Nebraska Intercollegiate Conference	Unknown	—
Ohio Athletic Conference	Miami (OH)	5–0–1
Oklahoma Intercollegiate Conference	No champion	—
Southern California Intercollegiate Athletic Conference	Pomona–Pitzer	4–0
Southern Intercollegiate Athletic Conference	Tuskegee	—

=== Minor conference standings ===
1917 Colored Intercollegiate Athletic Association football standings
	Conf.					Overall
Team	W		L		T	W		L		T
Virginia Union $	2	–	0	–	0	4	–	0	–	0
Hampton	2	–	1	–	0	4	–	1	–	0
Lincoln (PA)	1	–	1	–	0	1	–	1	–	0
Howard	0	–	3	–	0	0	–	4	–	0
$ – Conference champion

1917 Eastern Virginia Intercollegiate Athletic Association football standings
	Conf.					Overall
Team	W		L		T	W		L		T
Hampden–Sydney $	5	–	0	–	1	5	–	2	–	2
Richmond	4	–	1	–	1	4	–	2	–	1
William & Mary	2	–	4	–	0	3	–	5	–	0
Randolph–Macon	0	–	6	–	0	0	–	0	–	7
$ – Conference champion

1917 Illinois Intercollegiate Athletic Conference football standings
	Conf.					Overall
Team	W		L		T	W		L		T
Carthage	3	–	0	–	0	4	–	1	–	1
Southern Illinois			–			3	–	2	–	3

1917 Kansas Collegiate Athletic Conference football standings
	Conf.					Overall
Team	W		L		T	W		L		T
Hays Normal $	6	–	0	–	0	7	–	0	–	0
Kansas State Normal	5	–	0	–	1	5	–	3	–	1
College of Emporia	6	–	2	–	0	6	–	2	–	0
Southwestern (KS)	6	–	3	–	0	6	–	4	–	0
St. Mary's (KS)	4	–	2	–	0	6	–	3	–	0
Pittsburg Normal	3	–	2	–	1	4	–	3	–	2
Fairmount	3	–	3	–	2	3	–	3	–	2
Friends	3	–	3	–	1	3	–	5	–	1
Baker	3	–	4	–	1	3	–	5	–	1
Ottawa	2	–	4	–	1	2	–	5	–	1
Washburn	2	–	5	–	2	2	–	6	–	2
Cooper	2	–	5	–	1	2	–	5	–	1
Bethany (KS)	3	–	6	–	0	3	–	7	–	0
Midland	0	–	4	–	0	4	–	5	–	0
Kansas Wesleyan	0	–	6	–	0	1	–	8	–	0
$ – Conference champion

1917 Michigan Intercollegiate Athletic Association football standings
	Conf.					Overall
Team	W		L		T	W		L		T
Alma $	4	–	0	–	0	6	–	1	–	0
Kalamazoo	4	–	1	–	0	5	–	5	–	0
Albion	2	–	2	–	0	3	–	3	–	0
Olivet	2	–	3	–	0	3	–	3	–	0
Adrian	0	–	2	–	0	0	–	3	–	0
Hillsdale	0	–	4	–	0	0	–	5	–	0
$ – Conference champion

1917 Missouri Intercollegiate Athletic Association football standings
	Conf.					Overall
Team	W		L		T	W		L		T
Drury +	3	–	0	–	0	7	–	0	–	0
Missouri Wesleyan +	5	–	0	–	1	7	–	0	–	1
William Jewell +	5	–	0	–	1	5	–	1	–	1
Central (MO)	3	–	2	–	0	3	–	2	–	0
Springfield Normal	3	–	2	–	0	3	–	2	–	0
Tarkio	3	–	3	–	0	4	–	4	–	0
Westminster (MO)	2	–	4	–	0	2	–	6	–	0
Kirksville Normal	1	–	5	–	0	1	–	5	–	0
Cape Girardeau Normal	0	–	2	–	0	2	–	3	–	0
Maryville Normal	0	–	7	–	0	0	–	8	–	0
+ – Conference co-champions

1917 Ohio Athletic Conference football standings
	Conf.					Overall
Team	W		L		T	W		L		T
Miami (OH) $	5	–	0	–	1	6	–	0	–	2
Wooster	5	–	0	–	3	6	–	0	–	3
Wittenberg	4	–	1	–	0	5	–	2	–	0
Oberlin	4	–	1	–	0	5	–	2	–	1
Akron	3	–	1	–	0	5	–	3	–	0
Denison	2	–	2	–	0	5	–	3	–	0
Ohio Wesleyan	3	–	3	–	1	4	–	3	–	1
Western Reserve	3	–	3	–	1	3	–	5	–	1
Ohio	3	–	3	–	0	3	–	5	–	0
Case	3	–	4	–	1	3	–	6	–	1
Kenyon	2	–	3	–	1	3	–	3	–	1
Mount Union	1	–	5	–	0	2	–	6	–	0
Ohio Northern	0	–	4	–	0	3	–	4	–	0
Baldwin–Wallace	0	–	7	–	0	1	–	8	–	0
Cincinnati	0	–	4	–	0	0	–	6	–	0
Ohio State *	3	–	0	–	0	8	–	0	–	1
$ – Conference champion; * – did not complete for championship

1917 South Atlantic Intercollegiate Athletic Association football standings
	Conf.					Overall
Team	W		L		T	W		L		T
Georgetown $	2	–	0	–	0	8	–	1	–	0
Richmond	2	–	1	–	0	4	–	2	–	1
Washington and Lee	2	–	1	–	0	4	–	3	–	0
North Carolina A&M	2	–	1	–	1	6	–	2	–	1
VPI	2	–	1	–	1	6	–	2	–	1
Maryland State	2	–	1	–	1	4	–	3	–	1
Davidson	1	–	2	–	0	6	–	4	–	0
VMI	1	–	3	–	1	4	–	4	–	1
St. John's (MD)	0	–	1	–	0	0	–	1	–	0
Johns Hopkins	0	–	1	–	0	0	–	3	–	0
William & Mary	0	–	3	–	0	3	–	5	–	0
$ – Conference champion

1917 Wisconsin Normal Athletic Conference football standings
	Conf.					Overall
Team	W		L		T	W		L		T
La Crosse Normal $	3	–	0	–	0	4	–	1	–	0
River Falls Normal	3	–	1	–	0	5	–	2	–	0
Whitewater Normal	2	–	1	–	0	4	–	2	–	0
Stevens Point Normal	2	–	1	–	1	5	–	1	–	1
Platteville Normal	2	–	2	–	0	2	–	4	–	0
Stout Normal	2	–	2	–	0	2	–	2	–	0
Superior Normal	1	–	2	–	1	1	–	2	–	2
Oshkosh Normal	1	–	2	–	0	2	–	4	–	1
Eau Claire Normal	0	–	2	–	0	0	–	2	–	0
Milwaukee Normal	0	–	3	–	0	1	–	5	–	0
$ – Conference champion

== Awards and honors ==
=== All-Americans ===
The consensus All-America team included:

Position	Name	Height	Weight (lbs.)	Class	Hometown	Team
QB	Benny Boynton	5'9"	163	So.	Waco, Texas	Williams
HB	Elmer Oliphant	5'7"	180	Sr.	Bloomfield, Indiana	Army
HB	Everett Strupper	5'7"	148	Sr.	Columbus, Georgia	Georgia Tech
FB	Chic Harley	5'11"	171	Jr.	Chicago, Illinois	Ohio State
E	Charles Bolen			Sr.	Marion, Indiana	Ohio State
E	Heinie Miller	5'10"	185	Jr.	Williamsport, Pennsylvania	Penn
T	George Hauser			Sr.	Council Bluffs, Iowa	Minnesota
G	Dale Sies	6'1"	203	Sr.	Ames, Iowa	Pittsburgh
G	Jock Sutherland			Sr.	Coupar Angus, Scotland	Pittsburgh
C	Frank Rydzewski	6'1"	220	Sr.	Chicago, Illinois	Notre Dame
G	Eugene Neeley			Sr.	Dallas, Texas	Dartmouth
T	Alf Cobb	5'11"	210	Sr.	Athol, Massachusetts	Syracuse
E	Paul Robeson	6'3"	219	Jr.	Princeton, New Jersey	Rutgers

== Statistical leaders ==
- Team scoring most points: Georgia Tech, 491
- Player scoring most points: Bill Ingram, Navy, 162
- Player scoring most touchdowns: Albert Hill, Georgia Tech, 23
- Player scoring most goals after touchdown: Bill Fincher, Georgia Tech, 49
- Rushing yards leader: Everett Strupper, Georgia Tech, 1150
- Rushing avg. leader: Everett Strupper, 10.1
