= 1917 Delaware Fightin' Blue Hens football team =

American college football season

1917 Delaware Fightin' Blue Hens football
- Conference: Independent
- Record: 2–5
- Head coach: Stan Baumgartner (1st season)
- Captain: Ernest S. Wilson
- Home stadium: Frazer Field

1917 Southern college football independents records
	Conf.			Overall
Team	W	L	T	W		L		T
Middle Tennessee State Normal		–		7	–	0	–	0
Presbyterian		–		8	–	1	–	0
Navy		–		7	–	1	–	0
North Texas State Normal		–		6	–	1	–	0
Spring Hill		–		4	–	2	–	0
West Virginia		–		6	–	3	–	1
Southwest Texas State		–		5	–	3	–	0
West Tennessee State Normal		–		3	–	2	–	0
Texas Mines		–		0	–	0	–	1
Kentucky		–		3	–	5	–	1
Oglethorpe		–		1	–	2	–	0
Sam Houston Normal		–		1	–	3	–	0
Wake Forest		–		1	–	6	–	1
Marshall		–		1	–	7	–	1
Tennessee (SATC)		–		0	–	3	–	0

The 1917 Delaware Fightin' Blue Hens football team was an American football team that represented Delaware College (later renamed the University of Delaware) as an independent during the 1917 college football season. In its first and only season under head coach Stan Baumgartner, the team compiled a 2–5 record and was outscored by a total of 108 to 20. Ernest S. Wilson was the team captain. The team played its home games at Frazer Field in Newark, Delaware.

== Schedule ==
Date	Opponent	Site	Result	Attendance	Source
October 6	at Maryland State	College Park, MD	L 0–20		
October 13	at Haverford	Haverford, PA	W 7–0		
October 20	Western Maryland	Frazer Field; Newark, DE	L 0–10		
October 27	Dickinson	Frazer Field; Newark, DE	L 0–9		
November 3	Gallaudet	Frazer Field; Newark, DE	W 13–7		
November 10	at Stevens	Hoboken, NJ	L 0–35		
November 17	Swarthmore	Frazer Field; Newark, DE	L 0–27		
