= 1917 Big Ten Conference football season =

1917 Western Conference football season
- Sport: Football
- Champion: Ohio State

Football seasons
- ← 1916 1918 →

1917 Big Ten Conference football standings
	Conf.					Overall
Team	W		L		T	W		L		T
Ohio State $	4	–	0	–	0	8	–	0	–	1
Minnesota	3	–	1	–	0	4	–	1	–	0
Northwestern	3	–	2	–	0	5	–	2	–	0
Wisconsin	3	–	2	–	0	4	–	2	–	1
Illinois	2	–	2	–	1	5	–	2	–	1
Chicago	2	–	2	–	1	3	–	2	–	1
Indiana	1	–	2	–	0	5	–	2	–	0
Michigan	0	–	1	–	0	8	–	2	–	0
Iowa	0	–	2	–	0	3	–	5	–	0
Purdue	0	–	4	–	0	3	–	4	–	0
$ – Conference champion

The 1917 Big Ten Conference football season was the twenty-second season of college football played by the member schools of the Big Ten Conference and was a part of the 1917 college football season. Michigan's return brought membership up to ten schools, and this was the first year the Western Conference was referred to as the "Big Ten".

== Season overview ==
Ohio State repeated as conference champions with a 4-0 league record, 8-0-1 overall.

Minnesota came in second at 4-1 (3-1 Big Ten) while Northwestern and Wisconsin tied for third at 3–2 in Big Ten play.

Illinois and Chicago tied for fifth with league records of 2–2–1. At 5-2 (1-2 Big Ten), Indiana came in seventh.

Michigan (0–1), Iowa (0–2), and Purdue (0–4) went winless in conference play.

=== Ohio State ===
Date	Opponent	Site	Result	Attendance	Source
September 29	Case	Ohio Field; Columbus, OH	W 49–0		
October 6	Ohio Wesleyan	Ohio Field; Columbus, OH	W 53–0		
October 13	Northwestern	Ohio Field; Columbus, OH	W 40–0		
October 27	Denison	Ohio Field; Columbus, OH	W 67–0		
November 3	vs. Indiana	Washington Park; Indianapolis, IN	W 26–3		
November 10	at Wisconsin	Camp Randall Stadium; Madison, WI	W 16–3		
November 17	Illinois	Ohio Field; Columbus, OH (rivalry)	W 13–0		
November 24	vs. Auburn*	Soldiers Field; Montgomery, AL	T 0–0	10,000	
November 29	Camp Sherman (Chillicothe)*	Ohio Field; Columbus, OH	W 28–0		
*Non-conference game

=== Minnesota ===
Date	Opponent	Site	Result	Attendance	Source
October 13	South Dakota State*	Northrop Field; Minneapolis, MN	W 64–0		
October 20	Indiana	Northrop Field; Minneapolis, MN	W 33–9		
November 3	at Wisconsin	Camp Randall Stadium; Madison, WI (rivalry)	L 7–10	12,000	
November 17	Chicago	Northrop Field; Minneapolis, MN	W 33–0	14,000–16,000	
November 24	at Illinois	Illinois Field; Champaign, IL	W 27–6	4,500	
*Non-conference game

=== Northwestern ===
Date	Opponent	Site	Result	Attendance	Source
October 6	Lake Forest*	Northwestern Field; Evanston, IL	W 48–0		
October 13	at Ohio State	Ohio Field; Columbus, OH	L 0–40		
October 27	Chicago	Northwestern Field; Evanston, IL	L 0–7	12,000	
November 3	at Purdue	Stuart Field; West Lafayette, IN	W 12–6		
November 10	Michigan Agricultural*	Northwestern Field; Evanston, IL	W 39–6		
November 17	Iowa	Northwestern Field; Evanston, IL	W 25–14		
November 24	Michigan	Northwestern Field; Evanston, IL (rivalry)	W 21–12	5,232	
*Non-conference game

=== Wisconsin ===
Date	Opponent	Site	Result	Attendance	Source
October 6	Beloit*	Camp Randall Stadium; Madison, WI	W 34–0		
October 13	Notre Dame*	Camp Randall Stadium; Madison, WI	T 0–0		
October 20	at Illinois	Illinois Field; Champaign, IL	L 0–7		
October 27	Iowa	Camp Randall Stadium; Madison, WI (rivalry)	W 20–0		
November 3	Minnesota^{†}	Camp Randall Stadium; Madison, WI (rivalry)	W 10–7	12,000	
November 10	Ohio State	Camp Randall Stadium; Madison, WI	L 3–16		
November 24	at Chicago	Stagg Field; Chicago, IL	W 18–0		
*Non-conference game; ^{†}Homecoming

=== Illinois ===
Date	Opponent	Site	Result	Attendance	Source
October 6	Kansas*	Illinois Field; Champaign, IL	W 22–0		
October 13	Oklahoma*	Illinois Field; Champaign, IL	W 44–0		
October 20	Wisconsin	Illinois Field; Champaign, IL	W 7–0		
October 27	Purdue	Illinois Field; Champaign, IL (rivalry)	W 27–0		
November 3	at Chicago	Stagg Field; Chicago, IL	T 0–0	20,000	
November 17	at Ohio State	Ohio Field; Columbus, OH (rivalry)	L 0–13		
November 24	Minnesota	Illinois Field; Champaign, IL	L 6–27	4,500	
November 29	at Camp Funston*	Fort Riley, KS	W 28–0		
*Non-conference game

=== Chicago ===
Date	Opponent	Site	Result	Attendance	Source
October 13	Vanderbilt*	Stagg Field; Chicago, IL	W 48–0		
October 20	Purdue	Stagg Field; Chicago, IL(rivalry)	W 27–0		
October 27	Northwestern	Stagg Field; Chicago, IL	W 7–0	12,000	
November 3	Illinois	Stagg Field; Chicago, IL	T 0–0	20,000	
November 17	at Minnesota	Northrop Field; Minneapolis, MN	L 0–33	16,000	
November 24	Wisconsin	Stagg Field; Chicago, IL	L 0–18		
*Non-conference game

=== Indiana ===
Date	Opponent	Site	Result	Source
September 29	Franklin (IN)*	Jordan Field; Bloomington, IN	W 50–0	
October 6	Wabash*	Jordan Field; Bloomington, IN	W 51–0	
October 13	Saint Louis*	Jordan Field; Bloomington, IN	W 40–0	
October 27	at Minnesota	Northrop Field; Minneapolis, MN	L 9–33	
November 3	vs. Ohio State	Washington Park; Indianapolis, IN	L 3–26	
November 10	DePauw	Jordan Field; Bloomington, IN	W 35–0	
November 24	at Purdue	Stuart Field; West Lafayette, IN (rivalry)	W 37–0	
*Non-conference game

=== Michigan ===
Date	Opponent	Site	Result	Attendance
October 6	Case*	Ferry Field; Ann Arbor, MI	W 41–0	4,035
October 10	Western State Normal*	Ferry Field; Ann Arbor, MI	W 17–13	2,906
October 13	Mount Union*	Ferry Field; Ann Arbor, MI	W 69–0	3,657
October 17	Detroit*	Ferry Field; Ann Arbor, MI	W 14–3	4,419
October 20	Michigan Agricultural*	Ferry Field; Ann Arbor, MI (rivalry)	W 27–0	9,038
October 27	Nebraska*	Ferry Field; Ann Arbor, MI	W 20–0	5,022
November 3	Kalamazoo*	Ferry Field; Ann Arbor, MI	W 62–0	4,345
November 10	Cornell*^{†}	Ferry Field; Ann Arbor, MI	W 42–0	16,733
November 17	at Penn*	Franklin Field; Philadelphia, PA	L 0–16	12,851
November 24	at Northwestern	Northwestern Field; Evanston, IL (rivalry)	L 12–21	5,232
*Non-conference game; ^{†}Homecoming

=== Iowa ===
Date	Opponent	Site	Result
October 6	Cornell (IA)*	Iowa Field; Iowa City, IA	W 22–13
October 13	Nebraska*	Nebraska Field; Lincoln, NE (rivalry)	L 0–47
October 20	Grinnell*	Iowa Field; Iowa City, IA	L 0–10
October 27	at Wisconsin	Camp Randall Stadium; Madison, WI (rivalry)	L 0–20
November 3	Great Lakes Navy*	Iowa Field; Iowa City, IA	L 14–23
November 10	South Dakota*	Iowa Field; Iowa City, IA	W 35–0
November 17	at Northwestern	Northwestern Field; Evanston, IL	L 14–25
November 24	Iowa State*^{†}	Iowa Field; Iowa City, IA (rivalry)	W 6–3
*Non-conference game; ^{†}Homecoming

=== Purdue ===
Date	Opponent	Site	Result	Attendance	Source
October 6	Franklin (IN)*	Stuart Field; West Lafayette, IN	W 54–0		
October 13	DePauw*	Stuart Field; West Lafayette, IN	W 7–6		
October 21	at Chicago	Stagg Field; Chicago, IL (rivalry)	L 0–27		
October 27	at Illinois	Illinois Field; Champaign, IL (rivalry)	L 0–27		
November 3	Northwestern	Stuart Field; West Lafayette, IN	L 6–12		
November 17	Wabash*	Stuart Field; West Lafayette, IN	W 28–0		
November 24	Indiana	Stuart Field; West Lafayette, IN (Old Oaken Bucket)	L 0–37		
*Non-conference game

=== Bowl games ===
No Western Conference schools participated in any bowl games during the 1917 season.

== All-American honors ==
=== Ends ===
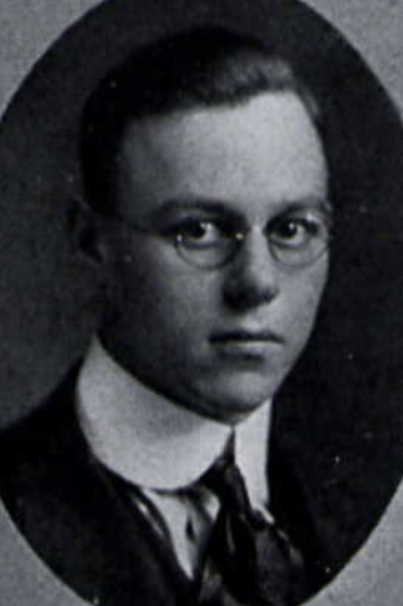
Charles Bolen.

- **Charles Bolen**, Ohio State (MS; WE-1; JV-2; PP-1; DJ)

=== Tackles ===
- **George Hauser**, Minnesota (WE-1; JV-1; PP-1)
- Albert Benbrook, Michigan; Ft. Sheridan (College Football Hall of Fame) (PPS)

=== Guards ===
- Frank Culver, Michigan (JV-2; PP-1)
- Ernest Allmendinger, Michigan; Ft. Sheridan (WC-1)
- C. G. Higgins, Chicago (MS; WE-2)
- John Ulrich, Northwestern (WE-2)

=== Centers ===
- Paul Des Jardien, Chicago; Ft. Sheridan (College Football Hall of Fame) (PPS)
- Oscar P. Lambert, Michigan (WE-2)

=== Quarterbacks ===
- Archie Weston, Michigan (WE-1)

=== Fullbacks ===
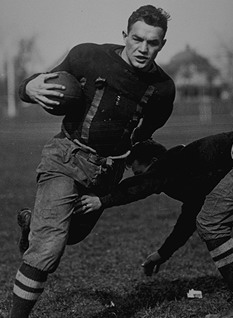
Chic Harley.

- **Chic Harley**, Ohio State (College Football Hall of Fame) (WE-1; JV-1; PP-1; DJ)
- Cedric C. Smith, Michigan; Great Lakes (WC-1)
- Bob Koehler, Northwestern (WE-2)

=== Key ===
NCAA recognized selectors for 1917

- WC = Collier's Weekly All Service team as selected by Walter Camp
- JV = Jack Veiock of the International News Service
- PP = Paul Purman, noted sports writer whose All-American team was syndicated in newspapers across the United States, of the Newspaper Editors Association
- PPS = Paul Purman's All Service selection
- MS = Frank Menke Syndicate, by Frank G. Menke

Other selectors

- WE = Walter Eckersall, of the Chicago Tribune
- DJ = Dick Jemison, of the Atlanta Constitution.
- NYT = All Service eleven of The New York Times.

Bold = Consensus All-American

- 1 – First-team selection
- 2 – Second-team selection
- 3 – Third-team selection

== All-Big Ten selections ==
=== Ends ===
- Charles Bolen, Ohio State (FM, HP, LA, LGS, PD)
- W. M. Kelley, Wisconsin (FM, GWA, LA, LGS, PD)
- Charles Laun, Iowa (GWA)
- Alan Boyd, Michigan (HP)

=== Tackles ===
- George Hauser, Minnesota (FM, HB, GWA, LA, LGS, PD)
- Harold J. Courtney, Ohio State (LA, LGS, PD [guard])

=== Guards ===
- Charles Higgins, Chicago (FM, GWA, LA, PD)
- Elmert T. Rundquist, Illinois (FM [tackle], LA, LGS)
- Conrad L. Eklund, Minnesota (GWA, LGS, PD [tackle])
- John Ulrich, Northwestern (FM)
- Joseph Hanish, Michigan (HP)
- Whiting, Camp Grant – Chicago (REAL)

=== Centers ===
- Frank Culver, Michigan (HP)
- Pottinger, Great Lakes Naval Training Station – Wisconsin (REAL)

=== Quarterbacks ===
- Archie Weston, Michigan (FM, LA [halfback], LGS)
- Eber Simpson, Wisconsin (LA, PD)
- Howard Yerges Sr., Ohio State (GWA)

=== Halfbacks ===
- Chic Harley, Ohio State (FM, GWA, HP, LA, LGS) (CFHOF)
- Eber Simpson, Wisconsin (GWA)
- James B. Craig, Fort Sheridan / Michigan (REAL)

=== Fullbacks ===
- Bob Koehler, Northwestern (FM, GWA, LA, LGS)
- Cedric C. Smith, Great Lakes Naval Training Station / Michigan (REAL)
