= 1917 Michigan State Normal Normalites football team =

American college football season

1917 Michigan State Normal Normalites football
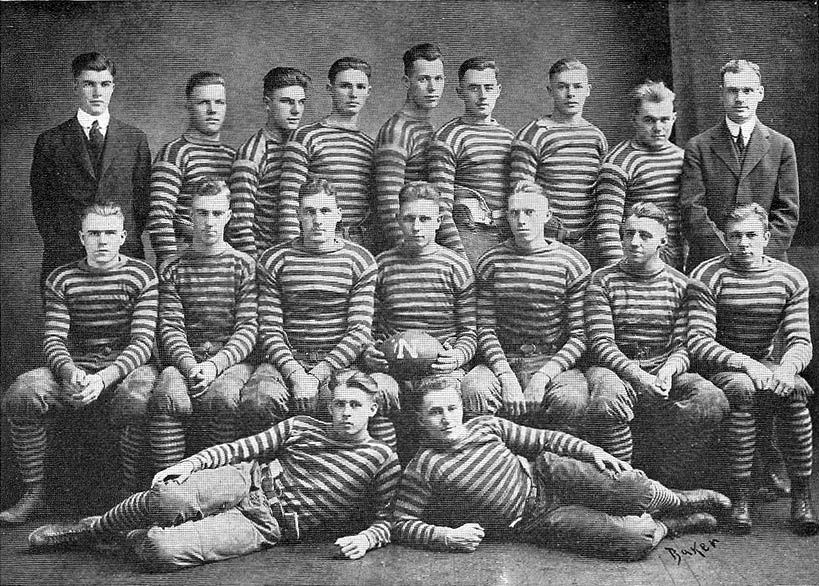
- Conference: Independent
- Record: 3–4
- Head coach: Elton Rynearson (1st season)
- Captain: Andrus P. Wilson

1917 Midwestern college football independents records
	Conf.			Overall
Team	W	L	T	W		L		T
Marquette		–		8	–	0	–	1
Detroit		–		8	–	1	–	0
Morningside		–		5	–	1	–	0
Notre Dame		–		6	–	1	–	1
Heidelberg		–		5	–	1	–	1
St. Mary's (OH)		–		7	–	2	–	0
St. Xavier		–		4	–	1	–	2
North Dakota Agricultural		–		4	–	2	–	0
Akron		–		5	–	3	–	0
Haskell		–		6	–	5	–	0
Western State Normal		–		4	–	3	–	0
Saint Louis		–		4	–	3	–	1
Michigan State Normal		–		3	–	4	–	0
Iowa State Teachers		–		2	–	3	–	0
South Dakota		–		2	–	3	–	0
Central Michigan		–		1	–	2	–	0
Lake Forest		–		2	–	5	–	0
Wabash		–		1	–	6	–	1
Toledo		–		0	–	3	–	0
Michigan Agricultural		–		0	–	9	–	0

The 1917 Michigan State Normal Normalites football team represented Michigan State Normal College (later renamed Eastern Michigan University) as an independent during the 1917 college football season. In their first season under head coach Elton Rynearson, the Normalites compiled a record of 3–4 and outscored their opponents by a combined total of 111 to 80. Andrus P. Wilson was the team captain.

In the summer of 1917, previous head coach Elmer Mitchell resigned to accept a coaching position with the University of Michigan. Elton Rynearson was hired as his replacement in July 1917. Rynearson was 24 years old at the time and had been coaching previously at the Polish Seminary in Orchard Lake, Michigan. Rynearson served 26 years as the school's head football coach, compiling a record of 114–58–15 (.648), and his teams outscored their opponents, 2,574 to 1,415.

== Schedule ==
Date	Opponent	Site	Result	Source
October 13	at Michigan freshmen	Ferry Field; Ann Arbor, MI	L 0–18	
October 17	at Assumption (ON)	College Field, Sandwich; Windsor, ON	W 28–0	
October 20	Central Michigan	Ypsilanti, MI (rivalry)	W 63–0	
October 27	Olivet	Ypsilanti, MI	L 0–19	
November 3	at Alma	Alma, MI	L 0–27	
November 10	Michigan Agricultural freshmen	Ypsilanti, MI	L 7–13	
November 24	at Hillsdale	Hillsdale, MI	W 13–3	
