= Oscar Lambert =

American lawyer

Oscar Parmenas Lambert
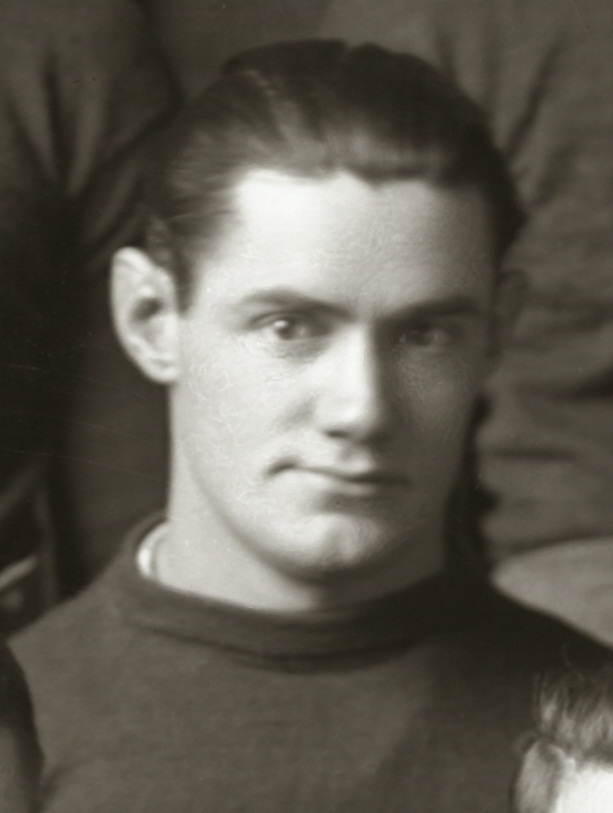
- Lambert cropped from 1917 Michigan team portrait

Profile
- Position: Center

Personal information
- Born: October 25, 1890; Pennsboro, West Virginia
- Died: May 27, 1970 (aged 79); Lakewood, Ohio

Career information
- College: Michigan

Career history
- 1911–1913: West Virginia Wesleyan
- 1917: Michigan

Awards and highlights
- Second-team All-American, 1917; First-team All-Western, 1917

Oscar Parmenas "Paddy" Lambert (October 25, 1890 – May 27, 1970) was an American football, basketball, baseball, table tennis, and chess player. He played college football for West Virginia Wesleyan College from 1912 to 1913 and was captain of the school's 1913 football team. He also played at first base for the West Virginia Wesleyan baseball team. While attending law school at the University of Michigan, he played for the 1917 Michigan Wolverines football team and was selected as a second-team All-American and a first-team All-Western player. Lambert later practiced as a lawyer in Ohio.

== Early life ==
Lambert was born in Pennsboro, West Virginia in 1890. He was the son of Isaac H. Lambert (born May 1847) and Mary A. Lambert (born March 1853). At the time of the 1900 Census, Lambert was living with his parents and two older brothers on a farm in Clay, West Virginia. In 1910, he was living in Clay, West Virginia, with his mother and one older brother (a brakeman for the Baltimore & Ohio Railroad).

== West Virginia Wesleyan ==
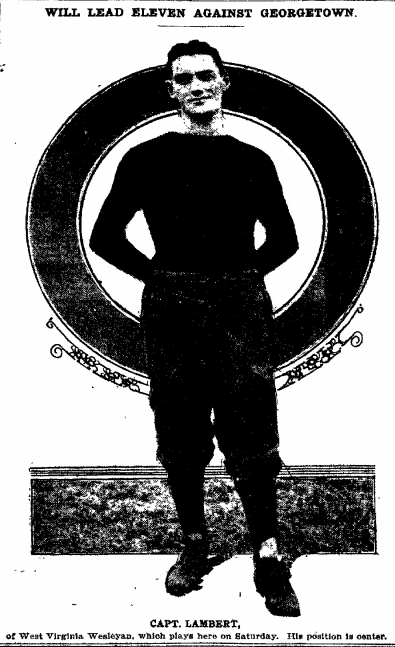
Lambert from The Washington Post, Nov. 1913.

Lambert attended West Virginia Wesleyan College in Buckhannon, West Virginia. Between 1912 and 1914, he played first base for the school's baseball team and center for the football team. College and Pro Football Hall of Fame inductee Greasy Neale was Lambert's teammate on the West Virginia Wesleyan football and baseball teams.

In 1912, the West Virginia Wesleyan football team, with Lambert and Neale in the lineup, compiled a perfect 8–0 record and outscored opponents 380 to 14. Seven of the eight games were shutouts, including a 59–0 victory over the Marshall Thundering Herd, a 103–0 victory over Davis & Elkins College, and a 95–0 victory over Fairmont State. The only team to score on the 1912 Wesleyan team was West Virginia, a game Wesleyan won by a score of 19–14.

At the end of the 1912 season, Lambert was elected as the captain of the 1913 team. In 1913, the Wesleyan team defeated West Virginia (21–0), Marshall (13-0) and Georgetown (16–6), but lost games against college football powerhouses, including a Carlisle Indians team coached by Pop Warner and a Washington & Jefferson Presidents that was ranked as one of the new "Big 4 of College Football."

There are some sources indicating that Lambert may have also played football for Marshall College and West Virginia. A September 1915 article in The Sun of Baltimore noted that "Paddie Lambert, the old Marshall College star, has made himself solid at centre" for the West Virginia Mountaineers. Additionally, West Virginia's list of football letterman indicates that Oscar Lambert from Charleston, West Virginia played at center for the Mountaineers in 1915. Further, the roster for the 1917 Michigan Wolverines football team refers to Lambert as having previously attended Marshall College.

Lambert may have also played baseball in the Cleveland Amateur Association League for a portion of the summer of 1916, before returning to West Virginia in mid-June.

== University of Michigan ==
After attending college in West Virginia, Lambert attended the University of Michigan Law School. He was president of the law school class of 1919. Lambert was often referred to by the nickname "Paddy" while attending Michigan.

With Lambert's enrollment at Michigan, the press anticipated that he would play for Fielding H. Yost's Michigan Wolverines football team. The Boston Evening Transcript wrote about the prospects for Michigan's 1915 football team: "It will be necessary to develop a new centre, and for this post there is Lambert, a new-comer to Ann Arbor from Wesleyan University of West Virginia, where he made an enviable reputation." Although he played for Michigan's All-Freshman team in 1915, Lambert did not play varsity football at Michigan until 1917.

At the start of the 1917 football season, Michigan's football coach, Fielding H. Yost, had only four veterans returning from the 1916 team. He found Lambert among the university's law students. The Michigan Alumnus noted: "He dug up Lambert and made him report." Another press report noted that Lambert, who had played on the All-Freshman team in 1915, was a surprise addition to the team in mid-October: "Lambert played at West Virginia several years ago and was a member of the All-Fresh in 1915. He did not play on the varsity this fall and has been in a uniform only a little over a week. He is light, but an accurate passer and a fighter." Lambert was reportedly the lightest man on the 1917 Michigan Wolverines football team at 160 pounds.

Yost did not play Lambert until the season's fourth game against the University of Detroit on October 17, 1917. Lambert had a strong showing in his first game for Michigan. The University of Michigan yearbook reported on his performance against Detroit: "The West Virginian managed to make about 50 percent of the tackles and would have made more but for the fact that the rest of the players got jealous and started to work." The same publication noted that Michigan's game with Cornell (a 42–0 win) found "Weston [Michigan's quarterback) and Lambert feeling like the historical million dollars." The Detroit Free Press credited Lambert with "opening inviting holes" for Michigan's backs in the Cornell game.

Prior to the final game of the 1917 season against Northwestern, Lambert, Archie Weston and two other Michigan players were declared ineligible. In Lambert's case, the ruling was due to a Western Conference rule limiting players to three years of varsity sport, which Lambert had used while at West Virginia Wesleyan. The Michiganensian noted: "Several little matters, like Conference rules and studies, kept several Michiganders out of the Northwestern fray ... It was decided that Lambert had played enough football, although he was ranking high in his studies." The Michigan Alumnus noted: "Since Weston had gained about 75 percent of the ground gained by Michigan this fall, and Lambert had secured nearly 90 percent of the tackles made by the defense, the loss of these men was a serious blow." On losing to Northwestern without Lambert in the lineup, Coach Yost complained that "the defense was in the law library."

At the end of the 1917 football season, Lambert was selected as a second-team All-American by Walter Eckersall of the Chicago Tribune. Eckersall also placed Lambert on his All-Western team.

While attending Michigan, Lambert was also a member of the Griffins, the Archons, the Barristers, Sigma Chi, Phi Delta Phi, and Michigamua. He was also chosen to serve as a student member of the university's Board in Control of Athletics for the year 1918–19.

== Later life ==
After graduating from Michigan, Lambert practiced law in Ohio. At the time of the 1930 Census, he was living in Youngstown, Ohio and working as an attorney for a steel corporation. In his later years, Lambert lived and practiced law in Cleveland, Ohio. In his draft registration card completed following the U.S. entry into World War II, Lambert indicated that he was living in Cleveland and self-employed. Lambert never married and died in 1970 at St. Luke's Hospital in Cleveland; he was a resident of Lakewood, Ohio at the time of his death.
