= 1917 Haskell Indians football team =

American college football season

1917 Haskell Indians football
- Conference: Independent
- Record: 6–5
- Head coach: Antonio Lubo (1st season)
- Captain: "Pep" Black
- Home stadium: Haskell Field

1917 Midwestern college football independents records
	Conf.			Overall
Team	W	L	T	W		L		T
Marquette		–		8	–	0	–	1
Detroit		–		8	–	1	–	0
Morningside		–		5	–	1	–	0
Notre Dame		–		6	–	1	–	1
Heidelberg		–		5	–	1	–	1
St. Mary's (OH)		–		7	–	2	–	0
St. Xavier		–		4	–	1	–	2
North Dakota Agricultural		–		4	–	2	–	0
Akron		–		5	–	3	–	0
Haskell		–		6	–	5	–	0
Western State Normal		–		4	–	3	–	0
Saint Louis		–		4	–	3	–	1
Michigan State Normal		–		3	–	4	–	0
Iowa State Teachers		–		2	–	3	–	0
South Dakota		–		2	–	3	–	0
Central Michigan		–		1	–	2	–	0
Lake Forest		–		2	–	5	–	0
Wabash		–		1	–	6	–	1
Toledo		–		0	–	3	–	0
Michigan Agricultural		–		0	–	9	–	0

The 1917 Haskell Indians football team was an American football team that represented the Haskell Indian Institute (now known as Haskell Indian Nations University) as an independent during the 1917 college football season. In its first and only season under head coach Antonio Lubo, Haskell compiled a 6–5 record. "Pep" Black was the team captain.

== Schedule ==
Date	Opponent	Site	Result	Attendance	Source
September 29	Ottawa	Lawrence, KS	W 13–0		
October 5	Friends	Lawrence, KS	W 12–0		
October 13	at Kendall	Tulsa, OK	W 12–7		
October 20	at Kansas State Normal	Emporia, KS	W 7–5		
October 25	at Great Lakes Navy	Station athletic field; Lake Bluff, IL	L 16–20	10,000	
October 27	at Marquette	Milwaukee, WI	L 0–28		
November 3	at Rice	Rice Field; Houston, TX	L 13–55		
November 9	Warrensbug Normal	Haskell Field; Lawrence, KS	W 66–7		
November 17	at Creighton	Omaha, NE	L 0–19		
November 24	Kansas Wesleyan	Haskell Field; Lawrence, KS	W 86–7		
November 29	vs. Mississippi A&M	Russwood Park; Memphis, TN	L 6–7		
