= 1917 Morningside Maroons football team =

American college football season

1917 Morningside Maroons football
- Conference: Independent
- Record: 5–1
- Head coach: Jason M. Saunderson (5th season)
- Home stadium: Bass Field

1917 Midwestern college football independents records
	Conf.			Overall
Team	W	L	T	W		L		T
Marquette		–		8	–	0	–	1
Detroit		–		8	–	1	–	0
Morningside		–		5	–	1	–	0
Notre Dame		–		6	–	1	–	1
Heidelberg		–		5	–	1	–	1
St. Mary's (OH)		–		7	–	2	–	0
St. Xavier		–		4	–	1	–	2
North Dakota Agricultural		–		4	–	2	–	0
Akron		–		5	–	3	–	0
Haskell		–		6	–	5	–	0
Western State Normal		–		4	–	3	–	0
Saint Louis		–		4	–	3	–	1
Michigan State Normal		–		3	–	4	–	0
Iowa State Teachers		–		2	–	3	–	0
South Dakota		–		2	–	3	–	0
Central Michigan		–		1	–	2	–	0
Lake Forest		–		2	–	5	–	0
Wabash		–		1	–	6	–	1
Toledo		–		0	–	3	–	0
Michigan Agricultural		–		0	–	9	–	0

The 1917 Morningside Maroons football team represented the Morningside College during the 1917 college football season. In Jason M. Saunderson's fifth season with the Maroons, Morningside compiled a 5–1 record, and outscored their opponents 207 to 27.

== Schedule ==
Date	Opponent	Site	Result	Source
	Trinity (IA)		W 62–7	
October 20	Nebraska Wesleyan	Bass Field; Sioux City, IA	W 79–0	
October 27	at Dakota Wesleyan (SD)	Mitchell, SD	W 33–0	
November 10	Notre Dame	Bass Field; Sioux City, IA	L 0–13	
November 17	at Dubuque	Dubuque, IA	W 19–0	
November 29	South Dakota	Bass Field; Sioux City, IA	W 14–7	
