= 1917 North Dakota Agricultural Aggies football team =

American college football season

1917 North Dakota Agricultural Aggies football
- Conference: Independent
- Record: 4–2
- Head coach: Paul J. Davis (3rd season)
- Captain: Bill Nemzek
- Home stadium: Dacotah Field

1917 Midwestern college football independents records
	Conf.			Overall
Team	W	L	T	W		L		T
Marquette		–		8	–	0	–	1
Detroit		–		8	–	1	–	0
Morningside		–		5	–	1	–	0
Notre Dame		–		6	–	1	–	1
Heidelberg		–		5	–	1	–	1
St. Mary's (OH)		–		7	–	2	–	0
St. Xavier		–		4	–	1	–	2
North Dakota Agricultural		–		4	–	2	–	0
Akron		–		5	–	3	–	0
Haskell		–		6	–	5	–	0
Western State Normal		–		4	–	3	–	0
Saint Louis		–		4	–	3	–	1
Michigan State Normal		–		3	–	4	–	0
Iowa State Teachers		–		2	–	3	–	0
South Dakota		–		2	–	3	–	0
Central Michigan		–		1	–	2	–	0
Lake Forest		–		2	–	5	–	0
Wabash		–		1	–	6	–	1
Toledo		–		0	–	3	–	0
Michigan Agricultural		–		0	–	9	–	0

The 1917 North Dakota Agricultural Aggies football team was an American football team that represented North Dakota Agricultural College (now known as North Dakota State University) as an independent during the 1917 college football season. In their third year under head coach Paul J. Davis, the team compiled a 4–2 record.

== Schedule ==
Date	Opponent	Site	Result	Source
October 13	at St. Thomas (MN)	Cadet Field; St. Paul, MN	L 0–14	
October 20	Macalester	Dacotah Field; Fargo, ND	W 13–0	
October 26	Hamline	Dacotah Field; Fargo, ND	W 28–0	
November 3	North Dakota	Dacotah Field; Fargo, ND (rivalry)	W 20–7	
November 10	Fargo	Dacotah Field; Fargo, ND	W 79–0	
November 16	at South Dakota State	Brookings, SD (rivalry)	L 14–21	
