= 1917 Toledo Blue and Gold football team =

American college football season

1917 Toledo Blue and Gold football
- Conference: Independent
- Record: 0–3
- Head coach: John Brandeberry (1st season)
- Captain: Ken Keller

1917 Midwestern college football independents records
	Conf.			Overall
Team	W	L	T	W		L		T
Marquette		–		8	–	0	–	1
Detroit		–		8	–	1	–	0
Morningside		–		5	–	1	–	0
Notre Dame		–		6	–	1	–	1
Heidelberg		–		5	–	1	–	1
St. Mary's (OH)		–		7	–	2	–	0
St. Xavier		–		4	–	1	–	2
North Dakota Agricultural		–		4	–	2	–	0
Akron		–		5	–	3	–	0
Haskell		–		6	–	5	–	0
Western State Normal		–		4	–	3	–	0
Saint Louis		–		4	–	3	–	1
Michigan State Normal		–		3	–	4	–	0
Iowa State Teachers		–		2	–	3	–	0
South Dakota		–		2	–	3	–	0
Central Michigan		–		1	–	2	–	0
Lake Forest		–		2	–	5	–	0
Wabash		–		1	–	6	–	1
Toledo		–		0	–	3	–	0
Michigan Agricultural		–		0	–	9	–	0

The 1917 Toledo Blue and Gold football team was an American football team that represented Toledo University (renamed the University of Toledo in 1967) as an independent during the 1917 college football season. In their first season fielding a varsity football team, the Blue and Gold were coached by engineering professor John Brandeberry, compiled a 0–3 record, failed to score a point, and were outscored by all opponents by a combined total of 262 to 0. The school losses to the University of Detroit and Ohio Northern by scores of 145 to 0 and 90 to 0, respectively, remain the worst defeats in program history. The team's 13 members were required to purchase their own uniforms and had no practice scrimmages before the first game against Detroit. Ken Keller was the team captain.

== Schedule ==
Date	Opponent	Site	Result	Attendance	Source
October 10	at Detroit	University of Detroit athletic field; Detroit, MI	L 0–145		
October 20	at Ohio Northern	Ada, OH	L 0–90		
October 30	at Findlay	Findlay, OH	L 0–27		
