= 1917 Michigan Agricultural Aggies football team =

American college football season

1917 Michigan Agricultural Aggies football
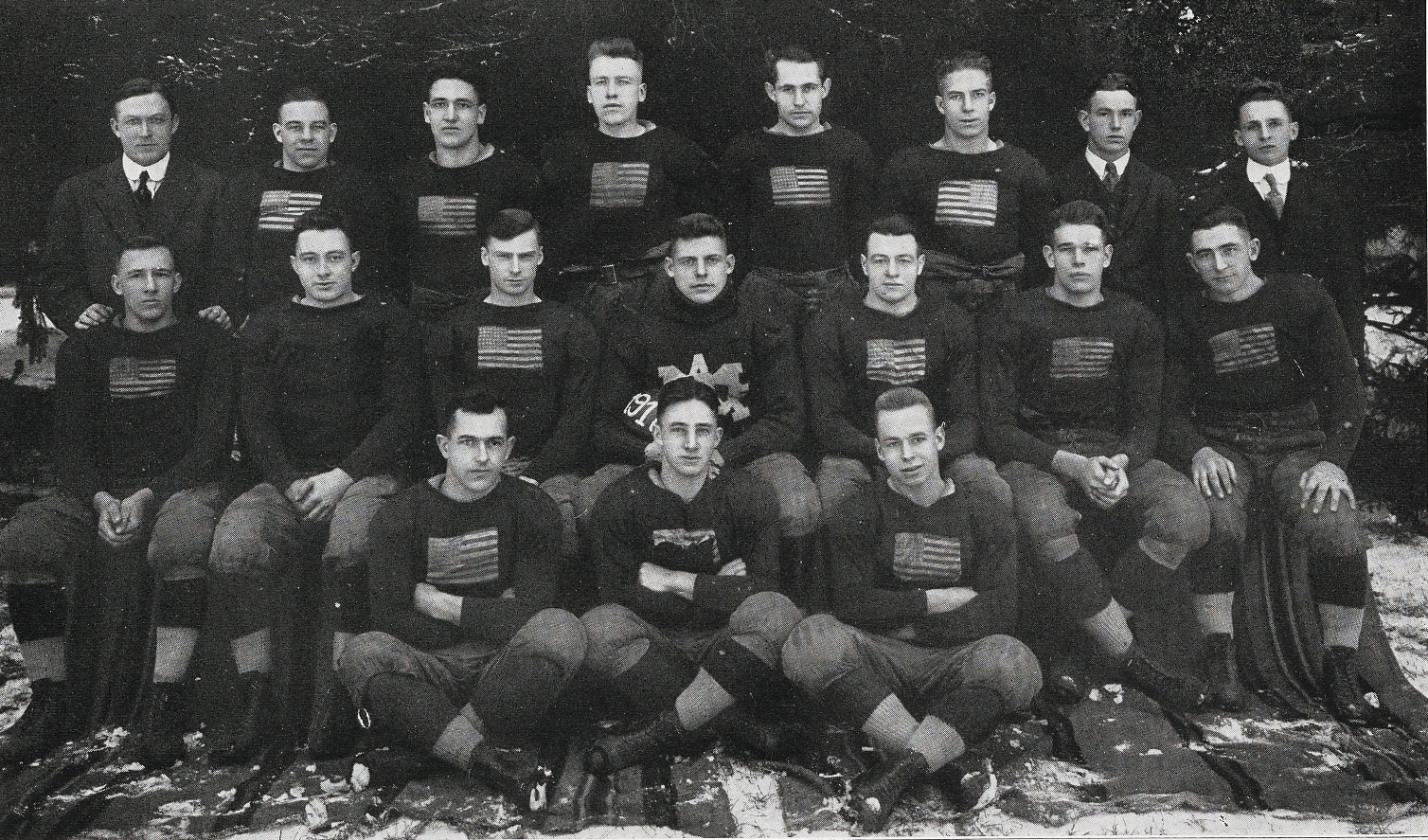
- Conference: Independent
- Record: 0–9
- Head coach: Chester Brewer (9th season)
- Captain: Sherman Coryell
- Home stadium: College Field

1917 Midwestern college football independents records
	Conf.			Overall
Team	W	L	T	W		L		T
Marquette		–		8	–	0	–	1
Detroit		–		8	–	1	–	0
Morningside		–		5	–	1	–	0
Notre Dame		–		6	–	1	–	1
Heidelberg		–		5	–	1	–	1
St. Mary's (OH)		–		7	–	2	–	0
St. Xavier		–		4	–	1	–	2
North Dakota Agricultural		–		4	–	2	–	0
Akron		–		5	–	3	–	0
Haskell		–		6	–	5	–	0
Western State Normal		–		4	–	3	–	0
Saint Louis		–		4	–	3	–	1
Michigan State Normal		–		3	–	4	–	0
Iowa State Teachers		–		2	–	3	–	0
South Dakota		–		2	–	3	–	0
Central Michigan		–		1	–	2	–	0
Lake Forest		–		2	–	5	–	0
Wabash		–		1	–	6	–	1
Toledo		–		0	–	3	–	0
Michigan Agricultural		–		0	–	9	–	0

The 1917 Michigan Agricultural Aggies football team represented Michigan Agricultural College (MAC) as an independent during the 1917 college football season. In their ninth non-consecutive year under head coach Chester Brewer (Brewer previously coached the Aggies from 1903 to 1910), the Aggies compiled a 0–9 record and were outscored by their opponents 179 to 23.

This season marks the only time in team history in which they went winless on the field; in 1994, the Spartans finished with a 5–6 record, but this was changed to 0-11 after an academic scandal led to the forfeiture of their victories.

== Schedule ==
Date	Opponent	Site	Result	Attendance	Source
October 6	Alma	College Field; East Lansing, MI	L 7–14		
October 13	Kalamazoo	College Field; East Lansing, MI	L 3–7		
October 20	at Michigan	Ferry Field; Ann Arbor, MI (rivalry)	L 0–27	9,038	
October 27	Detroit	College Field; East Lansing, MI	L 0–14		
November 3	Western State Normal	College Field; East Lansing, MI	L 0–14		
November 10	at Northwestern	Northwestern Field; Evanston, IL	L 6–39		
November 17	at Notre Dame	Cartier Field; South Bend, IN (rivalry)	L 0–23		
November 24	Syracuse^{†}	College Field; East Lansing, MI	L 7–21		
November 29	Camp MacArthur	College Field; East Lansing, MI	L 0–20		
^{†}Homecoming

== Game summaries ==
=== Michigan ===
Michigan at Michigan Agricultural

Team	1	2	3	4	Total
• Michigan	6	0	7	14	27
Michigan Agricultural	0	0	0	0	0

- Date: October 20, 1917
- Location: College Field
  East Lansing, MI

On October 20, 1917, the Aggies played their annual game against Michigan at Ferry Field. It was the 12th game between the two schools dating back to 1898. Michigan had won eight of the prior 11 games. Michigan won the 1917 game by a score of 27 to 0. Michigan scored in the first quarter on a drive that featured a 30-yard run by Tad Wieman and was capped by a 15-yard touchdown run by Archie Weston. At halftime, the schools' combined bands led a detachment of troops onto the field and played the "Star Spangled Banner" and "The Victors". In the third quarter, the Wolverines scoring drive began with a 20-yard punt return by Weston with Wieman scoring on a seven-yard run. In the fourth quarter, Wieman ran through the middle of the M.A.C. line, "shook off five tacklers," and scored on a 35-yard touchdown run. Later in the fourth quarter, Weston ran 30 yards around the left end to the M.A.C. 12-yard line, and Wieman scored his third touchdown of the afternoon on a one-yard run.
