= 1917 Central Michigan Normalites football team =

American college football season

1917 Central Michigan Normalites football
- Conference: Independent
- Record: 1–2
- Head coach: Fred Johnson (1st season)

1917 Midwestern college football independents records
	Conf.			Overall
Team	W	L	T	W		L		T
Marquette		–		8	–	0	–	1
Detroit		–		8	–	1	–	0
Morningside		–		5	–	1	–	0
Notre Dame		–		6	–	1	–	1
Heidelberg		–		5	–	1	–	1
St. Mary's (OH)		–		7	–	2	–	0
St. Xavier		–		4	–	1	–	2
North Dakota Agricultural		–		4	–	2	–	0
Akron		–		5	–	3	–	0
Haskell		–		6	–	5	–	0
Western State Normal		–		4	–	3	–	0
Saint Louis		–		4	–	3	–	1
Michigan State Normal		–		3	–	4	–	0
Iowa State Teachers		–		2	–	3	–	0
South Dakota		–		2	–	3	–	0
Central Michigan		–		1	–	2	–	0
Lake Forest		–		2	–	5	–	0
Wabash		–		1	–	6	–	1
Toledo		–		0	–	3	–	0
Michigan Agricultural		–		0	–	9	–	0

The 1917 Central Michigan Normalites football team represented Central Michigan Normal School, later renamed Central Michigan University, as an independent during the 1917 college football season. In their first and only season under head coach Fred Johnson, the Central Michigan football team compiled a 1–2 record and were outscored by their opponents by a combined total of 70 to 7. In its only intercollegiate game, the team lost to the 1917 Michigan State Normal Normalites football team by a score of 63 to 0 at Ypsilanti, Michigan, on October 20, 1917. The Detroit Free Press reported: "Mt. Pleaaant failed to make a first down and gained only about 15 yards in the entire game, their team being light and lacking experience." The team's remaining games were against high school teams: a 7-0 victory over Bay City Western High School and an 8-0 loss to Mt. Pleasant High School.

== Schedule ==
Date	Opponent	Site	Result	Source
October 13	Bay City Western High School		W 7–0	
October 20	at Michigan State Normal	Ypsilanti, MI (rivalry)	L 0–63	
November 16	Mount Pleasant High School	Mount Pleasant, MI	L 0–8	
