= 1917 St. Xavier Saints football team =

American college football season

1917 St. Xavier Saints football
- Conference: Independent
- Record: 4–1–2
- Head coach: None

1917 Midwestern college football independents records
| | Conf. | | | Overall |
| Team | W | L | T | W | | L | | T |
|---|---|---|---|---|---|---|---|---|
| Marquette | | – | | 8 | – | 0 | – | 1 |
| Detroit | | – | | 8 | – | 1 | – | 0 |
| Morningside | | – | | 5 | – | 1 | – | 0 |
| Notre Dame | | – | | 6 | – | 1 | – | 1 |
| Heidelberg | | – | | 5 | – | 1 | – | 1 |
| St. Mary's (OH) | | – | | 7 | – | 2 | – | 0 |
| St. Xavier | | – | | 4 | – | 1 | – | 2 |
| North Dakota Agricultural | | – | | 4 | – | 2 | – | 0 |
| Akron | | – | | 5 | – | 3 | – | 0 |
| Haskell | | – | | 6 | – | 5 | – | 0 |
| Western State Normal | | – | | 4 | – | 3 | – | 0 |
| Saint Louis | | – | | 4 | – | 3 | – | 1 |
| Michigan State Normal | | – | | 3 | – | 4 | – | 0 |
| Iowa State Teachers | | – | | 2 | – | 3 | – | 0 |
| South Dakota | | – | | 2 | – | 3 | – | 0 |
| Central Michigan | | – | | 1 | – | 2 | – | 0 |
| Lake Forest | | – | | 2 | – | 5 | – | 0 |
| Wabash | | – | | 1 | – | 6 | – | 1 |
| Toledo | | – | | 0 | – | 3 | – | 0 |
| Michigan Agricultural | | – | | 0 | – | 9 | – | 0 |

The 1917 St. Xavier Musketeers football team was an American football team that represented St. Xavier College (later renamed Xavier University) as an independent during the 1917 college football season. The team compiled a 4–1–2 record but was outscored by a total of 40 to 39. The team had no head coach.

== Schedule ==
| Date | Opponent | Site | Result | Attendance | Source |
|---|---|---|---|---|---|
| October 13 | St. Mary's (OH) | Cincinnati, OH | W 7–3 | | |
| October 20 | Wilmington (OH) | Cincinnati, OH | T 0–0 | | |
| October 27 | Kentucky Wesleyan | Avondale; Cincinnati, OH | W 6–0 | | |
| November 3 | at Kentucky Military Institute | Lyndon, KY | W 13–6 | | |
| November 10 | Georgetown (KY) | Georgetown, KY | L 0–19 | | |
| November 17 | at Wilmington (OH) | Wilmington, OH | W 7–6 | | |
| November 29 | Fort Thomas (KY) | Redland Field; Cincinnati, OH | T 6–6 | 3,000 | |
