= 1917 Marquette Hilltoppers football team =

American college football season

1917 Marquette Hilltoppers football
- Conference: Independent
- Record: 8–0–1
- Head coach: John J. Ryan (1st season)

1917 Midwestern college football independents records
	Conf.			Overall
Team	W	L	T	W		L		T
Marquette		–		8	–	0	–	1
Detroit		–		8	–	1	–	0
Morningside		–		5	–	1	–	0
Notre Dame		–		6	–	1	–	1
Heidelberg		–		5	–	1	–	1
St. Mary's (OH)		–		7	–	2	–	0
St. Xavier		–		4	–	1	–	2
North Dakota Agricultural		–		4	–	2	–	0
Akron		–		5	–	3	–	0
Haskell		–		6	–	5	–	0
Western State Normal		–		4	–	3	–	0
Saint Louis		–		4	–	3	–	1
Michigan State Normal		–		3	–	4	–	0
Iowa State Teachers		–		2	–	3	–	0
South Dakota		–		2	–	3	–	0
Central Michigan		–		1	–	2	–	0
Lake Forest		–		2	–	5	–	0
Wabash		–		1	–	6	–	1
Toledo		–		0	–	3	–	0
Michigan Agricultural		–		0	–	9	–	0

The 1917 Marquette Hilltoppers football team was an American football team that represented Marquette University as an independent during the 1917 college football season. In its first season under head coach John J. Ryan, the team compiled an 8–0–1 record, shut out eight of nine opponents, and outscored all opponents by a total of 341 to 7.

== Schedule ==
Date	Opponent	Site	Result	Source
September 29	Great Lakes Navy	Milwaukee, WI	W 14–7	
October 6	St. Norbert	Milwaukee, WI	W 61–0	
October 13	Beloit	Milwaukee, WI	W 46–0	
October 20	Oshkosh Normal	Milwaukee, WI	W 103–0	
October 27	Haskell	Milwaukee, WI	W 28–0	
November 3	Saint Thomas (MN)	Milwaukee, WI	W 47–0	
November 10	at Saint Louis	Handlan's Park; St. Louis, MO	T 0–0	
November 17	North Dakota	Milwaukee, WI	W 21–0	
November 28	Wabash	Milwaukee, WI	W 21–0	
