= 1917 Saint Louis Billikens football team =

American college football season

1917 Saint Louis Billikens football
- Conference: Independent
- Record: 4–3–1
- Head coach: Charles M. Rademacher (1st season)
- Home stadium: Handlan's Park, Sportsman's Park

1917 Midwestern college football independents records
	Conf.			Overall
Team	W	L	T	W		L		T
Marquette		–		8	–	0	–	1
Detroit		–		8	–	1	–	0
Morningside		–		5	–	1	–	0
Notre Dame		–		6	–	1	–	1
Heidelberg		–		5	–	1	–	1
St. Mary's (OH)		–		7	–	2	–	0
St. Xavier		–		4	–	1	–	2
North Dakota Agricultural		–		4	–	2	–	0
Akron		–		5	–	3	–	0
Haskell		–		6	–	5	–	0
Western State Normal		–		4	–	3	–	0
Saint Louis		–		4	–	3	–	1
Michigan State Normal		–		3	–	4	–	0
Iowa State Teachers		–		2	–	3	–	0
South Dakota		–		2	–	3	–	0
Central Michigan		–		1	–	2	–	0
Lake Forest		–		2	–	5	–	0
Wabash		–		1	–	6	–	1
Toledo		–		0	–	3	–	0
Michigan Agricultural		–		0	–	9	–	0

The 1917 Saint Louis Billikens football team was an American football team that represented Saint Louis University as an independent during the 1917 college football season. In their first and only season under head coach Charles M. Rademacher, the Billikens compiled a 4–3–1 record and outscored opponents by a total of 79 to 61.

== Schedule ==
Date	Time	Opponent	Site	Result	Source
October 6	3:00 p.m.	Cape Girardeau Normal	Handlan's Park; St. Louis, MO	W 34–0	
October 13		at Indiana	Jordan Field; Bloomington, IN	L 0–40	
October 20	3:00 p.m.	Drury	Handlan's Park; St. Louis, MO	L 0–7	
October 27		DePauw	Handlan's Park; St. Louis, MO	L 0–14	
November 3		Southern Illinois	Handlan's Park; St. Louis, MO	W 26–0	
November 10		Marquette	Handlan's Park; St. Louis, MO	T 0–0	
November 17		at Rose Poly	Terre Haute, IN	W 6–0	
November 29	2:30 p.m.	Washington University	Sportsman's Park; St. Louis, MO	W 13–0	
