= 1917 Detroit Tigers football team =

American college football season

1917 Detroit Tigers football
- Conference: Independent
- Record: 8–1
- Head coach: James F. Duffy (1st season)

1917 Midwestern college football independents records
	Conf.			Overall
Team	W	L	T	W		L		T
Marquette		–		8	–	0	–	1
Detroit		–		8	–	1	–	0
Morningside		–		5	–	1	–	0
Notre Dame		–		6	–	1	–	1
Heidelberg		–		5	–	1	–	1
St. Mary's (OH)		–		7	–	2	–	0
St. Xavier		–		4	–	1	–	2
North Dakota Agricultural		–		4	–	2	–	0
Akron		–		5	–	3	–	0
Haskell		–		6	–	5	–	0
Western State Normal		–		4	–	3	–	0
Saint Louis		–		4	–	3	–	1
Michigan State Normal		–		3	–	4	–	0
Iowa State Teachers		–		2	–	3	–	0
South Dakota		–		2	–	3	–	0
Central Michigan		–		1	–	2	–	0
Lake Forest		–		2	–	5	–	0
Wabash		–		1	–	6	–	1
Toledo		–		0	–	3	–	0
Michigan Agricultural		–		0	–	9	–	0

The 1917 Detroit Tigers football team represented the University of Detroit in the 1917 college football season. The team compiled an 8–1 record, shut out five opponents, and outscored all opponents by a combined total of 389 to 34. The team opened the season with a school record 145 to 0 victory over the Toledo Rockets. Its sole loss was to Michigan by a 14 to 3 score. Tillie Voss starred for the 1917 team.

== Schedule ==
Date	Opponent	Site	Result	Source
October 10	Toledo	University of Detroit athletic field; Detroit, MI	W 145–0	
October 17	at Michigan	Ferry Field; Ann Arbor, MI	L 3–14	
October 20	Kalamazoo	Elmwood Avenue gridiron; Detroit, MI	W 26–0	
October 27	at Michigan Agricultural	East Lansing, MI	W 14–0	
November 3	Northwestern College	Navin Field; Detroit, MI	W 35–0	
November 10	Rose Polytechnic	Navin Field; Detroit, MI	W 84–0	
November 17	Western State Normal	Navin Field; Detroit, MI	W 35–6	
November 24	Buffalo	Navin Field; Detroit, MI	W 20–7	
December 1	Camp MacArthur	Navin Field; Detroit, MI	W 27–7	

== Coaching changes ==
On March 3, 1917, the University of Detroit hired Gil Dobie as its head football coach. Dobie had compiled a 58–0–3 record in nine years as head football coach at the University of Washington. Dobie was lured with the promise that he need work only three months and otherwise devote himself to business. Shortly after Dobie's hiring, a game was scheduled for the fall with Fielding H. Yost's Michigan Wolverines football team.

Dobie came to Detroit and began coaching the team through early practice sessions in August, but suddenly withdrew from the post at the end of August to become head football coach at the U.S. Naval Academy. Dobie reportedly left Detroit "because he was not satisfied with the small squad" that had turned out.

James F. Duffy, a high school coach in Detroit, was hired to take over as the team's head coach. Duffy went on to coach the team for six years.
