= 1917 Notre Dame Fighting Irish football team =

American college football season

1917 Notre Dame Fighting Irish football
- Conference: Independent
- Record: 6–1–1
- Head coach: Jesse Harper (5th season)
- Offensive scheme: Single-wing
- Captain: James Phelan
- Home stadium: Cartier Field

1917 Midwestern college football independents records
	Conf.			Overall
Team	W	L	T	W		L		T
Marquette		–		8	–	0	–	1
Detroit		–		8	–	1	–	0
Morningside		–		5	–	1	–	0
Notre Dame		–		6	–	1	–	1
Heidelberg		–		5	–	1	–	1
St. Mary's (OH)		–		7	–	2	–	0
St. Xavier		–		4	–	1	–	2
North Dakota Agricultural		–		4	–	2	–	0
Akron		–		5	–	3	–	0
Haskell		–		6	–	5	–	0
Western State Normal		–		4	–	3	–	0
Saint Louis		–		4	–	3	–	1
Michigan State Normal		–		3	–	4	–	0
Iowa State Teachers		–		2	–	3	–	0
South Dakota		–		2	–	3	–	0
Central Michigan		–		1	–	2	–	0
Lake Forest		–		2	–	5	–	0
Wabash		–		1	–	6	–	1
Toledo		–		0	–	3	–	0
Michigan Agricultural		–		0	–	9	–	0

The 1917 Notre Dame Fighting Irish football team was an American football team that represented the University of Notre Dame as an independent during the 1917 college football season. In their fifth and final year under head coach Jesse Harper, the Irish compiled a 6–1–1 record, shut out six of eight opponents, and outscored all opponents by a total of 141 to 9. The team played a scoreless tie with Wisconsin in its second game and lost a close road game against Nebraska the following week, giving up the only touchdown of the season to the Cornhuskers. Notre Dame ended its season on a five-game winning streak, including a road win over Army and a shut outs against Michigan Agricultural (now Michigan State) and Washington & Jefferson.

With the United States entry into World War I, several Notre Dame players from 1916 were unavailable due to military service. Key players on the 1917 team included team captain and quarterback James Phelan, who left the team after three games for military service, and freshman end George Gipp.

Knute Rockne was assistant coach for the fourth year. In February 1918, Harper resigned as Notre Dame's head coach and athletic director. At Harper's recommendation, Rockne succeeded him in both positions.

The team played its home games at Cartier Field in Notre Dame, Indiana.

== Schedule ==
Date	Time	Opponent	Site	Result	Source
October 6	2:30 p.m.	Kalamazoo	Cartier Field; Notre Dame, IN	W 55–0	
October 13		at Wisconsin	Camp Randall Stadium; Madison, WI	T 0–0	
October 20		at Nebraska	Nebraska Field; Lincoln, NE (rivalry)	L 0–7	
October 27		South Dakota	Cartier Field; Notre Dame,, IN	W 40–0	
November 3		at Army	The Plain; West Point, NY (rivalry)	W 7–2	
November 10		at Morningside	Bass Field; Sioux City, IA	W 13–0	
November 17		Michigan Agricultural	Cartier Field; South Bend, IN (rivalry)	W 23–0	
November 24		at Washington & Jefferson	Cameron Stadium; Washington, PA	W 3–0	

== Personnel ==
=== Players ===
- William Allison
- Andrews
- Leonard Bahan
- Joseph Brandy
- Walter DeGree
- George Gipp
- David Hayes
- Tom King
- Slip Madigan - guard
- Robert McGuire
- Walter Miller
- Dudley Pearson
- James Phelan - captain, played first three games before being inducted into military service
- Philbin
- James "Big Red" Ryan
- Frank Rydzewski
- Maurice Smith
- Thomas Spaulding
- Basil Stanley
- Raleigh "Red" Stine
- Clyde Zoia

=== Coaches ===
- Head coach - Jesse Harper
- Assistant coach - Knute Rockne
