= 1917 Miami Redskins football team =

American college football season

1917 Miami Redskins football

OAC champion
- Conference: Ohio Athletic Conference
- Record: 6–0–2 (5–0–1 OAC)
- Head coach: George Rider (1st season)
- Home stadium: Miami Field

1917 Ohio Athletic Conference football standings
	Conf.					Overall
Team	W		L		T	W		L		T
Miami (OH) $	5	–	0	–	1	6	–	0	–	2
Wooster	5	–	0	–	3	6	–	0	–	3
Wittenberg	4	–	1	–	0	5	–	2	–	0
Oberlin	4	–	1	–	0	5	–	2	–	1
Akron	3	–	1	–	0	5	–	3	–	0
Denison	2	–	2	–	0	5	–	3	–	0
Ohio Wesleyan	3	–	3	–	1	4	–	3	–	1
Western Reserve	3	–	3	–	1	3	–	5	–	1
Ohio	3	–	3	–	0	3	–	5	–	0
Case	3	–	4	–	1	3	–	6	–	1
Kenyon	2	–	3	–	1	3	–	3	–	1
Mount Union	1	–	5	–	0	2	–	6	–	0
Ohio Northern	0	–	4	–	0	3	–	4	–	0
Baldwin–Wallace	0	–	7	–	0	1	–	8	–	0
Cincinnati	0	–	4	–	0	0	–	6	–	0
Ohio State *	3	–	0	–	0	8	–	0	–	1
$ – Conference champion; * – did not complete for championship

The 1917 Miami Redskins football team was an American football team that represented Miami University as a member of the Ohio Athletic Conference (OAC) during the 1917 college football season. In its first season under head coach George Rider, Miami compiled a 6–0–2 record (5–0–1 against conference opponents), held every opponent scoreless, and won the OAC championship.

The season was part of a 27-game unbeaten streak that began in November 1915 and ended in October 1919.

== Schedule ==
Date	Opponent	Site	Result
October 6	Ohio Northern	Miami Field; Oxford, OH	W 32–0
October 13	at Kentucky*	Stoll Field; Lexington, Ky	T 0–0
October 20	Earlham*	Miami Field; Oxford, OH	W 91–0
October 27	Ohio Wesleyan	Miami Field; Oxford, OH	W 20–0
November 3	vs. Denison	Dayton, OH	W 13–0
November 10	at Mount Union	Alliance, OH	W 6–0
November 17	Wooster	Miami Field; Oxford, OH	T 0–0
November 29	at Cincinnati	Cincinnati, OH (Victory Bell)	W 40–0
*Non-conference game
