= 1917 Western State Normal Hilltoppers football team =

American college football season

1917 Western State Normal Hilltoppers football
- Conference: Independent
- Record: 4–3
- Head coach: William H. Spaulding (11th season)
- Captain: Warren Allen
- Home stadium: Normal field

1917 Midwestern college football independents records
	Conf.			Overall
Team	W	L	T	W		L		T
Marquette		–		8	–	0	–	1
Detroit		–		8	–	1	–	0
Morningside		–		5	–	1	–	0
Notre Dame		–		6	–	1	–	1
Heidelberg		–		5	–	1	–	1
St. Mary's (OH)		–		7	–	2	–	0
St. Xavier		–		4	–	1	–	2
North Dakota Agricultural		–		4	–	2	–	0
Akron		–		5	–	3	–	0
Haskell		–		6	–	5	–	0
Western State Normal		–		4	–	3	–	0
Saint Louis		–		4	–	3	–	1
Michigan State Normal		–		3	–	4	–	0
Iowa State Teachers		–		2	–	3	–	0
South Dakota		–		2	–	3	–	0
Central Michigan		–		1	–	2	–	0
Lake Forest		–		2	–	5	–	0
Wabash		–		1	–	6	–	1
Toledo		–		0	–	3	–	0
Michigan Agricultural		–		0	–	9	–	0

The 1917 Western State Normal Hilltoppers football team represented Western State Normal School (later renamed Western Michigan University) as an independent during the 1917 college football season. In their 11th season under head coach William H. Spaulding, the Hilltoppers compiled a 4–3 record and outscored their opponents, 203 to 105. Tackle Warren Allen was the team captain.

== Schedule ==
Date	Time	Opponent	Site	Result	Source
October 3		Albion	Normal field; Kalamazoo, MI	W 26–6	
October 10		at Michigan	Ferry Field; Ann Arbor, MI	L 13–17	
October 20	2:15 p.m.	Notre Dame freshmen	Normal field; Kalamazoo, MI	W 83–0	
November 3		at Michigan Agricultural	College Field; East Lansing, MI	W 14–0	
November 10		Camp Custer Ambulance	Normal field; Kalamazoo, MI	W 61–7	
November 17		at Detroit	Navin Field; Detroit, MI	L 6–35	
November 24	2:30 p.m.	at Indiana Normal (PA)	Indiana, PA	L 0–40	
