= George Rider =

American sports coach and administrator (1890–1979)

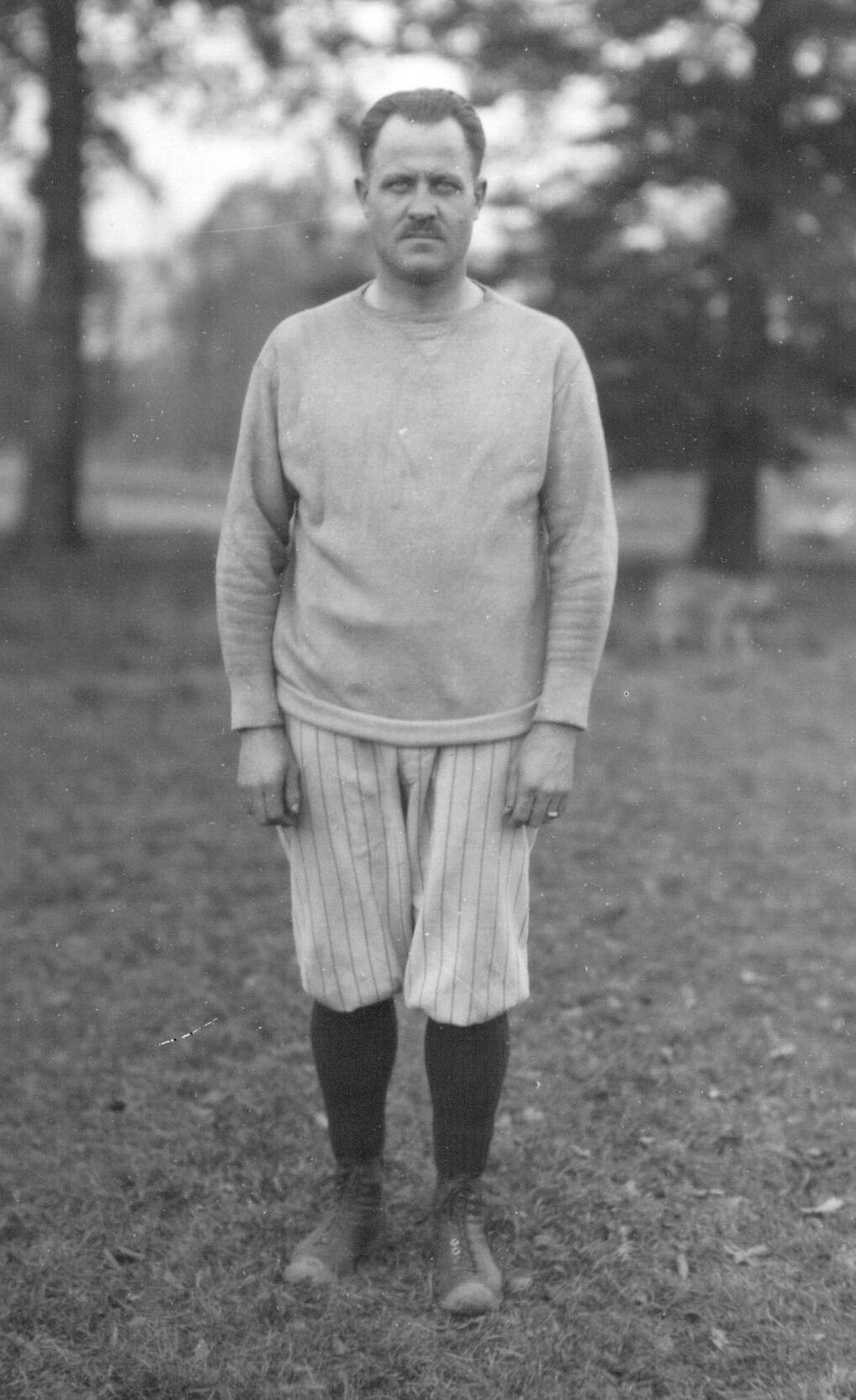
- Rider in 1925

Biographical details
- Born: December 24, 1890
- Died: August 8, 1979 (aged 88); Oxford, Ohio, U.S.
- Education: Olivet College (1914)

Coaching career (HC unless noted)

Football
- 1914: Olivet
- 1915–1916: Hanover
- 1917–1918: Miami (OH)
- 1920–1922: Washington University

Basketball
- 1914–1915: Olivet
- 1917–1919: Miami (OH)

Baseball
- 1918–1919: Miami (OH)

Track
- 1924–1960: Miami (OH)

Administrative career (AD unless noted)
- 1924–1940: Miami (OH)

Head coaching record
- Overall: 28–24–5 (football); 20–8 (basketball); 9–4 (baseball)

Accomplishments and honors

Championships
- Football; 1 MIAA (1914); 1 OAC (1917)

Awards
- Olivet College Athletic Hall of Fame (1972)

George L. Rider (December 24, 1890 – August 8, 1979) was an American athletics administrator and coach of American football, basketball, baseball, track and cross country. He served as the head football coach at Olivet College in 1914, at Hanover College from 1915 to 1916, at Miami University in Oxford, Ohio, from 1917 to 1918, and at Washington University in St. Louis from 1920 to 1922, compiling a career college football head coaching record of 28–24–5. At Miami he also coached basketball from 1917 to 1919, baseball from 1918 to 1919, and track and cross country from 1924 to 1960. In addition he served as athletic director at Miami from 1924 to 1940. In 1959 Rider served as honorary president of the International Track and Field Coaches Association. He is a charter member of Miami University's Hall of Fame along with coaching legends including Walter Alston, Earl Blaik, Paul Brown, Weeb Ewbank, Ara Parseghian. and John Pont.

Before his coaching career, Rider attended the University of Olivet where he competed on the school's football, basketball, and track and field teams.

== Coaching career ==
=== Football ===
Rider became Miami University's head coach for the 1917 and 1918 seasons because George Little was serving in the armed forces during World War I. In his two years he never lost a game and won back to back Ohio Athletic Conference championships. His 1917 football team outscored its opponents 202–0. This team went 6–0–2 with the only blemishes being scoreless ties with both Kentucky and Wooster. Rider's second season was just as successful with his team going 5–0–1. However, games against Kentucky, Wooster, and Wittenberg were canceled due to the flu pandemic. Rider stepped down when Little returned to Oxford from the war.

=== Track ===
Rider coached track and cross at Miami for 36 years, from 1924 to 1960. His track teams won nine Buckeye Conference titles and 10 consecutive Mid-American Conference championships. Also, his cross country teams captured nine Mid-American Conference Championships. In 1957, Rider was selected to the Helms Athletic Foundation Track and Field Coaches Hall of Fame. Additionally, Miami's track is named in his honor for his contributions the university athletic department.

== Death ==
Rider died in Oxford, Ohio, on August 8, 1979, at the age of 88.

== Head coaching record ==
=== Football ===
Year	Team	Overall	Conference	Standing
Olivet Crimson (Michigan Intercollegiate Athletic Association) (1914)
1914	Olivet	5–3	3–1	T–1st
Olivet:		5–3	3–1	
Hanover Panthers (Independent) (1915–1916)
1915	Hanover	2–4		
1916	Hanover	1–5		
Hanover:		3–9		
Miami Redskins (Ohio Athletic Conference) (1917–1918)
1917	Miami	6–0–2	5–0–1	1st
1918	Miami	5–0–1	4–0–1	2nd
Miami:		11–0–3	9–0–2	
Washington University Pikers (Missouri Valley Conference) (1920–1922)
1920	Washington University	4–4	1–4	6th
1921	Washington University	4–3–1	2–3	T–7th
1922	Washington University	1–5–1	0–5–1	9th
Washington University:		9–12–2	3–12–1	
Total:		28–24–5		
National championship Conference title Conference division title or championship game berth
