= Fred Johnson (American football coach) =

American football coach

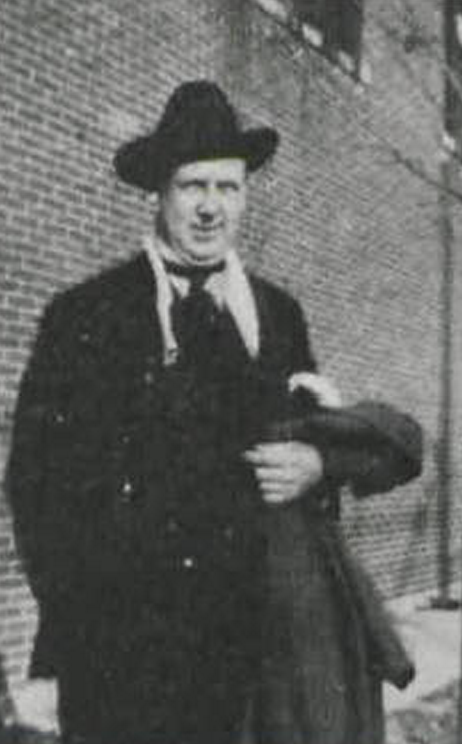
- Johnson pictured in Chippewa 1918, Central Michigan yearbook

Coaching career (HC unless noted)

Football
- 1911: South Dakota State
- 1917: Central Michigan

Basketball
- 1910–1911: South Dakota State

Head coaching record
- Overall: 5–6 (football); 2–4 (basketball)

Frederick H. Johnson was an American college football and college basketball coach. He served as the head football coach at South Dakota State College of Agriculture and Mechanic Arts —now known as South Dakota State University—in 1911 and Central Michigan Normal School—now known as Central Michigan University– in 1917.

== Head coaching record ==
=== Football ===
Year	Team	Overall	Conference	Standing	Bowl/playoffs
South Dakota State (Independent) (1917)
1911	South Dakota State	4–4			
South Dakota State:		4–4			
Central Michigan Normalites (Independent) (1917)
1917	Central Michigan	1–2			
Central Michigan:		1–2			
Total:		5–6			
