= 1917 Michigan Wolverines football team =

American college football season

1917 Michigan Wolverines football
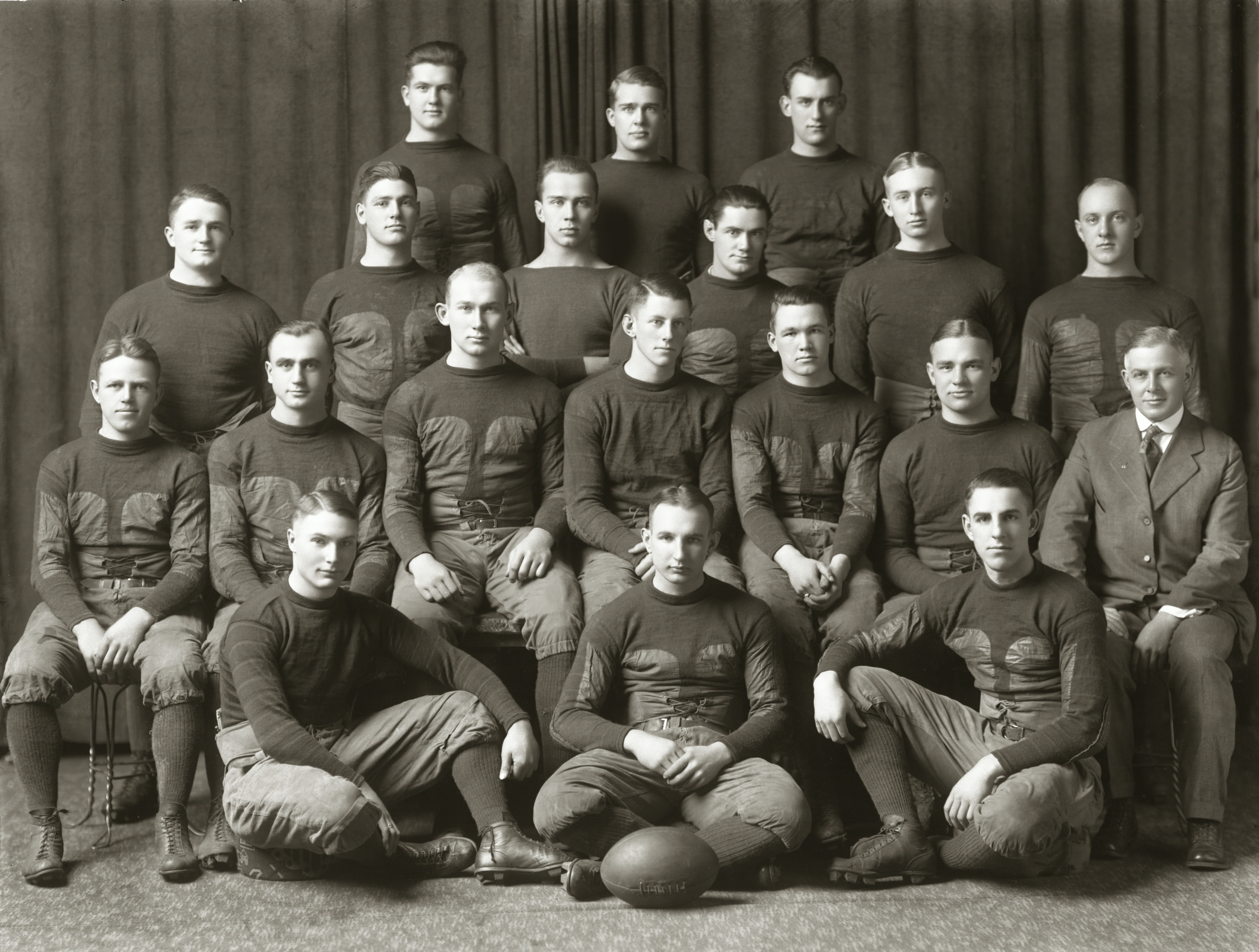
- Conference: Big Ten Conference
- Record: 8–2 (0–1 Big Ten)
- Head coach: Fielding H. Yost (17th season)
- Captain: Cedric C. Smith
- Home stadium: Ferry Field

Uniform
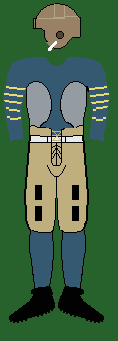

1917 Big Ten Conference football standings
	Conf.					Overall
Team	W		L		T	W		L		T
Ohio State $	4	–	0	–	0	8	–	0	–	1
Minnesota	3	–	1	–	0	4	–	1	–	0
Northwestern	3	–	2	–	0	5	–	2	–	0
Wisconsin	3	–	2	–	0	4	–	2	–	1
Illinois	2	–	2	–	1	5	–	2	–	1
Chicago	2	–	2	–	1	3	–	2	–	1
Indiana	1	–	2	–	0	5	–	2	–	0
Michigan	0	–	1	–	0	8	–	2	–	0
Iowa	0	–	2	–	0	3	–	5	–	0
Purdue	0	–	4	–	0	3	–	4	–	0
$ – Conference champion

The 1917 Michigan Wolverines football team represented the University of Michigan in the 1917 college football season. In his 17th year as head coach, Fielding H. Yost led the Michigan Wolverines football team to an 8–2 record, as Michigan outscored its opponents by a combined score of 304 to 53. Michigan won its first eight games and outscored those opponents by a combined score of 292 to 16. The team then lost its final two games against Penn and Northwestern.

With the United States entry into World War I in April 1917, Michigan's male student body dropped by 30%, and Michigan lost many of its starters to military service. The players lost to the military included fullback Cedric "Pat" Smith, who had been elected to serve as captain of the 1917 team. With only one returning backfield player, coach Yost converted tackle Tad Wieman into a fullback. Wieman became the team's leading scorer in 1917 with 129 points on 14 touchdowns, 36 points after touchdown (PAT), and three field goals. After an injury to starting quarterback Cliff Sparks in the second game, Archie Weston took over and became the team's second leading scorer with 78 points on 13 touchdowns.

== Schedule ==
Date	Opponent	Site	Result	Attendance
October 6	Case*	Ferry Field; Ann Arbor, MI	W 41–0	4,035
October 10	Western State Normal*	Ferry Field; Ann Arbor, MI	W 17–13	2,906
October 13	Mount Union*	Ferry Field; Ann Arbor, MI	W 69–0	3,657
October 17	Detroit*	Ferry Field; Ann Arbor, MI	W 14–3	4,419
October 20	Michigan Agricultural*	Ferry Field; Ann Arbor, MI (rivalry)	W 27–0	9,038
October 27	Nebraska*	Ferry Field; Ann Arbor, MI	W 20–0	5,022
November 3	Kalamazoo*	Ferry Field; Ann Arbor, MI	W 62–0	4,345
November 10	Cornell*^{†}	Ferry Field; Ann Arbor, MI	W 42–0	16,733
November 17	at Penn*	Franklin Field; Philadelphia, PA	L 0–16	12,851
November 24	at Northwestern	Northwestern Field; Evanston, IL (rivalry)	L 12–21	5,232
*Non-conference game; ^{†}Homecoming

== Season summary ==
=== Preseason ===
On April 6, 1917, the United States declared war on the German Empire, marking its entry into World War I. In early August 1917, the National Collegiate Athletic Association (NCAA) met with representatives of more than 125 colleges and universities to determine whether or not to proceed with intercollegiate athletics during the war. Secretary of War Newton D. Baker addressed the gathering, opined that intercollegiate athletics were an effective means of training for military service, and recommended that efforts be undertaken to expand the number of persons receiving this training. The gathering then passed a resolution providing for the continuation of intercollegiate athletics with an emphasis on carrying out the recommendations of the Secretary of War.

As students enlisted in large numbers for military service, the enrollment of male students at the University of Michigan dropped by thirty percent (30%) in the fall of 1917. Several of Michigan veteran players (including Cedric "Pat" Smith, Philip Raymond, Willard Peach, John West, J. Vinton Hammels, and Frank Willard) were unavailable to the team due to military service. The losses left the team with only six players (Cliff Sparks, Tad Wieman, Richard Weske, Alan Boyd, Joseph Hanish, and John Orton Goodsell) who had ever played on the first team. With only one returning backfield player (Sparks), Yost converted tackle Tad Wieman into a fullback.

=== Week 1: Case ===
Week 1: Case at Michigan

Team	1	2	3	4	Total
Case	0	0	0	0	0
Michigan					0

- Date: October 6, 1917
- Location: Ferry Field
  Ann Arbor, MI
- Referee: James Durfee (Williams)

On October 6, 1917, Michigan played its annual game against the team from Case Scientific School in Cleveland. The game was the 21st meeting between the schools in a series dating back to 1894. In the 20 prior meetings, Michigan won 19 games and played to a tie once.

Michigan won the 1917 game by a 41–0 score. Tad Wieman, in his first game after being converted into a fullback, scored three touchdowns. Wieman also kicked five points after touchdown (PAT) for a total of 23 points in the game. Quarterback Cliff Sparks scored two touchdowns, and substitute right halfback Harold Rye also scored once. Case made only one first down.

The game was played in 12-1/2 minute quarters. Michigan's starting lineup against Case was Elmer Cress (left end), Frank Culver (left tackle), Alan Boyd (left guard), Charles Beath (center), John Orton Goodsell (right guard), Richard Weske (right tackle), Oscar Cartwright (right end), Cliff Sparks (quarterback), Joseph Hanish (left halfback), Abe Cohn (right halfback), and Tad Wieman (fullback). Substitutes appearing in the game for Michigan were Julius St. Clair (right end), Harold Rye (right halfback), Gerald Froemke (left halfback), Angus Goetz (right guard), Fred Hendershott (left end), Lowell Genebach (quarterback), William Fortune (right guard), and C. H. Graff (right tackle).

=== Week 2: Western State Normal ===
Week 2: Western State Normal at Michigan

Team	1	2	3	4	Total
Kalamazoo Normal	0	0	7	6	13
• Michigan	3	0	7	7	17

- Date: October 10, 1917
- Location: Ferry Field
  Ann Arbor, MI
- Referee: Walter S. Kennedy (Chicago)

On Wednesday, October 10, 1917, Michigan played the football team from the Western State Normal Normal School (also called Kalamazoo Normal and later renamed Western Michigan University). The game was the first game between the two schools, and the two programs met only one other time in the 20th century.

Michigan won the game by a score of 17 to 13. Michigan led 10–7 at the start of the fourth quarter, but Kalamazoo Normal scored a touchdown with four minutes remaining to take a 13–10 lead. On the following drive, halfback Harold Rye returned the kickoff 35 yards, and Abe Cohn then had a long run. Fullback Tad Wieman accounted for all of Michigan's points, scoring two touchdowns, kicking two points after touchdown, and one field goal from place kick. Michigan quarterback Cliff Sparks was injured in the game and did not start another game.

The game was played in quarters lasting 7-1/2, 7-1/2, 10 and 10 minutes. Michigan's starting lineup against Kalamazoo Normal was Angus Goetz (left end), Frank Culver (left tackle), Alan Boyd (left guard), John Orton Goodsell (center), William Fortune (right guard), Richard Weske (right tackle), Oscar Cartwright (right end), Cliff Sparks (quarterback), Abe Cohn (left halfback), Joseph Hanish (right halfback), and Tad Wieman (fullback). Substitutes appearing in the game for Michigan were Elmer Cress (left end), Rye (right halfback), St. Clair (right end), and Lowell Genebach (quarterback).

=== Week 3: Mount Union ===
Week 3: Mount Union at Michigan

Team	1	2	3	4	Total
Mount Union	0	0	0	0	0
• Michigan	7	28	28	6	69

- Date: October 13, 1917
- Location: Ferry Field
  Ann Arbor, MI
- Referee: Walter S. Kennedy (Chicago)

On Saturday, October 13, 1917, Michigan played the football team Mount Union College of Alliance, Ohio. The game was the fifth game between the two schools since 1913, with Michigan winning the prior games by a combined score of 102 to 7.

Michigan won the 1917 game by a score of 69 to 0. Left halfback Abe Cohn started the scoring with a touchdown run in the first quarter. Archie Weston came into the game as a substitute at quarterback at the start of the second quarter and scored five touchdowns, including a 65-yard touchdown run around the right end. Additional touchdowns were scored by Gerald Froemke, Tad Wieman, Thomas Garrett, and William Cruse. Wieman also kicked for eight points after touchdown (PAT), and Frank Culver added one PAT.

The game was played in 12-minute quarters. Michigan's starting lineup against Case was Angus Goetz (left end), Alan Boyd (left tackle), Julius St. Clair (left guard), Charles Beath (center), John Orton Goodsell (right guard), Richard Weske (right tackle), Oscar Cartwright (right end), Lowell Genebach (quarterback), Cohn (left halfback), Harold Rye (right halfback), and Wieman (fullback). Substitutes appearing in the game for Michigan were Weston (quarterback), Froemke (right halfback), Fred Hendershott (left end), William Fortune (right guard), Frank Culver (right guard), Thomas Garrett (fullback), Chester Morrison (right end), Elmer Cress (left end), William Cruse (left halfback), Arthur Weadock (right halfback), L. O. Lindstrom (left guard), and Harold Barnard (left tackle).

=== Week 4: Detroit ===
Week 4: Detroit at Michigan

Team	1	2	3	4	Total
Detroit	0	0	3	0	3
• Michigan	0	7	7	0	14

- Date: October 17, 1917
- Location: Ferry Field
  Ann Arbor, MI
- Referee: Holderness (Lehigh)

On Wednesday, October 17, 1917, Michigan played the football team University of Detroit. The game was the first and only football game ever played between the two schools. The Detroit team came into the game with a reputation for its powerful offense, having scored 145 the week before against the University of Toledo.

Michigan won the game by a score of 14 to 3. An interception led to a Michigan touchdown in the second quarter, and two forward passes led to another touchdown in the third quarter. Michigan's touchdowns were scored by Angus Goetz and Tad Wieman. Wieman also kicked two points after touchdown. Detroit scored on a dropkick field goal by halfback Allen. The game marked the Michigan debut of center Oscar Lambert who reportedly made fifty percent of Michigan's tackles.

The game was played in 10-minute quarters. Michigan's starting lineup against Detroit was Angus Goetz (left end), John Orton Goodsell (left tackle), Alan Boyd (left guard), Oscar Lambert (center), Frank Culver (right guard), Richard Weske (right tackle), Hanish (right end), Archie Weston (quarterback), Abe Cohn (left halfback), Froemke (right halfback), and Tad Wieman (fullback). Substitutes appearing in the game for Michigan were William Fortune (right guard), Oscar Cartwright (right end), L. O. Lindstrom (left tackle), Lowell Geneback (quarterback).

=== Week 5: Michigan Agricultural ===
Week 5: Michigan Agricultural at Michigan

Team	1	2	3	4	Total
Michigan Agricultural	0	0	0	0	0
• Michigan	6	0	7	14	27

- Date: October 20, 1917
- Location: Ferry Field
  Ann Arbor, MI

Michigan played its annual game against Michigan Agricultural College at Ferry Field on October 20, 1917. It was the 12th game between the two schools dating back to 1898. Michigan had won eight of the prior 11 games.

Michigan won the 1917 game by a score of 27 to 0. Michigan scored in the first quarter on a drive that featured a 30-yard run by Tad Wieman and was capped by a 15-yard touchdown run by Archie Weston. Wieman missed the kick for point after touchdown (PAT). At halftime, the schools' combined bands led a detachment of troops onto the field and played the "Star Spangled Banner" and "The Victors". In the third quarter, the Wolverines scoring drive began with a 20-yard punt return by Weston with Wieman scoring on a seven-yard run. Wieman then kicked the PAT to give the Wolverines a 13–0 lead. In the fourth quarter, Wieman ran through the middle of the M.A.C. line, "shook off five tacklers," and scored on a 35-yard touchdown run. Wieman added the PAT. Later in the fourth quarter, Weston ran 30 yards around the left end to the M.A.C. 12-yard line, and Wieman scored his third touchdown of the afternoon on a one-yard run. Wieman then kicked his third PAT for 21 points in the game.

Michigan's starting lineup against M.A.C. included Goetz (left end), Goodsell (left tackle), Boyd (left guard), Oscar Lambert (center), Frank Culver (right guard), Weske (right tackle), Cartwright (right end), Archie Weston (quarterback), Abe Cohn (left halfback), Genebach (right halfback), and Tad Wieman (fullback). Substitutes appearing in the game for Michigan were Rye (right halfback), Cruse (left halfback), Hanish (left halfback), Froemke (left halfback), William Fortune (right guard), Barnard (right halfback), Cress, Hendershott, Weadock, Wellford, Garrett, and St. Clair.

=== Week 6: Nebraska ===
Week 6: Nebraska at Michigan

Team	1	2	3	4	Total
Nebraska	0	0	0	0	0
• Michigan	7	7	3	3	20

- Date: October 27, 1917
- Location: Ferry Field
  Ann Arbor, MI
- Referee: Snyder (Harvard)

On October 27, 1917, Michigan played the football team from the University of Nebraska. The game was the first between the two schools. The 1918 Michiganensian described the field conditions this way: "The heavy field, soaked by a week's rain, hampered the Nebraska boys while the Michiganders seemed to revel in the goo."

Michigan won by a score of 20 to 0. Michigan's two touchdowns were scored by left halfback Gerald Froemke and fullback Tad Wieman. Wieman scored 14 of Michigan's 20 points, kicking two points after touchdown and two field goals in addition to his touchdown. Froemke's touchdown came in the first quarter when he recovered a fumble at Nebraska's 10-yard line and, behind the blocking of Wieman and Archie Weston, returned the ball 90 yards for a touchdown.

The game was played in 15-minute quarters. Michigan's starting lineup against Nebraska was Angus Goetz (left end), John Orton Goodsell (left tackle), Frank Culver (left guard), Oscar Lambert (center), William Fortune (right guard), Richard Weske (right tackle), Boyd (right end), Archie Weston (quarterback), Froemke (left halfback), Joseph Hanish (right halfback), and Wieman (fullback). Substitutes appearing in the game for Michigan were William Cruse (left halfback), Harold Rye (left halfback), Lowell Genebach (left halfback), Lee Bonar (left end) and Chester Morrison (right guard).

=== Week 7: Kalamazoo ===
Week 7: Kalamazoo at Michigan

Team	1	2	3	4	Total
Kalamazoo	0	0	0	0	0
• Michigan	14	21	13	14	62

- Date: November 3, 1917
- Location: Ferry Field
  Ann Arbor, MI
- Referee: Snyder (Harvard)

On November 3, 1917, Michigan played the football team from Kalamazoo College. The game was the fifth between the two schools dating back to 1899. Michigan had won the four previous games by a combined score of 177 to 0.

Michigan won the 1917 game by a score of 62 to 0. Quarterback Archie Weston gained over 300 yards, including runs of 60 yards, 35 yards and two for 25 yards. Weston also scored four touchdowns in the game. Tad Wieman and William Cruse scored two touchdowns each, and a ninth touchdown was scored by Gerald Froemke. Wieman also kicked for eight points after touchdown.

The game was played in 15-minute quarters. Michigan's starting lineup against Kalamazoo was Angus Goetz (left end), John Orton Goodsell (left tackle), Frank Culver (left guard), Oscar Lambert (center), William Fortune (right guard), Richard Weske (right tackle), Oscar Cartwright (right end), Archie Weston (quarterback), Gerald Froemke (left halfback), Joseph Hanish (right halfback), and Tad Wieman (fullback). Substitutes appearing in the game for Michigan were Lowell Genebach (right halfback), Lee Bonar (left end), William Cruse (left halfback), Alan Boyd (right end), Chester Morrison (right tackle), and Thomas Garrett (center).

=== Week 8: Cornell ===
Week 8: Cornell at Michigan

Team	1	2	3	4	Total
Cornell	0	0	0	0	0
• Michigan	14	21	13	14	62

- Date: November 10, 1917
- Location: Ferry Field
  Ann Arbor, MI
- Referee: Walter Eckersall (Chicago)

On November 3, 1917, Michigan played the football team from Cornell University. The game was the 15th meeting of the teams dating back to 1889. Michigan had won only three of the prior 14 meetings.

Michigan won the 1917 game by a score of 42 to 0. Michigan quarterback Archie Weston scored three touchdowns. Additional touchdowns were scored by Cliff Sparks, Joseph Hanish, and Abe Cohn. Tad Wieman was successful on all six kicks for point after touchdown.

The game was played in 15-minute quarters. Michigan's starting lineup against Cornell was Angus Goetz (left end), John Orton Goodsell (left tackle), Frank Culver (left guard), Oscar Lambert (center), William Fortune (right guard), Richard Weske (right tackle), Alan Boyd (right end), Archie Weston (quarterback), Cliff Sparks (left halfback), Joseph Hanish (right halfback), and Tad Wieman (fullback).

=== Week 9: at Penn ===
Week 9: Michigan at Penn

Team	1	2	Total
Michigan			0
Penn			0

- Date: November 17, 1917
- Location: Franklin Field
  Philadelphia, PA
- Referee: Tufts (Brown)

On November 17, 1917, Michigan played its annual rivalry game against the Penn Quakers football team. The game was the 13th meeting between the teams dating back to 1899. After leaving the Big Ten Conference, Penn became Michigan's regular season-ending rivalry game. In the 12 prior meetings, Michigan had won only four times, with the two teams playing to a scoreless tie in 1915.

Michigan lost the 1917 game by a score of 16 to 0. Michigan and Penn played "almost even" in the first quarter with Penn gaining 53 yards from scrimmage to 45 for Michigan. However, at the start of the second quarter, Michigan's quarterback Archie Weston was ejected from the game after a fight with two Penn players, Miller and Strauss. After Weston was ejected, Penn dominated the game, limiting Michigan to only seven yards from scrimmage in the entire second half. Penn's scoring came on a touchdown by Cleary and three field goals and a point after touchdown by Howard Berry.

The game was played in 15-minute quarters. Michigan's starting lineup against Northwestern was Angus Goetz (left end), Goodsell (left tackle), Frank Culver (left guard), Oscar Lambert (center), William Fortune (right guard), Richard Weske (right tackle), Boyd (right end), Archie Weston (quarterback), Abe Cohn (left halfback), Joseph Hanish (right halfback), and Tad Wieman (fullback).

=== Week 10: at Northwestern ===
Week 10: Michigan at Northwestern

Team	1	2	3	4	Total
Michigan	6	0	0	6	12
• Northwestern	7	7	7	0	21

- Date: November 24, 1917
- Location: Northwestern Field
  Evanston, IL
- Referee: Holderness (Lehigh)

On November 24, 1917, Michigan played the football team from Northwestern University. The game was the 15th meeting of the teams dating back to 1889. Michigan had won only three of the prior 14 meetings. The game represented Michigan's first game against a conference opponent after rejoining the Big Ten Conference. Before the game started, the Northwestern crowd greeted the Wolverines warmly, and Walter Eckersall in the Chicago Tribune wrote: "That Michigan is welcomed in its return to the conference goes without saying."

Michigan played the game with three of its key starters, quarterback Archie Weston, center Oscar Lambert, and guard Frank Culver) sidelined by injury.

Michigan lost the 1917 game by a score of 21 to 12. Northwestern scored first on a forward pass from Ellingwood to Arrles. Michigan responded with a scoring drive capped by a three-year run by Gerald Froemke, but Tad Wieman missed the point after touchdown (PAT), and Northwestern remained in the lead, 7–6. Northwestern scored again, on a short run by Koehler, and extended its lead to 14–6 at halftime. Northwestern scored again in the third period and led 21–6. In the fourth quarter, Froemke returned a punt 50 yards. Michigan scored a touchdown to reduce Northwestern's lead to 21–12, though accounts differ as to whether the second Michigan touchdown was scored by Froemke or Wieman.

The game was played in 15-minute quarters. Michigan's starting lineup against Northwestern was Angus Goetz (left end), Wieman (left tackle), Alan Boyd (left guard), Goodsell (center), Morrison (right guard), Richard Weske (right tackle), Cartwright (right end), Froemke (quarterback), Rye (left halfback), Joseph Hanish (right halfback), and Abe Cohn (fullback). Substitutions for Michigan were Cliff Sparks (left halfback), William Fortune (right guard), and Morrison (left tackle).

== Players ==
=== Varsity letter winners ===
For their participation on the 1917 football team, 18 players were awarded a varsity letter "M". Those 18 players are:

- Alan Boyd, Indianapolis, Indiana - started 5 games at left guard, 3 games at right end, 1 game at left tackle
- Oscar Cartwright, Detroit, Michigan - started 6 games at right end
- Abe Cohn, Portland, Oregon - started 5 games at left halfback, 2 games at fullback, 1 game at right halfback
- William R. Cruse, Detroit, Michigan - halfback
- Frank Culver, Detroit, Michigan - started 4 games at left guard, 3 games at left tackle, 1 game at right guard
- William Fortune, Springfield, Illinois - started 5 games at right guard
- Gerald Froemke, Sheldon, North Dakota - started 3 games at left halfback, 1 game at quarterback
- Lowell Genebach, Battle Creek, Michigan - started 1 game at quarterback, 1 game at right halfback
- Angus Goetz, De Tour Village, Michigan - started 9 games at left end
- John Orton Goodsell, Saginaw, Michigan - started 5 games at left tackle, 3 games at right guard, 2 games at center
- Joseph Hanish, Grand Rapids, Michigan - started 7 games at right halfback, 1 game at right end
- Oscar Lambert, Pennsboro, West Virginia - started 6 games at center
- Chester C. Morrison, Pittsburgh, Pennsylvania - started 1 game at right guard
- Harold Rye, Sault Ste. Marie, Michigan - started 1 game at left halfback, 1 game at right halfback
- Cliff Sparks, Jackson, Michigan - started 2 games at quarterback, 1 game at left halfback
- Richard F. "Dick" Weske, New London, Connecticut - started 10 games at right tackle
- Archie Weston, Sault Ste. Marie, Michigan - started 6 games at quarterback
- Tad Wieman, Los Angeles, California - started 8 games at fullback, 1 game at left tackle

=== aMa letter winners ===
- Charles Beath, Escanaba, Michigan - started 2 games at center
- Lee Bonar, Belleville, West Virginia - end
- Harold M. Cherry, Buffalo, New York - center
- John H. Emery, Bedford, Indiana - end
- Thomas C. Garrett, Lakewood, Ohio - fullback
- Fred Hendershott, Tecumseh, Michigan - end
- L.O. Lindstrom, Marquette, Michigan - guard

=== Others ===
- Elmer Cress, Grand Rapids, Michigan - started 1 game at left end (designated as reserve)
- C. H. Graff, reserve
- John Perrin, reserve
- Julius St. Clair, Duluth, Minnesota - started 1 game at left guard
- Arthur Weadock, reserve

=== Scoring leaders ===
Player	Touchdowns	Extra points	Field goals	Total Points
Tad Wieman	14	36	3	129
Archie Weston	13	0	0	78
Gerald Froemke	4	0	0	24
Cliff Sparks	3	0	0	18
William Cruse	3	0	0	18
Abe Cohn	2	0	0	12
Angus Goetz	1	0	0	6
Joseph Hanish	1	0	0	6
Harold Rye	1	0	0	6
Thomas Garrett	1	0	0	6
Frank Culver	0	1	0	1
Totals	43	37	3	304

=== Awards and honors ===
- Captain: Cedric C. Smith
- All-Americans: Ernest Allmendinger, Cedric C. Smith, Frank Culver
- All-Conference: Ernie Vick, Angus Goetz

== Coaching staff ==
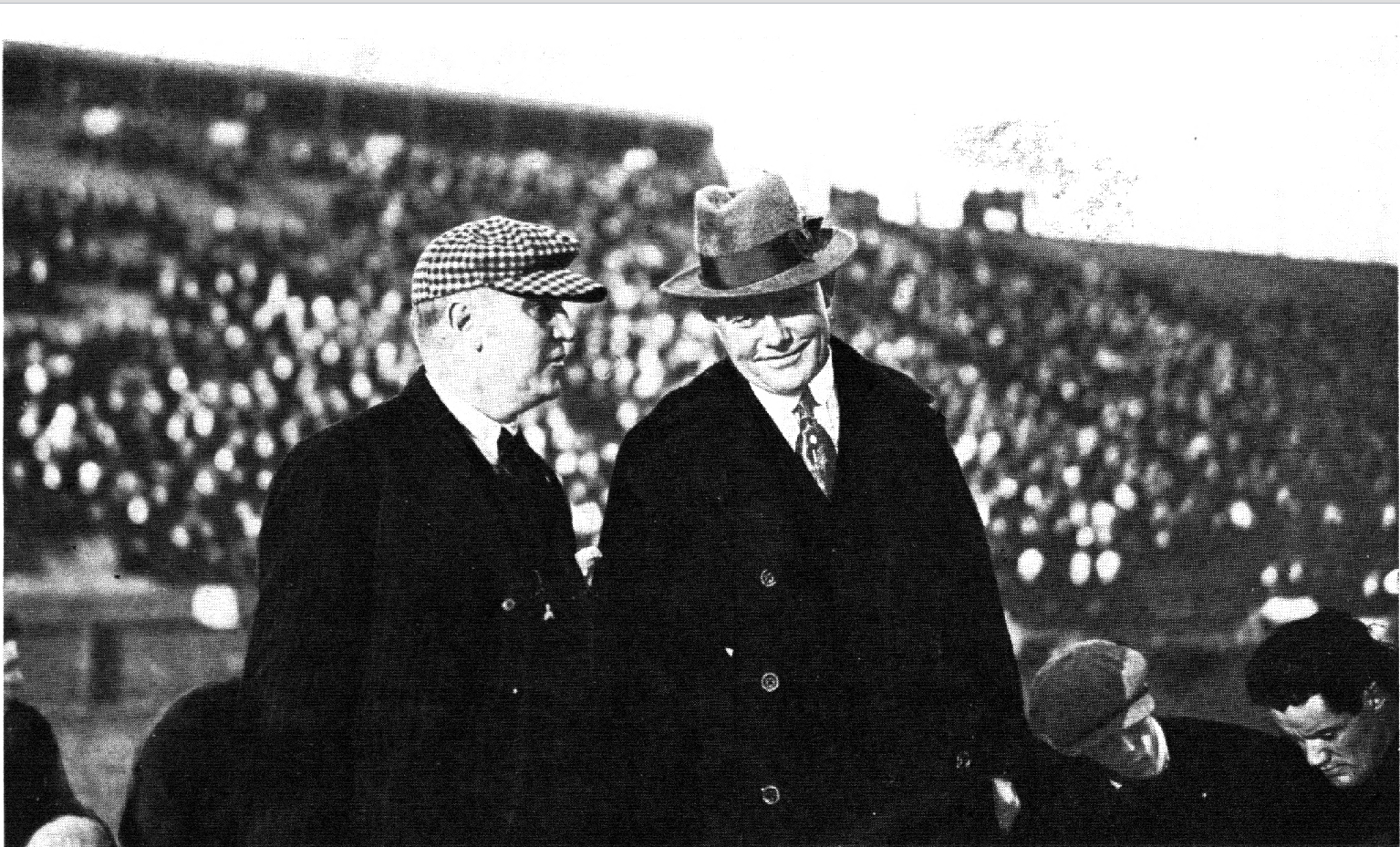
Trainer Harry Tuthill and Yost

- Head coach: Fielding H. Yost
- Assistant coaches: Prentiss Douglass, Robert Watson
- Trainer: Harry Tuthill
- Manager: Charles F. Boos
