= 1917 South Dakota Coyotes football team =

American college football season

1917 South Dakota Coyotes football
- Conference: Independent
- Record: 2–3
- Head coach: Blaine McKusick (2nd season)

1917 Midwestern college football independents records
	Conf.			Overall
Team	W	L	T	W		L		T
Marquette		–		8	–	0	–	1
Detroit		–		8	–	1	–	0
Morningside		–		5	–	1	–	0
Notre Dame		–		6	–	1	–	1
Heidelberg		–		5	–	1	–	1
St. Mary's (OH)		–		7	–	2	–	0
St. Xavier		–		4	–	1	–	2
North Dakota Agricultural		–		4	–	2	–	0
Akron		–		5	–	3	–	0
Haskell		–		6	–	5	–	0
Western State Normal		–		4	–	3	–	0
Saint Louis		–		4	–	3	–	1
Michigan State Normal		–		3	–	4	–	0
Iowa State Teachers		–		2	–	3	–	0
South Dakota		–		2	–	3	–	0
Central Michigan		–		1	–	2	–	0
Lake Forest		–		2	–	5	–	0
Wabash		–		1	–	6	–	1
Toledo		–		0	–	3	–	0
Michigan Agricultural		–		0	–	9	–	0

The 1917 South Dakota Coyotes football team represented the University of South Dakota during the 1917 college football season.

== Schedule ==
Date	Opponent	Site	Result	Source
October 13	North Dakota	Vermillion, SD (rivalry)	W 19–0	
October 20	at Creighton	Omaha, NE	W 7–0	
October 27	at Notre Dame	Cartier Field; South Bend, IN	L 0–40 or 0–44	
November 10	at Iowa	Iowa City, IA	L 0–35	
November 29	at Morningside	Sioux City, IA	L 7–14	
