= 1917 Ohio Green and White football team =

American college football season

1917 Ohio Green and White football
- Conference: Ohio Athletic Conference
- Record: 3–5 (3–3 OAC)
- Head coach: M. B. Banks (5th season)

1917 Ohio Athletic Conference football standings
	Conf.					Overall
Team	W		L		T	W		L		T
Miami (OH) $	5	–	0	–	1	6	–	0	–	2
Wooster	5	–	0	–	3	6	–	0	–	3
Wittenberg	4	–	1	–	0	5	–	2	–	0
Oberlin	4	–	1	–	0	5	–	2	–	1
Akron	3	–	1	–	0	5	–	3	–	0
Denison	2	–	2	–	0	5	–	3	–	0
Ohio Wesleyan	3	–	3	–	1	4	–	3	–	1
Western Reserve	3	–	3	–	1	3	–	5	–	1
Ohio	3	–	3	–	0	3	–	5	–	0
Case	3	–	4	–	1	3	–	6	–	1
Kenyon	2	–	3	–	1	3	–	3	–	1
Mount Union	1	–	5	–	0	2	–	6	–	0
Ohio Northern	0	–	4	–	0	3	–	4	–	0
Baldwin–Wallace	0	–	7	–	0	1	–	8	–	0
Cincinnati	0	–	4	–	0	0	–	6	–	0
Ohio State *	3	–	0	–	0	8	–	0	–	1
$ – Conference champion; * – did not complete for championship

The 1917 Ohio Green and White football team represented Ohio University as a member of the Ohio Athletic Conference (OAC) during the 1917 college football season. Led by fifth-year head coach M. B. Banks, the Green and White compiled an overall record of 3–5 with a mark of 3–3 in conference play, tying for sixth place in the OAC.

== Schedule ==
Date	Time	Opponent	Site	Result	Source
September 29		Ohio Wesleyan	Athens, OH	L 0–14	
October 13		at Wooster	Wooster, OH	L 0–20	
October 20	3:00 p.m.	at Carnegie Tech*	Tech Field; Pittsburgh, PA	L 0–21	
October 27		at Cincinnati	Carson Field; Cincinnati, OH	W 22–0	
November 3		Baldwin–Wallace	Athens, OH	W 43–0	
November 10		Kenyon	Athens, OH	W 20–0	
November 17		at Oberlin	Oberlin, OH	L 0–46	
November 29		at Marietta*	Marietta, OH	L 0–6	
*Non-conference game
