= 1917 Cincinnati Bearcats football team =

American college football season

1917 Cincinnati Bearcats football
- Conference: Ohio Athletic Conference
- Record: 0–6 (0–4 OAC)
- Head coach: Frank Marty (1st season)
- Captain: Harold Talcott
- Home stadium: Carson Field

1917 Ohio Athletic Conference football standings
	Conf.					Overall
Team	W		L		T	W		L		T
Miami (OH) $	5	–	0	–	1	6	–	0	–	2
Wooster	5	–	0	–	3	6	–	0	–	3
Wittenberg	4	–	1	–	0	5	–	2	–	0
Oberlin	4	–	1	–	0	5	–	2	–	1
Akron	3	–	1	–	0	5	–	3	–	0
Denison	2	–	2	–	0	5	–	3	–	0
Ohio Wesleyan	3	–	3	–	1	4	–	3	–	1
Western Reserve	3	–	3	–	1	3	–	5	–	1
Ohio	3	–	3	–	0	3	–	5	–	0
Case	3	–	4	–	1	3	–	6	–	1
Kenyon	2	–	3	–	1	3	–	3	–	1
Mount Union	1	–	5	–	0	2	–	6	–	0
Ohio Northern	0	–	4	–	0	3	–	4	–	0
Baldwin–Wallace	0	–	7	–	0	1	–	8	–	0
Cincinnati	0	–	4	–	0	0	–	6	–	0
Ohio State *	3	–	0	–	0	8	–	0	–	1
$ – Conference champion; * – did not complete for championship

The 1917 Cincinnati Bearcats football team was an American football team that represented the University of Cincinnati as a member of the Ohio Athletic Conference during the 1917 college football season. In their first season under head coach Frank Marty, the Bearcats compiled a 0–6 record (0–4 against conference opponents). Harold Talcott was the team captain. The team played its home games at Carson Field in Cincinnati.

== Schedule ==
Date	Opponent	Site	Result
October 6	Earlham*	Carson Field; Cincinnati, OH	L 0–19
October 13	Wittenberg	Carson Field; Cincinnati, OH	L 0–7
October 20	at Marietta*	Marietta, OH	L 0–53
October 27	Ohio	Carson Field; Cincinnati, OH	L 0–22
November 3	at Ohio Wesleyan	Delaware, OH	L 0–48
November 29	Miami (OH)	Carson Field; Cincinnati, OH (Victory Bell)	L 0–40
*Non-conference game
