= William Fortune =

American football player (1897–1947)

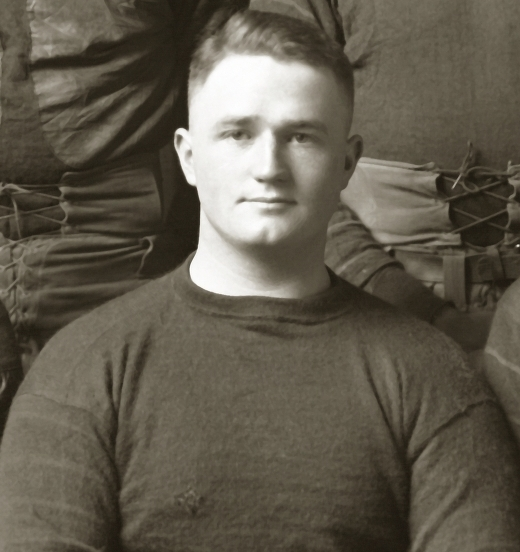

Profile
- Positions: Guard, tackle

Personal information
- Born: October 14, 1897; Joliet, Illinois, U.S.
- Died: March 12, 1947 (aged 49); Chicago, Illinois, U.S.

Career information
- College: Michigan

Career history
- 1917–1919: Michigan
- 1920: Chicago Cardinals
- 1924–1925: Hammond Pros

Awards and highlights
- National champion (1918)

William Peter Fortune (October 14, 1897 – March 12, 1947) was an American football player. He played guard and tackle for the Michigan Wolverines football team from 1917 to 1919. He was a member of the 1918 Michigan Wolverines football team that finished the season undefeated and has been recognized as the national championship team of 1918. He later played professional football for the Chicago Cardinals in 1920 and the Hammond Pros from 1924 to 1925.

== See also ==
- 1917 Michigan Wolverines football team
- 1918 Michigan Wolverines football team
- 1919 Michigan Wolverines football team
