= 1917 Wisconsin Badgers football team =

American college football season

1917 Wisconsin Badgers football
- Conference: Big Ten Conference
- Record: 4–2–1 (3–2 Big Ten)
- Head coach: John R. Richards (2nd season)
- Captain: Howard Hancock
- Home stadium: Camp Randall Stadium

1917 Big Ten Conference football standings
	Conf.					Overall
Team	W		L		T	W		L		T
Ohio State $	4	–	0	–	0	8	–	0	–	1
Minnesota	3	–	1	–	0	4	–	1	–	0
Northwestern	3	–	2	–	0	5	–	2	–	0
Wisconsin	3	–	2	–	0	4	–	2	–	1
Illinois	2	–	2	–	1	5	–	2	–	1
Chicago	2	–	2	–	1	3	–	2	–	1
Indiana	1	–	2	–	0	5	–	2	–	0
Michigan	0	–	1	–	0	8	–	2	–	0
Iowa	0	–	2	–	0	3	–	5	–	0
Purdue	0	–	4	–	0	3	–	4	–	0
$ – Conference champion

The 1917 Wisconsin Badgers football team represented the University of Wisconsin as a member of the Big Ten Conference during the 1917 college football season. Led by John R. Richards, who returned for his second season as head coach after helming the team in 1911, the Badgers compiled an overall record of 4–2–1 with a mark of 3–2 in conference play, tying for third place in the Western Conference. The team's captain was Howard Hancock.

== Schedule ==
Date	Opponent	Site	Result	Attendance	Source
October 6	Beloit*	Camp Randall Stadium; Madison, WI	W 34–0		
October 13	Notre Dame*	Camp Randall Stadium; Madison, WI	T 0–0		
October 20	at Illinois	Illinois Field; Champaign, IL	L 0–7		
October 27	Iowa	Camp Randall Stadium; Madison, WI (rivalry)	W 20–0		
November 3	Minnesota^{†}	Camp Randall Stadium; Madison, WI (rivalry)	W 10–7	12,000	
November 10	Ohio State	Camp Randall Stadium; Madison, WI	L 3–16		
November 24	at Chicago	Stagg Field; Chicago, IL	W 18–0		
*Non-conference game; ^{†}Homecoming
