= 1917 Indiana Hoosiers football team =

American college football season

1917 Indiana Hoosiers football
- Conference: Big Ten Conference
- Record: 5–2 (1–2 Western)
- Head coach: Ewald O. Stiehm (2nd season)
- Captain: Russell Hathaway
- Home stadium: Jordan Field

1917 Big Ten Conference football standings
	Conf.					Overall
Team	W		L		T	W		L		T
Ohio State $	4	–	0	–	0	8	–	0	–	1
Minnesota	3	–	1	–	0	4	–	1	–	0
Northwestern	3	–	2	–	0	5	–	2	–	0
Wisconsin	3	–	2	–	0	4	–	2	–	1
Illinois	2	–	2	–	1	5	–	2	–	1
Chicago	2	–	2	–	1	3	–	2	–	1
Indiana	1	–	2	–	0	5	–	2	–	0
Michigan	0	–	1	–	0	8	–	2	–	0
Iowa	0	–	2	–	0	3	–	5	–	0
Purdue	0	–	4	–	0	3	–	4	–	0
$ – Conference champion

The 1917 Indiana Hoosiers football team was an American football team that represented Indiana University Bloomington during the 1917 college football season. In their second season under head coach Ewald O. Stiehm, the Hoosiers compiled a 5–2 record and finished in seventh place in the Big Ten Conference. They won games against Franklin (50–0), Wabash (51–0), Saint Louis (40–0), DePauw (35–0), and Purdue (37–0), and lost to Minnesota (33–9), and Ohio State (26–3).

== Schedule ==
Date	Opponent	Site	Result	Source
September 29	Franklin (IN)*	Jordan Field; Bloomington, IN	W 50–0	
October 6	Wabash*	Jordan Field; Bloomington, IN	W 51–0	
October 13	Saint Louis*	Jordan Field; Bloomington, IN	W 40–0	
October 27	at Minnesota	Northrop Field; Minneapolis, MN	L 9–33	
November 3	vs. Ohio State	Washington Park; Indianapolis, IN	L 3–26	
November 10	DePauw	Jordan Field; Bloomington, IN	W 35–0	
November 24	at Purdue	Stuart Field; West Lafayette, IN (rivalry)	W 37–0	
*Non-conference game
