= 1917 Iowa Hawkeyes football team =

American college football season

1917 Iowa Hawkeyes football
- Conference: Big Ten Conference
- Record: 3–5 (0–2 Big Ten)
- Head coach: Howard Jones (2nd season)
- Offensive scheme: Single-wing
- Captain: J. Elwood Davis
- Home stadium: Iowa Field

Uniform
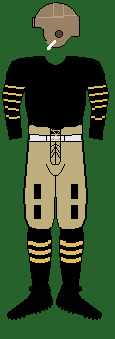

1917 Big Ten Conference football standings
	Conf.					Overall
Team	W		L		T	W		L		T
Ohio State $	4	–	0	–	0	8	–	0	–	1
Minnesota	3	–	1	–	0	4	–	1	–	0
Northwestern	3	–	2	–	0	5	–	2	–	0
Wisconsin	3	–	2	–	0	4	–	2	–	1
Illinois	2	–	2	–	1	5	–	2	–	1
Chicago	2	–	2	–	1	3	–	2	–	1
Indiana	1	–	2	–	0	5	–	2	–	0
Michigan	0	–	1	–	0	8	–	2	–	0
Iowa	0	–	2	–	0	3	–	5	–	0
Purdue	0	–	4	–	0	3	–	4	–	0
$ – Conference champion

The 1917 Iowa Hawkeyes football team was an American football team that represented the University of Iowa as a member of the Big Ten Conference during the 1917 college football season. In their second year under head coach Howard Jones, the Hawkeyes compiled a 3–5 record (0–2 in conference games), finished in ninth place in the Big Ten, and were outscored by a total of 141 to 91.

The team played its home games at Iowa Field in Iowa City, Iowa.

== Schedule ==
Date	Opponent	Site	Result
October 6	Cornell (IA)*	Iowa Field; Iowa City, IA	W 22–13
October 13	Nebraska*	Nebraska Field; Lincoln, NE (rivalry)	L 0–47
October 20	Grinnell*	Iowa Field; Iowa City, IA	L 0–10
October 27	at Wisconsin	Camp Randall Stadium; Madison, WI (rivalry)	L 0–20
November 3	Great Lakes Navy*	Iowa Field; Iowa City, IA	L 14–23
November 10	South Dakota*	Iowa Field; Iowa City, IA	W 35–0
November 17	at Northwestern	Northwestern Field; Evanston, IL	L 14–25
November 24	Iowa State*^{†}	Iowa Field; Iowa City, IA (rivalry)	W 6–3
*Non-conference game; ^{†}Homecoming
