= 1917 Northwestern Purple football team =

American college football season

1917 Northwestern Purple football
- Conference: Big Ten Conference
- Record: 5–2 (3–2 Big Ten)
- Head coach: Fred J. Murphy (4th season)
- Captain: Robert Randolph
- Home stadium: Northwestern Field

1917 Big Ten Conference football standings
	Conf.					Overall
Team	W		L		T	W		L		T
Ohio State $	4	–	0	–	0	8	–	0	–	1
Minnesota	3	–	1	–	0	4	–	1	–	0
Northwestern	3	–	2	–	0	5	–	2	–	0
Wisconsin	3	–	2	–	0	4	–	2	–	1
Illinois	2	–	2	–	1	5	–	2	–	1
Chicago	2	–	2	–	1	3	–	2	–	1
Indiana	1	–	2	–	0	5	–	2	–	0
Michigan	0	–	1	–	0	8	–	2	–	0
Iowa	0	–	2	–	0	3	–	5	–	0
Purdue	0	–	4	–	0	3	–	4	–	0
$ – Conference champion

The 1917 Northwestern Purple team represented Northwestern University during the 1917 college football season. In their fourth year under head coach Fred J. Murphy, the Purple compiled a 5–2 record (3–2 against Big Ten Conference opponents) and finished in a tie for third place in the Big Ten Conference.

== Schedule ==
Date	Opponent	Site	Result	Attendance	Source
October 6	Lake Forest*	Northwestern Field; Evanston, IL	W 48–0		
October 13	at Ohio State	Ohio Field; Columbus, OH	L 0–40		
October 27	Chicago	Northwestern Field; Evanston, IL	L 0–7	12,000	
November 3	at Purdue	Stuart Field; West Lafayette, IN	W 12–6		
November 10	Michigan Agricultural*	Northwestern Field; Evanston, IL	W 39–6		
November 17	Iowa	Northwestern Field; Evanston, IL	W 25–14		
November 24	Michigan	Northwestern Field; Evanston, IL (rivalry)	W 21–12	5,232	
*Non-conference game
