= 1917 Chicago Maroons football team =

American college football season

1917 Chicago Maroons football
- Conference: Big Ten Conference
- Record: 3–2–1 (2–2–1 Big Ten)
- Head coach: Amos Alonzo Stagg (26th season)
- Home stadium: Stagg Field

1917 Big Ten Conference football standings
	Conf.					Overall
Team	W		L		T	W		L		T
Ohio State $	4	–	0	–	0	8	–	0	–	1
Minnesota	3	–	1	–	0	4	–	1	–	0
Northwestern	3	–	2	–	0	5	–	2	–	0
Wisconsin	3	–	2	–	0	4	–	2	–	1
Illinois	2	–	2	–	1	5	–	2	–	1
Chicago	2	–	2	–	1	3	–	2	–	1
Indiana	1	–	2	–	0	5	–	2	–	0
Michigan	0	–	1	–	0	8	–	2	–	0
Iowa	0	–	2	–	0	3	–	5	–	0
Purdue	0	–	4	–	0	3	–	4	–	0
$ – Conference champion

The 1917 Chicago Maroons football team was an American football team that represented the University of Chicago during the 1917 college football season. In their 26th season under head coach Amos Alonzo Stagg, the Maroons compiled a 3–2–1 record, finished in sixth place in the Big Ten Conference, and outscored their opponents by a combined total of 82 to 51.

== Schedule ==
Date	Opponent	Site	Result	Attendance	Source
October 13	Vanderbilt*	Stagg Field; Chicago, IL	W 48–0		
October 20	Purdue	Stagg Field; Chicago, IL(rivalry)	W 27–0		
October 27	Northwestern	Stagg Field; Chicago, IL	W 7–0	12,000	
November 3	Illinois	Stagg Field; Chicago, IL	T 0–0	20,000	
November 17	at Minnesota	Northrop Field; Minneapolis, MN	L 0–33	16,000	
November 24	Wisconsin	Stagg Field; Chicago, IL	L 0–18		
*Non-conference game
