= 1917 Illinois Fighting Illini football team =

American college football season

1917 Illinois Fighting Illini football
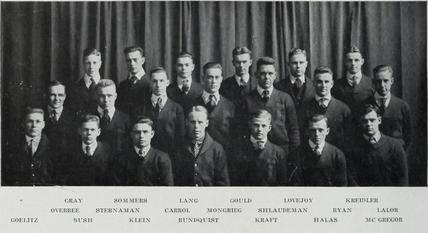
- Conference: Big Ten Conference
- Record: 5–2–1 (2–2–1 Big Ten)
- Head coach: Robert Zuppke (5th season)
- Offensive scheme: I formation
- Captain: Reynold R. Kraft
- Home stadium: Illinois Field

1917 Big Ten Conference football standings
	Conf.					Overall
Team	W		L		T	W		L		T
Ohio State $	4	–	0	–	0	8	–	0	–	1
Minnesota	3	–	1	–	0	4	–	1	–	0
Northwestern	3	–	2	–	0	5	–	2	–	0
Wisconsin	3	–	2	–	0	4	–	2	–	1
Illinois	2	–	2	–	1	5	–	2	–	1
Chicago	2	–	2	–	1	3	–	2	–	1
Indiana	1	–	2	–	0	5	–	2	–	0
Michigan	0	–	1	–	0	8	–	2	–	0
Iowa	0	–	2	–	0	3	–	5	–	0
Purdue	0	–	4	–	0	3	–	4	–	0
$ – Conference champion

The 1917 Illinois Fighting Illini football team was an American football team that represented the University of Illinois during the 1917 college football season. In their fifth season under head coach Robert Zuppke, the Illini compiled a 5–2–1 record and finished in a tie for fifth place in the Big Ten Conference. This team included Chicago Bears founder and coach, George Halas. End Reynold R. Kraft was the team captain.

== Schedule ==
Date	Opponent	Site	Result	Attendance	Source
October 6	Kansas*	Illinois Field; Champaign, IL	W 22–0		
October 13	Oklahoma*	Illinois Field; Champaign, IL	W 44–0		
October 20	Wisconsin	Illinois Field; Champaign, IL	W 7–0		
October 27	Purdue	Illinois Field; Champaign, IL (rivalry)	W 27–0		
November 3	at Chicago	Stagg Field; Chicago, IL	T 0–0	20,000	
November 17	at Ohio State	Ohio Field; Columbus, OH (rivalry)	L 0–13		
November 24	Minnesota	Illinois Field; Champaign, IL	L 6–27	4,500	
November 29	at Camp Funston*	Fort Riley, KS	W 28–0		
*Non-conference game
