= 1917 Ohio State Buckeyes football team =

American college football season

1917 Ohio State Buckeyes football

Big Ten champion
- Conference: Big Ten Conference, Ohio Athletic Conference
- Record: 8–0–1 (4–0 Big Ten, 3–0 OAC)
- Head coach: John Wilce (5th season)
- Home stadium: Ohio Field

1917 Big Ten Conference football standings
	Conf.					Overall
Team	W		L		T	W		L		T
Ohio State $	4	–	0	–	0	8	–	0	–	1
Minnesota	3	–	1	–	0	4	–	1	–	0
Northwestern	3	–	2	–	0	5	–	2	–	0
Wisconsin	3	–	2	–	0	4	–	2	–	1
Illinois	2	–	2	–	1	5	–	2	–	1
Chicago	2	–	2	–	1	3	–	2	–	1
Indiana	1	–	2	–	0	5	–	2	–	0
Michigan	0	–	1	–	0	8	–	2	–	0
Iowa	0	–	2	–	0	3	–	5	–	0
Purdue	0	–	4	–	0	3	–	4	–	0
$ – Conference champion

1917 Ohio Athletic Conference football standings
	Conf.					Overall
Team	W		L		T	W		L		T
Miami (OH) $	5	–	0	–	1	6	–	0	–	2
Wooster	5	–	0	–	3	6	–	0	–	3
Wittenberg	4	–	1	–	0	5	–	2	–	0
Oberlin	4	–	1	–	0	5	–	2	–	1
Akron	3	–	1	–	0	5	–	3	–	0
Denison	2	–	2	–	0	5	–	3	–	0
Ohio Wesleyan	3	–	3	–	1	4	–	3	–	1
Western Reserve	3	–	3	–	1	3	–	5	–	1
Ohio	3	–	3	–	0	3	–	5	–	0
Case	3	–	4	–	1	3	–	6	–	1
Kenyon	2	–	3	–	1	3	–	3	–	1
Mount Union	1	–	5	–	0	2	–	6	–	0
Ohio Northern	0	–	4	–	0	3	–	4	–	0
Baldwin–Wallace	0	–	7	–	0	1	–	8	–	0
Cincinnati	0	–	4	–	0	0	–	6	–	0
Ohio State *	3	–	0	–	0	8	–	0	–	1
$ – Conference champion; * – did not complete for championship

The 1917 Ohio State Buckeyes football team represented Ohio State University as a member of the Big Ten Conference and the Ohio Athletic Conference (OAC) during the 1917 college football season. Led by fifth-year head coach, John Wilce, the Buckeyes compiled an overall record of 8–0–1 and outscored opponents 292–6. Ohio State had a record of 4–0 against Big Ten opponents, winning the conference title for the second consecutive season.

== Schedule ==
Date	Opponent	Site	Result	Attendance	Source
September 29	Case	Ohio Field; Columbus, OH	W 49–0		
October 6	Ohio Wesleyan	Ohio Field; Columbus, OH	W 53–0		
October 13	Northwestern	Ohio Field; Columbus, OH	W 40–0		
October 27	Denison	Ohio Field; Columbus, OH	W 67–0		
November 3	vs. Indiana	Washington Park; Indianapolis, IN	W 26–3		
November 10	at Wisconsin	Camp Randall Stadium; Madison, WI	W 16–3		
November 17	Illinois	Ohio Field; Columbus, OH (rivalry)	W 13–0		
November 24	vs. Auburn*	Soldiers Field; Montgomery, AL	T 0–0	10,000	
November 29	Camp Sherman (Chillicothe)*	Ohio Field; Columbus, OH	W 28–0		
*Non-conference game

== Coaching staff ==
- John Wilce, head coach, fifth year
