= 1917 Minnesota Golden Gophers football team =

American college football season

1917 Minnesota Golden Gophers football
- Conference: Big Ten Conference
- Record: 4–1 (3–1 Big Ten)
- Head coach: Henry L. Williams (18th season)
- Captain: George Hauser
- Home stadium: Northrop Field

1917 Big Ten Conference football standings
	Conf.					Overall
Team	W		L		T	W		L		T
Ohio State $	4	–	0	–	0	8	–	0	–	1
Minnesota	3	–	1	–	0	4	–	1	–	0
Northwestern	3	–	2	–	0	5	–	2	–	0
Wisconsin	3	–	2	–	0	4	–	2	–	1
Illinois	2	–	2	–	1	5	–	2	–	1
Chicago	2	–	2	–	1	3	–	2	–	1
Indiana	1	–	2	–	0	5	–	2	–	0
Michigan	0	–	1	–	0	8	–	2	–	0
Iowa	0	–	2	–	0	3	–	5	–	0
Purdue	0	–	4	–	0	3	–	4	–	0
$ – Conference champion

The 1917 Minnesota Golden Gophers football team represented the University of Minnesota in the 1917 college football season. In their 18th year under head coach Henry L. Williams, the Golden Gophers compiled a 4–1 record (3–1 against Big Ten Conference opponents) and outscored their opponents by a combined total of 164 to 25.

The 1917 season was almost canceled due to the United States entering World War I, but over the summer, the decision was made to play a reduced football schedule. The team finished second in the Big Ten.

Tackle George Hauser was named an All-American by the Associated Press. Hauser was also named All-Big Ten first team.

== Schedule ==
Date	Opponent	Site	Result	Attendance	Source
October 13	South Dakota State*	Northrop Field; Minneapolis, MN	W 64–0		
October 20	Indiana	Northrop Field; Minneapolis, MN	W 33–9		
November 3	at Wisconsin	Camp Randall Stadium; Madison, WI (rivalry)	L 7–10	12,000	
November 17	Chicago	Northrop Field; Minneapolis, MN	W 33–0	14,000–16,000	
November 24	at Illinois	Illinois Field; Champaign, IL	W 27–6	4,500	
*Non-conference game
