= 1917 Purdue Boilermakers football team =

American college football season

1917 Purdue Boilermakers football
- Conference: Big Ten Conference
- Record: 3–4 (0–4 Big Ten)
- Head coach: Cleo A. O'Donnell (2nd season)
- Captain: William J. Berns
- Home stadium: Stuart Field

1917 Big Ten Conference football standings
| | Conf. | | | | | Overall |
| Team | W | | L | | T | W | | L | | T |
|---|---|---|---|---|---|---|---|---|---|---|
| Ohio State $ | 4 | – | 0 | – | 0 | 8 | – | 0 | – | 1 |
| Minnesota | 3 | – | 1 | – | 0 | 4 | – | 1 | – | 0 |
| Northwestern | 3 | – | 2 | – | 0 | 5 | – | 2 | – | 0 |
| Wisconsin | 3 | – | 2 | – | 0 | 4 | – | 2 | – | 1 |
| Illinois | 2 | – | 2 | – | 1 | 5 | – | 2 | – | 1 |
| Chicago | 2 | – | 2 | – | 1 | 3 | – | 2 | – | 1 |
| Indiana | 1 | – | 2 | – | 0 | 5 | – | 2 | – | 0 |
| Michigan | 0 | – | 1 | – | 0 | 8 | – | 2 | – | 0 |
| Iowa | 0 | – | 2 | – | 0 | 3 | – | 5 | – | 0 |
| Purdue | 0 | – | 4 | – | 0 | 3 | – | 4 | – | 0 |
$ – Conference champion

The 1917 Purdue Boilermakers football team was an American football team that represented Purdue University during the 1917 college football season. In their second season under head coach Cleo A. O'Donnell, the Boilermakers compiled a 3–4 record, finished in last place in the Big Ten Conference with an 0–4 record against conference opponents, and were outscored by their opponents by a total of 109 to 95. William J. Berns was the team captain.

== Schedule ==
| Date | Opponent | Site | Result | Attendance | Source |
|---|---|---|---|---|---|
| October 6 | Franklin (IN)* | Stuart Field; West Lafayette, IN | W 54–0 | | |
| October 13 | DePauw* | Stuart Field; West Lafayette, IN | W 7–6 | | |
| October 21 | at Chicago | Stagg Field; Chicago, IL (rivalry) | L 0–27 | | |
| October 27 | at Illinois | Illinois Field; Champaign, IL (rivalry) | L 0–27 | | |
| November 3 | Northwestern | Stuart Field; West Lafayette, IN | L 6–12 | | |
| November 17 | Wabash* | Stuart Field; West Lafayette, IN | W 28–0 | | |
| November 24 | Indiana | Stuart Field; West Lafayette, IN (Old Oaken Bucket) | L 0–37 | | |
*Non-conference game

== Roster ==
- E. H. Allen, HB
- C. A. Bartlett, G
- Bill Berns, T
- J. J. Bosonitz, G
- Cecil Cooley, G
- Herbert L. Hart, C
- Harold Hickey, E
- Ken Huffine, FB
- Robert Hume, QB
- F. O. Jordan, G
- F. MacDonald, E
- Bob Markley, RH
- R. Morrish, T
- J. Olmstead, C
- M. M. Smith, E
