= Frank Culver =

American football player and attorney (1897–1955)

Frank Ward Culver
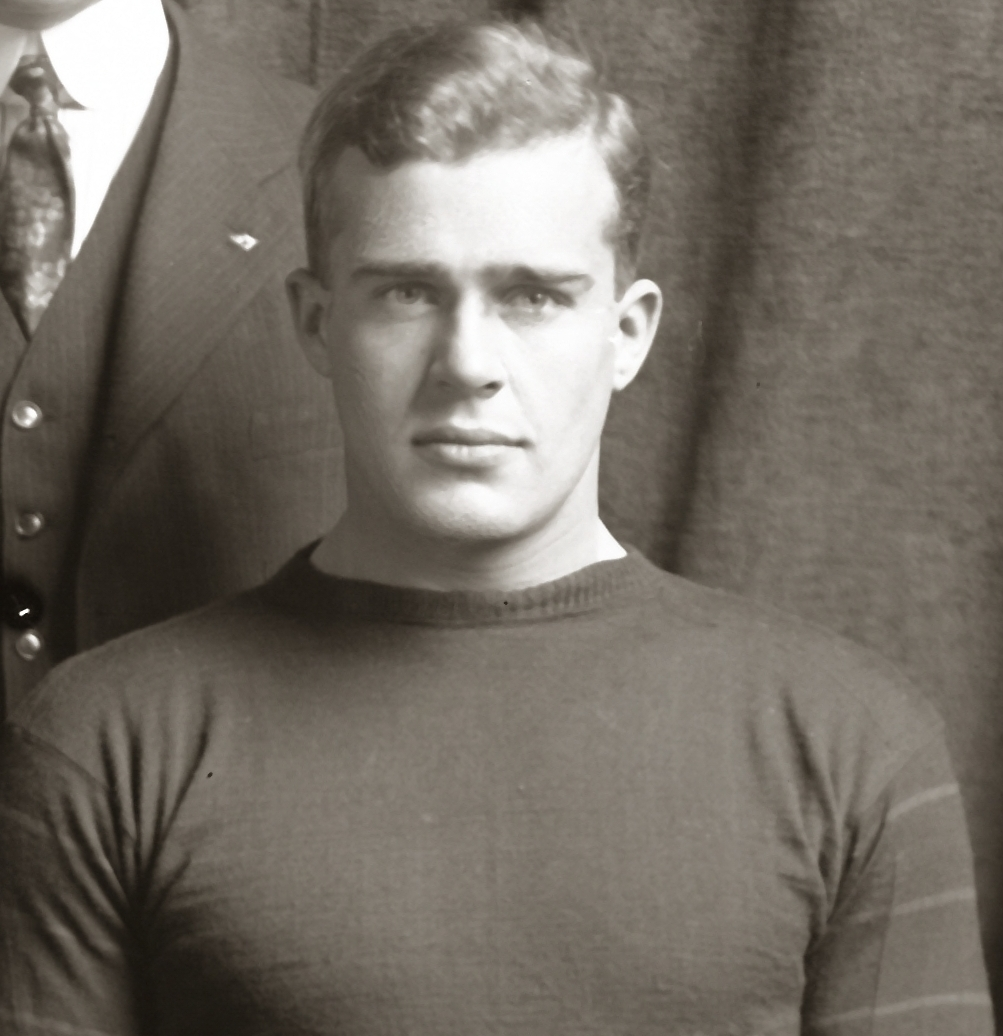
- Culver cropped from 1919 Michigan football team photograph
- Born: May 28, 1897; Detroit, Michigan, U.S.
- Died: December 12, 1955 (aged 58); Detroit, Michigan, U.S.
- Education: University of Michigan
- Occupations: Attorney and chief assistant prosecutor
- Known for: All-American, 1917

Frank Ward Culver (May 28, 1897 – December 12, 1955) was an American college football player and attorney. He played football for the University of Michigan in 1917 and 1919 and was selected as an All-American at the guard position in 1917.

== Early years ==
Culver was born in Detroit in 1897 and graduated from Detroit Central High School. His father, Charles Culver, was a member of the Michigan House of Representatives starting in 1914.

== University of Michigan ==
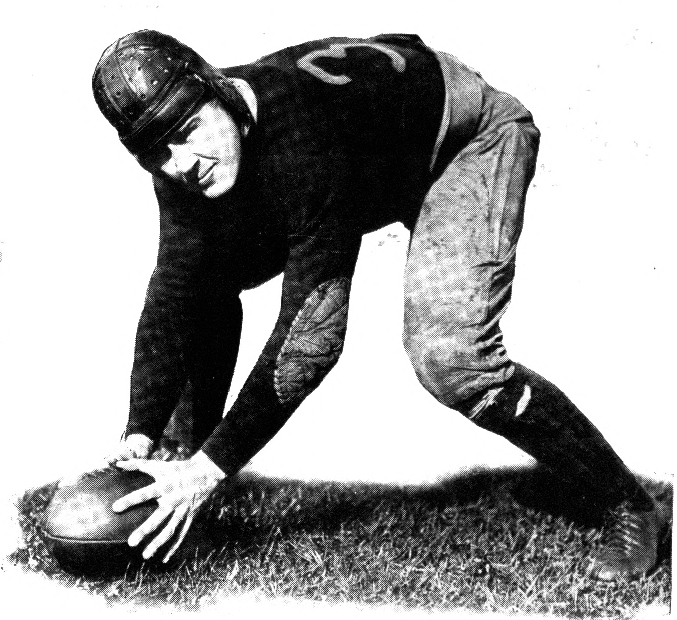
Frank Culver, 1919

Culver attended the University of Michigan and played for the Michigan Wolverines under Fielding H. Yost in 1917 and 1919. As a sophomore in 1917, he started three games at left tackle, four games at left guard, and one game at right guard. He was selected by Paul Purman as a first-team guard, and by Jack Veiock as a second-team guard, on the 1917 College Football All-America Team.

In January 1918, Culver enlisted in a U.S. Navy auxiliary unit organized at the university. He served on the USS Louisville.

After the war, Culver returned to Michigan. In 1919, he started one game at guard and three games at center.

== Legal career ==
Culver graduated from the University of Michigan in 1920 and studied law at Detroit College of Law. In 1925, he joined the prosecutor's office in Detroit. He also taught criminal law at Detroit College of Law. In 1928, he was named the chief assistant to Wayne County prosecutor James E. Chenot. At age 31, he was the youngest man to hold the chief assistant prosecutor's job in Wayne County. He resigned from the prosecutor's office in 1931 to go into private practice.

== Family ==
He was married to Christine Murkett. They had four sons, Frank Ward Jr. (born c. 1926), Christopher (born c. 1927), Philip (born 1932), and John (born c. 1935).

== Death ==
In December 1955, Culver collapsed and died on the witness stand in a Detroit courtroom while testifying in a matter connected to the Dodge estate.
