= Archie Weston =

American football player (1895–1981)

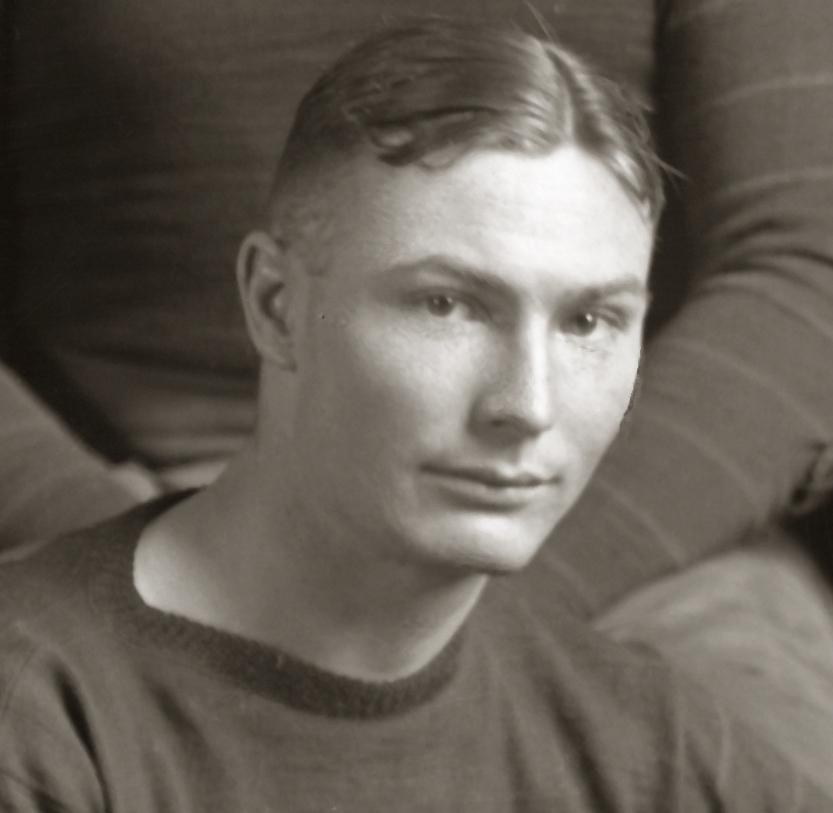
- Archie Weston cropped from 1919 Michigan football team photograph
- Born: Archie Bruce Weston; June 9, 1895; Alpena, Michigan
- Died: April 1981 (aged 85); Waterbury, Connecticut
- Citizenship: United States
- Education: University of Michigan
- Years active: 1917–1919
- Known for: All-American college football quarterback, 1917

Archie Bruce "Beak" Weston (June 9, 1895 – April 1981) was an American football player who was a quarterback for the University of Michigan in 1917 and a halfback in 1919. He was selected as a first-team All-American in 1917 by Chicago Tribune sports editor Walter Eckersall.

== Youth in Michigan's Upper Peninsula ==
Weston was born in Alpena, Michigan to Frank and Jane Weston . He was raised in Sault Ste. Marie, and was a star player on Sault Ste. Marie High School's 1913 state championship football team. The Sault Ste. Marie "Blue Devils" were a football powerhouse with Weston. In a 1972 interview with his home town newspaper, Weston recalled the 1913 championship team: "We were an awful bunch of roughnecks – there was no football team in the state tougher than we were that year. We blasted all of them and loved doing it." Weston was asked about a 1913 newspaper report that he had been tackled by an irate woman during a 24–7 win over Alpena. He recalled the incident:

The game was played there, and the fans hated us. We were too rough to suit them. I was running around the left end toward the Alpena side of the field. There was nobody near me as I ran the end, and all of a sudden, this woman dives from the sideline and drops me for no gain. Well, I was so surprised I couldn't get up at first.

== Playing for the University of Michigan ==
=== All-American in 1917 ===
Weston began the 1917 college football season as a second substitute quarterback for Fielding H. Yost's University of Michigan football team. Cliff Sparks started the first two games as Michigan's quarterback, with Lowell Genebach as his substitute. Sparks was injured in the second game of the season, and Yost gave Weston the start against Mount Union College. Weston seized the opportunity and put on an offensive display that attracted national attention. On the second play of the game, Weston "straight-armed and dodged the entire Mount Union team, running sixty-five yards for a touchdown." Weston scored a total of five touchdowns in the first two quarters and led the Wolverines to a 69–0 win over Mount Union. Following the game, one newspaper called him a "sensation" under the headline: "Yost Discovers Star Performer."

Weston celebrated his first day of play on a Michigan varsity team by tearing up the enemy so fast that the [sic?] had to quit giving himself the ball -- he made so many gains that he was wearing out his team making them keep up with him.

An Iowa newspaper also took note of Weston's debut:

Weston brought his rating up from that of a second substitute quarterback to that of the star of Yost's men. He played an unrivaled game despite his handicap of weighing only 143 pounds. He is the lightest and fastest man on the team.

Weston won the starting quarterback position and led the Wolverines in the next six games, outscoring their opponents by a combined score of 234 to 3. After his first three starts, Weston faced a major test against a strong Nebraska team. In a profile of the Wolverines published the week before the game, The Lincoln Daily Star focused on Weston: "Weston is continuing to improve at the quarterback. Work seems to agree with him; he has put on three pounds of weight since he became famous two weeks ago, being no longer the lightest man on the squad." Leading the Wolverines to a 20–0 win over Nebraska, his reputation continued to grow.

The Wolverines followed the shutout of Nebraska with a 69–0 win over Kalamazoo and a 42–0 win over eastern power Cornell. Weston gained over 300 yards on the ground against Kalamazoo and Cornell, making him a favorite for All-American honors. In the game against Cornell, Weston also intercepted a pass in the first quarter and returned it 80 yards for the first of his three touchdowns. The Syracuse Herald described Weston's interception return: "After Cornell's backs were held they tried a forward pass, Pendleton chucking the leather into Weston's hands. The little 'Eel' grabbed the spheroid and dashed down the field with it seventy-five yards for a touchdown." His performance against Cornell also included runs of 45, 35, and 25 yards, leading sportswriters to note his "remarkable skill as an open field runner." The Associated Press reported on Weston's performance against Cornell as follows:

Weston, Michigan's little quarterback, made most of Michigan's gains and his wonderful open field running kept the crowd on edge. ... Quarterback Weston, the smallest field general Michigan has ever had, played a game that will live long in Michigan history. ... Every touchdown that Michigan made was directly or indirectly the result of Weston's magnificent gains."

After conquering Cornell at Ferry Field in Ann Arbor, the undefeated Michigan team traveled east to Philadelphia to play Penn. News of Weston's skills had spread to the East Coast. However, it was reported after the game that "the football fans of the East who gathered at Philadelphia for the Penn-Michigan game to get a glimpse of Weston, the Michigan quarterback, who is touted as a greater player than the famous Willie Heston, were treated to a disappointment." During the first half of play, Weston got into a fistfight with Penn halfback Strauss, and both players were ejected from the game. The Associated Press reported that the ejection of Weston was a serious loss and that the Michigan team "did not play with sustained power" after Weston's departure. His replacement at quarterback, Genebach, fumbled a punt, allowing Penn to recover the ball at the ten-yard-line in the third quarter. Penn won the game 16–0, and one eastern sports editor noted, "Weston, it appears, would make a better battler than a football star."

Weston's difficulties continued when it was announced two days before the season's final game that he would be barred from participation for his poor academic performance.

After starting the season with eight wins and no losses, the Wolverines finished the years with losses in the final two games, both without Weston. This led sports columnist Grantland Rice to compare Weston to Ty Cobb:

Detroit's Tigers can get along without Ty Cobb as easily as Michigan can get along without Weston. Michigan with Weston could beat Nebraska 20 to 0. Michigan, minus Weston, was soft and woolly picking. A good quarterback is more to be chosen than great riches, or than tackles, halfbacks or ends.

Weston's loss of academic eligibility caused most All-American and All-Western selectors to overlook him. One newspaper wrote, "It is certain that Weston of Michigan, had he not been declared ineligible, would have been the easy pick for the honor." The one major All-American selector who chose Weston as his first-team All-American quarterback was Walter Eckersall of the Chicago Tribune. Eckersall was the referee for the Michigan-Cornell game, where he had been an up-close witness to Weston's performance. Another reporter credited Weston with being the "backbone" of Michigan's offense.

Weston was one of the sensations of the west this year. Flashing to recognition from the scrub eleven, he proved the backbone of Michigan's offense and is expected to be the Wolverines' field general next year.

=== Military service in 1918 ===
The United States entered World War I before the 1917 college football season began. Weston enlisted in the U.S. Army, and during the 1917 season had already been commissioned a second lieutenant in the Corps of Engineers. He was granted leave to play by the Army during autumn 1917, but in December 1917 he announced he hoped to be called to active duty. By April 1918, newspapers reported a majority of members of Michigan's 1917 football team, including Weston, were on active duty in the military. Weston was assigned to Chanute Aviation Field in Rantoul, Illinois, where he was quarterback and captain of the Chanute Field football team. However, Weston and two others were dismissed from the Army in October 1918 "following an incident in Decatur, in which the automobile in which he was riding was painted yellow because of alleged violation of the gasless Sunday order."

=== Switch to halfback in 1919 ===
After the war, Weston returned to the Michigan football team. He started all seven of Michigan's games in 1917 as a halfback (five as left halfback and two as right halfback), and Cliff Sparks took over as quarterback. The 1919 Michigan team finished with a disappointing 3–4 record and a 7th-place finish in the Western Conference.

== Later years ==
Following his university days, Weston moved to Connecticut, where he married and raised a family. He remained active, speaking to the Sault Ste. Marie football team, attending Michigan football games, and traveling between Michigan and his home in Waterbury, Connecticut.

Archie Weston died in Waterbury in April 1981, at the age of 85. He was survived by his wife, Lena.

== See also ==
- 1917 College Football All-America Team
