= 1917 Akron football team =

American college football season

1917 Akron football
- Conference: Ohio Athletic Conference
- Record: 5–3 (3–1 OAC)
- Head coach: Fred Sefton (3rd season)
- Captain: Tommy Tomkinson
- Home stadium: Buchtel Field

1917 Ohio Athletic Conference football standings
	Conf.					Overall
Team	W		L		T	W		L		T
Miami (OH) $	5	–	0	–	1	6	–	0	–	2
Wooster	5	–	0	–	3	6	–	0	–	3
Wittenberg	4	–	1	–	0	5	–	2	–	0
Oberlin	4	–	1	–	0	5	–	2	–	1
Akron	3	–	1	–	0	5	–	3	–	0
Denison	2	–	2	–	0	5	–	3	–	0
Ohio Wesleyan	3	–	3	–	1	4	–	3	–	1
Western Reserve	3	–	3	–	1	3	–	5	–	1
Ohio	3	–	3	–	0	3	–	5	–	0
Case	3	–	4	–	1	3	–	6	–	1
Kenyon	2	–	3	–	1	3	–	3	–	1
Mount Union	1	–	5	–	0	2	–	6	–	0
Ohio Northern	0	–	4	–	0	3	–	4	–	0
Baldwin–Wallace	0	–	7	–	0	1	–	8	–	0
Cincinnati	0	–	4	–	0	0	–	6	–	0
Ohio State *	3	–	0	–	0	8	–	0	–	1
$ – Conference champion; * – did not complete for championship

The 1917 Akron football team represented the University of Akron, formerly Buchtel College, in the 1917 college football season. The team was led by head coach Fred Sefton, in his third season. For the first time since the 1912 season, Akron outscored their opponents, by a total of 143-84.

== Schedule ==
Date	Opponent	Site	Result	Attendance	Source
September 29	Muskingum*	Buchtel Field; Akron, OH	W 33–3		
October 6	Heidelberg*	Buchtel Field; Akron, OH	L 6–34		
October 13	Western Reserve	Buchtel Field; Akron, OH	W 33–0		
October 20	Wooster	Buchtel Field; Akron, OH	L 6–7		
October 27	Ohio Northern	Buchtel Field; Akron, OH	W 20–0		
November 3	Mount Union	Buchtel Field; Akron, OH	W 20–0		
November 17	Camp Sherman*	Buchtel Field; Akron, OH	W 25–7		
November 24	at Allegheny*	Meadville, PA	L 0–33	less than 200	
*Non-conference game
