= Alfred L. Buser =

American football player and coach (1888–1956)

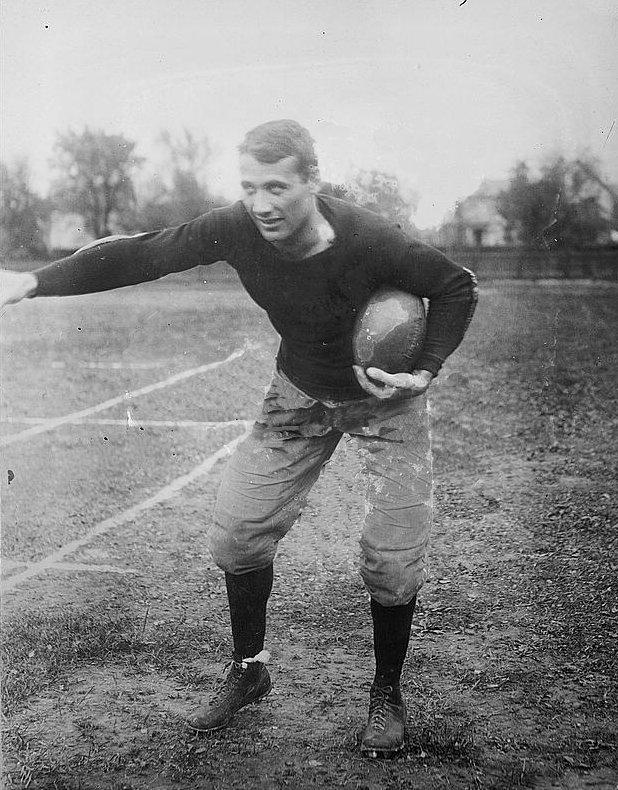
- Buser in 1911 as Wisconsin team captain

Biographical details
- Born: September 21, 1888; Madison, Wisconsin, U.S.
- Died: December 3, 1956 (aged 68); Minneapolis, Minnesota, U.S.

Playing career
- 1908–1911: Wisconsin
- Positions: Guard, tackle

Coaching career (HC unless noted)
- 1917–1919: Florida
- 1920–1922: Saint Paul Central HS (MN)
- 1924: Hamline

Administrative career (AD unless noted)
- 1917–1919: Florida
- 1924–1925: Hamline

Head coaching record
- Overall: 8–13 (college)

Accomplishments and honors

Awards
- Third-team All-American (1911); First-team All-Western Conference (1911)

Alfred Leo Buser (September 21, 1888 – December 3, 1956), nicknamed Al Buser, was an American football player and coach. Buser played college football for the University of Wisconsin, and was recognized as an All-American. He later became the fourth head coach of the Florida Gators football team that represents the University of Florida.

== Early years ==
Buser was born in Madison, Wisconsin in 1888. He attended Madison High School, where he was a stand-out high school football player and track and field athlete, and graduated in 1907.

== College career ==
After graduating from high school, Buser attended the University of Wisconsin in Madison. Buser played tackle for the Wisconsin Badgers football team from 1908 to 1911. He memorably scored a touchdown as a lineman in the 1910 game against Chicago. As a senior, he was elected captain of the 1911 football team. The 1911 Badgers finished 5–1–1—their sole loss was a 5–0 edging by the Chicago Maroons. After his junior year, Buser was named an All-American by Outing magazine, after his senior season, Buser was again named an All-American by Outing, a first-team All-American by The New York Globe, a Walter Camp third-team All-American, and a Collier's first-team All-Western Conference tackle. He lettered three years in football and once in track, as a shot-putter.

Buser graduated from Wisconsin in 1912, and served as the director of athletics of the Wisconsin athletic association during 1913. Buser married the former Leila W. Mathews that same year.

== Coaching career ==
From 1917 to 1919, Buser was the head coach of the Florida Gators football team that represented the University of Florida in Gainesville. Early expectations were high for Buser's first Gators team in 1917. The Gators opened their season with a 21–13 win over South Carolina Gamecocks, after falling behind early, but lost their remaining four Southern Intercollegiate Athletic Association (SIAA) games to the Tulane Green Wave, Auburn Tigers, Clemson Tigers, and Kentucky Wildcats. During his three seasons leading the Gators, Buser compiled a 7–8 record, including the one-game 1918 season shortened by the 1918 influenza pandemic and World War I. Buser was also the university's athletic director and the professor in charge of its physical education department. After an improved 5–3 season in 1919, Buser was replaced by William G. Kline.

In 1920, Buser was hired as athletic coach at Saint Paul Central High School in Saint Paul, Minnesota and mentored the football team for three seasons. He also coached a number of other sports at Central. Buser was the athletic director for Hamline University in Saint Paul during the 1924–25 academic year and head football coach for the Pipers in the fall of 1924.

== Later life and death ==
In 1925, he was elected as the first president of the W Club, the University of Wisconsin's lettermen's association, as well as a member of the board of directors of the Wisconsin Alumni Association in 1943. He was also a member of the Iron Cross Society, the university's leadership honorary.

Buser died in Minneapolis, in 1956.

== Head coaching record ==
=== College ===
Year	Team	Overall	Conference	Standing	Bowl/playoffs
Florida Gators (Southern Intercollegiate Athletic Association) (1917–1919)
1917	Florida	2–4	1–4		
1918	Florida	0–1	NA	NA	
1919	Florida	5–3	2–3		
Florida:		7–8	3–7		
Hamline Pipers (Midwest Conference / Minnesota Intercollegiate Athletic Conference) (1924)
1924	Hamline	1–5	0–2 / 1–3	T–8th / 7th	
Hamline:		1–5	1–4		
Total:		8–13			

== See also ==
- List of University of Florida faculty and administrators
- List of University of Wisconsin–Madison people
