= Eben Wortham =

American football player and educator (1897–1982)

Profile
- Position: Fullback

Personal information
- Born: July 22, 1897; Greenville, Mississippi, U.S.
- Died: August 1, 1982 (aged 85); Nashville, Tennessee, U.S.
- Listed height: 5 ft 7 in (1.70 m)
- Listed weight: 156 lb (71 kg)

Career information
- College: Sewanee (1916–1918)

Awards and highlights
- All-Southern (1917)

Eben Alexander "Pep" Wortham (July 22, 1897 – August 1, 1982) was a college football player and educator.

== Sewanee ==
=== Playing career ===
Wortham was a prominent fullback for the Sewanee Tigers of the University of the South.

==== 1916 ====
In 1916, Dick Jemison picked Bill Folger out of North Carolina as a halfback for his All-Southern team. Jemison said had he constrained his selections to the Southern Intercollegiate Athletic Association, Wortham would have taken his spot.

==== 1917 ====
In 1917, the year of Georgia Tech's great backfield, he made the All-Southern teams of Dick Jemison, sporting editor for the Atlanta Constitution, Fred Digby, sporting editor for the New Orleans Item, and Zipp Newman, assistant sporting editor for the Birmingham News. He drop-kicked a 40-yard field goal in the game against LSU to win 3 to 0. Also he drop-kicked a 27-yard field goal in a 3 to 3 tie at Alabama.

=== Teaching career ===
After football, he signed on to the university's faculty to teach mathematics, history, tactics, and boxing.
