= Bill Streit =

Bill Streit may refer to:

- C. W. Streit (1884–1971), known as Bill, American football player for Auburn University and Washington & Lee University, then a long time official
- Bradley Streit (1892–1978), known as Bill, American football fullback for Auburn University and Princeton University
