= 1917 Southern Intercollegiate Athletic Association football season =

- League: NCAA
- Sport: College football
- Duration: September 28, 1917 through November 29, 1917
- Teams: 17

Regular Season
- Season champions: Georgia Tech

Football seasons
- ← 1916 1918 →

1917 Southern Intercollegiate Athletic Association football standings
	Conf.					Overall
Team	W		L		T	W		L		T
Georgia Tech $	4	–	0	–	0	9	–	0	–	0
Auburn	5	–	1	–	0	6	–	2	–	1
Clemson	5	–	1	–	0	6	–	2	–	0
Centre	1	–	0	–	0	7	–	1	–	0
Mississippi A&M	3	–	1	–	0	6	–	1	–	0
Alabama	3	–	1	–	1	5	–	2	–	1
Sewanee	4	–	2	–	1	5	–	2	–	1
Tulane	2	–	1	–	0	5	–	3	–	0
Vanderbilt	3	–	2	–	0	5	–	3	–	0
LSU	2	–	3	–	0	3	–	5	–	0
South Carolina	2	–	3	–	0	3	–	5	–	0
Wofford	1	–	2	–	0	5	–	4	–	0
Furman	1	–	3	–	0	3	–	5	–	0
Florida	1	–	3	–	0	2	–	4	–	0
Ole Miss	1	–	4	–	0	1	–	4	–	1
Howard (AL)	0	–	2	–	1	3	–	3	–	1
The Citadel	0	–	2	–	0	3	–	3	–	0
Mississippi College	0	–	4	–	0	0	–	5	–	0
$ – Conference champion; There were several SIAA schools that did not field a team due to World War I.

The 1917 Southern Intercollegiate Athletic Association football season was the college football games played by the member schools of the Southern Intercollegiate Athletic Association as part of the 1917 college football season. The season began on September 28. A curtailing of expenses was required for extension into 1918.

John Heisman's Georgia Tech team won the conference and was the South's first consensus national champion. Tech captain Walker Carpenter and halfback Everett Strupper were the first players from the Deep South ever selected for an All-America first-team. Tech quarterback Albert Hill led the nation in scoring. Though Centre did not claim a championship, it also posted an undefeated conference record, beginning the rise of its football program.

== Regular season ==
Index to colors and formatting
Non-conference matchup; SIAA member won
Non-conference matchup; SIAA member lost
Non-conference matchup; tie
Conference matchup

SIAA teams in bold.

=== Week One ===
Date	Visiting team	Home team	Site	Result	Attendance	Reference
September 28	Presbyterian	**Clemson**	Riggs Field • Calhoun, SC	**W** 13–0		
September 28	**Furman**	**Georgia Tech**	Grant Field • Atlanta, GA	**GT** 25–0		
September 29	Wake Forest	**Georgia Tech**	Grant Field • Atlanta, GA	**W** 33–0		
September 29	Blountsville Aggies	**Howard (AL)**	Howard Athletic Field • Birmingham, AL	**W** 19–0		

=== Week Two ===
Date	Visiting team	Home team	Site	Result	Attendance	Reference
October 3	Second Ambulance Company of Ohio	Alabama	Soldiers Field • Montgomery, AL	**W** 7–0		
October 5	Marion	Mississippi A&M	New Athletic Field • Starkville, MS	**W** 18–6		
October 6	Jonesboro Aggies	Ole Miss	Hemingway Stadium • Oxford, MS	**T** 0–0		
October 6	8th Ohio Infantry	Auburn	Soldiers Field • Montgomery, AL	**W** 13–0	2,500	
October 6	Wake Forest	Furman	Riverside Park • Greenville, SC	**W** 7–6		
October 6	Penn	Georgia Tech	Grant Field • Atlanta, GA	**W** 41–0	10,000	
October 6	Southwestern Louisiana Industrial	LSU	State Field • Baton Rouge, LA	**W** 20–6		
October 6	Newberry	South Carolina	Davis Field • Columbia, SC	**W** 38–0		
October 6	Transylvania	Vanderbilt	Dudley Field • Nashville, TN	**W** 41–0		
October 6	Charleston Navy	The Citadel	College Park Stadium • Charleston, SC	**W** 19–7		
October 6	Guilford	Wofford	Spartanburg, SC	**W** 20–0		
October 6	**Howard (AL)**	Sewanee	Hardee Field • Sewanee, TN	**SEW** 42–7		
October 6	Jefferson College (LA)	Tulane	Tulane Stadium • New Orleans, LA	**W** 32–0		
October 6	Kentucky Military Institute	Centre	Cheek Field • Danville, KY	**W** 104–0		

=== Week Three ===
Date	Visiting team	Home team	Site	Result	Attendance	Reference
October 12	Marion	**Alabama**	University Field • Tuscaloosa, AL	**W** 13–0		
October 13	**Howard (AL)**	**Auburn**	Drake Field • Auburn, AL	**AUB** 53–0		
October 13	**Vanderbilt**	Chicago	Stagg Field • Chicago, IL	**L** 0–48		
October 13	**Clemson**	**Furman**	Riverside Park • Greenville, SC	**CLEM** 38–0		
October 13	**South Carolina**	**Florida**	Fleming Field • Gainesville, FL	**FLA** 21–13		
October 13	Davidson	**Georgia Tech**	Grant Field • Atlanta, GA	**W** 32–10		
October 13	**LSU**	**Ole Miss**	Hemingway Stadium • Oxford, MS	**LSU** 52–7		
October 13	**Mississippi College**	**Mississippi A&M**	New Athletic Field • Starkville, MS	**MSA&M** 68–0		
October 13	Transylvania	**Sewanee**	Andrews Field • Chattanooga, TN	**W** 76–0		
October 13	Spring Hill	**Tulane**	Tulane Stadium • New Orleans, LA	**W** 28–0		
October 13	Presbyterian	**The Citadel**	College Park Stadium • Charleston, SC	**L** 0–7		
October 13	New York Ambulance Corps	**Wofford**	Wofford Park • Spartanburg, SC	**W** 21–0		

=== Week Four ===
Date	Visiting team	Home team	Site	Result	Attendance	Reference
October 19	**Auburn**	**Clemson**	Riggs Field • Calhoun, SC	**AUB** 7–0		
October 20	Newberry	**Furman**	Riverside Park • Greenville, SC	**W** 20–7		
October 20	Washington and Lee	**Georgia Tech**	Grant Field • Atlanta, GA	**W** 63–0		
October 20	**Sewanee**	**LSU**	Heinemann Park • New Orleans, LA	**SEW** 3–0		
October 20	**Tulane**	**Florida**	Fleming Field • Gainesville, FL	**TUL** 52–0		
October 20	**Vanderbilt**	Kentucky	Stoll Field • Lexington, KY	**W** 5–0		
October 20	Erskine	**The Citadel**	College Park Stadium • Charleston, SC	**W** 18–7		
October 20	**Mississippi College**	**Alabama**	University Field • Tuscaloosa, AL	**ALA** 46–0		
October 20	Presbyterian	**Wofford**	Spartanburg, SC	**L** 6–7		
October 20	Marion	**Howard (AL)**	Rickwood Field • Birmingham, AL	**W** 12–7		
October 20	**Centre**	DePauw	Greencastle, IN	**L** 0–6		

=== Week Five ===
Date	Visiting team	Home team	Site	Result	Attendance	Reference
October 25	**Clemson**	**South Carolina**	State Fairgrounds • Columbia, SC	**CLEM** 21–13		
October 26	Erskine	**Wofford**	Spartanburg, SC	**W** 21–0		
October 26	**Ole Miss**	**Alabama**	University Field • Tuscaloosa, Alabama	**ALA** 64–0		
October 26	Ouachita	**Mississippi College**	Jackson, MS	**L** 0–7		
October 27	**Mississippi A&M**	**Auburn**	Rickwood Field • Birmingham, AL	**AUB** 13–6		
October 27	Southern College	**Florida**	Fleming Field • Gainesville, FL	**W** 19–7		
October 27	Kentucky	**Sewanee**	Andrews Field • Chattanooga, TN	**W** 7–0		
October 27	**LSU**	Texas A&M	League Park • San Antonio, TX	**L** 27–0		
October 27	141st Field Artillery	**Tulane**	Tulane Stadium • New Orleans, LA	**W** 19–0		
October 27	**Howard (AL)**	**Vanderbilt**	Dudley Field • Nashville, TN	**VAN** 69–0		
October 27	Newberry	**The Citadel**	College Park Stadium • Charleston, SC	**W** 32–7		
October 27	**Centre**	Maryville (TN)	Maryville, TN	**W** 34–0		

=== Week Six ===
Date	Visiting team	Home team	Site	Result	Attendance	Reference
November 1	**Clemson**	**Wofford**	Spartanburg, SC	**CLEM** 27–16		
November 2	**Tulane**	Texas A&M	Kyle Field • College Station, TX	**L** 0–35		
November 3	Arkansas	**LSU**	Fair Grounds Field • Shreveport, LA	**L** 0–14		
November 3	**Florida**	**Auburn**	Drake Field • Auburn, AL	**AUB** 68–0		
November 3	Davidson	**Furman**	Riverside Park • Greenville, SC	**L** 7–28		
November 3	**Vanderbilt**	**Georgia Tech**	Grant Field • Atlanta, GA	**GT** 83–0		
November 3	**Ole Miss**	**Mississippi A&M**	Fair Grounds • Tupelo, MS	**MSA&M** 41–14	1,000	
November 3	**Sewanee**	**Alabama**	Rickwood Field • Birmingham, AL	**T** 3–3		
November 3	Erskine	**South Carolina**	Davis Field • Columbia, SC	**L** 13–14		
November 3	Kentucky	**Centre**	Cheek Field • Danville, KY	**W** 3–0		

=== Week Seven ===
Date	Visiting team	Home team	Site	Result	Attendance	Reference
November 8	**The Citadel**	**Clemson**	County Fairgrounds • Orangeburg, SC	**CLEM** 20–0		
November 8	**Furman**	**South Carolina**	Pee Dee Fair • Florence, SC	**SCAR** 26–0		
November 9	Acipco YMCA	**Howard (AL)**	Birmingham, AL	**W** 31–0		
November 9	**Wofford**	Newberry	Newberry, SC	**W** 45–0		
November 9	**Centre**	Kentucky Wesleyan	Winchester, KY	**W** 37–0		
November 10	Davidson	**Auburn**	Grant Field • Atlanta, GA	**L** 7–21		
November 10	**Georgia Tech**	**Tulane**	Tulane Stadium • New Orleans, LA	**GT** 48–0		
November 10	**Mississippi College**	**LSU**	State Field • Baton Rouge, LA	**LSU** 34–0		
November 10	Kentucky	**Mississippi A&M**	New Athletic Field • Starkville, MS	**W** 14–0		
November 10	**Ole Miss**	**Sewanee**	Hardee Field • Sewanee, TN	**SEW** 69–7		
November 10	**Vanderbilt**	**Alabama**	Rickwood Field • Birmingham, AL	**VAN** 7–2		

=== Week Eight ===
Date	Visiting team	Home team	Site	Result	Attendance	Reference
November 17	**Alabama**	Kentucky	Stoll Field • Lexington, KY	**W** 27–0		
November 17	**Auburn**	**Vanderbilt**	Dudley Field • Nashville, TN	**AUB** 31–7		
November 17	**Centre**	**Sewanee**	Chamberlain Field • Chattanooga, TN	**CEN** 28–0		
November 17	**Clemson**	**Florida**	Barrs Field • Jacksonville, FL	**CLEM** 55–7		
November 17	Carlisle	**Georgia Tech**	Grant Field • Atlanta, GA	**W** 98–0		
November 17	**Mississippi A&M**	**LSU**	State Field • Baton Rouge, LA	**MSA&M** 9–0		
November 17	Presbyterian	**Furman**	Riverside Park • Greenville, SC	**L** 7–14		
November 17	Rice	**Tulane**	Tulane Stadium • New Orleans, LA	**L** 0–16		
November 17	**South Carolina**	**Wofford**	Spartanburg Fairgrounds • Spartanburg, SC	**WOFF** 20–0		

=== Week Nine ===
Date	Visiting team	Home team	Site	Result	Attendance	Reference
November 24	Ohio State	**Auburn**	Soldiers Field • Montgomery, AL	**T** 0–0	10,000	
November 24	Presbyterian	**South Carolina**	Davis Field • Columbia, SC	**L** 14–20		
November 24	**Wofford**	Davidson	Sprunt Field • Davidson, NC	**L** 0–62		
November 24	**Centre**	Transylvania	Thomas Field • Lexington, KY	**W** 28–0		

=== Week Ten ===
Date	Visiting team	Home team	Site	Result	Attendance	Reference
November 29	Camp Gordon	**Alabama**	Rickwood Field • Birmingham, AL	**L** 6–19		
November 29	**Clemson**	Davidson	Wearn Field • Charlotte, NC	**L** 9–21		
November 29	**Wofford**	**Furman**	Riverside Park • Greenville, SC	**FUR** 18–3		
November 29	**Auburn**	**Georgia Tech**	Grant Field • Atlanta, GA	**GT** 68–7	20,000	
November 29	**Florida**	Kentucky	Stoll Field • Lexington, KY	**L** 0–52		
November 29	**Ole Miss**	**Mississippi College**	State Fairgrounds • Jackson, MS	**MISS** 21–0		
November 29	Haskell	**Mississippi A&M**	Russwood Park • Memphis, TN	**W** 7–6		
November 29	**The Citadel**	**South Carolina**	Davis Field • Columbia, SC	**SCAR** 20–0		
November 29	**Tulane**	**LSU**	State Field • Baton Rouge, LA	**TUL** 28–6		
November 29	**Sewanee**	**Vanderbilt**	Dudley Field • Nashville, TN	**VAN** 13–6		
November 29	**Howard (AL)**	Spring Hill	Monroe Field • Mobile, AL	**L** 7–12		
November 29	Georgetown (KY)	**Centre**	Cheek Field • Danville, KY	**W** 13–0		

== Awards and honors ==
=== All-Americans ===
- T – Walker Carpenter, Georgia Tech (MS, DJ)
- C – Pup Phillips, Georgia Tech (DJ)
- QB – Albert Hill, Georgia Tech (JV-2)
- HB – Everett Strupper, Georgia Tech (MS; JV-2; PP-1 [qb], DJ [qb])
- HB – Joe Guyon, Georgia Tech (PP-2, DJ)

=== All-Southern team ===
The composite All-Southern eleven formed by the selection of 7 coaches and sporting writers included:

Position	Name	Height	Weight (lbs.)	Class	Hometown	Team
QB	Albert Hill	5'7"	164	Sr.	Washington, Georgia	Georgia Tech
HB	Everett Strupper	5'7"	148	Sr.	Columbus, Georgia	Georgia Tech
HB	Buck Flowers	5'7"	140	Fr.	Sumter, South Carolina	Davidson
FB	Joe Guyon	5'11"	186	Jr.	Magdalena, New Mexico	Georgia Tech
E	Moon Ducote	5'10"	187	Jr.	Cottonport, Louisiana	Auburn
T	Walker Carpenter	6'2"	184	Sr.	Newnan, Georgia	Georgia Tech
G	Pete Bonner	6'2"	183	So.	Clay Co., Alabama	Auburn
C	Pup Phillips	6'0"	182	Jr.	Carnesville, Georgia	Georgia Tech
G	Tram Sessions			So.	Birmingham, Alabama	Alabama
T	Bill Fincher	6'0"	182	So.	Atlanta	Georgia Tech
E	Alfred T. Adams		175	So.	Nashville, Tennessee	Vanderbilt
