= 1917 College Football All-Southern Team =

American all-star college football team

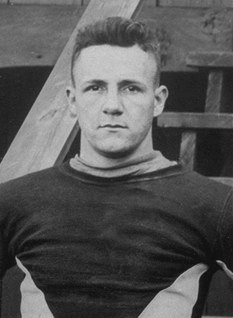
Everett Strupper of Georgia Tech

The 1917 College Football All-Southern Team consists of American football players selected to the College Football All-Southern Teams selected by various organizations for the 1917 Southern Intercollegiate Athletic Association football season. Georgia Tech won the SIAA and the south's first national championship. Walker Carpenter and Everett Strupper were the first two players from the Deep South selected first-team All-American.

== Composite eleven ==
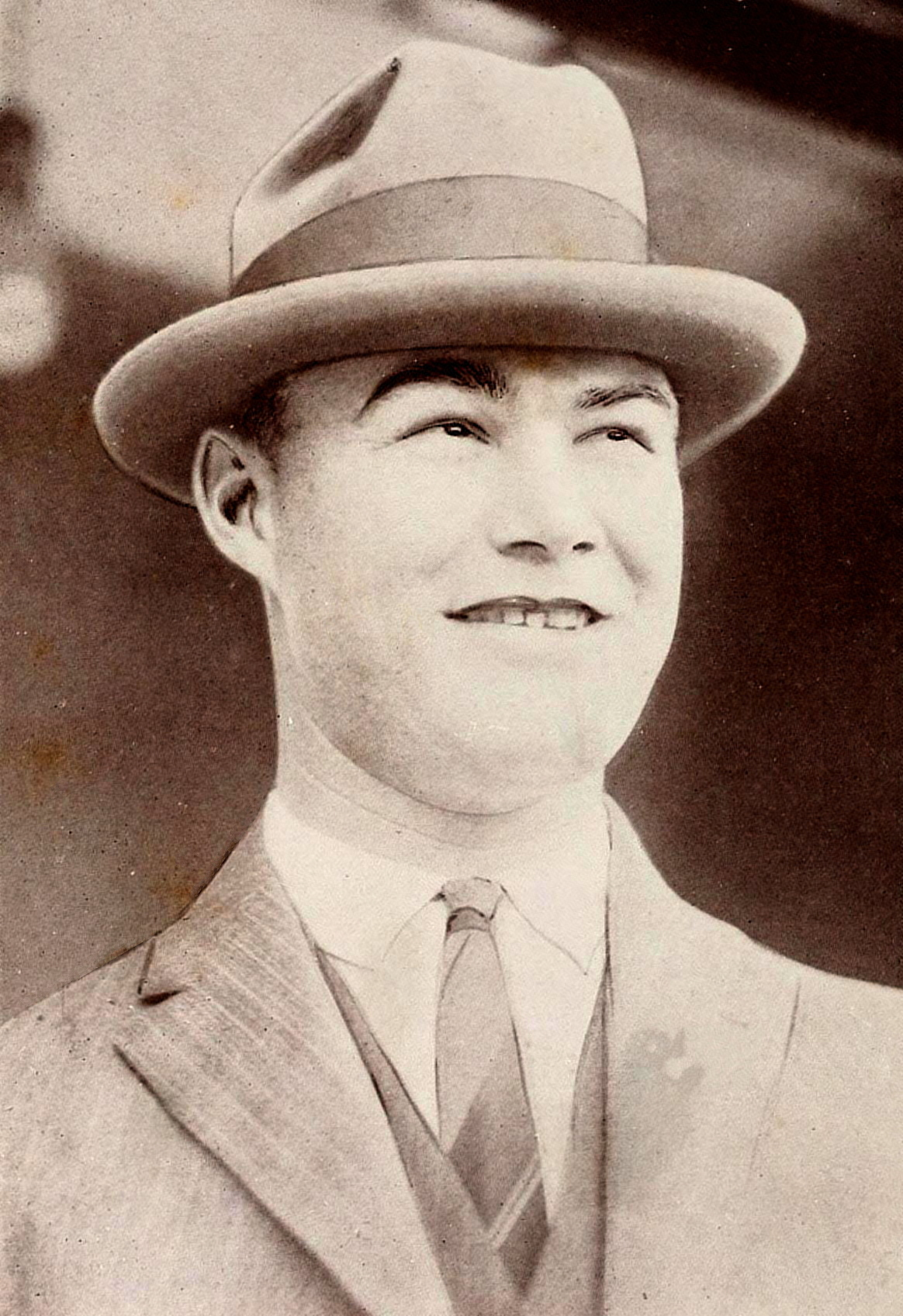
Moon Ducote of Auburn

The composite All-Southern eleven formed by the selection of seven coaches and sporting writers included:

- Alf Adams, end for Vanderbilt. Adams was also a basketball star and later a prominent attorney.
- Pete Bonner, guard for Auburn. Bonner is selected at guard for various all-time Auburn teams.
- Walker Carpenter, tackle and captain for Georgia Tech' championship team. He and Strupper were the first two players from the Deep South selected first-team All-American.
- Moon Ducote, end for Auburn. Ducote is often considered Auburn's greatest player of its early years. He also kicked and later coached.
- Bill Fincher, tackle for Georgia Tech, inducted into the College Football Hall of Fame in 1974. He was also an all-time great as a placekicker.
- Buck Flowers, halfback for Davidson, inducted into the College Football Hall of Fame in 1955. He was selected for the Associated Press Southeast Area All-Time football team 1869-1919 era. He was just 17 years old when the season started, and also kicked.
- Joe Guyon, back for Georgia Tech, inducted into the College Football Hall of Fame in 1971 and the Pro Football Hall of Fame in 1966. He was unanimously selected for the Associated Press Southeast Area All-Time football team 1869-1919 era.
- Albert Hill, quarterback for Georgia Tech, received the most carries on Tech's championship team and was the nation's high scorer.
- Pup Phillips, center for Georgia Tech. Phillips received the Hal Nowell trophy for the most efficient play during the season, and left to join the American effort in the First World War as a marine just a week after celebrating the title
- Tram Sessions, guard for Alabama. He was later involved in politics and attempted to pass a resolution to re-establish the Auburn–Alabama rivalry.
- Everett Strupper, halfback for Georgia Tech, inducted into the College Football Hall of Fame in 1972. He was deaf and produced the most yards for Tech's championship team.

== Composite overview ==
Seven players were unanimous All-Southern.

Name	Position	School	First-team selections
Moon Ducote	End	Auburn	7
Walker Carpenter	Tackle	Georgia Tech	7
Bill Fincher	Tackle	Georgia Tech	7
Pete Bonner	Guard	Auburn	7
Pup Phillips	Center	Georgia Tech	7
Everett Strupper	Halfback	Georgia Tech	7
Joe Guyon	Fullback	Georgia Tech	7
Albert Hill	Quarterback	Georgia Tech	6
Eben Wortham	Fullback	Sewanee	4
Alf Adams	End	Vanderbilt	3
Tram Sessions	Guard	Alabama	3
Buck Flowers	Halfback	Davidson	3
Alfred M. Boone	End	Alabama	2
Shorty Guill	End	Georgia Tech	2
Georgie King	End	Davidson	1
Wooly Grey	Guard	Davidson	1
Carey Robinson	Guard	Auburn	1
Mutt Gee	Guard	Clemson	1
Otto Colee	Guard	Tulane	1

== All-Southerns of 1917 ==
=== Ends ===
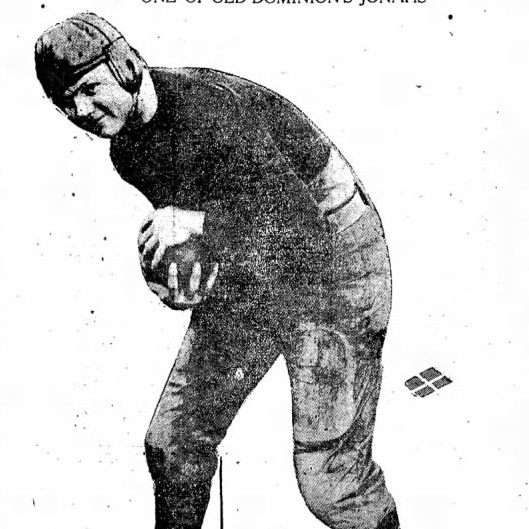
Alf Adams

- Moon Ducote†, Auburn (C, DJ, MB, FD [as hb], ZN, HB [as hb], H [as fb], FB [as fb], NT-1, CM, HW, GT [as u], HS [as fb])
- Alf Adams, Vanderbilt (C, DJ, H, FB, NT-1, GT, HS)
- Alfred M. Boone, Alabama (C, ZN, FB, HW)
- Shorty Guill, Georgia Tech (C, MB [as u], FD, HB, HW [as u], GT [as u], HS)
- Georgie King, Davidson (C, MB, H, NT-2, GT)
- Si Bell, Georgia Tech (HB)
- Woodson, Sewanee (NT-2)

=== Tackles ===
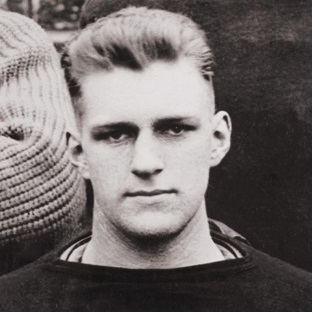
Walker Carpenter of Georgia Tech

- Walker Carpenter†, Georgia Tech (C, DJ, MB, FD, ZN, HB, H, FB, NT-1, CM [as e], HW, GT, HS [as g])
- Bill Fincher†, Georgia Tech (College Football Hall of Fame) (C, DJ [as g], MB, FD [as g], ZN [as g], HB [as g], H, FB [as g], NT-1, CM, HW, GT, HS [as g])
- Dan Whelchel, Georgia Tech (NT-2)
- Jack Hovater, Alabama (NT-2, HS)

=== Guards ===
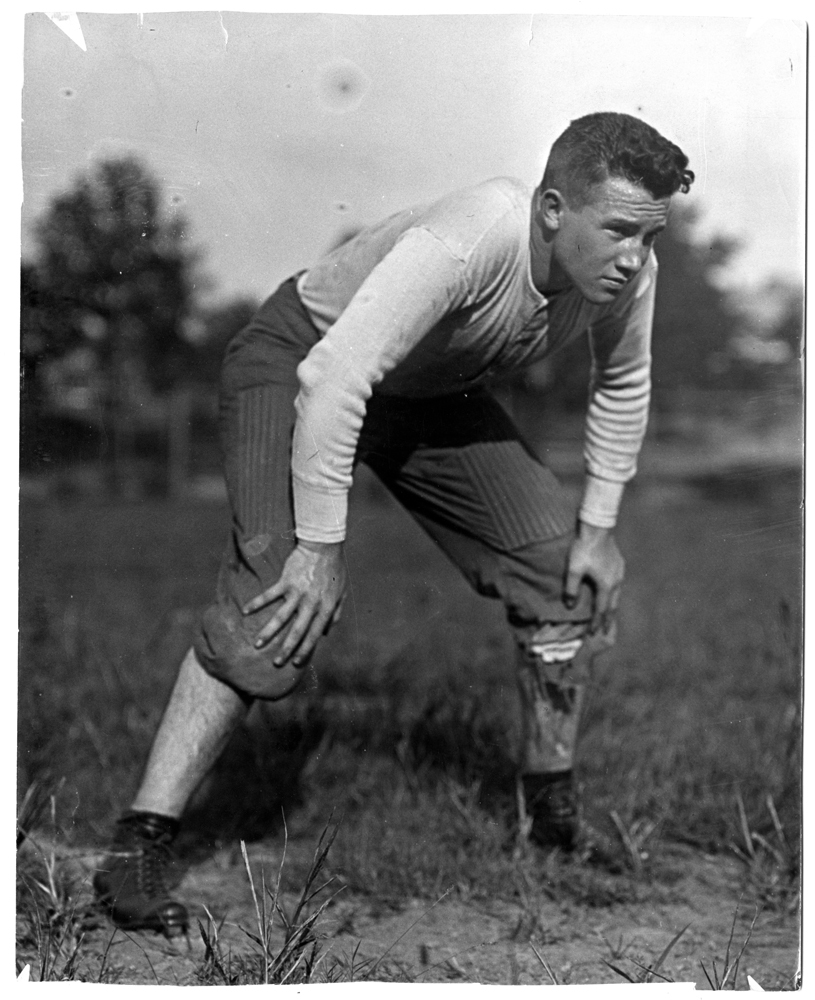
Pup Phillips

- Pete Bonner†, Auburn (C, DJ [as t], MB, FD [as t], ZN [as t], HB, H, FB [as t], NT-1, CM [as t], HW, GT)
- Tram Sessions, Alabama (C, ZN, FB, NT-1, HW)
- Wooly Grey, Davidson (C, DJ, H, NT-2, CM, GT)
- Mutt Gee, Clemson (C, CM)
- Carey Robinson, Auburn (C, MB, NT-2 [as c], HS [as c])
- Otto Colee, Tulane (C, FD [as t], HB [as t])
- Ham Dowling, Georgia Tech (NT-2)

=== Centers ===
- Pup Phillips†, Georgia Tech (C, DJ, MB, FD, ZN, HB, H, FB, NT-1, CM, HW, GT)

=== Quarterbacks ===
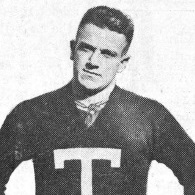
Al Hill of Georgia Tech

- Albert Hill, Georgia Tech (C, DJ, MB, FD, ZN, H, NT-1, CM, HW, GT [as fb], HS)
- Gene Davidson, Arkansas (HB)
- William Herschel Bobo, Mississippi A&M (NT-2)

=== Halfbacks ===
- Everett Strupper*†, Georgia Tech (College Football Hall of Fame) (C, DJ, MB, FD, ZN, HB, H, FB [as qb], NT-1, CM, HW, GT, HS)
- Buck Flowers, Davidson (College Football Hall of Fame) (C, DJ, MB, NT-1, CM, HW, GT [as qb])
- Donohue, Sewanee (NT-2)

=== Fullbacks ===
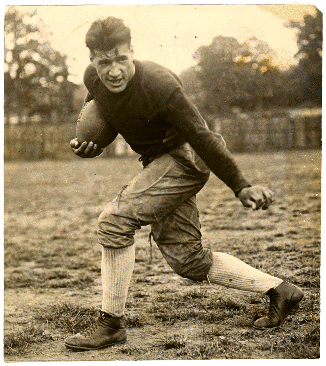
Joe Guyon

- Joe Guyon†, Georgia Tech (College Football Hall of Fame) (C, DJ [as e], MB, FD, ZN, HB, H [as hb], FB [as hb], NT-1, CM, HW, GT [as hb], HS [as hb])
- Eben Wortham, Sewanee (DJ, FD [as end], ZN [as hb], FB [as hb], NT-2 [as hb])
- Revington, Auburn (NT-2)

== Key ==
Bold = Composite selection

* = Consensus All-American

† = Unanimous selection

C = composite selection picked by seven football writers in the South. The seven were Dick Jemison, John Heisman, Morgan Blake, Fred Bodeker, George Watkins, Fred Digby, and Blinkey Horn.

DJ = selected by Dick Jemison, sporting editor for the Atlanta Constitution.

MB = selected by Morgan Blake, sporting editor for the Atlanta Georgian.

FD = selected by Fred Digby, sporting editor for the New Orleans Item.

ZN = selected by Zipp Newman, assistant sporting editor for the Birmingham News.

HB = selected by "Happy" Barnes of Tulane University, in the New Orleans Item.

H = selected by John Heisman, coach of Georgia Institute of Technology.

FB = selected by Fred Bodeker of the Birmingham Age-Herald.

NT = selected by the Nashville Tennessean.

CM = selected by "Country" Morris, assistant coach at Clemson College.

HW = selected by former Sewanee player Henry Watkins.

GT = selected by the Technique, Georgia Tech's student newspaper. It had two players selected as "utility", denoted with a u.

HS = selected by Hugh Sparrow of the Nashville Banner.

== See also ==
- 1917 College Football All-America Team
