= James Gee =

James Gee may refer to:

- James Paul Gee (born 1948), American researcher
- Mutt Gee (James Gillian Gee, 1896–1982), American college football player and coach and college administrator
