= 1917 Mississippi A&M Aggies football team =

American college football season

1917 Mississippi A&M Aggies football
- Conference: Southern Intercollegiate Athletic Association
- Record: 6–1 (3–1 SIAA)
- Head coach: Stanley L. Robinson (1st season)
- Home stadium: New Athletic Field

1917 Southern Intercollegiate Athletic Association football standings
	Conf.					Overall
Team	W		L		T	W		L		T
Georgia Tech $	4	–	0	–	0	9	–	0	–	0
Auburn	5	–	1	–	0	6	–	2	–	1
Clemson	5	–	1	–	0	6	–	2	–	0
Centre	1	–	0	–	0	7	–	1	–	0
Mississippi A&M	3	–	1	–	0	6	–	1	–	0
Alabama	3	–	1	–	1	5	–	2	–	1
Sewanee	4	–	2	–	1	5	–	2	–	1
Tulane	2	–	1	–	0	5	–	3	–	0
Vanderbilt	3	–	2	–	0	5	–	3	–	0
LSU	2	–	3	–	0	3	–	5	–	0
South Carolina	2	–	3	–	0	3	–	5	–	0
Wofford	1	–	2	–	0	5	–	4	–	0
Furman	1	–	3	–	0	3	–	5	–	0
Florida	1	–	3	–	0	2	–	4	–	0
Ole Miss	1	–	4	–	0	1	–	4	–	1
Howard (AL)	0	–	2	–	1	3	–	3	–	1
The Citadel	0	–	2	–	0	3	–	3	–	0
Mississippi College	0	–	4	–	0	0	–	5	–	0
$ – Conference champion; There were several SIAA schools that did not field a team due to World War I.

The 1917 Mississippi A&M Aggies football team represented The Agricultural and Mechanical College of the State of Mississippi (now known as Mississippi State University) as a member of the Southern Intercollegiate Athletic Association (SIAA) during the 1917 college football season. Led by first-year head coach Stanley L. Robinson, the Aggies compiled an overall record of 6–1, with a mark of 3–1 in conference play. Mississippi A&M played home games at the New Athletic Field in Starkville, Mississippi.

== Schedule ==
Date	Opponent	Site	Result	Attendance	Source
October 5	Marion*	New Athletic Field; Starkville, MS	W 19–6		
October 13	Mississippi College	New Athletic Field; Starkville, MS	W 68–0		
October 27	at Auburn	Rickwood Field; Birmingham, AL	L 6–13		
November 3	vs. Ole Miss	Tupelo, MS (rivalry)	W 41–14	1,000	
November 10	Kentucky*	New Athletic Field; Starkville, MS	W 14–0		
November 17	at LSU	State Field; Baton Rouge, LA (rivalry)	W 9–0		
November 29	vs. Haskell*	Russwood Park; Memphis, TN	W 7–6		
*Non-conference game
