= 1917 The Citadel Bulldogs football team =

American college football season

1917 The Citadel Bulldogs football
- Conference: Southern Intercollegiate Athletic Association
- Record: 3–3 (0–2 SIAA)
- Head coach: Harry J. O'Brien (2nd season)
- Home stadium: College Park Stadium

1917 Southern Intercollegiate Athletic Association football standings
	Conf.					Overall
Team	W		L		T	W		L		T
Georgia Tech $	4	–	0	–	0	9	–	0	–	0
Auburn	5	–	1	–	0	6	–	2	–	1
Clemson	5	–	1	–	0	6	–	2	–	0
Centre	1	–	0	–	0	7	–	1	–	0
Mississippi A&M	3	–	1	–	0	6	–	1	–	0
Alabama	3	–	1	–	1	5	–	2	–	1
Sewanee	4	–	2	–	1	5	–	2	–	1
Tulane	2	–	1	–	0	5	–	3	–	0
Vanderbilt	3	–	2	–	0	5	–	3	–	0
LSU	2	–	3	–	0	3	–	5	–	0
South Carolina	2	–	3	–	0	3	–	5	–	0
Wofford	1	–	2	–	0	5	–	4	–	0
Furman	1	–	3	–	0	3	–	5	–	0
Florida	1	–	3	–	0	2	–	4	–	0
Ole Miss	1	–	4	–	0	1	–	4	–	1
Howard (AL)	0	–	2	–	1	3	–	3	–	1
The Citadel	0	–	2	–	0	3	–	3	–	0
Mississippi College	0	–	4	–	0	0	–	5	–	0
$ – Conference champion; There were several SIAA schools that did not field a team due to World War I.

The 1917 The Citadel Bulldogs football team represented The Citadel, The Military College of South Carolina in the 1917 college football season. Harry J. O'Brien served as coach for the second season. The Bulldogs played as members of the Southern Intercollegiate Athletic Association and played home games at College Park Stadium in Hampton Park.

== Schedule ==
Date	Opponent	Site	Result	Source
October 6	Charleston Navy*	College Park Stadium; Charleston, SC	W 19–7	
October 13	Presbyterian*	College Park Stadium; Charleston, SC	L 0–7	
October 20	Erskine*	College Park Stadium; Charleston, SC	W 18–7	
October 27	Newberry*	College Park Stadium; Charleston, SC	W 32–7	
November 8	vs. Clemson	County Fairgrounds; Orangeburg, SC	L 0–20	
November 29	at South Carolina	Davis Field; Columbia, SC	L 0–20	
*Non-conference game
