= 1917 Ole Miss Rebels football team =

American college football season

1917 Ole Miss Rebels football
- Conference: Southern Intercollegiate Athletic Association
- Record: 1–4–1 (1–4 SIAA)
- Head coach: Dudy Noble (1st season)
- Home stadium: Hemingway Stadium

1917 Southern Intercollegiate Athletic Association football standings
	Conf.					Overall
Team	W		L		T	W		L		T
Georgia Tech $	4	–	0	–	0	9	–	0	–	0
Auburn	5	–	1	–	0	6	–	2	–	1
Clemson	5	–	1	–	0	6	–	2	–	0
Centre	1	–	0	–	0	7	–	1	–	0
Mississippi A&M	3	–	1	–	0	6	–	1	–	0
Alabama	3	–	1	–	1	5	–	2	–	1
Sewanee	4	–	2	–	1	5	–	2	–	1
Tulane	2	–	1	–	0	5	–	3	–	0
Vanderbilt	3	–	2	–	0	5	–	3	–	0
LSU	2	–	3	–	0	3	–	5	–	0
South Carolina	2	–	3	–	0	3	–	5	–	0
Wofford	1	–	2	–	0	5	–	4	–	0
Furman	1	–	3	–	0	3	–	5	–	0
Florida	1	–	3	–	0	2	–	4	–	0
Ole Miss	1	–	4	–	0	1	–	4	–	1
Howard (AL)	0	–	2	–	1	3	–	3	–	1
The Citadel	0	–	2	–	0	3	–	3	–	0
Mississippi College	0	–	4	–	0	0	–	5	–	0
$ – Conference champion; There were several SIAA schools that did not field a team due to World War I.

The 1917 Ole Miss Rebels football team represented the University of Mississippi (Ole Miss) as a member of the Southern Intercollegiate Athletic Association (SIAA) during the 1917 college football season. Led by first-year head coach Dudy Noble, the Rebels compiled an overall record of 1–4–1, with a mark of 1–4 in conference play. Ole Miss played home games at Hemingway Stadium in Oxford, Mississippi.

== Schedule ==
Date	Opponent	Site	Result	Attendance	Source
October 6	Jonesboro Aggies*	Hemingway Stadium; Oxford, MS	T 0–0		
October 13	LSU	Hemingway Stadium; Oxford, MS (rivalry)	L 7–52		
October 26	at Alabama	University Field; Tuscaloosa, AL (rivalry)	L 0–64		
November 3	vs. Mississippi A&M	Fair Grounds; Tupelo, MS (rivalry)	L 14–41	1,000	
November 10	at Sewanee	Hardee Field; Sewanee, TN	L 7–69		
November 29	at Mississippi College	State Fairgrounds; Jackson, MS	W 21–0		
*Non-conference game
