= Leo DeTray =

American football and basketball coach (1888–1967)

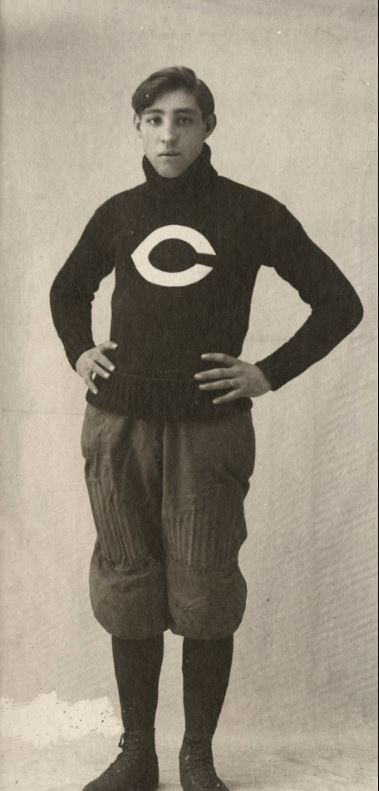

Biographical details
- Born: November 20, 1888 near Newark, Ohio, U.S.
- Died: October 9, 1967 (aged 83); San Pierre, Indiana, U.S.

Playing career

Football
- 1904–1907: Chicago
- Position: Halfback

Coaching career (HC unless noted)

Football
- 1908: Chicago (assistant)
- 1909–1910: Wittenberg
- 1911: Chicago (assistant)
- 1912: Ole Miss
- 1915–1916: Knox (IL)

Basketball
- 1915–1917: Knox (IL)

Head coaching record
- Overall: 10–7–2 (football); 10–10 (basketball)

Accomplishments and honors

Awards
- First-team All-Western (1907)

Leo Carter DeTray (November 20, 1888 – October 9, 1967) was an American football player and coach of football and basketball. He served as the head football at Wittenberg University in Springfield, Ohio in 1910, University of Mississippi (Ole Miss) in 1912 and at Knox College in Galesburg, Illinois from 1915 to 1916, compiling a career college football coaching record of 10–7–2. DeTray was also the head basketball coach at Knox from 1915 to 1917, tallying a mark of 10–10.

DeTray was a letterman at the University of Chicago competing as a halfback during his tenure with the Maroons between 1904 and 1907.

DeTray coached Wittenberg during the 1909 season. He began the 1910 season as the head football coach at Wittenberg, but was fired after losing his first two games and replaced by John B. Longwell. He served as the head football coach at the Ole Miss in 1912, where he compiled a record of 5–3 during his lone season.

DeTray later worked as a purchasing agent for an oil company based in Texas. He died on October 9, 1967, at the Little Company of Mary nursing home in San Pierre, Indiana.

== Head coaching record ==
=== Football ===
Year	Team	Overall	Conference	Standing	Bowl/playoffs
Wittenberg Tigers (Ohio Athletic Conference) (1910)
1910	Wittenberg	0–2 (Note: DeTray was fired after the first two games of the 1910 season. John B. Longwell replaced DeTray for the remainder of the season. Wittenberg finished the year 2–7 overall and 0–5 in Ohio Athletic Conference play, placing 11th.)	0–1		
Wittenberg:		0–2	0–1		
Ole Miss Rebels (Southern Intercollegiate Athletic Association) (1912)
1912	Ole Miss	5–3	2–2	11th	
Ole Miss:		5–3	2–2		
Knox Old Siwash (Independent) (1915–1916)
1915	Knox	1–1			
1916	Knox	4–1–2			
Knox:		5–2–2			
Total:		10–7–2			
