= 1917 Furman Baptists football team =

American college football season

1917 Furman Baptists football
- Conference: Southern Intercollegiate Athletic Association
- Record: 3–5 (1–3 SIAA)
- Head coach: Billy Laval (3rd season)
- Captain: Speedy Speer
- Home stadium: Riverside Park

1917 Southern Intercollegiate Athletic Association football standings
	Conf.					Overall
Team	W		L		T	W		L		T
Georgia Tech $	4	–	0	–	0	9	–	0	–	0
Auburn	5	–	1	–	0	6	–	2	–	1
Clemson	5	–	1	–	0	6	–	2	–	0
Centre	1	–	0	–	0	7	–	1	–	0
Mississippi A&M	3	–	1	–	0	6	–	1	–	0
Alabama	3	–	1	–	1	5	–	2	–	1
Sewanee	4	–	2	–	1	5	–	2	–	1
Tulane	2	–	1	–	0	5	–	3	–	0
Vanderbilt	3	–	2	–	0	5	–	3	–	0
LSU	2	–	3	–	0	3	–	5	–	0
South Carolina	2	–	3	–	0	3	–	5	–	0
Wofford	1	–	2	–	0	5	–	4	–	0
Furman	1	–	3	–	0	3	–	5	–	0
Florida	1	–	3	–	0	2	–	4	–	0
Ole Miss	1	–	4	–	0	1	–	4	–	1
Howard (AL)	0	–	2	–	1	3	–	3	–	1
The Citadel	0	–	2	–	0	3	–	3	–	0
Mississippi College	0	–	4	–	0	0	–	5	–	0
$ – Conference champion; There were several SIAA schools that did not field a team due to World War I.

The 1917 Furman Baptists football team represented Furman University during the 1917 Southern Intercollegiate Athletic Association football season. Led by third-year head coach Billy Laval, Furman compiled an overall record of 3–5 with a mark of 1–3 in SIAA play.

== Schedule ==
Date	Time	Opponent	Site	Result	Source
September 29		at Georgia Tech	Grant Field; Atlanta, GA	L 0–25	
October 6		Wake Forest*	Riverside Park; Greenville, SC	W 7–6	
October 13	3:30 p.m.	Clemson	Riverside Park; Greenville, SC	L 0–38	
October 20	3:30 p.m.	Newberry*	Riverside Park; Greenville, SC	W 20–7	
November 3		Davidson*	Riverside Park; Greenville, SC	L 7–28	
November 8		vs. South Carolina	Pee Dee Fair; Florence, SC	L 0–26	
November 17	3:30 p.m.	Presbyterian*	Greenville, SC	L 7–14	
November 29	3:00 p.m.	Wofford	Riverside Park; Greenville, SC (rivalry)	W 18–3	
*Non-conference game; All times are in Eastern time
