= Leslie Moser =

American football player and coach (1894–1969)

Biographical details
- Born: June 16, 1894; Scottdale, Pennsylvania, U.S.
- Died: January 1, 1969 (aged 74); Sebring, Florida, U.S.

Playing career
- 1912–1915: Washington & Jefferson
- Position: Center

Coaching career (HC unless noted)
- 1916–1917: Wofford

Administrative career (AD unless noted)
- 1916–1918: Wofford

Head coaching record
- Overall: 7–11

Leslie Moser (June 16, 1894 – January 1, 1969) was an American college football player and coach. He was the head football coach at Wofford College from 1916 to 1917, compiling a record of 7–11. Moser played college football at Washington & Jefferson University.

== Head coaching record ==
Year	Team	Overall	Conference	Standing	Bowl/playoffs
Wofford Terriers (Southern Intercollegiate Athletic Association) (1916–1917)
1916	Wofford	2–7	1–2	T–16th	
1917	Wofford	5–4	1–2	12th	
Wofford:		7–11	2–4		
Total:		7–11			
