= 1917 Alabama Crimson Tide football team =

American college football season

1917 Alabama Crimson Tide football
- Conference: Southern Intercollegiate Athletic Association
- Record: 5–2–1 (3–1–1 SIAA)
- Head coach: Thomas Kelley (3rd season)
- Captain: Jack Hovater
- Home stadium: University Field; Rickwood Field; Soldiers Field

1917 Southern Intercollegiate Athletic Association football standings
	Conf.					Overall
Team	W		L		T	W		L		T
Georgia Tech $	4	–	0	–	0	9	–	0	–	0
Auburn	5	–	1	–	0	6	–	2	–	1
Clemson	5	–	1	–	0	6	–	2	–	0
Centre	1	–	0	–	0	7	–	1	–	0
Mississippi A&M	3	–	1	–	0	6	–	1	–	0
Alabama	3	–	1	–	1	5	–	2	–	1
Sewanee	4	–	2	–	1	5	–	2	–	1
Tulane	2	–	1	–	0	5	–	3	–	0
Vanderbilt	3	–	2	–	0	5	–	3	–	0
LSU	2	–	3	–	0	3	–	5	–	0
South Carolina	2	–	3	–	0	3	–	5	–	0
Wofford	1	–	2	–	0	5	–	4	–	0
Furman	1	–	3	–	0	3	–	5	–	0
Florida	1	–	3	–	0	2	–	4	–	0
Ole Miss	1	–	4	–	0	1	–	4	–	1
Howard (AL)	0	–	2	–	1	3	–	3	–	1
The Citadel	0	–	2	–	0	3	–	3	–	0
Mississippi College	0	–	4	–	0	0	–	5	–	0
$ – Conference champion; There were several SIAA schools that did not field a team due to World War I.

The 1917 Alabama Crimson Tide football team (variously "Alabama", "UA" or "Bama") represented the University of Alabama in the 1917 college football season. It was the Crimson Tide's 25th overall and 22nd season as a member of the Southern Intercollegiate Athletic Association (SIAA). The team was led by head coach Thomas Kelley, in his third year, and played their home games at University Field in Tuscaloosa, at Rickwood Field in Birmingham and at Soldiers Field in Montgomery, Alabama. They finished the season with a record of five wins, two losses and one tie (5–2–1 overall, 3–1–1 in the SIAA).

Alabama's 1917 season opener against the "Second Ambulance Company of Ohio" at Soldiers Field in Montgomery was the only game the Crimson Tide ever played at that location. The 2nd, which was part of the 37th Division training in Montgomery, only got two first downs.

Alabama opened the season with four consecutive, shutout victories over the Second Ambulance Company, Marion Military Institute, Mississippi College and Ole Miss. In those four games, Alabama outscored their opponents by a margin of 130 to 0. After a tie against Sewanee and a loss to Vanderbilt at Rickwood Field, Alabama won their only road game at Kentucky.

In the season finale, Camp Gordon, the second military opponent Alabama faced as the country mobilized for World War I, beat the Tide 19–6. Camp Gordon had several players with college experience, including Adrian Van de Graaff, formerly of Alabama.

Joe Sewell, who went on to a Hall of Fame baseball career with the Cleveland Indians and New York Yankees, lettered in football for Alabama in 1917, 1918 and 1919.

== Schedule ==
Date	Opponent	Site	Result	Source
October 3	Second Ambulance Company of Ohio*	Soldiers Field; Montgomery, AL	W 7–0	
October 6	Birmingham*	University Field; Tuscaloosa, AL	Canceled	
October 12	Marion*	University Field; Tuscaloosa, AL	W 13–0	
October 20	Mississippi College	University Field; Tuscaloosa, AL	W 46–0	
October 26	Ole Miss	University Field; Tuscaloosa, AL (rivalry)	W 64–0	
November 3	Sewanee	Rickwood Field; Birmingham, AL	T 3–3	
November 10	Vanderbilt	Rickwood Field; Birmingham, AL	L 2–7	
November 17	at Kentucky	Stoll Field; Lexington, KY	W 27–0	
November 29	Camp Gordon*	Rickwood Field; Birmingham, AL	L 6–19	
*Non-conference game

== Personnel ==
=== Varsity letter winners ===
Player	Hometown	Position
Robert C. Brown	Ensley, Alabama	Back
Elmer Blair	Birmingham, Alabama	Back
Alfred M. Boone	Samantha, Alabama	End
James H. “Dink” Hagan	Mobile, Alabama	Quarterback
Walter E. Hovater	Russellville, Alabama	Back
Ralph Lee Jones	Jones Mills, Alabama	Guard
Mullie Lenoir	Marlin, Texas	Halfback
Joseph Allen Lowman	Birmingham, Alabama	End
John Phillip Noland	Tuscaloosa, Alabama	
Ike Rogers	Vina, Alabama	Tackle
Tram Sessions	Birmingham, Alabama	Center
Joe Sewell	Titus, Alabama	Halfback
Riggs Stephenson	Akron, Alabama	Fullback
Max Frederick Stowers	Attalla, Alabama	Quarterback
C. S. Whittlesley	Opelika, Alabama	Guard

=== Coaching staff ===
Name	Position	Seasons at Alabama	Alma mater
Thomas Kelly	Head coach	3	
