= 1917 Wofford Terriers football team =

American college football season

1917 Wofford Terriers football
- Conference: Southern Intercollegiate Athletic Association
- Record: 5–4 (1–2 SIAA)
- Head coach: Leslie Moser (2nd season)

1917 Southern Intercollegiate Athletic Association football standings
	Conf.					Overall
Team	W		L		T	W		L		T
Georgia Tech $	4	–	0	–	0	9	–	0	–	0
Auburn	5	–	1	–	0	6	–	2	–	1
Clemson	5	–	1	–	0	6	–	2	–	0
Centre	1	–	0	–	0	7	–	1	–	0
Mississippi A&M	3	–	1	–	0	6	–	1	–	0
Alabama	3	–	1	–	1	5	–	2	–	1
Sewanee	4	–	2	–	1	5	–	2	–	1
Tulane	2	–	1	–	0	5	–	3	–	0
Vanderbilt	3	–	2	–	0	5	–	3	–	0
LSU	2	–	3	–	0	3	–	5	–	0
South Carolina	2	–	3	–	0	3	–	5	–	0
Wofford	1	–	2	–	0	5	–	4	–	0
Furman	1	–	3	–	0	3	–	5	–	0
Florida	1	–	3	–	0	2	–	4	–	0
Ole Miss	1	–	4	–	0	1	–	4	–	1
Howard (AL)	0	–	2	–	1	3	–	3	–	1
The Citadel	0	–	2	–	0	3	–	3	–	0
Mississippi College	0	–	4	–	0	0	–	5	–	0
$ – Conference champion; There were several SIAA schools that did not field a team due to World War I.

The 1917 Wofford Terriers football team represented Wofford College as a member the Southern Intercollegiate Athletic Association (SIAA) during the 1917 college football season. Led by second-year head coach Leslie Moser, the team compiled an overall record of 5–4, with a mark of 1–2 in conference play.

== Schedule ==
Date	Opponent	Site	Result	Source
October 6	Guilford*	Spartanburg, SC	W 20–0	
October 13	New York Ambulance Corps*	Wofford Park; Spartanburg, SC	W 21–0	
October 20	Presbyterian*	Spartanburg, SC	L 6–7	
October 26	Erskine*	Spartanburg, SC	W 21–0	
November 1	Clemson	Spartanburg, SC	L 16–27	
November 9	at Newberry*	Newberry, SC	W 45–0	
November 17	South Carolina	Spartanburg Fairgrounds; Spartanburg, SC	W 20–0	
November 23	at Davidson*	Sprunt Field; Davidson, NC	L 0–62	
November 29	at Furman	Riverside Park; Greenville, SC (rivalry)	L 3–18	
*Non-conference game
