= Otto Colee =

American football player (1895–1969)

Profile
- Position: Fullback

Personal information
- Born: December 4, 1895; Audubon, Iowa
- Died: August 10, 1969 (aged 73); Osyka, Mississippi

Career information
- College: Tulane (1917–1918)

Awards and highlights
- All-Southern (1917)

Otto Leonard Colee (December 4, 1895 – August 10, 1969) was a college football player and dental surgeon. A star guard and fullback for the Tulane Green Wave, he was All-Southern in 1917, captain in 1918.
