= John B. Longwell =

American football and basketball coach (1879–1952)

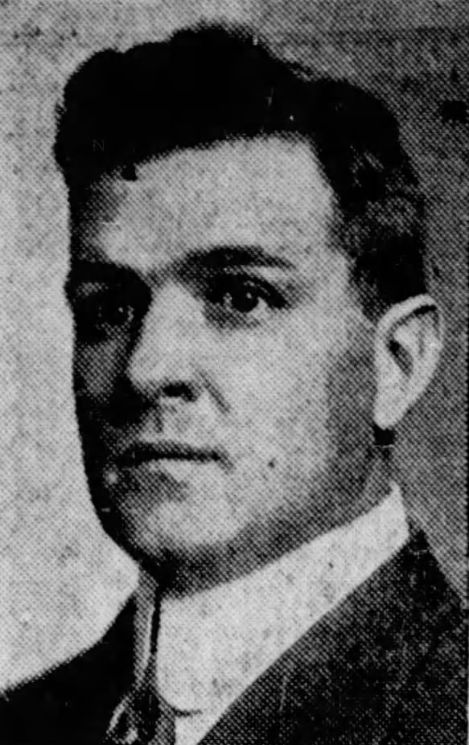
- Longwell pictured in the Springfield News-Sun, 1910

Biographical details
- Born: October 23, 1879; New Windsor, New York, U.S.
- Died: May 18, 1952 (aged 72)

Playing career

Football
- 1902: Washington & Jefferson
- 1905–1906: Penn
- Positions: Fullback, halfback

Coaching career (HC unless noted)

Football
- 1909: Howard (AL)
- 1910: Wittenberg
- 1911: Howard (AL)
- 1916–1917: Howard (AL)
- 1919: NYU

Basketball
- 1916–1917: Howard (AL)

Administrative career (AD unless noted)
- 1916–1917: Howard (AL)

Head coaching record
- Overall: 20–22–3 (football); 3–5 (basketball)

John Burt Longwell (October 23, 1879 – May 18, 1952) was an American college football player and coach, college basketball coach, and dentist. He served as the head football coach at Howard College—now Samford University—in Birmingham, Alabama during the 1909, 1911, 1916 and 1917 seasons and at New York University (NYU) in 1919. Longwell was also the head basketball coach at Howard during the 1916–17 season, tallying a mark of 3–5.

Longwell was hired as Howard College coach in 1909. His first football team went 5–2–1 and outscored opponents 82 to 30 over eight games. James C. Donnelly coached the next season. During the 1910 season, he served as an interim coach at Wittenberg College in Springfield, Ohio after the ousting of head coach Leo DeTray. When Longwell returned to Howard the following season, the 1–6–1 1911 Bulldogs only managed six points to their opponents' 158 in an eight-game season. B. L. Noojin coached the next three seasons, succeeded by Eugene Caton in 1915. Longwell returned in 1916 and guided the Bulldogs to a 6–4 record (146 points scored to 92 points against). He coached the first five games of the next season before resigning. C. W. Streit completed the 3–3–1 season. His overall record with the Bulldogs was 14–14–3 in 31 games.

Longwell was a graduate of the dental department at the University of Pennsylvania, class of 1909. He later worked as a dentist in New York.

== Head coaching record ==
=== Football ===
Year	Team	Overall	Conference	Standing	Bowl/playoffs
Howard Crimson and Blue (Southern Intercollegiate Athletic Association) (1909)
1909	Howard	5–2–1	2–2		
Wittenberg Tigers (Ohio Athletic Conference) (1910)
1910	Wittenberg	2–4 (Note: Leo DeTray served as Wittenberg's head coach for the first two games of the 1910 season before he was fired. Longwell replaced DeTray for the remainder of the season. Wittenberg finished the year 2–7 overall and 0–5 in conference play.)	0–4	11th	
Wittenberg:		2–4	0–4		
Howard Baptists (Southern Intercollegiate Athletic Association) (1911)
1911	Howard	1–6–1	0–6–1		
Howard Bulldogs (Southern Intercollegiate Athletic Association) (1916–1917)
1916	Howard	6–4	1–1		
1917	Howard	2–2–1 (Note: Longwell coached only the first five games of the season. C. W. Streit coached the final two games of the season.)	0–2–1		
Howard:		14–14–3	3–11–2		
NYU Violets (Independent) (1919)
1919	NYU	4–4			
NYU:		4–4			
Total:		20–22–3			
