= 1917 Florida Gators football team =

American college football season

1917 Florida Gators football
- Conference: Southern Intercollegiate Athletic Association
- Record: 2–4 (1–3 SIAA)
- Head coach: Alfred L. Buser (1st season)
- Captains: Artie Fuller; Rowdy Bill Wilkinson
- Home stadium: Fleming Field

1917 Southern Intercollegiate Athletic Association football standings
	Conf.					Overall
Team	W		L		T	W		L		T
Georgia Tech $	4	–	0	–	0	9	–	0	–	0
Auburn	5	–	1	–	0	6	–	2	–	1
Clemson	5	–	1	–	0	6	–	2	–	0
Centre	1	–	0	–	0	7	–	1	–	0
Mississippi A&M	3	–	1	–	0	6	–	1	–	0
Alabama	3	–	1	–	1	5	–	2	–	1
Sewanee	4	–	2	–	1	5	–	2	–	1
Tulane	2	–	1	–	0	5	–	3	–	0
Vanderbilt	3	–	2	–	0	5	–	3	–	0
LSU	2	–	3	–	0	3	–	5	–	0
South Carolina	2	–	3	–	0	3	–	5	–	0
Wofford	1	–	2	–	0	5	–	4	–	0
Furman	1	–	3	–	0	3	–	5	–	0
Florida	1	–	3	–	0	2	–	4	–	0
Ole Miss	1	–	4	–	0	1	–	4	–	1
Howard (AL)	0	–	2	–	1	3	–	3	–	1
The Citadel	0	–	2	–	0	3	–	3	–	0
Mississippi College	0	–	4	–	0	0	–	5	–	0
$ – Conference champion; There were several SIAA schools that did not field a team due to World War I.

The 1917 Florida Gators football team represented the University of Florida during the 1917 college football season. The season was Alfred L. Buser's first of three as the head coach of the Florida Gators football team. The 1917 season was a disappointment; the team completed their football season with an SIAA conference record of 1–3 and an overall record of 2–4.

== Before the season ==
Coach Buser was a former All-American lineman for the Wisconsin Badgers, and promised to bring a Midwestern power football style of play to revive the Gators after the winless 1916 season. Captain "Rowdy Bill" Wilkinson was the team's only returning letterman.

== Schedule ==
Date	Opponent	Site	Result	Source
October 13	South Carolina	Fleming Field; Gainesville, FL	W 21–13	
October 20	Tulane	Fleming Field; Gainesville, FL	L 0–52	
October 27	Southern College*	Fleming Field; Gainesville, FL	W 19–7	
November 3	at Auburn	Drake Field; Auburn, AL (rivalry)	L 0–68	
November 17	vs. Clemson	Barrs Field; Jacksonville, FL	L 7–55	
November 29	at Kentucky*	Stoll Field; Lexington, KY (rivalry)	L 0–52	
*Non-conference game

== Game summaries ==
=== South Carolina ===
South Carolina at Florida

Team	1	2	3	4	Total
South Carolina	0	7	0	6	13
• Florida	0	0	21	0	21

- Date: October 13
- Location: Gainesville, FL
- Referee: Street (W&L)

On opening day, Florida came from behind with three touchdowns in the third quarter to beat South Carolina 21–13.

The starting lineup was Clemmons (left end), Wurtrich (left tackle), Connell (left guard), Wells (center), Swink (right guard), Brannon (right tackle), Thomas (right end), Fuller (quarterback), Wilkinson (left halfback), Ball (right halfback), Lightsey (fullback).

=== Tulane ===
Tulane at Florida

Team	1	2	3	4	Total
• Tulane	7	20	18	6	51
Florida	0	0	0	0	0

- Date: October 20
- Location: Gainesville, FL
- Referee: John Counselman

Tulane overwhelmed the Gators 52–0, several times skirting the ends for long gains. The Gators were frequently penalized for offsides and hurdling.

The starting lineup was Clemmons (left end), Wurtrich (left tackle), Connell (left guard), Wells (center), Otto (right guard), Brannon (right tackle), Thomas (right end), Fuller (quarterback), Wilkinson (left halfback), Ball (right halfback), Lightsey (fullback).

=== Southern College ===
Southern College at Florida

Team	1	2	3	4	Total
Southern College	0	0	7	0	7
• Florida	6	0	6	7	19

- Date: October 27
- Location: Gainesville, FL
- Referee: Ted Arnold

The Gators extended their winning streak over the Southern College to four games, winning 19–7. After the first ten minutes, Florida replaced its backfield with second-string men.

The starting lineup was Clemmons (left end), Wutrich (left tackle), Swink (left guard), Dye (center), Cornell (right guard), Brannon (right tackle), Thomas (right end), Fuller (quarterback), Marshall (left halfback), Leifeste (right halfback), Lightsey (fullback).

=== Auburn ===
Florida at Auburn

Team	1	2	3	4	Total
Florida	0	0	0	0	0
• Auburn	14	19	21	14	68

- Date: November 6
- Location: Auburn, AL
- Referee: Tom Dutton

Florida endured its sixth-straight loss to coach Mike Donahue's Auburn team. The Plainsmen had their biggest win on the season over Florida, 68–0.

The starting lineup was Clemmons (left end), Wutrich (left tackle), Connell (left guard), Dye (center), Otto (right guard), Brannon (right tackle), Thomas (right end), Fuller (quarterback), Wilkinson (left halfback), Ball (right halfback), Fernald (fullback).

=== Clemson ===
Clemson at Florida

Team	1	2	3	4	Total
• Clemson	21	7	20	7	55
Florida	0	0	0	7	7

- Date: November 17
- Location: Barrs Field
  Jacksonville, FL
- Referee: Streit (Auburn)

Clemson defeated the Gators 55–7. Florida's only score came on a forward pass, Loomis to Thomas.

The starting lineup was Clemmons (left end), Wutrich (left tackle), Connell (left guard), Dye (center), Otto (right guard), Brannon (right tackle), Thomas (right end), Loomis (quarterback), Wilkinson (left halfback), Ball (right halfback), Lightsey (fullback).

=== Kentucky ===
Florida at Kentucky

Team	1	2	3	4	Total
Florida	0	0	0	0	0
• Kentucky	13	13	20	6	52

- Date: November 29
- Location: Stoll Field
  Lexington, KY
- Referee: Swain (Dickerson)

On Thanksgiving, in the school's first-ever game against the Kentucky Wildcats, Florida lost 52–0. Kentucky used its substitutes by the second half.

The starting lineup was Clemmons (left end), Wuthrich (left tackle), Connell (left guard), Dye (center), Gunn (right guard), Brannon (right tackle), Thomas (right end), Loomis (quarterback), Wilkinson (left halfback), Ball (right halfback), Fernald (fullback).

== Personnel ==
=== Line ===
Player	Position	Games started	Hometown	Prep school	Height	Weight	Age
Cutie Brannon	Tackle	6	Gainesville		5'7"	170	21
Gordon Clemmons	End	6	Plant City		5'10"	140	19
Harvey Connell	Guard	6	Orlando		6'0"	180	19
Colonel Dye	Center	4	Bradentown		5'11"	170	19
Rat Paul Hayman	End		Punta Gorda		5'7"	150	21
P. C. Swink	Guard, tackle	2	Spartanburg, SC		5'10"	155	20
Clarence Thomas	End	6	Gainesville		5'11"	160	18
Fats Wuthrich	Tackle	6	Brewster		5'8"	170	20

=== Backfield ===
Player	Position	Games started	Hometown	Prep school	Height	Weight	Age
Heinie Ball	Halfback	5	Sanford		5'5"	155	20
Billy Canova	Quarterback		Lake City		5'6"	150	19
Fernie Fernald	Fullback	2	Tarpon Springs		5'9"	155	18
Horace Loomis	Quarterback	2	Plant City		5'9"	135	19
Alf Marshall	Halfback	1	Clearwater		5'7"	145	21
Rowdy Bill Wilkinson	Halfback	5	Gainesville		5'8"	145	25

=== Coaching staff ===
- Head coach: Al Buser
- Manager: W. E. Stone
- Assistant managers: E. B. Casler, J. W. Dalton

== Bibliography ==
- University of Florida (1918). The Seminole. Vol. 9.
