= 1917 Louisiana Industrial football team =

American college football season

1917 Louisiana Industrial football
- Conference: Louisiana Intercollegiate Athletic Association
- Record: 2–3 (0–2 LIAA)
- Head coach: Villis Stephen Pugh (1st season)

The 1917 Louisiana Industrial football team was an American football team that represented the Louisiana Industrial Institute—now known as Louisiana Tech University—as a member of the Louisiana Intercollegiate Athletic Association (LIAA) during the 1917 college football season. Led by Villis Stephen Pugh in his first and only season as head coach, Louisiana Industrial compiled an overall record of 2–3.

== Schedule ==
Date	Opponent	Site	Result	Source
	St. Charles (LA)	Ruston, LA	W 43–7	
November 3	Louisiana Normal	State Fair Grounds; Shreveport, LA (rivalry)	L 0–7	
November 10	Henderson-Brown*	Ruston, LA	W 19–13	
November 17	Southwestern Louisiana Industrial	Ruston, LA (rivalry)	L 0–57	
November 29	at Ouachita Baptist*	Arkadelphia, AR	L 10–54	
*Non-conference game
