= 1917 Howard Baptists football team =

American college football season

1917 Howard Baptists football
- Conference: Southern Intercollegiate Athletic Association
- Record: 3–3–1 (0–2–1 SIAA)
- Head coach: John B. Longwell (4th season; first 5 games); C. W. Streit (1st season, last 2 games)
- Home stadium: Howard Athletic Field; Rickwood Field

1917 Southern Intercollegiate Athletic Association football standings
	Conf.					Overall
Team	W		L		T	W		L		T
Georgia Tech $	4	–	0	–	0	9	–	0	–	0
Auburn	5	–	1	–	0	6	–	2	–	1
Clemson	5	–	1	–	0	6	–	2	–	0
Centre	1	–	0	–	0	7	–	1	–	0
Mississippi A&M	3	–	1	–	0	6	–	1	–	0
Alabama	3	–	1	–	1	5	–	2	–	1
Sewanee	4	–	2	–	1	5	–	2	–	1
Tulane	2	–	1	–	0	5	–	3	–	0
Vanderbilt	3	–	2	–	0	5	–	3	–	0
LSU	2	–	3	–	0	3	–	5	–	0
South Carolina	2	–	3	–	0	3	–	5	–	0
Wofford	1	–	2	–	0	5	–	4	–	0
Furman	1	–	3	–	0	3	–	5	–	0
Florida	1	–	3	–	0	2	–	4	–	0
Ole Miss	1	–	4	–	0	1	–	4	–	1
Howard (AL)	0	–	2	–	1	3	–	3	–	1
The Citadel	0	–	2	–	0	3	–	3	–	0
Mississippi College	0	–	4	–	0	0	–	5	–	0
$ – Conference champion; There were several SIAA schools that did not field a team due to World War I.

The 1917 Howard Baptists football team was an American football team that represented Howard College (now known as the Samford University) as a member of the Southern Intercollegiate Athletic Association (SIAA) during the 1917 college football season. The team compiled an 3–3–1 record, with John B. Longwell going 2–2–1 through the first five games and C. W. Streit going 1–1 for the final two games of the season.

== Schedule ==
Date	Time	Opponent	Site	Result	Source
September 29		Blountsville Aggies*	Howard Athletic Field; Birmingham, AL	W 19–0	
October 6		at Sewanee	Hardee Field; Sewanee, TN	T 6–6	
October 13		at Auburn	Drake Field; Auburn, AL	L 0–53	
October 20		Marion*	Rickwood Field; Birmingham, AL	W 12–7	
October 27		at Vanderbilt	Dudley Field; Nashville, TN	L 0–69	
November 9		at Acipco YMCA*	Birmingham, AL	W 31–0	
November 29	2:40 p.m.	at Spring Hill*	Monroe Field; Mobile, AL	L 7–12	
*Non-conference game; All times are in Central time
