= 1917 Vanderbilt Commodores football team =

American college football season

1917 Vanderbilt Commodores football
- Conference: Southern Intercollegiate Athletic Association
- Record: 5–3 (3–2 SIAA)
- Head coach: Dan McGugin (14th season)
- Offensive scheme: Short punt
- Captain: Alfred T. Adams
- Home stadium: Dudley Field

1917 Southern Intercollegiate Athletic Association football standings
	Conf.					Overall
Team	W		L		T	W		L		T
Georgia Tech $	4	–	0	–	0	9	–	0	–	0
Auburn	5	–	1	–	0	6	–	2	–	1
Clemson	5	–	1	–	0	6	–	2	–	0
Centre	1	–	0	–	0	7	–	1	–	0
Mississippi A&M	3	–	1	–	0	6	–	1	–	0
Alabama	3	–	1	–	1	5	–	2	–	1
Sewanee	4	–	2	–	1	5	–	2	–	1
Tulane	2	–	1	–	0	5	–	3	–	0
Vanderbilt	3	–	2	–	0	5	–	3	–	0
LSU	2	–	3	–	0	3	–	5	–	0
South Carolina	2	–	3	–	0	3	–	5	–	0
Wofford	1	–	2	–	0	5	–	4	–	0
Furman	1	–	3	–	0	3	–	5	–	0
Florida	1	–	3	–	0	2	–	4	–	0
Ole Miss	1	–	4	–	0	1	–	4	–	1
Howard (AL)	0	–	2	–	1	3	–	3	–	1
The Citadel	0	–	2	–	0	3	–	3	–	0
Mississippi College	0	–	4	–	0	0	–	5	–	0
$ – Conference champion; There were several SIAA schools that did not field a team due to World War I.

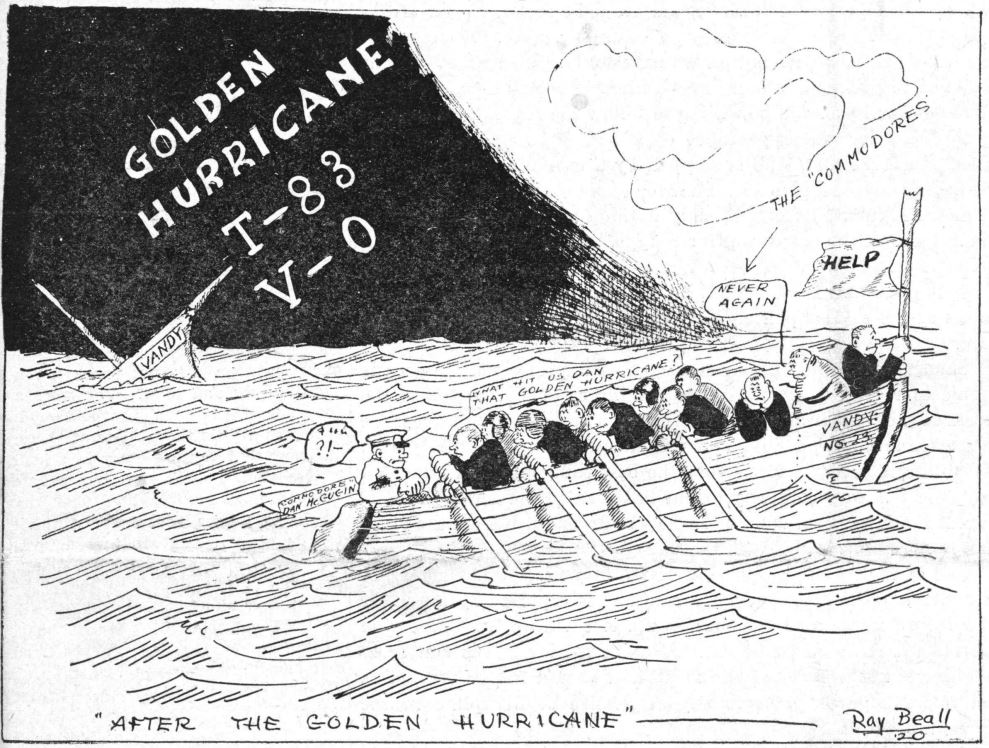
Cartoon published in the Technique following Vanderbilt's loss to Georgia Tech

The 1917 Vanderbilt Commodores football team represented Vanderbilt University in the 1917 college football season. The 1917 season was Dan McGugin's 14th year as head coach.

The south's first national champion Georgia Tech gave Vanderbilt its biggest loss in school history, 83 to 0. Vandy captain Alfred T. Adams praised the Tech team: "Tech's magnificent machine won easily over Vanderbilt. It was simply the matter of a splendid eleven winning over an unseasoned, inexperienced team. "Tech played hard, clean football, and we were somewhat surprised to meet such a fair, aggressive team, after the reports we had heard. I think that Vanderbilt could have broken that Tech shift if we had had last year's eleven. Being outweighed, Vanderbilt could not check the heavy forwards, or open up the line. Thereby hangs the tale."

== Schedule ==
Date	Opponent	Site	Result	Source
October 6	Transylvania*	Dudley Field; Nashville, TN	W 41–0	
October 13	at Chicago*	Stagg Field; Chicago, IL	L 0–48	
October 20	at Kentucky*	Stoll Field; Lexington, KY (rivalry)	W 5–0	
October 27	Howard (AL)	Dudley Field; Nashville, TN	W 69–0	
November 3	at Georgia Tech	Grant Field; Atlanta, GA (rivalry)	L 0–83	
November 10	at Alabama	Rickwood Field; Birmingham, AL	W 7–2	
November 17	Auburn	Dudley Field; Nashville, TN	L 7–31	
November 29	Sewanee	Dudley Field; Nashville, TN (rivalry)	W 13–6	
*Non-conference game
