= Gene Davidson =

American football and baseball player (1896–1960)

Profile
- Position: Quarterback/Outfielder (baseball)

Personal information
- Born: February 19, 1896; Hon Township, Scott County, Arkansas, U.S.
- Died: September 12, 1960 (aged 64); Fort Smith, Arkansas, U.S.

Career information
- High school: Fort Smith
- College: Arkansas (1915–1919)

Awards and highlights
- All-Southern (1917); All-Southwest (1916, 1919); Arkansas' Greatest Athlete (1919); Arkansas Sports Hall of Fame

Gene "Sodie" Davidson (February 19, 1896 – September 12, 1960) was an American football and baseball player for the Arkansas Razorbacks of the University of Arkansas. He was inducted into the Arkansas Sports Hall of Fame in 1968. Davidson was named "Arkansas' Greatest Athlete" in 1919.

== Early life ==
Gene Davidson was born on February 19, 1896, in Hon Township of Scott County, Arkansas to Joe Davidson and Susan Ivey.
