= 1917 Sewanee Tigers football team =

American college football season

1917 Sewanee Tigers football
- Conference: Southern Intercollegiate Athletic Association
- Record: 5–2–1 (4–1–1 SIAA)
- Head coach: Charles Best (1st season)
- Captain: Eben Wortham
- Home stadium: Hardee Field

1917 Southern Intercollegiate Athletic Association football standings
	Conf.					Overall
Team	W		L		T	W		L		T
Georgia Tech $	4	–	0	–	0	9	–	0	–	0
Auburn	5	–	1	–	0	6	–	2	–	1
Clemson	5	–	1	–	0	6	–	2	–	0
Centre	1	–	0	–	0	7	–	1	–	0
Mississippi A&M	3	–	1	–	0	6	–	1	–	0
Alabama	3	–	1	–	1	5	–	2	–	1
Sewanee	4	–	2	–	1	5	–	2	–	1
Tulane	2	–	1	–	0	5	–	3	–	0
Vanderbilt	3	–	2	–	0	5	–	3	–	0
LSU	2	–	3	–	0	3	–	5	–	0
South Carolina	2	–	3	–	0	3	–	5	–	0
Wofford	1	–	2	–	0	5	–	4	–	0
Furman	1	–	3	–	0	3	–	5	–	0
Florida	1	–	3	–	0	2	–	4	–	0
Ole Miss	1	–	4	–	0	1	–	4	–	1
Howard (AL)	0	–	2	–	1	3	–	3	–	1
The Citadel	0	–	2	–	0	3	–	3	–	0
Mississippi College	0	–	4	–	0	0	–	5	–	0
$ – Conference champion; There were several SIAA schools that did not field a team due to World War I.

The 1917 Sewanee Tigers football team represented Sewanee: The University of the South during the 1917 college football season as a member of the Southern Intercollegiate Athletic Association (SIAA). The Tigers were led by head coach Charles Best in his first season and finished with a record of five wins, two losses, and one tie (5–2–1 overall, 4–1–1 in the SIAA).

== Schedule ==
Date	Time	Opponent	Site	Result	Source
October 6		Howard (AL)	Hardee Field; Sewanee, TN	T 6–6	
October 13	2:30 p.m.	vs. Transylvania*	Andrews Field; Chattanooga, TN	W 72–0	
October 20		vs. LSU	Heinemann Park; New Orleans, LA	W 3–0	
October 27	3:00 p.m.	vs. Kentucky	Andrews Field; Chattanooga, TN	W 7–0	
November 3		at Alabama	Rickwood Field; Birmingham, AL	T 3–3	
November 10		Ole Miss	Hardee Field; Sewanee, TN	W 69–7	
November 17	2:30 p.m.	vs. Centre*	Chamberlain Field; Chattanooga, TN	L 0–28	
November 29		at Vanderbilt	Dudley Field; Nashville, TN (rivalry)	L 6–13	
*Non-conference game
