= Mutt Gee =

American football player, coach, and administrator (1896–1982)

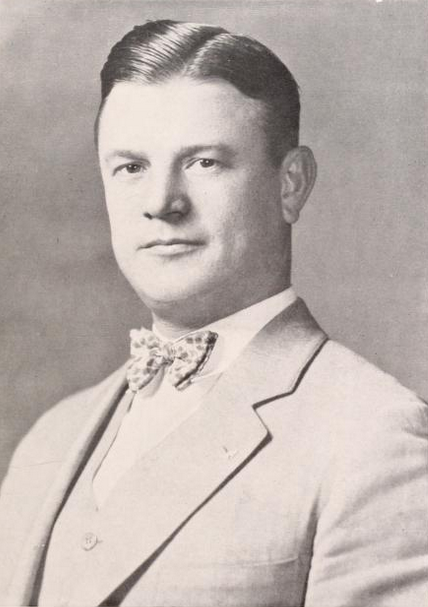
- Gee in 1928

Biographical details
- Born: August 20, 1896; Union County, South Carolina, U.S.
- Died: October 29, 1982 (aged 86); Huntsville, Texas, U.S.

Playing career

Football
- 1914–1917: Clemson

Baseball
- 1917: Clemson
- Position(s): Center, guard (football); Right fielder (baseball)

Coaching career (HC unless noted)

Football
- 1920–1922: Sam Houston State
- ?–1926: Florida (line)

Administrative career (AD unless noted)
- 1927–1930: Clemson

Head coaching record
- Overall: 6–7–4

Accomplishments and honors

Awards
- All-Southern (1917); Clemson Athletics Hall of Fame (1975)

James Gilliam "Mutt" Gee (August 20, 1896 – October 29, 1982) was an American college football player and coach and college administrator. Gee played college football at Clemson University as a center and was selected All-Southern in 1917. He also lettered in baseball at Clemson. Gee and Josh Cody were instrumental in building the Fike Recreation Center. Gee was inducted into the Clemson Athletics Hall of Fame in 1975.

Gee coached football at Sam Houston State University from 1920 to 1922, compiling a record of 6–7–4. He returned to his alma mater, Clemson in 1927 to serve as the school's athletic director. He later became the president at East Texas State University—now known as Texas A&M University–Commerce.

== Head coaching record ==
Year	Team	Overall	Conference	Standing	Bowl/playoffs
Sam Houston State Bearkats (Independent) (1920–1922)
1920	Sam Houston State	1–3–2			
1921	Sam Houston State	3–1–2			
1922	Sam Houston State	2–3			
Sam Houston State:		6–7–4			
Total:		6–7–4			
