= 1919 College Baseball All-Southern Team =

All-star college baseball team

The 1919 College Baseball All-Southern Team consists of baseball players selected at their respective positions after the 1919 NCAA baseball season.

== All-Southerns ==
Position	Name	School	Notes
Pitcher	Alfred M. Boone	Alabama	NJ, ST
Pitcher	Tom Philpott	Georgia	NJ, ST
Pitcher	George Johnston	Auburn	NJ, ST
Pitcher	Pepper	Mississippi A&M	NJ
Pitcher	Chief Turk	Oglethorpe	ST
Catcher	Lena Styles	Alabama	NJ, ST
First baseman	Julian Thomas	Vanderbilt	NJ
First baseman	Webb	Georgia Tech	ST
Second baseman	Joe Sewell	Alabama	NJ
Second baseman	Smith	Georgia Tech	ST
Third baseman	Whitey Davis	Georgia	NJ, ST
Shortstop	Riggs Stephenson	Alabama	NJ, ST
Outfielder	Claude Satterfield	Georgia	NJ, ST
Outfielder	Red Lenoir	Alabama	NJ, ST
Outfielder	Jackson	Howard	NJ
Utility	C. Morgan	Mercer	NJ, ST [as of]
Utility	J. V. Cranford	Georgia	ST

== Key ==
NJ = Lonnie Noojin's selections

ST = Herman Stegeman's selections.
