= Dixon Foster =

American sports coach (1888–1973)

Biographical details
- Born: December 24, 1888
- Died: May 6, 1973 (aged 84)

Playing career

Football
- 1905–1908: Hampden–Sydney

Coaching career (HC unless noted)

Football
- 1909–1910: Greenbrier Military (WV)
- 1912–1915: Porter Military (SC)
- 1916: South Carolina (freshmen)
- 1917: South Carolina
- 1919: South Carolina

Basketball
- 1916–1920: South Carolina

Baseball
- 1917–1920: South Carolina

Administrative career (AD unless noted)
- 1917: South Carolina
- 1919: South Carolina

Head coaching record
- Overall: 4–12–1 (college football); 26–31 (college basketball)

William Dixon Foster (December 24, 1888 – May 6, 1973) was an American football, basketball and baseball coach. He served as the head football coach (1917, 1919), head men's basketball coach (1916–1920) and head baseball coach (1917–1920) at the University of South Carolina.

Foster was a graduate of Hampden–Sydney College in Hampden Sydney, Virginia.

== Head coaching record ==
=== Football ===
Year	Team	Overall	Conference	Standing	Bowl/playoffs
South Carolina Gamecocks (Southern Intercollegiate Athletic Association) (1917)
1917	South Carolina	3–5	2–3	T–9th	
South Carolina Gamecocks (Southern Intercollegiate Athletic Association) (1919)
1919	South Carolina	1–7–1	0–4–1	20th	
South Carolina:		4–12–1	2–7–1		
Total:		4–12–1			
