= 1917 Auburn Tigers football team =

American college football season

1917 Auburn Tigers football
- Conference: Southern Intercollegiate Athletic Association
- Record: 6–2–1 (5–1 SIAA)
- Head coach: Mike Donahue (13th season)
- Base defense: 7–2–2
- Captain: Carey Robinson
- Home stadium: Drake Field; Rickwood Field

1917 Southern Intercollegiate Athletic Association football standings
| | Conf. | | | | | Overall |
| Team | W | | L | | T | W | | L | | T |
|---|---|---|---|---|---|---|---|---|---|---|
| Georgia Tech $ | 4 | – | 0 | – | 0 | 9 | – | 0 | – | 0 |
| Auburn | 5 | – | 1 | – | 0 | 6 | – | 2 | – | 1 |
| Clemson | 5 | – | 1 | – | 0 | 6 | – | 2 | – | 0 |
| Centre | 1 | – | 0 | – | 0 | 7 | – | 1 | – | 0 |
| Mississippi A&M | 3 | – | 1 | – | 0 | 6 | – | 1 | – | 0 |
| Alabama | 3 | – | 1 | – | 1 | 5 | – | 2 | – | 1 |
| Sewanee | 4 | – | 2 | – | 1 | 5 | – | 2 | – | 1 |
| Tulane | 2 | – | 1 | – | 0 | 5 | – | 3 | – | 0 |
| Vanderbilt | 3 | – | 2 | – | 0 | 5 | – | 3 | – | 0 |
| LSU | 2 | – | 3 | – | 0 | 3 | – | 5 | – | 0 |
| South Carolina | 2 | – | 3 | – | 0 | 3 | – | 5 | – | 0 |
| Wofford | 1 | – | 2 | – | 0 | 5 | – | 4 | – | 0 |
| Furman | 1 | – | 3 | – | 0 | 3 | – | 5 | – | 0 |
| Florida | 1 | – | 3 | – | 0 | 2 | – | 4 | – | 0 |
| Ole Miss | 1 | – | 4 | – | 0 | 1 | – | 4 | – | 1 |
| Howard (AL) | 0 | – | 2 | – | 1 | 3 | – | 3 | – | 1 |
| The Citadel | 0 | – | 2 | – | 0 | 3 | – | 3 | – | 0 |
| Mississippi College | 0 | – | 4 | – | 0 | 0 | – | 5 | – | 0 |
$ – Conference champion; There were several SIAA schools that did not field a team due to World War I.

The 1917 Auburn Tigers football team represented Auburn University in the 1917 Southern Intercollegiate Athletic Association football season. It was the Tigers' 26th season and they competed as a member of the Southern Intercollegiate Athletic Association (SIAA). The team was led by head coach Mike Donahue, in his 13th year, and played their home games at Drake Field in Auburn, Alabama. They finished with a record of six wins, two losses and one tie (6–2–1 overall, 5–1 in the SIAA).

Led by Walter Camp All-America Honorable Mention Moon Ducote, Auburn lost its two games to Davidson and Georgia Tech, widely regarded as the two best teams in the south. Georgia Tech was the south's first national champion. Auburn held undefeated Big Ten champion Ohio State to a scoreless tie.

== Schedule ==
| Date | Opponent | Site | Result | Attendance | Source |
|---|---|---|---|---|---|
| October 6 | 8th Ohio Infantry* | Soldiers Field; Montgomery, AL | W 13–0 | 2,500 | |
| October 13 | Howard (AL) | Drake Field; Auburn, AL | W 53–0 | | |
| October 19 | at Clemson | Riggs Field; Clemson, SC (rivalry) | W 7–0 | | |
| October 27 | Mississippi A&M | Rickwood Field; Birmingham, AL | W 13–6 | | |
| November 3 | Florida | Drake Field; Auburn, AL (rivalry) | W 68–0 | | |
| November 10 | vs. Davidson* | Grant Field; Atlanta, GA | L 7–21 | | |
| November 17 | at Vanderbilt | Dudley Field; Nashville, TN | W 31–7 | | |
| November 24 | Ohio State* | Soldiers Field; Montgomery, AL | T 0–0 | 10,000 | |
| November 29 | at Georgia Tech | Grant Field; Atlanta, GA (rivalry) | L 7–68 | | |
*Non-conference game

== Game summaries ==
=== 8th Ohio Infantry ===
The season opened with a 13–0 victory over the 8th Ohio Infantry at Montgomery.

=== Howard (AL) ===
In the second week of play, the Tigers defeated the Howard Baptists, 53–0.

=== Clemson ===
Auburn at Clemson

| Team | 1 | 2 | 3 | 4 | Total |
|---|---|---|---|---|---|
| • Auburn | 7 | 0 | 0 | 0 | 7 |
| Clemson | 0 | 0 | 0 | 0 | 0 |

- Date: October 19
- Location: Clemson, South Carolina
- Referee: John R. Bender

Auburn beat Clemson on Riggs Field 7–0, in a close game. Ducote starred for Auburn and Stumpy Banks starred for Clemson.

Auburn's starting lineup was Ducote (left end), Caton (left tackle), Samford (left guard), Rogers (center), Warren (right guard), Bonner (right tackle), Styles (right end), Robinson (quarterback), Donahue (left halfback), Creel (right halfback), Revington (fullback).

=== Mississippi A&M ===
Mississippi A&M at Auburn

| Team | 1 | 2 | 3 | 4 | Total |
|---|---|---|---|---|---|
| Miss. A&M | 6 | 0 | 0 | 0 | 6 |
| • Auburn | 0 | 7 | 6 | 0 | 13 |

- Date: October 27
- Location: Birmingham, Alabama
- Referee: Thomas (Purdue)

Auburn won a tough game with the Mississippi Aggies, winning 13–6. The Aggies score when their tackle, Horton, picked up a fumble and ran 95 yards for a touchdown.

Auburn's starting lineup was Styles (left end), Caton (left tackle), Sizemore (left guard), Rogers (center), Warren (right guard), Bonner (right tackle), Gibson (right end), Ducote (quarterback), Donahue (left halfback), Trapp (right halfback), Revington (fullback).

=== Florida ===
Florida at Auburn

| Team | 1 | 2 | 3 | 4 | Total |
|---|---|---|---|---|---|
| Florida | 0 | 0 | 0 | 0 | 0 |
| • Auburn | 14 | 19 | 21 | 14 | 68 |

- Date: November 6
- Location: Auburn, Alabama
- Referee: Tom Dutton

Auburn's biggest win was 68–0 over Florida.

Auburn's starting lineup was Creel (left end), Styles (left tackle), Sizemore (left guard), Caton (center), Warren (right guard), Bonner (right tackle), Gibson (right end), Ducote (quarterback), Donahue (left halfback), Trapp (right halfback), Revington (fullback).

=== Davidson ===
Davidson vs. Auburn

| Team | 1 | 2 | 3 | 4 | Total |
|---|---|---|---|---|---|
| • Davidson | 0 | 7 | 7 | 7 | 21 |
| Auburn | 0 | 0 | 7 | 0 | 7 |

- Date: November 10
- Location: Atlanta
- Game start: 2:30 p.m.
- Referee: Lewis (Virginia)

Davidson, led by Buck Flowers, beat the Tigers 21–7 in an upset, one of the greatest in Southern history. Flowers returned a punt 65 yards for a touchdown, caught a pass for a second touchdown, set up a third touchdown with an 85-yard return to Auburn's two-yard line, and kicked all three extra points for the Wildcats. He also prevented Auburn from scoring with a tackle at the goal line.

Auburn's starting lineup was Esslinger (left end), Styles (left tackle), Sizemore (left guard), Caton (center), Warren (right guard), Bonner (right tackle), Gibson (right end), Robinson (quarterback), Donahue (left halfback), Ducote (right halfback), Revington (fullback).

=== Vanderbilt ===
Auburn at Vanderbilt

| Team | 1 | 2 | 3 | 4 | Total |
|---|---|---|---|---|---|
| • Auburn | 6 | 6 | 13 | 6 | 31 |
| Vanderbilt | 0 | 0 | 0 | 7 | 7 |

- Date: November 17
- Location: Nashville, Tennessee
- Referee: Bradley Walker

The Tigers defeated Dan McGugin's Vanderbilt Commodores 31–7.

Auburn's starting lineup was Gibson (left end), Styles (left tackle), Sizemore (left guard), Caton (center), Warren (right guard), Bonner (right tackle), Creel (right end), Robinson (quarterback), Donahue (left halfback), Ducote (right halfback), Revington (fullback).

=== Ohio State ===
Ohio State at Auburn

| Team | 1 | 2 | 3 | 4 | Total |
|---|---|---|---|---|---|
| Ohio St. | 0 | 0 | 0 | 0 | 0 |
| Auburn | 0 | 0 | 0 | 0 | 0 |

- Date: November 24
- Location: Montgomery, Alabama
- Referee: Bradley Walker

Auburn held undefeated Big Ten champion Ohio State to a scoreless tie less than a week before the Tech game. Ohio State, led by Chic Harley, had been favored 4 or 5 to 1. Coach John Heisman (who previously coached at Auburn) and his players were at the game, rooting for the Tigers. Auburn stopped Ohio State inside its 10-yard line five times.

Auburn's starting lineup was Creel (left end), Styles (left tackle), Sizemore (left guard), Caton (center), Warren (right guard), Bonner (right tackle), Gibson (right end), Robinson (quarterback), Donahue (left halfback), Ducote (right halfback), Revington (fullback).

=== Georgia Tech ===
Auburn at Georgia Tech

| Team | 1 | 2 | 3 | 4 | Total |
|---|---|---|---|---|---|
| Auburn | 0 | 0 | 0 | 7 | 7 |
| • Ga. Tech | 20 | 13 | 21 | 14 | 68 |

- Date: November 29
- Location: Grant Field
  Atlanta
- Game attendance: 20,000
- Referee: Jogger Elcock

In the season's final game, Georgia Tech, for year's considered the South's greatest, Auburn 68–7. Tech piled up 472 yards on the ground in 84 rushes and 145 yards in the air. Joe Guyon scored four touchdowns, and Everett Strupper had a 65-yard touchdown run. According to the Atlanta Journal,

It was not the length of the run that featured it was the brilliance of it. After getting through the first line, Stroop was tackled squarely by two secondary men, and yet he squirmed and jerked loosed from them, only to face the safety man and another Tiger, coming at him from different angles. Without checking his speed Everett knifed the two men completely, running between them and dashing on to a touchdown.

In the second quarter, Moon Ducote broke through the line toward the goal with blocking by Pete Bonner and William Donahue. After Guyon dove at Ducote and missed, Guyon gave chase and tackled him at the 26-yard line. For Auburn's only score Ducote circled around end for 17 yards and lateraled to Donahue, who ran down the sideline for a six-yard touchdown. Guyon was the star of the game, accounting for four touchdowns and having his best day passing. Strupper had touchdown runs of 62 and 50 yards. Auburn's starting lineup was Gibson (left end), Martin (left tackle), Sizemore (left guard), Caton (center), Warren (right guard), Bonner (right tackle), Styles (right end), Robinson (quarterback), Donahue (left halfback), Ducote (right halfback), Revington (fullback)

== Postseason ==
Despite the lopsided loss to Tech, Auburn was considered a strong team. Ducote and Bonner were the only non-Tech, unanimous All-Southern selections. Coach Donahue later said that Ducote was "undoubtedly the best ever."
