= 1917 Centre football team =

American college football season

1917 Centre football
- Conference: Southern Intercollegiate Athletic Association
- Record: 7–1 (1–0 SIAA)
- Head coach: Robert L. Myers (1st season; first 2 games); Charley Moran (1st season, final 6 games)
- Offensive scheme: Single-wing
- Home stadium: Cheek Field

1917 Southern Intercollegiate Athletic Association football standings
	Conf.					Overall
Team	W		L		T	W		L		T
Georgia Tech $	4	–	0	–	0	9	–	0	–	0
Auburn	5	–	1	–	0	6	–	2	–	1
Clemson	5	–	1	–	0	6	–	2	–	0
Centre	1	–	0	–	0	7	–	1	–	0
Mississippi A&M	3	–	1	–	0	6	–	1	–	0
Alabama	3	–	1	–	1	5	–	2	–	1
Sewanee	4	–	2	–	1	5	–	2	–	1
Tulane	2	–	1	–	0	5	–	3	–	0
Vanderbilt	3	–	2	–	0	5	–	3	–	0
LSU	2	–	3	–	0	3	–	5	–	0
South Carolina	2	–	3	–	0	3	–	5	–	0
Wofford	1	–	2	–	0	5	–	4	–	0
Furman	1	–	3	–	0	3	–	5	–	0
Florida	1	–	3	–	0	2	–	4	–	0
Ole Miss	1	–	4	–	0	1	–	4	–	1
Howard (AL)	0	–	2	–	1	3	–	3	–	1
The Citadel	0	–	2	–	0	3	–	3	–	0
Mississippi College	0	–	4	–	0	0	–	5	–	0
$ – Conference champion; There were several SIAA schools that did not field a team due to World War I.

The 1917 Centre football team represented Centre College in the 1917 college football season and began a string of unparalleled success for the school. The first two games were coached by Robert L. Myers, and the rest by Charley Moran. According to Centre publications, "Myers realized he was dealing with a group of exceptional athletes, who were far beyond his ability to coach. He needed someone who could the team justice, and found that person in Charles Moran."

In 1916, Myers became coach at his alma mater Centre after coaching at North Side High School in Fort Worth, Texas. His team there included future Centre stars Bo McMillin and Red Weaver, who were recruited by boosters to Somerset High School in Kentucky where they joined up with Red Roberts. Also at North Side were Sully Montgomery, Matty Bell, Bill James, and Bob Mathias. McMillin kicked and made his only ever field goal attempt to defeat Kentucky 3 to 0.

Edgar Diddle was a halfback on the team.

== Schedule ==
Date	Time	Opponent	Site	Result	Source
October 6		Kentucky Military Institute*	Cheek Field; Danville, KY	W 104–0	
October 20		at DePauw*	Greencastle, IN	L 0–6	
October 27		at Maryville (TN)*	Maryville, TN	W 34–0	
November 3		Kentucky*	Cheek Field; Danville, KY (rivalry)	W 3–0	
November 9		at Kentucky Wesleyan*	Winchester, KY	W 37–0	
November 17	2:30 p.m.	vs. Sewanee	Chamberlain Field; Chattanooga, TN	W 28–0	
November 24		at Transylvania*	Thomas Field; Lexington, KY	W 28–0	
November 29		Georgetown (KY)*	Cheek Field; Danville, KY	W 13–0	
*Non-conference game
