= 1917 Mississippi College Collegians football team =

American college football season

1917 Mississippi College Collegians football
- Conference: Southern Intercollegiate Athletic Association
- Record: 0–5 (0–4 SIAA)
- Head coach: W. A. Robinson (1st season)
- Home stadium: Provine Field

1917 Southern Intercollegiate Athletic Association football standings
	Conf.					Overall
Team	W		L		T	W		L		T
Georgia Tech $	4	–	0	–	0	9	–	0	–	0
Auburn	5	–	1	–	0	6	–	2	–	1
Clemson	5	–	1	–	0	6	–	2	–	0
Centre	1	–	0	–	0	7	–	1	–	0
Mississippi A&M	3	–	1	–	0	6	–	1	–	0
Alabama	3	–	1	–	1	5	–	2	–	1
Sewanee	4	–	2	–	1	5	–	2	–	1
Tulane	2	–	1	–	0	5	–	3	–	0
Vanderbilt	3	–	2	–	0	5	–	3	–	0
LSU	2	–	3	–	0	3	–	5	–	0
South Carolina	2	–	3	–	0	3	–	5	–	0
Wofford	1	–	2	–	0	5	–	4	–	0
Furman	1	–	3	–	0	3	–	5	–	0
Florida	1	–	3	–	0	2	–	4	–	0
Ole Miss	1	–	4	–	0	1	–	4	–	1
Howard (AL)	0	–	2	–	1	3	–	3	–	1
The Citadel	0	–	2	–	0	3	–	3	–	0
Mississippi College	0	–	4	–	0	0	–	5	–	0
$ – Conference champion; There were several SIAA schools that did not field a team due to World War I.

The 1917 Mississippi College Collegians football team was an American football team that represented Mississippi College as a member of the Southern Intercollegiate Athletic Association (SIAA) during the 1917 college football season. In their first year under head coach W. A. Robinson, the team compiled a 0–5 record.

== Schedule ==
Date	Opponent	Site	Result	Source
October 13	at Mississippi A&M	New Athletic Field; Starkville, MS	L 0–68	
October 20	at Alabama	University Field; Tuscaloosa, AL	L 0–46	
October 26	Ouachita*	Jackson, MS	L 0–7	
November 10	at LSU	State Field; Baton Rouge, LA	L 0–34	
November 29	Ole Miss	State Fairgrounds; Jackson, MS	L 0–21	
*Non-conference game
