= 1917 LSU Tigers football team =

American college football season

1917 LSU Tigers football
- Conference: Southern Intercollegiate Athletic Association
- Record: 3–5 (2–3 SIAA)
- Head coach: Wayne Sutton (1st season)
- Captain: Arthur "Mickey" O'Quinn
- Home stadium: State Field

1917 Southern Intercollegiate Athletic Association football standings
	Conf.					Overall
Team	W		L		T	W		L		T
Georgia Tech $	4	–	0	–	0	9	–	0	–	0
Auburn	5	–	1	–	0	6	–	2	–	1
Clemson	5	–	1	–	0	6	–	2	–	0
Centre	1	–	0	–	0	7	–	1	–	0
Mississippi A&M	3	–	1	–	0	6	–	1	–	0
Alabama	3	–	1	–	1	5	–	2	–	1
Sewanee	4	–	2	–	1	5	–	2	–	1
Tulane	2	–	1	–	0	5	–	3	–	0
Vanderbilt	3	–	2	–	0	5	–	3	–	0
LSU	2	–	3	–	0	3	–	5	–	0
South Carolina	2	–	3	–	0	3	–	5	–	0
Wofford	1	–	2	–	0	5	–	4	–	0
Furman	1	–	3	–	0	3	–	5	–	0
Florida	1	–	3	–	0	2	–	4	–	0
Ole Miss	1	–	4	–	0	1	–	4	–	1
Howard (AL)	0	–	2	–	1	3	–	3	–	1
The Citadel	0	–	2	–	0	3	–	3	–	0
Mississippi College	0	–	4	–	0	0	–	5	–	0
$ – Conference champion; There were several SIAA schools that did not field a team due to World War I.

The 1917 LSU Tigers football team represented the University of Louisiana (now known as Louisiana State University or LSU) as a member of the Southern Intercollegiate Athletic Association (SIAA) during the 1917 college football season. Led by first-year head coach Wayne Sutton, the Tigers compiled an overall record of 3–5, with a mark of 2–3 in conference play, and finished tied for 10th in the SIAA. LSU played home games at State Field in Baton Rouge, Louisiana.

== Schedule ==
Date	Opponent	Site	Result	Source
October 6	Southwestern Louisiana Industrial*	State Field; Baton Rouge, LA	W 20–6	
October 13	at Ole Miss	Hemingway Stadium; Oxford, MS (rivalry)	W 52–7	
October 20	Sewanee	Heinemann Park; New Orleans, LA	L 0–3	
October 27	vs. Texas A&M*	League Park; San Antonio, TX (rivalry)	L 0–27	
November 3	vs. Arkansas*	Fair Grounds; Shreveport, LA (rivalry)	L 0–14	
November 10	Mississippi College	State Field; Baton Rouge, LA	W 34–0	
November 17	Mississippi A&M	State Field; Baton Rouge, LA (rivalry)	L 0–9	
November 29	Tulane	State Field; Baton Rouge, LA (Battle for the Rag)	L 6–28	
*Non-conference game
