= 1917 South Carolina Gamecocks football team =

American college football season

1917 South Carolina Gamecocks football
- Conference: Southern Intercollegiate Athletic Association
- Record: 3–5 (2–3 SIAA)
- Head coach: Dixon Foster (1st season)
- Captain: Sumpter Clark
- Home stadium: Davis Field

1917 Southern Intercollegiate Athletic Association football standings
| | Conf. | | | | | Overall |
| Team | W | | L | | T | W | | L | | T |
|---|---|---|---|---|---|---|---|---|---|---|
| Georgia Tech $ | 4 | – | 0 | – | 0 | 9 | – | 0 | – | 0 |
| Auburn | 5 | – | 1 | – | 0 | 6 | – | 2 | – | 1 |
| Clemson | 5 | – | 1 | – | 0 | 6 | – | 2 | – | 0 |
| Centre | 1 | – | 0 | – | 0 | 7 | – | 1 | – | 0 |
| Mississippi A&M | 3 | – | 1 | – | 0 | 6 | – | 1 | – | 0 |
| Alabama | 3 | – | 1 | – | 1 | 5 | – | 2 | – | 1 |
| Sewanee | 4 | – | 2 | – | 1 | 5 | – | 2 | – | 1 |
| Tulane | 2 | – | 1 | – | 0 | 5 | – | 3 | – | 0 |
| Vanderbilt | 3 | – | 2 | – | 0 | 5 | – | 3 | – | 0 |
| LSU | 2 | – | 3 | – | 0 | 3 | – | 5 | – | 0 |
| South Carolina | 2 | – | 3 | – | 0 | 3 | – | 5 | – | 0 |
| Wofford | 1 | – | 2 | – | 0 | 5 | – | 4 | – | 0 |
| Furman | 1 | – | 3 | – | 0 | 3 | – | 5 | – | 0 |
| Florida | 1 | – | 3 | – | 0 | 2 | – | 4 | – | 0 |
| Ole Miss | 1 | – | 4 | – | 0 | 1 | – | 4 | – | 1 |
| Howard (AL) | 0 | – | 2 | – | 1 | 3 | – | 3 | – | 1 |
| The Citadel | 0 | – | 2 | – | 0 | 3 | – | 3 | – | 0 |
| Mississippi College | 0 | – | 4 | – | 0 | 0 | – | 5 | – | 0 |
$ – Conference champion; There were several SIAA schools that did not field a team due to World War I.

The 1917 South Carolina Gamecocks football team represented the University of South Carolina during the 1917 Southern Intercollegiate Athletic Association football season. Led by first-year head coach Dixon Foster, the Gamecocks compiled an overall record of 3–5 with a mark of 2–3 in SIAA play.

== Schedule ==
| Date | Opponent | Site | Result | Source |
|---|---|---|---|---|
| October 6 | Newberry* | Davis Field; Columbia, SC | W 38–0 | |
| October 13 | at Florida | Fleming Field; Gainesville, FL | L 13–21 | |
| October 25 | Clemson | State Fairgrounds; Columbia, SC | L 13–21 | |
| November 3 | Erskine* | Davis Field; Columbia, SC | L 13–14 | |
| November 8 | vs. Furman | Pee Dee Fair; Florence, SC | W 26–0 | |
| November 17 | at Wofford | Spartanburg Fairgrounds; Spartanburg, SC | L 0–20 | |
| November 24 | Presbyterian* | Davis Field; Columbia, SC | L 14–20 | |
| November 29 | The Citadel | Davis Field; Columbia, SC | W 20–0 | |
*Non-conference game
