= 1917 Tulane Olive and Blue football team =

American college football season

1917 Tulane Olive and Blue football
- Conference: Southern Intercollegiate Athletic Association
- Record: 5–3 (2–1 SIAA)
- Head coach: Clark Shaughnessy (3rd season)
- Offensive scheme: Single-wing
- Captain: Game captains
- Home stadium: Second Tulane Stadium

1917 Southern Intercollegiate Athletic Association football standings
	Conf.					Overall
Team	W		L		T	W		L		T
Georgia Tech $	4	–	0	–	0	9	–	0	–	0
Auburn	5	–	1	–	0	6	–	2	–	1
Clemson	5	–	1	–	0	6	–	2	–	0
Centre	1	–	0	–	0	7	–	1	–	0
Mississippi A&M	3	–	1	–	0	6	–	1	–	0
Alabama	3	–	1	–	1	5	–	2	–	1
Sewanee	4	–	2	–	1	5	–	2	–	1
Tulane	2	–	1	–	0	5	–	3	–	0
Vanderbilt	3	–	2	–	0	5	–	3	–	0
LSU	2	–	3	–	0	3	–	5	–	0
South Carolina	2	–	3	–	0	3	–	5	–	0
Wofford	1	–	2	–	0	5	–	4	–	0
Furman	1	–	3	–	0	3	–	5	–	0
Florida	1	–	3	–	0	2	–	4	–	0
Ole Miss	1	–	4	–	0	1	–	4	–	1
Howard (AL)	0	–	2	–	1	3	–	3	–	1
The Citadel	0	–	2	–	0	3	–	3	–	0
Mississippi College	0	–	4	–	0	0	–	5	–	0
$ – Conference champion; There were several SIAA schools that did not field a team due to World War I.

The 1917 Tulane Olive and Blue football team was an American football team that represented Tulane University as a member of the Southern Intercollegiate Athletic Association (SIAA) during the 1917 college football season. In its third year under head coach Clark Shaughnessy, Tulane compiled a 5–3 record (2–1 in conference games), finished eighth in the SIAA, and outscored opponents by a total of 159 to 105.

== Schedule ==
Date	Opponent	Site	Result	Source
October 6	Jefferson College (LA)*	Tulane Stadium; New Orleans, LA	W 32–0	
October 13	Spring Hill*	Tulane Stadium; New Orleans, LA	W 28–0	
October 20	at Florida	Fleming Field; Gainesville, FL	W 52–0	
October 27	141st Field Artillery*	Tulane Stadium; New Orleans, LA	W 19–0	
November 2	at Texas A&M*	Kyle Field; College Station, TX	L 0–35	
November 10	Georgia Tech	Tulane Stadium; New Orleans, LA	L 0–48	
November 17	Rice*	Tulane Stadium; New Orleans, LA	L 0–16	
November 29	at LSU	State Field; Baton Rouge, LA (Battle for the Rag)	W 28–6	
*Non-conference game
