= C. W. Streit =

American football player, coach, and official (1884–1971)

Biographical details
- Born: June 1, 1884; Birmingham, Alabama, U.S.
- Died: April 4, 1971 (aged 86); Birmingham, Alabama, U.S.

Playing career

Football
- 1904–1905: Auburn
- 1907–1908: Washington and Lee
- Position: Tackle

Coaching career (HC unless noted)

Football
- 1917: Howard (AL)

Head coaching record
- Overall: 1–1

Charles William Streit Jr. (June 1, 1884 – April 4, 1971) was an American football player, coach, and official. He played college football at Auburn University and Washington and Lee University. Streit served as the head football coach at Howard College—now known as Samford University—for the final two games of the 1917 season.

== College ==
Streit was a three-sport (football, track, and basketball) letterman at Auburn University, as well as at Washington and Lee University. At Auburn, he and Frank Jones stood out for Auburn at tackle.

== Official ==
Streit's first appearance officiating was in a Georgia–Georgia Tech game in which Streit claimed he may have seen the "first fake pass in the history of football in that game. The Georgia quarterback drifted back with something that looked like a football and gave it a long heave. It turned out to be his head guard. That, of course, would be illegal today, but it would still be just as funny."

Streit was the referee for the 1929 Rose Bowl in which Roy Riegels scooped up a Georgia Tech fumble and ran toward his own goal line. The two-point safety on the ensuing punt proved to be the margin of victory.

Streit also officiated Southeastern Conference track and field meets.

=== Olympics ===
Streit was one of six track managers on the U.S. Olympic teams that went to Paris (1924), Amsterdam (1928), Los Angeles (1932) and Berlin (1936). Bill was a member of the Executive Committee of the U.S. Olympics from 1948 to 1952.

In 1924, Streit was appointed chairman of the U.S: Olympic wrestling committee and that ' team became the first from the United States to win the Olympic wrestling title. That same year he also was named vice president of the- International Wrestling Association, the first American to hold the post. He was U.S. Olympic wrestling chairman in 1929, 1932 and 1936.

== Honors and death ==
Streit was inducted into the Alabama Sports Hall of Fame in 1951. He died on April 4, 1971, in Birmingham, Alabama.

== Head coaching record ==
Year	Team	Overall	Conference	Standing	Bowl/playoffs
Howard Baptists (Southern Intercollegiate Athletic Association) (1917)
1917	Howard	1–1 (Note: John B. Longwell coached only the first five games of the season. Streit coached the final two games of the season. Howard finished the with an overall record of 3–3–1 and a mark of 0–2–1 in conference play.)	0–0		
Howard:		1–1	0–0		
Total:		1–1			
