= Alfred M. Boone =

American football player, baseball player, athletics administrator, insurance executive

Biographical details
- Born: July 23, 1893
- Died: March 1, 1961 (aged 67); New York City, U.S.

Playing career

Football
- 1917–1918: Alabama

Baseball
- 1918–1919: Alabama
- Positions: End (football); Pitcher (baseball)

Coaching career (HC unless noted)

Football
- 1919: Alabama (assistant)

Administrative career (AD unless noted)
- 1919–1920: Alabama (acting AD)

Accomplishments and honors

Awards
- Football; All-Southern (1917) Baseball; All-Southern (1919)

Alfred Morgan "Dan" Boone (July 23, 1893 – March 1, 1961) was an American college football and college baseball player, athletics administrator, and insurance executive. Boone played football and baseball at the University of Alabama. He served as the acting athletic director for the university during the 1919–20 academic year, following the resignation of B. L. Noojin.

Boone was selected to the 1917 College Football All-Southern Team as an end and the 1919 College Baseball All-Southern Team as a pitcher. A native of Berry, Alabama, he graduated from the University of Alabama in 1919 with a Doctor of Law degree. Boone assisted Xen C. Scott in coaching the 1919 Alabama Crimson Tide football team.

Boone later managed Birmingham, Alabama office of USF&G. He died on March 1, 1961, in New York City.
