= Stumpy Banks =

American football player and athletic director (1898–1960)

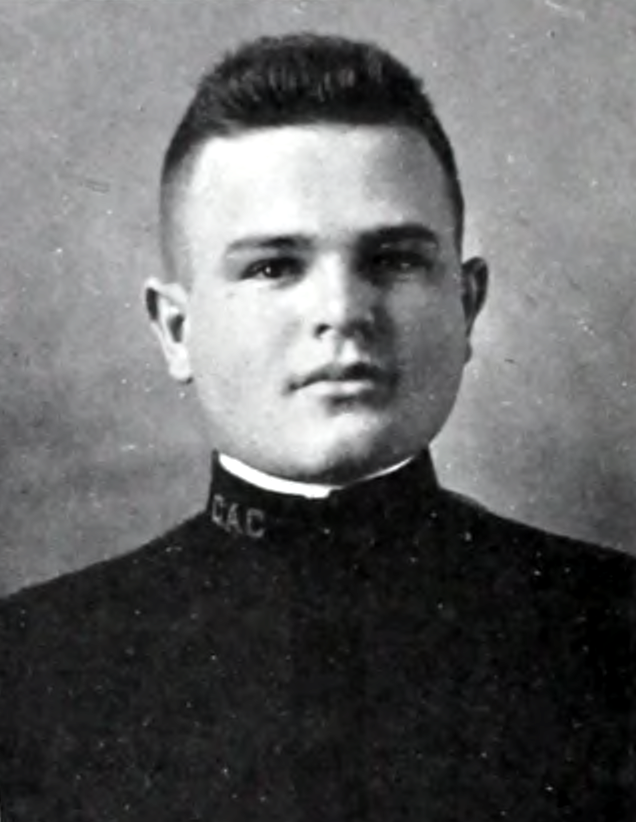
- Banks at Clemson in 1918

Profile
- Positions: Quarterback, halfback

Personal information
- Born: July 12, 1898; St. Matthews, South Carolina, U.S.
- Died: November 15, 1960 (aged 62); St. Matthews, South Carolina, U.S.

Career information
- College: Clemson (1915–1919)

Awards and highlights
- All-Southern (1919); School record, touchdowns in a game (5)

Bertram Cecil "Stumpy" Banks (July 12, 1898 – November 15, 1960) was an American college football player and athletic director. He was a prominent running back, receiving five varsity letters for the Clemson Tigers. He scored five touchdowns against Furman in 1917 for a school record. He caught two touchdowns against rival South Carolina in 1916. Banks was captain of both the 1918 and 1919 teams. He was selected All-Southern by John Heisman. After college, he was the athletic director at Claflin University.

Banks was born on July 12, 1898, in St. Matthews, South Carolina, to James Arthur Banks and Margaret Houser Banks. His father served in the South Carolina House of Representatives and the South Carolina Senate. The younger Banks attended the local public schools in St. Matthews before entering Clemson in 1914. Banks coached high school football in Tallulah, Louisiana from 1923 to 1924 and at Carlisle Military School in Bamberg, South Carolina from 1928 to 1929. He later operated a dairy near his hometown. Banks died on November 15, 1960, at his home in St. Matthews.
