= 1917 Southwestern Louisiana Industrial football team =

American college football season

1917 Southwestern Louisiana Industrial football

LIAA champion
- Conference: Louisiana Intercollegiate Athletic Association
- Record: 8–2 ( LIAA)
- Head coach: Clement J. McNaspy (6th season)
- Home stadium: Campus Athletic Field

The 1917 Southwestern Louisiana Industrial football team was an American football team that represented the Southwestern Louisiana Industrial Institute (now known as the University of Louisiana at Lafayette) as a member of the Louisiana Intercollegiate Athletic Association (LIAA) during the 1917 college football season. In their sixth year under head coach Clement J. McNaspy, the team compiled an overall record of 8–2.

== Schedule ==
Date	Opponent	Site	Result	Source
September 29	at St. Charles College (LA)	Grand Coteau, LA	W 26–0	
October 6	at LSU*	State Field; Baton Rouge, LA	L 6–20	
October 13	LSU JV*	Fairgrounds; Lafayette, LA	W 22–0	
	Louisiana College		W 36–0	
	Crowley*		W 54–0	
October 27	at Spring Hill*	Monroe Field; Mobile, AL	W 0–6	
November 3	Jefferson (LA)*	Campus Athletic Field; Lafayette, LA	W 32–0	
November 10	St. Martinville*	Campus Athletic Field; Lafayette, LA	W 69–0	
November 17	at Louisiana Industrial	Ruston, LA	W 57–0	
November 29	at Louisiana Normal	Normal Athletic Park; Natchitoches, LA	W 34–0	
*Non-conference game
