= Alfred T. Adams =

American athlete and lawyer (1898–1982)

Alf Adams
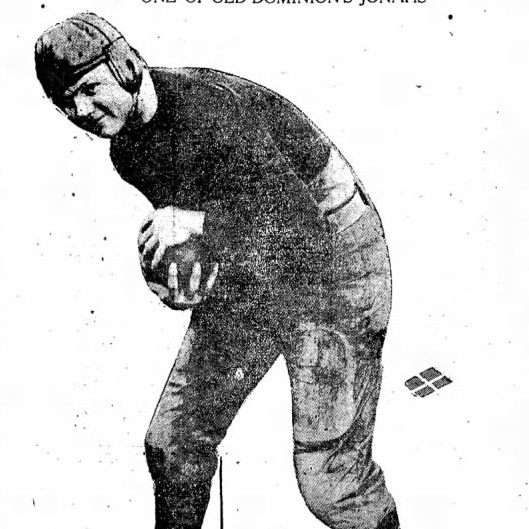

Profile
- Positions: End; Guard/center (basketball)

Personal information
- Born: January 8, 1898; Nashville, Tennessee
- Died: December 4, 1982 (aged 84); Nashville, Tennessee
- Listed weight: 175 lb (79 kg)

Career information
- College: Vanderbilt (1915–1920)

Awards and highlights
- All-Southern (1917, 1919); SIAA championship (football) (1915); SIAA championship (basketball) (1920)

Alfred Thompson Adams (January 8, 1898 – December 4, 1982) was an attorney and an American football and basketball player and coach. He played for the Vanderbilt Commodores of Vanderbilt University.

== Early life ==
Alfred Thompson Adams was born on January 8, 1898, in Nashville, Tennessee, to Adams Gillespie Adams, II and Sue Howell. He was the sixth son, and his father died early in Adams' life.

== Vanderbilt University ==
At Vanderbilt he was a member of the Phi Delta Theta fraternity. He graduated with a B. S in 1918 and an LL.B from Vanderbilt Law School in 1921.

=== Football ===
Adams was a prominent member of Dan McGugin's Vanderbilt Commodores football teams. Adams was selected as an All-Southern end in 1917 and 1919.

==== 1917 ====
He was captain of the 1917 football team, the last non-senior to be such until 2003. Adams was selected All-Southern in 1917, a season which featured the south's first national champion in Georgia Tech. Tech gave Vandy its worst ever loss, 83 to 0. Adams praised Tech: "Tech's magnificent machine won easily over Vanderbilt. It was simply the matter of a splendid eleven winning over an unseasoned, inexperienced team. "Tech played hard, clean football, and we were somewhat surprised to meet such a fair, aggressive team, after the reports we had heard. I think that Vanderbilt could have broken that Tech shift if we had had last year's eleven. Being outweighed, Vanderbilt could not check the heavy forwards, or open up the line. Thereby hangs the tale."

=== Basketball ===
==== 1919–1920 ====
Adams played on the 1920 SIAA championship team with the likes of Josh Cody and Tom Zerfoss.

== High school football ==
In 1920 he coached the Hume-Fogg High School football team.

== Legal career ==
Following his passing the bar, Adams entered practice with his uncle R. B. C. Howell and former Vandy quarterback Myles P. O'Connor.
