= 1917 Clemson Tigers football team =

American college football season

1917 Clemson Tigers football
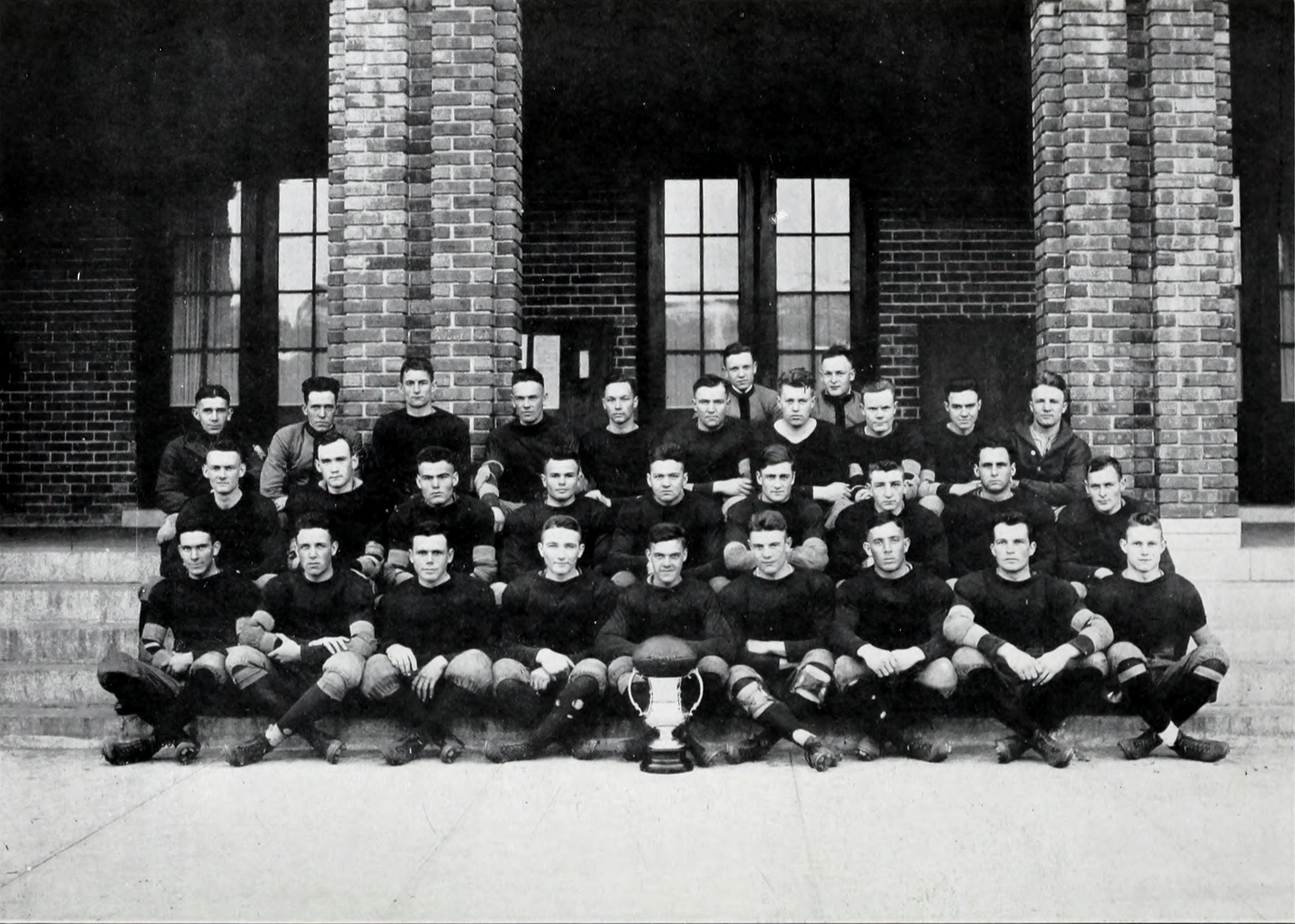
- Conference: Southern Intercollegiate Athletic Association
- Record: 6–2 (5–1 SIAA)
- Head coach: Edward Donahue (1st season)
- Captain: F. L. Witsel
- Home stadium: Riggs Field

1917 Southern Intercollegiate Athletic Association football standings
	Conf.					Overall
Team	W		L		T	W		L		T
Georgia Tech $	4	–	0	–	0	9	–	0	–	0
Auburn	5	–	1	–	0	6	–	2	–	1
Clemson	5	–	1	–	0	6	–	2	–	0
Centre	1	–	0	–	0	7	–	1	–	0
Mississippi A&M	3	–	1	–	0	6	–	1	–	0
Alabama	3	–	1	–	1	5	–	2	–	1
Sewanee	4	–	2	–	1	5	–	2	–	1
Tulane	2	–	1	–	0	5	–	3	–	0
Vanderbilt	3	–	2	–	0	5	–	3	–	0
LSU	2	–	3	–	0	3	–	5	–	0
South Carolina	2	–	3	–	0	3	–	5	–	0
Wofford	1	–	2	–	0	5	–	4	–	0
Furman	1	–	3	–	0	3	–	5	–	0
Florida	1	–	3	–	0	2	–	4	–	0
Ole Miss	1	–	4	–	0	1	–	4	–	1
Howard (AL)	0	–	2	–	1	3	–	3	–	1
The Citadel	0	–	2	–	0	3	–	3	–	0
Mississippi College	0	–	4	–	0	0	–	5	–	0
$ – Conference champion; There were several SIAA schools that did not field a team due to World War I.

The 1917 Clemson Tigers football team represented Clemson Agricultural College—now known as Clemson University—during the 1917 Southern Intercollegiate Athletic Association football season. Under first-year head coach Edward Donahue, the team posted an overall record of 6–2 with a mark of 5–1 in SIAA play. F. L. Witsel was the team captain.

Stumpy Banks scored five touchdowns against Furman, setting a school record. John Heisman ranked Clemson fourth in the south, or third in the Southern Intercollegiate Athletic Association.

== Schedule ==
Date	Time	Opponent	Site	Result	Source
September 28		Presbyterian*	Riggs Field; Calhoun, SC	W 13–0	
October 13	3:30 p.m.	at Furman	Riverside Park; Greenville, SC	W 38–0	
October 19		Auburn	Riggs Field; Calhoun, SC (rivalry)	L 0–7	
October 25		at South Carolina	State Fairgrounds; Columbia, SC (rivalry)	W 21–13	
November 1		at Wofford	Spartanburg, SC	W 27–16	
November 8		vs. The Citadel	County Fairgrounds; Orangeburg, SC	W 20–0	
November 17		vs. Florida	Barrs Field; Jacksonville, FL	W 55–7	
November 29		vs. Davidson*	Wearn Field; Charlotte, NC	L 9–21	
*Non-conference game

== Bibliography ==
- Bourret, Tim. "2010 Clemson Football Media Guide" (PDF). Clemson University. p. 202. Archived from the original (PDF) on November 12, 2012.
