= 1917 VPI Gobblers football team =

American college football season

1917 VPI Gobblers football
- Conference: South Atlantic Intercollegiate Athletic Association
- Record: 6–2–1 (2–1–1 SAIAA)
- Head coach: Charles Bernier (1st season)
- Captain: Harry Temple Parrish
- Home stadium: Miles Field

1917 South Atlantic Intercollegiate Athletic Association football standings
	Conf.					Overall
Team	W		L		T	W		L		T
Georgetown $	2	–	0	–	0	8	–	1	–	0
Richmond	2	–	1	–	0	4	–	2	–	1
Washington and Lee	2	–	1	–	0	4	–	3	–	0
North Carolina A&M	2	–	1	–	1	6	–	2	–	1
VPI	2	–	1	–	1	6	–	2	–	1
Maryland State	2	–	1	–	1	4	–	3	–	1
Davidson	1	–	2	–	0	6	–	4	–	0
VMI	1	–	3	–	1	4	–	4	–	1
St. John's (MD)	0	–	1	–	0	0	–	1	–	0
Johns Hopkins	0	–	1	–	0	0	–	3	–	0
William & Mary	0	–	3	–	0	3	–	5	–	0
$ – Conference champion

The 1917 VPI Gobblers football team represented the Virginia Polytechnic Institute in the 1917 college football season. The team was led by their head coach Charles Bernier and finished with a record of six wins, two losses and one tie (6–2–1).

== Schedule ==
Date	Time	Opponent	Site	Result	Attendance	Source
October 6		Hampden–Sydney*	Miles Field; Blacksburg, VA	W 12–0		
October 13		Emory and Henry*	Miles Field; Blacksburg, VA	W 59–6		
October 20		Davidson	Miles Field; Blacksburg, VA	W 13–7		
October 27	3:00 p.m.	at Georgetown	Georgetown Field; Washington, DC	L 0–28		
November 3		Wake Forest*	Miles Field; Blacksburg, VA	W 50–0		
November 10		vs. West Virginia*	League Park; Huntington, WV (rivalry)	L 3–27	4,000	
November 17	2:30 p.m.	vs. North Carolina A&M	League Park; Norfolk, VA	T 7–7	3,500	
November 24		Roanoke*	Miles Field; Blacksburg, VA	W 70–0		
November 29	2:45 p.m.	vs. VMI	Fair Grounds; Roanoke, VA (rivalry)	W 6–0		
*Non-conference game

== Before the season ==
The 1916 VPI Gobblers football team compiled a 7–2 record and were led by Jack E. Ingersoll in his only season as head coach.

== Game summaries ==
=== Hampden–Sydney ===
Hampden–Sydney vs. VPI

Team	1	2	3	4	Total
HS	0	0	0	0	0
• VPI	6	0	0	6	12

- Date: October 6, 1917
- Location: Miles Field
  Blacksburg, VA
- Referee: Denny (Davidson)

VPI's first game of the season was a victory over Hampden–Sydney at Miles Field.

The starting lineup for VPI was: Hardwick (left end), H. Parrish (left tackle), McNeil (left guard), Currie (center), Young (right guard), Crisp (right tackle), Younger (right end), E. Roden (quarterback), Peyton (left halfback), Benner (right halfback), Godsey (fullback). The substitutes were: Lester, B. Parrish, D. Roden, Wiegel and Willis.

The starting lineup for Hampden–Sydney was: Walter Aylor (left end), T. Scott (left tackle), J. W. Hogshead (left guard), R. G. Fergusson (center), Henry Allen (right guard), Ernest Herzig (right tackle), R. D. Warren (right end), Johns (quarterback), James Graham (left halfback), Thomas Parrish (right halfback), James Warren (fullback). The substitutes were: Henry Rolston.

=== Emory and Henry ===
After their victory over Hampden–Sydney, VPI played Emory and Henry University at Miles Field.

The starting lineup for VPI was: Powers (left end), H. Parrish (left tackle), McNeil (left guard), Currie (center), Lester (right guard), Rangely (right tackle), D. Roden (right end), Bock (quarterback), Wiegel (left halfback), Benner (right halfback), Crisp (fullback). The substitutes were: Charles, Godsey, Hardwick, Lybrook, Matthews, Mckann, Miller, Robinson, Thornton, Ward, Wills, Yates and Young.

The starting lineup for Emory and Henry was: E. H. Rowe (left end), Enright (left tackle), D. D. Morris (left guard), R. C. Lotspeich (center), J. E. Anderson (right guard), S. D. Tilson (right tackle), R. B. Terry (right end), Pedie Jackson (quarterback), A. C. French (left halfback), H. M. Hayter (right halfback), W. R. Tilson (fullback). The substitutes were: W. L. Hughes and Long.

=== Davidson ===
Davidson vs. VPI

Team	1	2	3	4	Total
Davidson	0	0	0	7	7
• VPI	0	0	6	7	13

- Date: October 20, 1917
- Location: Miles Field
  Blacksburg, VA
- Referee: Marshall (Maine)

The starting lineup for VPI was: Hardwick (left end), H. Parrish (left tackle), McNeil (left guard), Currie (center), Younger (right guard), Crisp (right tackle), Lester (right end), Lybrook (quarterback), Wiegel (left halfback), Benner (right halfback), Godsey (fullback). The substitutes were: Miller, Peyton, D. Roden and E. Roden.

The starting lineup for Davidson was: George M. King (left end), John Shaw (left tackle), John McMaster (left guard), William Crouch (center), J. D. Elliott (right guard), H. M. Grey (right tackle), Robert Richardson (right end), John McAlister (quarterback), George Crouch (left halfback), Buck Flowers (right halfback), Alvin Burns (fullback). The substitutes were: Clark, Harris, Lacy McAlister, George Miley, Birchie Romefelt and Henry Spann.

=== Georgetown ===
VPI at Georgetown

Team	1	2	3	4	Total
VPI	0	0	0	0	0
• Georgetown	14	0	0	14	28

- Date: October 27, 1917
- Location: Georgetown Field
  Washington, DC
- Game start: 3:00 p.m.
- Referee: Lieut. Dubois (Ottawa)

The starting lineup for VPI was: Hardwick (left end), H. Parrish (left tackle), McNeil (left guard), Currie (center), Lester (right guard), Crisp (right tackle), Younger (right end), E. Roden (quarterback), Peyton (left halfback), Benner (right halfback), Godsey (fullback). The substitutes were: Rangely, D. Roden and Yates.

The starting lineup for Georgetown was: Eddie Connell (left end), Dan Ahern (left tackle), William Dudack (left guard), Jack Heaply (center), Bob Zuger (right guard), Metzger Smeach (right tackle), Thomas Whelan (right end), Jackie Maloney (quarterback), Johnny Gilroy (left halfback), Johnny McQuade (right halfback), Pat Dugan (fullback).

=== Wake Forest ===
The starting lineup for VPI was: D. Roden (left end), H. Parrish (left tackle), Yates (left guard), Currie (center), Rangely (right guard), McNeil (right tackle), Younger (right end), E. Roden (quarterback), Peyton (left halfback), Benner (right halfback), Crisp (fullback). The substitutes were: Bock, Eldridge, Godsey, Hitchens, Lybrook, Miller, Thornton and Will.

The starting lineup for Wake Forest was: Henry Bowers (left end), Gay (left tackle), Jabez Williams (left guard), Blankenship (center), Will Tatum (right guard), Felix Blanchard (right tackle), William Savage (right end), Ashley Pace (quarterback), Harry Rabenhorst (left halfback), John Pace (right halfback), Phinehas Croom (fullback). The substitutes were: C. F. Gooch and J. A. McKaughan.

=== West Virginia ===
The starting lineup for VPI was: D. Roden (left end), McNeil (left tackle), Lester (left guard), Currie (center), Rangely (right guard), Crisp (right tackle), Younger (right end), E. Roden (quarterback), Bock (left halfback), Benner (right halfback), Godsey (fullback). The substitutes were: Miller, Peyton and Will.

The starting lineup for West Virginia was: Paul Hager (left end), Harry Curry (left tackle), McCue (left guard), Russ Bailey (center), Russ Meredith (right guard), Frank Ice (right tackle), Mills (right end), Harris (quarterback), Rip King (left halfback), Howard Lentz (right halfback), Ira Rodgers (fullback). The substitutes were: Calvert, Dorsey and Lewis.

=== North Carolina A&M ===
North Carolina A&M vs. VPI

Team	1	2	3	4	Total
NC A&M	0	0	0	7	7
VPI	7	0	0	0	7

- Date: November 17, 1917
- Location: League Park
  Norfolk, VA
- Game start: 2:30 p.m.
- Game attendance: 3,500
- Referee: Pat Barry (Georgetown)

The starting lineup for VPI was: D. Roden (left end), McNeil (left tackle), Lester (left guard), Currie (center), Rangely (right guard), Crisp (right tackle), Younger (right end), E. Roden (quarterback), Bock (left halfback), Benner (right halfback), Godsey (fullback). The substitutes were: Peyton.

The starting lineup for North Carolina A&M was: James Black (left end), Solomon Homewood (left tackle), John Ripple (left guard), William Whitaker (center), William Wagner (right guard), Jew Wagoner (right tackle), Andrew McMurray (right end), Dick Gurley (quarterback), John Faucette (left halfback), John Hudson (right halfback), George Murray (fullback).

=== Roanoke ===
The starting lineup for VPI was: D. Roden (left end), McNeil (left tackle), Yates (left guard), Miller (center), Hitchens (right guard), Rangely (right tackle), Thornton (right end), Lybrook (quarterback), Bock (left halfback), Godsey (right halfback), Crisp (fullback).

The starting lineup for Roanoke was: W. Atkinson (left end), B. D. Painter (left tackle), B. A. Barringer (left guard), W. D. Hull (center), Frank Cadwallader (right guard), Andrew Groseclose (right tackle), C. E. Beach (right end), S. White Rhyne (quarterback), Douglas Chapman (left halfback), P. B. Smith (right halfback), C. M. Moyer (fullback).

=== VMI ===
VMI vs. VPI

Team	1	2	3	4	Total
VMI	0	0	0	0	0
• VPI	0	0	0	6	6

- Date: November 29, 1917
- Location: Fair Grounds
  Roanoke, VA
- Game start: 2:45 p.m.
- Referee: A. G. Lankford (Trinity)

The starting lineup for VPI was: D. Roden (left end), H. Parrish (left tackle), McNeil (left guard), Currie (center), Lester (right guard), Crisp (right tackle), Younger (right end), E. Roden (quarterback), Bock (left halfback), Benner (right halfback), Godsey (fullback). The substitutes were: Peyton.

The starting lineup for VMI was: Peyton Marshall (left end), W. Goodman (left tackle), Lawrence Mantor (left guard), Frederick Knapp (center), William Addison (right guard), R. Thomas (right tackle), Crusselle Woodward (right end), Samuel Witt (quarterback), T. Smith (left halfback), Jimmy Leech (right halfback), Richard Dickson (fullback). The substitutes were: Anderson and Horace Roberdeau.

== After the season ==
In December 1917, the VPI players elected William L. Younger as captain of the 1918 VPI Gobblers football team.

== Players ==
=== Roster ===
VPI 1917 roster
Quarterback: William Lybrook; Guards: Henry Lester; Walter Rangely; Tackles: Hank Crisp; Guy McNeil; Harry Parrish (Capt.); Center: Ralph Currie; Ends: Edwin Roden; William L. Younger	Halfbacks: John Benner; Eugene Bock; Philip Peyton; Fullback: Robert Godsey; Substitutes: John Franklin Chapman; Charles; Eldridge; James Thomas Hardwick; Hitchens; Matthews; Mckann	Victor Henry Miller; B. Parrish; John Temple Powers; Robinson; H. Douglas Roden; Robert W. Thornton; Ward; Wiegel; Mathew Philip Will; Willis; Wills; Harry Robert Yates; Young

=== Monogram Club members ===
Fourteen players received monograms for their participation on the 1917 VPI team.

Player	Hometown	Notes
John Rueben Benner		
Eugene Darrington Bock		
Hank Crisp	Crisp, North Carolina	
Ralph Purlius Currie		
Robert Darlin Godsey		
Henry Claybrook Lester		
William Murry Lybrook	Blacksburg, Virginia	
Guy Eugene McNeil		
Harry Temple Parrish	Bristol, Virginia	
Philip Aylett Peyton		
Walter Weiss Rangely		
Edwin Lee Roden	Richmond, Virginia	
Harry Douglas Roden	Richmond, Virginia	
William Lee Younger	Lynchburg, Virginia	

== Coaching and training staff ==
- Head coach: Charles A. Bernier
- Manager: William Reid Williams, Jr.
- Assistant managers
  - Fleet Bond Neighbours
  - Harry Luck Rosenbaum
