= List of NC State Wolfpack men's basketball seasons =

This is a list of seasons completed by the NC State Wolfpack men's basketball team. The Wolfpack won the NCAA championship in 1974 and 1983. The team competed in the Southern Conference until becoming a charter member of the Atlantic Coast Conference in 1953. NC State has won the ACC men's basketball tournament eleven times, which is the third most of any school in the conference.

== Season-by-season results ==
Record table
Season	Coach	Overall	Conference	Standing	Postseason
Piggy Hargrove (Independent) (1910–1912)
1910–11	Piggy Hargrove	1–1			
1911–12	Piggy Hargrove	0–6			
Piggy Hargrove:		1–7			
Chuck Sandborn (Independent) (1912–1913)
1912–13	Chuck Sandborn	4–7			
John Hegarty (Independent) (1913–1914)
1913–14	John Hegarty	5–8			
John Hegarty:		5–8			
H.S. Tucker (Independent) (1914–1915)
1914–15	H.S. Tucker	5–5			
H.S. Tucker:		5–5			
Chuck Sandborn (Independent) (1915–1916)
1915–16	Chuck Sandborn	7–6			
Chuck Sandborn:		11–13			
Harry Hartsell (Independent) (1916–1918)
1916–17	Harry Hartsell	10–8			
1917–18	Harry Hartsell	12–2			
Tal Stafford (Independent) (1918–1919)
1918–19	Tal Stafford	11–3			
Tal Stafford:		11–3			
Richard Crozier (Independent) (1919–1921)
1919–20	Richard Crozier	11–5			
1920–21	Richard Crozier	6–14			
Harry Hartsell (Southern Conference) (1921–1923)
1921–22	Harry Hartsell	6–13	1–5	11th	
1922–23	Harry Hartsell	5–8	1–2	T–12th	
Harry Hartsell:		33–31	2–7		
Richard Crozier (Southern Conference) (1923–1924)
1923–24	Richard Crozier	7–16	2–4	T–12th	
Richard Crozier:		24–35	2–4		
Gus Tebell (Southern Conference) (1924–1930)
1924–25	Gus Tebell	11–7	1–4	T–14th	
1925–26	Gus Tebell	20–4	5–3	T–7th	
1926–27	Gus Tebell	12–5	5–2	6th	
1927–28	Gus Tebell	10–8	3–6	14th	
1928–29	Gus Tebell	15–6	6–5	11th	
1929–30	Gus Tebell	11–6	7–5	11th	
Gus Tebell:		79–36	27–25		
R.R. Sermon (Southern Conference) (1930–1940)
1930–31	R.R. Sermon	8–8	5–5	11th	
1931–32	R.R. Sermon	10–6	6–4	10th	
1932–33	R.R. Sermon	11–8	6–3	4th	
1933–34	R.R. Sermon	11–6	6–5	5th	
1934–35	R.R. Sermon	10–9	6–5	6th	
1935–36	R.R. Sermon	15–4	10–3	3rd	
1936–37	R.R. Sermon	15–9	14–7	4th	
1937–38	R.R. Sermon	13–6	10–3	2nd	
1938–39	R.R. Sermon	10–7	7–6	6th	
1939–40	R.R. Sermon	8–11	5–10	11th	
R.R. Sermon:		111–74	75–51		
Bob Warren (Southern Conference) (1940–1942)
1940–41	Bob Warren	6–9	6–9	11th	
1941–42	Bob Warren	15–7	9–4	4th	
Bob Warren:		21–16	15–13		
Leroy Jay (Southern Conference) (1942–1946)
1942–43	Leroy Jay	7–9	7–5	T–7th	
1943–44	Leroy Jay	5–13	2–5	9th	
1944–45	Leroy Jay	10–11	7–5	6th	
1945–46	Leroy Jay	6–12	5–7	T–9th	
Leroy Jay:		28–45	21–22		
Everett Case (Southern Conference) (1946–1953)
1946–47	Everett Case	26–5	11–2	1st	NIT Third Place
1947–48	Everett Case	29–3	12–0	1st	NIT Quarterfinal
1948–49	Everett Case	25–8	14–1	1st	
1949–50	Everett Case	27–6	12–2	1st	NCAA Final Four
1950–51	Everett Case	30–7	13–1	1st	NCAA Elite Eight
1951–52	Everett Case	24–10	12–2	2nd	NCAA First Round
1952–53	Everett Case	26–6	13–3	1st	
Everett Case:			87–11		
Everett Case (Atlantic Coast Conference) (1953–1964)
1953–54	Everett Case	26–7	5–3	4th	NCAA Sweet Sixteen
1954–55	Everett Case	28–4	12–2	1st	
1955–56	Everett Case	24–4	11–3	1st	NCAA First Round
1956–57	Everett Case	15–11	7–7	T–4th	
1957–58	Everett Case	18–6	10–4	3rd	
1958–59	Everett Case	22–4	12–2	T–1st	
1959–60	Everett Case	11–15	5–9	6th	
1960–61	Everett Case	16–9	8–6	4th	
1961–62	Everett Case	11–6	10–4	3rd	
1962–63	Everett Case	10–11	5–9	T–4th	
1963–64	Everett Case	8–11	4–10	T–7th	
1964–65	Everett Case; Press Maravich	21–5^{[Note A]}	10–4	T–2nd	
Everett Case:		377–134	89–60		
Press Maravich (Atlantic Coast Conference) (1964–1966)
1965–66	Press Maravich	18–9	9–5	2nd	
Press Maravich:		38–13	19–8		
Norm Sloan (Atlantic Coast Conference) (1966–1980)
1966–67	Norm Sloan	7–19	2–12	8th	
1967–68	Norm Sloan	16–10	9–5	T–3rd	
1968–69	Norm Sloan	15–10	8–6	T–3rd	
1969–70	Norm Sloan	23–7	9–5	T–2nd	NCAA University Division Sweet Sixteen
1970–71	Norm Sloan	13–14	5–9	T–6th	
1971–72	Norm Sloan	16–10	6–6	T–4th	
1972–73	Norm Sloan	27–0	12–0	1st	Ineligible^{[Note B]}
1973–74	Norm Sloan	30–1	12–0	1st	NCAA Division I Champion
1974–75	Norm Sloan	22–6	8–4	T–2nd	
1975–76	Norm Sloan	21–9	7–5	T–2nd	NIT Third Place
1976–77	Norm Sloan	17–11	6–6	5th	
1977–78	Norm Sloan	21–10	7–5	T–2nd	NIT Runner-up
1978–79	Norm Sloan	18–12	3–9	T–6th	
1979–80	Norm Sloan	20–8	9–5	T–2nd	NCAA Division I Second Round
Norm Sloan:		266–127	103–77		
Jim Valvano (Atlantic Coast Conference) (1980–1990)
1980–81	Jim Valvano	14–13	4–10	7th	
1981–82	Jim Valvano	22–10	7–7	4th	NCAA Division I First Round
1982–83	Jim Valvano	26–10	8–6	T–3rd	NCAA Division I Champion
1983–84	Jim Valvano	19–14	4–10	7th	NIT First Round
1984–85	Jim Valvano	23–10	9–5	T–1st	NCAA Division I Elite Eight
1985–86	Jim Valvano	21–13	7–7	T–4th	NCAA Division I Elite Eight
1986–87	Jim Valvano	20–15	6–8	6th	NCAA Division I First Round
1987–88	Jim Valvano	24–8	10–4	2nd	NCAA Division I First Round
1988–89	Jim Valvano	22–9	10–4	1st	NCAA Division I Sweet Sixteen
1989–90	Jim Valvano	18–12	6–8	T–5th	
Jim Valvano:		209–114	71–69		
Les Robinson (Atlantic Coast Conference) (1990–1996)
1990–91	Les Robinson	20–11	8–6	T–3rd	NCAA Division I Second Round
1991–92	Les Robinson	12–18	6–10	7th	
1992–93	Les Robinson	8–19	2–14	T–8th	
1993–94	Les Robinson	11–19	5–11	9th	
1994–95	Les Robinson	12–15	4–12	8th	
1995–96	Les Robinson	15–16	3–13	9th	
Les Robinson:		78–98	28–66		
Herb Sendek (Atlantic Coast Conference) (1996–2006)
1996–97	Herb Sendek	17–15	4–12	8th	NIT Second Round
1997–98	Herb Sendek	17–15	5–11	8th	NIT Second Round
1998–99	Herb Sendek	19–14	6–10	5th	NIT Second Round
1999–00	Herb Sendek	20–14	6–10	6th	NIT Fourth Place
2000–01	Herb Sendek	13–16	5–11	7th	
2001–02	Herb Sendek	23–11	9–7	T–3rd	NCAA Division I Second Round
2002–03	Herb Sendek	18–13	9–7	4th	NCAA Division I First Round
2003–04	Herb Sendek	21–10	11–5	2nd	NCAA Division I Second Round
2004–05	Herb Sendek	21–14	7–9	T–6th	NCAA Division I Sweet Sixteen
2005–06	Herb Sendek	22–10	10–6	4th	NCAA Division I Second Round
Herb Sendek:		191–132	72–88		
Sidney Lowe (Atlantic Coast Conference) (2006–2011)
2006–07	Sidney Lowe	20–16	5–11	T–10th	NIT Quarterfinal
2007–08	Sidney Lowe	15–16	4–12	T–11th	
2008–09	Sidney Lowe	16–14	6–10	10th	
2009–10	Sidney Lowe	20–16	5–11	T–9th	NIT Second Round
2010–11	Sidney Lowe	15–16	5–11	T–10th	
Sidney Lowe:		86–78	25–55		
Mark Gottfried (Atlantic Coast Conference) (2011–2017)
2011–12	Mark Gottfried	24–13	9–7	T–4th	NCAA Division I Sweet Sixteen
2012–13	Mark Gottfried	24–11	11–7	T–4th	NCAA Division I Second Round
2013–14	Mark Gottfried	22–14	9–9	T–7th	NCAA Division I Second Round
2014–15	Mark Gottfried	22–14	10–8	T–6th	NCAA Division I Sweet Sixteen
2015–16	Mark Gottfried	16–17	5–13	13th	
2016–17	Mark Gottfried	15–17	4–14	13th	
Mark Gottfried:		123–86	48–58		
Kevin Keatts (Atlantic Coast Conference) (2017–2025)
2017–18	Kevin Keatts	21–12	11–7	T–3rd	NCAA Division I First Round
2018–19	Kevin Keatts	24–12	9–9	T–8th	NIT Quarterfinal
2019–20	Kevin Keatts	20–12	10–10	T–6th	No postseason held
2020–21	Kevin Keatts	14–11	9–8	9th	NIT Quarterfinal
2021–22	Kevin Keatts	11–21	4–16	15th	
2022–23	Kevin Keatts	23–11	12–8	6th	NCAA Division I First Round
2023–24	Kevin Keatts	26–15	9–11	10th	NCAA Division I Final Four
2024–25	Kevin Keatts	12–19	5–15	16th	
Kevin Keatts:		151–113	69–84		
Will Wade (Atlantic Coast Conference) (2025–present)
2025–26	Will Wade	20–14	10–8	T–7th	NCAA Division I First Four
Will Wade:		20–14	10–8		
Total:		1,837–1,158			
National champion Postseason invitational champion Conference regular season champion Conference regular season and conference tournament champion Division regular season champion Division regular season and conference tournament champion Conference tournament champion

^A. Everett Case coached the first two games of the 1964–65 season and had a record of 1–1 (0–1 in the ACC) during those two games.
^B. The 1972–73 was forced to skip postseason play due to an NCAA recruiting infraction. Assistant coach Eddie Biedenbach had played in a pick-up basketball game with David Thompson on a recruiting visit to Raleigh, North Carolina. The Wolfpack finished the season undefeated at 27–0 but forfeited the opportunity to compete for the national championship.
