= 1917 Davidson Wildcats football team =

American college football season

1917 Davidson Wildcats football
- Conference: South Atlantic Intercollegiate Athletic Association
- Record: 6–4 (1–2 SAIAA)
- Head coach: Bill Fetzer (3rd season)
- Captain: George M. King
- Home stadium: Sprunt Field

1917 South Atlantic Intercollegiate Athletic Association football standings
	Conf.					Overall
Team	W		L		T	W		L		T
Georgetown $	2	–	0	–	0	8	–	1	–	0
Richmond	2	–	1	–	0	4	–	2	–	1
Washington and Lee	2	–	1	–	0	4	–	3	–	0
North Carolina A&M	2	–	1	–	1	6	–	2	–	1
VPI	2	–	1	–	1	6	–	2	–	1
Maryland State	2	–	1	–	1	4	–	3	–	1
Davidson	1	–	2	–	0	6	–	4	–	0
VMI	1	–	3	–	1	4	–	4	–	1
St. John's (MD)	0	–	1	–	0	0	–	1	–	0
Johns Hopkins	0	–	1	–	0	0	–	3	–	0
William & Mary	0	–	3	–	0	3	–	5	–	0
$ – Conference champion

The 1917 Davidson Wildcats football team represented Davidson University in the 1917 college football season. Led by third year coach Bill Fetzer, the Wildcats competed as a member of the South Atlantic Intercollegiate Athletic Association (SAIAA). Despite a record of 6–4 (1–2 SAIAA), some would call Davidson the second best southern team that year. Davidson defeated Auburn 21 to 7, in one of the great upsets in Southern football history, and scored the most on the 1917 Georgia Tech Golden Tornado, for many years considered the greatest football team the South ever produced, in a 32 to 10 loss. Following the Auburn game the Davidson team was first referred to as "the Wildcats.

The team included a 17-year-old Buck Flowers, and two other All-Southerns in Wooly Grey and captain Georgie King. The backfield consisted of Flowers, quarterback Henry Spann, halfback Jack Black, and fullback Buck Burns.

== Schedule ==
Date	Time	Opponent	Site	Result	Attendance	Source
September 29		at Navy*	Worden Field; Annapolis, MD	L 6–27		
October 6		at North Carolina A&M	Riddick Stadium; Raleigh, NC	L 3–7		
October 13		at Georgia Tech*	Grant Field; Atlanta, GA	L 10–32		
October 20		at VPI	Miles Field; Blacksburg, VA	L 7–13		
October 27		vs. VMI	Wearn Field; Charlotte, NC	W 23–7		
November 3		at Furman*	Riverside Park; Greenville, SC	W 28–7		
November 10	2:30 p.m.	vs. Auburn*	Grant Field; Atlanta, GA	W 21–7		
November 17		vs. Wake Forest*	Cone Athletic Park (II); Greensboro, NC	W 72–7	300–400	
November 23		Wofford*	Sprunt Field; Davidson, NC	W 62–0		
November 29		vs. Clemson*	Wearn Field; Charlotte, NC	W 21–9		
*Non-conference game; All times are in Eastern time

== Season summary ==
=== Week 3: at Georgia Tech ===
Davidson scored the most on the south's first national champion – Georgia Tech, for many years considered the greatest football team the South ever produced, in a 32 to 10 loss. This was the only game none of Tech's backs gained 100 yards rushing. Tech only led 6 to 3 until Everett Strupper broke open the game in the second half. Davidson got desperate and tried the pass, getting to within the 15-yard line. Walker Carpenter broke through the line and got a 10-yard loss.

Davidson captain Georgie King said "I consider Georgia Tech the best football team I have ever played against or ever expect to play against."

=== Week 7: Auburn ===
Week 7: Davidson at Auburn

Team	1	2	3	4	Total
• Davidson	0	7	7	7	21
Auburn	0	0	7	0	7

- Date: November 10
- Location: Atlanta, GA
- Referee: Lewis (Virginia)

Auburn was involved in of the great upsets in Southern football history as the Wildcats bested the Auburn Tigers 21–7.

=== Week 10: Clemson ===
Week 10: Clemson at Davidson

Team	1	2	3	4	Total
Clemson	9	0	0	0	9
• Davidson	7	0	14	0	21

- Date: November 29
- Location: Charlotte, NC
- Referee: Williams

Davidson beat Clemson 21–9 on a soggy field. Tackle Douglas Elliott broke his leg below the knee in the second quarter. King scored two touchdowns and Flowers another. Clemson's score followed a kick return by Stumpy Banks to the 4-yard line.

The starting lineup was King (left end), Shaw (left tackle), Gray (left guard), D. Crouch (center), McMaster (right guard), Elliott (right tackle), Roberts (right end), Spann (quarterback), McAlester (left halfback), Thomas (right halfback), Burns (fullback).
