= 1917 Oglethorpe Stormy Petrels football team =

American college football season

1917 Oglethorpe Stormy Petrels football
- Conference: Independent
- Record: 1–2
- Head coach: Frank B. Anderson (1st season)
- Captain: W. J. Boswell
- Home stadium: Oglethorpe University Field

1917 Southern college football independents records
	Conf.			Overall
Team	W	L	T	W		L		T
Middle Tennessee State Normal		–		7	–	0	–	0
Presbyterian		–		8	–	1	–	0
Navy		–		7	–	1	–	0
North Texas State Normal		–		6	–	1	–	0
Spring Hill		–		4	–	2	–	0
West Virginia		–		6	–	3	–	1
Southwest Texas State		–		5	–	3	–	0
West Tennessee State Normal		–		3	–	2	–	0
Texas Mines		–		0	–	0	–	1
Kentucky		–		3	–	5	–	1
Oglethorpe		–		1	–	2	–	0
Sam Houston Normal		–		1	–	3	–	0
Wake Forest		–		1	–	6	–	1
Marshall		–		1	–	7	–	1
Tennessee (SATC)		–		0	–	3	–	0

The 1917 Oglethorpe Stormy Petrels football team represented Oglethorpe University in the sport of American football during the 1917 college football season. In October 1917, Coach Frank B. Anderson held a meeting at Oglethorpe concerning the possibility of football team. Approximately 70 boys were enrolled at the newly re-founded Oglethorpe—20 of which were ready to begin Oglethorpe's inaugural season.

== Schedule ==
Date	Opponent	Site	Result	Source
October 13	Fifth District A&M School	Oglethorpe University Field; Atlanta, GA	W 18–0	
October 24	at Camp Gordon	Parade Field; Camp Gordon, GA	L 0–54	
November 10	at North Georgia	Dahlonega, GA	L 0–18	
