= 1917 Marshall Thundering Herd football team =

American college football season

1917 Marshall Thundering Herd football
- Conference: Independent
- Record: 1–7–1
- Head coach: Burton Shipley (1st season)
- Captain: Morris Foose
- Home stadium: Central Field

1917 Southern college football independents records
	Conf.			Overall
Team	W	L	T	W		L		T
Middle Tennessee State Normal		–		7	–	0	–	0
Presbyterian		–		8	–	1	–	0
Navy		–		7	–	1	–	0
North Texas State Normal		–		6	–	1	–	0
Spring Hill		–		4	–	2	–	0
West Virginia		–		6	–	3	–	1
Southwest Texas State		–		5	–	3	–	0
West Tennessee State Normal		–		3	–	2	–	0
Texas Mines		–		0	–	0	–	1
Kentucky		–		3	–	5	–	1
Oglethorpe		–		1	–	2	–	0
Sam Houston Normal		–		1	–	3	–	0
Wake Forest		–		1	–	6	–	1
Marshall		–		1	–	7	–	1
Tennessee (SATC)		–		0	–	3	–	0

The 1917 Marshall Thundering Herd football team represented Marshall College (now Marshall University) as an independent during the 1917 college football season. The team posted a 1–7–1 record and was outscored by a total of 345 to 7. The team played its home games on a campus field called "Central Field" which is presently Campus Commons.

== Schedule ==
Date	Opponent	Site	Result
September 30	Rio Grande	Central Field; Huntington, WV	W Forfeit
October 6	at Denison	Granville, OH	L 0–94
October 13	at Marietta	Marietta, OH	L 0–68
October 20	Otterbein	Central Field; Huntington, WV	L 0–37
October 27	at Georgetown (KY)	Georgetown, KY	L 0–61
November 10	at Greenbrier Military Academy	Lewisburg, WV	L 0–38
November 17	at Muskingum		L 0–28
November 24	Morris Harvey	Central Field; Huntington, WV	T 7–7
November 29	Huntington HS^{†}	Central Field; Huntington, WV	L 0–12
^{†}Homecoming
