= 1917 Spring Hill Badgers football team =

American college football season

1917 Spring Hill Badgers football
- Conference: Independent
- Record: 4–2
- Head coach: William S. Hoffman (1st season)
- Captain: Edward O'Dowd
- Home stadium: Maxon Field, Monroe Field

1917 Southern college football independents records
| | Conf. | | | Overall |
| Team | W | L | T | W | | L | | T |
|---|---|---|---|---|---|---|---|---|
| Middle Tennessee State Normal | | – | | 7 | – | 0 | – | 0 |
| Presbyterian | | – | | 8 | – | 1 | – | 0 |
| Navy | | – | | 7 | – | 1 | – | 0 |
| North Texas State Normal | | – | | 6 | – | 1 | – | 0 |
| Spring Hill | | – | | 4 | – | 2 | – | 0 |
| West Virginia | | – | | 6 | – | 3 | – | 1 |
| Southwest Texas State | | – | | 5 | – | 3 | – | 0 |
| West Tennessee State Normal | | – | | 3 | – | 2 | – | 0 |
| Texas Mines | | – | | 0 | – | 0 | – | 1 |
| Kentucky | | – | | 3 | – | 5 | – | 1 |
| Oglethorpe | | – | | 1 | – | 2 | – | 0 |
| Sam Houston Normal | | – | | 1 | – | 3 | – | 0 |
| Wake Forest | | – | | 1 | – | 6 | – | 1 |
| Marshall | | – | | 1 | – | 7 | – | 1 |
| Tennessee (SATC) | | – | | 0 | – | 3 | – | 0 |

The 1917 Spring Hill Badgers football team represented the Spring Hill College as an independent during the 1917 college football season.

== Schedule ==
| Date | Time | Opponent | Site | Result | Source |
|---|---|---|---|---|---|
| | | Gulf Coast Military Academy | | W 12–7 | |
| October 13 | | Tulane | Tulane Stadium; New Orleans, LA | L 0–28 | |
| October 27 | | Southwestern Louisiana Industrial | Monroe Field; Mobile, AL | W 6–0 | |
| | | Marion | | L 6–14 | |
| | | Perkinston | Maxon Field; Mobile, AL | W 47–0 | |
| November 29 | 2:30 p.m. | Howard (AL) | Monroe Field; Mobile, AL | W 12–7 | |
All times are in Central time
