= 1917 Wake Forest Baptists football team =

American college football season

1917 Wake Forest Baptists football
- Conference: Independent
- Record: 1–6–1
- Head coach: E. T. MacDonnell (1st season)
- Captain: Ashley D. Pace

1917 Southern college football independents records
	Conf.			Overall
Team	W	L	T	W		L		T
Middle Tennessee State Normal		–		7	–	0	–	0
Presbyterian		–		8	–	1	–	0
Navy		–		7	–	1	–	0
North Texas State Normal		–		6	–	1	–	0
Spring Hill		–		4	–	2	–	0
West Virginia		–		6	–	3	–	1
Southwest Texas State		–		5	–	3	–	0
West Tennessee State Normal		–		3	–	2	–	0
Texas Mines		–		0	–	0	–	1
Kentucky		–		3	–	5	–	1
Oglethorpe		–		1	–	2	–	0
Sam Houston Normal		–		1	–	3	–	0
Wake Forest		–		1	–	6	–	1
Marshall		–		1	–	7	–	1
Tennessee (SATC)		–		0	–	3	–	0

The 1917 Wake Forest Baptists football team was an American football team that represented Wake Forest College (now known as Wake Forest University) as an independent during the 1917 college football season. In their first year under head coach E. T. MacDonnell, the team compiled a 1–6–1 record.

== Schedule ==
Date	Opponent	Site	Result	Attendance	Source
September 29	at Georgia Tech	Grant Field; Atlanta, GA	L 0–33		
October 6	at Furman	Riverside Park; Greenville, SC	L 6–7		
October 13	Guilford	Wake Forest, NC	W 20–0		
October 18	at North Carolina A&M	Riddick Stadium; Raleigh, NC (rivalry)	L 6–17		
October 27	at Maryland State	College Park, MD	L 13–29		
November 3	at VPI	Miles Field; Blacksburg, VA	L 0–50		
November 17	vs. Davidson	Cone Athletic Park (II); Greensboro, NC	L 7–72	300–400	
November 29	vs. Hampden–Sydney	League Park; Norfolk, VA	T 7–7		
