= 1917 Richmond Spiders football team =

American college football season

1917 Richmond Spiders football
- Conference: Eastern Virginia Intercollegiate Athletic Association, South Atlantic Intercollegiate Athletic Association
- Record: 4–2–1 (4–1–1 EVIAA, 2–1 SAIAA)
- Head coach: Frank Dobson (5th season)
- Captain: Robert Whittet Jr.
- Home stadium: Boulevard Field

1917 Eastern Virginia Intercollegiate Athletic Association football standings
	Conf.					Overall
Team	W		L		T	W		L		T
Hampden–Sydney $	5	–	0	–	1	5	–	2	–	2
Richmond	4	–	1	–	1	4	–	2	–	1
William & Mary	2	–	4	–	0	3	–	5	–	0
Randolph–Macon	0	–	6	–	0	0	–	0	–	7
$ – Conference champion

1917 South Atlantic Intercollegiate Athletic Association football standings
	Conf.					Overall
Team	W		L		T	W		L		T
Georgetown $	2	–	0	–	0	8	–	1	–	0
Richmond	2	–	1	–	0	4	–	2	–	1
Washington and Lee	2	–	1	–	0	4	–	3	–	0
North Carolina A&M	2	–	1	–	1	6	–	2	–	1
VPI	2	–	1	–	1	6	–	2	–	1
Maryland State	2	–	1	–	1	4	–	3	–	1
Davidson	1	–	2	–	0	6	–	4	–	0
VMI	1	–	3	–	1	4	–	4	–	1
St. John's (MD)	0	–	1	–	0	0	–	1	–	0
Johns Hopkins	0	–	1	–	0	0	–	3	–	0
William & Mary	0	–	3	–	0	3	–	5	–	0
$ – Conference champion

The 1917 Richmond Spiders football team was an American football team that represented Richmond College—now known as the University of Richmond—as a member of the Eastern Virginia Intercollegiate Athletic Association (EVIAA) and the South Atlantic Intercollegiate Athletic Association (SAIAA) during the 1917 college football season. Led by fifth-year head coach Frank Dobson, Richmond finished the season 4–2–1 overall, 4–1–1 in EVIAA play, and 2–1 against SAIAA opponents.

== Schedule ==
Date	Opponent	Site	Result	Source
October 13	William & Mary	Boulevard Field; Richmond, VA (rivalry)	W 28–0	
October 20	Hampden–Sydney	Boulevard Field; Richmond, VA	L 0–12	
October 27	Randolph–Macon	Richmond, VA	W 27–0	
November 3	at Washington and Lee	Lexington, Virginia	L 0–43	
November 10	at Hampden–Sydney	Hampden Sydney, VA	T 0–0	
November 17	at William & Mary	Williamsburg, VA	W 19–0	
November 24	Randolph–Macon	Richmond, VA	W 80–0	
