= 1917 Texas Mines Miners football team =

American college football season

1917 Texas Mines Miners football
- Conference: Independent
- Record: 0–0–1
- Head coach: Tommy Dwyer (4th season)

1917 Southern college football independents records
	Conf.			Overall
Team	W	L	T	W		L		T
Middle Tennessee State Normal		–		7	–	0	–	0
Presbyterian		–		8	–	1	–	0
Navy		–		7	–	1	–	0
North Texas State Normal		–		6	–	1	–	0
Spring Hill		–		4	–	2	–	0
West Virginia		–		6	–	3	–	1
Southwest Texas State		–		5	–	3	–	0
West Tennessee State Normal		–		3	–	2	–	0
Texas Mines		–		0	–	0	–	1
Kentucky		–		3	–	5	–	1
Oglethorpe		–		1	–	2	–	0
Sam Houston Normal		–		1	–	3	–	0
Wake Forest		–		1	–	6	–	1
Marshall		–		1	–	7	–	1
Tennessee (SATC)		–		0	–	3	–	0

The 1917 Texas Mines Miners football team was an American football team that represented the Texas School of Mines (now known as the University of Texas at El Paso) as an independent during the 1917 college football season. In their fourth year under head coach Tommy Dwyer, the team compiled a 0–0–1 record.

== Schedule ==
Opponent	Site	Result
at El Paso High School	El Paso HS Stadium; El Paso, TX	T 0–0
