= George M. King =

American football player (1896–1963)

Profile
- Position: End

Personal information
- Born: June 21, 1896; Bristol, Tennessee, US
- Died: 1963

Career information
- College: Davidson (1917)

Awards and highlights
- All-Southern (1917); Davidson Athletics Hall of Fame

George Millard King (June 21, 1896 – 1963) was an American college football player. He was president of King Brothers Shoe Co. in Bristol, Tennessee until his death in 1963. He was a member of the Davidson College Board of Trustees and was President of the Davidson College Alumni Association in 1954–55.

== Davidson ==
King was a prominent end for the Davidson Wildcats of Davidson University.

=== 1917 ===
He King captain of the team in 1917, a year in which he was selected All-Southern. Of the Georgia Tech team, the first national champion from the South and for many years considered the greatest football team the South ever produced, whose closest game was a 32 to 10 victory over Davidson, King said “I consider Georgia Tech the best football team I have ever played against or ever expect to play against.” One description reads "King's catch of a pass in the Georgia Tech game, with a gallop for a touchdown, was almost miraculous". King participated in one of the great upsets in Southern football history as the Wildcats bested the Auburn Tigers 21–7. King scored one touchdown off a muffed punt, and would've had another on a pass reception had he not fumbled the ball out of the endzone. As Auburn was considered second best in the south at the time, some would call Davidson the second best southern team that year. H. M. Grey and a young Buck Flowers were Davidson teammates.
