= 1917 Sam Houston Normal football team =

American college football season

1917 Sam Houston Normal football
- Conference: Independent
- Record: 1–3
- Head coach: Gene Berry (4th season)

1917 Southern college football independents records
	Conf.			Overall
Team	W	L	T	W		L		T
Middle Tennessee State Normal		–		7	–	0	–	0
Presbyterian		–		8	–	1	–	0
Navy		–		7	–	1	–	0
North Texas State Normal		–		6	–	1	–	0
Spring Hill		–		4	–	2	–	0
West Virginia		–		6	–	3	–	1
Southwest Texas State		–		5	–	3	–	0
West Tennessee State Normal		–		3	–	2	–	0
Texas Mines		–		0	–	0	–	1
Kentucky		–		3	–	5	–	1
Oglethorpe		–		1	–	2	–	0
Sam Houston Normal		–		1	–	3	–	0
Wake Forest		–		1	–	6	–	1
Marshall		–		1	–	7	–	1
Tennessee (SATC)		–		0	–	3	–	0

The 1917 Sam Houston Normal football team represented Sam Houston Normal Institute—now known as Sam Houston State University—as an independent during the 1917 college football season. Led by fourth-year head coach Gene Berry, Sam Houston Normal compiled a record of 1–3.

== Schedule ==
Date	Opponent	Site	Result	Source
October 16	Huntsville High School	Huntsville, TX	W 6–0	
November 5	at Rusk Academy	Rusk, TX	L 0–55	
November 19	at Southwest Texas State	San Marcos, TX (rivalry)	L 0–25	
November 24	Texas Irregulars	Huntsville, TX	L 7–35	
