= 1917 North Carolina A&M Aggies football team =

American college football season

1917 North Carolina A&M Aggies football
- Conference: South Atlantic Intercollegiate Athletic Association
- Record: 6–2–1 (2–1–1 SAIAA)
- Head coach: Harry Hartsell (1st season)
- Home stadium: Riddick Stadium

1917 South Atlantic Intercollegiate Athletic Association football standings
	Conf.					Overall
Team	W		L		T	W		L		T
Georgetown $	2	–	0	–	0	8	–	1	–	0
Richmond	2	–	1	–	0	4	–	2	–	1
Washington and Lee	2	–	1	–	0	4	–	3	–	0
North Carolina A&M	2	–	1	–	1	6	–	2	–	1
VPI	2	–	1	–	1	6	–	2	–	1
Maryland State	2	–	1	–	1	4	–	3	–	1
Davidson	1	–	2	–	0	6	–	4	–	0
VMI	1	–	3	–	1	4	–	4	–	1
St. John's (MD)	0	–	1	–	0	0	–	1	–	0
Johns Hopkins	0	–	1	–	0	0	–	3	–	0
William & Mary	0	–	3	–	0	3	–	5	–	0
$ – Conference champion

The 1917 North Carolina A&M Aggies football team was an American football team that represented North Carolina College of Agriculture and Mechanic Arts (later renamed North Carolina State University) during the 1917 college football season. In Harry Hartsell's first season (and first stint, as he would leave and then return for the 1921–1923 seasons), the coach managed to garner a winning record for the Aggies for the first time since the 1913 SAIAA champion team, and tied the record for most wins in a season at 6 (other 6-win seasons as of 1917 were 1907–09, and 1913).

== Schedule ==
Date	Time	Opponent	Site	Result	Attendance	Source
September 29		Guilford*	Riddick Stadium; Raleigh, NC	W 19–0		
October 5		Davidson	Riddick Stadium; Raleigh, NC	W 7–3		
October 13		Roanoke*	Riddick Stadium; Raleigh, NC	W 28–0		
October 18		Wake Forest*	Riddick Stadium; Raleigh, NC (rivalry)	W 17–6		
October 27		at Washington and Lee	Wilson Field; Lexington, VA	L 7–28		
November 3		at Maryland State*	Central High School Stadium; Washington, DC	W 10–6		
November 10		vs. VMI	Boulevard Field; Richmond, VA	W 17–0		
November 17	2:30 p.m.	vs. VPI	League Park; Norfolk, VA	T 7–7	3,500	
November 29		at West Virginia*	Morgantown, WV	L 0–21		
*Non-conference game
