= 1917 West Virginia Mountaineers football team =

American college football season

1917 West Virginia Mountaineers football
- Conference: Independent
- Record: 6–3–1
- Head coach: Mont McIntire (2nd season)
- Captain: Russell Bailey

1917 Southern college football independents records
	Conf.			Overall
Team	W	L	T	W		L		T
Middle Tennessee State Normal		–		7	–	0	–	0
Presbyterian		–		8	–	1	–	0
Navy		–		7	–	1	–	0
North Texas State Normal		–		6	–	1	–	0
Spring Hill		–		4	–	2	–	0
West Virginia		–		6	–	3	–	1
Southwest Texas State		–		5	–	3	–	0
West Tennessee State Normal		–		3	–	2	–	0
Texas Mines		–		0	–	0	–	1
Kentucky		–		3	–	5	–	1
Oglethorpe		–		1	–	2	–	0
Sam Houston Normal		–		1	–	3	–	0
Wake Forest		–		1	–	6	–	1
Marshall		–		1	–	7	–	1
Tennessee (SATC)		–		0	–	3	–	0

The 1917 West Virginia Mountaineers football team was an American football team that represented West Virginia University as an independent during the 1917 college football season. In its second season under head coach Mont McIntire, the team compiled a 6–3–1 record and outscored opponents by a total of 161 to 50.

== Schedule ==
Date	Opponent	Site	Result	Attendance	Source
September 29	Pittsburgh	University Athletic Field; Morgantown, WV (rivalry)	L 9–14	4,000–5,000	
October 6	at Navy	Worden Field; Annapolis, MD	W 7–0		
October 13	Carlisle	Athletic Field; Morgantown, WV	W 21–0		
October 20	at Dartmouth	Alumni Oval; Hanover, NH	L 2–6		
October 27	Gettysburg	Athletic Field; Morgantown, WV	W 60–0		
November 3	at Rutgers	Neilson Field; New Brunswick, NJ	T 7–7		
November 10	vs. VPI	League Park; Huntington, WV (rivalry)	W 27–3	4,000	
November 17	vs. Washington & Jefferson	Fairmont, WV	W 7–0		
November 24	vs. West Virginia Wesleyan	Clarksburg, WV	L 0–20		
November 29	North Carolina A&M	Athletic Field; Morgantown, WV	W 21–0		
