= 1917 Maryland State Aggies football team =

American college football season

1917 Maryland State Aggies football
- Conference: South Atlantic Intercollegiate Athletic Association
- Record: 4–3–1 (2–1–1 SAIAA)
- Head coach: Curley Byrd (7th season)

1917 South Atlantic Intercollegiate Athletic Association football standings
	Conf.					Overall
Team	W		L		T	W		L		T
Georgetown $	2	–	0	–	0	8	–	1	–	0
Richmond	2	–	1	–	0	4	–	2	–	1
Washington and Lee	2	–	1	–	0	4	–	3	–	0
North Carolina A&M	2	–	1	–	1	6	–	2	–	1
VPI	2	–	1	–	1	6	–	2	–	1
Maryland State	2	–	1	–	1	4	–	3	–	1
Davidson	1	–	2	–	0	6	–	4	–	0
VMI	1	–	3	–	1	4	–	4	–	1
St. John's (MD)	0	–	1	–	0	0	–	1	–	0
Johns Hopkins	0	–	1	–	0	0	–	3	–	0
William & Mary	0	–	3	–	0	3	–	5	–	0
$ – Conference champion

The 1917 Maryland State Aggies football team was an American football team that represented Maryland State College (which in 1920 became part of the University of Maryland) in the South Atlantic Intercollegiate Athletic Association (SAIAA) during the 1917 college football season. In their seventh season under head coach Curley Byrd, the Aggies compiled a 4–3–1 record and were outscored by a total of 159 to 89. The team won games against Delaware (20–0), Wake Forest (29–13), St. John's College (13–3), and Johns Hopkins (7–0), lost to Navy (62–0), North Carolina A&M (10–6), and Penn State (57–0), and played VMI to a tie (14–14).

== Schedule ==
Date	Time	Opponent	Site	Result	Attendance	Source
October 6		Delaware*	College Park, MD	W 20–0		
October 13		at Navy*	Worden Field; Annapolis, MD	L 0–62		
October 20		at VMI	VMI Parade Ground; Lexington, VA	T 14–14		
October 27		Wake Forest*	College Park, MD	W 29–13		
November 3		vs. North Carolina A&M	Central High School Stadium; Washington, DC	L 6–10		
November 10		St. John's (MD)	College Park, MD	W 13–3		
November 17		at Penn State*	New Beaver Field; State College, PA (rivalry)	L 0–57		
November 29	2:30 p.m.	at Johns Hopkins	Homewood Field; Baltimore, MD	W 7–0	2,500	
*Non-conference game
