= 1917 North Texas State Normal football team =

American college football season

1917 North Texas State Normal football
- Conference: Independent
- Record: 6–1
- Head coach: James W. St. Clair (3rd season)
- Home stadium: Eagle Field

1917 Southern college football independents records
	Conf.			Overall
Team	W	L	T	W		L		T
Middle Tennessee State Normal		–		7	–	0	–	0
Presbyterian		–		8	–	1	–	0
Navy		–		7	–	1	–	0
North Texas State Normal		–		6	–	1	–	0
Spring Hill		–		4	–	2	–	0
West Virginia		–		6	–	3	–	1
Southwest Texas State		–		5	–	3	–	0
West Tennessee State Normal		–		3	–	2	–	0
Texas Mines		–		0	–	0	–	1
Kentucky		–		3	–	5	–	1
Oglethorpe		–		1	–	2	–	0
Sam Houston Normal		–		1	–	3	–	0
Wake Forest		–		1	–	6	–	1
Marshall		–		1	–	7	–	1
Tennessee (SATC)		–		0	–	3	–	0

The 1917 North Texas State Normal football team represented North Texas State Normal College (now known as the University of North Texas) as an independent during the 1917 college football season. Led by third-year head coach James W. St. Clair, the squad compiled an overall record of 6–1.

== Schedule ==
Date	Opponent	Site	Result	Source
October 1	at Burleson	Greenville, TX	L 0–14	
October 8	at Simmons (TX)	Central Texas Fairgrounds; Abilene, TX	W 14–8	
October 15	Southeastern Oklahoma Normal	Eagle Field; Denton, TX	W 27–0	
October 26	at Austin	Cashion Field; Sherman, TX	W 19–13	
November 5	Decatur Baptist	Eagle Field; Denton, TX	W 34–0	
November 9	Dallas	Eagle Field; Denton, TX	W 13–0	
November 23	Meridian College	Eagle Field; Denton, TX	W 25–7	
