= 1917 Kentucky Wildcats football team =

American college football season

1917 Kentucky Wildcats football
- Conference: Independent
- Record: 3–5–1
- Head coach: Stanley A. Boles (1st season)
- Captain: John Brittain
- Home stadium: Stoll Field

1917 Southern college football independents records
	Conf.			Overall
Team	W	L	T	W		L		T
Middle Tennessee State Normal		–		7	–	0	–	0
Presbyterian		–		8	–	1	–	0
Navy		–		7	–	1	–	0
North Texas State Normal		–		6	–	1	–	0
Spring Hill		–		4	–	2	–	0
West Virginia		–		6	–	3	–	1
Southwest Texas State		–		5	–	3	–	0
West Tennessee State Normal		–		3	–	2	–	0
Texas Mines		–		0	–	0	–	1
Kentucky		–		3	–	5	–	1
Oglethorpe		–		1	–	2	–	0
Sam Houston Normal		–		1	–	3	–	0
Wake Forest		–		1	–	6	–	1
Marshall		–		1	–	7	–	1
Tennessee (SATC)		–		0	–	3	–	0

The 1917 Kentucky Wildcats football team represented the University of Kentucky as an independent during the 1917 college football season. Led by Stanley A. Boles in his first and only season as head coach, the Wildcats compiled a record of 3–5–1. The season ended on a high note with the 52–0 defeat of Florida.

== Schedule ==
Date	Time	Opponent	Site	Result	Source
September 29		Butler*	Stoll Field; Lexington, KY	W 33–0	
October 6		Maryville (TN)*	Stoll Field; Lexington, KY	W 19–0	
October 13		Miami (OH)	Stoll Field; Lexington, KY	T 0–0	
October 20		Vanderbilt	Stoll Field; Lexington, KY (rivalry)	L 0–5	
October 27	3:00 p.m.	vs. Sewanee	Andrews Field; Chattanooga, TN	L 0–7	
November 3		at Centre*	Cheek Field; Danville, KY (rivalry)	L 0–3	
November 10		at Mississippi A&M	New Athletic Field; Starkville, MS	L 0–14	
November 17		Alabama	Stoll Field; Lexington, KY	L 0–27	
November 29		Florida	Stoll Field; Lexington, KY (rivalry)	W 52–0	
*Non-conference game
