= 1917 Southwest Texas State football team =

American college football season

1917 Southwest Texas State football
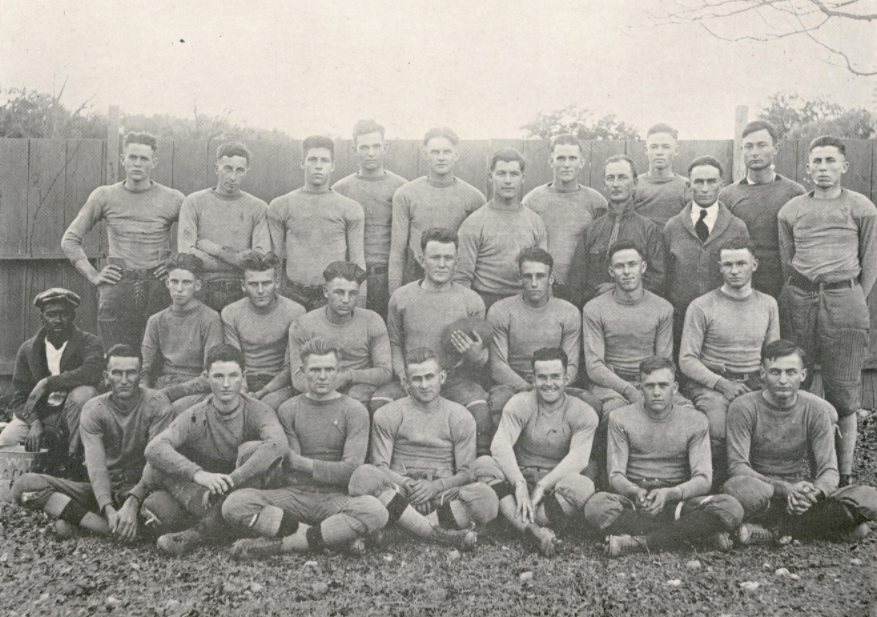
- Conference: Independent
- Record: 5–3
- Head coach: G. B. Marsh (2nd season)
- Captain: McGee

1917 Southern college football independents records
	Conf.			Overall
Team	W	L	T	W		L		T
Middle Tennessee State Normal		–		7	–	0	–	0
Presbyterian		–		8	–	1	–	0
Navy		–		7	–	1	–	0
North Texas State Normal		–		6	–	1	–	0
Spring Hill		–		4	–	2	–	0
West Virginia		–		6	–	3	–	1
Southwest Texas State		–		5	–	3	–	0
West Tennessee State Normal		–		3	–	2	–	0
Texas Mines		–		0	–	0	–	1
Kentucky		–		3	–	5	–	1
Oglethorpe		–		1	–	2	–	0
Sam Houston Normal		–		1	–	3	–	0
Wake Forest		–		1	–	6	–	1
Marshall		–		1	–	7	–	1
Tennessee (SATC)		–		0	–	3	–	0

The 1917 Southwest Texas State football team was an American football team that represented Southwest Texas State Normal School—now known as Texas State University–as an independent during the 1917 college football season. Led by second-year head coach G. B. Marsh, the team finished the season with a record of 5–3. The team's captain was McGree, who played tackle.

== Schedule ==
Date	Opponent	Site	Result	Source
October 15	St. Edward's		W 44–0	
October 19	San Marcos Baptist Academy	Normal grounds; San Marcos, TX	L 0–7	
October 29	Texas JV		L 0–27	
November 3	Meridian		W 13–0	
November 12	San Marcos Baptist Academy		W 3–0	
November 19	Sam Houston Normal	San Marcos, TX (rivalry)	W 25–0	
November 24	Peacock Military Academy		L 0–26	
November 29	Coronal Institute		W 13–0	
