= 1917 VMI Keydets football team =

American college football season

1917 VMI Keydets football
- Conference: South Atlantic Intercollegiate Athletic Association
- Record: 4–4–1 (1–3–1 SAIAA)
- Head coach: Earl Abell (1st season)
- Home stadium: VMI Parade Ground

1917 South Atlantic Intercollegiate Athletic Association football standings
	Conf.					Overall
Team	W		L		T	W		L		T
Georgetown $	2	–	0	–	0	8	–	1	–	0
Richmond	2	–	1	–	0	4	–	2	–	1
Washington and Lee	2	–	1	–	0	4	–	3	–	0
North Carolina A&M	2	–	1	–	1	6	–	2	–	1
VPI	2	–	1	–	1	6	–	2	–	1
Maryland State	2	–	1	–	1	4	–	3	–	1
Davidson	1	–	2	–	0	6	–	4	–	0
VMI	1	–	3	–	1	4	–	4	–	1
St. John's (MD)	0	–	1	–	0	0	–	1	–	0
Johns Hopkins	0	–	1	–	0	0	–	3	–	0
William & Mary	0	–	3	–	0	3	–	5	–	0
$ – Conference champion

The 1917 VMI Keydets football team was an American football team that represented the Virginia Military Institute (VMI) during the 1917 college football season as a member of the South Atlantic Intercollegiate Athletic Association. In their first year under head coach Earl Abell, the team compiled an overall record of 4–4–1.

== Schedule ==
Date	Opponent	Site	Result	Source
September 29	Hampden–Sydney*	VMI Parade Ground; Lexington, VA	W 15–14	
October 6	William & Mary	VMI Parade Ground; Lexington, VA (rivalry)	W 53–0	
October 13	at Army*	The Plain; West Point, NY	L 0–34	
October 20	Maryland State	VMI Parade Ground; Lexington, VA	T 14–14	
October 27	at Davidson	Wearn Field; Charlotte, NC	L 7–23	
November 3	Roanoke*	VMI Parade Ground; Lexington, VA	W 54–0	
November 10	vs. North Carolina A&M	Boulevard Field; Richmond, VA	L 0–17	
November 24	Gallaudet*	VMI Parade Ground; Lexington, VA	W 19–3	
November 29	vs. VPI	Fair Grounds; Roanoke, VA (rivalry)	L 0–6	
*Non-conference game
