= Gene Berry =

American football player and collegiate athletics coach

Biographical details
- Born: December 7, 1891; Cooke County, Texas, U.S.
- Died: November 28, 1968 (aged 76); Huntsville, Texas, U.S.

Playing career

Football
- 1912–1913: Texas
- Position: End

Coaching career (HC unless noted)

Football
- 1914–1919: Sam Houston Normal

Basketball
- 1917–1919: Sam Houston Normal

Head coaching record
- Overall: 14–15–1 (football); 14–0 (basketball)

Eugene Riley Berry (December 7, 1891 – November 28, 1968) was an American football player and collegiate athletics coach. He is credited with founding the athletic department at Sam Houston State University–then known as Sam Houston Normal Institute–in 1914. He served as the school's head football coach (1914–1917, 1919) and head men's basketball coach (1917–1919).

Berry was born in Cooke County, Texas in 1891 and attended Denton High School.

Berry played college football at the University of Texas at Austin, earning letters in 1912 and 1913 and a law degree in 1914. He was also captain of the track team in 1914.

After ending his coaching career, Berry went into law in Huntsville starting in 1920, serving as county attorney of Walker County during until 1924. He was a senior partner in the firm of Berry & Smither starting in 1937. During World War II he served as chairman of the Walker County Rationing Board and as a faculty member of Sam Houston State College and attended the officer training program given at Ft. Sheridan, IL.

== Head coaching record ==
=== Football ===
Year	Team	Overall	Conference	Standing	Bowl/playoffs
Sam Houston Normal (Independent) (1914–1919)
1914	Sam Houston Normal	3–2			
1915	Sam Houston Normal	5–1–1			
1916	Sam Houston Normal	5–2			
1917	Sam Houston Normal	1–3			
1918	No team—World War I				
1919	Sam Houston Normal	0–7			
Sam Houston Normal:		14–15–1			
Total:		14–15–1			
