= 1917 William & Mary Indians football team =

American college football season

1917 William & Mary Indians football
- Conference: Eastern Virginia Intercollegiate Athletic Association, South Atlantic Intercollegiate Athletic Association
- Record: 3–5 (2–4 EVIAA, 0–3 SAIAA)
- Head coach: Harry Young (1st season)
- Captain: W. K. Close

1917 Eastern Virginia Intercollegiate Athletic Association football standings
	Conf.					Overall
Team	W		L		T	W		L		T
Hampden–Sydney $	5	–	0	–	1	5	–	2	–	2
Richmond	4	–	1	–	1	4	–	2	–	1
William & Mary	2	–	4	–	0	3	–	5	–	0
Randolph–Macon	0	–	6	–	0	0	–	0	–	7
$ – Conference champion

1917 South Atlantic Intercollegiate Athletic Association football standings
	Conf.					Overall
Team	W		L		T	W		L		T
Georgetown $	2	–	0	–	0	8	–	1	–	0
Richmond	2	–	1	–	0	4	–	2	–	1
Washington and Lee	2	–	1	–	0	4	–	3	–	0
North Carolina A&M	2	–	1	–	1	6	–	2	–	1
VPI	2	–	1	–	1	6	–	2	–	1
Maryland State	2	–	1	–	1	4	–	3	–	1
Davidson	1	–	2	–	0	6	–	4	–	0
VMI	1	–	3	–	1	4	–	4	–	1
St. John's (MD)	0	–	1	–	0	0	–	1	–	0
Johns Hopkins	0	–	1	–	0	0	–	3	–	0
William & Mary	0	–	3	–	0	3	–	5	–	0
$ – Conference champion

The 1917 William & Mary Indians football team represented the College of William & Mary as a member of the Eastern Virginia Intercollegiate Athletic Association (EVIAA) and the South Atlantic Intercollegiate Athletic Association (SAIAA) during the 1917 college football season. Led by Harry Young in his first and only year as head coach, William & Mary finished the season 3–5 overall, 2–4 in EVIAA play, and 0–3 against SAIAA opponents.

== Schedule ==
Date	Opponent	Site	Result	Source
October 6	at VMI	Lexington, VA (rivalry)	L 0–53	
October 13	at Richmond	Richmond, VA (rivalry)	L 0–28	
October 20	Randolph–Macon	Williamsburg, VA	W 13–0	
October 27	at Hampden–Sydney	Hampden Sydney, VA	L 0–21	
November 3	at Emory and Henry*	Emory-Meadowview, VA	W 7–0	
November 10	at Randolph–Macon	Ashland, VA	W 21–6	
November 17	Richmond	Williamsburg, VA	L 0–19	
November 24	vs. Hampden–Sydney	Newport News, VA	L 0–32	
*Non-conference game
