= 1917 Presbyterian Blue Hose football team =

American college football season

1917 Presbyterian Blue Hose football
- Conference: Independent
- Record: 8–1
- Head coach: Walter A. Johnson (3rd season)
- Captain: D. M. Fulton

1917 Southern college football independents records
	Conf.			Overall
Team	W	L	T	W		L		T
Middle Tennessee State Normal		–		7	–	0	–	0
Presbyterian		–		8	–	1	–	0
Navy		–		7	–	1	–	0
North Texas State Normal		–		6	–	1	–	0
Spring Hill		–		4	–	2	–	0
West Virginia		–		6	–	3	–	1
Southwest Texas State		–		5	–	3	–	0
West Tennessee State Normal		–		3	–	2	–	0
Texas Mines		–		0	–	0	–	1
Kentucky		–		3	–	5	–	1
Oglethorpe		–		1	–	2	–	0
Sam Houston Normal		–		1	–	3	–	0
Wake Forest		–		1	–	6	–	1
Marshall		–		1	–	7	–	1
Tennessee (SATC)		–		0	–	3	–	0

The 1917 Presbyterian Blue Hose football team represented Presbyterian College as an independent during the 1917 college football season. Led by the third-year head coach Walter A. Johnson, Presbyterian compiled a record of 8–1. The team captain was D. M. Fulton.

== Schedule ==
Date	Time	Opponent	Site	Result	Source
September 28		at Clemson	Riggs Field; Calhoun, SC	L 0–13	
October 5		Bailey Military Institute	Clinton, SC	W 55–0	
October 13		at The Citadel	College Park Stadium; Charleston, SC	W 7–0	
October 20		at Wofford	Spartanburg, SC	W 7–6	
October 26		at Guilford	Greensboro, NC	W 7–0	
November 9		Erskine	Clinton, SC	W 19–0	
November 17	3:30 p.m.	at Furman	Greenville, SC	W 14–7	
November 24		at South Carolina	Davis Field; Columbia, SC	W 20–14	
November 29		Newberry	Clinton, SC	W 20–0	
