= 1917 Middle Tennessee State Normal football team =

American college football season

1917 Middle Tennessee State Normal football
- Conference: Independent
- Record: 7–0
- Head coach: Johnny Floyd (1st season)
- Captain: Preston Vaughn Overall

1917 Southern college football independents records
| | Conf. | | | Overall |
| Team | W | L | T | W | | L | | T |
|---|---|---|---|---|---|---|---|---|
| Middle Tennessee State Normal | | – | | 7 | – | 0 | – | 0 |
| Presbyterian | | – | | 8 | – | 1 | – | 0 |
| Navy | | – | | 7 | – | 1 | – | 0 |
| North Texas State Normal | | – | | 6 | – | 1 | – | 0 |
| Spring Hill | | – | | 4 | – | 2 | – | 0 |
| West Virginia | | – | | 6 | – | 3 | – | 1 |
| Southwest Texas State | | – | | 5 | – | 3 | – | 0 |
| West Tennessee State Normal | | – | | 3 | – | 2 | – | 0 |
| Texas Mines | | – | | 0 | – | 0 | – | 1 |
| Kentucky | | – | | 3 | – | 5 | – | 1 |
| Oglethorpe | | – | | 1 | – | 2 | – | 0 |
| Sam Houston Normal | | – | | 1 | – | 3 | – | 0 |
| Wake Forest | | – | | 1 | – | 6 | – | 1 |
| Marshall | | – | | 1 | – | 7 | – | 1 |
| Tennessee (SATC) | | – | | 0 | – | 3 | – | 0 |

The 1917 Middle Tennessee State Normal football team represented the Middle Tennessee State Normal School—now known as Middle Tennessee State University—as an independent during the 1917 college football season. Led by first-year head coach Johnny Floyd, the team compiled a record of 7–0. Preston Vaughn Overall was the team captain.

== Schedule ==
| Date | Opponent | Site | Result | Source |
|---|---|---|---|---|
| October 6 | Sewanee Military Academy | Murfreesboro, TN | W 32–0 | |
| | Sewanee B team | Murfreesboro, TN | W 38–0 | |
| October 13 | at Vanderbilt B team | Dudley Field; Nashville, TN | W 14–0 | |
| October 26 | at Tennessee Polytechnic | Cookeville, TN | W 26–0 | |
| November 3 | at Castle Heights Military Academy | Lebanon, TN | W 31–0 | |
| November 17 | at Baylor Military Academy | Chattanooga, TN | W 32–0 | |
| | at Bedford County Stars | | W 28–0 | |
