= 1917 Georgetown Blue and Gray football team =

American college football season

1917 Georgetown Blue and Gray football

SAIAA champion
- Conference: South Atlantic Intercollegiate Athletic Association
- Record: 7–1 (2–0 SAIAA)
- Head coach: Albert Exendine (4th season)
- Captain: Jackie Maloney
- Home stadium: Georgetown Field

1917 South Atlantic Intercollegiate Athletic Association football standings
	Conf.					Overall
Team	W		L		T	W		L		T
Georgetown $	2	–	0	–	0	8	–	1	–	0
Richmond	2	–	1	–	0	4	–	2	–	1
Washington and Lee	2	–	1	–	0	4	–	3	–	0
North Carolina A&M	2	–	1	–	1	6	–	2	–	1
VPI	2	–	1	–	1	6	–	2	–	1
Maryland State	2	–	1	–	1	4	–	3	–	1
Davidson	1	–	2	–	0	6	–	4	–	0
VMI	1	–	3	–	1	4	–	4	–	1
St. John's (MD)	0	–	1	–	0	0	–	1	–	0
Johns Hopkins	0	–	1	–	0	0	–	3	–	0
William & Mary	0	–	3	–	0	3	–	5	–	0
$ – Conference champion

The 1917 Georgetown Blue and Gray football team represented Georgetown University during the 1917 college football season. Led by Albert Exendine in his fourth year as head coach, the team went 7–1 and won the South Atlantic Intercollegiate Athletic Association (SAIAA) championship.

== Schedule ==
Date	Time	Opponent	Site	Result	Source
October 6		Lebanon Valley*	Georgetown Field; Washington, DC	W 33–7	
October 12		at Springfield YMCA*	Pratt Field; Springfield, MA	W 26–0	
October 20		at Lehigh*	Taylor Stadium; Bethlehem, PA	W 17–6	
October 27		VPI	Georgetown Field; Washington, DC	W 28–0	
November 6	2:30 p.m.	at Fordham*	Fordham Field; Bronx, NY	W 12–0	
November 10		at Navy*	Worden Field; Annapolis, MD	L 7–28	
November 17		at Washington and Lee	Maher Field; Roanoke, VA	W 52–0	
November 29		Allentown Ambulance Corps*	American League Park; Washington, DC	W 27–0	
*Non-conference game
