= 1917 West Tennessee State Normal football team =

American college football season

1917 West Tennessee State Normal football
- Conference: Independent
- Record: 3–2
- Head coach: V. M. Campbell (1st season)
- Captain: Rollin Wilson
- Home stadium: Hodges Field

1917 Southern college football independents records
	Conf.			Overall
Team	W	L	T	W		L		T
Middle Tennessee State Normal		–		7	–	0	–	0
Presbyterian		–		8	–	1	–	0
Navy		–		7	–	1	–	0
North Texas State Normal		–		6	–	1	–	0
Spring Hill		–		4	–	2	–	0
West Virginia		–		6	–	3	–	1
Southwest Texas State		–		5	–	3	–	0
West Tennessee State Normal		–		3	–	2	–	0
Texas Mines		–		0	–	0	–	1
Kentucky		–		3	–	5	–	1
Oglethorpe		–		1	–	2	–	0
Sam Houston Normal		–		1	–	3	–	0
Wake Forest		–		1	–	6	–	1
Marshall		–		1	–	7	–	1
Tennessee (SATC)		–		0	–	3	–	0

The 1917 West Tennessee State Normal football team was an American football team that represented West Tennessee State Normal School (now known as the University of Memphis) as an independent during the 1917 college football season. In their first season under head coach V. M. Campbell, West Tennessee State Normal compiled a 3–2 record.

== Schedule ==
Date	Time	Opponent	Site	Result	Source
October 19		at Jonesboro Aggies	Kays Field; Jonesboro, AR (rivalry)	L 0–19	
October 27		Jackson High School	Memphis, TN	W 14–3	
November 5		at Union (TN)	Jackson, TN	W 14–6	
November 17	2:30 p.m.	Memphis University School	Hodges Field; Memphis, TN	W 20–6	
November 24		Central High School	Hodges Field; Memphis, TN	L 0–33	
