= 1917 Washington and Lee Generals football team =

American college football season

1917 Washington and Lee Generals football
- Conference: South Atlantic Intercollegiate Athletic Association
- Record: 4–3 (2–1 SAIAA)
- Head coach: W. C. Raftery (1st season)
- Home stadium: Wilson Field

1917 South Atlantic Intercollegiate Athletic Association football standings
	Conf.					Overall
Team	W		L		T	W		L		T
Georgetown $	2	–	0	–	0	8	–	1	–	0
Richmond	2	–	1	–	0	4	–	2	–	1
Washington and Lee	2	–	1	–	0	4	–	3	–	0
North Carolina A&M	2	–	1	–	1	6	–	2	–	1
VPI	2	–	1	–	1	6	–	2	–	1
Maryland State	2	–	1	–	1	4	–	3	–	1
Davidson	1	–	2	–	0	6	–	4	–	0
VMI	1	–	3	–	1	4	–	4	–	1
St. John's (MD)	0	–	1	–	0	0	–	1	–	0
Johns Hopkins	0	–	1	–	0	0	–	3	–	0
William & Mary	0	–	3	–	0	3	–	5	–	0
$ – Conference champion

The 1917 Washington and Lee Generals football team was an American football team that represented Washington and Lee University as a member of the South Atlantic Intercollegiate Athletic Association (SAIAA) during the 1917 college football season. In their first season under head coach W. C. Raftery, Washington and Lee compiled a 4–3 record.

== Schedule ==
Date	Opponent	Site	Result	Source
October 13	Randolph–Macon*	Wilson Field; Lexington, VA	W 66–0	
October 20	at Georgia Tech*	Grant Field; Atlanta, GA	L 0–63	
October 27	North Carolina A&M	Wilson Field; Lexington, VA	W 28–7	
November 3	Richmond	Wilson Field; Lexington, VA	W 43–0	
November 10	Roanoke*	Wilson Field; Lexington, VA	W 118–3	
November 17	vs. Georgetown	Maher Field; Roanoke, VA	L 12–20	
November 29	vs. Washington & Jefferson*	Boulevard Field; Richmond, VA	L 0–12	
*Non-conference game
