= 1917 Tennessee (SATC) football team =

American college football season

1917 Tennessee (SATC) football
- Conference: Independent
- Record: 0–3
- Home stadium: Waite Field

1917 Southern college football independents records
	Conf.			Overall
Team	W	L	T	W		L		T
Middle Tennessee State Normal		–		7	–	0	–	0
Presbyterian		–		8	–	1	–	0
Navy		–		7	–	1	–	0
North Texas State Normal		–		6	–	1	–	0
Spring Hill		–		4	–	2	–	0
West Virginia		–		6	–	3	–	1
Southwest Texas State		–		5	–	3	–	0
West Tennessee State Normal		–		3	–	2	–	0
Texas Mines		–		0	–	0	–	1
Kentucky		–		3	–	5	–	1
Oglethorpe		–		1	–	2	–	0
Sam Houston Normal		–		1	–	3	–	0
Wake Forest		–		1	–	6	–	1
Marshall		–		1	–	7	–	1
Tennessee (SATC)		–		0	–	3	–	0

The University of Tennessee Athletic Council, chaired by Professor Nathan Dougherty, officially suspended varsity football during the World War I years of 1917 and 1918 because the majority of the players were called into military service. In addition, Coach John R. Bender was enlisted as an instructor at Camp John Sevier in Greenville, South Carolina.

During this period without varsity football, two unofficial teams were formed from Army recruits and students. One team represented a training unit called the Fighting Mechanics and the other represented the Student Army Training Corps (SATC).

For historical purposes, Tennessee considers these games exhibitions and does not count them toward Tennessee's all-time varsity results.

== Schedule ==
Date	Opponent	Site	Result	Source
November 3	11th US Infantry Division	Waite Field; Knoxville, TN	L 6–20	
November 10	vs. Battery B Virginia Field Artillery	Chamberlain Field; Chattanooga, TN	L 0–35	
November 16	at Camp Gordon	Camp Field; Camp Gordon, GA	L 0–38	
