= 1917 Navy Midshipmen football team =

American college football season

1917 Navy Midshipmen football
- Conference: Independent
- Record: 7–1
- Head coach: Gil Dobie (1st season)
- Offensive scheme: Single-wing
- Base defense: 6–3–2
- Captain: Earnest von Heimburg
- Home stadium: Worden Field

1917 Southern college football independents records
	Conf.			Overall
Team	W	L	T	W		L		T
Middle Tennessee State Normal		–		7	–	0	–	0
Presbyterian		–		8	–	1	–	0
Navy		–		7	–	1	–	0
North Texas State Normal		–		6	–	1	–	0
Spring Hill		–		4	–	2	–	0
West Virginia		–		6	–	3	–	1
Southwest Texas State		–		5	–	3	–	0
West Tennessee State Normal		–		3	–	2	–	0
Texas Mines		–		0	–	0	–	1
Kentucky		–		3	–	5	–	1
Oglethorpe		–		1	–	2	–	0
Sam Houston Normal		–		1	–	3	–	0
Wake Forest		–		1	–	6	–	1
Marshall		–		1	–	7	–	1
Tennessee (SATC)		–		0	–	3	–	0

The 1917 Navy Midshipmen football team represented the United States Naval Academy during the 1917 college football season. In their first season under head coach Gil Dobie, the Midshipmen compiled a 7–1 record, shut out four opponents, and outscored all opponents by a combined score of 442 to 23.

The annual Army–Navy Game was not played this season or the next due to World War I.

== Schedule ==
Date	Opponent	Site	Result	Source
September 29	Davidson	Worden Field; Annapolis, MD	W 27-6	
October 6	West Virginia	Worden Field; Annapolis, MD	L 0–7	
October 13	Maryland State	Worden Field; Annapolis, MD (rivalry)	W 62–0	
October 20	Carlisle	Worden Field; Annapolis, MD	W 61–0	
October 27	Haverford	Worden Field; Annapolis, MD	W 89-0	
November 3	Western Reserve	Worden Field; Annapolis, MD	W 95–0	
November 10	Georgetown	Worden Field; Annapolis, MD	W 28–7	
November 17	Villanova	Worden Field; Annapolis, MD	W 80–3	
