= Dick Gurley =

American sports coach (1897–1976)

Biographical details
- Born: March 27, 1897
- Died: August 8, 1976 (aged 79)

Playing career

Football
- 1917–1920: NC State
- Position: Quarterback

Coaching career (HC unless noted)

Football
- 1924–1931: Lenoir–Rhyne

Basketball
- 1924–1932: Lenoir–Rhyne

Baseball
- 1925–1932: Lenoir–Rhyne

Head coaching record
- Overall: 33–39–4 (football); 67–71 (basketball); 68–59–1 (baseball)

Richard Nestus Gurley (March 27, 1897 – August 8, 1976) was an American football, basketball and baseball coach. He served as the head football coach at Lenoir–Rhyne University in Hickory, North Carolina from 1924 to 1931. He served as the school's head basketball and baseball coach.

As a college football player, he was a starting quarterback at North Carolina State University.
