= Harry Hartsell =

American college athlete and coach

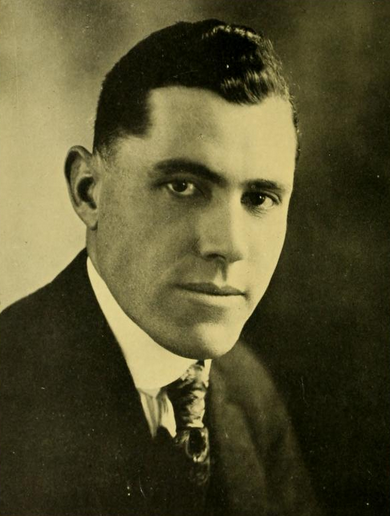
- Hartsell pictured in The Agromeck 1922, NC State yearbook

Biographical details
- Born: June 29, 1890; Asheville, North Carolina, U.S.
- Died: February 14, 1955 (aged 64); Charlottesville, Virginia, U.S.

Playing career

Football
- 1908–1911: North Carolina A&M

Basketball
- 1910–1912: North Carolina A&M

Baseball
- 1909–1912: North Carolina A&M
- Positions: End (football); Shortstop (baseball)

Coaching career (HC unless noted)

Football
- 1917: North Carolina A&M
- 1921–1923: NC State

Basketball
- 1916–1918: North Carolina A&M
- 1921–1923: NC State

Baseball
- 1917–1918: North Carolina A&M
- 1921–1923: NC State

Administrative career (AD unless noted)
- 1916–1918: North Carolina A&M

Head coaching record
- Overall: 16–18–4 (football); 34–32 (basketball); 52–37–4 (baseball)

Harry Hartsell (June 29, 1890 – February 14, 1955) was an American football, basketball, and baseball player, coach, and college athletics administrator. He served as the head football coach at North Carolina State University—renamed from North Carolina College of Agriculture and Mechanic Arts in 1918—for four seasons, in 1917 and again from 1921 to 1923, compiling a record of 16–18–4. He was also the head basketball coach at NC State for four seasons (1916–1918, 1921–1923), tallying a mark of 34–32, and the head baseball coach at the school for five seasons (1917–1918, 1921–1923), amassing a record of 52–37–4. Hartsell was born on June 29, 1890, in Asheville, North Carolina. He died at the age of 64 on February 14, 1955, at a hospital in Charlottesville, Virginia.

== Head coaching record ==
=== Football ===
Year	Team	Overall	Conference	Standing	Bowl/playoffs
North Carolina A&M Aggies (South Atlantic Intercollegiate Athletic Association) (1917)
1917	North Carolina A&M	6–2–1	2–1–1	T–4th	
NC State Aggies (South Atlantic Intercollegiate Athletic Association) (1921)
1921	NC State	3–3–3	1–1–3	11th	
NC State Wolfpack (Southern Conference) (1922–1923)
1922	NC State	4–6	0–5	20th	
1923	NC State	3–7	1–4	14th	
North Carolina A&M / NC State:		16–18–4	4–11–4		
Total:		16–18–4			

=== Baseball ===
Record table
Season	Team	Overall	Conference	Standing	Postseason
North Carolina A&M Farmers (Independent) (1917–1918)
1917	North Carolina A&M	5–8			
1918	North Carolina A&M	11–5–1			
NC State Wolfpack (Independent) (1921–1921)
1921	NC State	10–10–2			
NC State Wolfpack (Southern Conference) (1922–1923)
1922	NC State	13–7			
1923	NC State	13–7–1			
Total:		52–37–4			

== See also ==
- List of college football head coaches with non-consecutive tenure
