= H. M. Grey =

American sports coach (1896–1961)

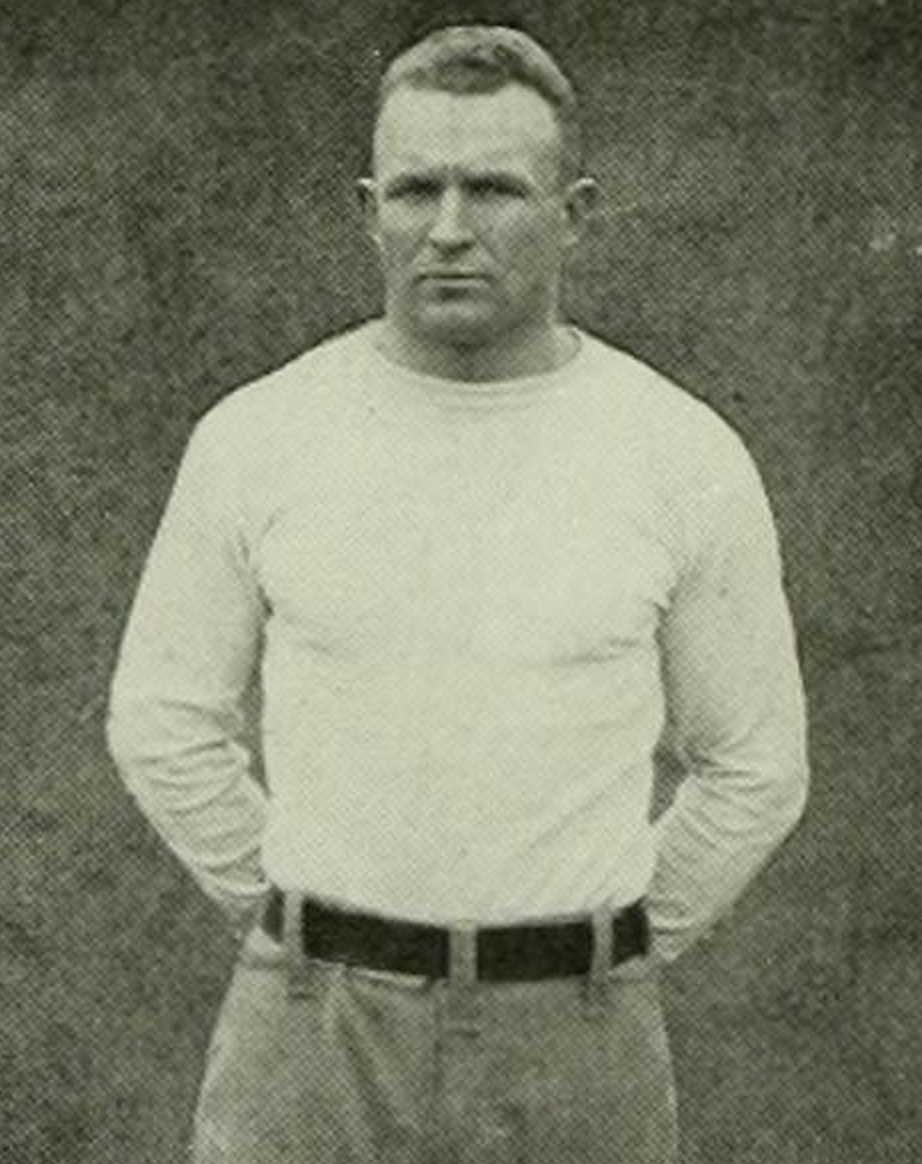
- Grey pictured in Quips and Cranks 1921, Davidson yearbook

Biographical details
- Born: July 4, 1896; Iredell County, North Carolina, U.S.
- Died: March 11, 1961 (aged 64); Venice, Florida, U.S.
- Education: University of Wisconsin

Playing career

Football
- 1917: Davidson
- Position: Guard

Coaching career (HC unless noted)

Football
- 1918–1919: Bailey Military Institute (SC)
- 1920–1922: Davidson

Basketball
- 1918–1919: Bailey Military Institute (SC)
- 1922–1923: Davidson

Administrative career (AD unless noted)
- 19??–1923: Davidson

Head coaching record
- Overall: 10–15–5 (football); 9–8 (basketball)

Hugh Morton "Wooly" Grey (July 4, 1896 – March 11, 1961) was an American college sports coach. He served as the head coach for Davidson College's football and men's basketball teams as well as the school's athletic director. Grey compiled overall records of 10–15–5 in football and 9–8 in basketball. Grey attended Davidson, in 1917 receiving All-Southern honors for his play on the football team from selectors John Heisman and Dick Jemison. He was also an alumnus of the University of Wisconsin. He also coached the Bailey Military Institute in South Carolina for the 1918-19 seasons.

Grey died while on vacation to visit a son in Venice, Florida in 1961.

== Head coaching record ==
=== Football ===
Year	Team	Overall	Conference	Standing	Bowl/playoffs
Davidson Wildcats (South Atlantic Intercollegiate Athletic Association) (1920–1921)
1920	Davidson	5–5	2–2	T–7th	
1921	Davidson	3–4–3	0–1–3	13th	
Davidson Wildcats (Independent) (1922)
1922	Davidson	2–6–2			
Davidson:		10–15–5	2–3–3		
Total:		10–15–5			

=== Basketball ===
Record table
Season	Team	Overall	Conference	Standing	Postseason
Davidson Wildcats (Independent) (1922–1923)
1922–23	Davidson	9–8			
Davidson:		9–8			
Total:		9–8			
